= Washington State Ferries fleet =

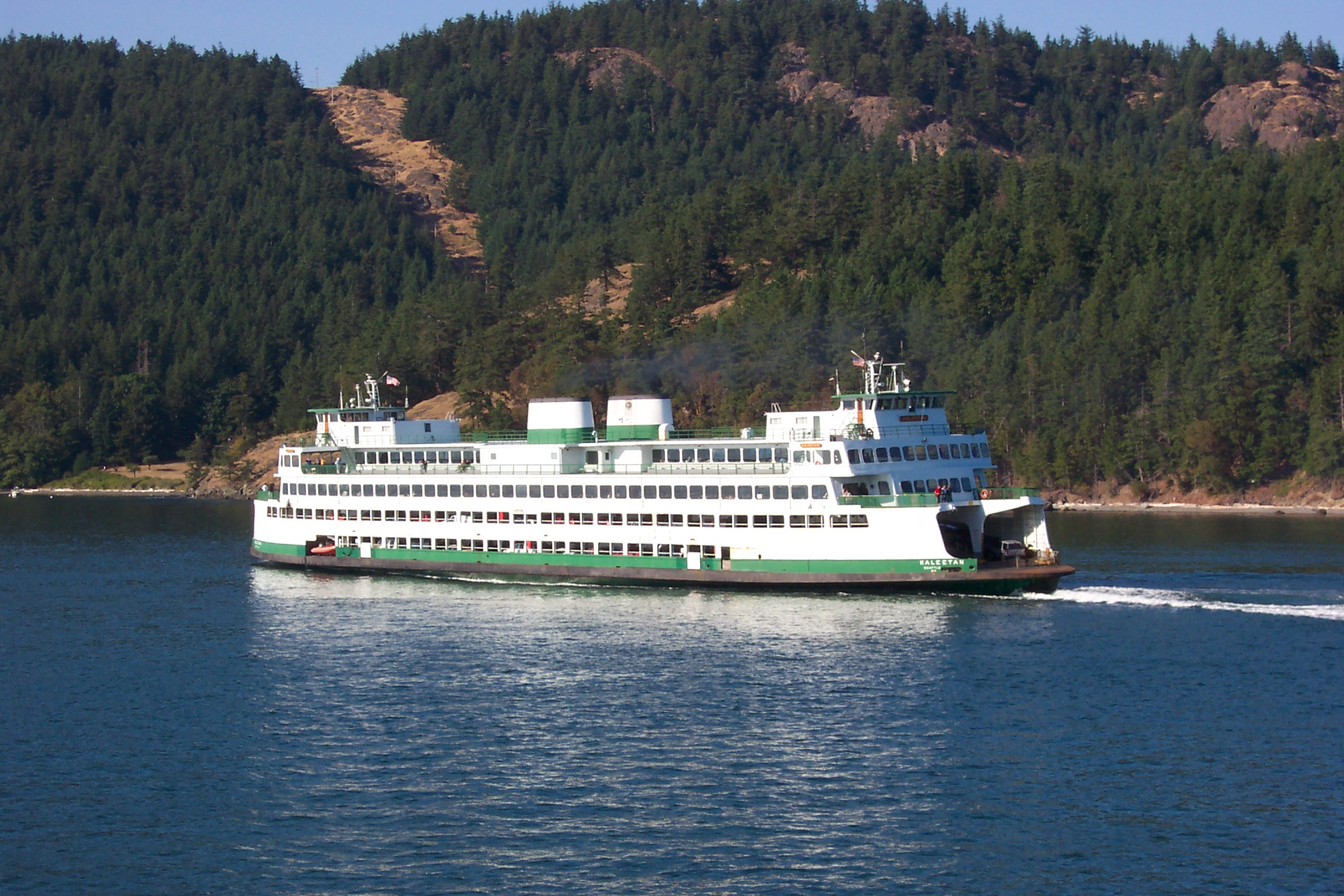
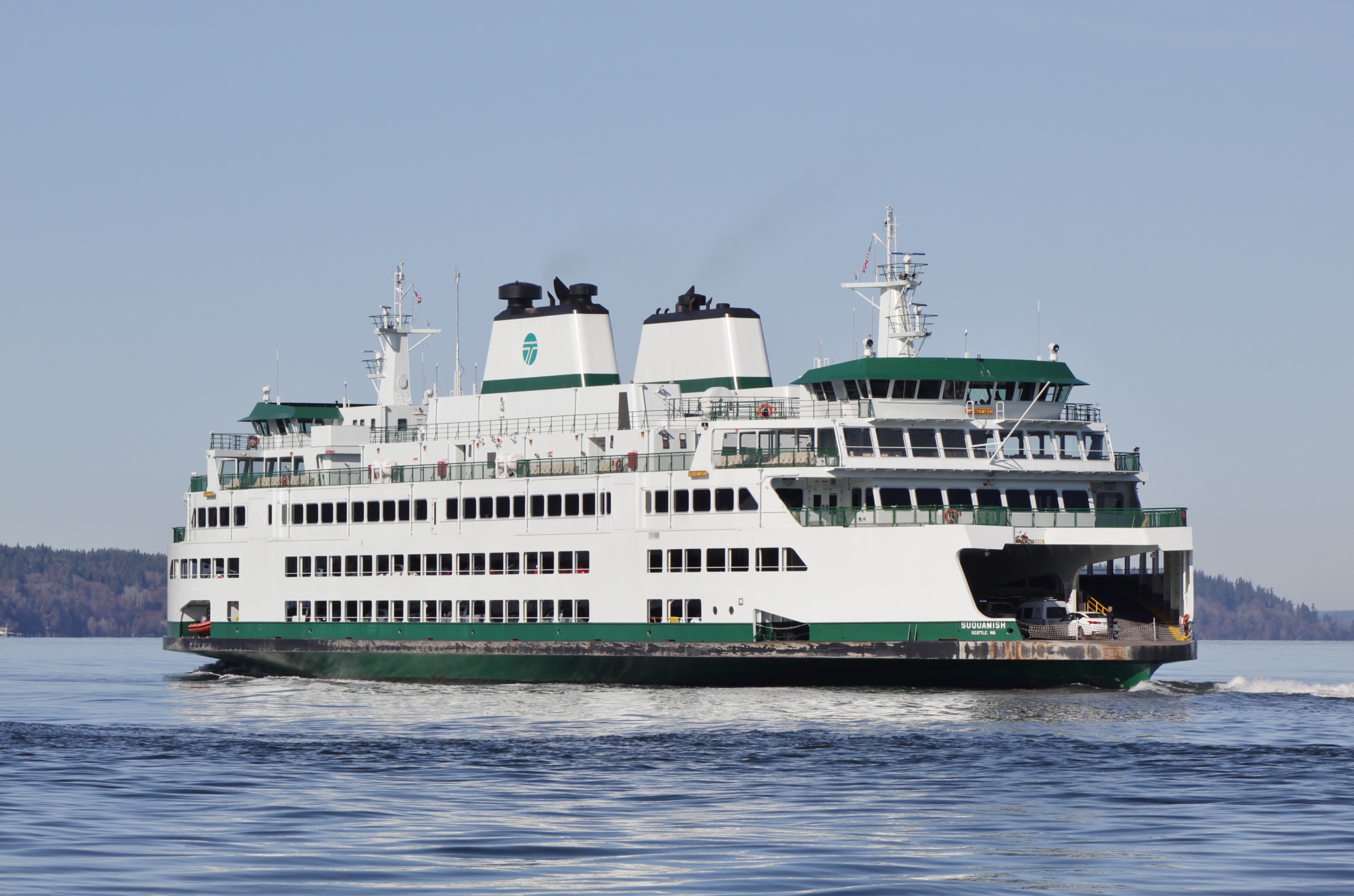
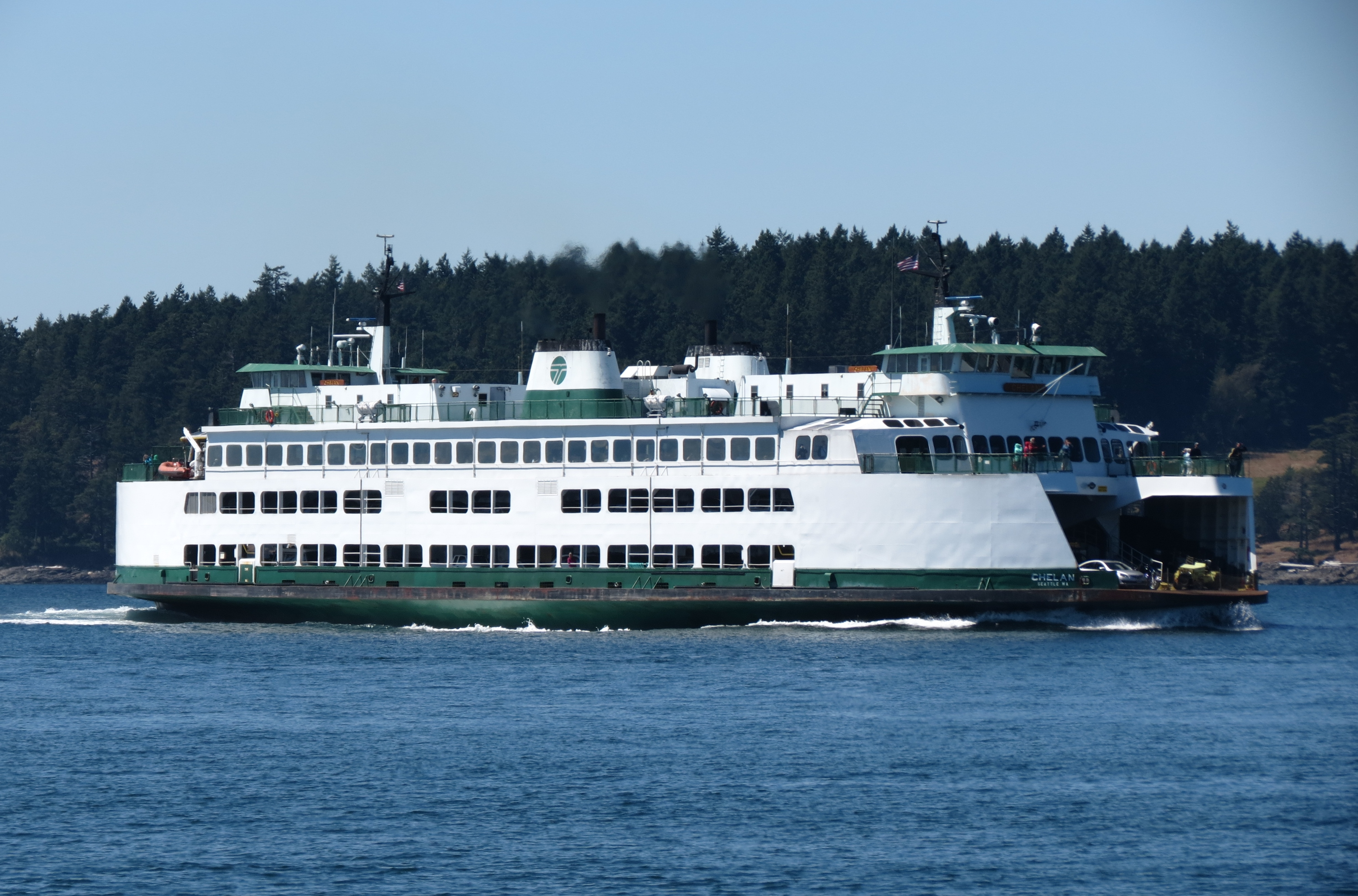
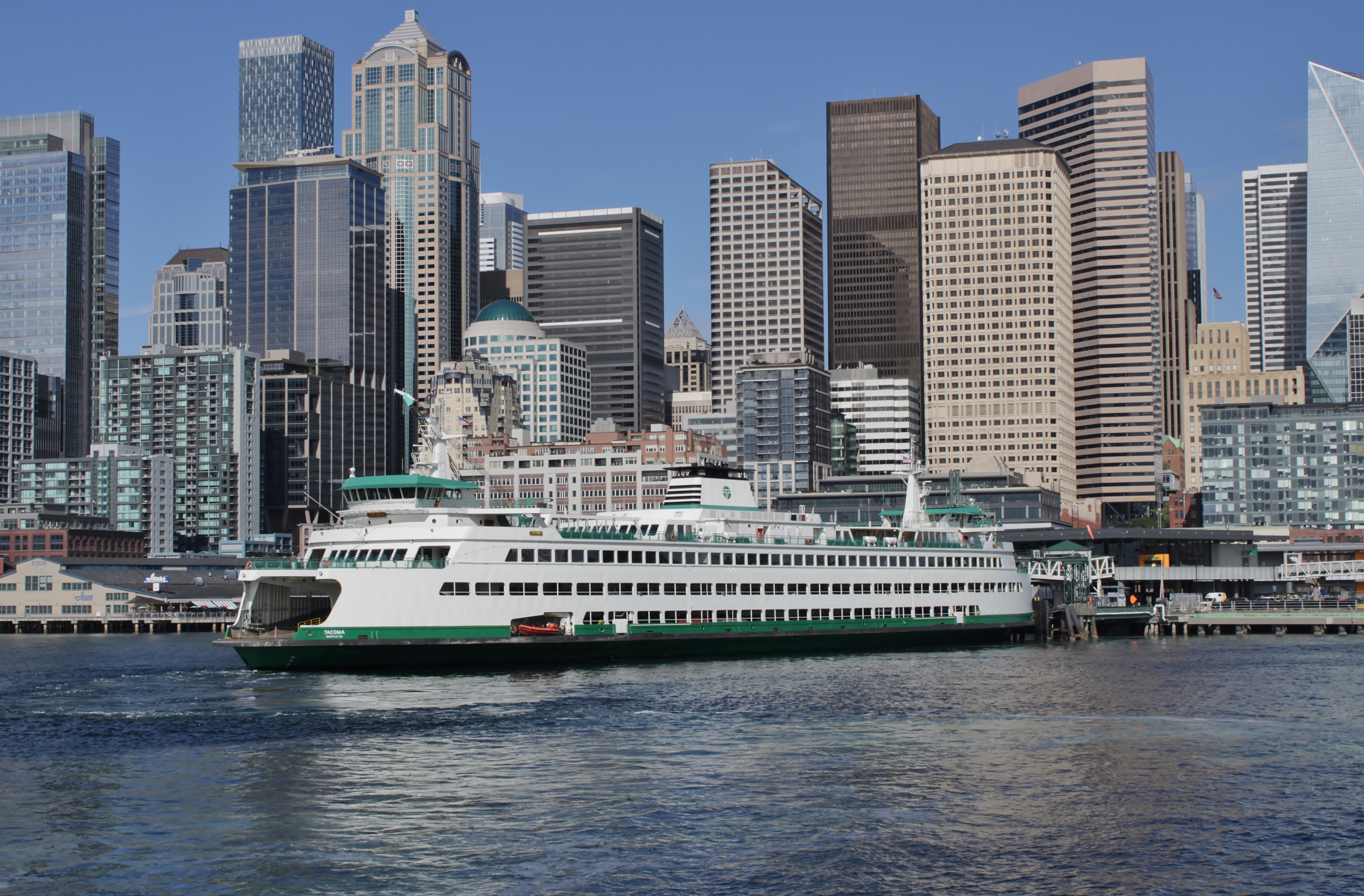
Active vessels in the Washington State Ferries system. Clockwise from top left: MV Kaleetan near Orcas Island, MV Suquamish in Mukilteo, MV Tacoma at Colman Dock in Seattle, and MV Chelan near Lopez Island.

Washington State Ferries (WSF) is a public ferry system operated by the state government of Washington in the United States. It has a fleet of 21 roll-on/roll-off ferry vessels that carry both passengers and vehicles on its 8 routes between its 20 terminals within Puget Sound and the San Juan Islands. WSF is the largest ferry system in the United States and the second largest vehicular ferry system in the world; in 2024, it carried over 19 million total riders, of which 9 million were in vehicles. The system's main terminal is Colman Dock in Seattle and its maintenance base is Eagle Harbor on Bainbridge Island.

The system uses double-ended ferries that have two pilothouses and two propellers for operation in either direction. They are powered by engines that use diesel fuel; the system uses 19 million gallons (72,000 m^{3}) of diesel annually. The vessels have separate decks for automobiles and passengers, including outdoor areas for the latter, that are connected by stairs and elevators. Vehicles are driven onto the ferry, while passengers can board the "picklefork" on the deck from overhead walkways at major terminals or from the vehicle deck at other facilities. The passenger cabin includes restrooms, a staffed galley with a dining area, and vending machines. Washington State Ferries uses a standard livery of white with green trim for its vessels, but also allows the use of wraps for advertising through contractors; a gold stripe is painted on the stack when a vessel enters its 50th year of service.

Washington State Ferries began operations on June 1, 1951, after the state government's acquisition of the private Puget Sound Navigation Company's domestic routes in Puget Sound. The company, nicknamed the "Black Ball Line" for its flag, had acquired smaller operators who had formed the "mosquito fleet" and had a fleet of vessels that varied widely in size, capacity, and condition. The state government retained 16 of the company's vessels, including a handful of older wood-decked and steam-powered boats, and acquired other vessels from Maryland and local county systems. Among the most famous was MV Kalakala, which was built in 1935 with a streamlined, Art Deco design atop an existing hull; she was the flagship of the Puget Sound Navigation Company and early ferry system until her retirement in 1967. The older ferries were gradually retired and replaced by larger vessels that were built specifically for the state's system, beginning with MV Evergreen State in 1954 and followed by the "superferries" in the 1960s that could carry up to 2,600 passengers and 160 vehicles. Washington State Ferries also acquired several passenger-only catamarans for limited service in the 1980s and 1990s, but retired the last of the fleet in 2009.

As of 2025, the system has 21 ferries—of which 18 are in regular service during the peak months and 3 are designated for reserve or emergency use. The state government plans to acquire up to six new vessels that would be diesel–electric hybrids; MV Wenatchee, an existing diesel ferry, was converted to a hybrid and re-entered service in 2025. The ferries are typically assigned to a single route, but are able to be transferred depending on need. The largest ferries in the fleet are the three Jumbo Mark II class vessels, built from 1997 to 1999, which carry 202 vehicles and 1,791 passengers. The smallest are the Kwa-di Tabil class, which were built in the early 2010s and carry 64 vehicles and 748 passengers. The passenger capacity of the vessels was revised in 2011 following a new directive from the U.S. Coast Guard to account for the rise in obesity among Americans; the Jumbo Mark II formerly had a listed capacity of 2,000 passengers. Each vessel requires between 10 and 16 crewmembers while in service, depending on the size of the class. The oldest active ferry in the system, MV Tillikum, was built in 1959 and is scheduled to be retired by 2035, when she will be 76 years old. One active vessel, MV Chelan, was equipped to meet SOLAS Convention certification for international service between Anacortes and Sidney, British Columbia, which was suspended in 2020.

The ferries are named by the Washington State Transportation Commission and are derived from the state's Native American tribes and their languages. The tradition originated with the Puget Sound Navigation Company in the 1930s and was adopted by the state government in 1958; the final vessel with a non-indigenous name was the Evergreen State, which was retired in 2015. Of the 21 active vessels in the Washington State Ferries system, 19 were built in Seattle; the Super-class had been built in San Diego, California. The state government added a requirement to use in-state shipbuilders for the ferry system in 1997; the ten bids awarded since then went to Todd Shipyards (later Vigor Shipyards) in Seattle. The requirement to use in-state shipbuilders was repealed in 2023 after negotiations with Vigor to build new vessels stalled; a Florida-based shipbuilder was selected in 2025 to build three hybrid diesel–electric ferries.

== Current vessels ==
As of 2025, Washington State Ferries has 21 vessels from 7 classes in its active fleet.

Active fleet of Washington State Ferries
Vessel	Class	Year built	Capacity		Length	Beam	Displacement	Horsepower	Maximum speed	Notes
Vessel	Class	Year built	Vehicles	Passengers	Length	Beam	Displacement	Horsepower	Maximum speed	Notes
MV Cathlamet	Issaquah	1981	124	1,196	328 ft 2 in (100.0 m)	78 ft 8 in (24.0 m)	3,310 LT	5,100 hp (3,800 kW)	16 kn (18 mph; 30 km/h)	Rebuilt in 1993
MV Chelan	Issaquah	1981	124	1,196 (Note: For international trips, capacity on MV Chelan is reduced to 1,090 passengers.)	328 ft 2 in (100.0 m)	78 ft 8 in (24.0 m)	3,405 LT	5,100 hp (3,800 kW)	16 kn (18 mph; 30 km/h)	Rebuilt in 2005 for SOLAS certification
MV Chetzemoka	Kwa-di Tabil	2010	64	748	273 ft 10 in (83.5 m)	66 ft 2 in (20.2 m)	2,090 LT	6,000 hp (4,500 kW)	14 kn (16 mph; 26 km/h)	
MV Chimacum	Olympic	2017	144	1,500	362 ft 5 in (110.5 m)	83 ft 6 in (25.5 m)	5,171 LT	6,000 hp (4,500 kW)	17 kn (20 mph; 31 km/h)	
MV Issaquah	Issaquah	1979	124	1,196	328 ft 2 in (100.0 m)	78 ft 8 in (24.0 m)	3,310 LT	5,100 hp (3,800 kW)	16 kn (18 mph; 30 km/h)	Rebuilt in 1989
MV Kaleetan	Super	1967	144	1,195	382 ft 2 in (116.5 m)	73 ft 2 in (22.3 m)	3,634 LT	8,960 hp (6,680 kW)	17 kn (20 mph; 31 km/h)	Rebuilt in 1999
MV Kennewick	Kwa-di Tabil	2011	64	748	273 ft 10 in (83.5 m)	66 ft 2 in (20.2 m)	2,090 LT	6,000 hp (4,500 kW)	14 kn (16 mph; 26 km/h)	
MV Kitsap	Issaquah	1980	124	1,196	328 ft 2 in (100.0 m)	78 ft 8 in (24.0 m)	3,310 LT	5,100 hp (3,800 kW)	16 kn (18 mph; 30 km/h)	Rebuilt in 1992
MV Kittitas	Issaquah	1980	124	1,196	328 ft 2 in (100.0 m)	78 ft 8 in (24.0 m)	3,310 LT	5,100 hp (3,800 kW)	16 kn (18 mph; 30 km/h)	Rebuilt in 1990
MV Puyallup	Jumbo Mark II	1999	202	1,791	460 ft 2 in (140.3 m)	90 ft 0 in (27.4 m)	6,184 LT	16,000 hp (12,000 kW)	18 kn (21 mph; 33 km/h)	
MV Salish	Kwa-di Tabil	2011	64	748	273 ft 10 in (83.5 m)	66 ft 2 in (20.2 m)	2,090 LT	6,000 hp (4,500 kW)	14 kn (16 mph; 26 km/h)	
MV Samish	Olympic	2015	144	1,500	362 ft 5 in (110.5 m)	83 ft 6 in (25.5 m)	5,171 LT	6,000 hp (4,500 kW)	17 kn (20 mph; 31 km/h)	
MV Sealth	Issaquah	1982	90	1,196	328 ft 2 in (100.0 m)	78 ft 8 in (24.0 m)	3,310 LT	5,100 hp (3,800 kW)	16 kn (18 mph; 30 km/h)	
MV Spokane	Jumbo	1972	188	1,793	440 ft 0 in (134.1 m)	87 ft 0 in (26.5 m)	4,859 LT	11,500 hp (8,600 kW)	18 kn (21 mph; 33 km/h)	Rebuilt in 2004
MV Suquamish	Olympic	2018	144	1,500	362 ft 5 in (110.5 m)	83 ft 6 in (25.5 m)	5,171 LT	6,000 hp (4,500 kW)	17 kn (20 mph; 31 km/h)	
MV Tacoma	Jumbo Mark II	1997	202	1,791	460 ft 2 in (140.3 m)	90 ft 0 in (27.4 m)	6,184 LT	16,000 hp (12,000 kW)	18 kn (21 mph; 33 km/h)	
MV Tillikum	Evergreen State	1959	87	596	310 ft 2 in (94.5 m)	73 ft 2 in (22.3 m)	2,413 LT	4,600 hp (3,400 kW)	13 kn (15 mph; 24 km/h)	Rebuilt in 1994
MV Tokitae	Olympic	2014	144	1,500	362 ft 5 in (110.5 m)	83 ft 6 in (25.5 m)	5,171 LT	6,000 hp (4,500 kW)	17 kn (20 mph; 31 km/h)	
MV Walla Walla	Jumbo	1973	188	1,793	440 ft 0 in (134.1 m)	87 ft 0 in (26.5 m)	4,859 LT	11,500 hp (8,600 kW)	18 kn (21 mph; 33 km/h)	Rebuilt in 2005
MV Wenatchee	Jumbo Mark II	1999	202	1,791	460 ft 2 in (140.3 m)	90 ft 0 in (27.4 m)	6,184 LT	8,000 hp (6,000 kW)	18 kn (21 mph; 33 km/h)	Converted to diesel–electric propulsion in 2025
MV Yakima	Super	1967	144	1,195	382 ft 2 in (116.5 m)	73 ft 2 in (22.3 m)	3,634 LT	8,960 hp (6,680 kW)	17 kn (20 mph; 31 km/h)	Rebuilt in 2000

== Future vessels ==
Future Washington State Ferries vessels
Vessel	Class	Year planned	Capacity		Length	Beam	Notes	Ref.
Vessel	Class	Year planned	Vehicles	Passengers	Length	Beam	Notes	Ref.
MV Wishkah	TBA	2030	164	1,500	405 ft 0 in (123.4 m)	83 ft 2 in (25.3 m)	Hybrid diesel–electric engine	
Unnamed vessel	TBA	NET 2031	164	1,500	405 ft 0 in (123.4 m)	83 ft 2 in (25.3 m)	Hybrid diesel–electric engine	
Unnamed vessel	TBA	NET 2032	164	1,500	405 ft 0 in (123.4 m)	83 ft 2 in (25.3 m)	Hybrid diesel–electric engine	

== Retired vessels ==
Former fleet of Washington State Ferries
Vessel	Class	Years in service (Note: Refers to years in service with Washington State Ferries)		Capacity (Note: Reflects the latest known capacity)		Length	Beam	Horsepower	Maximum speed	Notes	Ref.
Vessel	Class	Entered	Retired	Vehicles	Passengers	Length	Beam	Horsepower	Maximum speed	Notes	Ref.
MV Chetzemoka (1927)	Wood Electric	1951	1973	50	400	239 ft 11 in (73.1 m)	60 ft 3 in (18.4 m)	1,200 hp (890 kW)	10 kn (12 mph; 19 km/h)	Built in 1927 and purchased by PSN in 1937	
MV Chinook	Passenger-Only Fast Ferry	1998	2008	0	350	143 ft 3 in (43.7 m)	39 ft 4 in (12.0 m)	7,200 hp (5,400 kW)	38 kn (44 mph; 70 km/h)	Sold to Golden Gate Ferry	
MV Chippewa	None	1951	1964	52	950	212 ft 3 in (64.7 m)	52 ft 7 in (16.0 m)	2,130 hp (1,590 kW)	15 kn (17 mph; 28 km/h)	Built in 1900; rebuilt in 1926 and 1932 under PSN	
MV Crosline	None	1951	1967	30	300	150 ft 7 in (45.9 m)	55 ft 1 in (16.8 m)	1,200 hp (890 kW)	10 kn (12 mph; 19 km/h)	Built in 1925; rebuilt in 1947 by State Highway Department	
MV Elwha	Super	1967	2020	144	2,000	382 ft 2 in (116.5 m)	73 ft 2 in (22.3 m)	8,000 hp (6,000 kW)	20 kn (23 mph; 37 km/h)	SOLAS certified; international capacity was 1,090 passengers; rebuilt in 1991	
MV Enetai	Steel Electric	1951	1968	70	1,500	256 ft 0 in (78.0 m)	66 ft 0 in (20.1 m)	2,800 hp (2,100 kW)	15 kn (17 mph; 28 km/h)	Built in 1927 and purchased by PSN in 1940; rebuilt in 1941	
MV Evergreen State	Evergreen State	1954	2016	87	854	310 ft 0 in (94.5 m)	73 ft 0 in (22.3 m)	2,500 hp (1,900 kW)	13 kn (15 mph; 24 km/h)	Rebuilt in 1988	
MV Hiyu	None	1967	2016	34	199	63 ft 1 in (19.2 m)	11 ft 3 in (3.4 m)	860 hp (640 kW)	10 kn (12 mph; 19 km/h)		
MV Hyak	Super	1967	2019	144	2,000	382 ft 2 in (116.5 m)	73 ft 2 in (22.3 m)	8,000 hp (6,000 kW)	17 kn (20 mph; 31 km/h)		
MV Illahee	Steel Electric	1951	2007	59	616	256 ft 2 in (78.1 m)	73 ft 10 in (22.5 m)	2,896 hp (2,160 kW)	12 kn (14 mph; 22 km/h)	Built in 1927 and purchased by PSN in 1940; rebuilt in 1958 and 1986	
MV Kalakala	None	1951	1967	70	1,943	276 ft 5 in (84.3 m)	55 ft 7 in (16.9 m)	3,000 hp (2,200 kW)	15 kn (17 mph; 28 km/h)	Built in 1927; rebuilt by PSN in 1933–35 with new superstructure	
MV Kalama	Skagit Kalama	1989	2009	0	250	112 ft 0 in (34.1 m)	25 ft 0 in (7.6 m)	2,840 hp (2,120 kW)	25 kn (29 mph; 46 km/h)	Loaned to Caltrans after the 1989 Loma Prieta earthquake; sold to the government of Tanzania	
MV Kehloken	Wood Electric	1951	1973	50	770	239 ft 8 in (73.1 m)	60 ft 3 in (18.4 m)	1,200 hp (890 kW)	10 kn (12 mph; 19 km/h)	Built in 1926 and purchased by PSN in 1937	
MV Kitsap (1925)	None	1951	1962	32	325	165 ft 7 in (50.5 m)	50 ft 5 in (15.4 m)	600 hp (450 kW)	9 kn (10 mph; 17 km/h)	Built in 1925 and acquired by PSN in 1935; sold to government of Oregon	
MV Klahanie	Wood Electric	1951	1973	50	601	240 ft 6 in (73.3 m)	59 ft 6 in (18.1 m)	1,200 hp (890 kW)	10 kn (12 mph; 19 km/h)	Built in 1928 and purchased by PSN in 1937	
MV Klahowya	Evergreen State	1958	2017	87	792	310 ft 2 in (94.5 m)	73 ft 2 in (22.3 m)	2,500 hp (1,900 kW)	13 kn (15 mph; 24 km/h)	Rebuilt in 1995	
MV Klickitat	Steel Electric	1951	2007	64	617	256 ft 0 in (78.0 m)	73 ft 10 in (22.5 m)	2,400 hp (1,800 kW)	12 kn (14 mph; 22 km/h)	Built in 1927 and purchased by PSN in 1940; rebuilt in 1958 and 1981	
MV Kulshan	None	1969	1982	65	350	242 ft 2 in (73.8 m)	65 ft 2 in (19.9 m)	1,200 hp (890 kW)	13 kn (15 mph; 24 km/h)	Built in 1954 and purchased from San Diego and Coronado Ferry Company; sold to the U.S. Coast Guard	
MV Leschi	None	1951	1968	40	453	169 ft 11 in (51.8 m)	50 ft 3 in (15.3 m)	560 hp (420 kW)	10 kn (12 mph; 19 km/h)	Built in 1913; rebuilt in 1931 and acquired from King County Ferry District	
MV Nisqually	Steel Electric	1951	2007	59	616	256 ft 0 in (78.0 m)	73 ft 10 in (22.5 m)	2,896 hp (2,160 kW)	12 kn (14 mph; 22 km/h)	Built in 1927 and purchased by PSN in 1940; rebuilt in 1958 and 1987	
MV Olympic	None	1954	1993	55	605	207 ft 6 in (63.2 m)	62 ft 0 in (18.9 m)	1,400 hp (1,000 kW)	11 kn (13 mph; 20 km/h)	Built in 1938 and purchased by WSF	
MV Quinault	Steel Electric	1951	2007	59	616	256 ft 0 in (78.0 m)	73 ft 10 in (22.5 m)	2,896 hp (2,160 kW)	12 kn (14 mph; 22 km/h)	Built in 1927 and purchased by PSN in 1940; rebuilt in 1958 and 1985	
MV Rhododendron	None	1953	2012	48	546	227 ft 6 in (69.3 m)	62 ft 0 in (18.9 m)	2,172 hp (1,620 kW)	11 kn (13 mph; 20 km/h)	Built in 1947 and purchased from Claiborne–Annapolis Ferry Company; rebuilt in 1990	
MV Rosario	None	1951	1951	33	312	155 ft 8 in (47.4 m)	40 ft 8 in (12.4 m)	560 hp (420 kW)	10 kn (12 mph; 19 km/h)	Built in 1923; rebuilt in 1931	
SS San Mateo	None	1951	1970	50	659	230 ft 4 in (70.2 m)	63 ft 8 in (19.4 m)	1,400 hp (1,000 kW)	10.5 kn (12.1 mph; 19.4 km/h)	Steamship built in 1922 and purchased by PSN in 1941	
SS Shasta	None	1951	1959	55	468	216 ft 7 in (66.0 m)	63 ft 8 in (19.4 m)	1,200 hp (890 kW)	13 kn (15 mph; 24 km/h)	Steamship built in 1922 and purchased by PSN in 1941	
MV Skagit	Skagit Kalama	1989	2009	0	250	112 ft 0 in (34.1 m)	25 ft 0 in (7.6 m)	2,840 hp (2,120 kW)	25 kn (29 mph; 46 km/h)	Loaned to Caltrans after the 1989 Loma Prieta earthquake; sold to the government of Tanzania	
MV Skansonia	None	1951	1969	32	308	164 ft 6 in (50.1 m)	50 ft 11 in (15.5 m)	640 hp (480 kW)	8 kn (9.2 mph; 15 km/h)	Built in 1929 for the State Highway Department	
MV Snohomish	Passenger-Only Fast Ferry	1999	2008	0	350	143 ft 3 in (43.7 m)	39 ft 4 in (12.0 m)	7,200 hp (5,400 kW)	38 kn (44 mph; 70 km/h)	Sold to Golden Gate Ferry	
MV Tyee	None	1985	2003	0	270	94 ft 4 in (28.8 m)	31 ft 0 in (9.4 m)	2,990 hp (2,230 kW)	25 kn (29 mph; 46 km/h)	Rebuilt in 1993	
MV Vashon	None	1951	1980	50	646	200 ft 0 in (61.0 m)	58 ft 0 in (17.7 m)	925 hp (690 kW)	10.5 kn (12.1 mph; 19.4 km/h)	Built in 1930 and acquired by PSN in 1935	
MV Willapa	Steel Electric	1951	1968	70	1,530	256 ft 0 in (78.0 m)	66 ft 0 in (20.1 m)	2,800 hp (2,100 kW)	15 kn (17 mph; 28 km/h)	Built in 1927 and purchased by PSN in 1940; rebuilt in 1941	

== See also ==
- MV Sanpoil, operated by the Washington State Department of Transportation on the Columbia River
