= Union Iron Works =

American shipyard company in San Francisco

- Union Iron Works Historic District
- U.S. National Register of Historic Places
- U.S. Historic district
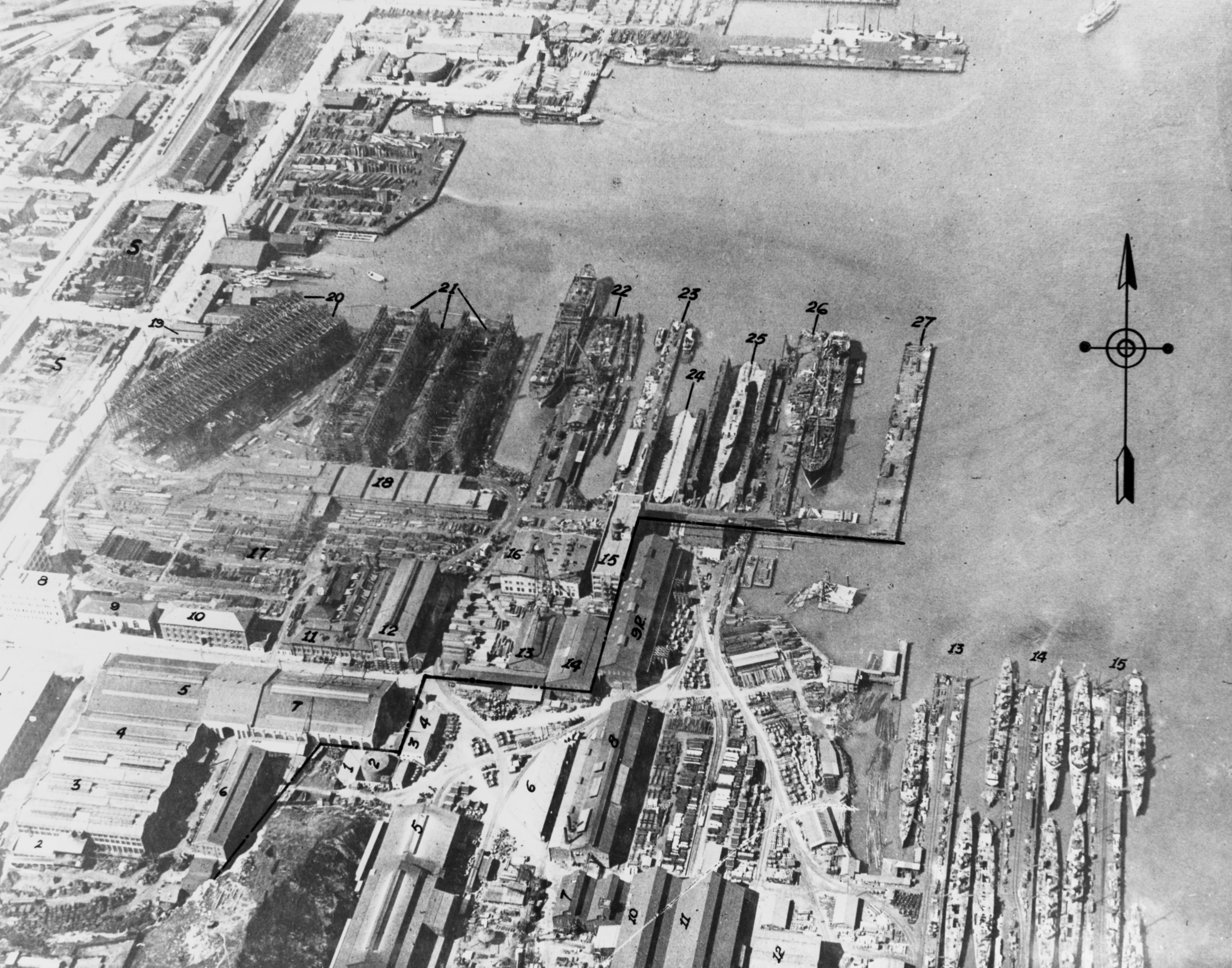
- Union Iron Works at Pier 70, 1918

- Location within San Francisco Bay Area Location within California Location within the United States
- Location: E. of Illinois between 18th & 22nd Sts., San Francisco, California
- Coordinates: 37°45′38.68″N 122°23′4.01″W
- Area: 66 acres (27 ha)
- NRHP reference No.: 14000150
- Added to NRHP: April 17, 2014

Union Iron Works, located in San Francisco, California, on the southeast waterfront, was a central business within the large industrial zone of Potrero Point, for four decades at the end of the nineteenth and beginning of the twentieth centuries.

== History ==
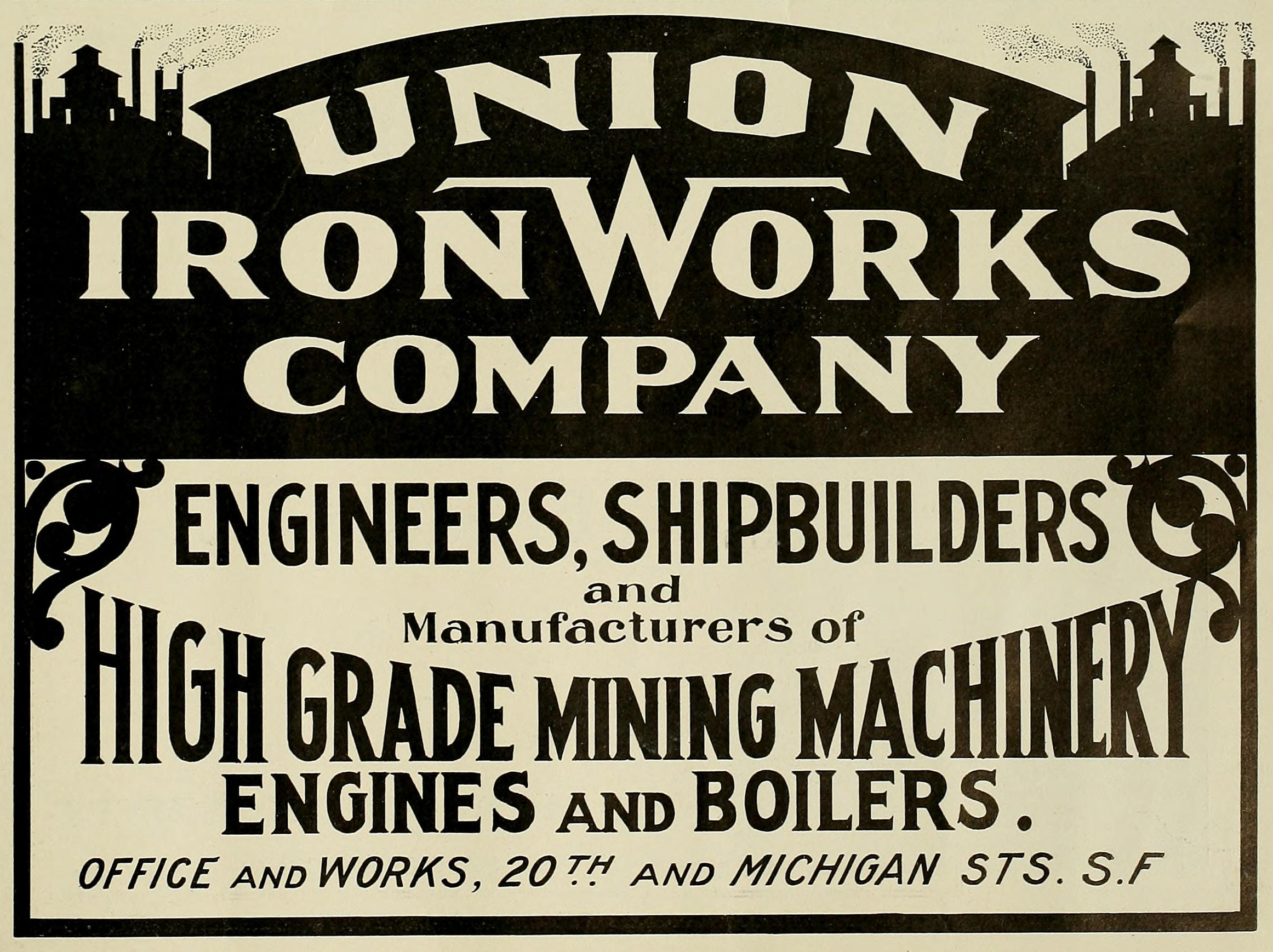
Company logo, 1906

Peter Donohue, an Irish immigrant, founded Union Brass & Iron Works in the south of Market area of San Francisco in 1849. It was later run by his son, James Donohue. After years as the premiere producer of mining, railroad, agricultural and locomotive machinery in California, Union Iron Works, led by I. M. Scott, entered the ship building business and relocated to Potrero Point where its shipyards still exist, making the site on the north side of the Potrero the longest running privately owned shipyard in the United States. After Bethlehem Shipbuilding Corporation bought the works in 1905, the consolidated company came to include the Alameda Works Shipyard, located across the San Francisco Bay in Alameda and the Hunter's Point shipyard to the south.

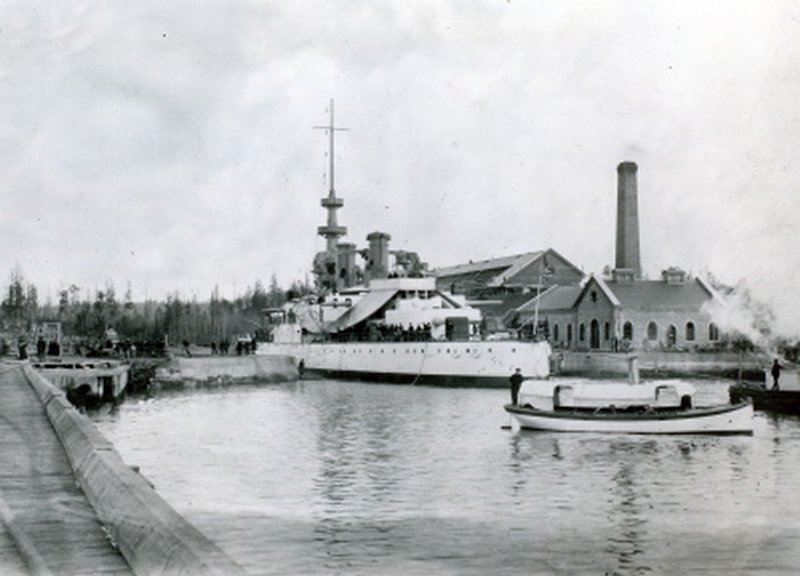
USS Oregon at a dry dock in Bremerton, Washington, 1896

In 1885, the Union Iron Works launched the first steel-hulled ship on the west coast, Arago, built with steel from the Pacific Rolling Mills. In 1886, UIW was awarded a $1,000,000 contract to build the cruiser USS Charleston for the United States Navy, which they completed in eighteen months. From the completion of Arago in 1884 to 1902, UIW built seventy-five marine vessels, including two of the most famous vessels of the Spanish–American War, USS Olympia and USS Oregon.

Employees of Union Iron Works during lunchtime, circa 1898

An 1892 description of the yards stated that between 1200 and 1500 men were employed and the yearly gross revenue was between $2,000,000 and $4,000,000. By the turn of the century, the shipyard had expanded in area and employment had more than doubled to 3,500. These industrial facilities used five types of power, distributed throughout; electricity, compressed air, steam, hydraulic and coal or gas fire. Union Iron works built a number of ships for the United States Navy. These ships include USS Oregon laid down in 1891, and Adder-class submarines Grampus and Pike which were launched in 1902 and 1903, respectively. The latter two were subcontracted from the Holland Torpedo Boat Company, and were the first submarines built on the West Coast.

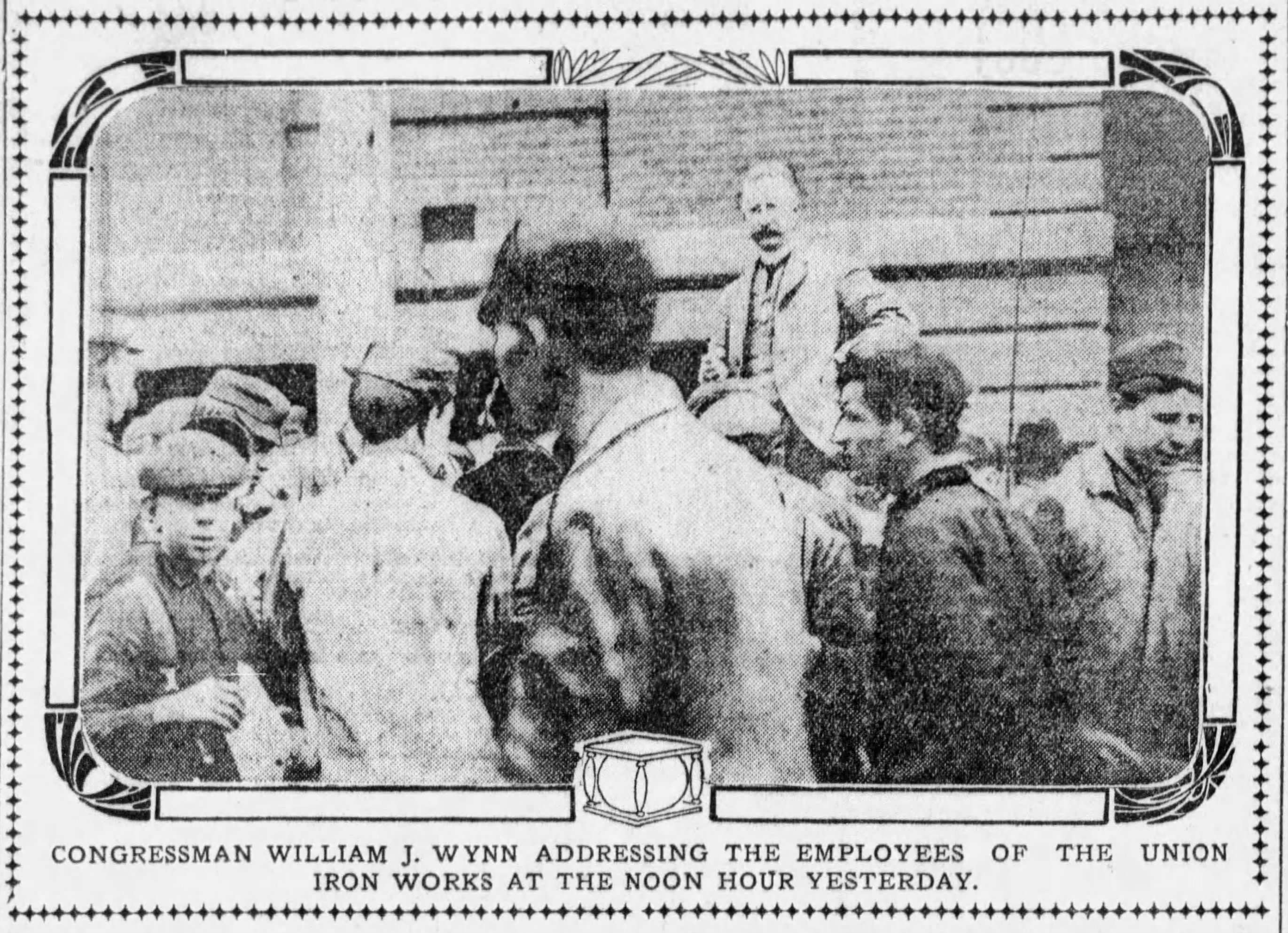
Congressional candidate William J. Wynn addresses a meeting of Union Iron Works employees, October 7, 1904

In 1902, the Union Iron Works was absorbed into a combine called the United States Shipbuilding Company and was mired in three years of litigation. In 1905, the entire 40-acre (160,000 m^{2}) shipyard was purchased by Bethlehem Shipbuilding Corporation for one million dollars. Charles M. Schwab stood on the steps of the UIW office building on 20th Street during the auction. At this point, he was the only bidder. Schwab was widely believed to have engineered the demise of the U.S. Shipbuilding Corporation in order to gain control of the industry. Whether or not that was true, he certainly benefited from the collapse of the US Shipbuilding combine.

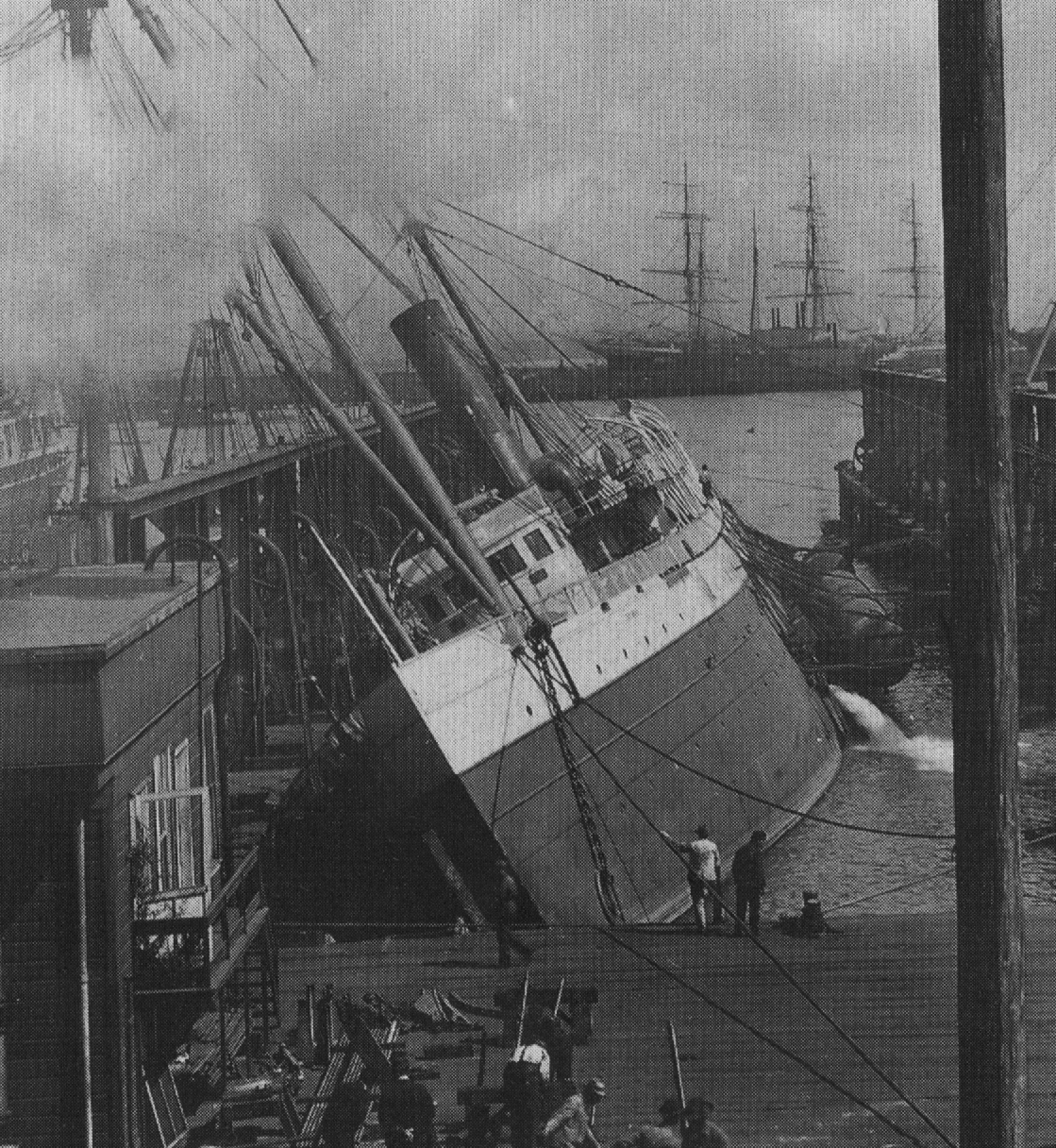
Columbia rolled over at the company dry dock following the earthquake.

At the time of the 1906 San Francisco earthquake, the coastal passenger liner Columbia of the San Francisco and Portland Steamship Company had been undergoing a refit at the yard's hydraulic drydock. The earthquake caused the iron-hulled Columbia to shift off her supports and roll onto the drydock on her starboard side. This damaged the drydock, a key feature of the yard, beyond economic repair. Columbia on the other hand, despite being partially flooded and damaged, was repaired and returned to service in January 1907.

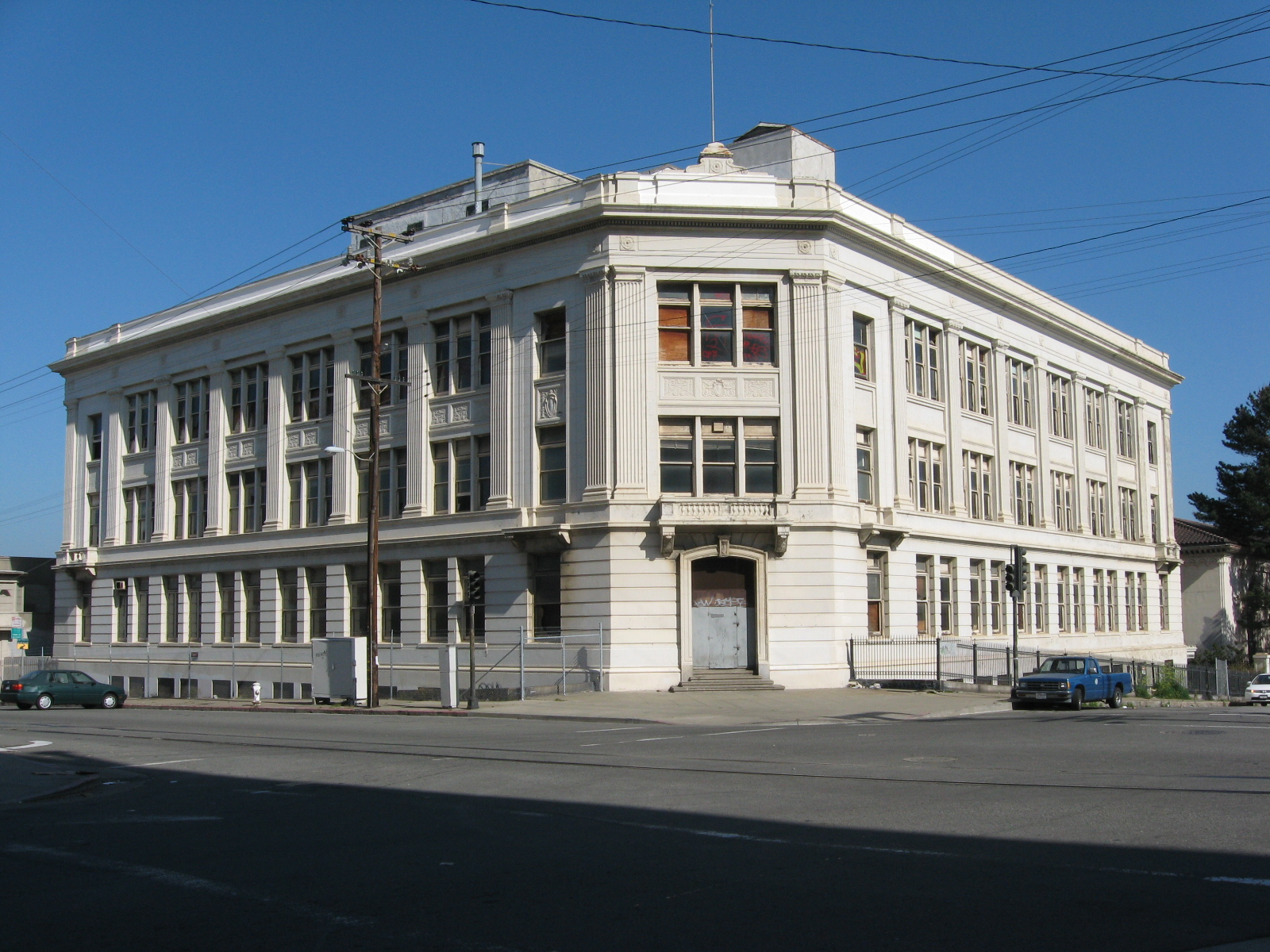
Former Bethlehem Shipbuilding Corporation headquarters (also known as Building 101) in Potrero Point, 2007

In 1908, Bethlehem Shipbuilding Corporation bought the Hunter's Point drydocks. In the pre-World War I era, Union Iron Works built several navy ships that became internationally famous due to the Spanish–American War including Commodore Dewey's flagship the Olympia. After 1905, the shipyard operated as part of Bethlehem Steel, and produced both warships and merchant ships. The shipyard was expanded in 1911 by purchasing Risdon Iron Works, the land next to the shipyard. Risdon Iron Works built locomotives, this was closed and a new shipyard was built to build US Navy including destroyers and submarines. Risdon Iron Works was founded by John Risdon of Saline, Michigan in 1896. Risdon Iron Works started by building boilers, iron pipes, steam engines and gas engines. From 1873 to 1909 Risdon Iron Works also built ships, tugs, ferries and barges. John Risdon held the patents for the first river mining dredge.

During World War II, the yard built C1-B cargo ships, Atlanta-class cruisers, Benson-class destroyers, Buckley-class destroyer escorts, Allen M. Sumner-class destroyers, YG and YCV Barges and Fletcher-class destroyers.

Shipbuilding declined and ended after the end of the war in 1945, and the yards were used for ship repairs and conversions. The shipyard reopened in 1952 and closed again in 1981. In 1982, the city of San Francisco purchased the Bethlehem Steel site for one dollar and leased the site to Southwest Marine under the name San Francisco Drydock, later selling it to BAE Systems.

== World War II slipways ==
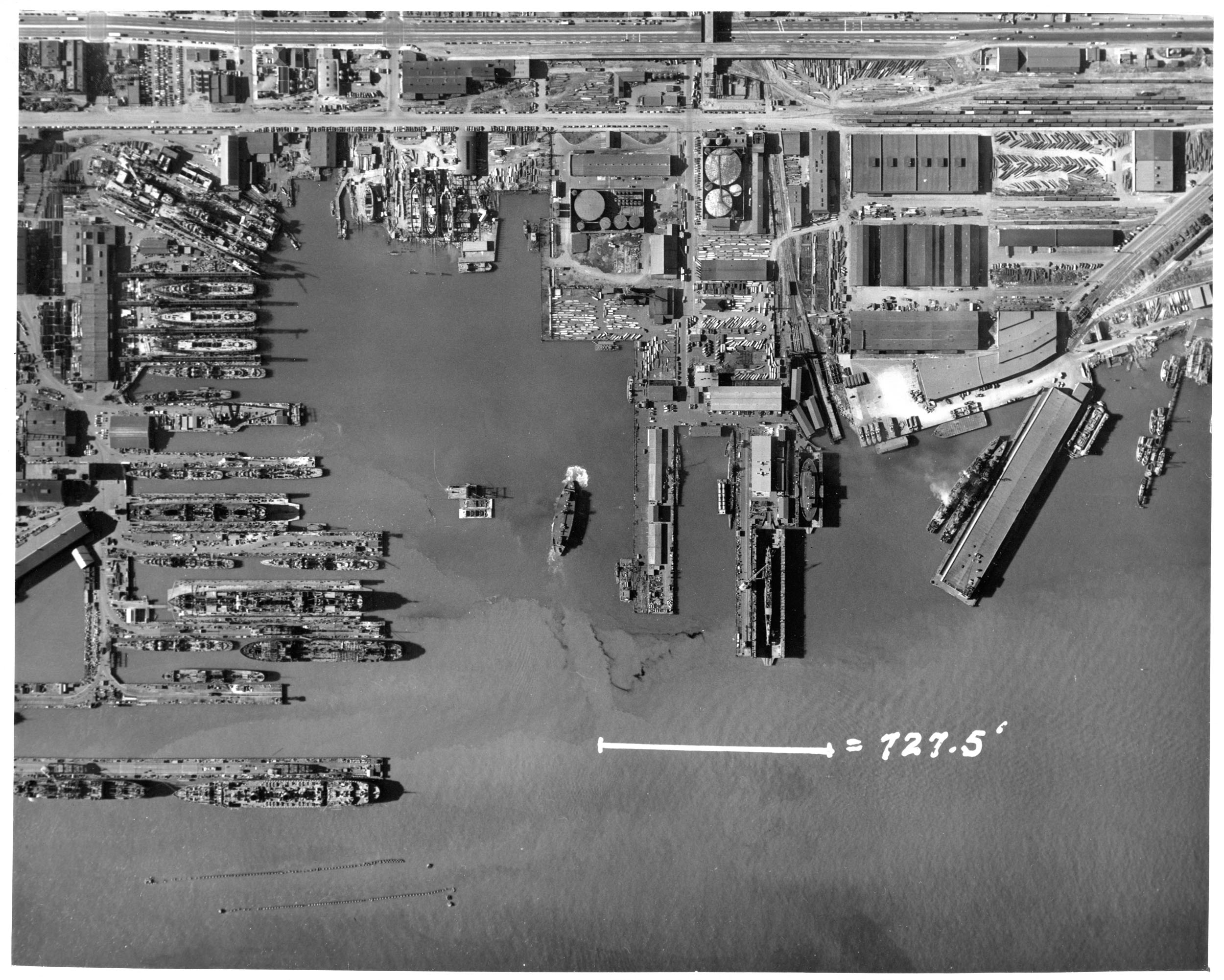
December 1943, ways 1–4 in top left corner

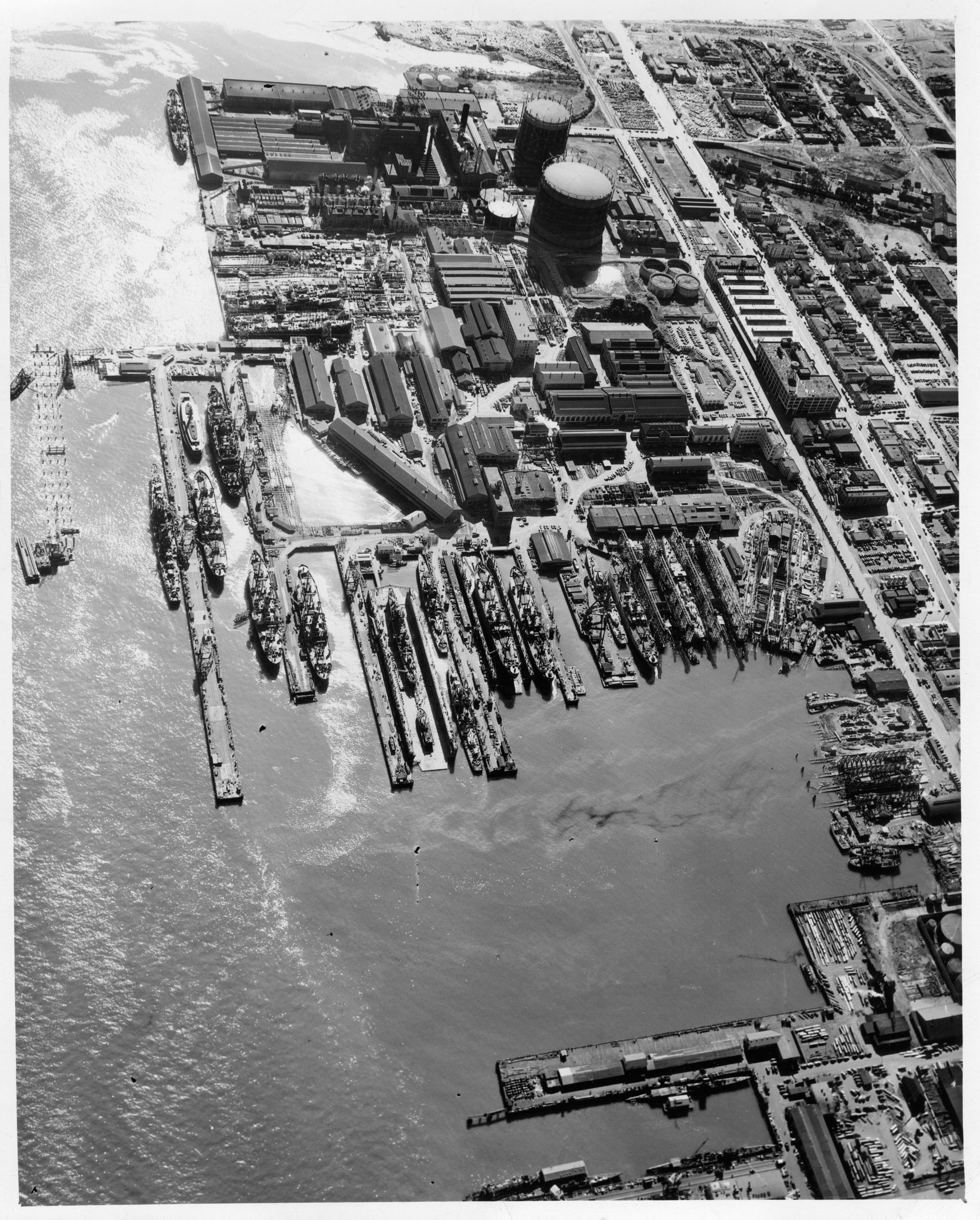
February 1945, the Navy annex is to the left of the large storage tanks

Slipway	Width	Length	Angle	Date
1	60 feet (18 m)	450 feet (140 m)	N - S	1885–1915
2	60 feet (18 m)	450 feet (140 m)	N - S	1890s-1915
3	60 feet (18 m)	450 feet (140 m)	N - S	1890s-1915
4	99 feet (30 m)	550 feet (170 m)	NE - SW	1890s-1941
5	76 feet (23 m)	400 feet (120 m)	E - W	1941
6	84 feet (26 m)	660 feet (200 m)	E - W	1941
7	84 feet (26 m)	660 feet (200 m)	E - W	1941
8	76 feet (23 m)	400 feet (120 m)	E - W	1941

== Locomotives built ==
The named locomotives built by Union Iron Works were:

- for the San Francisco and San Jose Railroad
  - California, Atlantic, Union
- for the Central Pacific Railroad
  - A. A. Sargent
- for the Pittsburg Railroad
  - Mt. Diablo, Boston, Sampson
- for the Black Diamond Coal Mining Railroad (also known as the "Black Diamond Railroad")
  - D. O. Mills
- for the California Pacific Railroad
  - Calistoga
- for the Virginia and Truckee Railroad
  - Lyon, Ormsby, Storey
- for the San Francisco and North Pacific Railroad
  - W. C. Ralston, J. G. Downey, Geyser, Santa Rosa, Ukiah
- for the Battle Mountain and Lewis Railroad
  - John D. Hall, Starr Grove
- S. H. Harmon for the Gualala Railroad
- F. Camacho for the Acajutla and Sonsonate Railroad

== Ships built ==
Some of the ships and ferries built by Union Iron Works include:

- El Primero launched in 1893, still in service as of 2019
- USS Oregon launched in 1893
- USS Wisconsin launched in 1898
- Berkeley, Southern Pacific Railroad ferry 1898, constructed simultaneously with USS Wisconsin in an adjacent drydock. First complete ferry built by Union Iron Works
- San Pablo, Atchison, Topeka & Santa Fe Railroad passenger ferry. 1899. Sold for scrap in 1937. Hull became first fish reduction plant on San Pablo Bay
- Tamalpais, 1900 Northwest Railroad passenger ferry. Burned for scrap 1947
- USS Ohio launched in 1901
- USS Monterey launched in 1891
- USS Wyoming launched in 1900
- USS Wheeling launched in 1897
- USS Marietta launched in 1897
- USS Charleston launched in 1888
- USS San Francisco launched 26 October 1889
- USS Olympia launched in 1892. Admiral Dewey's flagship at the Battle of Manila Bay
- USS Tacoma a Denver-class cruiser launched in 1903
- USS Milwaukee a St. Louis-class cruiser launched in 1904
- Japanese cruiser Chitose launched in 1898
- Adder-class submarines USS Grampus and USS Pike for the United States Navy in 1902 and 1903
- San Pedro, 1910 Atchison Topeka & Santa Fe Railroad passenger ferry. Renamed Treasure Island when it joined Key System in 1938
- Napa Valley, 1910 Monticello Steamship Company passenger ferry. Sold and resold until scrapped at Portland, Oregon in 1956
- Tanker SS Acme for the United States Shipping Board in 1916
- Bainbridge-class destroyers USS Paul Jones, USS Perry and USS Preble for the United States Navy between 1900 and 1902
- SS Fred W. Weller steel tanker for Standard Oil of New Jersey, launched 8 August 1917
- 3 tankers for Union Oil of California
  - Olinda, La Brea, Los Angeles
- 6 tankers for Pan American Petroleum and Transport Company (1917–1920)
  - George G. Henry, Wilhelm Jebsen, S. M. Spalding, Paul H. Harwood, William H. Doheny, Franklin K. Lane
- 6 of 27 R-class submarines
  - first keel laid: R-16, 26 April 1917, last: R-19, 23 June 1917
  - first launch: R-15, 10 December 1917, last: R-19, 28 January 1918
  - R-15 (SS-92) ... R-20 (SS-97)
- 12 of 51 S-class submarines
  - S-30 (SS-135) ... S-41 (SS-146)
- 26 of 111 Wickes-class destroyers for the United States Navy between 1917 and 1919
  - first keel laid: Ringold, 20 October 1917, last: Stansbury, 9 December 1918
  - first launch: McKee, 23 March 1918, last: Stansbury, 16 May 1919
  - 8 are launched on 4 July 1918
  - McKee (DD-87) ... Gridley (DD-92)
  - Schley (DD-103) ... Ludlow (DD-112)
  - Burns (DD-171) ... Stansbury (DD-180)
- 40 of 156 Clemson-class destroyers for the United States Navy between 1918 and 1921
  - Chauncey (DD-296) ... Melvin (DD-335)
- 3 ferries for Six Minute Ferry Co. auto ferry. Short-lived ferry company funded by "Sunny Jim" James Rolph
  - San Mateo, Shasta, Yosemite
- 3 ferries for the Richmond–San Francisco Transportation Company in 1924
  - El Paso, New Orleans, Klamath
- 3 of 6 Steel Electric class ferries for the Southern Pacific Railroad in 1927
  - Fresno, Stockton, Mendocino
- 2 of 4 Gridley-class destroyers
  - McCall (DD-400), Maury (DD-401) for the United States Navy in 1937 and 1938
- 5 of 95 C1-B
  - contract date: 18 Sep 1939
  - Cape San Martin, launched 6 Aug 1940, delivered 3 Feb 1941 to Grace Line
  - Alcoa Pioneer, launched 4 Oct 1940, delivered to Alcoa Steamship Company
  - Alcoa Pilgrim, laid down 8 Aug 1940, launched 10 Jan 1941
  - Alcoa Patriot, laid down 9 Oct 1940, launched 12 March 1941
  - Alcoa Puritan, laid down 15 Jan 1941, launched 3 July 1941
  - detailed description of the design of these vessels in
  - two 450 psi 740 °F water tube boilers
  - 4,000shp Bethlehem Quincy cross compound steam turbine, double reduction gears, one shaft
- following the Two-Ocean Navy Act
- 4 of 8 Atlanta-class cruisers; for the United States Navy between 1941 and 1945
  - Oakland (CL-95), Reno, Flint, Tucson (CL-98)
- 36 of 415 destroyers
  - 9 of 30 Benson-class destroyers for the United States Navy in 1941 and 1942
    - Laffey (DD-459), Woodworth (DD-460)
    - Caldwell (DD-605) ... Kalk (DD-611)
  - 18 of 175 Fletcher-class destroyers for the United States Navy in 1942 and 1943
    - Abner Read (DD-526) ... Yarnall (DD-541)
    - Stockham (DD-683), Wedderburn (DD-684)
  - 6 of 58 Allen M. Sumner-class destroyers for the United States Navy in 1944 and 1945
    - Putnam (DD-757) ... Henley (DD-762)
  - 3 of 98 Gearing-class destroyers
    - William C. Lawe (DD-763) ... Keppler (DD-765)
    - in addition: Lansdale (DD-766), Seymour D. Owens (DD-767) cancelled, launched incomplete
- 12 of 563 destroyer escorts and APDs
  - 12 of 148 Buckley-class destroyer escorts for the United States Navy in 1943 and 1944
    - Foreman (DE-633) ... Vammen (DE-644)

Ships reconstructed by the Union Iron Works include:

- SS Columbia - Refitted unsuccessfully due to heavy damage caused by the 1906 San Francisco earthquake. Refit and repairs completed elsewhere.

== See also ==
- Alameda Works Shipyard
- California during World War II § Ship building
- Potrero Point
- Pier 70, San Francisco
- San Francisco Maritime National Historical Park
