= MV Willapa =

History
- Name: 1927-1940 Fresno; 1940-c. 1990s Willapa; c. 1990s-2009 Fresno
- Namesake: Extinct Willapa tribe of Southwestern Washington; meaning unknown
- Owner: 1927-1940: Southern Pacific-Golden Gate Ferries; 1940-1951: Puget Sound Navigation Company; 1951-1967: WSDOT
- Operator: Southern Pacific-Golden Gate Ferries; 1940-1951: Black Ball Line; 1951-1967: Washington State Ferries
- Builder: Bethlehem Steel, San Francisco
- Completed: 1927
- In service: 1927
- Out of service: 1967
- Refit: 1941
- Identification: IMO number: 7619795; Call sign: WB4495
- Fate: Aground on Spud Island on the San Joaquin River, everything but the hull was scrapped

General characteristics
- Class & type: Steel Electric-class ferry
- Tonnage: 1,368 GRT; 930 NRT
- Length: 256 ft (78 m)
- Beam: 65 ft (20 m)
- Deck clearance: 12 ft (3.7 m)
- Installed power: 2,800 hp (2,100 kW)
- Propulsion: 1 × Busch-Sulzer diesel engine
- Speed: 15 knots (28 km/h; 17 mph)
- Capacity: 90 cars (1927); 800–1,500 passengers
- Notes: Source:

MV Willapa was a car ferry that served on the San Francisco Bay and later on Puget Sound. She was one of the Steel Electric-class ferries built in 1927 for service across the San Francisco Bay. Originally named MV Fresno, she was operated by the Southern Pacific Railroad and provided ferry service across the bay.

Fresno served on the San Francisco Bay for ten years, when the completion of the San Francisco Bay Bridge in 1936 and the Golden Gate Bridge in 1937 made the ferries no longer necessary. In 1940, all six Steel Electric ferries were purchased by Puget Sound Navigation Company (PSN) and they were brought up the coast to Puget Sound two at a time, allowing PSN to modernize their ferry fleet.

These ferries were all renamed—Fresno was renamed Willapa—and two of them were significantly modified to be single-ended ferries for use on the Seattle-Bremerton ferry route. These two ferries were Willapa and Enetai, which had already been serving on the Bremerton ferry route while two other Steel Electrics were being readied for service. The pilothouse and propeller on one end of Willapa was removed and the rudder on that end was welded straight. The diesel-electric propulsion was removed and it was replaced with a 2,800-horsepower (2,100 kW) Busch-Sulzer direct-drive diesel, which increased her speed to 15 knots (28 km/h; 17 mph). The passenger cabin was also enlarged, increasing her passenger capacity from 800 to 1,500 passengers.

These modifications made both Willapa and Enetai better suited for the hour-long Seattle-Bremerton route, which was seeing an increase in traffic with more people commuting to and from the Puget Sound Naval Shipyard in Bremerton, where more warships were being built in preparation for World War II. The modifications that Willapa and Enetai received made them no longer true Steel Electric-class ferries.

Willapa continued service between Seattle and Bremerton from 1940 until 1967, when she was retired. Her running mates on that route included Chippewa, her sister Enetai, and Kalakala. For a short period during late-World War II, the steamers SS Malahat and SS City of Sacramento also served on the route.

In 1951, all of PSN's routes and almost all their vessels, including Willapa, were purchased by Washington State to form Washington State Ferries (WSF). In 1953, all six Steel Electrics had their car deck windows replaced with round portholes. By the mid-1960s, WSF began building four Super-class ferries to replace Willapa, Enetai, and Kalakala. These vessels were all single-ended and by the 1960s were no longer considered faster than double-ended vessels and their engines were expensive to run and maintain. Once the first Super-class ferry Hyak arrived, Willapa and Kalakala were retired. Hyak was much faster and larger than the older ferries.

Willapa was sold to a group of San Francisco investors who moved her back to the Bay area and changed her name back to Fresno. However, the vessel was neglected and eventually sank at her berth in 30 feet of water. She was partially submerged for six months until a salvage company raised the vessel and patched her hull with concrete. Her hull was still in poor shape and constant pumping was required to keep the vessel afloat. By October 2006, after unsuccessful attempts to sell her on eBay earlier that year, her owner was planning to sell the vessel for scrap. In November 2009, the vessel was scrapped by Enterprise Marine Company Inc., resulting in the Santa Rosa (aka Enetai) being the only remaining Steel Electric-class ferry.
