= MV Quinault =

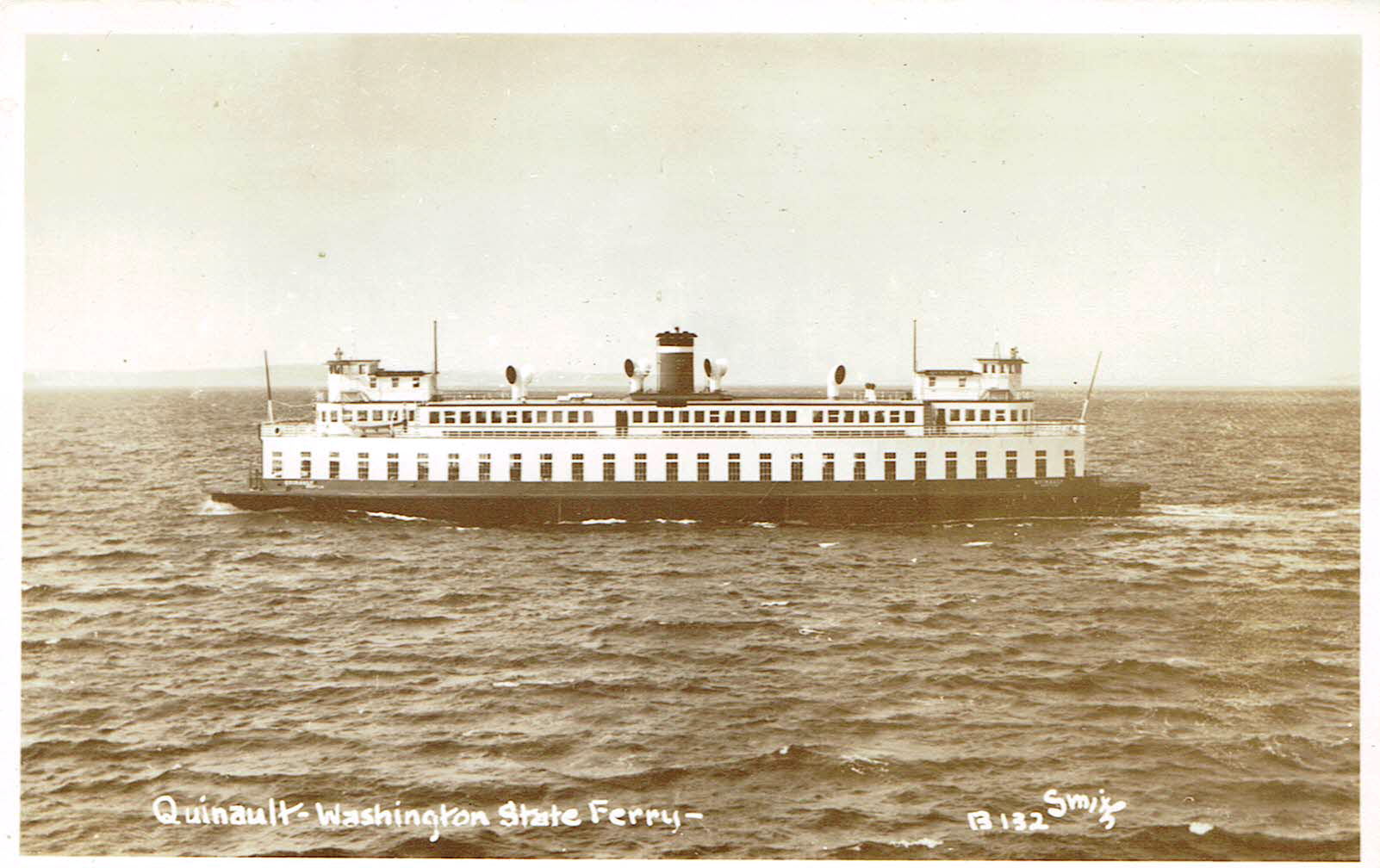
- MV Quinault - Real Photo Post Card (RPPC)

History
- Name: 1927–1940: Redwood Empire; 1940–present: Quinault
- Owner: 1927–1940: Southern Pacific-Golden Gate Ferries Ltd; 1940–1951: Puget Sound Navigation Company; 1951–2009: WSDOT
- Operator: 1927–1940: Southern Pacific-Golden Gate Ferries Ltd; 1940–1951: Black Ball Line; 1951–2009: Washington State Ferries
- Completed: Built: 1927; Refit: 1985
- In service: 1927
- Out of service: November 20, 2007
- Identification: IMO number: 8836156; Official Number: D226738; Call Sign: WA9820
- Fate: Scrapped in 2009, Ensenada, Mexico

General characteristics
- Class & type: Steel Electric-class auto/passenger ferry
- Length: 256 ft (78 m)
- Beam: 73 ft 10 in (22.5 m)
- Draft: 12 ft 9 in (3.9 m)
- Deck clearance: 13 ft 2 in (4.0 m)
- Installed power: Total 2,896 hp (2,160 kW) from 2 x diesel-electric engines
- Speed: 12 knots (22 km/h; 14 mph)
- Capacity: 616 passengers; 59 vehicles (max 24 commercial)

MV Quinault was a Steel Electric-class ferry operated by Washington State Ferries.

Originally built as MV Redwood Empire in Oakland, California for Northwestern Pacific, she started out serving Southern Pacific Railways on their Golden Gate Ferries line on San Francisco Bay. She was purchased by the Puget Sound Navigation Company (PSN) in 1940, brought to Puget Sound and renamed Quinault after the Quinault people, serving PSN until Washington State Ferries acquired and took over operations in 1951. In 2002, Quinault was featured in a scene in the movie The Ring.

On November 20, 2007, the entire Steel Electric class was withdrawn from service due to hull corrosion issues. The Quinault was not in service at the time. On June 19, 2009, Washington State Ferries sold Quinault and the other Steel Electrics for $200,000.00 to Eco Planet Recycling, Inc. of Chula Vista, California. In August 2009 the ferry was towed out of Eagle Harbor to Ensenada, Mexico and was cut up for scrap.
