= Steel Electric-class ferry =

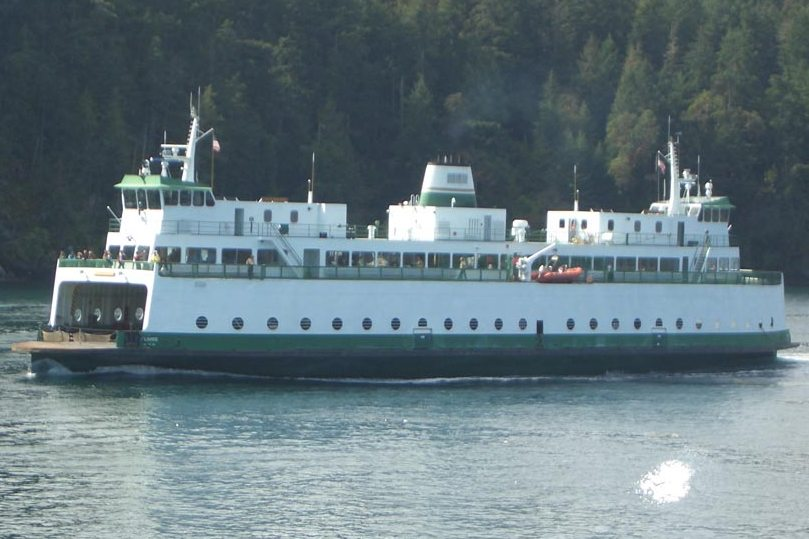
- The MV Illahee in the San Juans

Class overview
- Operators: 1927–1940 Southern Pacific-Golden Gate Ferries Ltd; 1940–1951 Black Ball Line; 1951–2007 Washington State Ferries
- Succeeded by: Super class; Kwa-di Tabil class
- Built: 1927; Refit: 1981–1987
- In service: 1927–2007
- Completed: 6
- Retired: 6
- Preserved: 1

General characteristics
- Type: auto/passenger ferry
- Tonnage: 1,368 GT; 930 NT
- Length: 256 ft (78.0 m)
- Beam: 73 ft 10 in (22.5 m)
- Draft: 12 ft 9 in (3.9 m)
- Deck clearance: 13 ft 9 in (4.2 m)
- Installed power: Total 2,896 hp (2,160 kW) from 2 x diesel-electric engines
- Speed: 12 knots (22 km/h; 14 mph)
- Capacity: 616 passengers; 59–64 vehicles (max 24 commercial)

The Steel Electric-class ferries are a class of auto/passenger ferries that became part of the Washington State Ferry System when Puget Sound Navigation Company was acquired in 1951. They were built in San Francisco Bay for service on Southern Pacific and Northwestern Pacific Railroad routes across the bay.

== History ==
The Steel Electric-class ferries were built in 1927 for service with the Southern Pacific Transportation Company. After a decade of service in San Francisco Bay, they became of little use due to the completion of the San Francisco–Oakland Bay Bridge in 1936 and the Golden Gate Bridge in 1937.

In 1940 they were sold to Puget Sound Navigation Company, also known as the "Black Ball Line". Two of the ferries, the Santa Rosa and Fresno were renamed Enetai and Willapa respectively. They were extensively rebuilt and had their engines replaced. Both were converted into single-ended boats which made them faster and more suitable for use on the Seattle–Bremerton ferry route. These modifications meant that they were no longer technically part of the Steel Electric- class. In 1951, the Steel Electrics, and almost all of Black Ball's fleet, was purchased by Washington State Ferries (WSF). In 1953, WSF replaced the car deck windows with portholes on all the Steel Electrics. In 1967 the Enetai and Willapa were sold. They were replaced by two Super-class ferries, the MV Hyak and MV Yakima, on the Bremerton route. In the 1980s the four remaining boats were given an overhaul and continued to serve until November 2007.

The six boats were fairly different. The Enetai and Willapa were both converted into single-ended boats and had their engines replaced. The Klickitat was rebuilt before the other ferries and had a shorter cabin and lacked an elevator. The remaining three all had elevators.

== Vessels and engines ==
These vessels used diesel-electric engines.

Construction data
Washington name	SP name	Number	Builder
MV Willapa	Fresno	226344	Bethlehem Steel, San Francisco
MV Klickitat	Stockton	226567	Bethlehem Steel, San Francisco
MV Illahee	Lake Tahoe	226588	Moore Dry Dock, Oakland
MV Enetai	Santa Rosa	226599	General Engineering & Dry Dock, Alameda
MV Nisqually	Mendocino	226712	Bethlehem Steel, San Francisco
MV Quinault	Redwood Empire	226738	Moore Dry Dock, Oakland

=== Willapa ===
The keel was laid on 8 November 1926 and launch was on 16 January 1927. The ferry was christened Fresno by Miss Shirley Harding, daughter of Southern Pacific's engineer of standards. The $525,000 ferry went into service between San Francisco and Oakland, California in April. It had an all-electric galley for the dining room and capacity for 100 automobiles. During a storm in January 1932, Fresno was disabled when heavy seas shorted the electrical power plant on an evening bay crossing from San Francisco to Oakland. The ferry drifted and nearly reached Alcatraz Island before tugs were able to tow it to Oakland. After 28 years in Puget Sound, Washington State declared Willapa surplus in 1968. After years of languishing, she was turned into a storage warehouse under her old name, Fresno. The owners, Parker Oceanic, never did much maintenance and was sold to NYMET Holdings, a salvage firm. The ferry was scrapped in Stockton, California in 2009.

=== Klickitat ===
Keel was laid on 15 November 1926, launch was 5 March 1927. Service between San Francisco and Oakland began in May. The ferry was christened Stockton by Miss Louise Shoup, daughter of Southern Pacific's president, Paul Shoup.

=== Illahee ===
Launch was 23 March 1927, and service between San Francisco and Oakland began in June. The ferry was christened Lake Tahoe by Miss Helen Dyer, daughter of Southern Pacific's general manager. As Lake Tahoe, the ferry was involved in a minor collision with the Southern Pacific ferry Oakland in dense fog on 14 August 1943. This ferry made its last Southern Pacific San Francisco Bay auto run on 16 May 1940. The tug Commissioner towed this ferry out of San Francisco Bay on 10 August 1940 bound for Puget Sound. The tow line broke off Trinidad, California and the ferry drifted for 36 hours until it could be towed to Humboldt Bay for emergency repairs and continuing northward.

=== Enetai ===
This ferry was built as Santa Rosa and inaugurated the Northwestern Pacific auto ferry service between San Francisco and a new terminal at the foot of Mission Street in Sausalito on 1 July 1927. After 28 years in Puget Sound, Washington State declared Enetai surplus in 1968. She was purchased for restoration and is now the headquarters of Hornblower Yachts in San Francisco, California under her old name, Santa Rosa.

=== Nisqually ===
This ferry was built as Mendocino to inaugurate Northwestern Pacific service across the mouth of San Francisco Bay.

=== Quinault ===
This ferry was built as Redwood Empire to inaugurate Northwestern Pacific service across the mouth of San Francisco Bay. The tug Commissioner towed this ferry out of San Francisco Bay on 10 August 1940 bound for Puget Sound.

== Withdrawal from service ==
Corrosion on the Steel Electric hulls was discovered during 2007 inspections. On November 20, 2007, the Washington State Secretary of Transportation, Paula Hammond, announced that Washington State Ferries (WSF) would pull all of the Steel Electric-class vessels out of service on that same day. The decision closed the Port Townsend-Keystone route until WSF began to operate the high-speed passenger-only ferry Snohomish on November 23.

During November and December, the Snohomish was removed from this route and began a new interim service between Seattle and Port Townsend. This was done to attract more visitors from Seattle to Port Townsend during the holiday shopping season. During this time, WSF got a third party to operate a passenger only service on the Port Townsend-Keystone route, using a much smaller whale watch boat. The Snohomish was later returned on this route.

WSDOT spent $5 million on repairs of MV Quinault which passed Coast Guard inspection. Governor Christine Gregoire believed that the money would be spent much better building new ferries rather than repairing existing ferries. Secretary Hammond announced that the ferries were to be scrapped. All four of the ferries were berthed at the system's main storage facility in Eagle Harbor, Bainbridge Island. Governor Gregoire announced plans for their replacement. The Washington State Legislature directed WSF to build new ferries that will replace the Steel Electrics. On February 14, 2008, Governor Gregoire signed Senate Bill 6794 into law that authorized the construction of replacement ferries. Despite several proposals to save the Steel Electrics, all four were towed to Ensenada, Mexico in June 2009 to be scrapped.

While new ferries were being built, the state leased the Steilacoom II, used by Pierce County's ferry system to cover the Port Townsend-Keystone route. This ferry was utilized in preference to other state-owned ferries due to the restrictions the Keystone harbor imposes on the size of vessels that serves the route.

The state had hoped that the first ferry would enter service in April 2009. However, in early April 2008 the state rejected a bid of $26 million to build a ferry based on the Steilacoom II design. Reasons cited for the rejection was the bid being $9 million over the state's estimate, the requirement that the shipbuilder complete the ferry within one year or face stiff daily fines and changes to the specifications that included improved safety, security and quality. Washington State Ferries decided not to re-bid the project at the time.

Washington State Ferries commissioned Todd Pacific Shipyards to build the replacement ferries. They became known as the Kwa-di Tabil-class ferry. The design of these ferries is based on the MV Island Home, a vessel that serves the Martha's Vineyard run. The new vessels hold 64 autos, 1,200 passengers and up to 200 bicycles. The first vessel, MV Chetzemoka, was launched in January 2010 and delivered to Washington State Ferries in June 2010. Bids for additional hulls of this class were received by the state in October 2010. The other two ferries of the class, MV Salish and MV Kennewick, were delivered in 2011 and 2012 respectively.
