= USS Stansbury =

Wickes-class destroyer

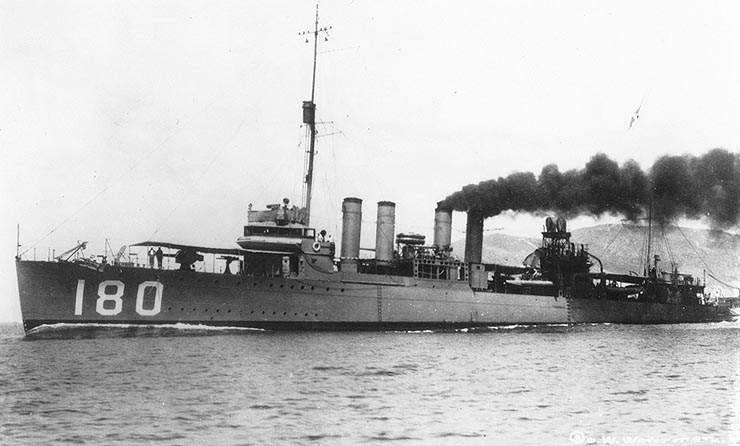
- USS Stansbury underway off San Diego, California, circa 1920-1922

History

United States
- Name: Stansbury
- Namesake: John Stansbury
- Builder: Union Iron Works, San Francisco, California
- Laid down: 9 December 1918
- Launched: 16 May 1919
- Commissioned: 8 January 1920
- Decommissioned: 27 May 1922
- Identification: DD-180
- Recommissioned: 29 August 1940
- Decommissioned: 11 December 1945
- Reclassified: DMS-8, 19 November 1940
- Stricken: 3 January 1946
- Fate: Sold for scrapping, 26 October 1946. Scrapped 25 January 1947

General characteristics
- Class & type: Wickes-class destroyer
- Displacement: 1,284 tons
- Length: 314 ft 4 1/2 in (95.822 m)
- Beam: 30 ft 11 in (9.42 m)
- Draft: 9 ft 2 in (2.79 m)
- Speed: 35 knots (65 km/h)
- Complement: 122 officers and enlisted
- Armament: 4 × 4 in (102 mm)/50 guns; 2 × 3 in (76 mm)/23 guns; 12 × 21 inch (533 mm) tt.

USS Stansbury (DD-180) was a Wickes-class destroyer in the United States Navy during World War II.

== Namesake ==
John Stansbury was born on 28 March 1788 in Baltimore, Maryland. He served under Stephen Decatur as a midshipman on the USS United States during the capture of the British ship, Macedonian. Lieutenant Stansbury was killed during the Battle of Lake Champlain on 11 September 1814.

== Construction and commissioning ==
Stansbury was laid down on 9 December 1918 by Bethlehem Shipbuilding Corporation, Union Iron Works at San Francisco, launched on 16 May 1919, sponsored by Miss Mary Eleanor Trevorrow, and commissioned at Mare Island Navy Yard on 8 January 1920.

== Service history ==
Stansbury served with the Pacific Fleet for over two years during which time she received the designation DD-180. On 27 May 1922, she was decommissioned and berthed at San Diego. She remained inactive for more than 12 years, but the onset of World War II in September 1939 necessitated her reactivation along with that of many of her sister ships. Accordingly, Stansbury was recommissioned at San Diego on 29 August 1940. From there, she moved to the Mare Island Navy Yard to begin her conversion to a high-speed minesweeper. In October, she proceeded to Norfolk, Virginia, where the conversion was completed. On 19 November, she was redesignated a destroyer minesweeper, DMS-8.

=== World War II ===
Stansbury was assigned to the Atlantic Fleet from October 1940 to December 1943. She spent her first year in the Atlantic in minesweeping exercises, in coastwise escort duties, and in conducting maneuvers in the Caribbean Sea. On 30 June 1942, while escorting the City of Birmingham from Norfolk to Bermuda, she attacked a German U-boat with depth charges. A rough sea and rescue operations for survivors of the torpedoed merchantmen handicapped her during the unsuccessful attack. However, her humanitarian effort proved successful, and on 1 July, she pulled into Bermuda with 390 survivors.

The destroyer minesweeper set out from Norfolk on 24 October 1942 to join Task Force (TF) 34, the North Africa invasion force. Stansbury was assigned to Mine Squadron (MinRon) 7 of the Center Attack Group for the landings. The group's assault area was at Fedala just up the coast from Casablanca. The ships arrived off the objective area on 7 November. Stansbury and the other minesweepers made an exploratory sweep of the approaches and then she joined the screen in patrolling the transport area. On 15 November, Electra was torpedoed, but thanks to the efforts of Stansbury, Raven, and Cherokee she remained afloat throughout the night and was beached at Casablanca the following morning. The destroyer minesweeper returned to Hampton Roads, Virginia, on 26 December 1942. For the next year, she plied the eastern coastal waters of the United States and the North Atlantic as far east as Iceland.

On 4 December 1943, Stansbury transited the Panama Canal and joined the Pacific Fleet. She conducted minesweeping exercises off the coast of California for about a month; then stood out of San Diego on 13 January 1944 and headed west with TF 53. The task force reached Lahaina Roads, in the Hawaiian Islands, on 22 January and sailed for the Marshalls the following day. Stansbury operated in the anti-submarine screen both during the voyage to Kwajalein and during the assault itself. She remained in the vicinity from 1 to 7 February, and then joined an amphibious group in returning to Funafuti in the Ellice Islands. On 13 February, she sailed to Nouméa, New Caledonia, arriving on the 20th. For almost four months, Stansbury made the South Pacific circuit, screening numerous amphibious and logistics groups. She visited the Solomons and New Hebrides groups, New Britain, and escorted part of the Admiralty Islands assault force to its objective in mid-April. She returned to the central Pacific, in May, at Eniwetok.

On 10 June, she and nine other destroyer minesweepers departed Eniwetok and, three days later, rendezvoused off Saipan with TF 58, Vice Admiral Marc Mitscher's Fast Carrier Task Force. The minesweepers swept off the west coast of the island while TF 58 covered them. After about five hours of clearing mines, they retired and joined an advance bombardment group from TF 53. Stansbury helped screen the big warships from enemy submarines until the arrival of the initial invasion forces on 15 June, then she joined in a bombardment of Guam. Returning to the vicinity of Saipan and Tinian, she provided fire support for the troops ashore until 26 June when she headed back to Eniwetok. On 21 July, after almost four weeks of absence, she returned to the Marianas with TF 53 to support the recapture of Guam. For a week, she screened the task force from submarines and performed picket patrol for the amphibious units.

On 28 July, she returned to Eniwetok as part of the escort for a transport group. On 7 August, the destroyer minesweeper got underway from Eniwetok for San Francisco, via Pearl Harbor. She reached her destination on 26 August and entered the yard of the General Engineering & Dry Dock Co. Her overhaul was completed on 17 January 1945, and Stansbury sailed to San Diego, arriving the following day. There, she reported for duty with the San Diego Shakedown Group.

For the remainder of the war, she served as a training ship for the Fleet Operational Training Command, Pacific Fleet. Her designation was changed from DMS-8 to AG-107 on 5 June 1945. In September 1945, Stansbury transited the Panama Canal again and headed for Norfolk, Virginia. She was decommissioned at the Norfolk Naval Shipyard on 11 December 1945, and her name was struck from the Navy list on 3 January 1946. Her hulk was sold to Luria Bros. Co. of Philadelphia, Pennsylvania, on 26 October, and she was scrapped on 25 January 1947.

== Awards ==
Stansbury was awarded three battle stars during World War II.

As of 2004, no other ship in the United States Navy has borne this name.
