= Pacific Wharf Company =

Defunct American waterfront holdings company

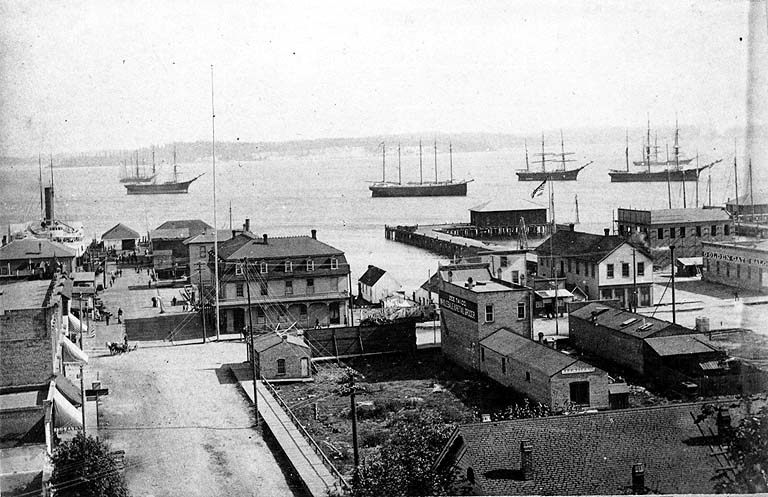
Port Townsend waterfront circa 1890. The large sidewheeler on left is probably Olympian.

The Pacific Wharf Company was a corporation which once controlled much of the waterfront of Port Townsend, Washington.

== Organization ==
Pacific Wharf Company was formed in 1891 by Charles E. Peabody (1857-1926), Walter Oakes, George T. Roberts, and others. The company was formally incorporated on August 8, 1891. According to the articles of incorporation, the company's capital was $59,000. The major stockholders included Charles E. Peabody (200 shares), D.B. Jackson, and Walter Oakes (118 shares each). Oakes was named as chairman of the board of directors and Peabody as president. Peabody and Oakes were well-connected businessmen. Roberts was a steamship captain. Jackson was a successful businessman and a steamboat purser.

== Operations ==
The Pacific Wharf Company owned a wharf and other waterfront holdings in Port Townsend, Washington.

== Later ownership ==
Through corporate reorganizations, Pacific Wharf Company later came under the control of the Puget Sound Navigation Company, which was formed in 1903.
