= MV Illahee =

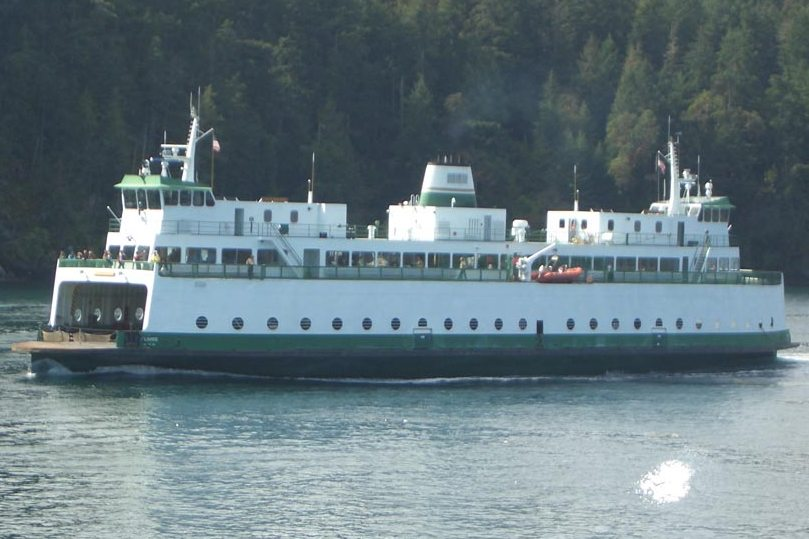
- MV Illahee

History
- Name: 1927-1940: Lake Tahoe; 1940-2009: Illahee
- Owner: 1927-1940: Southern Pacific-Golden Gate Ferries Ltd; 1940-1951: Puget Sound Navigation Company; 1951-2009: WSDOT
- Operator: 1927-1940: Southern Pacific-Golden Gate Ferries Ltd; 1940-1951: Black Ball Line; 1951-2007: Washington State Ferries
- Port of registry: Seattle, Washington USA
- Ordered: September 18, 1926
- Builder: Moore Dry Dock Company, Oakland, California
- Completed: Built: 1927; First Refit: 1958; Second Refit: 1986
- In service: 1927
- Out of service: November 20, 2007
- Identification: IMO number: 8836091; Official Number: 226588; Call sign: WXT9366
- Fate: Scrapped in 2009, Ensenada, Mexico

General characteristics
- Class & type: Steel Electric-class auto/passenger ferry
- Length: 256 ft 2 in (78 m)
- Beam: 73 ft 10 in (22.5 m)
- Draft: 12 ft 9 in (3.9 m)
- Deck clearance: 12 ft 7 in (3.8 m)
- Installed power: Total 2,896 hp (2,160 kW) from 2 x diesel-electric engines
- Speed: 12 knots (22 km/h; 14 mph)
- Capacity: 616 passengers; 59 vehicles (max 24 commercial)

MV Illahee was a Steel Electric-class ferry operated by Washington State Ferries.

Originally built as MV Lake Tahoe in Oakland, California for the Southern Pacific Railroad, she started out serving on SP's Golden Gate Ferries subsidiary on San Francisco Bay. She was purchased by the Puget Sound Navigation Company in 1940, and she was moved to Puget Sound and renamed Illahee until Washington State Ferries acquired and took over operations in 1951.

She was serving on the inter-island route in the San Juan Islands when the entire Steel Electric class was withdrawn from service on November 20, 2007 due to hull corrosion issues.

In the summer of 2009, Illahee and her sisters were sold to Eco Planet Recycling, Inc. of Chula Vista, California. In August 2009 the ferry was towed out of Eagle Harbor and was scrapped in Ensenada, Mexico.

== See also ==
Media related to Category:Illahee (ship, 1927) at Wikimedia Commons
