= MV Nisqually =

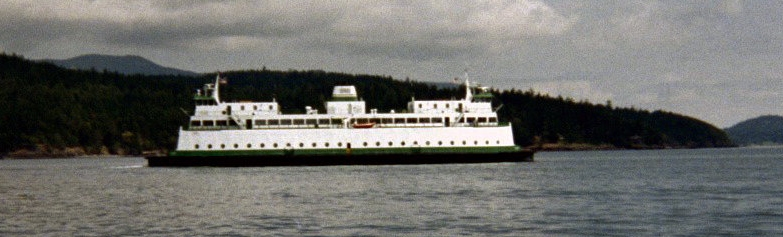
- Ferry MV Nisqually on Puget Sound

History
- Name: 1927–1940: Mendocino; 1940–2011: Nisqually
- Owner: 1927–1940: Southern Pacific-Golden Gate Ferries Ltd; 1940–1951: Puget Sound Navigation Company; 1951–2007: WSDOT
- Operator: 1927–1940: Southern Pacific-Golden Gate Ferries Ltd; 1940–1951: Black Ball Line; 1951–2007: Washington State Ferries
- Port of registry: Seattle, Washington, (United States)
- Launched: 14 April 1927
- Completed: Built in 1927; Rebuilt in 1958 and 1987
- In service: 1927
- Out of service: November 20, 2007
- Identification: IMO number: 8836168; Official Number: 226712; Call sign: WA8696
- Fate: Scrapped, 2011

General characteristics
- Class & type: Steel Electric-class auto/passenger ferry
- Tonnage: 1,368 GT; 930 NT
- Length: 256 ft (78 m)
- Beam: 73 ft 10 in (22.5 m)
- Draft: 12 ft 9 in (3.9 m)
- Deck clearance: 13 ft 2 in (4.0 m)
- Installed power: 2 x diesel-electric engines, total 2,896 hp (2,160 kW)
- Speed: 12 knots (22 km/h; 14 mph)
- Capacity: 616 passengers; 59 vehicles (max 24 commercial)

MV Nisqually was a Steel Electric-class ferry formerly operated by Washington State Ferries.

Originally built as MV Mendocino in San Francisco for Northwestern Pacific Railroad, she started out serving Southern Pacific Railways on their Golden Gate Ferries line on San Francisco Bay. She was purchased by the Puget Sound Navigation Company in 1940, and moved to Puget Sound where she was renamed Nisqually, later being acquired by Washington State Ferries who took over operations in 1951.

In July 1963 Nisqually was working on the Edmonds-Kingston route. The ferry was heading to Edmonds when a tanker struck Nisqually. No one was hurt, but the ferry suffered major damage. If the hull was not sponsoned out 8 feet (2.4 m) in 1958, the ferry would have sunk.

On November 20, 2007, the entire Steel Electric class was withdrawn from service due to hull corrosion issues. Nisqually was not in service at the time.

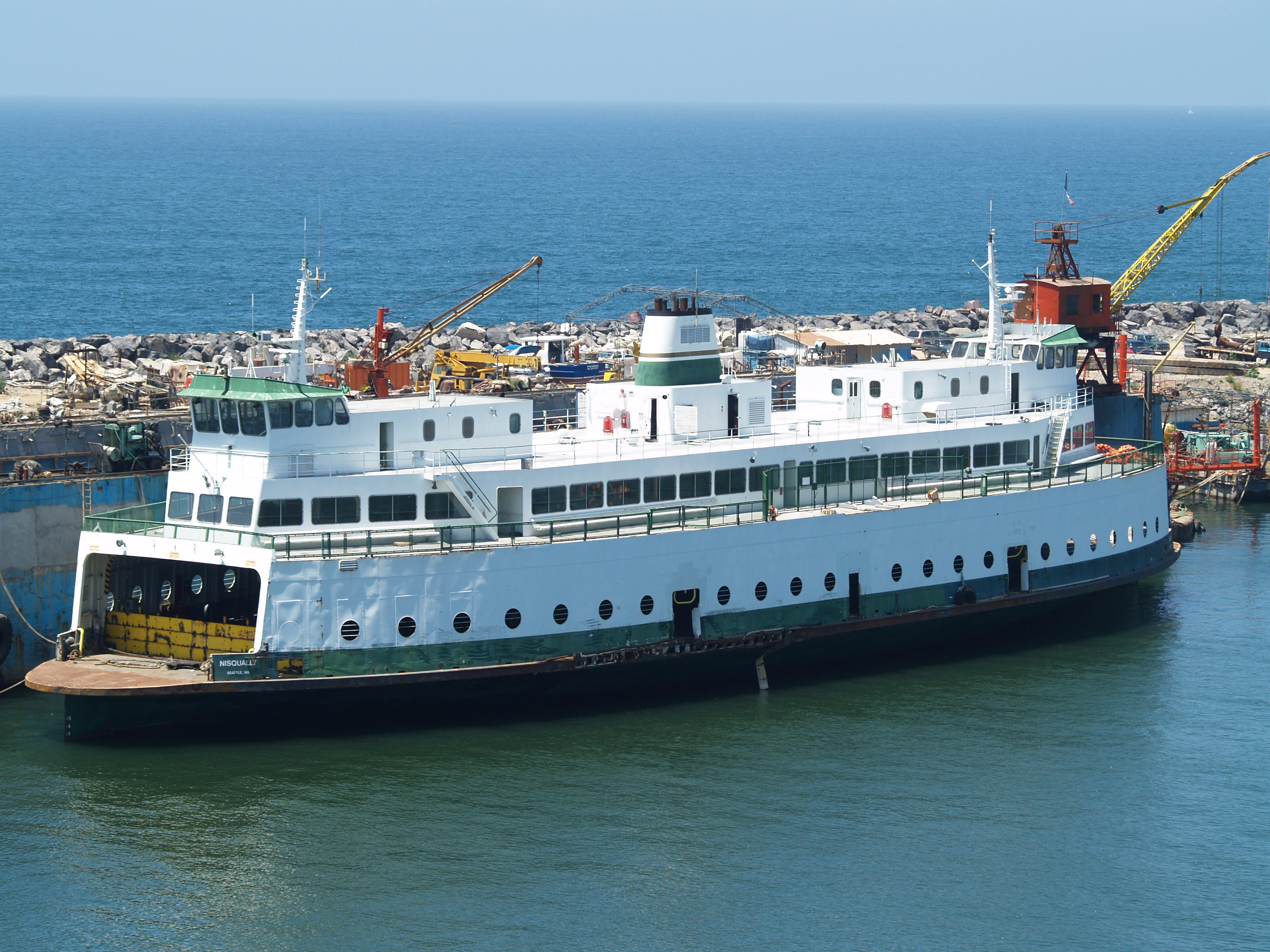
Nisqually at Ensenada, Mexico on May 8, 2010 31°50′49.4″N 116°37′35.4″W

Washington State Ferries sold Nisqually and her sister ferries to Eco Planet Recycling, Inc. of Chula Vista, California for scrap. All four ferries were sold for $200,000. Nisqually and Quinault were towed out of Eagle Harbor on August 7, 2009, arriving in Ensenada, Mexico on August 16. Presumably, Nisqually was cut up sometime between February and April 2011.
