= MV Klickitat =

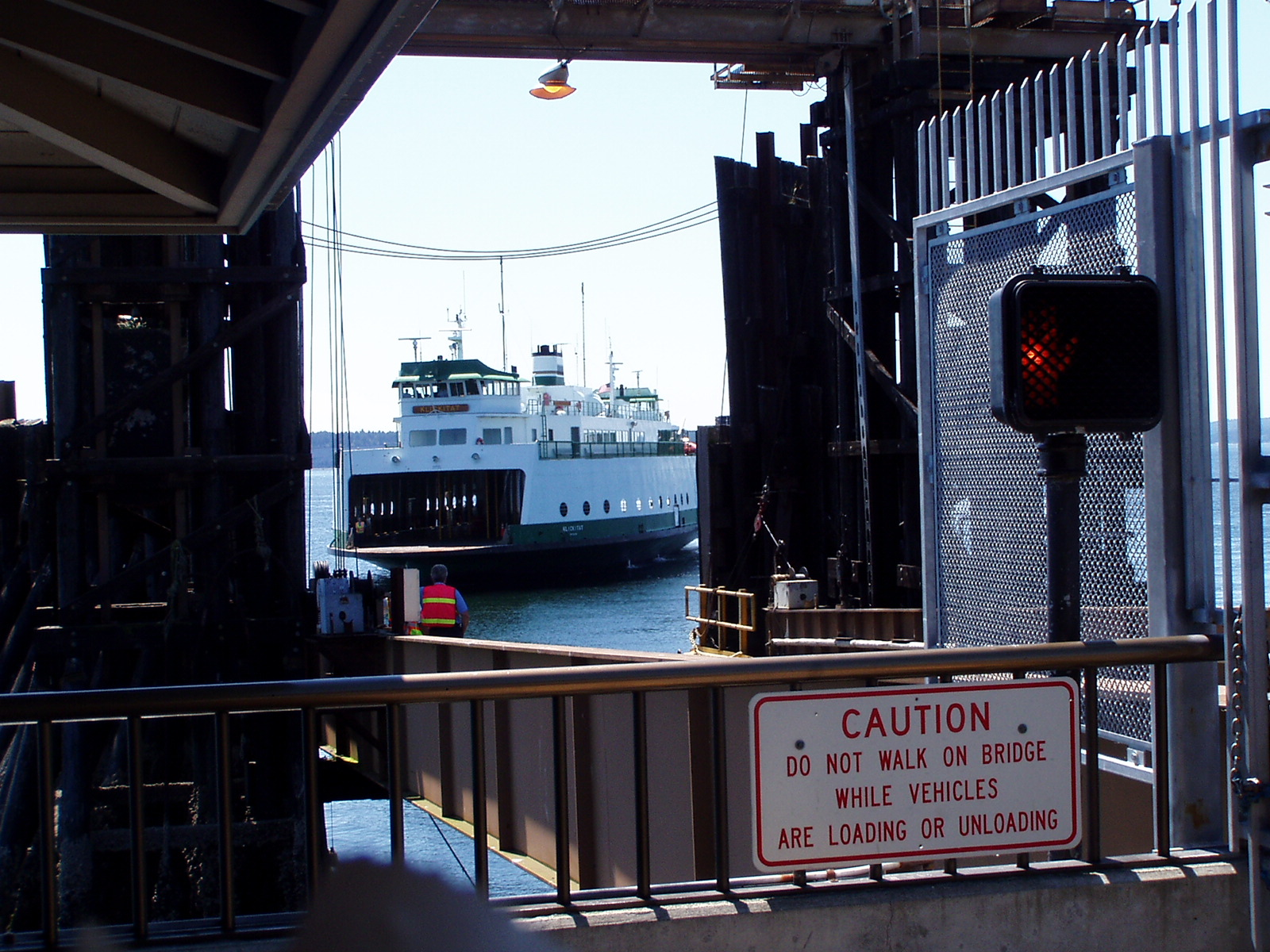
- Klickitat approaching Port Townsend dock in 2004.

History
- Name: 1927–1940: Stockton; 1940–2009: Klickitat
- Owner: 1927–1940: Southern Pacific-Golden Gate Ferries Ltd; 1940–1951: Puget Sound Navigation Company; 1951–present: WSDOT
- Operator: 1927–1940: Southern Pacific-Golden Gate Ferries Ltd; 1940–1951: Black Ball Line; 1951–2007: Washington State Ferries
- Port of registry: Seattle, USA
- Builder: Bethlehem Shipbuilding Corporation, San Francisco, California
- Completed: Built: 1927; Refit: 1958, 1981
- In service: 1927
- Out of service: November 20, 2007
- Identification: IMO number: 8836106; Official Number: 226567; Call Sign: WA6855
- Fate: Scrapped in 2009, Ensenada, Mexico

General characteristics
- Class & type: Steel Electric-class auto/passenger ferry
- Length: 256 ft (78 m)
- Beam: 73 ft 10 in (22.5 m)
- Draft: 12 ft 9 in (3.9 m)
- Deck clearance: 13 ft 4 in (4.1 m)
- Installed power: Total 2,400 hp (1,800 kW) from 2 x diesel-electric engines
- Speed: 12 knots (22 km/h; 14 mph)
- Capacity: 617 passengers; 64 vehicles (max 24 commercial)

MV Klickitat was a Steel Electric-class ferry operated by Washington State Ferries.

Originally built as MV Stockton in San Francisco for Southern Pacific Railroad, she started out serving Southern Pacific Railways on their Golden Gate Ferries line on San Francisco Bay. She was purchased by the Puget Sound Navigation Company in 1940, moved to Puget Sound, and renamed Klickitat. PSN operated her until Washington State Ferries acquired and took over operations in 1951.

In 1978 Klickitat was used for exterior shots in the Emergency! TV movie "Most Deadly Passage", a story about this ferry catching fire while at sea due to gasoline, instead of diesel, being put into one of the ship's fuel tanks. It was being used on the Seattle-Bremerton route in the episode.

She was serving on the Keystone-Port Townsend crossing in November 2007 when the entire Steel Electric class was withdrawn from service due to hull corrosion issues.

In August 2009 Klickitat and the other three Steel Electric ferries were sold to Eco Planet Recycling, Inc. of Chula Vista, California. All four ferries were scrapped in Ensenada, Mexico in the fall of 2009. One of the original 1927 wheelhouses (removed in the 1981 rebuild) of the Klickitat was salvaged and converted into a small house currently located just outside Arlington, Washington.
