= Skagit Kalama-class ferry =

Skagit / Kalama class
Class overview
- Builders: Halter Marine, New Orleans, Louisiana
- Built: 1989
- In service: 1989–present
- Completed: 2
- Lost: 1

General characteristics
- Type: passenger ferry
- Length: 112 feet (34 m)
- Beam: 25 feet (7.6 m)
- Draft: 8 feet (2.4 m)
- Speed: 25 knots (46 km/h; 29 mph)

The Skagit / Kalama-class ferries were high-speed passenger vessels built for Washington State Ferries (WSF) in 1989. The MV Skagit and MV Kalama were the only ferries in this class.

After the 1989 Loma Prieta earthquake, the pair were loaned to San Francisco where they ferried passengers while the damaged San Francisco–Oakland Bay Bridge was repaired. Later the pair served the Seattle–Vashon Island route.

Both vessels were permanently docked in 2009 after WSF was directed to end its passenger-only service, and in 2011 they were sold for $400,000 and expected to be transported to Tanzania where they would provide service between the mainland and Zanzibar. On 18 July 2012, Skagit capsized and sank off the coast of Tanzania, near the island of Unguja. More than 250 people were believed to be on board at the time.
