= Arago (ship) =

Arago was the name of a number of ships and may refer to:

- Arago (1854), a schooner in service in the United States Coast Survey/United States Coast and Geodetic Survey from 1854 to 1861 and from 1866 to 1881 as USCS/USC&GS Arago
- SS Arago (1855), a wooden sidewheel steamer built for transatlantic service and chartered by the Union Army during the American Civil War for transport and diplomatic missions, including the return of the U.S. flag to Fort Sumter
- Arago (1871), a steamer in service in the U.S. Coast Survey/U.S. Coast and Geodetic Survey from 1871 to 1890 as USCS/USC&GS Arago
- Arago (1885), a freighter built by the Union Iron Works at San Francisco's Pier 70 for the Oregon Coal Company
