= Ferryboat Santa Rosa =

American Steel Electric-class ferry

Santa Rosa
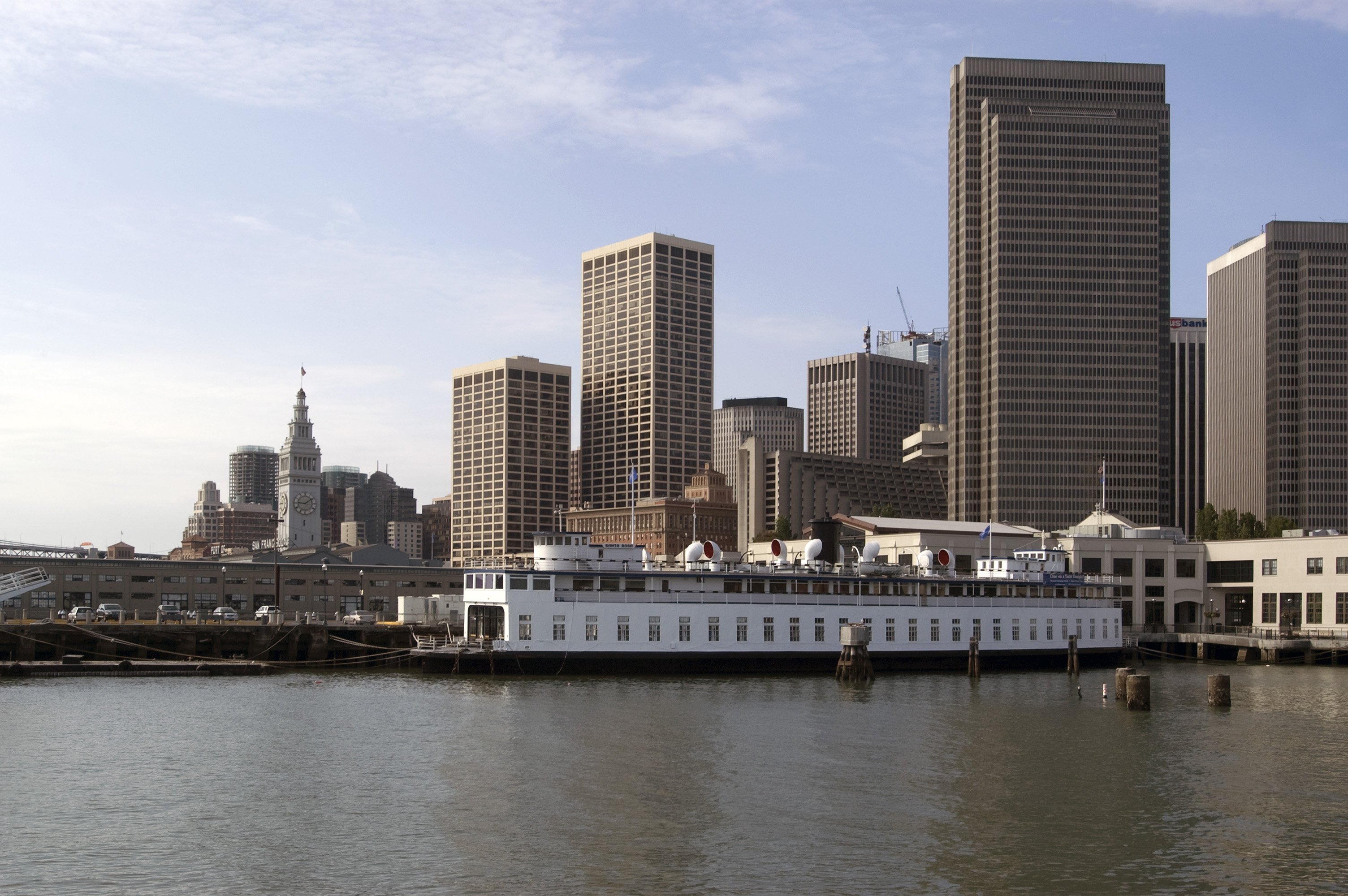
- Santa Rosa at Pier 3 in San Francisco, California in 2008

History
- Name: Santa Rosa (1927–1940); MV Enetai (1940–1989); Ferryboat Santa Rosa (1989–)
- Owner: Golden Gate Ferries (1927–1940); Puget Sound Navigation Company (1940–1951); WSDOT (1951–1968); Donald Clair (1968–1989); Hornblower Cruises & Events (1989–)
- Builder: General Engineering & Dry Dock Company, Alameda, California
- Yard number: 6
- Completed: June 1927
- In service: 1927
- Out of service: 1968
- Refit: 1941
- Refit: 1989
- Identification: Official Number: 226599; Call Sign: WA4715
- Status: serves as banquet facility and office space

General characteristics (as built)
- Class & type: Steel Electric-class ferry
- Tonnage: 2,465 GRT
- Length: 256 ft (78 m)
- Beam: 46 ft 6 in (14.17 m)
- Propulsion: 2 × Diesel-Electric engines, 2,400 hp (1,800 kW)
- Speed: 12 knots (22 km/h; 14 mph)
- Capacity: 616 passengers; 59 vehicles

General characteristics (after 1941 refit)
- Type: single ended auto/passenger ferry
- Beam: 66 ft (20.1 m)
- Draft: 12 ft 9 in (3.9 m)
- Deck clearance: 12 ft (3.7 m)
- Propulsion: 1 × direct-drive Busch-Sulzer diesel, 2,800 hp (2,100 kW)
- Speed: 15 knots (28 km/h; 17 mph)
- Capacity: 1,500 passengers; 90 vehicles

General characteristics (after 1989 refit)
- Notes: restored to original 1927 external appearance, deck converted to banquet facility and offices
- Capacity: 500 passengers
- MV Santa Rosa
- U.S. National Register of Historic Places
- Location within California
- Location: Pier 3, San Francisco, California
- Coordinates: 37°47′54″N 122°23′43″W
- Area: 0.3 acres (0.12 ha)
- Architectural style: ferryboat
- NRHP reference No.: 79000469
- Added to NRHP: 29 May 1979

Santa Rosa was a Steel Electric-class ferry built in Alameda, California, for Northwestern Pacific Railroad. She started out serving Southern Pacific Railways on their Golden Gate Ferries line on San Francisco Bay.

She was purchased by the Puget Sound Navigation Company in 1940, and moved to Puget Sound. Puget Sound Navigation Company, believing that a single ended ferry would be more economical and faster, replaced her engines and converted her to a single-ended ferry, effectively making her no longer a true Steel Electric-class ferry. She was also renamed MV Enetai, which is the name she kept when she was later acquired by Washington State Ferries who took over operations in 1951. The ferry was returned to San Francisco after her sale in 1968, but sat largely unused until purchased by Hornblower Cruises in 1989. Hornblower restored her aft wheelhouse in an attempt to make her look like her original profile from 1927, however the passenger cabin retained the remodeled outline from her 1941 single-end conversion. She is currently moored at Pier 3 in San Francisco, where she serves as office space for Hornblower's Northern California Operations and also as Corporate Headquarters for Hornblower's suite of companies which include:

- Hornblower Cruises & Events
- Alcatraz Cruises
- Statue Cruises
- Niagara Cruises
- Liberty Landing Ferry
- Hornblower Classic Cable Cars
- NYC Ferry Service

The Ferryboat Santa Rosa has since been retired from rental events.
