= MV Kalama =

History
- Name: MV Kalama
- Owner: WSDOT
- Operator: Washington State Ferries
- Port of registry: Seattle, Washington, United States
- Completed: 1989
- Out of service: 2009
- Identification: IMO number: 8645296; Official Number: D949139; Call sign: WAA6310
- Name: Kalama
- Operator: Seagull Sea Transport (Zanzibar)
- Port of registry: Zanzibar (October 25, 2011–)
- Route: Dar es Salaam, Tanzania–Unguja Island, Zanzibar
- Acquired: c. 2011
- In service: c. 2011
- Out of service: July 26, 2012

General characteristics
- Class & type: Skagit Kalama-class passenger ferry
- Length: 112 ft (34.1 m)
- Beam: 25 ft (7.6 m)
- Draft: 8 ft (2.4 m)
- Installed power: Total 2,840 hp (2,120 kW) from 4 diesel engines
- Capacity: 250 passengers

MV Kalama was a Skagit Kalama-class ferry operated by Washington State Ferries (WSF). Skagit and Kalama were constructed in 1989 at Halter Marine in New Orleans, Louisiana. Along with Skagit, she operated the Seattle-Vashon Island passenger-only service. In 2006 WSF was directed to end its passenger-only service, and in 2011 Kalama and Skagit were sold. The vessels were transported to Tanzania to provide service between the mainland and Zanzibar.

Kalama was ordered taken out of service by the Zanzibar government after the loss of Skagit in 2012.
