= MV Skagit =

Ship built in 1989

Coordinates: 6°21′59.99″S 39°09′59.99″E

History
- Name: Skagit
- Owner: WSDOT
- Operator: Washington State Ferries 1990–2009
- Port of registry: Seattle, Washington, United States 1989–2011
- Builder: Halter Marine, New Orleans, Louisiana
- Cost: $5 million
- Completed: 1989
- In service: 1990
- Out of service: 2009
- Identification: IMO number: 8645284; Official Number: D949140; Call sign: WAA6309
- Fate: Sold to Canadian investors after unsuccessful ebay listing
- Name: Skagit
- Operator: Seagull Sea Transport (Zanzibar)
- Port of registry: Zanzibar (October 25, 2011–)
- Route: Dar es Salaam, Tanzania–Unguja Island, Zanzibar
- Acquired: c. 2011
- In service: c. 2011
- Out of service: July 18, 2012
- Fate: Sank near Chumbe Island off Zanzibar; c. 150 people presumed dead.

General characteristics
- Class & type: Skagit Kalama-class passenger ferry
- Length: 112 ft (34.1 m)
- Beam: 25 ft (7.6 m)
- Draft: 8 ft (2.4 m)
- Installed power: Total 2,840 hp (2,120 kW) from four diesel engines
- Propulsion: Diesel Reduction
- Speed: 25 knots (46 km/h; 29 mph)
- Capacity: 250 passengers

MV Skagit was a Skagit Kalama-class passenger ferry originally operated by Washington State Ferries (WSF) from 1989–2009 and then in Tanzania until her sinking in Zanzibar in July 2012.

== Operational history ==
Skagit and MV Kalama were the only two ships of their class in the WSF fleet. Together they served on the Seattle-Vashon Island route (see King County Water Taxi). In 2006, WSF was directed to end its passenger-only service, and in 2011 Skagit and Kalama were sold and transported to Tanzania to provide service between the mainland and Zanzibar.

== Sinking ==
On July 18, 2012, the vessel sank near Chumbe Island while in ferry service in Tanzania. After departing Dar es Salaam bound for Unguja Island (Zanzibar) with more than 250 people on board, the ship struggled in rough seas and sank approximately 10 kilometers (6.2 mi) from Unguja. At least 146 were rescued while as many as 150 were still missing after a day of rescue operations. Early reports attributed the disaster to high winds and overloading of passengers. The ship was certified for a maximum capacity of 250 yet officials said it had 290 aboard at the time.

== Outcome ==
The Zanzibar government blamed the disaster on the ship operating over too long of a distance, and the island's transportation minister resigned. In addition, vessels had been warned not to make the crossing because of the high seas, according to Tanzania's chief meteorologist. After Skagit's loss, Zanzibar barred sister ship MV Kalama from operating and later "deleted" her and three other ferries from its list of sea vessels for safety reasons.

== See also ==
- Sinking of MV Spice Islander I
- List of maritime disasters
