= MV Wishkah =

Prototype Olympic-class ferry

History
- Name: Wishkah
- Owner: Washington State Department of Transportation
- Operator: Washington State Ferries
- Port of registry: Seattle, Washington, United States
- Ordered: 2025
- Builder: Eastern Shipbuilding (Panama City, Florida)
- In service: 2030 (planned)
- Status: Under construction

General characteristics
- Class & type: Olympic-class auto/passenger ferry
- Displacement: 4,384 long tons (4,454 t)
- Length: 405 ft 0 in (123.4 m)
- Beam: 83 ft 2 in (25.3 m)
- Draft: 18 ft (5.5 m)
- Depth: 24 ft 6 in (7.5 m)
- Decks: 3 (2 vehicle decks, 1 passenger deck)
- Deck clearance: 16 ft (4.9 m)
- Propulsion: Hybrid diesel–electric
- Speed: Electric (16 Knots), Diesel (14.5 Knots), Hybrid(17 Knots)
- Capacity: 1,500 passengers; 164 vehicles
- Crew: 14 (12 with sun deck closed)
- Notes: All specifications subject to change

MV Wishkah is a future Olympic-class ferry that will be operated by Washington State Ferries. The vessel will use a hybrid diesel–electric engine and is expected to enter service by 2030, with a capacity of 164 cars and 1,500 passengers. The ferry was named for the Wishkah River on the Olympic Peninsula.

Steel cutting began on August 5, 2026. The vessel is planned to be used on the Mukilteo–Clinton ferry, which is also served by sister vessel MV Suquamish.
