= Puget Sound Navigation Company =

Steamboat and ferry company, founded 1898

Coordinates: 48°24′9.12″N 123°23′59.39″W

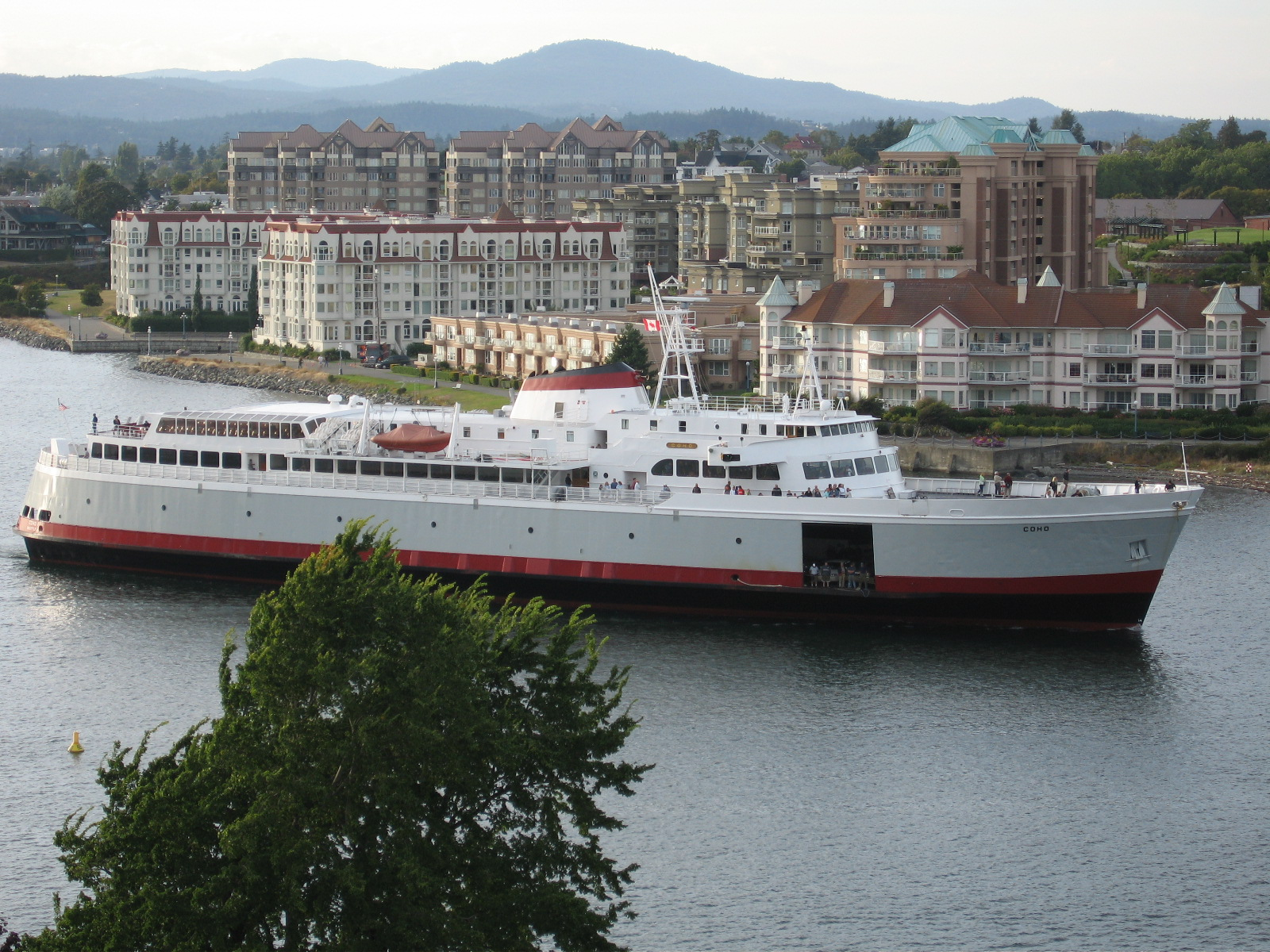
MV Coho in Victoria Harbour, British Columbia, Canada

The Puget Sound Navigation Company (PSNC) was founded by Charles E. Peabody in 1898. Today the company operates an international passenger and vehicle ferry service between Port Angeles, Washington, United States and Victoria, British Columbia, Canada on the MV Coho, through its operating company, Black Ball Ferry Line.

== History ==
First house flag of Puget Sound Navigation Company (1898–1927)

The Black Ball flag (1927-c.1959)

The new Black Ball flag

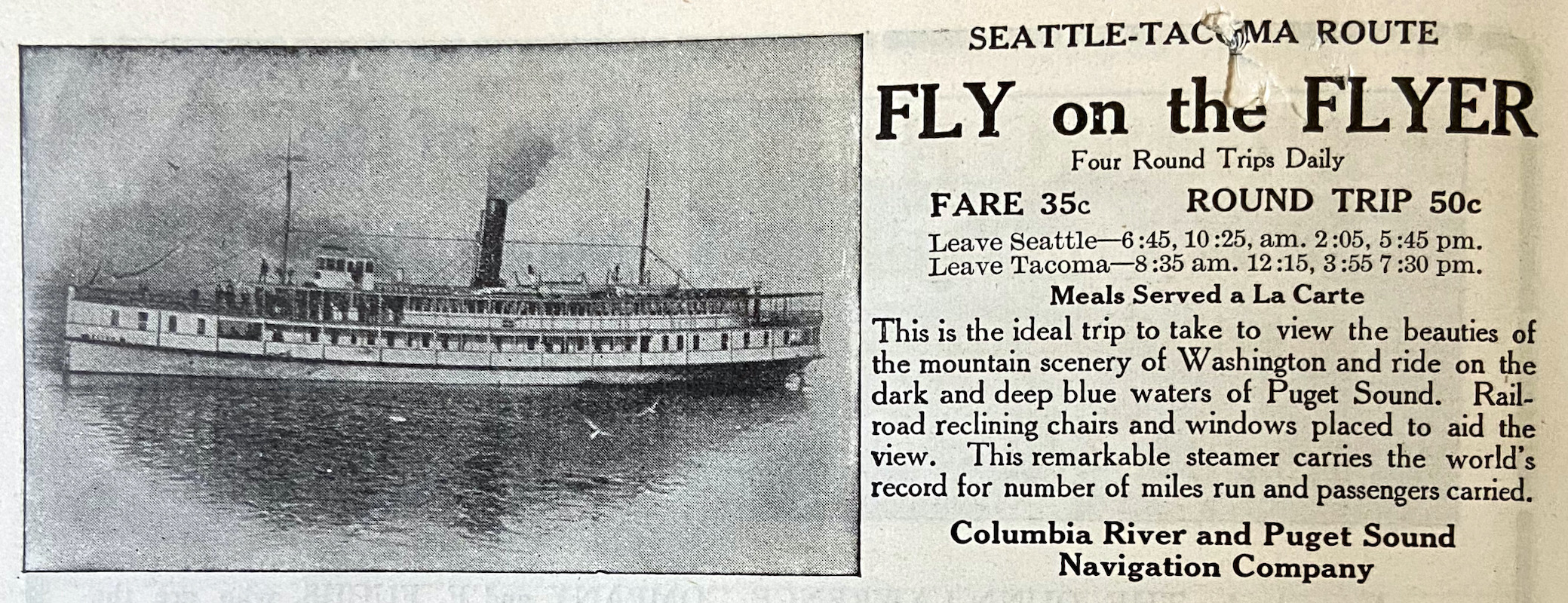
Advertisement of 1906

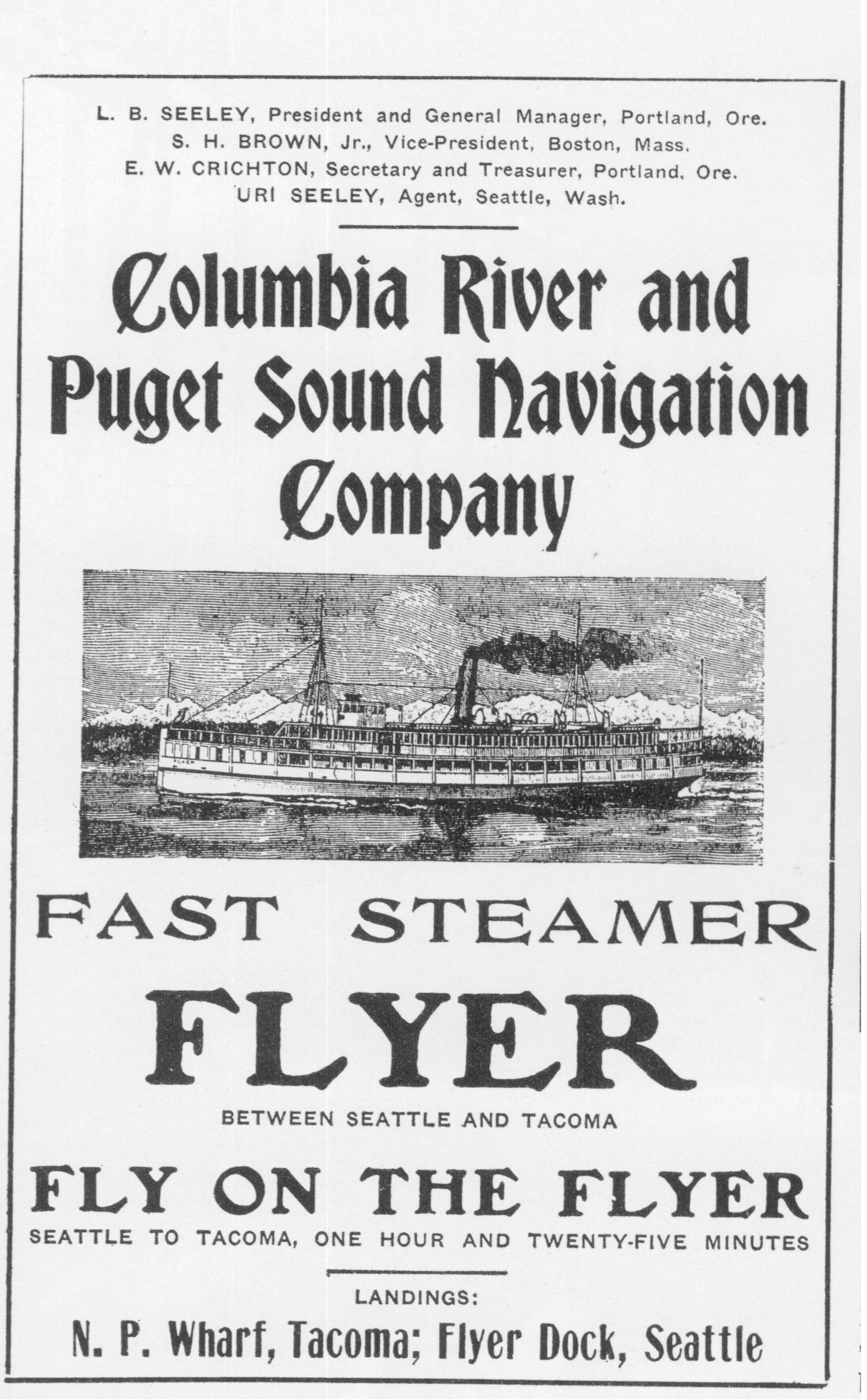
Advertisement for steamboat Flyer, published sometime between 1891 and 1911

In the past, the company operated an entire fleet of steamboats and ferries on Puget Sound in Washington and the Georgia Strait in British Columbia. Known colloquially as the Black Ball Line, the PSNC achieved a "virtual monopoly" on cross-sound traffic in the 1930s and competed with the Canadian Pacific Railway's steamships on several routes.

The company's trade name was inspired by the Black Ball Line which began scheduled passenger and freight service in 1818 with four sailing ships between New York and Liverpool. In 1884, the grandson of one of the founders, Charles Peabody, moved to Port Townsend Washington. Under modified Black Ball flag, he began the Alaska Steamship Company.

Before 1927, when the company was controlled by Joshua Green, the house flag consisted of a design by Mrs. Green, a red star on a white diamond on a blue background. After 1927, when Joshua Green sold his interest to the Peabody family, the Black Ball company flag was transferred over to Puget Sound Navigation Co., and the company became known as the Black Ball Line.

PSNC began to struggle following World War II, as operating costs increased. PSNC petitioned the State Utilities Commission for permission to raise its fares, but was rebuffed. Following a long series of court battles, PSNC's unionized employees finally called a strike. The company responded not by hiring strike breakers, but by halting operations, hoping public pressure would convince the State to permit a fare increase. The State declined to intervene, and PSNC eventually sold its domestic operations assets to the state of Washington's Department of Transportation for the sum of $4.9 million in early 1951, creating Washington State Ferries on May 31.

PSNC retained the assets used in their Canadian operations and, after the 1951 downsizing, operated a much-reduced fleet of five ships as Black Ball Ferries, Ltd. on routes between Vancouver and Nanaimo, and across Howe Sound and Jervis Inlet. The first all-Canadian route began on August 11, 1951 and was between Horseshoe Bay (in West Vancouver) and Gibsons Landing on BC's Sunshine Coast. In November 1961, this company sold most of its assets to BC Ferries, which had commenced operations in June 1960 as a division of the British Columbia Toll Highways and Bridges Authority, a Crown corporation of the British Columbia provincial government.

The current descendant of the Black Ball Line is Black Ball Ferry Line, which currently operates only one route across the Strait of Juan de Fuca, between Port Angeles and Victoria, using the MV Coho, built in 1959.

Originally Black Ball Line had a second service known as Black Ball Freight Service which was a subsidiary of the Puget Sound Navigation. It is unclear when the subsidiary was created. In 1936 R.J. Acheson purchased the subsidiary. In 1952, Acheson and his wife organized a new subsidiary of Black Ball Freight Service, naming it Black Ball Transport, Inc. By 2008 Black Ball Transport was renamed to its current name. Black Ball Freight Service ended in 2008.

== Acquisitions ==
=== Neah Bay Dock Company ===
The Neah Bay Dock Company was a subsidiary of the Puget Sound Navigation Company. In 1929 the Neah Bay Dock company owned a wharf and a hotel in Neah Bay, Washington.

== In popular culture ==
=== "The Black Ball Ferry Line" ===
In February 1951, Bing Crosby collaborated with The Andrews Sisters to record "The Black Ball Ferry Line", a song about the line's boats and routes throughout Puget Sound. The song mentions many of the Black Ball ferries by name, most of which became Washington State Ferries later that same year. The song is played over speakers on the Coho the beginning and end of each crossing.

== See also ==
- Pacific Wharf Company
