= Washington State Route 163 =

State highway in Washington, US

State Route 163
- Pearl Street
- SR 163 highlighted in red

Route information
- Auxiliary route of SR 16
- Maintained by WSDOT
- Length: 3.37 mi (5.42 km) Mileage does not include ferry route
- Existed: 1991 (current route)–present

Major junctions
- South end: SR 16 in Tacoma
- North end: Tahlequah ferry terminal in Vashon

Location
- Country: United States
- State: Washington
- Counties: Pierce, King

Highway system
- State highways in Washington; Interstate; US; State; Scenic; Pre-1964; 1964 renumbering; Former
← SR 162	→ SR 164

State Route 163 (SR 163) is a 3.37-mile-long (5.42 km) state highway in the U.S. state of Washington. The highway serves the city of Tacoma and the community of Ruston in Pierce County before traveling via a ferry route to the community of Tahlequah on Vashon Island in King County. SR 163 begins at an interchange with SR 16 in Tacoma and travels north as Pearl Street through Ruston to Point Defiance, where the designation continues onto the MV Chetzemoka ferry to Tahlequah.

SR 163 was established during the 1964 highway renumbering, extending from Sumner to Auburn. The highway was previously a part of the Pacific Highway during the early 20th century, but was designated as a branch of State Road 5 and Primary State Highway 5 (PSH 5) until 1964. SR 163 became SR 167 during the late 1960s and was moved to Pearl Street in 1991, with the ferry route being added in 1994.

== Route description ==
SR 163 begins as Pearl Street at a partial cloverleaf interchange with the SR 16 freeway in Tacoma north of Tacoma Community College. Pearl Street travels north, serving Silas High School and Truman Middle School, before leaving Tacoma and entering Ruston and serving Point Defiance Elementary School. The highway re-enters Tacoma at Point Defiance Park and passes the Science and Math Institute before traveling onto the Point Defiance–Tahlequah Ferry.

The ferry, operated by Washington State Ferries (WSF), is on a 1.7-mile-long (2.7 km) route and is served by the Kwa-di Tabil class MV Chetzemoka traveling at a speed of 15 knots (17 mph) for a 15-minute crossing. The ferries depart from Port Defiance and head north across the Dalco Passage to the community of Tahlequah on Vashon Island. WSF operates the ferry every day with 19 crossings, as a $5 toll for adult passengers is charged with prepaid Wave2Go cards being accepted.

Every year, the Washington State Department of Transportation (WSDOT) conducts a series of surveys on its highways in the state to measure traffic volume. This is expressed in terms of annual average daily traffic (AADT), which is a measure of traffic volume for any average day of the year. In 2011, WSDOT calculated that between 1,000 and 26,000 vehicles per day used the highway, mostly at the SR 16 interchange in Tacoma. The Point Defiance–Tahlequah ferry carried 650,000 passengers and 383,000 vehicles in 2012, according to WSF statistics.

== History ==
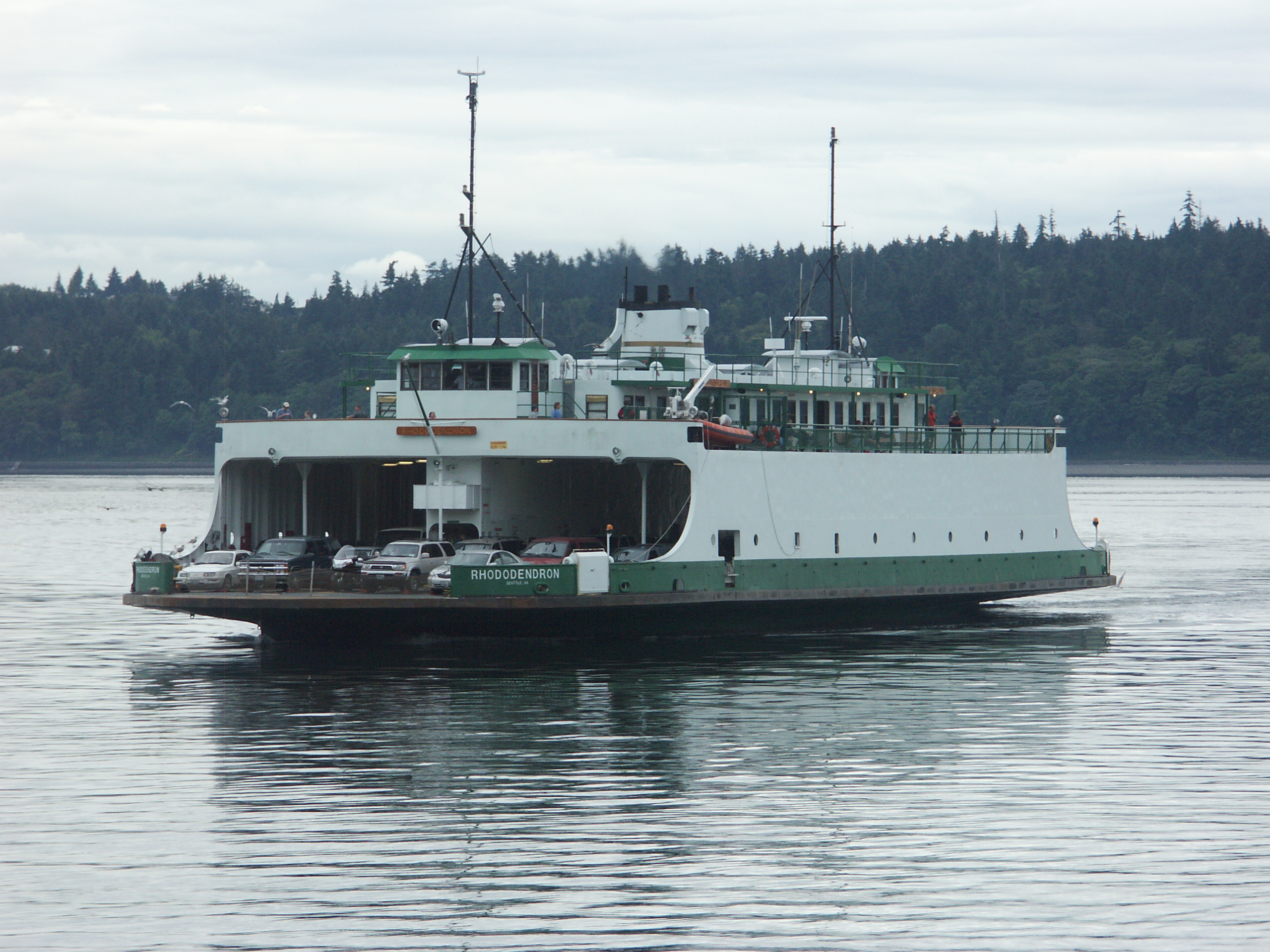
MV Rhododendron arriving at the Tahlequah ferry terminal in 2005.

SR 163 was first designated during the 1964 highway renumbering as a road extending from U.S. Route 410 in Sumner to SR 18 in Auburn. The corridor was previously a part of the Pacific Highway from 1913 to 1923, and later became a branch of State Road 5 in 1925. State Road 5 became PSH 5 during the creation of the Primary and secondary state highways in 1937, and the branch stayed designated. SR 163 was removed from the highway system in the late 1960s, and became part of SR 167.

SR 163 was re-designated in 1991 along Pearl Street from SR 16 in Tacoma to the Point Defiance ferry terminal. The route was extended onto the Point Defiance–Tahlequah Ferry serving Vashon Island in 1994. No major revisions have occurred since 1994 to the highway's route.

Regular ferry service on the Dalco Passage between Point Defiance in Tacoma and Tahlequah on Vashon Island started with the MV Skansonia in June 1951 during the creation of the WSF, and served the route until the completion of the MV Hiyu in 1967. The Hiyu operated for 26 years until it was replaced by the refurbished MV Rhododendron in 1993. The Hiyu briefly returned to the route twice, in June 2008 and in September and October 2008, while the Rhododendron was loaned out to Pierce County for the Steilacoom–Anderson Island ferry. The MV Chetzemoka, built in 2010, began serving the route in January 2012.

== Major intersections ==
County	Location	mi	km	Destinations	Notes
Pierce	Tacoma	0.00– 0.08	0.00– 0.13	SR 16 to I-5 – Bremerton, Seattle, Portland	Southern terminus; interchange
Pierce	Tacoma	3.37	5.42	Point Defiance ferry terminal	
Puget Sound		3.37– 5.40	5.42– 8.69	Point Defiance–Tahlequah Ferry	
King	Tahlequah	5.40	8.69	Tahlequah ferry terminal	Northern terminus
1.000 mi = 1.609 km; 1.000 km = 0.621 mi
