= MV Salish =

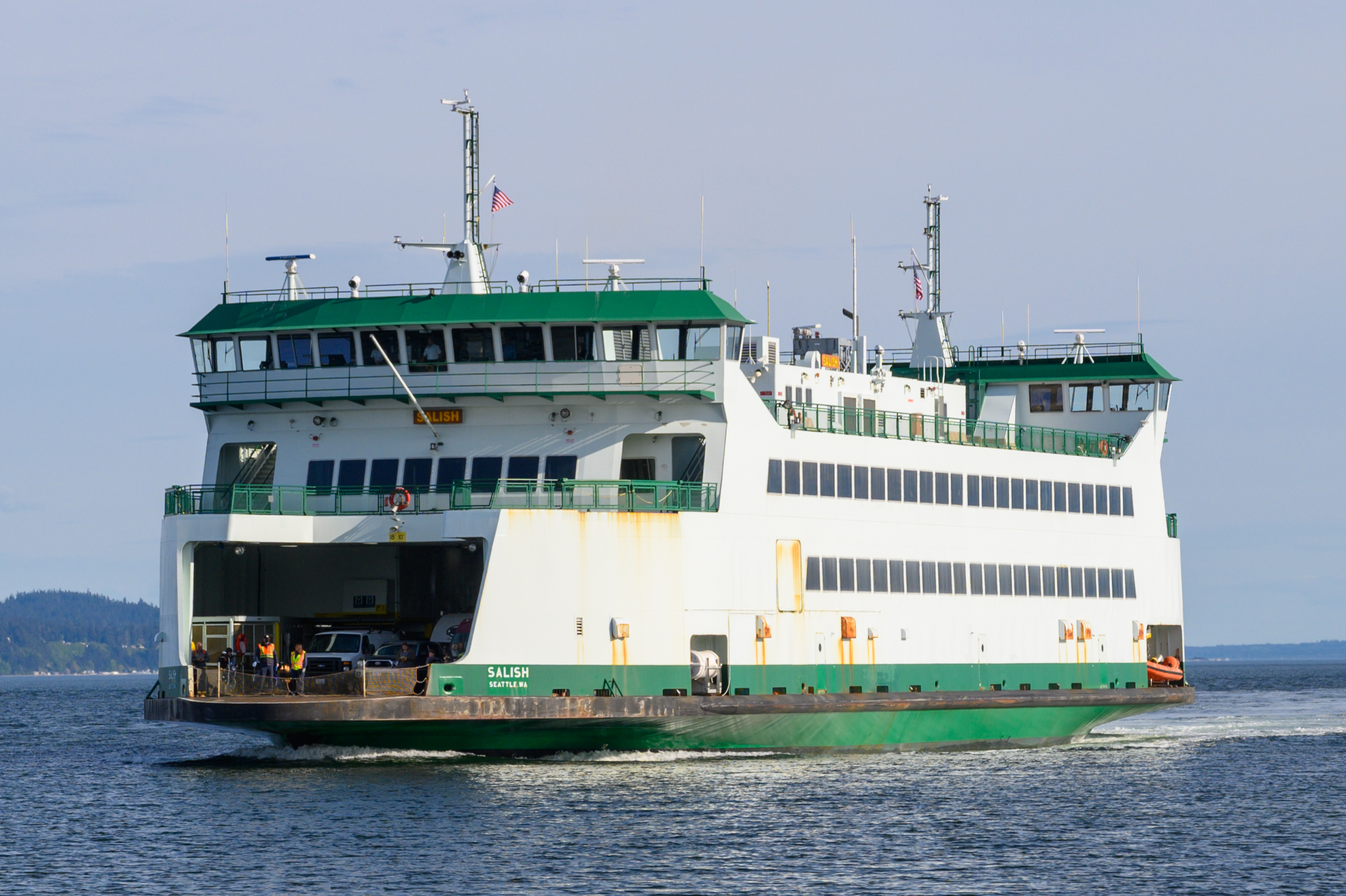
- MV Salish arriving at the Keystone/Coupeville terminal

History
- Name: Salish
- Owner: Washington State Ferries
- Operator: Washington State Ferries
- Route: Port Townsend-Coupeville (Keystone) (summer and shoulder season), relief vessel (winter)
- Builder: Todd Pacific Shipyards, Seattle
- Yard number: 100
- Launched: December 23, 2010
- Completed: May 12, 2011
- Maiden voyage: June 30, 2011
- In service: July 1, 2011
- Identification: IMO number: 9618329; MMSI number: 367480010; Callsign: WDF6992

General characteristics
- Class & type: Kwa-di Tabil-class auto/passenger ferry
- Length: 273 ft 8 in (83.4 m)
- Deck clearance: 15 ft 10 in (4.83 m)
- Propulsion: Diesel, Variable Pitch Propeller
- Capacity: 64 vehicles

MV Salish is a Kwa-di Tabil-class ferry built at Todd Pacific Shipyards in Seattle, Washington for the Washington State Ferries. The vessel was put into service on July 1, 2011 on the Port Townsend-Coupeville (Keystone, Whidbey Island) route.

The Salish serves on the Port Townsend-Coupeville run during the summer and summer-shoulder seasons. In the winter, late fall, and early spring, the Salish is a back-up vessel, coming into service as needed when other ferries undergo maintenance, usually on the Port Townsend-Coupeville or Point Defiance-Tahlequah runs.

== Design ==
The Salish's design is based on that of the MV Island Home ferry that is owned by The Woods Hole, Martha's Vineyard and Nantucket Steamship Authority. The particular class has had some mechanical issues, causing some in Washington to question the use of the design.

The Salish shares the design of its sister, the MV Chetzemoka. The design is somewhat unusual for a Washington State Ferry, as the vessel has two elevators, multiple stairwells, and a smoke stack on the same side of the ferry, instead of being symmetrical. This oddity in design, has given the vessels a pronounced 1 degree list, causing some to call the vessels "Eileen" (I lean). When the boat is loaded, the list is not noticeable.

This vessel was used as an emergency replacement vessel on the well traveled Bremerton-Seattle run, during this time it was observed the overpowered and diesel fuel-hungry engines couldn't make the 16-knot (30 km/h; 18 mph) speed they were designed for and could do at best 12.8 knots (23.7 km/h; 14.7 mph) (earning the nickname M/V slowish) resulting in major travel delays on top of the reduced capacity one would expect from this small vessel.

The Kwa-di Tabils are also the first "smaller scale" vessel to allow access to the "Texas Deck", the area on top of the vessel between pilot houses. Only the Super-class, Jumbo-class, and Jumbo Mark-II-class ferries allow such access. The Kwa-di Tabils are also the first vessel in the Washington State Ferries fleet to have a mezzanine deck, between the main passenger cabin and the car deck, which on one side is primarily configured to hold bicycles (instead of them being relegated to the car deck), and the other simply for passengers. These mezzanine decks are not connected, except via the main passenger cabin, allowing for 15 feet 10 inches (4.83 m) of clearance in the center of the vessel.
