= Kwa-di Tabil-class ferry =

Auto/passenger ferries operated by Washington State

Kwa-di Tabil class
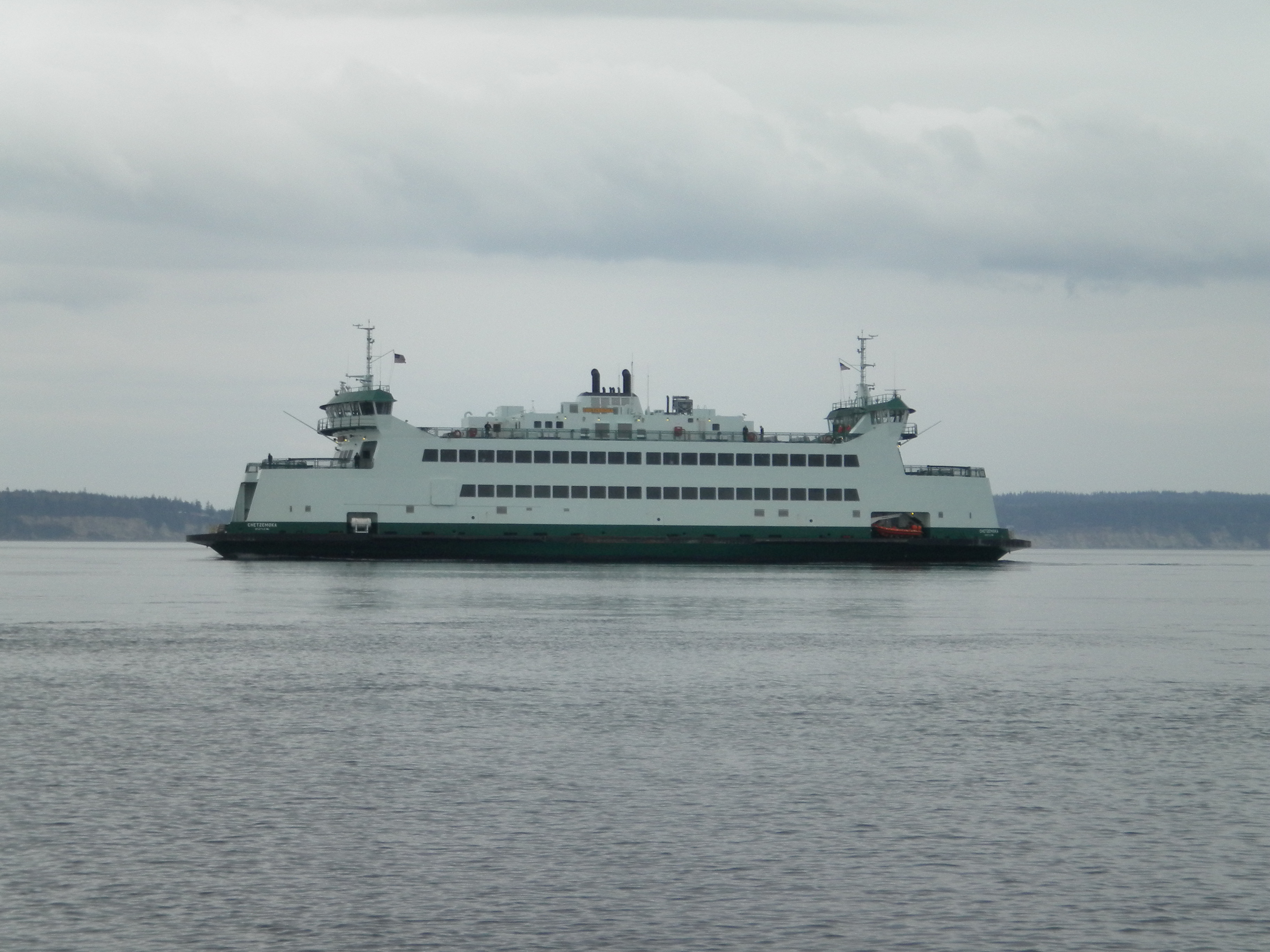
- MV Chetzemoka, the first of the class, sailing into Keystone Harbor (2011)

Class overview
- Builders: Todd Pacific Shipyards, Seattle, Washington
- Operators: Washington State Ferries
- Preceded by: Steel Electric class
- Built: 2009–2012
- In service: 2010–present
- Planned: 3
- Completed: 3
- Active: 3

General characteristics
- Type: Auto/passenger ferry
- Tonnage: 4,623
- Displacement: 1,515 long tons of displacement
- Length: 273 ft 8 in (83.41 m)
- Beam: 64 ft (20 m)
- Draft: 11 ft (3.4 m)
- Decks: 7
- Deck clearance: 16 ft 1 in (4.9 m) max
- Installed power: 6,000 hp (4,500 kW) total from two EMD 710 diesel engines
- Speed: 15 knots (28 km/h; 17 mph) max
- Capacity: 748 passengers; 64 vehicles (maximum)
- Crew: 10

Kwa-di Tabil-class ferries (kwah-DEE-tah-BALE) is a class of three ferries built for Washington State Ferries to replace the retired Steel Electric-class ferries. Acquired by the State of Washington at an approximate cost of $213 million, the vessels carry up to 64 vehicles on lower-traffic routes.

In the design stage, the class was called the 100 Vehicle-class and later 64 Vehicle-class ferries.

== Ferries ==
Ferries in this class include:

- MV Chetzemoka
- MV Salish
- MV Kennewick

== History ==
In November 2007, Washington State Ferries made the decision to remove the 80-year-old Steel Electric-class ferries from service over safety concerns. Routine inspections revealed serious hull corrosion damage on two of the four old vessels. When the Steel Electrics were removed from service, there were no ferries able to carry vehicles on Port Townsend-Coupeville route as no other vessel could be used in Coupeville's small, shallow Keystone Harbor.

Due to the vessel shortage created by the sudden retirement of the Steel Electric-class ferries, Washington State Ferries (WSF) decided to base the design of the Kwa-di Tabil-class ferries on an existing ferry, Island Home, which runs between Martha's Vineyard, Massachusetts and Woods Hole, Massachusetts. The Washington State Legislature authorized and funded vessel construction in February 2008 and the first vessel was built on tight 18-month schedule by Todd Pacific Shipyards in Seattle (by state law all new WSF vessels are built in Washington). The "build in Washington" restriction was removed by the legislature in 2023.

The first ferry, Chetzemoka, was christened by Governor Christine Gregoire and began service November 14, 2010 on the Port Townsend-Coupeville route. Two boat service returned to the route on July 1, 2011 with the delivery of the second ferry, Salish. Kennewick entered service on February 14, 2012 and was assigned to the Port Townsend-Coupeville route, allowing Chetzemoka to be reassigned to the Point Defiance–Tahlequah route and the 65-year-old ferry Rhododendron to be retired.

== Issues ==
The Kwa-di Tabil-class ferries have had a number of problems since they were delivered. Most seriously, the non-symmetrical design of the ships caused them to list noticeably to one side. After a few months in service, ballast was added to one side of the vessels to correct the list. An unexpected side-benefit to correcting the list was a 14 percent improvement in fuel efficiency.

Despite promises that the Kwa-di Tabil-class ferries were designed to serve all routes and terminals in the WSF system, they have proven to be ill-suited for many routes. The narrow car decks on the ferries make it difficult to turn vehicles around (necessary on the inter-island route in the San Juan Islands and on the Fauntleroy / Vashon / Southworth route). During a December 2012 and January 2013 fleet emergency, Salish was pressed into service on the well-traveled Bremerton-Seattle run. It was at that time that it was discovered that the diesel fuel-hungry engines on the Kwa-di Tabil-class ferries struggled to make the 15.5 knots (28.7 km/h; 17.8 mph) speed for which they had been designed, and Salish averaged at best 13 knots (24 km/h; 15 mph).
