= MV Hiyu =

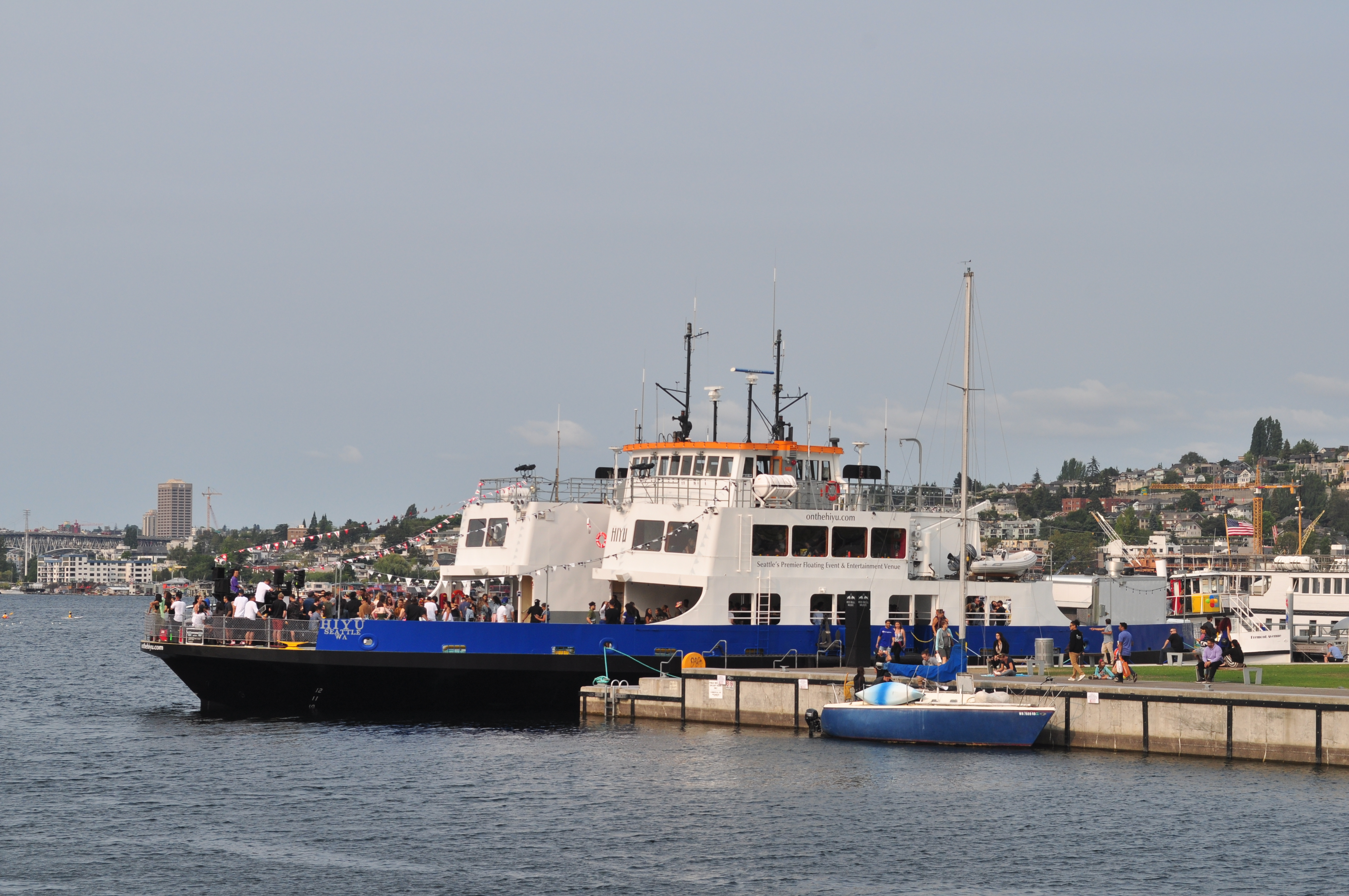
- MV Hiyu as a party boat, 2018

History
- Name: Hiyu
- Owner: WSDOT
- Operator: Washington State Ferries
- Port of registry: Seattle, Washington, US
- Builder: Gunderson Brothers, Portland, Oregon
- Cost: $750,000 (1967)
- Completed: 1967
- In service: mid 1967
- Out of service: May 17, 2016
- Identification: IMO number: 8645301; MMSI number: 366772770; Callsign: WX9133; Official Number: 508159
- Status: Retired

General characteristics
- Class & type: Hiyu-class auto/passenger ferry
- Length: 162 ft (49.4 m)
- Beam: 63 ft 1 in (19.2 m)
- Draft: 11 ft 3 in (3.4 m)
- Deck clearance: 15 ft (4.6 m)
- Installed power: Total 860 hp from 2 diesel engines
- Speed: 10 kn (19 km/h)
- Capacity: 200 passengers; 34 vehicles (max 12 commercial)

MV Hiyu was a ferry operated by Washington State Ferries. Originally built in 1967 to replace an earlier ferry, it was used on the Point Defiance–Tahlequah route during its early years. Upon its retirement in 2016, it was the smallest ferry in the fleet, with a capacity of 34 cars and 200 passengers, and a length of 162 feet (49 m). MV Hiyu is now used as a sailing entertainment venue as of 2026, hosting concerts. The vessel's name is Chinook Jargon for "plenty."

== History ==
The Hiyu was originally built in 1967 by Gunderson Brothers in Portland, Oregon to replace the aging wooden ferry MV Skansonia on the Point Defiance–Tahlequah ferry, which had a capacity of 32 cars at the time and a clearance of 11 feet (3.4 m) on her car deck. The Hiyu was slightly bigger and faster than her predecessor, but most importantly, she had a higher clearance in her two center lanes, allowing trucks to reach Vashon Island without having to drive to Fauntleroy.

The Hiyu worked the short route between Vashon Island and Tacoma until the late-1980s. By then, she could no longer handle the increased traffic on the route and was replaced with the 55-car MV Olympic.

Washington State Ferries reassigned her to the San Juan Islands, where she served as the inter-island boat with stops on San Juan Island, Orcas Island, Shaw Island, and Lopez Island. By the late 1990s, the Hiyu's small size became an issue once again on the San Juan inter-island route, and she was replaced by a larger vessel, the MV Nisqually.

She was mothballed for over 10 years at Washington State Ferries' maintenance facility in Eagle Harbor. During that period, she was mainly used as a WSF training vessel. She was also used for filming some movies and television commercials, including a commercial for the Seattle Seahawks football team in 1999. Occasionally, she was contracted out for service on the Steilacoom-Anderson Island ferry route when the MV Christine Anderson needed emergency repairs.

During this time, WSF considered selling this ferry. The Washington State Department of Corrections was interested in using her for service to their prison on McNeil Island. There were also plans to sell her to Whatcom County for them to use at Lummi Island or for ferry service between Blaine and Point Roberts. In the end, nothing came of the plans to sell the Hiyu.

In June 2007, Washington State Ferries put the Hiyu back in service once again between Point Defiance and Tahlequah when the MV Rhododendron encountered rudder problems. At the time, Hiyu was the only other ferry available to cover for the Rhody.

On November 20, 2007, the four Steel Electric-class ferries were removed from service, leaving Hiyu as the only back-up ferry in the fleet. She continued to serve as a back-up ferry, but couldn't provide enough capacity on any of WSF's routes. She also couldn't be made ADA-accessible. In the governor's proposed budget for 2009, the Hiyu was slated to be permanently assigned to the Point Defiance-Tahlequah route to allow for the Rhododendron's retirement. The legislature did not approve this proposal, so the Rhododendron remained in service until 2012, when the 64-car MV Chetzemoka replaced her.

The Hiyu proved useful in December 2012 when three ferries, the Walla Walla, Sealth and Klahowya, were taken out of service and the Hiyu was put on the Vashon-Southworth-Fauntleroy run for six days while repairs were made.

On November 25, 2013, the local TV station KING 5 reported that, since January 2012, WSF had spent $710,000 keeping engineers on the boat almost every day, but that it was only in service for eight days during that time. The head of WSF, David Moseley, said that the expense was minimal, amounting to less than one percent of the total cost of labor for engineers. At the time, WSF was building two new 144-car Olympic-class ferries which entered service in 2014 and 2015. One of them was to allow WSF to have a more adequate backup ferry.

After a year without service, the Hiyu was put back to work in January 2014 on the San Juan Interisland route to cover for the Evergreen State, which had broken down. The Hiyu was in service during two days until the regular ferry was repaired. On July 23, 2015, the Hiyu was put in service for the last time, sailing on the Fauntleroy-Vashon-Southworth route, which was otherwise running on a 2-boat schedule due to vessel moves elsewhere in the WSF system, which were made to accommodate emergency repairs to the MV Puyallup and MV Elwha while maintaining reasonable service throughout the WSF system. On May 17, 2016, WSDOT announced that the Hiyu had been officially retired and that it would soon be put up for sale. In October 2016, the state government's surplus operations ran an auction for Hiyu, ending with no sale. A second auction for the vessel later in the year also failed to find a buyer, but in February 2017 the state reached an agreement to sell Hiyu to a private buyer who would use her as a floating entertainment venue on Lake Union.
