= Point Defiance–Tahlequah ferry =

Ferry route in the U.S. state of Washington

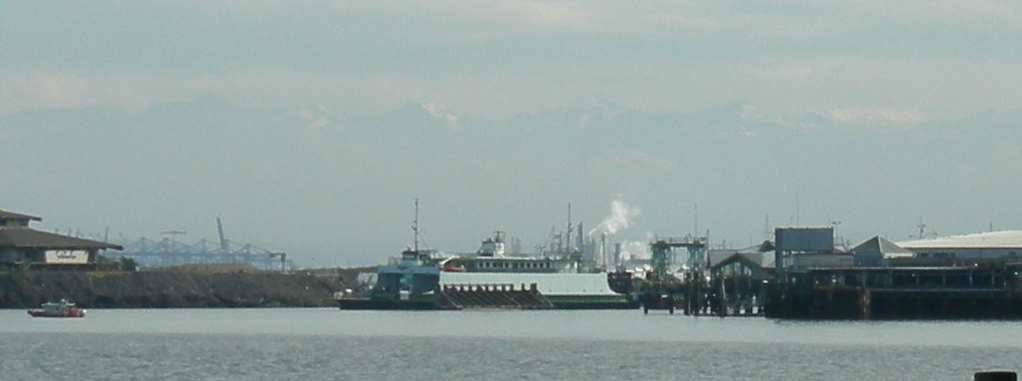
- Point Defiance ferry terminal
- Waterway: Dalco Passage (Puget Sound)
- Route: Point Defiance–Tahlequah, Washington
- Authority: Washington State Ferries (1951–present)
- Travel time: 15 minutes (2011)
- Connections at Tacoma
- Bus: Pierce Transit
- Road: SR 163
- Connections at Vashon Island
- Bus: King County Metro

The Point Defiance–Tahlequah ferry is a ferry route across Puget Sound between the Point Defiance ferry terminal in Tacoma and Tahlequah, Washington, on the southern tip of Vashon Island. Since 1951 the only ferries employed on the route have belonged to the Washington state ferry system, currently the largest ferry system in the United States. Point Defiance-Tahlequah is the shortest route in the system.

== Description ==
This ferry route is 1.7 miles long, with terminals at Point Defiance Park in Tacoma and on Vashon Island, at Tahlequah.

== Vessels ==
Until 1967, the wooden ferry Skansonia (capacity: 308 passengers, 32 autos) was regularly assigned to the route. In 1967, Skansonia, built in 1929, was replaced with Hiyu (capacity: 200 passengers, 40 autos), which had been built specifically for the route. However, traffic soon outpaced the Hiyu, which was replaced by the Olympic and later the 48-car ferry MV Rhododendron. Since 2012, MV Chetzemoka has served the route.

== See also ==
- Washington State Ferries
- Ferries in Washington State
