= Ruston, Washington =

City in Washington, United States

- Town
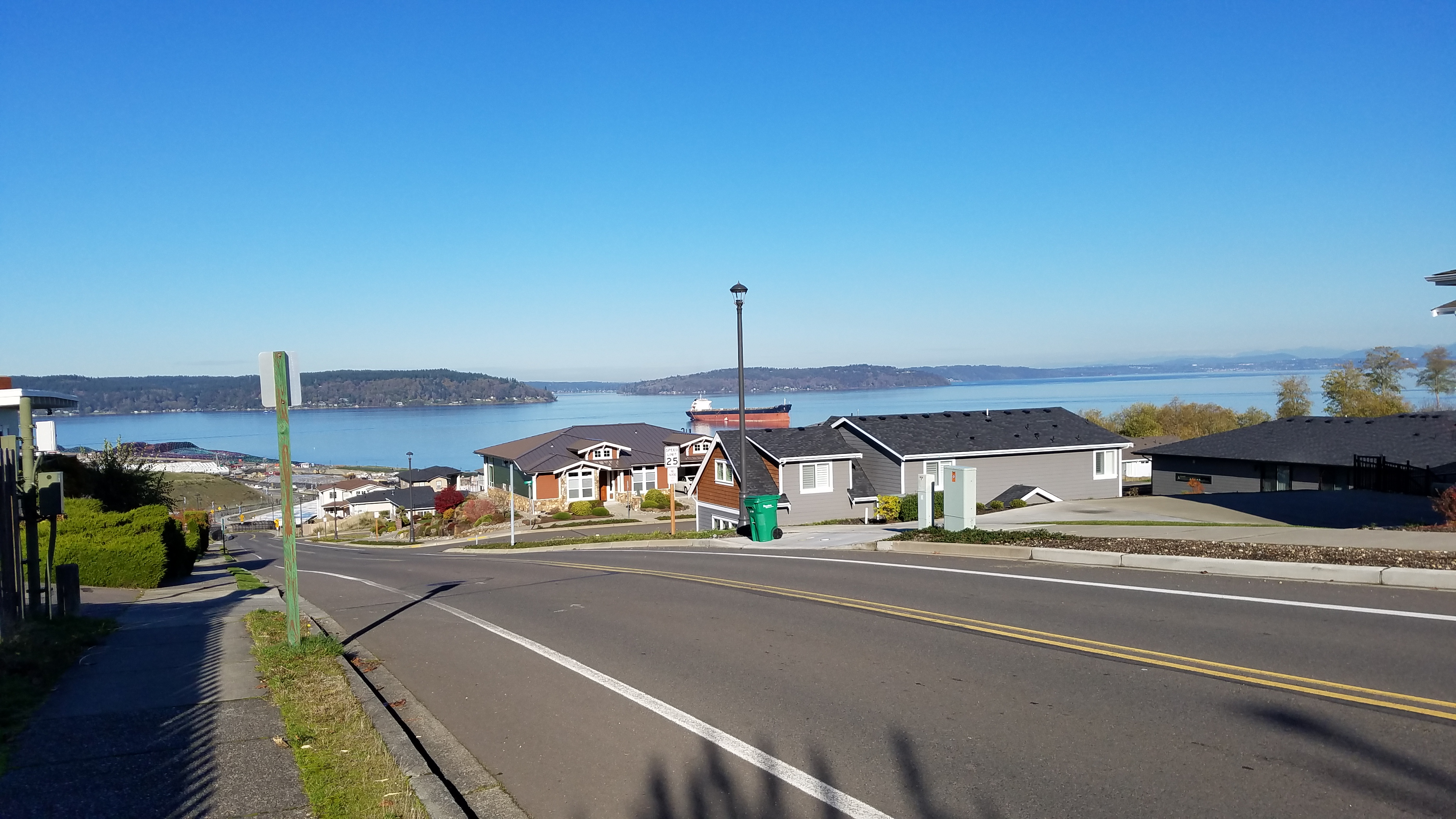
- Neighborhoods at Stack Hill

- Location of Ruston, Washington
- Coordinates: 47°17′53″N 122°30′37″W
- Country: United States
- State: Washington
- County: Pierce

Government
  - Type: Mayor-Council
  - Mayor: Bruce Hopkins

Area
  - Total: 0.26 sq mi (0.67 km^{2})
  - Land: 0.25 sq mi (0.66 km^{2})
  - Water: 0.0039 sq mi (0.01 km^{2})
- Elevation: 98 ft (30 m)

Population (2020)
  - Total: 1,055
  - Density: 3,306/sq mi (1,276.6/km^{2})
- Time zone: UTC-8 (Pacific (PST))
  - Summer (DST): UTC-7 (PDT)
- ZIP code: 98407
- Area code: 253
- FIPS code: 53-60510
- GNIS feature ID: 2412586
- Website: rustonwa.org

Ruston is a city in Pierce County, Washington, United States. The population was 1,055 at the 2020 census.

Although it is nearly indistinguishable from the adjacent city of Tacoma, the predominantly residential area still retains its status as a separate municipality long after it ceased to be a company town. The local government opted to reclassify Ruston as a city in late 2012.

== History ==
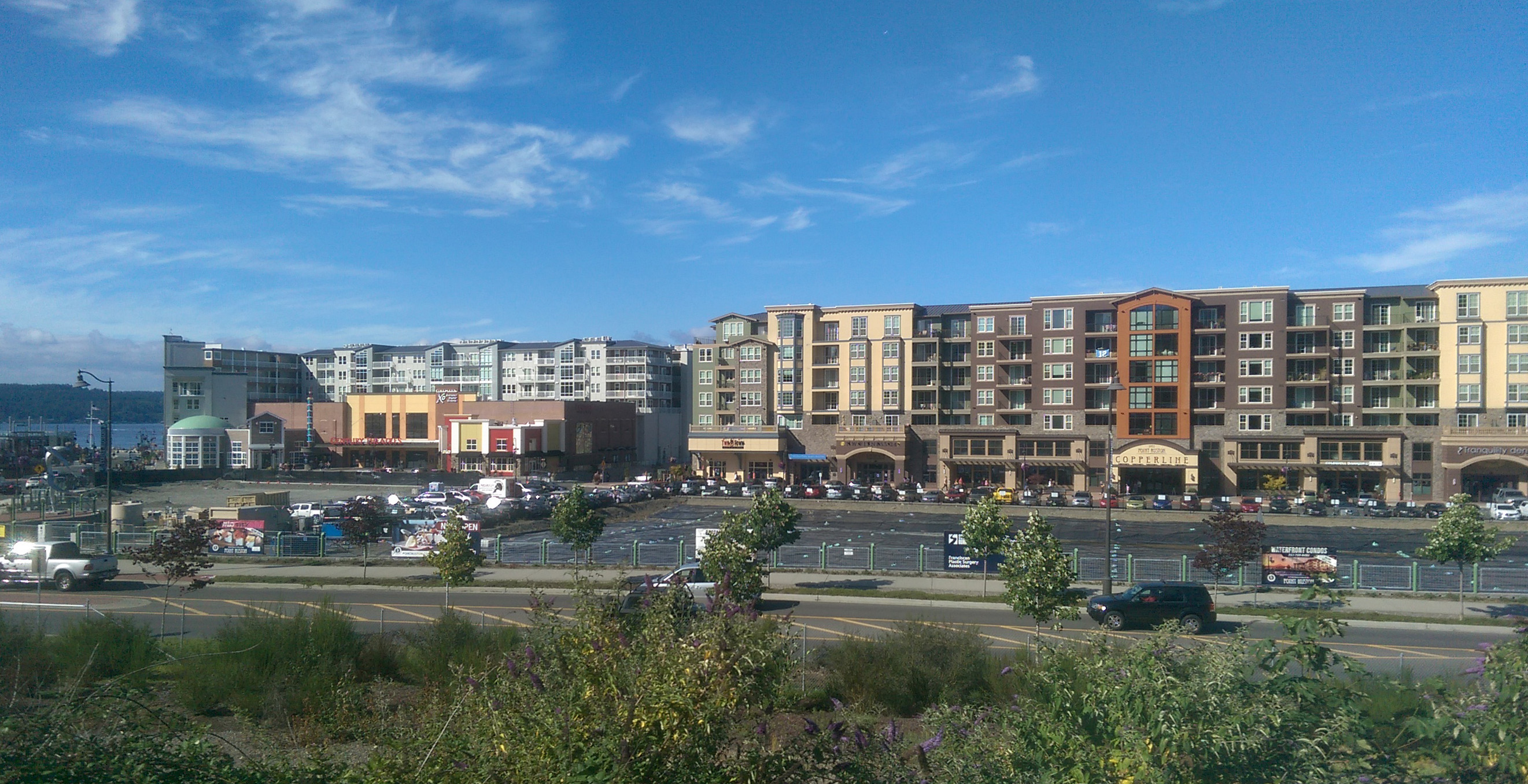
Mixed-use buildings at Point Ruston, on the former site of a smelter

In 1890, industrialist William R. Rust established Tacoma Smelting & Refining Company and a company town named the "Smelter District". The company took over an existing smelter that had opened two years earlier and began refining lead; it expanded to more than 300 employees by 1905, with most living in the Smelter District. In 1906, Rust proposed the creation of a new city, which residents named "Ruston" in his honor. Ruston was officially incorporated as a city on November 10, 1906, surrounded on one side by Commencement Bay and all other sides the city of Tacoma.

The Tacoma Smelting & Refining Company was acquired by the American Smelting and Refining Company (ASARCO) in 1905 and its Ruston facility was converted for copper smelting. A prominent brick smokestack was constructed in 1917 and originally measured 571 feet (174 m) in height and was the tallest in the world until it was reduced to 562 feet (171 m) following earthquake damage in 1937. The facility's waste slag was dumped into Commencement Bay for land expansion, while the smokestack produced plumes that polluted portions of Pierce County. The smelter closed in 1985 due to a decline in copper prices and new regulations on arsenic pollution; the facility employed 700 people at the time. The smokestack was demolished on January 17, 1993, amid a major environmental cleanup under the Superfund program.

The Superfund cleanup extended to most of the town and required the removal of contaminated soil in and around properties. By 2006, cleanup was largely complete and median home prices had doubled over a three-year period as Ruston became a desirable bedroom community. The Ruston town council passed a measure to become a noncharter code city under Washington law in late 2012. Officials indicated that the "Town of Ruston" moniker would continue to be used. Development of residential and commercial buildings on the 97-acre (39 ha) smelter site, renamed "Point Ruston", began in 2013 and the first phase opened the following year. The area, described as an urban village, also includes waterfront parkspace and a multi-use path that connects to Point Defiance Park. The full development of Point Ruston is planned to include 1,200 residential units, a waterfront hotel, and various commercial spaces. The development's properties were later placed in receivership due to failed payments to a lender by the new owners of various phases.

== Geography ==
Ruston is surrounded on three sides by the city of Tacoma; to the north is Puget Sound.

According to the United States Census Bureau, the town has a total area of 0.34 square miles (0.88 km^{2}), of which, 0.26 square miles (0.67 km^{2}) is land and 0.08 square miles (0.21 km^{2}) is water.

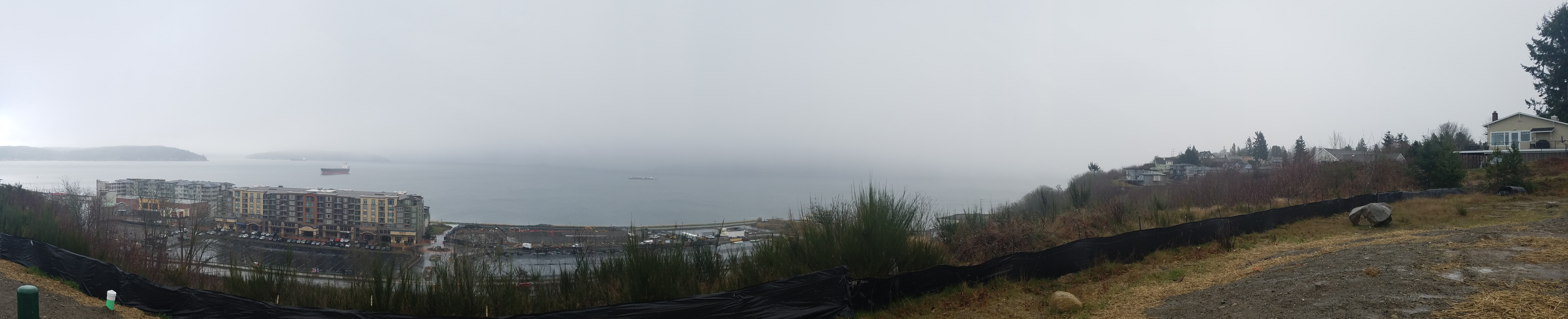
Panorama from above Point Ruston, overlooking the Puget Sound.

== Demographics ==
Historical population
Census	Pop.	Note	%±
1910	780		—
1920	1,128		44.6%
1930	818		−27.5%
1940	739		−9.7%
1950	838		13.4%
1960	694		−17.2%
1970	668		−3.7%
1980	612		−8.4%
1990	693		13.2%
2000	738		6.5%
2010	749		1.5%
2020	1,055		40.9%
U.S. Decennial Census; 2020 Census

=== 2010 census ===
As of the 2010 census, there were 749 people, 336 households, and 194 families living in the town. The population density was 2,880.8 inhabitants per square mile (1,112.3/km^{2}). There were 430 housing units at an average density of 1,653.8 per square mile (638.5/km^{2}). The racial makeup of the town was 87.0% White, 2.9% African American, 1.1% Native American, 2.7% Asian, 0.7% Pacific Islander, 0.9% from other races, and 4.7% from two or more races. Hispanic or Latino of any race were 6.0% of the population.

There were 336 households, of which 28.0% had children under the age of 18 living with them, 43.8% were married couples living together, 9.2% had a female householder with no husband present, 4.8% had a male householder with no wife present, and 42.3% were non-families. 30.1% of all households were made up of individuals, and 6.6% had someone living alone who was 65 years of age or older. The average household size was 2.23 and the average family size was 2.78.

The median age in the town was 39.5 years. 20.8% of residents were under the age of 18; 6.8% were between the ages of 18 and 24; 30.6% were from 25 to 44; 31.7% were from 45 to 64; and 10% were 65 years of age or older. The gender makeup of the town was 48.7% male and 51.3% female.

=== 2000 census ===
As of the 2000 census, there were 738 people, 330 households, and 185 families living in the town. The population density was 2,879.9 people per square mile (1,095.9/km^{2}). There were 355 housing units at an average density of 1,385.3 per square mile (527.2/km^{2}). The racial makeup of the town was 87.26% White, 2.57% African American, 2.98% Native American, 2.30% Asian, 0.14% Pacific Islander, 1.08% from other races, and 3.66% from two or more races. Hispanic or Latino of any race were 3.79% of the population.

There were 330 households, out of which 22.7% had children under the age of 18 living with them, 41.8% were married couples living together, 9.4% had a female householder with no husband present, and 43.9% were non-families. 34.2% of all households were made up of individuals, and 8.5% had someone living alone who was 65 years of age or older. The average household size was 2.24 and the average family size was 2.87.

In the town the age distribution of the population shows 20.1% under the age of 18, 8.7% from 18 to 24, 33.5% from 25 to 44, 27.1% from 45 to 64, and 10.7% who were 65 years of age or older. The median age was 39 years. For every 100 females, there were 106.7 males. For every 100 females age 18 and over, there were 108.5 males.

The median income for a household in the town was $48,393, and the median income for a family was $54,167. Males had a median income of $36,932 versus $36,042 for females. The per capita income for the town was $22,565. About 7.7% of families and 13.1% of the population were below the poverty line, including 12.8% of those under age 18 and 5.1% of those age 65 or over.

== Education ==
Ruston is served by Tacoma Public Schools, a public school district. Most of Ruston is zoned to Point Defiance Elementary School while parts in the east are zoned to Sherman Elementary School. All of Ruston is zoned to Truman Middle School and Silas High School (formerly Woodrow Wilson High School).

The magnet school Science and Math Institute (SAMi) is at Point Defiance Park, adjacent to Ruston. The school opened at the park in 2009 and moved to a new campus in 2015.
