= James G. Swan =

American Indian agent

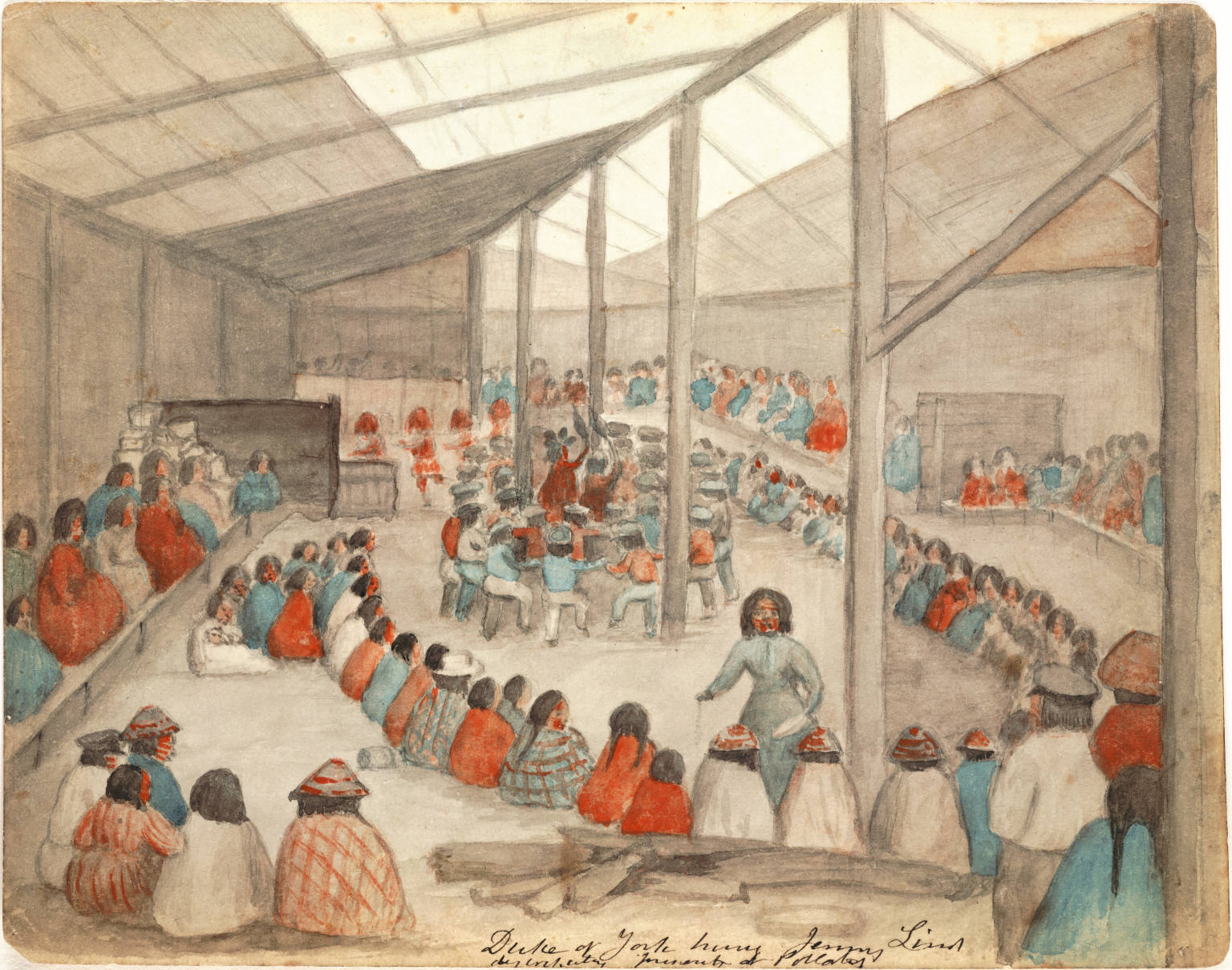
Watercolor by Swan depicting the Klallam people of Port Townsend, with one of chief Chetzemoka's wives distributing potlatch.

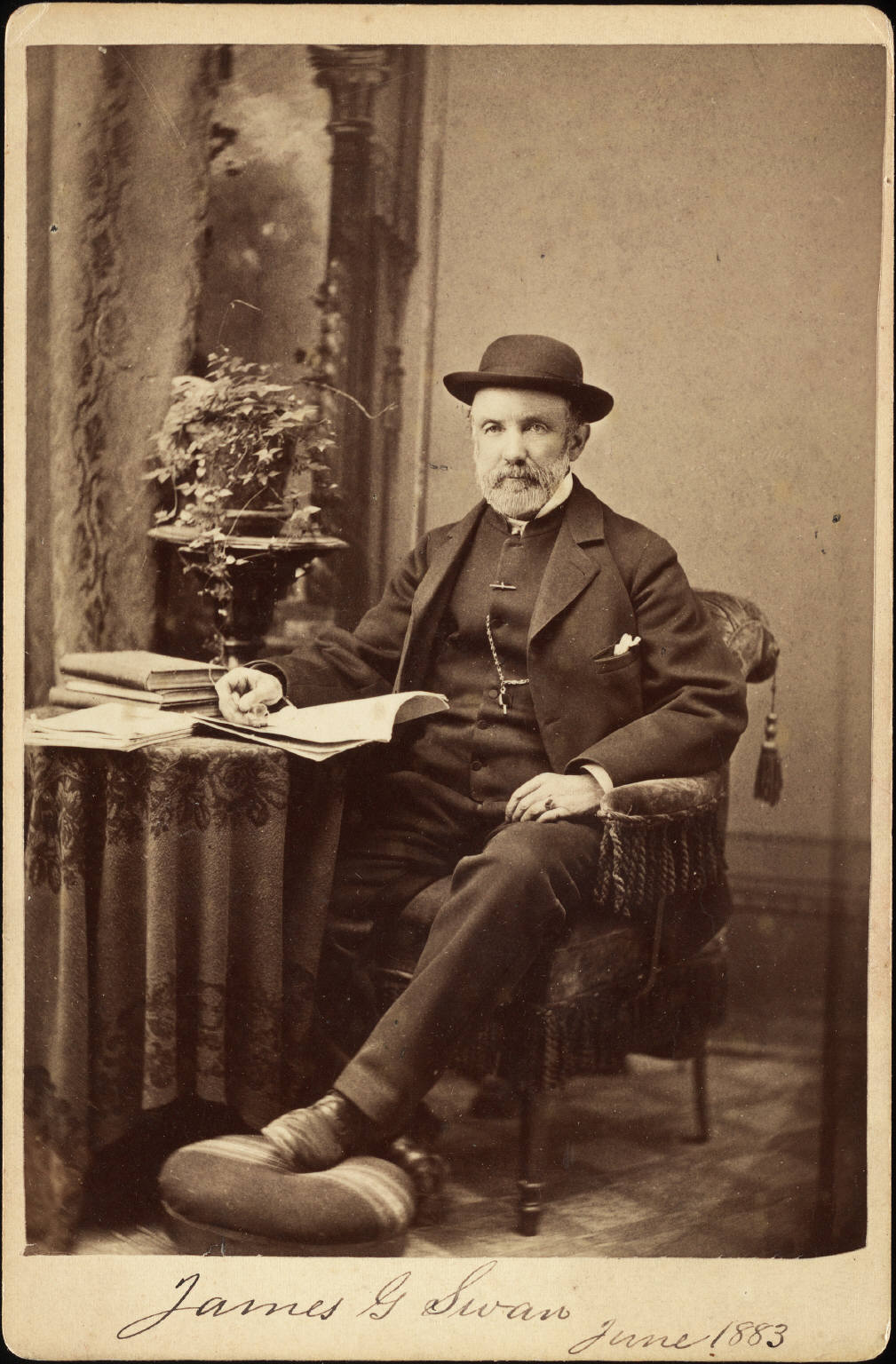
Portrait of James G. Swan, 1883

James Gilchrist Swan (January 11, 1818 – May 18, 1900) was an American Indian agent in what is now the U.S. state of Washington, who was known as an authority on the indigenous peoples of the Pacific Northwest Coast, an Indian artifact collector on behalf of the Smithsonian Institution, and for writing the first ethnography of the Makah tribal group, among whom he lived.

He began collecting Haida artefacts in or around the 1870s, though he first visited Haida Gwaii in 1883, as an assistant and collector for the Fish Commission.

== Sources ==
- Doig, Ivan (1980) Winter Brothers: A Season at the Edge of America. New York: Harcourt Brace Jovanovich.
- McDonald, Lucile (1972) Swan among the Indians: Life of James G. Swan, 1818–1900. Portland, Oregon: Binfords and Mort.

== Writings ==
- Swan, James Gilchrist (1870). The Indians of Cape Flattery : at the entrance to the Strait of Fuca, Washington Territory (DJVU). Smithsonian Institution. OCLC 3602788.
- Swan, James Gilchrist (1857). The Northwest coast, or, Three years' residence in Washington Territory (DJVU). Harper. OCLC 55630405.
