= Camp 6 Logging Museum =

Coordinates: 47.3033°N 122.5277°W

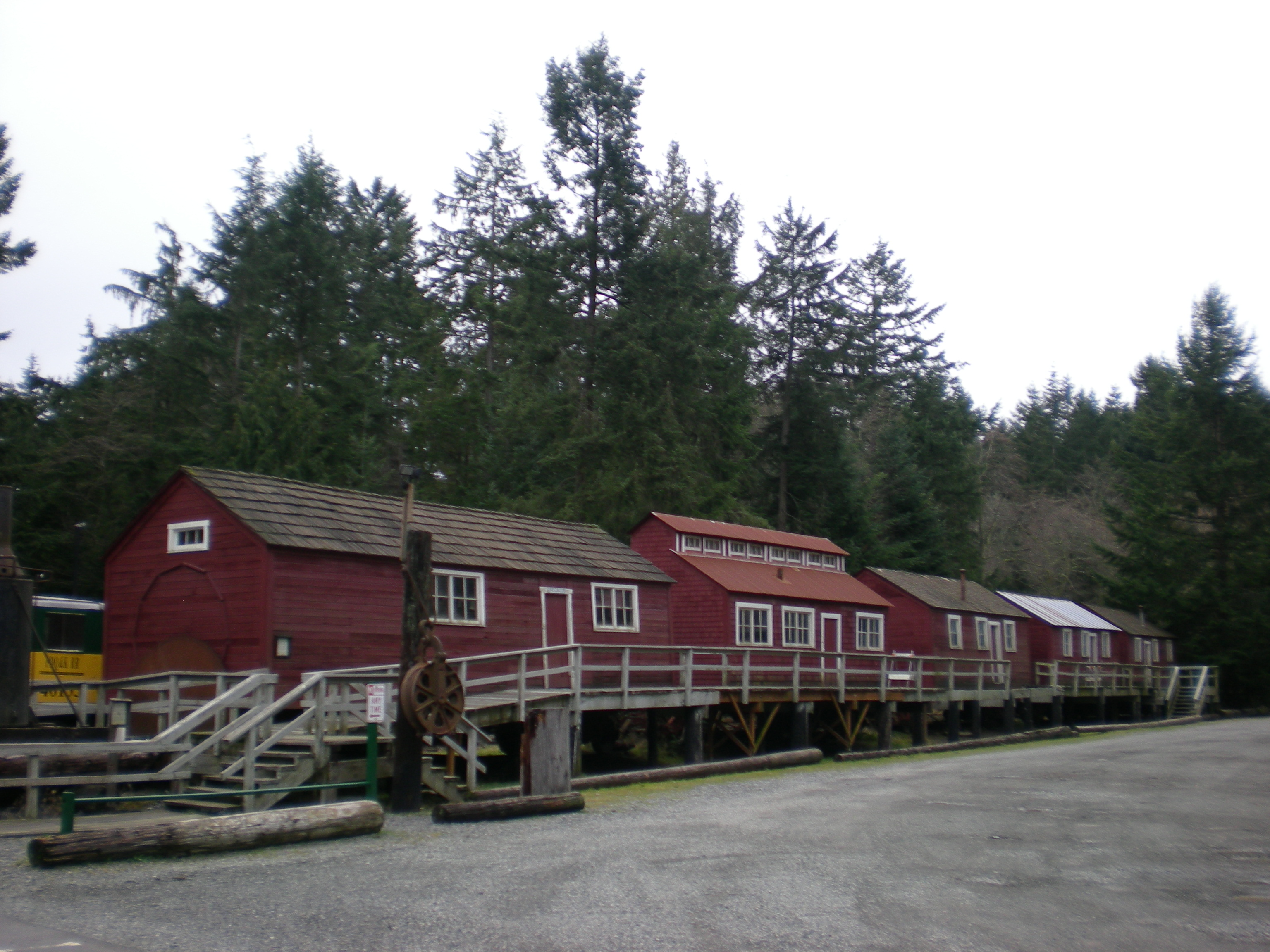
Camp 6 Logging Museum

Camp 6 Logging Museum was located on a 14-acre (57,000 m^{2}) forested site inside Point Defiance Park in Tacoma, Washington. Established in 1964 as the Camp Six Logging Exhibit by Western Forest Industries Museum, Inc by members of the Logging Industry in Washington State. Designed by logging engineers, Camp 6 included a replica of an operating railroad connecting the working sites with the bunk houses and bunk cars of the camp.

The museum was a National Registered Historic Place, and featured several historic buildings and over 500 tons railroad and logging equipment. Many pieces of equipment were powered by steam.

== Background ==
The museum was last operated by the Tacoma Chapter of the National Railway Historical Society from 1989 to 2010, staffed by volunteers, and funded by individual and corporate donations. Camp 6 was closed December 2010 when Public and Private funding ran out and forced the closing. All of the equipment was removed to other Museums in Washington, Oregon and California during 2011 and 2012. Some of the Major Equipment relocations: Pacific Coast Shay Lima # 3346 (KL&L No.7) & Weyerhaeuser No.3 Lidgerwood Tower Skidder moved to Roots of Motive Power Museum, Willits, CA. Some of the Bunk Houses and Bunk Cars moved to The Mt Rainier Scenic Railroad's Mineral Lake Shop Complex at Mineral, Washington. Other Equipment and the Rayioneer Photo Collection were passed on to the Polson Museum in Hoquiam, Washington. The "Don Olson Art Collection" was placed with the Weyerhaeuser Company Art Collection, Federal Way, Washington.

After extensive site clean-up the property was returned September 2012 to Metro Parks Tacoma. The site is currently being used as the temporary home during the 2015-2016 school year of Tacoma School District's Science And Math Institute (SAMI), a Washington State Designated Innovative High School. SAMI offers students an innovative and rigorous education that is focused on science and math. The curriculum is integrated; courses are advanced and often mixed age. The school uses its unique setting – Point Defiance Park – to enhance the learning experience.

The Metro Parks Board Of Directors still need to decide the future of the site after SAMI moves into more permanent quarters within Point Defiance Park. As of 2023 SAMI has a building near we're camp six used to be and near the zoo known as the ELC

== See also ==
- Logging camp
