= MV Kennewick =

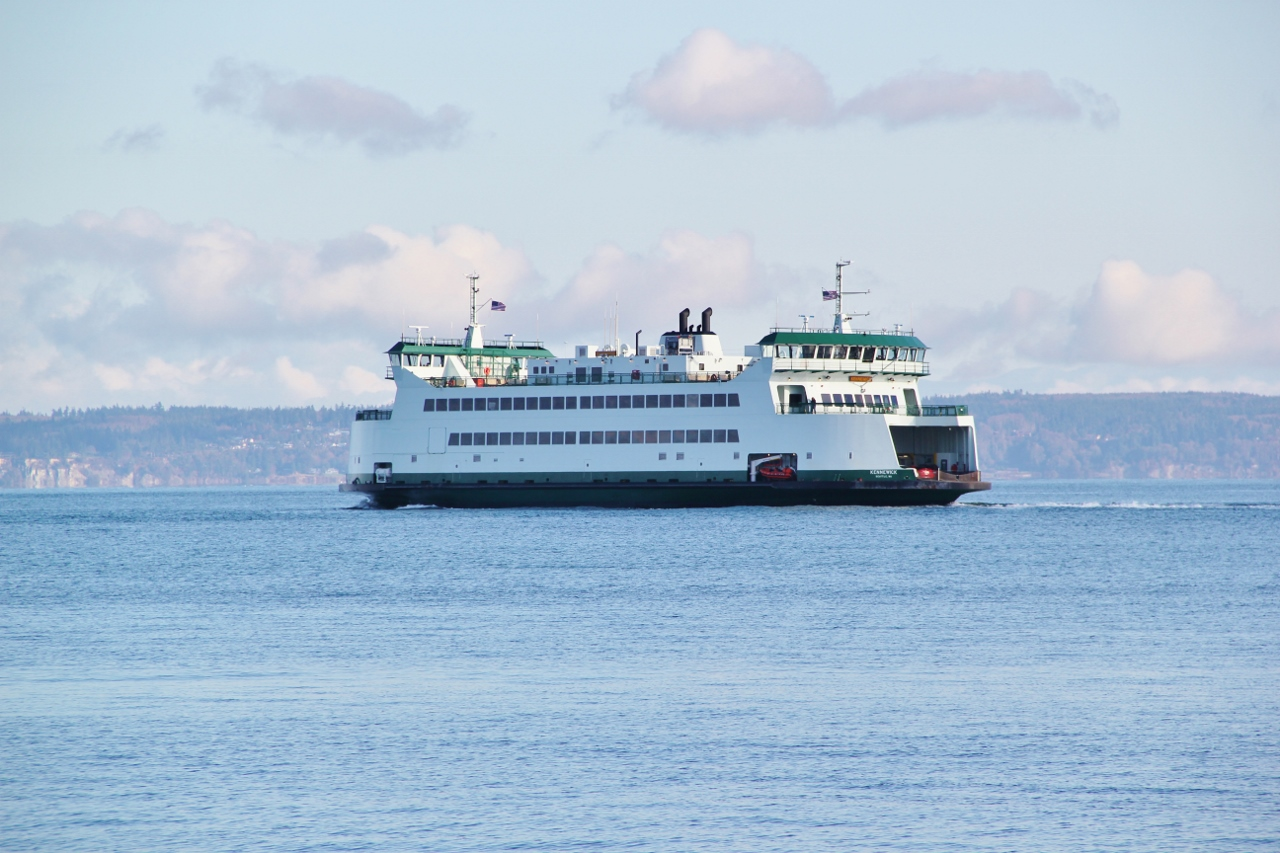
- MV Kennewick

History
- Name: Kennewick
- Owner: Washington State Ferries
- Operator: Washington State Ferries
- Builder: Vigor Shipyards (formerly Todd Pacific Shipyards)
- Launched: May 17, 2011
- In service: February 14, 2012
- Identification: IMO number: 9618331; MMSI number: 367479990; Callsign: WDF6991

General characteristics
- Class & type: Kwa-di Tabil-class auto/passenger ferry
- Length: 273 ft 8 in (83.4 m)
- Beam: 64 ft (20 m)
- Draft: 11 ft (3.4 m)
- Capacity: 64 vehicles, 750 passengers

MV Kennewick is a Kwa-di Tabil-class ferry operated by Washington State Ferries. She entered service on the Port Townsend–Coupeville ferry route on February 14, 2012.

== Characteristics ==
Kennewick measures 273 feet 8 inches (83.4 m) in length, has a beam of 64 feet (20 m), a draft of 11 feet (3.4 m) and a displacement of 2,050 tons. She has a capacity of 64 vehicles and 750 passengers, and has a crew of eight.

== History ==
The name Kennewick was chosen on July 13, 2010, after being suggested by Michael Fox, a resident of Washington's Bainbridge Island. The ship is named after the mid-sized city of Kennewick, Washington, located about 185 miles southeast of Puget Sound. The ship was built at Vigor Shipyards, formerly Todd Pacific Shipyards. She was launched on May 27, 2011, with her upper decks and interior still incomplete, and christened by Judy Clibborn, the Washington House Transportation Chairwoman. After her launch, Kennewick was to have construction completed at Vigor Shipyards, before being moved to Everett, Washington to be outfitted.

Kennewick began her sea trials on October 6, 2011, before her demonstrations to Washington State Ferries and the US Coast Guard began on October 12. Upon completion of the demonstrations, Washington State Ferries took delivery of the vessel on October 31, 2011, beginning further trials and crew training before Kennewick began operation between Port Townsend and Coupeville on February 14, 2012.
