= Chetzemoka =

Chief of the S'Klallam

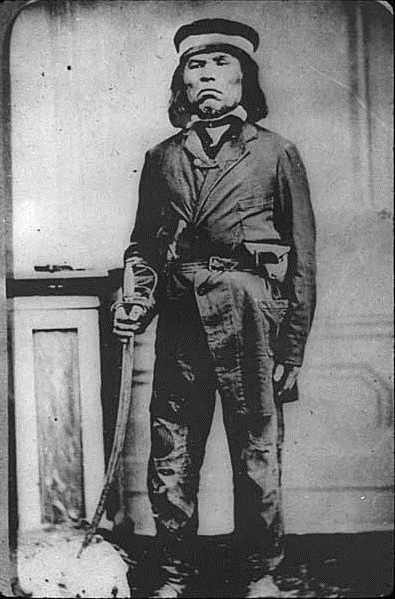
Chief Chetzemoka

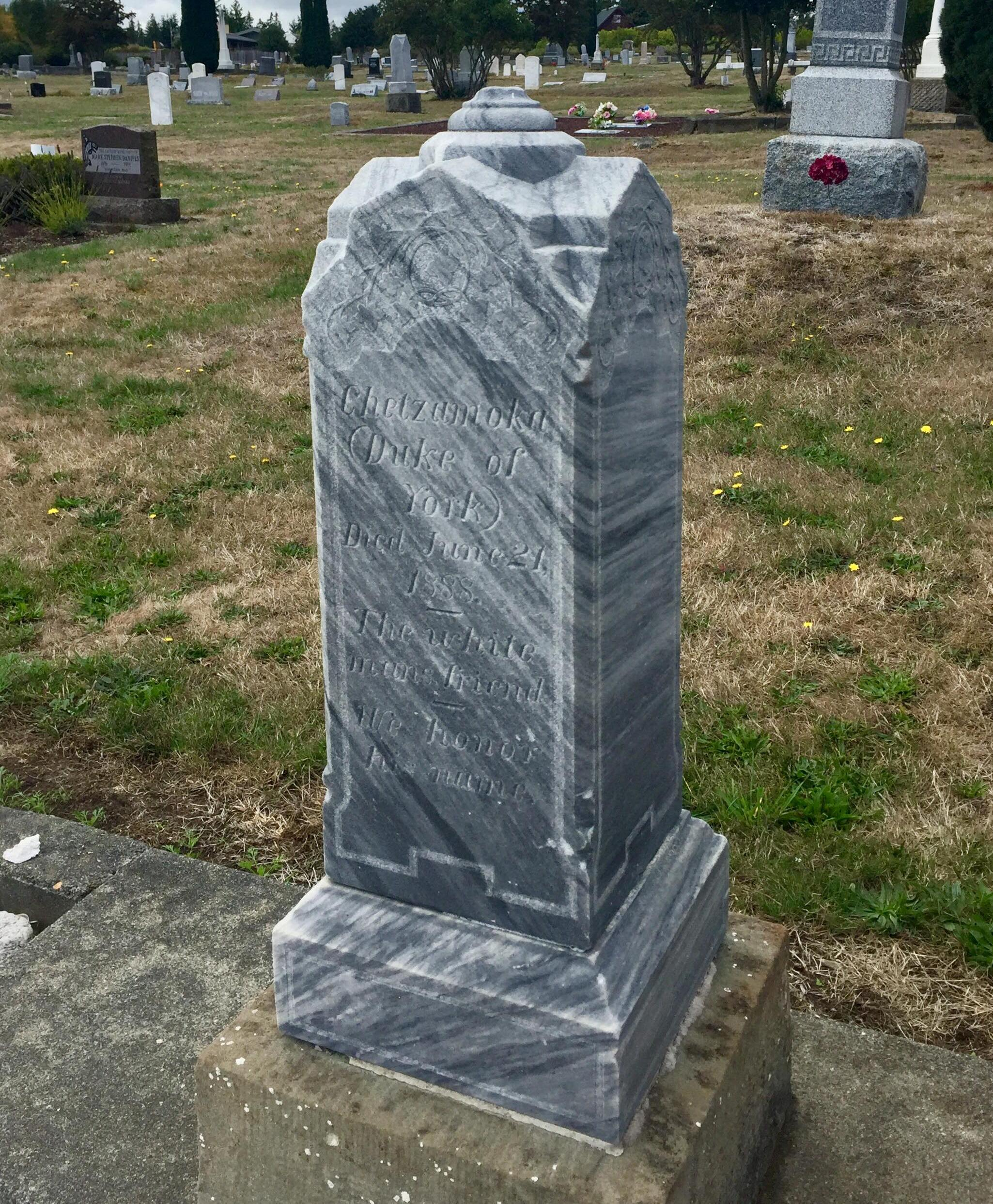
Chetzamoka (Duke of York) ~ Died June 21, 1888 ~ The white man's friend ~ We honor his name

číčməhán (also Cheech-Ma-Ham, Chits-Ma-Han or Chetzemoka) was born in about 1808 at KaTai, to Quah-Tum-A-Low and Lach-Ka-Nam, chief of the S'Klallam. Cheech-Ma-Ham was forty years old when the first white settlers arrived at Port Townsend, Washington. The settlers found his name difficult to pronounce, so they changed it to Chetzemoka, and he was given the "royal" nickname Duke of York. His son La-kaa-nim was nicknamed Prince of Wales, and his two wives were See-Hei-Met-za (nicknamed Queen Victoria) and Jenny Lind. His older brother, next in line to become chief, was called King George. King George was quarrelsome, unlike the diplomatic Duke. One day, after a disagreement, he packed up all of his possessions and paddled off to board a ship for San Francisco, never to return.

číčməhán traveled to San Francisco in the early 1850s, where he befriended James G. Swan.

The Superintendent of Indian Affairs recognized Cheech-Ma-Ham as chief of the S'Klallam in 1854, holding him responsible for the "good behavior" of his people. At Point No Point, in 1855, Chief Cheech-Ma-Ham signed a treaty giving up all S'Klallam land in exchange for retaining the rights to fish, hunt and gather in the S'Klallam usual and accustomed areas. Such treaties, pushed by Governor Isaac Stevens and largely misunderstood by the Indians, provoked the Indian Wars in 1855–56.

During these wars, a number of S'Klallam held a secret meeting to decide whether or not to kill the whites in Port Townsend. The S'Klallam deliberated for nine days, during which Cheech-Ma-Ham sent a daily signal of "danger." On the tenth day, the message from Signal Rock was, in essence, "danger is passed." The S'Klallam had given up their purpose. Cheech-Ma-Ham was considered a hero by the white population, and from that point on was immortalized by them. A bronze plaque was eventually placed on the rock he signaled from, and a park in Port Townsend bears the name Chetzemoka.

Prior to his death, Cheech-Ma-Ham named his son, Lach-Ka-Nim (Prince of Wales), chief. It was from Lach-Ka-Nim's nickname that the present-day Prince family name was derived. Cheech-Ma-Ham died in 1888 and was buried in the white cemetery, Laurel Grove, in Port Townsend.

MV Chetzemoka is a Kwa-di Tabil-class ferry built at Todd Pacific Shipyards in Seattle, Washington for the Washington State Ferries and named after Chief Chetzemoka.
