= Point Defiance Park =

Urban park in Tacoma, Washington, U.S.

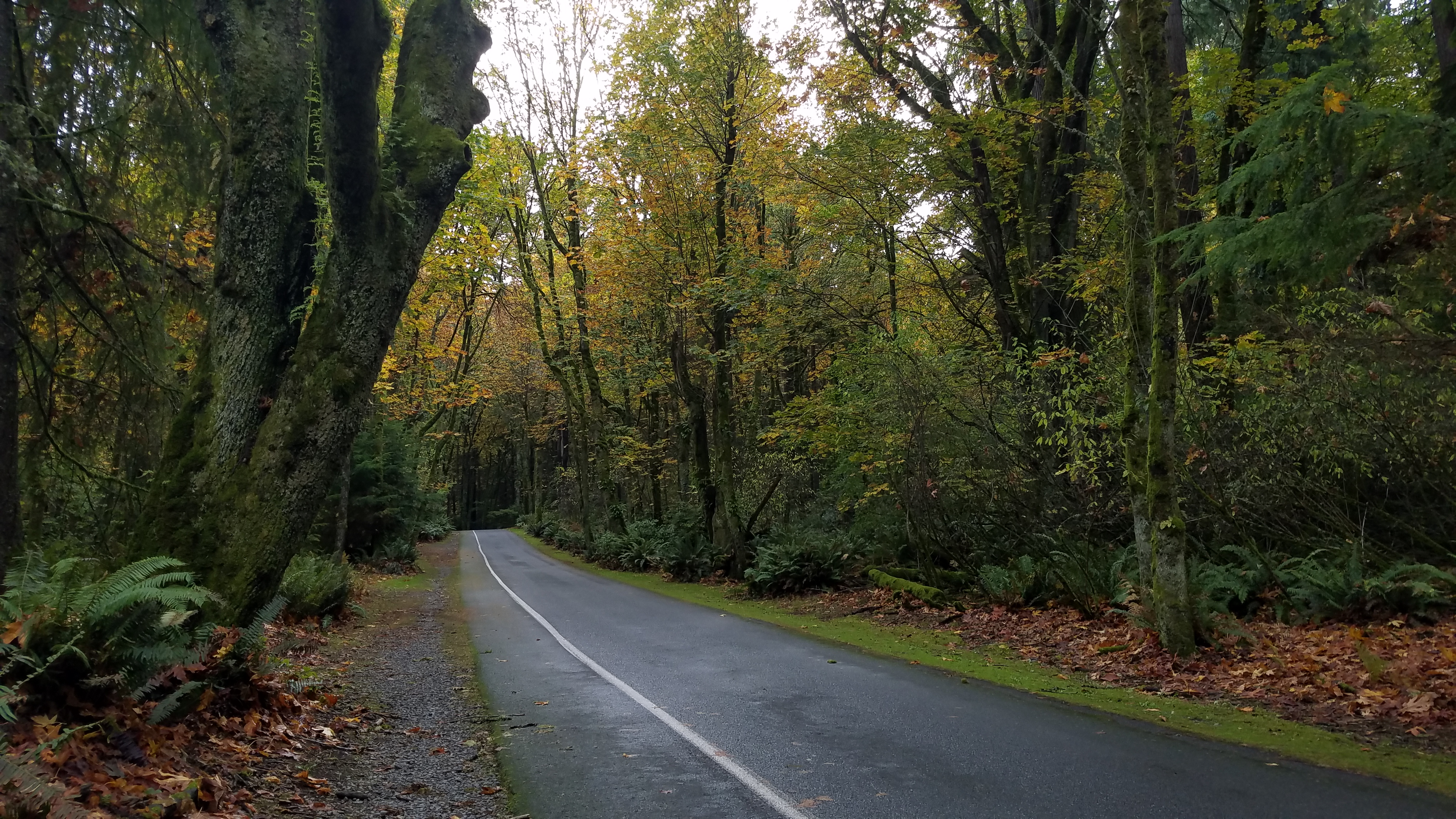
- Old growth forest along Five Mile Drive

- Location within Washington (state)
- Location: 5400 N. Pearl St. Tacoma, Washington 98407
- Coordinates: 47°19′N 122°32′W
- Area: 760 acres (3.1 km^{2})
- Operator: Metropolitan Park District of Tacoma
- Visitors: Over 3 million
- Open: 30 minutes before sunrise to 30 minutes after sunset
- Parking: Free
- Website: Official website

Point Defiance Park in Tacoma, Washington, United States, is a large urban park. The 760-acre (3.1 km^{2}) park includes Point Defiance Zoo & Aquarium, the Rose Garden, Rhododendron Garden, beaches, trails, a boardwalk, a boathouse, a Washington State Ferries ferry dock for the Point Defiance-Tahlequah route to Vashon Island, Fort Nisqually, an off-leash dog park, and most notably about 400 acres of old-growth forest. It receives more than three million visitors every year. Point Defiance Park is maintained and operated by Metro Parks Tacoma.

== Wildlife ==
Point Defiance Park offers something for all its visitors, both wildlife and people. Not all the wild animals are confined inside Zoo & Aquarium. From high bluffs overlooking the Tacoma Narrows people can watch bald eagles feed on salmon runs passing through on the strong tidal currents. Their calls can be heard from their nests in the old growth forest that is preserved and make up the northern 400 acres (1.6 km^{2}) of the park.

In winter, sea lions migrating from California feed in the swirling tides beneath the Gig Harbor overlook on the northernmost point of the peninsula. Harbor seals are abundant near on the east facing beach approaching the point. Seal pups are frequently observed north of Owen Beach in late summer and early fall (humans and their dogs should keep their distance to avoid spooking the pups). The park also provides habitat for mule deer, red foxes, coyotes, pileated woodpeckers, Douglas squirrels, western fence lizards, garter snakes, and raccoons. Point Defiance’s beaches and bluffs are also a good place to spot the occasional humpback whale or orca.

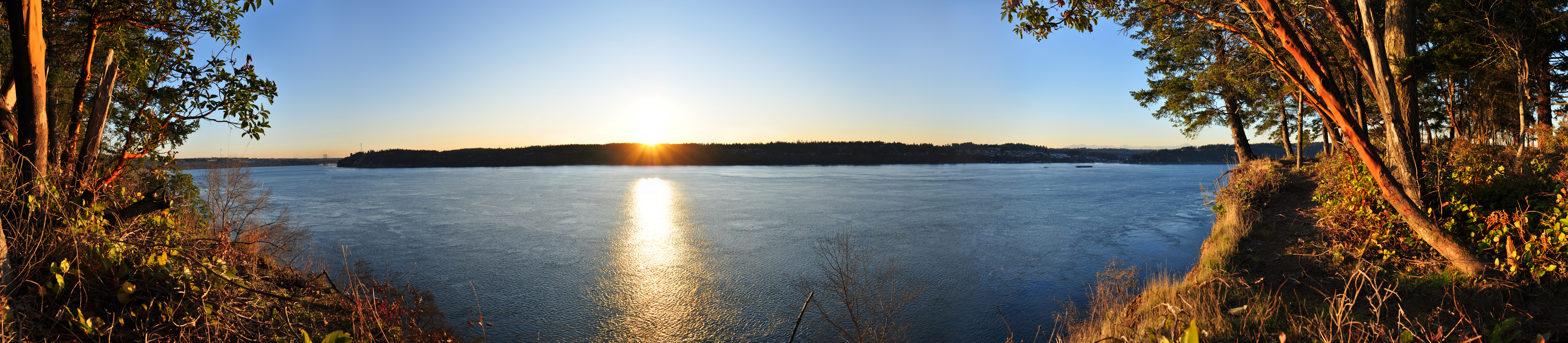
180° panorama from a western cliff overlook in Point Defiance Park. Appearing on the left is the Tacoma Narrows Bridge as well as the towers of Tacoma Power's Cushman Dam transmission line. The right side features silhouette views of the Olympic Mountains above Gig Harbor along with a tugboat and barge. A late-autumn sun sets over the Kitsap Peninsula casting golden light on a Pacific Madrona forest framing the image on both sides.

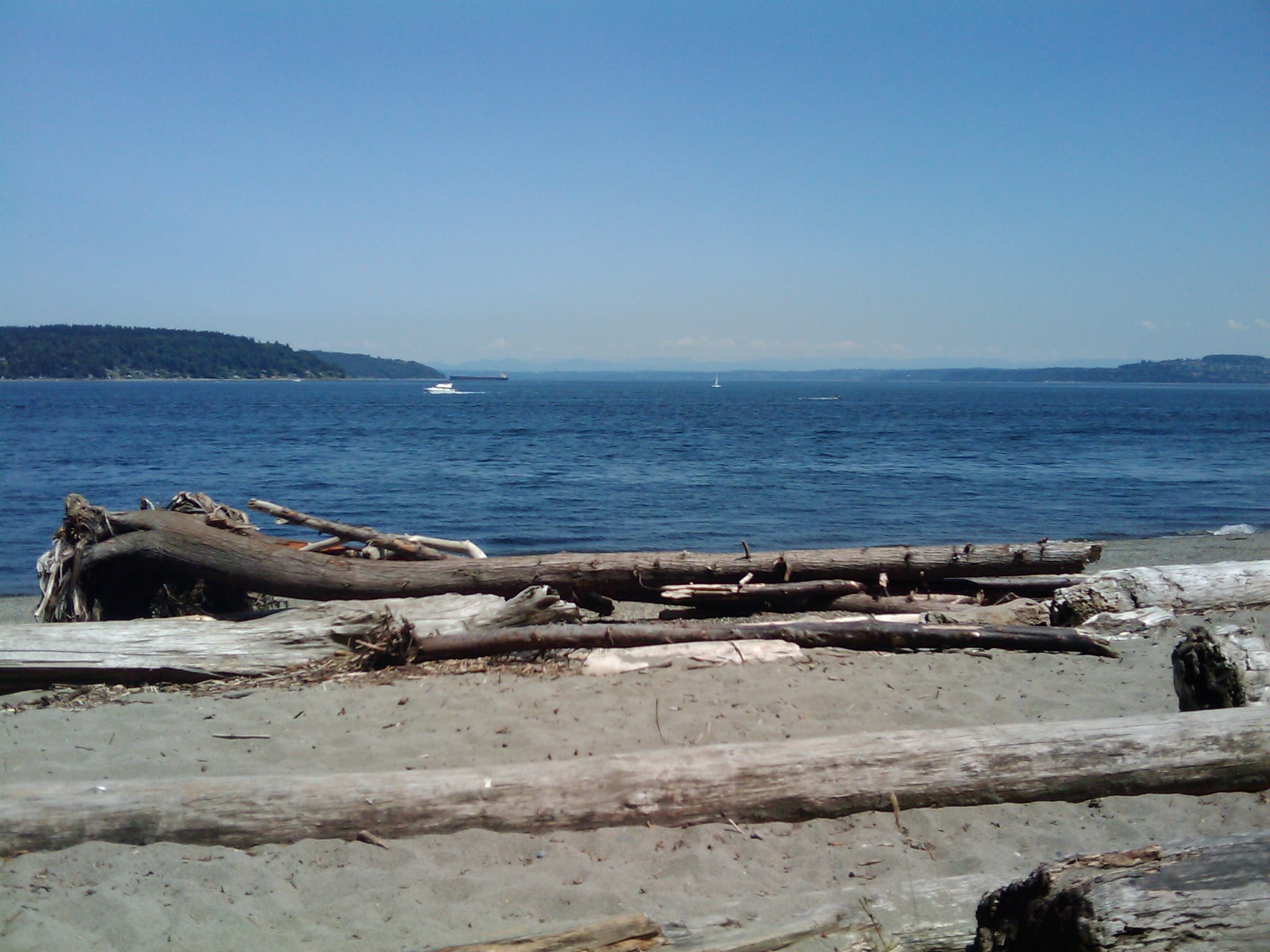
Owen Beach in Point Defiance Park

== History ==
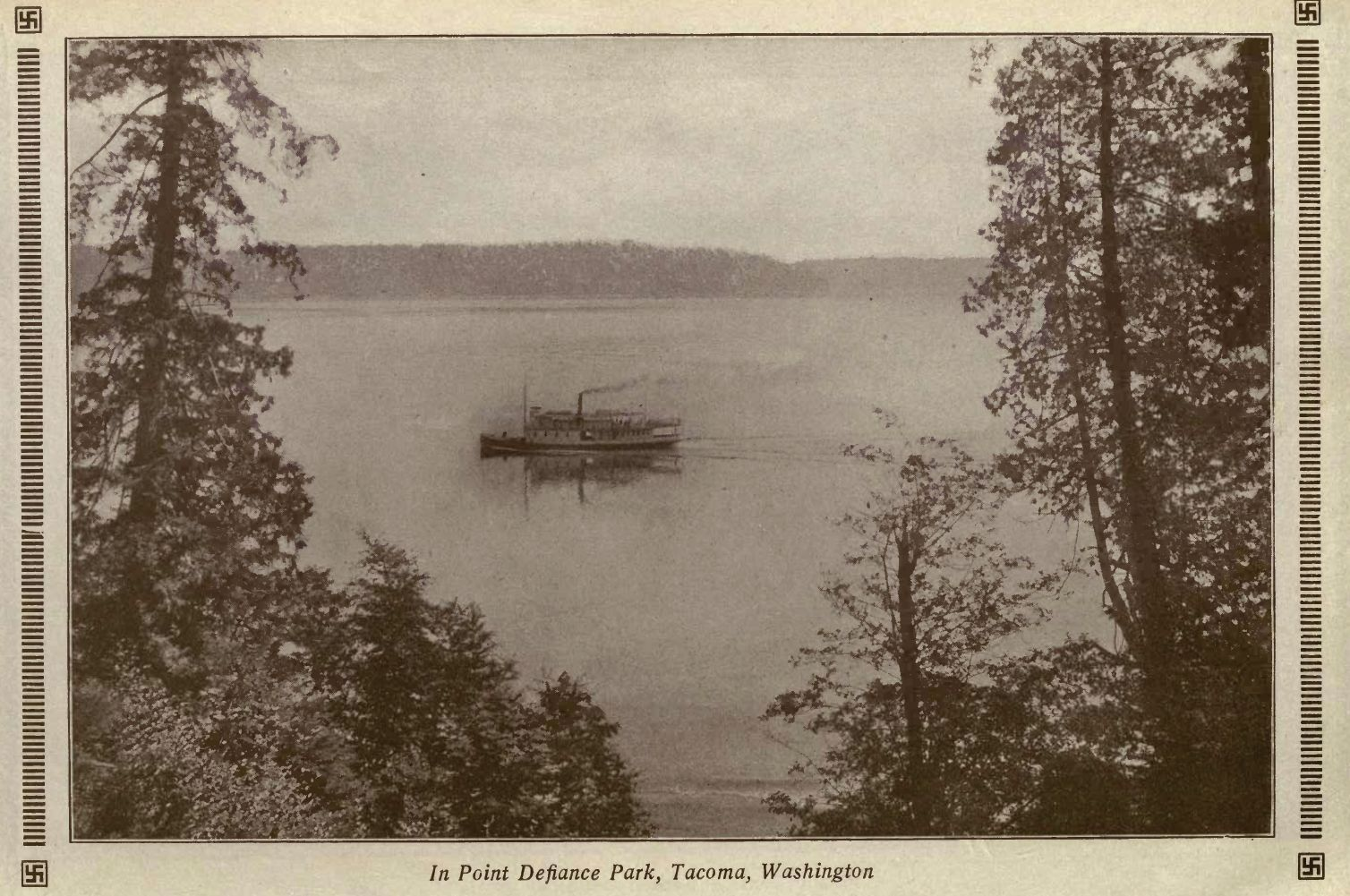
View from Point Defiance Park; photograph from the defunct literary magazine Overland Monthly (c. 1916).

Point Defiance Park began as a military reservation after the Wilkes Expedition visited Puget Sound in the 1840s to map the bays and estuaries. Wilkes is thought to have said that with a fort positioned at the point, and at Gig Harbor across the narrows, one could "defy" the world. The high cliffs and prominent location were never used for military operations. In 1888, President Grover Cleveland authorized its use as a public park after an appeal from Tacoma residents. It was the city's third park, after Wright Park and Ferry Park, and required the completion of a streetcar line under the provisions of the federal land transfer. In 1903, a waterfront pavilion and bandstand was completed. By 1907 a seaside resort designed by Frederick Heath offered heated saltwater bathing in a pavilion called the Nereides Baths located on a bluff above the boathouse.

In 1905, President Theodore Roosevelt signed legislation giving city full title to park. The park's first superintendent, Ebenezer Roberts, asked schoolchildren in 1895 to donate rose clippings to start a rose garden; today gardens have expanded to include native plants, herbs, iris, dahlia, and fuchsia; volunteers contribute time and plants. The Point Defiance Zoo was established in 1891 with three animals—two deer and a possum—and later grew into a large complex. An adjoining aquarium opened in 1933. Five Mile Drive was constructed in 1913 to provide a scenic driving route around the park.

Fort Nisqually is a living history replica of an Hudson's Bay Company outpost from the 19th century when the English trading company had trading forts stretching from Fort Vancouver on the Columbia River, Fort Nisqually on south Puget Sound near the Nisqually River and continuing to the Far North to Fort Yukon on the Yukon River in Canadian territory which later became the state of Alaska. In recent years, Fort Nisqually programs invite community members, including local tribal members, to a weekend of re-enacting — in period dress — this early period of trade and travel through the region by dugout cedar canoe.

In 1964, Point Defiance Park was home to the fairytale and nursery rhyme based attraction known as Never Never Land. Created by Alfred Petterson, the park featured various figurine characters from fables such as Humpty Dumpty, Jack and Jill, and the Little Red Riding Hood. The park brought in visitors until 2001 when Metro Parks shut down operations. In September 2021, nearly a decade after several figurines were destroyed in an arson fire, they were put up for auction. The money that was raised was used to support Metro Parks's historical assets and public art.

The American Planning Association designated Point Defiance Park as a 2011 Great American Place. In 2019, the city's second-division soccer team renamed itself to Tacoma Defiance in reference to the park.

The park opened Frank Herbert Trail and Dune Peninsula in July 2019 to honor science fiction writer Frank Herbert, known for his Dune novels, who was born in Tacoma. Dune Peninsula is a 11-acre (4.5 ha) to the east of the ferry terminal that was previously home to an ASARCO copper smelter. The smelter, which included a 571-foot (174 m) smokestack, closed in 1993 and was designated as a Superfund site by the United States Environmental Protection Agency due to its heavy contamination with arsenic and other pollution. Over 400,000 cubic yards (310,000 m^{3}) of dirt was used to clean up its site prior to opening as part of the park.

== Features and recreation ==
=== Gardens ===
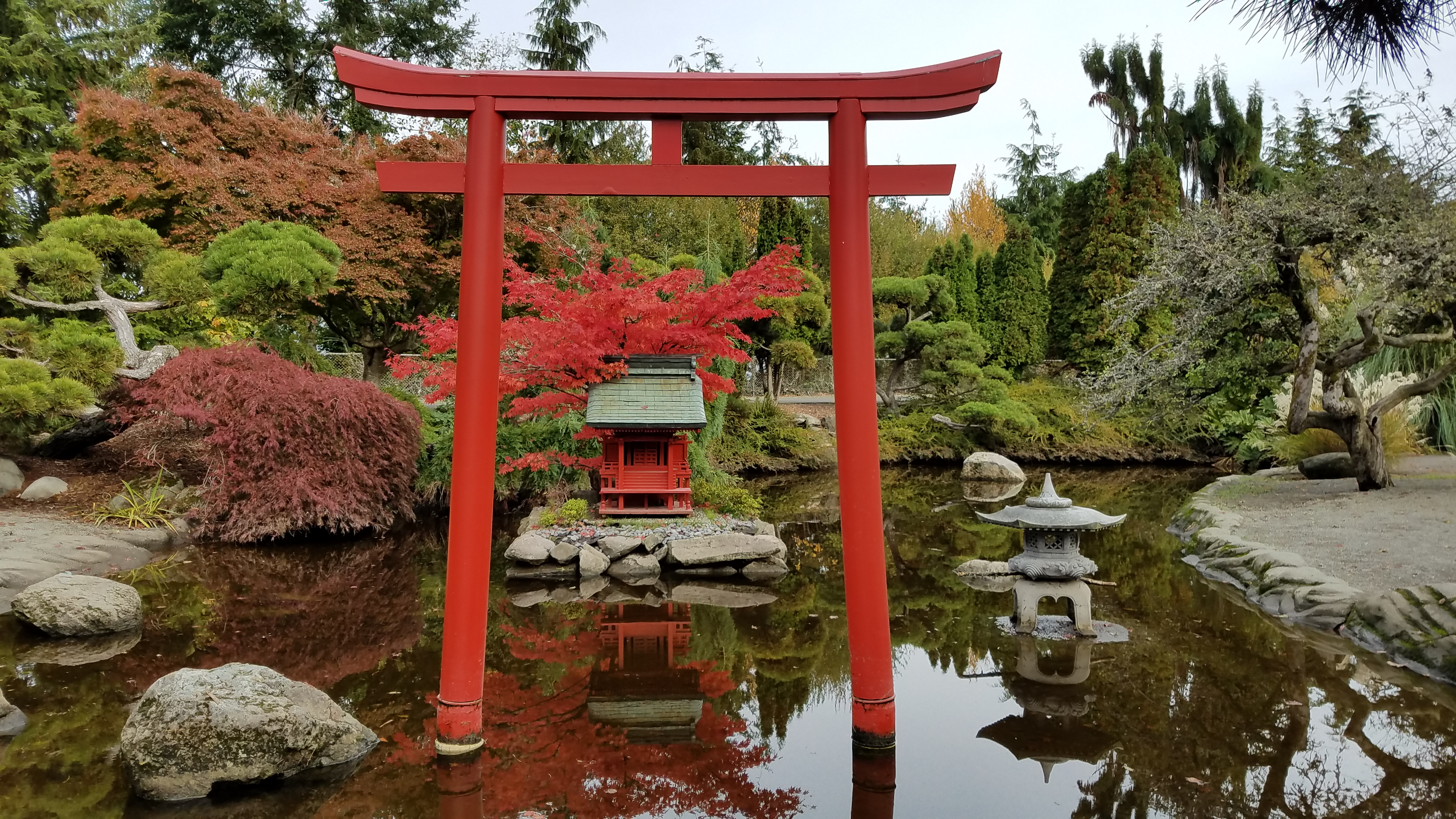
Japanese Garden at Point Defiance Park

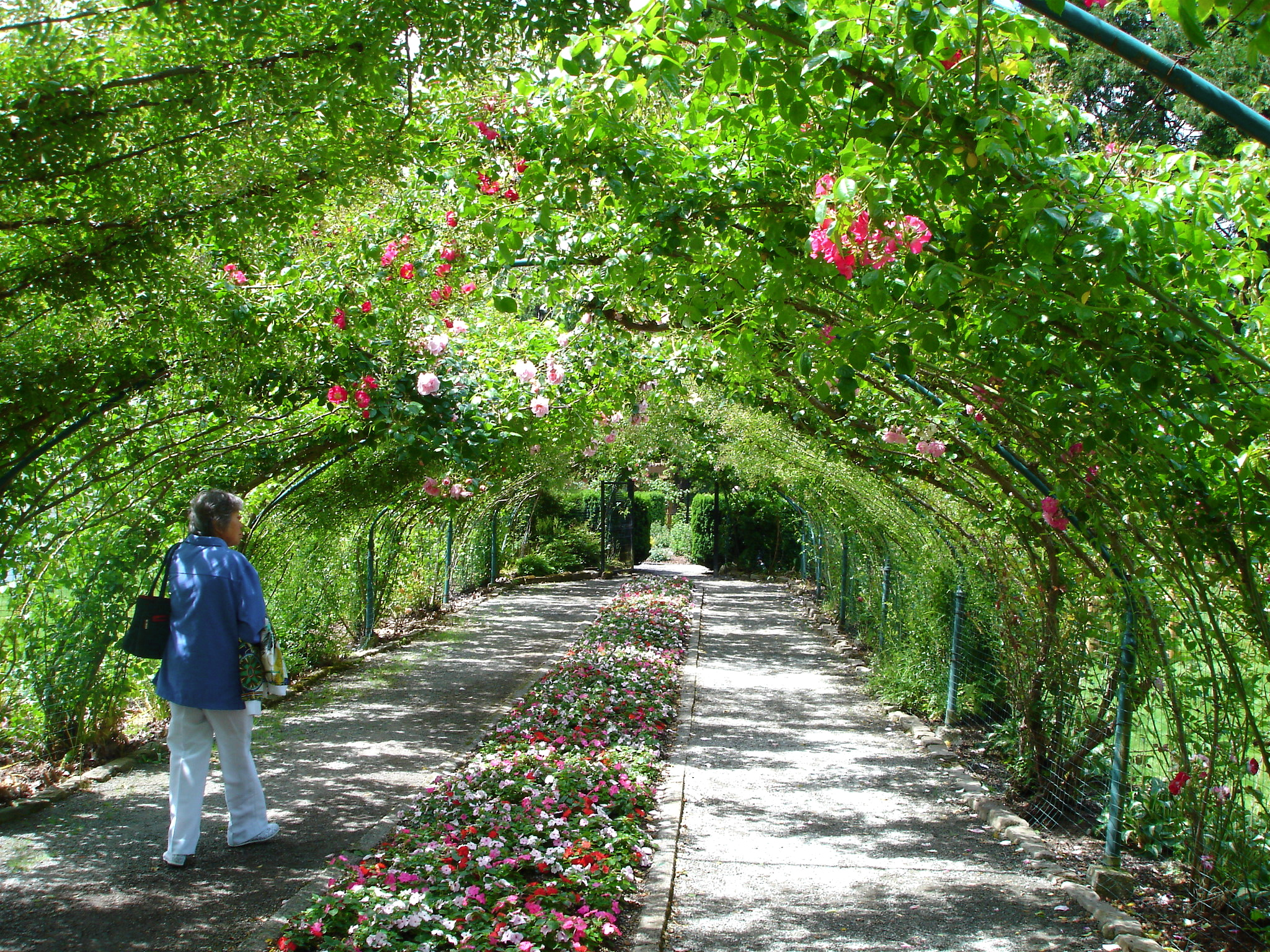
Rose Garden at Point Defiance

Point Defiance Park has a Japanese Garden, Rose Garden, and dahlia gardens surrounding the former superintendent's home, which was built in 1898 during the Yukon Gold Rush. The gardens are sited on a bluff looking down on a waterfront containing the boathouse, Anthony's Restaurant, and state ferry terminal. Other public gardens on site include the Native Plant, Herb, Fuchsia, and Iris gardens.

The prominent feature of the Japanese Garden is the Pagoda, built in 1914 as a streetcar station. It replaced an earlier shelter that was constructed by the Tacoma & Edison Railway Line in 1890 and was designed by Luther Twichell using Japanese motifs. The park's streetcars ceased operation on April 8, 1938, and the Pagoda was converted into a bus station that was used until 1962. A local garden club converted the building into a gathering space that hosted showrooms and installed a Japanese garden adjacent to the Pagoda, which was later listed on the National Register of Historic Places. The building was renovated in 1988 and damaged by an arson in April 2011, after which it was renovated again by Metro Parks Tacoma. The Pagoda also housed artifiacts from Never Never Land, a former playground with figurines that depicted Nursery rhyme characters, until the 2011 arson. The building reopened in January 2013.

=== Brownfields and boating facilities ===
After a century of depositing slag into the waters of Puget Sound, the ASARCO Tacoma Smelter created a peninsula to form the park's protected harbor. The Tacoma Yacht Club and Dune Peninsula Park sit on the peninsula's promontory as a guardian of snug harbor. A public boat launch at the entrance of the harbor is part of the park's recreational facilities.

=== Zoo and aquarium ===
Point Defiance Zoo & Aquarium is 1.1 miles (1.8 km) from the Pearl Street entrance to Point Defiance Park.

=== Science and Math Institute ===
In the fall of 2009, Tacoma Public Schools opened the Science and Math Institute (SAMI), a science- and math-centered magnet high school within Point Defiance Park. SAMI features classes on the beach, pagoda, forests, and Zoo. Metro Parks was approached by the school district and gave them space for portable classrooms on the site of the recently evicted Camp 6 Logging Museum. The school has a concept and schedule similar to the district's other Magnet high school, Tacoma School of the Arts (TSOTA). The SAMI institute features classes on natural sciences and mathematics. SAMI is an early introductory to the STEM classes and possible school routes and lifestyles.

=== Landscapes and activities ===
In addition to old-growth forest with 450-year-old Douglas firs are 250-foot vertical bluffs exposing the area's geologic history. The park has an off-leash dog park; fee-based attractions include Point Defiance Zoo & Aquarium and Fort Nisqually.

The park has a large network of roads and trails that are primarily used by joggers, cyclists, and hikers. The outer loop of Five Mile Drive was permanently closed to vehicular traffic in 2022 to prevent further erosion issues but remains accessible to non-vehicular users. There are many hiking trails along Pt. Defiance's bluffs and through its forest, including trails with sweeping views of Vashon Island, Dalco Passage, Gig Harbor, and the Tacoma Narrows Bridge.

From 1964 to 2010, the Camp 6 Logging Museum operated in the park.

=== Concerts ===
Beginning in 2025, Dune Peninsula at the park will be home to a series of summer concerts that are operated under a five-year contract with AEG Live. A temporary stage and an area with capacity for 5,000 spectators will be constructed on the site along with concessions and restrooms.
