= Science and Math Institute (Tacoma, Washington) =

High school in Washington, United States

Science and Math institute

Location
- 5502 Five Mile Drive; Tacoma, WA 98407
- 47°18′11″N 122°30′46″W

Information
- Type: High School
- Established: 2009
- Principal: Jon Ketler, Liz Minks, Joni Hall
- Faculty: 26.90 (FTE)
- Enrollment: 537 (2018-19)
- Student to teacher ratio: 19.96
- Website: sami.tacomaschools.org

Tacoma Science and Math Institute (also known as SAMi), is a public high school in the Tacoma Public Schools district. It is located in Metro Parks Tacoma in Tacoma, Washington. The school offers an integrated inquiry-based curriculum for students in grades 9-12 that combines the arts, science, math, and environmental and marine studies. It operates in partnership with local organizations, including the Point Defiance Zoo and Aquarium as well as local universities. SAMi also operates in partnership with other local schools, including its sister schools Tacoma School of the Arts (SOTA) and Industrial Design Engineering and Art (iDEA).

== History and facilities ==
SAMi was started in the Fall of 2009, when they opened their doors to the first freshman class (of 2013). The school expanded by adding one grade per year and as of 2012 offered all four high school grades (freshman, sophomore, junior and senior) in its program. In 2012-2013 the school began accepting Grade 8 students for the graduating class of 2017.

The school began with nine portable classrooms located near the Pt. Defiance boat trailer parking lot, in front of the parks maintenance and greenhouse facility, to the south of the Ferry Dock, the Tacoma Yacht Club, and Anthony's Diner. In the summer of 2015, the portable classrooms were moved to Pt. Defiance's Camp Six, the former site of a logging museum. The old location of SAMi has since been dug out during Tacoma's Destination Point Defiance renovation process.

Since its inception the school has been seeking to expand the effective area of the campus into the park and use buildings and structures in the park as classrooms. In 2009-2010 the school was granted access to the parks greenhouses for a plant biology class, which continued until the demolishing of the greenhouses in 2016. In the 2010–2011 school year regular access was granted to the Point Defiance Zoo & Aquarium, the Pagoda and the historical Lodge. It also holds its Outdoor Education class in the areas around the Fort Nisqually Living History Museum.

SAMi was restricted from using the pagoda after an arsonist set it on fire on April 15, 2011. The building sustained significant damage and the arsonist is now in custody. The restored and renovated pagoda is still used by SAMi for classes.

In the February 2013 bond election, voters approved funding for a new permanent facility for the school adjacent to the Point Defiance Zoo and Aquarium. Construction was expected to be completed by 2015, but the building was not opened until October 2017. This new building, the Environmental Learning Center (ELC), is designed to function as an extra 8 classrooms and a learning space for preschoolers. During the summer, the Point Defiance Zoo will use it as an outreach space.

The primary school buildings now consist of portables at the old Camp 6, the Environmental Learning Center (ELC), Pagoda, and Point Defiance Zoo & Aquarium classrooms. The whole of Point Defiance Park is considered the schools campus, according to the school's staff. However, student roaming (usually only allowed during the student's lunch break) is prohibited south of Pearl Street area. This is loosely enforced.

== Mission and goals ==
"The mission of the Science and Math Institute is to provide a creative path of learning that emphasizes individual expression and growth through science and mathematics as central elements in academic achievement and life-long endeavors."

SAMi intends to keep expanding its campus, including allowing students access to nearby downtown Ruston.

== Academics ==
Many different types of classes are offered at the Science and Math Institute. Aside from the required high school classes, SAMI offers science and art oriented electives. Students also are enrolled in classes earlier than they would be at most other high schools in the district and other areas.

SAMi uses a system called "Pathways" that assists students with selecting the best classes that will benefit their future, whether it be a career or simply college endeavors. Presently the two pathways are 'Natural Sciences' and 'Physical Sciences'

Students also can enroll in two classes per day at SOTA and/or iDEA by splitting the academic day between SAMi, SOTA and iDEA.

== Current Leadership ==
SAMi's leaderships is split between 'downtown' and on campus. Two co-directors (vice principals) run day to day operations while reporting to the coalition schools' (SAMi, SOTA, IDEA) central admin (principal), who are based out of downtown.

=== Coalition School Central Admin ===
2016- 21: Jon Ketler & Kristen Tinder

2021- 23: Jon Ketler & Zack Varnell

=== Recent Co-Directors (Vice Principals) ===
2016 - 17: Liz Minks & Ralph Harrison

2017 - 19: Liz Minks & Joni Hall

2019 - 21: Liz Minks & Anne Tsuneshi

2021 - 23: Liz Minks & Joni Hall

== Enrollment ==
Students from the high school venture out to local middle schools and present their school to all of the middle school students in a massive presentation. Potential applicants are told details of the school and how they can be a part of it.

The student selection process is simple. An interested person submits their application with their best school work under the graduation requirement categories and then are interviewed by a SAMi student and a staff member. If a student completes the application and takes part in the interview, their name is put into lottery system which will produce the next school years names, depending on how many new students SAMi takes that year.

SAMI at times has been critiqued for only accepting students into their 9th grade, generally not accepting transfers during students 10th, 11th, or 12th grades years from in or out of district.
