= Tacoma Public Schools =

Tacoma, Washington Public Schools of Tacoma, Washington

Location
- Central Administration Building; 601 South 8th Street; Tacoma, Washington 98405 United States

District information
- Type: Public
- Grades: Pre-K through 12
- Superintendent: Dr. Josh Garcia

Students and staff
- Students: 28,000

Other information
- Website: Tacoma Public Schools

Tacoma School District No. 10, commonly called Tacoma Public Schools, is a school district headquartered in Tacoma, Washington, United States. Composed of 36 elementary schools, 13 middle schools, 11 high schools, and 4 early learning centers. It is the third-largest school district in Washington State. Tacoma Public Schools serves approximately 28,000 students PK-12 and has nearly 5,000 employees, making it one of the largest employers in the greater Tacoma area.

== History ==
In the decades preceding World War I, Tacoma Public Schools, like much of the United States, were largely influenced by a new influx of European immigrants that had been creating challenges among both governmental and religious agencies in devising a plan for best addressing ethnic integration. Many immigrant families, primarily from eastern and southern European descent, were of rural backgrounds and struggled to adapt to a more urban and advanced way of life. In 1913, the National Conference on Immigration and Americanization developed a list of three essential aspects of immigrant assimilation: literacy, health and hygiene, and the learning of democracy. As a result, schools across the nation began introducing new policies and programs that were intended to promote and teach the importance of these three values.

Closely following national trends, the Tacoma School District began widespread incorporation of nurses, health clinics, showers, and home economic departments, all of which were designed to improve health and hygiene within school property. Tacoma Public Schools also witnessed a significant expansion in social services, including after-school programs, summer school, and availability of on-site lunches. This focus on the civic responsibilities of schools resulted in the improvement of libraries, lunchrooms, administrative offices, and other rooms designated towards providing the necessary space and tools that address new communal values and concerns.

United States involvement in World War I had a significant effect on the demographics of both Tacoma and its school system. The 1914 opening of the Panama Canal, and the 1917 establishment of Fort Lewis (Now Joint Base Lewis-McChord) resulted in a significant population increase in Tacoma and its surrounding areas. The Panama Canal succeeded in expanding business and industry associated with the Port of Tacoma, while Fort Lewis quickly became the largest in the United States at the time, consisting of 37,000 soldiers. From 1915 to 1920, enrollment in Tacoma Public Schools had risen from 14,211 to 18,023 (a 22% increase). To address the rapid growth of student population, the district school board debated between three possible educational models, all of which would have an effect on the future construction of schools. The models included the 8-4 system, the 6-6 system, and the 6-3-3 system. The 8-4 system, which was the typical model for schools prior to World War I, had grades one through eight in elementary schools with grades nine through 12 in high schools. The proposed 6-6 system advocated for grades one through six in elementary school, with grades seven through 12 in high school. The 6-3-3 system, which was eventually adopted, advocated for grades one through six in elementary school, grades seven through nine in middle school, and grades 10 through 12 in high school.

Promoting the transition to this new elementary, intermediate, high school model, Tacoma voters authorized a $2.4 million plan in 1923, which jump-started construction of six new intermediate schools and additions to several existing elementary schools. Jason Lee was the first intermediate school to be constructed, soon followed by James P. Stewart and Morton M. McCarver middle schools. Franklin B. Gault, Allan C. Mason, and Robert Gray middle schools were the last constructed, and all opened on the same day the following year.

The onset of World War II resulted in another significant population spike within Tacoma and its schools, as both the Port of Tacoma and Fort Lewis boomed with similar economic prowess as seen previously in World War I. From 1950 to 1956, public school enrollment shot from 22,157 to 29,778, illustrating a 26% increase. The overcrowding of aging elementary schools and need for construction in suburban areas prompted the school board to draft a new building campaign, which emphasized quick, cheap, and flexible school construction.

== Boundary ==
The district includes almost all of Tacoma, Browns Point, Dash Point, Ruston, most of Fircrest, plus portions of Lakewood, Midland, and University Place.

== List of schools ==
=== Elementary schools ===
- Arlington Elementary School
- Birney Elementary School
- Blix Elementary School
- Boze Elementary School
- Browns Point Elementary School
- Bryant Montessori (PK-8)
- Crescent Heights Elementary School
- DeLong Elementary School
- Downing Elementary School
- Edison Elementary School
- Edna Travis Elementary School
- Fawcett Elementary School
- Fern Hill Elementary School
- Franklin Elementary School
- Geiger Montessori School
- Grant Center for the Expressive Arts
- Jefferson Elementary School
- Larchmont Elementary School
- Lister Elementary School
- Lowell Elementary School
- Mary Lyon Elementary School
- Manitou Park Elementary School
- Mann Elementary School
- Northeast Tacoma Elementary School
- Point Defiance Elementary School
- Jennie Reed Elementary School
- Roosevelt Elementary School
- Sheridan Elementary School
- Sherman Elementary School
- Skyline Elementary School
- Stafford Elementary School
- Stanley Elementary School
- Tacoma Online (K-12)
- Washington/Hoyt Elementary School
- Whitman Elementary School
- Whittier Elementary School

=== Middle schools ===
- Baker Middle School
- Bryant Middle School (PK-8)
- First Creek Middle School
- Giaudrone Middle School
- Gray Middle School
- Hilltop Heritage Middle School
- Hunt Middle School
- Mason Middle School
- Meeker Middle School
- Stewart Middle School
- Tacoma Online (K-12)
- Truman Middle School
- Wainwright Intermediate School

=== High schools ===
High Schools (Grades 9-12)
High School	Type	Established	Enrollment	Mascot	WIAA Classification	Notes
Henry Foss	Comprehensive	1973	604	Falcons	2A	Located in Central Tacoma
Lincoln	Comprehensive	1913	1,560	Abes	3A	Located in East Tacoma
Mount Tahoma	Comprehensive	1961	1,423	Thunderbirds	3A	Located in South Tacoma
Oakland Alternative	Alternative	1988	113	Eagles	N/A	Located in Central Tacoma
School of the Arts	Magnet	2001	658	N/A	N/A	Located in downtown Tacoma
Science and Math Institute	Magnet	2009	598	Buckminsterfullerenes or Stem Cells, Peacocks (unofficial)	N/A	Located in Point Defiance Park.
School of Industrial Design Engineering and Art	Magnet	2016	393	Table	N/A	6701 S Park Ave Tacoma, WA
Stadium	Comprehensive	1906*	1,721	Tigers	4A	*1906 as Tacoma High School, 1913 as Stadium. Located in North/Downtown Tacoma.
Silas	Comprehensive	1958	1,166	Rams	3A	Formerly "Wilson"; located in North/West Tacoma.

== District Facts ==
=== Demographics ===
Student Count	30,877
American Indian or Alaskan Native	371
Asian	3,045
Hawaiian or Pacific Islander	802
Black or African American	5,877
Hispanic or Latino	5,068
Multi Racial	2,077
Free or reduced-price meals	19,515
Special education	3,661
English Language Learners	3,186
Elementary schools	37
Middle schools	9
Comprehensive high schools	5
Alternative learning sites	14
Total Employees	5,035
Teachers	2,028
Beginning salary	$40,105
Average salary	$64,239
Estimated per pupil cost	$12,690

=== Funding ===
Total operating budget	$363,959,013
Local tax revenue	$84,119,382
Local non-tax revenue	$6,111,595
State general revenue	$167,082
State special revenue	$52,566,900
Federal general revenue	$310,504
Federal special revenue	$39,650,008
Other school districts	$1,800,000
Other entities	$1,116,376
Other financing sources	$1,500,000

== School Board ==
Since 2021, Dr. Josh Garcia has been the superintendent of the district, having previously served as Deputy Superintendent since 2012.

=== Lisa Keating, Director, Position 1 ===
Elected to Office: November 2019

Current Term Expires: November 2025

=== Enrique Leon, Director, Position 2 ===
Appointed to Office: February 2018

Elected to office November 2019

Elected to office November 2021

Current Term Expires: November 2027

=== Korey Strozier, Director, Position 3 ===
Appointed to Office: November 2020

Elected November 2021, November 2023

Current Term Expires: November 2029

=== Chelsea McElroy, Director Position 4 ===
Elected to Office: November 2021

Current Term Expires: November 2027

=== Elizabeth Bonbright, President, Position 5 ===
Appointed to Office: November 2019

Elected: November 2021, November 2023

Current Term Expires: November 2029

== Graduation Rates ==
Reaching a graduation rate of 91.7%, the Tacoma School District's class of 2024 witnessed its highest graduation rate since the State began tracking the statistic in 2003.

In 2012, the school board set a goal of reaching 85% graduation by 2020, which it achieved. The goal to increase the graduation rate came after criticism that labeled Tacoma high schools as "dropout factories," with graduation rates as low as 55%.

== Athletic and Activities ==
High school students of Tacoma Public Schools compete in the Narrows League for athletics, and member schools are a part of West Central District III and the Washington State Interscholastic Activities Association (WIAA). Students have the ability to compete in as many as 21 different sports at the high school level, while middle school students from grades six to eight can compete in 11 different sports at the junior varsity, varsity, and C-team levels.

According to the round table of South Sound athletic directors, funding has been a primary concern in the ability of schools to maintain and improve their athletic programs. Terry Jenks, athletic director of Curtis High School, mentions increasing difficulty in finding quality coaches, as schools remain unable to offer salaries to make coaching a full-time job that accounts for cost-of-living increases. There has also been a recorded decrease in attendance at sporting events, which Puyallup high school AD Rick Wells attributes to an offering of more sports, but fewer people interested in them individually. Decreased attendance is also supported by the rise of social media, where students have the opportunity to catch up on scores and highlights without being present at the games itself. Also mentioned is an increase of poverty, resulting in less students who have personal transportation and are able to travel to games and events on their own accord.
