= Tacoma School of the Arts =

Location
- 302 S. Ninth Street; Tacoma, Washington; United States

Information
- Type: Visual and Performing Arts School
- Established: 2001; 25 years ago
- School district: Tacoma Public Schools
- Dean: Bliss King
- Principal: Jon Ketler and Renee Froembling
- Staff: 35.70 (FTE)
- Student to teacher ratio: 17.03
- Schedule: Block
- Campus type: Urban
- Website: sota.tacomaschools.org

The Tacoma School of the Arts (SOTA or TSOTA) is the only arts school in the greater Tacoma, Washington, area. SOTA historically only housed grades 10 through 12, but beginning in the 2012 school year, it began admitting students in the 9th grade as well. SOTA's student capacity is around 600 students. SOTA was established in the fall of 2001, with help from the Bill & Melinda Gates Foundation. Classes are housed in multiple venues across downtown Tacoma, in buildings that have historically served many purposes—including a department store, a music store, and a dance studio.

SOTA, SAMI, and IDEA also offer University of Washington Credits through multiple classes and beginning in 2014 offer over 20 College in the High School classes for credit through Tacoma Community College.

SOTA was one of three Washington state school winners of the inaugural state Schools of Excellence in Arts Education Award, part of the national program of the John F. Kennedy Center for the Performing Arts Schools of Distinction in Arts Education Awards. Shortly after, SOTA was one of only four schools in the inaugural year to win at the national level.

== Students ==
Many SOTA projects are student-run, including some aspects of the school's administration.

SOTA Music Box Building
- Address: 302 S. Ninth Street Tacoma, WA 98402; United States
- Owner: Tacoma School of the Arts
- Capacity: ≈600
- Type: Urban

Construction
- Opened: 2001
- Architect: McGranahan Architects

Students have directed theatrical productions including The Glass Menagerie and The Last of the Darling Brent Girls, the latter also written by a student.

Departments offered include those of the Visual Arts (Illustration, graphic design, photography and film) and those of the Performing Arts (songwriting and audio recording, instrumental music, singer-songwriter, vocal music, dance, and technical theater).

== Daily life and academics ==
The school day is arranged to have four periods a day, in block periods over the week. Mondays and Thursdays at SOTA students attend periods 1–4, and on Tuesdays and Fridays students attend periods 5–8. While they have Mentor group Wednesdays. There are 20 minute passing periods, as classes are held in over 10 different buildings and businesses. Three of these buildings are owned by Tacoma Public Schools and they are all within one square mile. Some classes are housed in the University of Washington Tacoma, Tacoma Art Museum and the Broadway Center for the Performing Arts.

Annual events include mentor day in the park, and SOTA Camp.

For the 2020–2021 school year during which the COVID-19 pandemic was occurring, many students chose remote learning options at SOTA on Microsoft Teams. Students were arranged into two A and B blocks by last name, with A starting in the morning and B starting in the afternoon. Instead of the usual eight classes, students now only had four classes each semester with the entire schedule changing at the end of one. To compensate for the lack of classes, each class that did not already do so awarded one full credit rather than half. Periods 1/5-2/6 took place on Mondays and Thursdays, with periods 3/7-4/8 occurring on Tuesdays and Fridays. Mentor Project Groups (Advisory classes) were also moved from Friday to Wednesday.

== Student opportunities ==
In 2008, SOTA created its own FIRST Robotics Competition team with the help of Team 360 from Bellarmine Preparatory School. They are Team 2557, the SOTABots. Their first year, the SOTABots came in second, won Rookie of the Year in the FIRST Microsoft Seattle Regional, and went on to get 22nd place in their division in the FIRST Championship.

Since 2008, the SOTABots have won the Microsoft Seattle Regional in 2010, the Seattle Cascade Regional in 2012, and multiple awards for their Gracious Professionalism and their safety practices.

== Notable alumni ==
Staff
Name	Position	Notes
Jared Pappas-Kelley	Video & Screenwriting Instructor	Co-creator of Toby Room magazine and curator of ArtRod
Brent Hartinger	Creative Writing Instructor	Author of the award-winning banned-book Geography Club
Garth Stein	Creative Writing Instructor	Author of The Art of Racing in the Rain

Students
Name	Year of Graduation	Notes
Che Ortiga	2004	Actor/ Drag Artist aka Misterrr
Madelaine Petsch	2012	Actress in Riverdale
Gabriel Mooney	2015	Artist; Ghoulavelii
Ellia Coggins	2017	Model

== In popular culture ==
Several SOTA buildings were used in the film 10 Things I Hate About You; the guitar store in the film is now part of the SOTA music department, as well as Club SOTA, an all-ages club hosted by the school.

== Sister schools ==
The Tacoma Science and Math Institute, or SAMI, opened for the 2009–2010 school year. Industrial Design, Engineering, and Arts, also known as IDEA, was opened in the 2016–2017 school year. They are both the district's other magnet schools, with a schedule and concept similar to SOTA.
