= MV Chetzemoka =

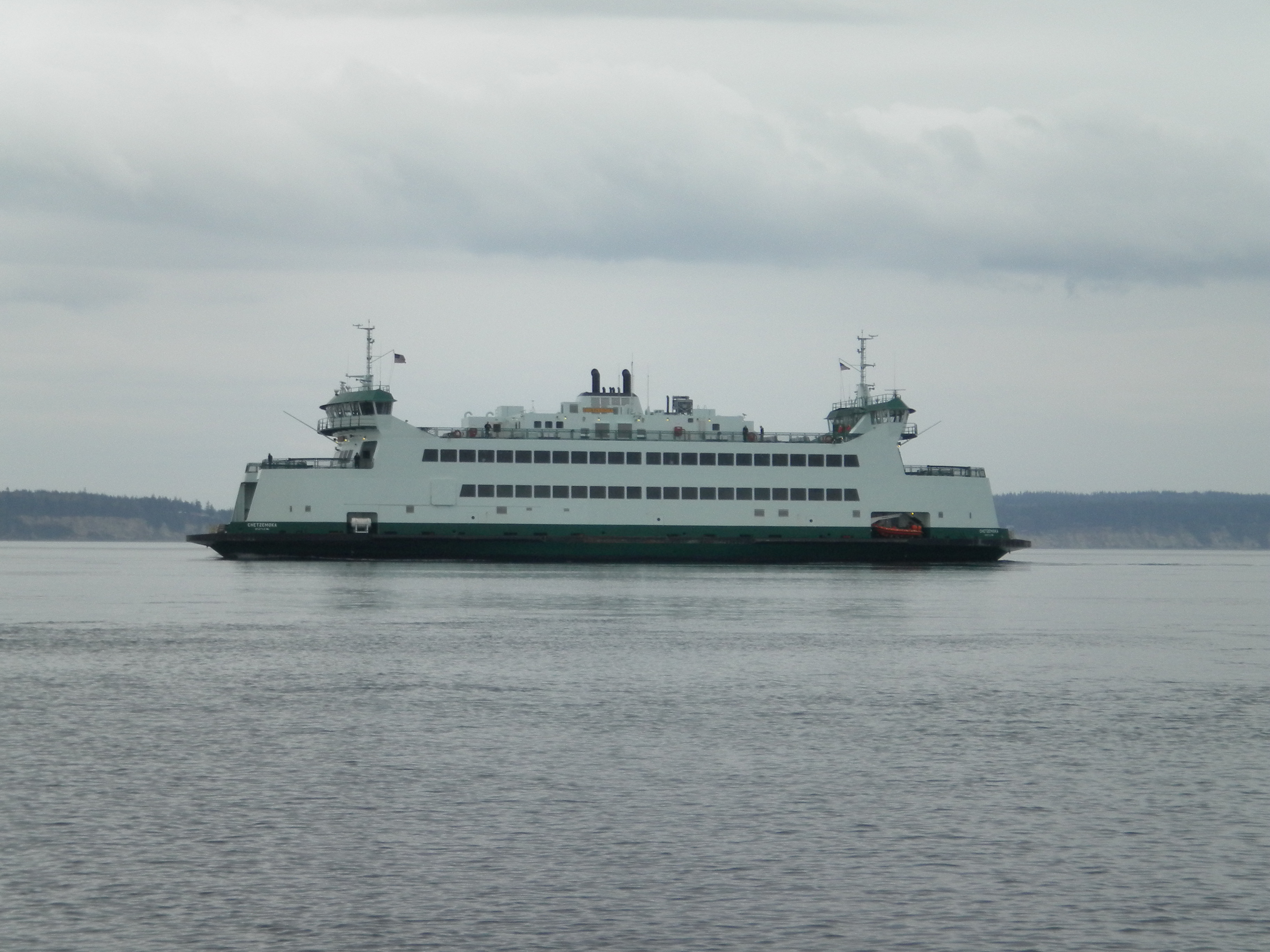
- Chetzemoka arriving at Keystone (2011)

History
- Name: Chetzemoka
- Owner: Washington State Ferries
- Operator: Washington State Ferries
- Route: Point Defiance-Tahlequah
- Builder: Todd Pacific Shipyards, Seattle
- Cost: US$77.5 million
- Launched: March 2, 2010
- Maiden voyage: November 14, 2010
- In service: November 15, 2010
- Identification: IMO number: 9347669; MMSI number: 367463060; Callsign: WDF5502
- Status: In service

General characteristics
- Class & type: Kwa-di Tabil-class auto/passenger ferry
- Tonnage: 4,623 GT
- Displacement: 2415
- Length: 273 ft 8 in (83.4 m)
- Beam: 64 ft (20 m)
- Draft: 11 ft (3.4 m)
- Decks: 6
- Deck clearance: 16 ft (4.9 m)
- Propulsion: Diesel, fixed pitch propeller
- Speed: 16 knots (30 km/h; 18 mph)
- Capacity: 64 vehicles, 748 passengers
- Crew: 10

MV Chetzemoka ("The Chetzy") is a Kwa-di Tabil-class ferry built at Todd Pacific Shipyards in Seattle, Washington for the Washington State Ferries. It was scheduled to start on the Port Townsend-Coupeville (Keystone) (Note: The Washington State Department of Transportation renamed the Keystone ferry terminal to Coupeville beginning with the Fall 2010 sailing schedule, and currently refers to the terminal as "Coupeville (Keystone)".) route in September 2010, but sea trials revealed excessive vibrations in the vessel's propulsion system. The ferry was christened by Governor Christine Gregoire and began service November 14, 2010.

The vessel was named after the Klallam chief Chetzemoka, who was influential during the early European-American settlement of Port Townsend.

The Chetzemoka began service to Vashon Island on January 23, 2012, replacing the now-retired MV Rhododendron on the Point Defiance-Tahlequah route.

== Design ==
The Chetzemoka's design is based on that of the MV Island Home, a ferry that is owned by The Woods Hole, Martha's Vineyard and Nantucket Steamship Authority. The particular class has had some mechanical issues, causing some in Washington to question the use of the design.

The Chetzemoka's design is somewhat unusual for a Washington State Ferry, as the vessel has two elevators, multiple stairwells, and a smoke stack on the same side of the ferry, instead of being symmetrical, aside from having a single elevator on one side of a typical Washington State Ferry. This oddity in design has given the vessel a pronounced 1 degree list, causing some to call the vessel "Eileen" (I Lean). When the boat is loaded, the list is not noticeable. The Chetzemoka is also the first "smaller scale" vessel to allow access to the "Texas Deck", the area on top of the vessel between pilot houses. Only the Super-class, Jumbo-class, and Jumbo Mark-II-class ferries allow such access. The Chetzemoka is also the first vessel in the Washington State Ferries fleet to have a mezzanine deck, between the main passenger cabin and the car deck, which on one side is primarily configured to hold bicycles (instead of them being relegated to the car deck), and the other simply for passengers. These mezzanine decks are not connected, except via the main passenger cabin, allowing for a full 16 feet (4.9 m) clearance in the center of the vessel.

After some time in service, ballast was added to the vessel correcting the stability issues.

== Incidents ==
On December 4, 2016, the Chetzemoka collided with a smaller vessel, the Nap Tyme in Dalco Passage, in between Vashon Island and Point Defiance. The collision was minor, with no injuries.

On December 24, 2016 the captain of the Chetzemoka suffered a medical emergency and fell upon the controls causing the vessel to pull away from the dock while it was still tied up minutes from its scheduled departure. No damage was done to the vessel but the dock's apron was damaged shutting down the Point Defiance Terminal for a week.
