= MV Rhododendron =

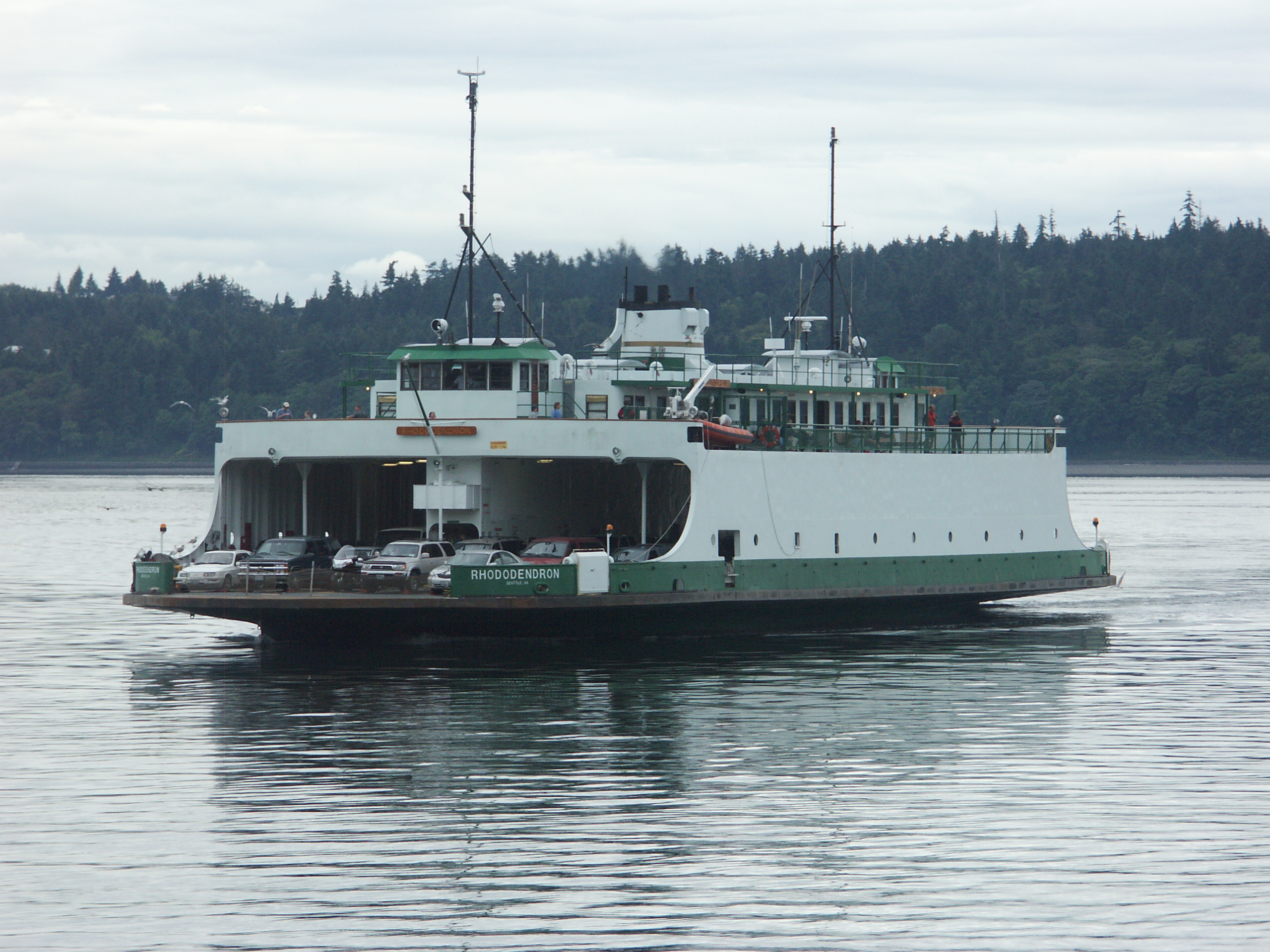
- MV Rhododendron arriving at Tahlequah Ferry Terminal

History
- Name: 1947-1951: Gov. Herbert R. O'Conner; 1951-present: MV Rhododendron
- Owner: 1947-1951: Chesapeake Bay Ferry System; 1951-2013: WSDOT; 2013-present: Atlantic Capes Fisheries
- Operator: 1947-1951: Claiborne-Annapolis Ferry Company; 1951-2012: Washington State Ferries
- Port of registry: 1951-present: Seattle, Washington, United States
- Builder: Maryland Drydock Company, Baltimore
- Completed: 1947; Refit: 1990
- Out of service: January 23, 2012
- Identification: IMO number: 8836118; MMSI number: 366772790; Callsign: WB6079; Official Number: 2516446
- Status: Retired

General characteristics
- Class & type: Rhododendron-class auto/passenger ferry
- Tonnage: 937
- Length: 227 ft 6 in (69.3 m)
- Beam: 62 ft (18.9 m)
- Draft: 10 ft (3.0 m)
- Deck clearance: 13 ft 6 in (4.1 m)
- Installed power: 2,172 hp
- Propulsion: 2 Diesel engines
- Speed: 11 kn (20 km/h)
- Capacity: 546 passengers; 48 vehicles (max 15 commercial)

The Motor Vessel Rhododendron was the sole Rhododendron-class ferry operated by Washington State Ferries. She was named for the state flower of Washington, the rhododendron. She was referred to affectionately as "The Rhody" by residents of Vashon Island.

The Rhododendron was one of two similar Chesapeake Bay ferries that were purchased to become part of the WSF fleet in the 1950s; the other being the now-retired MV Olympic. The Rhododendron's former name was the MV Governor Herbert R. O'Conor. She was originally purchased to be used in the interim while other new ferries were being built.

The ferry was retired in January 2012 and was sold in February 2013. It is currently anchored in Fanny Bay, British Columbia, where it serves as a storage and operations platform for nearby oyster farming.

== Career ==
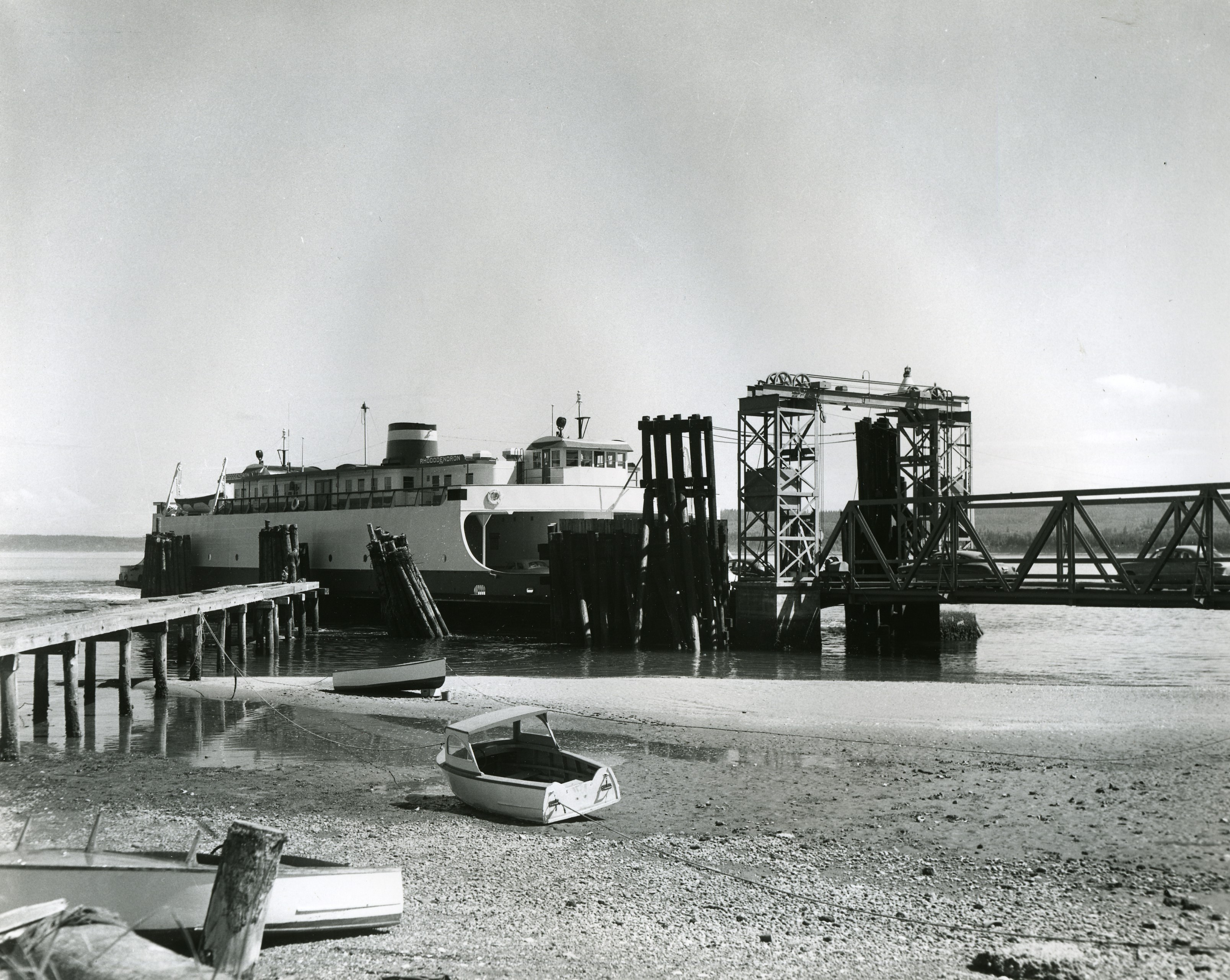
Rhododendron, circa 1955

Her original use in Washington from 1953 to 1961 was on a route from the Olympic Peninsula to the Kitsap Peninsula, near the current site of the Hood Canal Bridge. Her service there ended when the Hood Canal Bridge was built.

At that time, she was reunited with the Olympic and reassigned to the Mukilteo-Clinton route, where she stayed until 1974.

In 1975, Washington State Ferries (WSF) acquired the Port Townsend to Keystone route from a private company and reassigned the Rhododendron and the Olympic to this route.

In 1983, the Rhododendron was mothballed and stored at the WSF maintenance facility at Eagle Harbor. In 1990, the ferry was completely reconditioned, with its rotted superstructure completely replaced.

Due to her construction, she was not permitted to operate more than one mile (1.6 km) from shore. Consequently, in 1993 she was assigned to the Point Defiance to Vashon Island route, a 12-minute trip that is a total of 1.5 miles (2.4 km) long. For a short time in 2008 the Rhododendron was leased to Pierce County for service to Anderson Island.

The Rhody remained on the Point Defiance-Tahlequah route until she was retired in 2012. Her final scheduled sailing was at 2:10 pm on January 23, 2012, after which she was replaced by the MV Chetzemoka.

The state attempted to sell the ship in an online auction in November 2012, but the US$300,000 winning bid was later withdrawn. On February 26, 2013, the Rhody was sold for $275,000 to Island Scallops, who operates scallop farms on Vancouver Island near Qualicum Beach, British Columbia and is a subsidiary of Atlantic Capes Fisheries. Island Scallops plans to use the ferry as a support vessel based in Fanny Bay, BC and will remove her engines.

On March 11, 2013, the Rhododendron left Eagle Harbor (slip 1) for the last time, arriving in Fanny Bay on the following day.
