= Keystone, Island County, Washington =

Unincorporated community in Washington, US

Keystone, Washington
- Unincorporated community
- Location within Washington (state) Location within the United States
- Coordinates: 48°09′50″N 122°37′50″W
- Country: United States
- State: Washington
- County: Island
- Elevation: 3 ft (0.91 m)
- Time zone: UTC-8 (Pacific (PST))
  - Summer (DST): UTC-7 (PDT)
- Area code: 360
- GNIS feature ID: 1511914

Keystone is a small unincorporated community on Whidbey Island in Island County, Washington, in the northwestern United States. It is near the Keystone ferry landing, a dock at Keystone Harbor for the Washington State Ferries' Coupeville to Port Townsend route. The route provides a maritime link for State Route 20 across Admiralty Inlet to the Olympic Peninsula. Since its establishment in the 1930s, the ferry route to Port Townsend was known as the Keystone-Port Townsend Ferry; the name was changed in 2010 at the suggestion of the Central Whidbey Chamber of Commerce in order to avoid confusion from tourists and visitors to Whidbey Island.

Keystone is located about four miles south of Coupeville, next to Fort Casey State Park, Camp Casey, and is two miles from Ebey's Prairie National Historic Preserve. There is a residential area and farms in Keystone, including the historic Crockett Barn located next to the Crockett Blockhouse and Crockett Lake. Currently, the only business in Keystone is Callen's Restaurant, located directly across Highway 20 from the ferry landing and boat launch parking area.
