= Dalco Passage =

Tidal strait in Puget Sound

Coordinates: 47°19′18″N 122°30′41″W

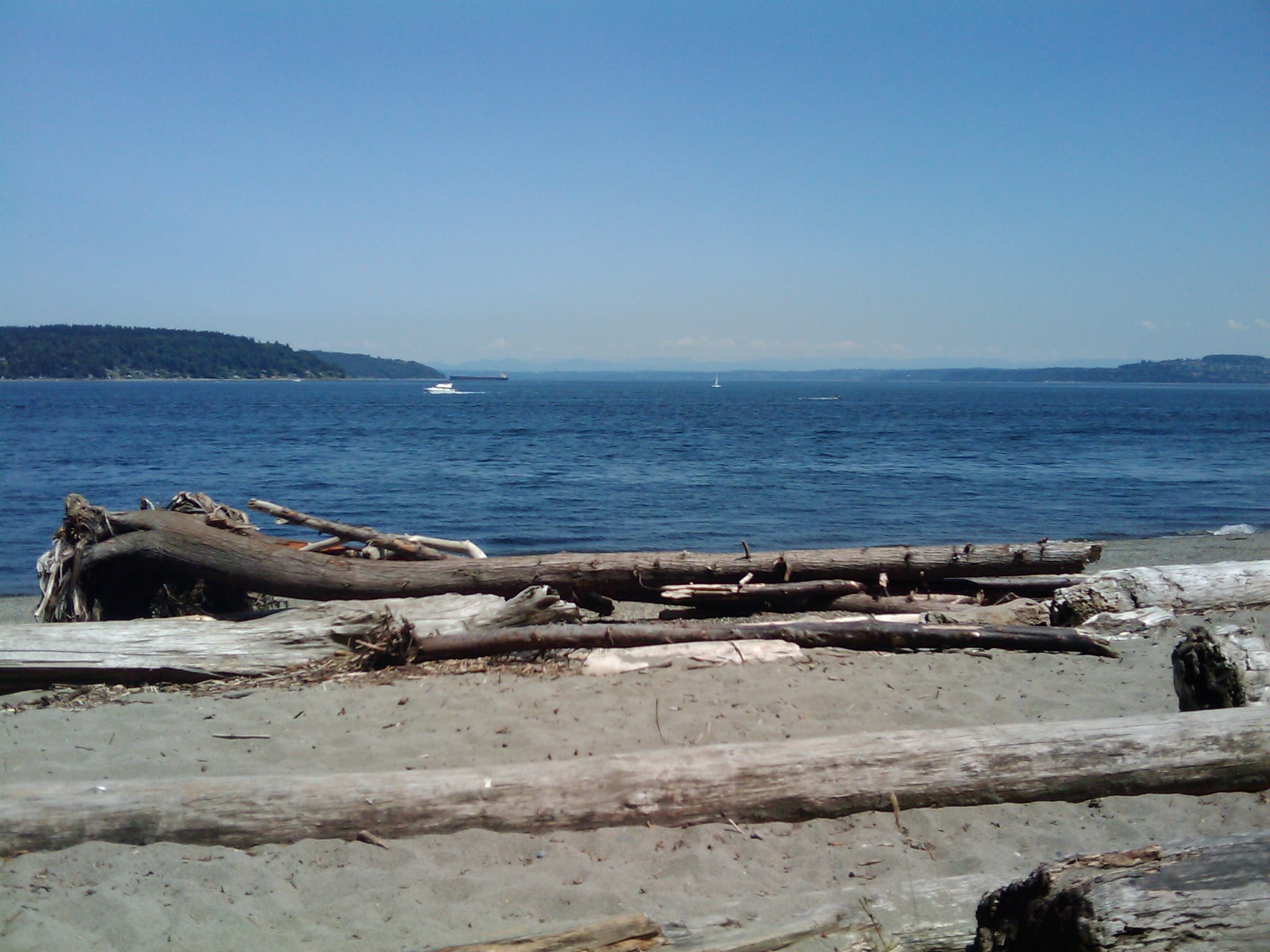
Dalco Passage

Dalco Passage is a tidal strait within Puget Sound in the U.S. state of Washington. Located between the southern end of Vashon Island and the mainland near Tacoma, Dalco Passage connects the northern main Puget Sound basin to the southern basin, via the Tacoma Narrows strait. Colvos Passage, Commencement Bay, and Quartermaster Harbor are also connected to Dalco Passage.

A United States Coast Survey report said the Wilkes expedition named the strait "Dalco" in 1841, but the origin of the name is unknown.
