= Ferries of San Francisco Bay =

San Francisco Bay in California has been served by ferries of all types for over 150 years. John Reed established a sailboat ferry service in 1826. Although the construction of the Golden Gate Bridge and the San Francisco–Oakland Bay Bridge led to the decline in the importance of most ferries, some are still in use today for both commuters and tourists.

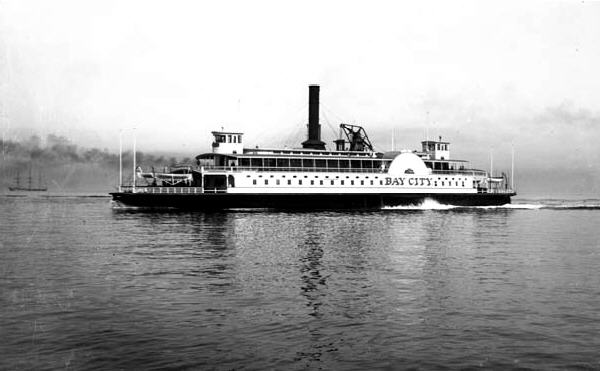
The Southern Pacific Company's Bay City ferry plies the waters of San Francisco Bay in the late 19th century.

== The Creek Route ferries (1851–1937) ==
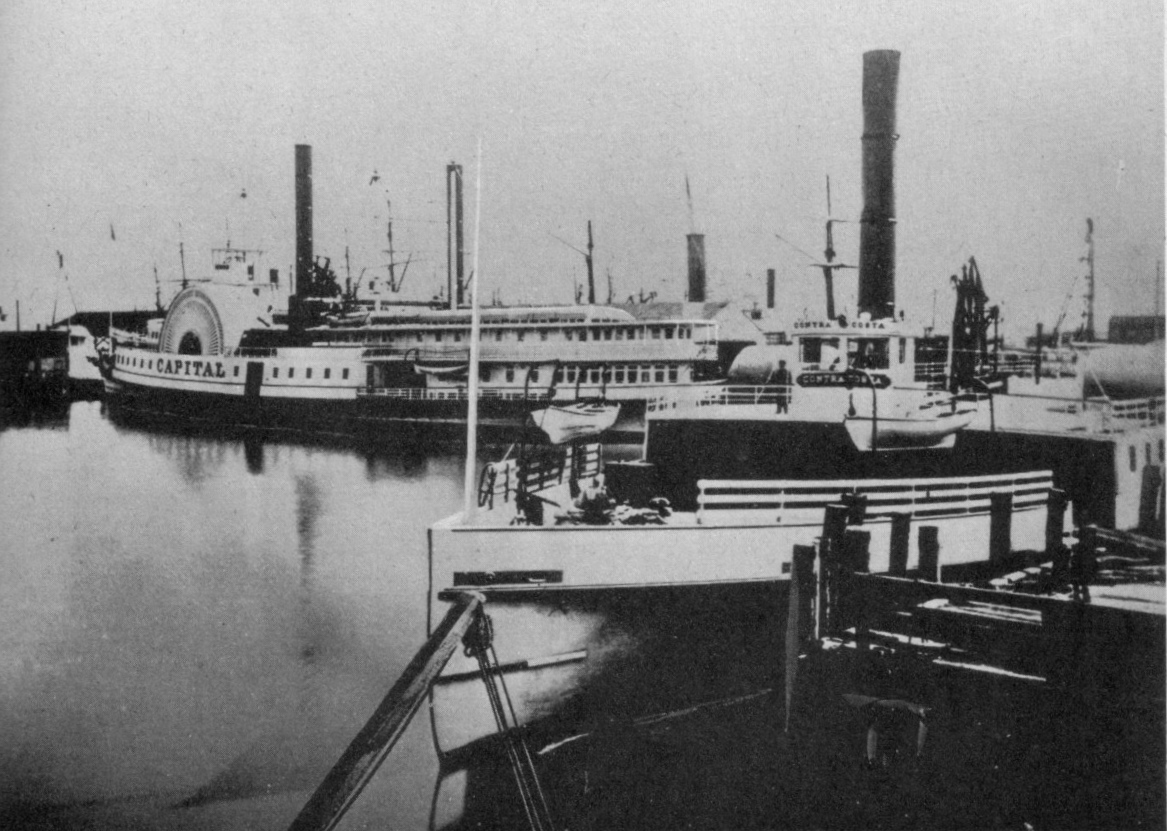
Contra Costa, in the foreground, was one of the earliest ferries built expressly for trans-bay service. Capital, in the background, formerly a Sacramento River steamboat, served the route from 1876 to 1896. Both were built by John Gunder North.

One of the earliest ferry routes ran between San Francisco and Oakland on what was called the "creek route". The name derived from the Oakland landing site located at the foot of Broadway where Jack London Square is today, fronting on what is today called the Oakland Estuary, an inlet of San Francisco Bay. The estuary, which in the 1800s included what is today's Lake Merritt, was the "creek". In 1851, Captain Thomas Gray, grandfather of the famous dancer Isadora Duncan, began the first regular ferry service to San Francisco from the East Bay. Service started with the stern-wheel Sacramento River packet General Sutter and the small iron steam ferry Kangaroo. Service was augmented in 1852 by Caleb Cope, the small ferry Hector powered by a steam sawmill engine, and the river packets Jenny Lind and Boston. Boston burned that year and was replaced first by William Brown's San Joaquin River packet Erastus Corning and then by Charles Minturn's river packet Red Jacket. In 1853, Minturn formed the Contra Costa Steam Navigation Company and had the ferry Clinton built expressly for trans-bay service. A second ferry, Contra Costa began operating over the route in 1857. Contra Costa Steam Navigation Company acquired San Antonio Steam Navigation Company with ferries San Antonio and Oakland by merger before being purchased by the San Francisco and Oakland Railroad (SF&O) in 1865. Ferries continued operating along the Creek Route under railroad ownership until 1937.

== Railroad ferries (1862–1958) ==
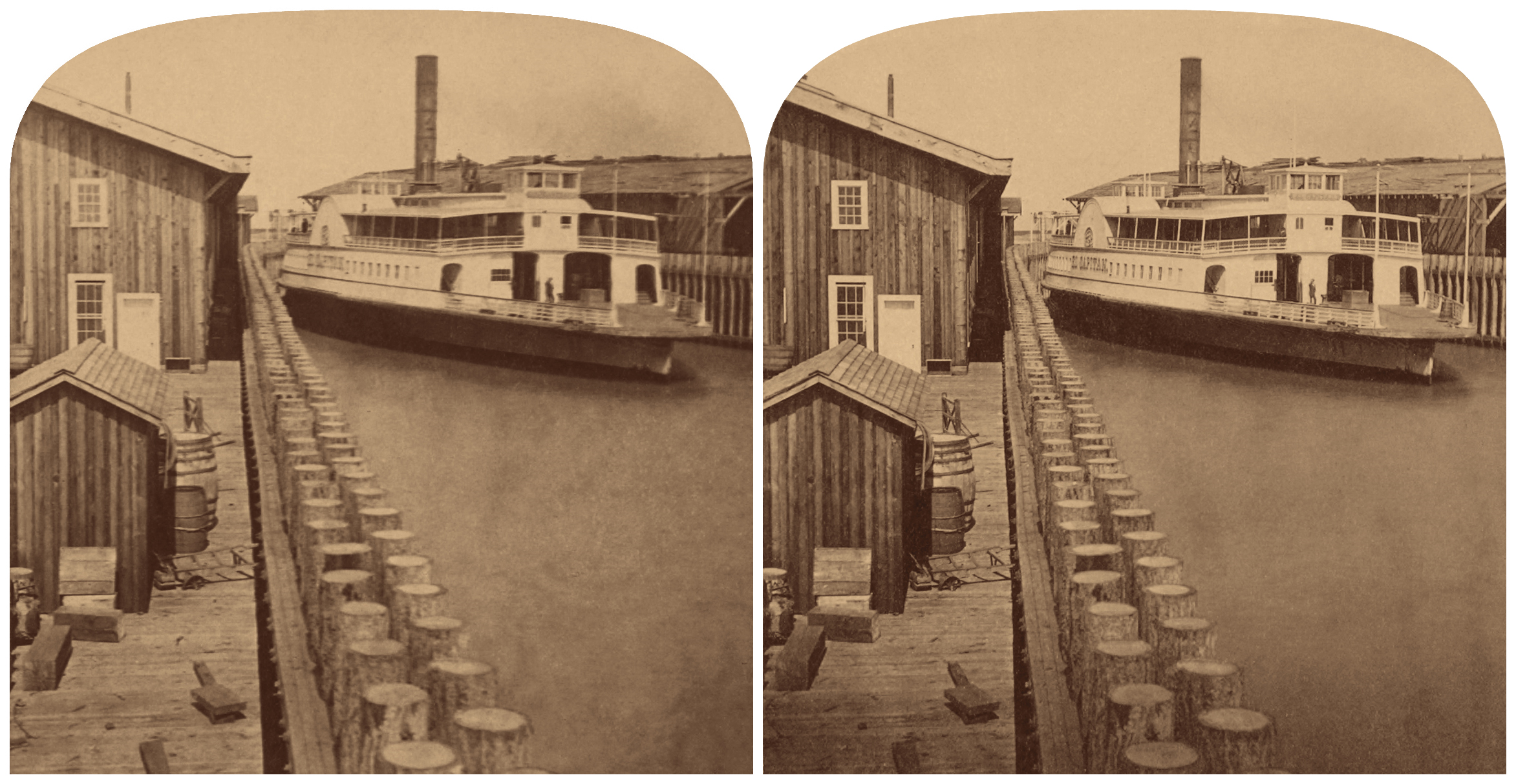
Central Pacific ferry El Capitan was the largest ferry on San Francisco Bay when built in 1868.

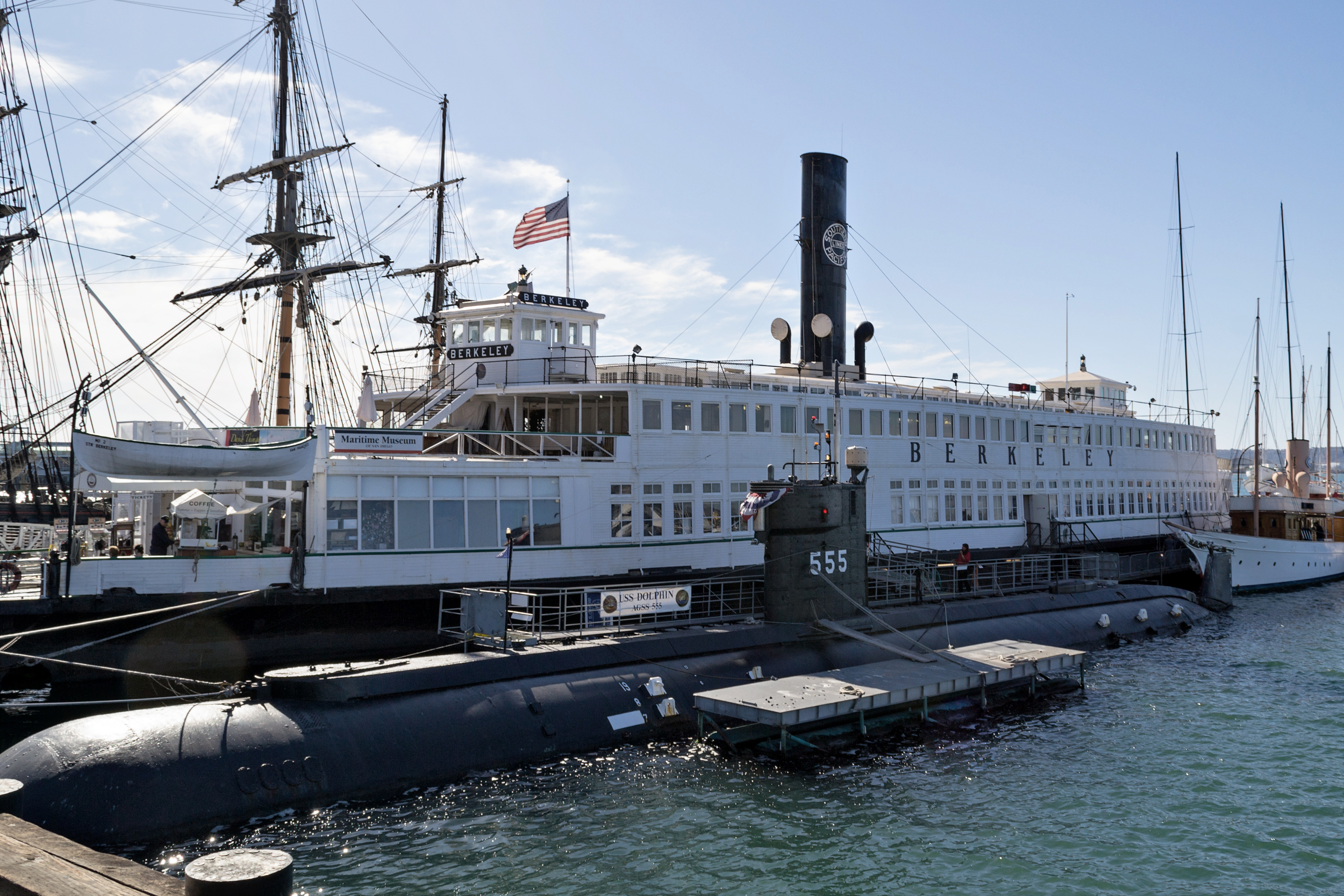
Ferry Berkeley (served 1898–1958) at the San Diego Maritime Museum

The first railroad ferries on San Francisco Bay were established by the San Francisco and Oakland Railroad and the San Francisco and Alameda Railroad (SF&A), which were taken over by the Central Pacific Railroad (CPRR) in 1870 to become an integral part of the First transcontinental railroad. The earliest railroad ferries ran from Oakland Point and from Alameda Terminal when Alameda was still a peninsula. The ferry pier at Oakland Point was greatly enlarged to form the Oakland Long Wharf. These railroad ferries mostly carried passengers, not trains, although there was some ferrying of freight cars to San Francisco. When the Central Pacific re-routed the Sacramento to Oakland segment of the Transcontinental Railroad in 1876, a ferry across the Carquinez Strait was established, and the world's largest ferryboat, the Solano was built (later joined by a sister ferry, the slightly larger Contra Costa), to serve the crossing. This railroad ferry actually carried whole trains up to 48 freight cars or 24 passenger cars with their locomotives. These ferries became part of the Southern Pacific Railroad (SP) when it assumed many of the facilities of its affiliate, the Central Pacific. These large train ferries were idled when a railway bridge was completed over the Carquinez Strait in November, 1930.

When trains reached Oakland, freight cars were loaded aboard ferries from Long Wharf on Oakland Point beginning in 1870. Freight car ferry loading switched to the Oakland Mole in 1881. After 1890 freight cars were delivered to the San Francisco Belt Railroad ferry slip at the foot of Lombard and East Streets. Belt Railroad tracks were later dual-gauged to also carry cars from the narrow gauge North and South Pacific Coast Railroads.

The Key System transit company established its own ferry service in 1903 between the Ferry Building in San Francisco and its own pier and wharf ("mole") on the Oakland shoreline, located just south of what is today the eastern approach to the San Francisco–Oakland Bay Bridge.

Ferries began serving north bay rail connections with the Petaluma and Haystack Railroad in 1864. San Francisco and North Pacific Railroad (SF&NP) and Petaluma and Santa Rosa Railroad (P&SR) ferries connected Petaluma River landing locations with San Francisco. North Pacific Coast Railroad (NPC) ferries connected Sausalito with San Francisco, and SF&NP ferries later sailed from Tiburon. Some of these ferries operated on Northwestern Pacific Railroad (NWP) schedules from 1907 to 1938.

The Napa Valley Railroad established service in 1865 and connected with ferry boat service in Vallejo, California. Monticello Steamship Company began operating ferries between Vallejo and San Francisco in 1895, and began coordinating with train schedules in 1905. Golden Gate Ferry Company gained control of Monticello in 1927 and, after merging with Southern Pacific, discontinued ferry service to Vallejo in 1937.

Sacramento Northern Railway used a ferry to cross the Sacramento and San Joaquin Rivers between Mallard and Chipps. Service began in 1912 with the wooden ferry Bridgit carrying six interurban cars. Bridgit burned in 1913 and was replaced by the steel ferry Ramon with the same car capacity.

Santa Fe and Western Pacific (WP) both ran passenger ferries connecting their east bay terminals to San Francisco; but both discontinued ferry service in 1933. Southern Pacific maintained a dominant position in Bay ferry service by gaining control of the South Pacific Coast Railroad (SPC) ferries in 1887, the Northwestern Pacific ferries in 1929, and the Petaluma and Santa Rosa ferries in 1932. After the San Francisco–Oakland Bay Bridge and Golden Gate Bridge opened in 1936 and 1937, Southern Pacific passenger ferry service was reduced to four routes: Ferry Building to Oakland Pier, Ferry Building to Alameda Pier, Hyde Street to Sausalito, and the Northwestern Pacific Ferry Building to Sausalito service. The route from Hyde Street to Sausalito was suspended in 1938 by order of the State Railroad Commission, the last ferry to Alameda ran in 1939, and the Ferry Building to Sausalito service ended February 1941. Many of the large passenger ferries were idled until World War II, when they were mobilized by the federal government to transport military personnel around the bay and shipyard workers from San Francisco to Marinship and Richmond Shipyards. The last Southern Pacific ferry ran between Oakland and San Francisco on July 29, 1958.

== Auto ferries (1909–1956) ==
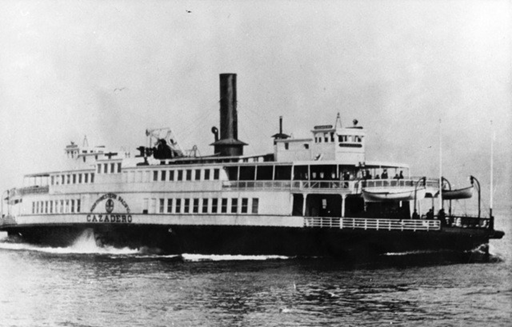
Ferry Cazadero in 1922

Although earlier ferries had carried teams and wagons, Melrose was launched in 1909 as the first San Francisco Bay ferry built with an unobstructed lower deck specifically intended for automobiles, and an upper deck for passengers. Southern Pacific ferries Melrose and Thoroughfare were designated to carry automobiles to and from San Francisco on the original Creek Route in 1911. Southern Pacific built new facilities to shift auto routing to the Oakland Pier in 1921 and purchased three new Six Minute ferries. In 1922, Golden Gate Ferry Company (GG) began transporting automobiles between Hyde Street Pier in San Francisco and Sausalito Ferry Terminal in Marin County. As of 2025, the Eureka ferry remains as a museum at the Hyde Street Pier. Southern Pacific purchased three more auto ferries with a ferry route linking San Francisco with a Richmond, California, connection to the Lincoln Highway in 1925. Golden Gate established another route between Hyde Street and Berkeley Pier in 1927. Southern Pacific built six diesel-electric ferries and gained control of Golden Gate's Golden-prefix ferries to form the subsidiary Southern Pacific-Golden Gate Company in 1929. Another auto ferry pier operated at the foot of Broadway. Southern Pacific-Golden Gate auto ferries ceased operation shortly after the San Francisco–Oakland Bay Bridge and Golden Gate Bridge opened. Most of the ferries were sold for use in Puget Sound, but a few were purchased by the Richmond-San Rafael Ferry Company to shuttle automobiles between Richmond and San Rafael. This last surviving auto ferry route ended when the Richmond–San Rafael Bridge opened in 1956.

== Cross-Bay air service (1914–1986) ==
In 1914, a short-lived seaplane ferry ran between San Francisco and Oakland. From 1930 to 1933, a more successful trans-Bay seaplane ferry was operated by Air Ferries Ltd. It ran from Pier 5 on the San Francisco waterfront to a shoreline barge docked at the foot of Franklin Street along the Oakland Estuary. It also operated between San Francisco and Vallejo. A fatal accident in 1933 put an end to the service.

During the 1960s, SFO Helicopter transported passengers to and from the San Francisco and Oakland airports from various locales around the bay, including the San Francisco waterfront and the Berkeley Marina. After ceasing operations in the 1970s it briefly resumed service in 1983 before going out of business in 1986.

== Rebirth of ferries (1959–present) ==
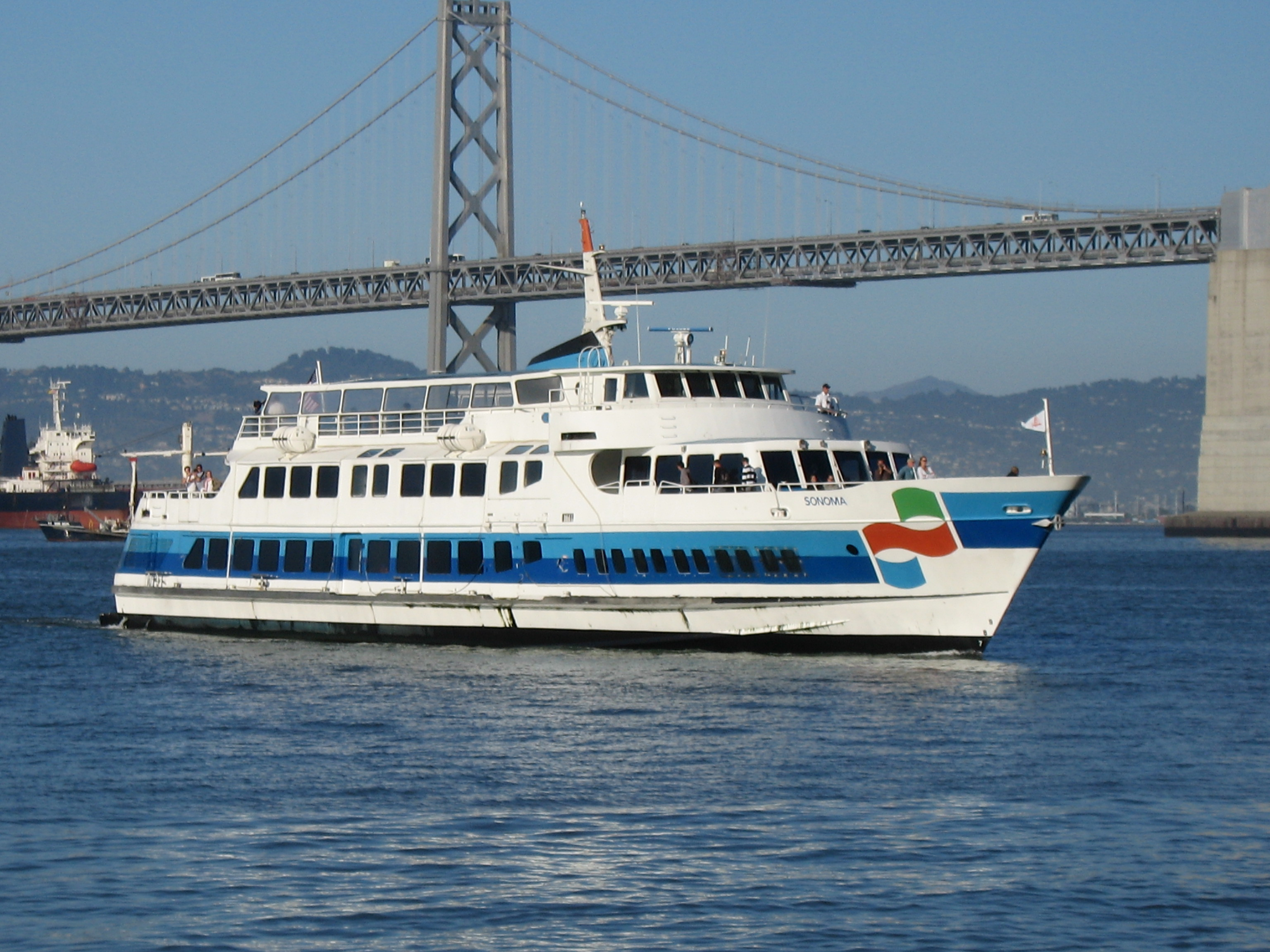
Golden Gate Ferry Sonoma, approaching the San Francisco Ferry Building in 2007

With the abandonment of the last railroad ferries, there was a brief period 1958–1962 with no commuter ferry service at all on the Bay (though tourist-oriented service to Angel Island began in 1959). In March 1962 Red & White Fleet, then known as Harbor Carriers, started commute-hour ferry service from Tiburon to the San Francisco Ferry Building. During a strike by Harbor Carriers employees in 1969, the Golden Gate Bridge, Highway and Transportation District chartered a boat to provide replacement service; the success of this experiment led the District to establish Golden Gate Ferry and begin operating service from Sausalito to the Ferry Building in 1970. Today Golden Gate Ferry operates modern high speed ferry service between San Francisco and four different landings in Marin County.

In 1973 Alcatraz Island opened to the public as a museum and ferry service from San Francisco began under a concession granted by the National Park Service.

The 1989 Loma Prieta earthquake caused a section of the Bay Bridge road deck to collapse, closing it to all traffic. In response, ferry service was quickly set up between piers in Oakland and Alameda and San Francisco (following almost the same path as the 19th-century "creek route" ferries). This service continued to operate with sponsorship from the City of Alameda and Port of Oakland after the bridge reopened the following month.

In 2011 the San Francisco Bay Area Water Emergency Transportation Authority (WETA) was set up to take over the Oakland/Alameda route and other routes between San Francisco and the East Bay, forming the San Francisco Bay Ferry system; over the following decade it added several additional routes. WETA contracts with the private Blue & Gold Fleet for the operation of these services. Blue & Gold additionally operates its own tourist-oriented ferry and sightseeing services; together these make the company the largest ferry transportation provider in the Bay Area as of 2022.

== Current ferry routes ==
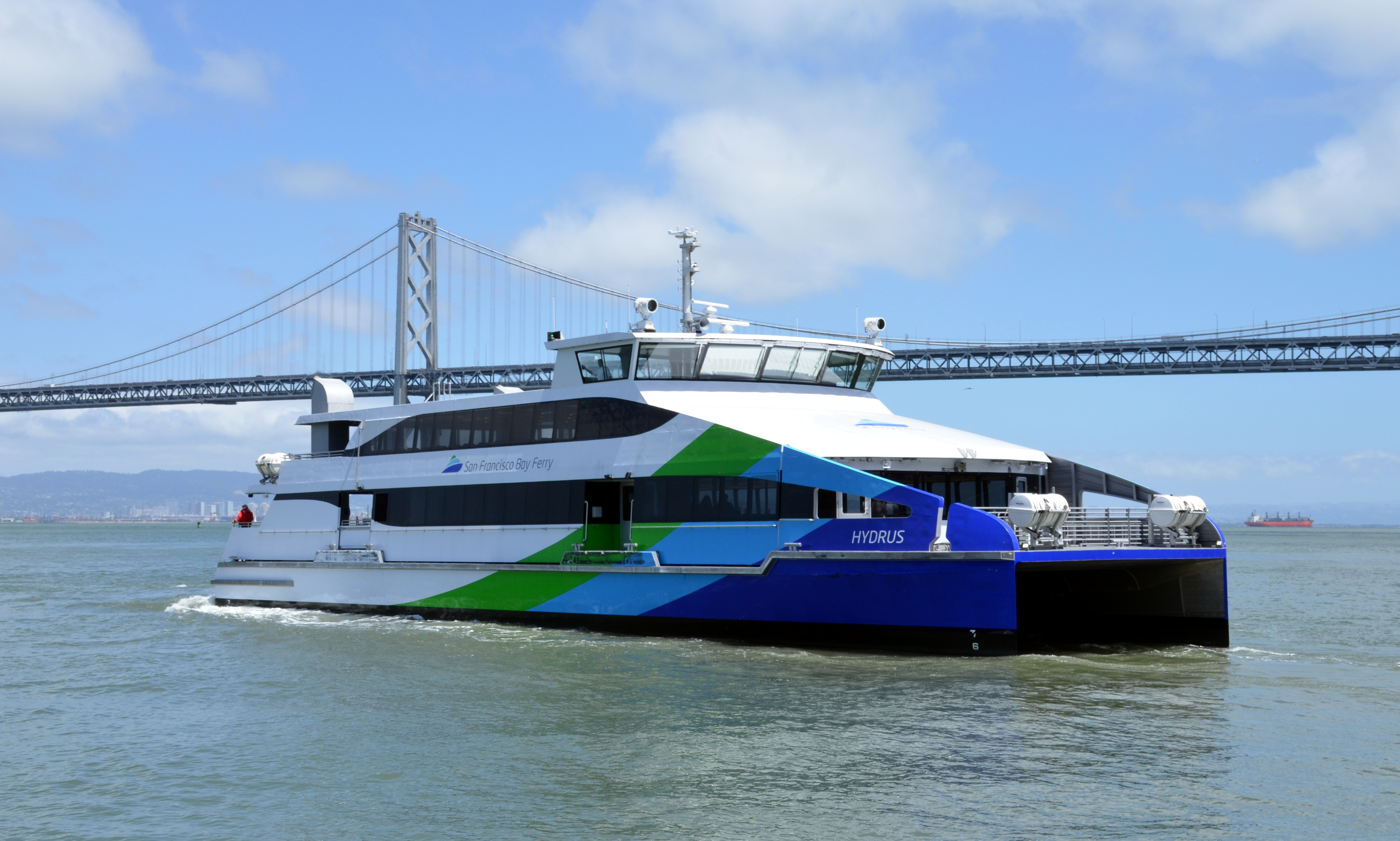
San Francisco Bay Ferry Hydrus in 2017

Terminals			Current operator	Year begun	Service notes
Sausalito	↔	San Francisco Ferry Building	Golden Gate Ferry	1970	
Sausalito	↔	San Francisco Pier 41	Blue & Gold Fleet	1982	Mid-day hours only
Tiburon	↔	San Francisco Ferry Building	Golden Gate Ferry	1962	
Angel Island	↔	San Francisco Ferry Building	Golden Gate Ferry	2021 (Note: Replaced service between Angel Island and Pier 41 provided by private operators since 1961)	
Angel Island	↔	Tiburon	Angel Island–Tiburon Ferry	1959	Weekend-only in winter
Larkspur	↔	San Francisco Ferry Building	Golden Gate Ferry	1976	
Mare Island and Vallejo	↔	San Francisco Ferry Building	San Francisco Bay Ferry	1986 (Note: Mare Island stop added 2017)	
Richmond	↔	San Francisco Ferry Building	San Francisco Bay Ferry	2019	
Treasure Island	↔	San Francisco Ferry Building	Prop SF	2022	
Alameda Main Street and Oakland Jack London Square	↔	San Francisco Ferry Building	San Francisco Bay Ferry	1989	
Alameda Main Street and Oakland Jack London Square	↔	South San Francisco	San Francisco Bay Ferry	2012	Weekday commute hours only
Alameda Seaplane Lagoon	↔	San Francisco Ferry Building	San Francisco Bay Ferry	2021	Weekdays only
Alameda Harbor Bay	↔	San Francisco Ferry Building	San Francisco Bay Ferry	1992	Weekdays only
San Francisco Pier 41	↔	San Francisco Ferry Building	San Francisco Bay Ferry	2021 (Note: Service between the Ferry Building and Pier 41 was previously provided as an extension of the Vallejo and Oakland/Alameda routes)	Weekends only
Alcatraz Island	↔	San Francisco Pier 33	Hornblower Cruises	1973	
Oakland Jack London Square (Broadway)	↔	Alameda Landing (Bohol Circle Immigrant Park)	Oakland Alameda Water Shuttle	2024	Tuesday-Sunday only

== Annual ridership ==
FY*	San Francisco Bay Ferry						Golden Gate Ferry		
FY*	Alameda/ Oakland	Harbor Bay	Richmond	South San Francisco	Vallejo/ Mare Island	Alameda Seaplane	Larkspur	Sausalito	Tiburon
2006–07	443,000	130,000	—	—	897,000	—	1,477,762	547,173	
2007–08	459,000	145,000	—	—	848,000	—	1,414,588	565,255	
2008–09	400,000	143,000	—	—	690,000	—	1,370,400	578,635	
2009–10	421,000	147,000	—	—	682,000	—	1,338,764	583,331	
2010–11	455,130	154,000	—	—	697,000	—	1,432,039	599,180	
2011–12	545,393	177,159	—	5,141	668,770	—	1,526,375	669,039	
2012–13	606,960	203,131	—	40,505	713,300	—	1,605,989	718,885	
2013–14	821,633	246,695	—	84,098	826,445	—	1,677,050	793,533	
2014–15	911,473	266,304	—	107,389	858,665	—	1,727,872	812,819	
2015–16	1,149,085	311,313	—	125,946	959,939	—	1,753,484	791,638	
2016–17	1,183,188	321,289	—	136,320	1,000,773	—	1,692,741	768,942	61,394
2017–18	1,311,041	332,283	—	144,735	1,056,342*	—	1,660,272	726,010	191,855
2018–19	1,384,300	355,713	84,576	142,749	1,081,665	—	1,644,783	629,954	195,467
2019–20	1,006,824	246,657	158,199	103,798	783,379	—	1,712,507	1,148,981	139,535
2020–21	102,482	—	24,688	137,328	—	—	89,861		
2021–22	479,196	113,207	158,986	24,075	484,686	145,786	690,362		

== Ferryboat roster ==
Passenger Ferry General Frisbiein in 1909

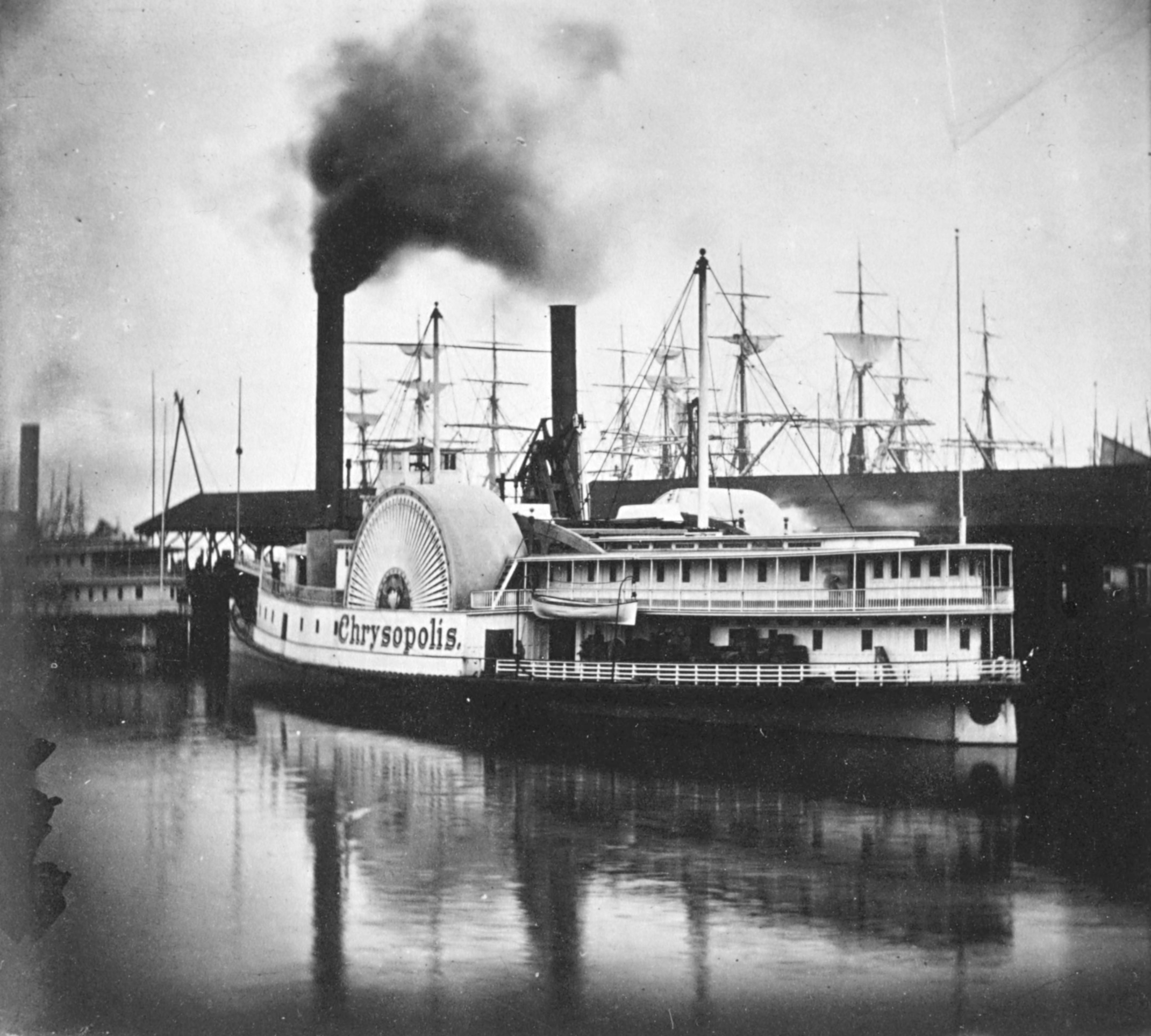
Passenger Ferry Oakland (as the Chrysopolis) ran from 1875 to 1940

=== Present ===
- Golden Gate (7 vessels)
  - Golden Gate (II)
  - Del Norte
  - Marin
  - Mendocino
  - Napa
  - San Francisco
  - Sonoma
- WETA (16 vessels)
  - Argo
  - Bay Breeze
  - Carina
  - Cetus
  - Dorado
  - Gemini
  - Hydrus
  - Intintoli
  - Lyra
  - Mare Island
  - Peralta
  - Pisces
  - Pyxis
  - Scorpio
  - Taurus
  - Vela
- Angel Island–Tiburon
  - Angel Island
  - Bonita
  - Tamalpais
- Blue & Gold (20+ vessels)
  - Golden Bear
  - Oski
  - Royal Star
  - Zelinsky
- Oakland Alameda Water Shuttle
  - Woodstock
- Red & White (5 vessels)
  - Enhydra
  - Harbor Princess
  - Harbor Queen
  - Royal Prince
  - Zalophus
- NWP
  - Ukiah

=== Past ===
==== Historical ferryboat table ====
Name	Operator	In service	Retired	Gross Tons	Length (feet)	Horse- power	Notes
Alameda	SF&A / CPRR / SP	1866	1898	813	193	350	side-wheel passenger ferry
Alameda	SP	1914	1943	2302	273	2500	side-wheel passenger ferry; sold to USN as YHB-25 after wartime shipyard service
Alvira	Davie	1889	1916	469	144	200	stern-wheel passenger ferry
Amador	CPRR / SP	1869	1904	985	199	300	side-wheel passenger ferry
Antelope	SF&NP	1871	1888	581	202		side-wheel passenger ferry built 1848
Bay City	SPC / SP	1878	1929	1283	230	800	side-wheel passenger ferry
Berkeley	SP	1898	1958	1945	261	1450	passenger ferry
Boston	Gray	1852	1852				
Bridgit	Sacramento Northern Railway	1912	1913		186		interurban car ferry
Caleb Cope	Gray	1852	1852				
Calistoga	Monticello / GG / SP	1907	1939	2680	298	2600	built as Florida; rebuilt as auto ferry in 1927; sold to USN as YFB-21
Capital	CPRR / SP	1876	1896	1989	277	900	side-wheel passenger ferry: Steamboat built in 1866 by John Gunder North for the California Steam Navigation Company; on the Sacramento – San Francisco run until 1876.
Cazadero	NS / NWP	1903	1941	1682	257	1600	converted to barge in 1941
City of Long Beach							
City of Sacramento	Monticello / GG / SP	1918	1941	3016	297	5900	auto ferry; sold to Puget Sound Navigation; requisitioned for wartime shipyard service to Richmond yard 2
Claremont	Key						
Clinton	Contra Costa / NPC	1853	1877	194	128	125	side-wheel passenger ferry; sunk in collision in 1877; built by Domingo Marcucci
Contra Costa	Contra Costa / SF&A / NPC	1857	1882	449	170	150	side-wheel passenger ferry, built by John G. North
Contra Costa	SP	1914	1930				Carquinez Strait train ferry
El Capitan	CPRR / SP	1868	1925	982	194	250	side-wheel passenger ferry
El Paso	SP / Richmond-San Rafael	1924	1956	1953	234	1400	auto ferry transferred from SP service in 1938
Encinal	SP	1888	1930	2014	245	1000	side-wheel passenger ferry
Erastus Corning	Brown	1852	1852				
Eureka	NWP / SP	1923	1957	2420	277	1500	Steam engine side-paddle ferry; Vessel originally built in 1890 as the railway ferry Ukiah with capacity for 10 freight cars; conversion to a passenger ferry began in 1922 & was completed in 1923; after being converted to passenger use, "Ukiah" was renamed "Eureka"; preserved at San Francisco Maritime National Historical Park
Feather River	WP	1913	1933	1578	218	2500	built as Edward T. Jeffery; sold to SP as Sierra Nevada in 1933
Fresno (now MV Willapa)	SP	1927	1940	2468	243	1800	diesel auto ferry
Garden City	SPC / SP	1879	1929	1080	208	625	side-wheel passenger ferry
USAT General Frank M. Coxe	United States Army	1922	1947	539	144		military personnel ferry
General Frisbie	Monticello	1901	1927				passenger ferry
General McPherson	United States Army	1867	1887	104			Fort Alcatraz ferry
General Sutter	Gray	1851	1852				
Gold	P&SR	1903	1920	334	140	200	stern-wheel passenger & freight ferry built in 1883; burned 8 November 1920
Gold	P&SR / NWP	1921	1935	317	155	150	stern-wheel passenger & freight ferry built as Fort Bragg in 1899
Golden Age	GG / SP	1928	1937	779	227	1200	diesel auto ferry
Golden Bear	GG / SP	1927	1937	779	227	1200	diesel auto ferry
Golden Coast	GG / SP	1903	1937	616	175	1200	auto ferry built as Yerba Buena; then Harry E. Speas
Golden Dawn	Key /GG / SP	1905	1937	612	180	2000	former Key System passenger ferry San Francisco rebuilt as auto ferry
Golden Era	Key / GG / SP	1908	1937	673	194	2000	former Key System passenger ferry Fernwood rebuilt as auto ferry
Golden Gate	GG / SP	1922	1937	598	207	1300	diesel auto ferry
Golden Poppy	GG / SP	1927	1937	779	227	1200	diesel auto ferry
Golden Shore	GG / SP	1927	1937	779	227	1200	diesel auto ferry
Golden State	GG / SP	1926	1937	780	227	1200	diesel auto ferry
Golden Way	Key / GG / SP	1907	1937	1138	189	2000	former Key System passenger ferry Claremont rebuilt as auto ferry
Golden West	GG / SP	1923	1937	594	214	1300	diesel auto ferry
Grace Barton	Whitney	1890	1916	194	100	60	stern-wheel passenger ferry
Hayward	Key		1945				requisitioned for wartime shipyard service
Hector	Gray	1852	1852				
James M. Donahue	SF&NP / NWP	1875	1921	730	228		side-wheel passenger ferry
Jenny Lind	Gray	1850	1853	61			Wrecked by an explosion on April 13, 1853.
Kangaroo	Gray	1851	1852				
Klamath	SP / Richmond–San Rafael	1924	1956	1952	234	1300	auto ferry transferred from SP service in 1938
Lagunitas	NS / NWP	1903	1921	767	280	400	stern-wheel freight car ferry (capacity 8 freight cars)
Las Plumas	WP	1957					diesel railcar ferry
Lake Tahoe	SP	1927	1940	2468	243	1800	diesel auto ferry
Louise	SF&O / CPRR	1870	1877	368	148	125	side-wheel passenger ferry
Mare Island	Berkeley	1870	1877	338	124	125	side-wheel passenger ferry
Marin	SF&NP / NWP	1909	1934	101	97		passenger ferry built as Requa and renamed after repairing fire damage in 1911
Melrose	SP	1909	1931	2662	273	1340	side-wheel auto ferry
Mendocino	NWP	1927	1939	2467	243	1800	diesel auto ferry
Napa Valley	Monticello / GG / SP	1910	1940	2185	231	2600	auto ferry
Newark	SPC / SP	1877	1923	1783	268	1200	side-wheel passenger ferry rebuilt as Sacramento in 1923
New Orleans	SP	1924	1938	1952	234	1400	auto ferry sold as Russian River in 1938
Oakland	San Antonio / Contra Costa / SF&O / CPRR	1859	1874	418		200	side-wheel passenger ferry
Oakland	CPRR / SP	1875	1940	1672	265	200	side-wheel passenger ferry built as a side-wheel steamboat Chrysopolis in 1860, by John G. North; rebuilt as a double ended ferry-boat in 1875 by Patrick Henry Tiernan; destroyed by fire in 1940.
Ocean Wave	Santa Fe	1901	1933				
Peralta		1857	1857				
Peralta	Key	1926	1933				passenger ferry; burned 6 May 1933
Petaluma	P&SR	1884	1914	264	135	250	stern-wheel passenger & freight ferry built as Resolute in 1884; burned 22 March 1914
Petaluma	P&SR / NWP	1914	1935	448	148	250	stern-wheel passenger & freight ferry built in 1914 using the engine of the burned ferry Petaluma
Piedmont	SP	1883	1940	1854	257	257	side-wheel passenger ferry
Ramon	Sacramento Northern	1913	1954			600	interurban car ferry
Ranger	Chipman & Aughinbaugh	1853	1854	29			passenger ferry destroyed by boiler explosion 8 January 1854
Red Jacket	Minturn	1852	1857				
Redwood Empire	NWP	1927	1939	2470	243	1800	diesel auto ferry
Rosalie	Davie	1893		318	137	350	passenger ferry
Russian River	Richmond-San Rafael	1938	1956	1952	234	1400	former auto ferry New Orleans purchased in 1938
Sacramento	SP	1923	1954	2254	268	1400	side-wheel passenger ferry rebuilt from Newark in 1923
San Antonio	San Antonio / Contra Costa / SF&O	1858	1871	659			side-wheel passenger ferry
San Jose	Key						
San Leandro	Key / SP	1923	1958	1653	225	1325	passenger ferry requisitioned for wartime shipyard service and then to United States Army
San Mateo	SP	1922	1940	1782	217	1400	auto ferry
San Pablo	Santa Fe	1900	1933	1535			passenger ferry
San Pedro	Santa Fe	1911	1933	1720			passenger ferry; became USN YFB-46
San Rafael	NPC	1877	1901	692	220		side-wheel passenger ferry sunk in collision in 1901
Santa Clara	SP	1915	1945	2282	273	2500	side-wheel passenger ferry requisitioned for wartime shipyard service to Marinship
Santa Rosa	NWP	1927	1939	2465	243	1800	diesel auto ferry
Saucelito	NPC	1877	1884	692	220		side-wheel passenger ferry burned at San Quentin in 1884
Sausalito	NPC / NS / NWP	1894	1932	1766	256	1200	side-wheel freight car and passenger ferry
Sehome	Monticello	1909	1918				passenger ferry built as stern-wheel Mountain Queen in 1877; rebuilt with side-wheel propulsion in 1889; rebuilt with propeller in 1914; sunk in collision with General Frisbie
Shasta	SP	1922	1940	1782	217	1400	auto ferry
Sierra Nevada	SP / Richmond–San Rafael	1933	1956	1578	218	2500	formerly WP passenger ferry Feather River purchased 1933; requisitioned for wartime shipyard service to Richmond yard 1; converted to auto ferry when sold by SP in 1947
Solano	CPRR / SP	1879	1930		484		Carquinez Strait train ferry
Sophie MacLane	SF&A	1858	1864	242	148		side-wheel passenger ferry
Stockton	SP	1927	1940	2467	243	1800	diesel auto ferry
Tamalpais	NPC	1857	1900	365	150		side-wheel passenger ferry built as Petaluma of Saucelito
Tamalpais	NPC / NS / NWP	1901	1941	1631	245	1800	side-wheel passenger ferry; sold to USN in 1941 as floating barracks at Mare Island
Telephone	WP	1912	1913				
Thoroughfare	CPRR / SP	1871	1909	1012	248	400	side-wheel freight car ferry (capacity 18 cars)
Thoroughfare	SP	1912	1935	2604	273	1300	side-wheel auto ferry
Tiburon	SF&NP / NWP	1884	1925	1248	240		side-wheel passenger ferry
Transit	CPRR / SP	1875	1934	1566	314	500	side-wheel freight car ferry (capacity 20 cars)
Washoe	SF&O / CPRR	1864	1878	580		250	side-wheel passenger ferry
Yerba Buena	Key						requisitioned for wartime shipyard service to Richmond yard 3 and then to United States Army
Yosemite	SP	1923	1939	1782	217	1400	auto ferry

==== Relocated ferryboats ====
Several ferries that had seen service on San Francisco Bay were relocated after the bay bridges were built. Yosemite was sold to the Argentina-Uruguayan Navigation Touring Company, renamed Argentina, and served a route crossing the Rio de la Plata. Seventeen were purchased by the Puget Sound Navigation Company:

- City of Sacramento
- Fresno (renamed Willapa)
- Golden Age (renamed Klahanie)
- Golden Bear
- Golden Dawn
- Golden Poppy (renamed Chetzemoka)
- Golden Shore (renamed Elwha)
- Golden State (renamed Kehloken)
- Golden West
- Lake Tahoe (renamed Illahee)
- Mendocino (renamed Nisqually)
- Napa Valley (renamed Malahat)
- Peralta (renamed Kalakala)
- Redwood Empire (renamed Quinault)
- San Mateo
- Santa Rosa (renamed Enetai)
- Shasta
- Stockton (renamed Klickitat)

Golden West was promptly resold to San Diego and renamed North Island for service between San Diego and Coronado. Golden Bear was salvaged for parts after being damaged when a towline parted off the Oregon coast on 15 November 1937. The others went on to serve in the waters of northwestern Washington and southwestern British Columbia. After serving seven years as Elwha, Golden Shore was sold to San Diego in 1944 and renamed Silver Strand on the San Diego–Coronado route. The City of Sacramento operated on the Seattle-Bremerton route in the 1940s, then on the Horseshoe Bay–Nanaimo route from 1952 to 1963 as the MV Kahloke, and finally on the Horseshoe Bay–Langdale route from 1964 to 1976 as the MV Langdale Queen. The Peralta, rebuilt as the MV Kalakala, operated on various Puget Sound crossings and on the Seattle–Victoria–Port Angeles route. The City of Long Beach, renamed the City of Angeles, operated out of Port Angeles and the Stockton, which became the Klickitat, operated on the Keystone–Port Townsend route until 2007. Mendocino (renamed Quinault) and Redwood Empire (renamed Nisqually) were retired in 2003 and scrapped in 2009. Santa Rosa was renamed Enetai, returned to San Francisco Bay in 1968, and is preserved at Pier 3.
