= Melrose =

Melrose may refer to:

== Places ==
=== United Kingdom ===
- Melrose, Scottish Borders, a town in the Scottish Borders, Scotland
  - Melrose Abbey, ruined monastery
  - Melrose RFC, rugby club

=== Australia ===
- Melrose, Queensland, a locality in the South Burnett Region
- Melrose, Queensland (Southern Downs Region), a neighbourhood in Killarney
- Melrose, South Australia, a town in the southern Flinders Ranges
- Melrose, Tasmania, a locality in the North-West Region
- Melrose Park, South Australia, a suburb of Adelaide

=== Canada ===
- Melrose, Hastings County, Ontario, a community in the township of Tyendinaga
- Melrose, Middlesex County, Ontario, a community in the township of Middlesex Centre
- Melrose, Nova Scotia
- Melrose, New Brunswick
- Melrose, Newfoundland and Labrador
- Melrose, Nova Scotia

=== New Zealand ===
- Melrose, New Zealand, a suburb in the Eastern Ward of Wellington City

=== South Africa ===
- Melrose, Gauteng, a suburb of Johannesburg
- Melrose Estate, Gauteng, a suburb of Johannesburg
- Melrose House, historic mansion in Pretoria
- Melrose North, Gauteng, a suburb of Johannesburg

=== United States ===
- Melrose Avenue, a major street running through Los Angeles and West Hollywood, California
- Melrose District, a neighborhood in Phoenix, Arizona on the border of the Encanto and Alhambra urban villages.
- Melrose, Oakland, California
- Melrose, California, former name of Cherokee, Nevada County, California
- Melrose, Connecticut, a village in East Windsor
- Melrose, Florida, an unincorporated town
- Melrose, Iowa, a city
- Melrose, Louisiana, a village
  - Melrose Plantation, a plantation in Natchitoches, Louisiana
- Melrose, Maryland, an unincorporated community
- Melrose, Massachusetts, a city located in the Greater Boston metropolitan area
- Melrose, Minnesota, a city
- Melrose, New Jersey, an unincorporated community
- Melrose, New Mexico, a village
- Melrose, New York, a hamlet of the Town of Schaghticoke
- Melrose, Bronx, a residential neighborhood in the New York City borough of the Bronx
  - Melrose (Metro-North station)
- Melrose, Ohio, a village
- Melrose-Rugby, Roanoke, Virginia, a neighborhood in central Roanoke
- Melrose, Wisconsin, a village
- Melrose (town), Wisconsin, a town
- Melrose Township (disambiguation)

Registered historic places:

- Melrose (Danville, Kentucky) in listed on the NRHP in Boyle County, Kentucky
- Melrose (Natchez, Mississippi), a mansion in Natchez National Historical Park
- Melrose (Murfreesboro, North Carolina) in listed on the NRHP in Hertford County, North Carolina
- Melrose (Cheyney, Pennsylvania) in Cheyney, Pennsylvania
- Melrose (Casanova, Virginia), listed on the NRHP in Fauquier County, Virginia
- Melrose (Fork Union, Virginia), listed on the NRHP in Fluvanna County, Virginia

== Other uses ==
- Melrose (name)
- Melrose Industries, a British investment company
- Melrose (apple), an apple cultivar
- Melrose (ferry), a San Francisco Bay ferry operating from 1909 to 1931
- Melrose (store), a clothing store in the Southwest United States
- Melrose (album), a 1990 album by Tangerine Dream

== See also ==
- Chronicle of Melrose, a medieval chronicle likely written by monks at Melrose Abbey
- Melrose Apartments (disambiguation),
- Melrose High School (disambiguation)
- Melrose Park (disambiguation)
- Melrose Place, a 1990s TV soap opera
