= Melrose Park =

Melrose Park may refer to:

== Places ==
=== Australia ===
- Melrose Park, New South Wales
- Melrose Park, South Australia

=== United States ===
- Melrose Park (Fort Lauderdale), Florida
- Melrose Park, Illinois
- Melrose Park, Lexington, Kentucky
- Melrose Park, New York
- Melrose Park, Pennsylvania

== Transportation ==
- Melrose Park station (Illinois), a Metra train station in Melrose Park, Illinois
- Melrose Park station (SEPTA), a SEPTA Regional Rail station in Melrose Park, Pennsylvania

== See also ==
- Melrose (disambiguation)
