= Washoe (steamboat) =

Boilers exploded 1864 in California

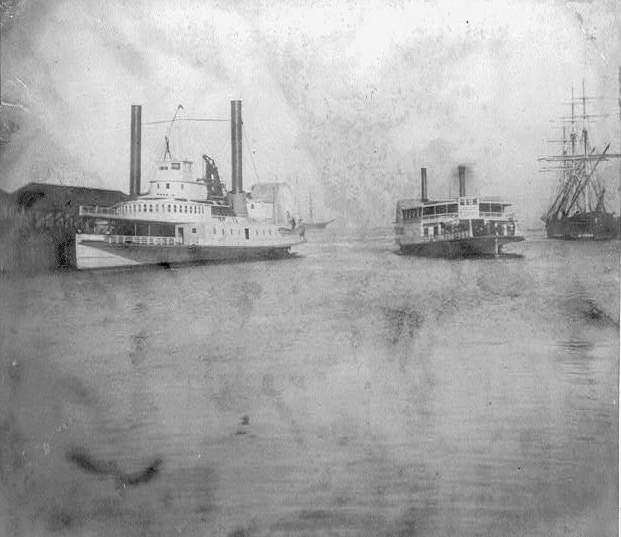
Steamer Washoe (on left, at dock) and Oakland ferry. One-half of stereograph, publisher's number 303 c. 1866

Washoe was an 1864 steamboat of the Sacramento River watershed in California, United States.

== History ==
Washoe suffered a catastrophic boiler explosion six months after she was launched. She was heading upriver from San Francisco to Sacramento when the boilers blew near Steamboat Slough, about 12 miles (19 km) north of Rio Vista. The explosion of 9 p.m. on September 5, 1864, resulted in 54 confirmed deaths and 67 missing passengers. Other accounts have the confirmed death toll from 70 to more than 80. The history of Sacramento County published in 1890 pegs the death toll at close to 90. According to the New York Times, "the engineer said before he died that the cause of the explosion was rotten iron in the boiler." According to another report, Washoe was racing Chrysopolis at the time of the explosion. Mark Twain was a news writer for the San Francisco Call at the time and wrote up the newspaper's mournful coverage of the tragedy. Owner Captain Kidd had her salvaged and restored and she steamed again until 1878 when a catastrophic fire put her out of service for good.

== See also ==
- Yosemite (sidewheeler) § Service in California
