= Yosemite (sidewheeler) =

American paddle steam bost

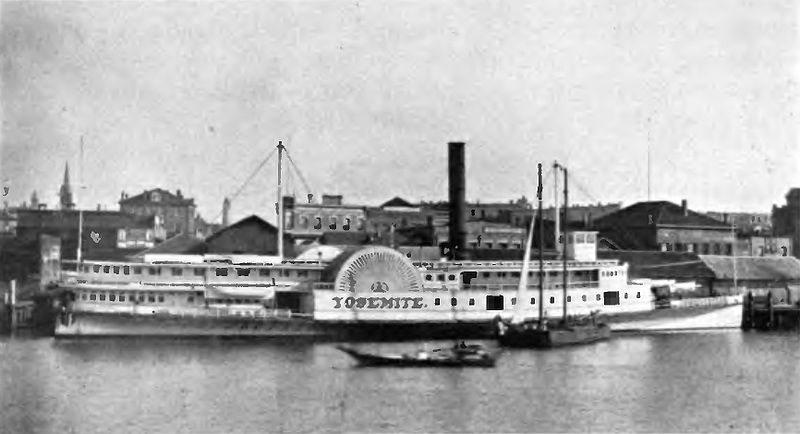
- Yosemite, sometime before 1895

History
- Name: Yosemite
- Builder: John Gunder North, in San Francisco
- Launched: 1862
- Fate: Wrecked on July 9, 1909 at Port Orchard Narrows

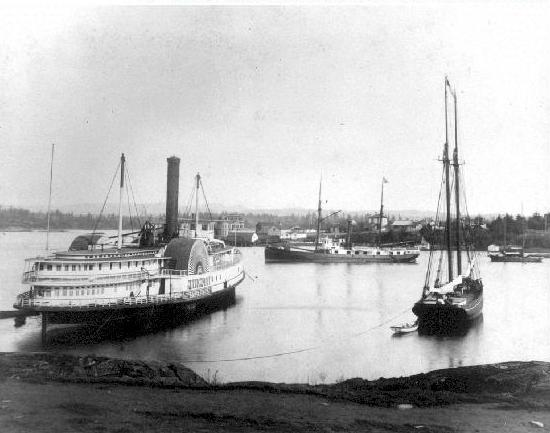
Yosemite on the left in Victoria Harbour in the 1890s. The enormous beam of the vessel, made necessary by the sidewheels, is readily apparent, as well as the extensive ornamentation of the all-wooden vessel.

The steamboat Yosemite operated for almost fifty years on San Francisco Bay, the Sacramento River, inland coastal waters and the lower Fraser River in British Columbia, and Puget Sound.

== Design ==
Yosemite was built in 1862 at the yard of John Gunder North, in San Francisco. For a vessel built entirely of wood, Yosemite was enormous. She was 282' long after her rebuild following the 1865 boiler explosion, when 30' was added to her length., 35' beam (80' over the paddle guards) and 13' depth of hold, and rated at 1525 tons. She was a side-wheel steamer built entirely of wood with a single-cylinder "walking-beam" steam engine with a 57" bore and a 122" stroke. Another source gives slightly different dimensions: 283.2' long, 34.8' on the beam, 13.6' depth of hold, and 1,319 tons. Her paddle wheels were 32' in diameter and fitted with 10' long "buckets" (the maritime world for the wooden planks fitted to the wheel that acted as paddles) Turner, one of the most prominent Pacific Northwest maritime historians, described Yosemite as follows:

The Yosemite was a beautiful ship, with broad spacious decks and ample cabin, dining and lounge space. She was also powerful and fast, although somewhat unstable in exposed water during rough weather.

== Service in California ==
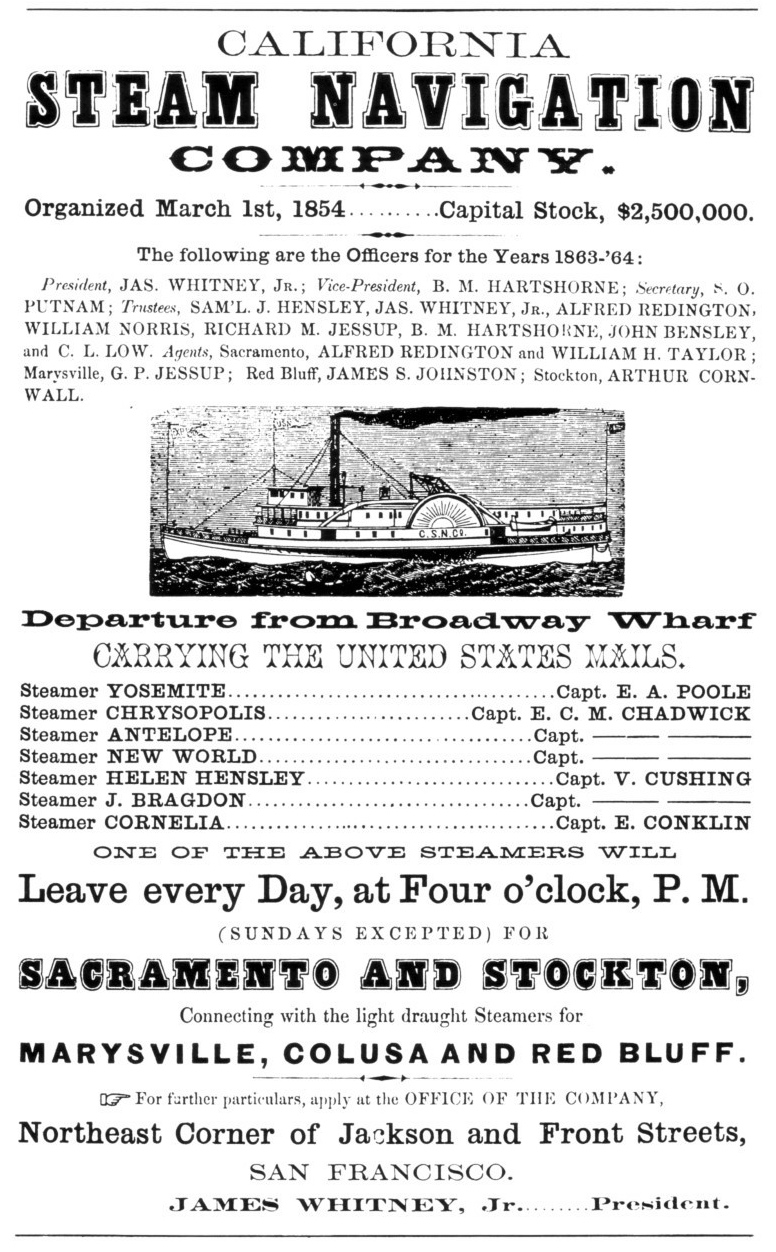
California Steam Navigation poster 1863

Yosemite was first placed in service by the California Steam Navigation Company in 1863 to run with Chrysopolis on the Sacramento River. Daily service, Sundays excepted, was provided from San Francisco leaving at 4pm for Sacramento.

On October 12, 1865, as she was leaving the Rio Vista landing bound down river, her boiler (supposedly a safer "low-pressure" model) exploded, killing 58 people and scalding and injuring many more. Four days after the explosion some 25 to 30 people were missing in addition to the enumerated dead and wounded. According to a news account, "Abaft the wheelhouses no damage whatever was done, the exploding boilers lifting forward and upward, but filling the forecastle, called the Chinese saloon, with steam sufficient to kill the 30 Chinese therein instantly." Two deckhands who survived the explosions then looted the bodies—they were found in possession of multiple watches, gold dust, and a great deal of cash, "most of the money being in cloth packages marked with Chinese characters." Four employees of Maguire's Opera House were killed, and a newly elected California state senator from Amador County, G. W. Seaton, was among the dead. J. W. Haskin, a former state senator from Mono County, was "blown into the river and swam to the opposite shore." The Chinese immigrants killed on the Yosemite were buried at Rio Vista. As of 1960, there were plans to redevelop the "potter's field" where they were buried into a historic site and park.

She was equipped with new boilers then, and once again in 1876, after which she could reach a speed of 17 miles (27 km) an hour. Railroad competition in California forced her to be laid up at Oakland from 1879 to 1883.

== Purchase by Canadian Pacific Navigation Company ==
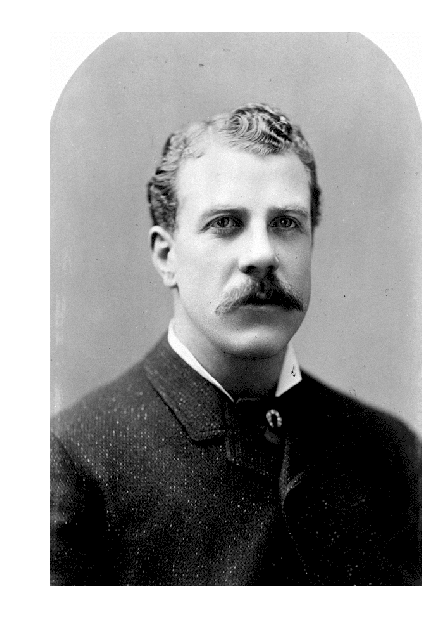
Commodore John Irving, who bought Yosemite for the Canadian Pacific Navigation Company

In 1883, John Irving Commodore of the Canadian Pacific Navigation Company, bought Yosemite from her then owners, the Central Pacific Railroad and brought her up to Vancouver to be one of the first vessels of the line.

=== Canadian operations ===
Yosemite proved to be a good purchase for Commodore Irving. Despite her reputation arising from the 1865 boiler explosion, Yosemite ran in Canadian waters for many years without significant trouble. In 1883, she set a speed record of four hours and 20 minutes for the 72-nautical-mile (133 km) run from Vancouver to Victoria, which stood until 1901, when the transpacific liner Moana made the run in four hours and one minute. In those times, ships were subject to health quarantines, in particular for smallpox. Officials were sometimes too quick to declare a smallpox quarantine, which happened twice in July 1892 to Yosemite. Twice she was barred at Vancouver from landing passengers coming from Victoria and each time she simply landed them further up Burrard Inlet. Court action was necessary to persuade the Vancouver officials to allow Yosemite to land in their city.

=== Purchase by Canadian Pacific Railway ===
In 1901, the Canadian Pacific Railway purchased all the steamship operations and vessels of the Canadian Pacific Navigation Company, including Yosemite, which with other older steamers of the line was placed in reserve to fill in for newer ships taken out for service, and to cover times of high traffic such as in the summer months. By this time, Yosemite was almost 40 years old.

== Sale to Puget Sound excursion lines ==
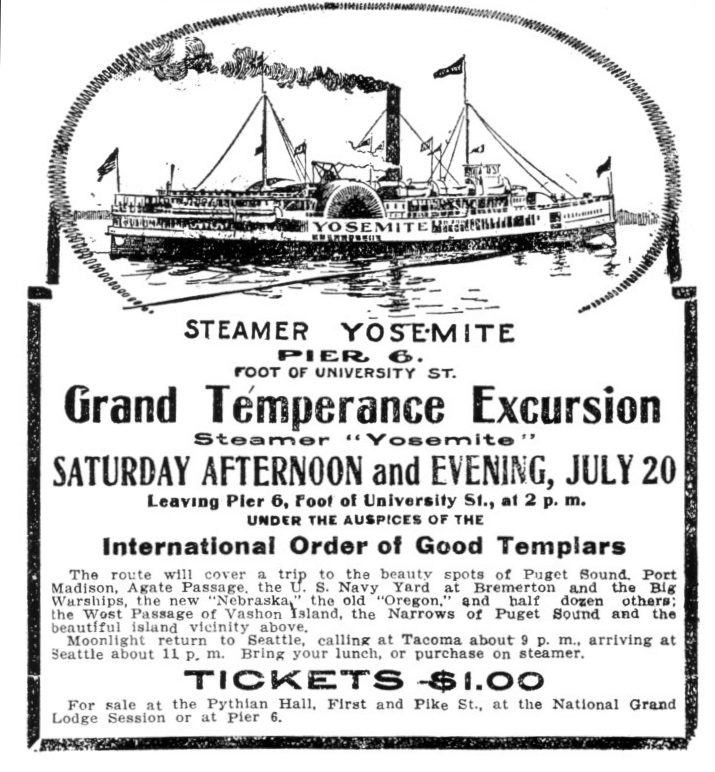
Advertisement for excursion on Yosemite

In 1906, the Canadian Pacific Railway sold Yosemite to the Puget Sound Excursion Company. This company had been organized by Capt. Thomas Grant to run cruises and excursions out of Seattle in connection with the Alaska–Yukon–Pacific Exposition. Once in Seattle, Yosemite was rebuilt somewhat by John B. Mitchell. The main deck and social hall were extended all the way forward to be flush with the bow, and a large dancing pavilion was installed.

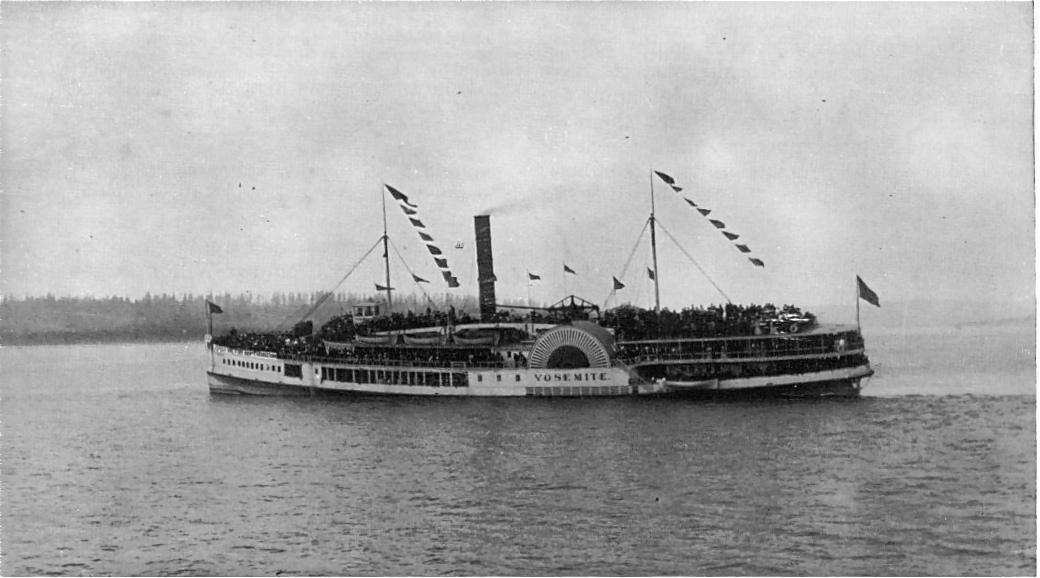
1908 University of Washington excursion on Yosemite to view Great White Fleet.

By the spring of 1907, Yosemite was in operation under command of Captain Grant, carrying up to 1,000 passengers at a time from Seattle to Bremerton and around Bainbridge Island. Music was provided by Wagner's Band and food service by Lord and Meeks, a well-known Seattle catering firm.

The surviving photographs of Yosemite seem to always show an astounding number of people on her decks. This was in spite of the then recent loss of the General Slocum in New York, also a wooden sidewheeler, in which over 1,000 people had been killed in a fire, and the resulting threat by the Puget Sound steamboat inspectors to strictly enforce the limits on passengers that could be embarked on excursions and cruises.

Among other trips, in 1908, Yosemite carried almost the entire student body of the University of Washington out into Puget Sound to greet the Great White Fleet. In this particular trip, the vessel was obviously grossly overloaded, as the weight of the passengers caused her to heel so sharply over to port that the water came up to the bottom of the port side paddle wheel guard.

Boxing matches were held on her lower deck. Perhaps somewhat incongruously with hosting boxing matches, Yosemite on July 20, 1907, or 1908, advertised a "Grand Temperance Excursion" tickets $1.00 each "under the auspices of the International Order of Good Templars":

The route will cover a trip to the beauty spots of Puget Sound, Port Madison, Agate Passage, etc., the U.S. Navy Yard at Bremerton and the Big Warships, the new "Nebraska," the old "Oregon," and half dozen others; the West Passage of Vashon Island, the Narrows of Puget Sound and the beautiful island vicinity above.

Another typical charter excursion was carrying the Georgetown Volunteer Fire Department, who were all employees of the Rainier Brewery. In one atypical incident, in August, 1907, Yosemite rammed 30 feet (9.1 m) into a dock in Seattle, knocking over a horse and wagon, apparently becoming the only paddlewheeler to collide with a harnessed horse.

== Wrecked ==
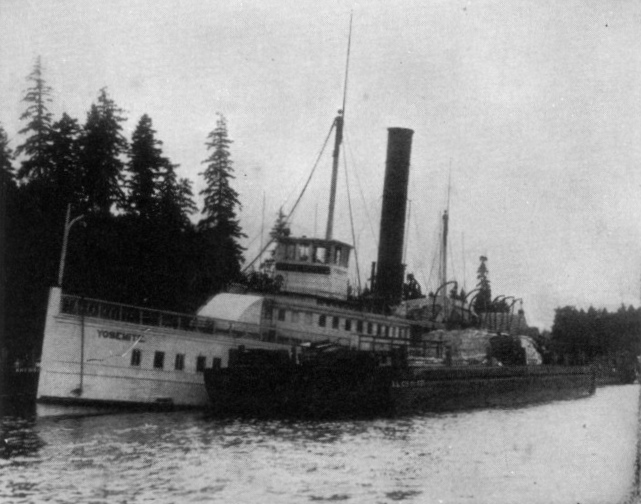
Yosemite wrecked with salvage barge alongside

Yosemite was wrecked on July 9, 1909, at Port Orchard Narrows, in broad daylight. The circumstances of the wreck were never entirely cleared up. As she approached Bremerton through the narrows at about 6:20 p.m., with Capt. Mike Edwards in command, she suddenly veered sharply towards the shore at about 14 miles per hour (23 km/h). Striking ground, her back was broken and she was a total loss. The captain said he expected the current to strike her differently than it did. Although there were over 1,000 people on board, no one was killed or drowned, with the passengers and crew being taken on board the steamer Transport, the first on the scene, with Inland Flyer and Norwood standing by.

Yosemite had recently been sold to real estate promoter C. D. Hillman. He later was sent to prison, and this gave rise to talk and accusations that she had been wrecked recklessly or even deliberately for insurance. This doesn't seem to square with the facts, as it would have required the collusion not only of her master, but also the pilot and two quartermasters who struggled to hold the ship on course, and strong tidal currents had wrecked and continue to wreck vessels.

== See also ==
- Washoe (steamboat)
