= John Gunder North =

Norwegian Shipbuilder

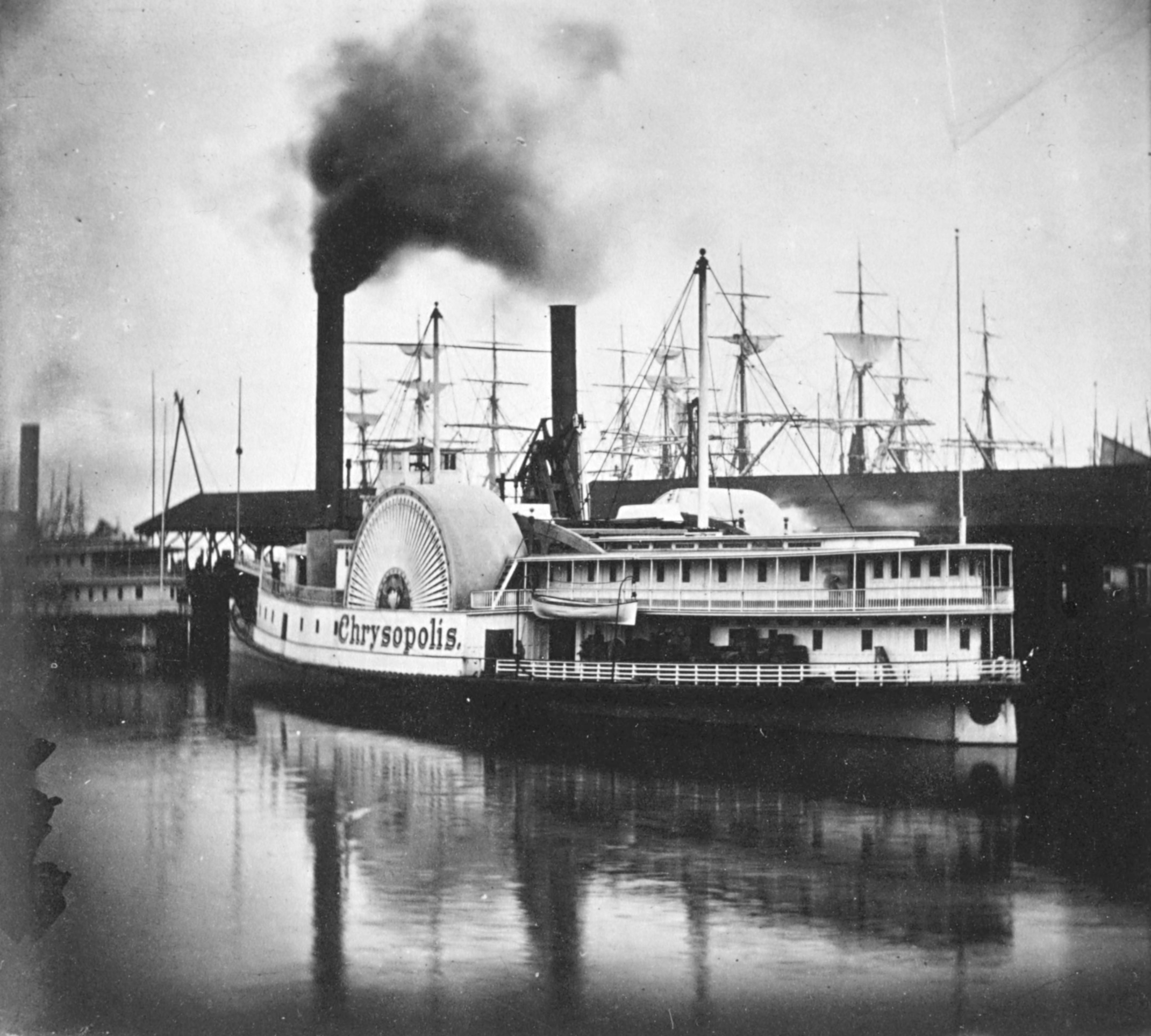
Chrysopolis, one of the first steamboats built at North's Shipyard, ran on San Francisco Bay and the Sacramento River from 1860 to 1875. It holds the record for the fastest passage by a steamboat between Sacramento and San Francisco.

John Gunder North (December 15, 1826 – September 19, 1872) was a Norwegian born ship builder in San Francisco. During his career, he built 273 hulls of all kinds with 53 bay and river steamers, including the famed paddle steamers Chrysopolis, Yosemite and Capital.

== Early life ==
John G. North was born Johan Gurenius Nordtvedt in Trondheim, Norway. Becoming a shipbuilder for the Norwegian government, he built twenty gunboats for the Royal Norwegian Navy. He was then given a subsidy to study American shipbuilding techniques and came to Philadelphia in July 1848. After visiting and working in shipyards in New York City, Boston, Portland and New Orleans, North decided to stay in the United States, and came by sea as a ships officer to San Francisco, California on July 28, 1850. He visited the mines for a short time, then returned to San Francisco to partner with Captain William H. Moore in a small steamboat beginning a firm that later became part of the California Steam Navigation Company. After acquiring enough money from the steamboat business by 1853 North returned to being a shipbuilder.

== Shipbuilding in California ==
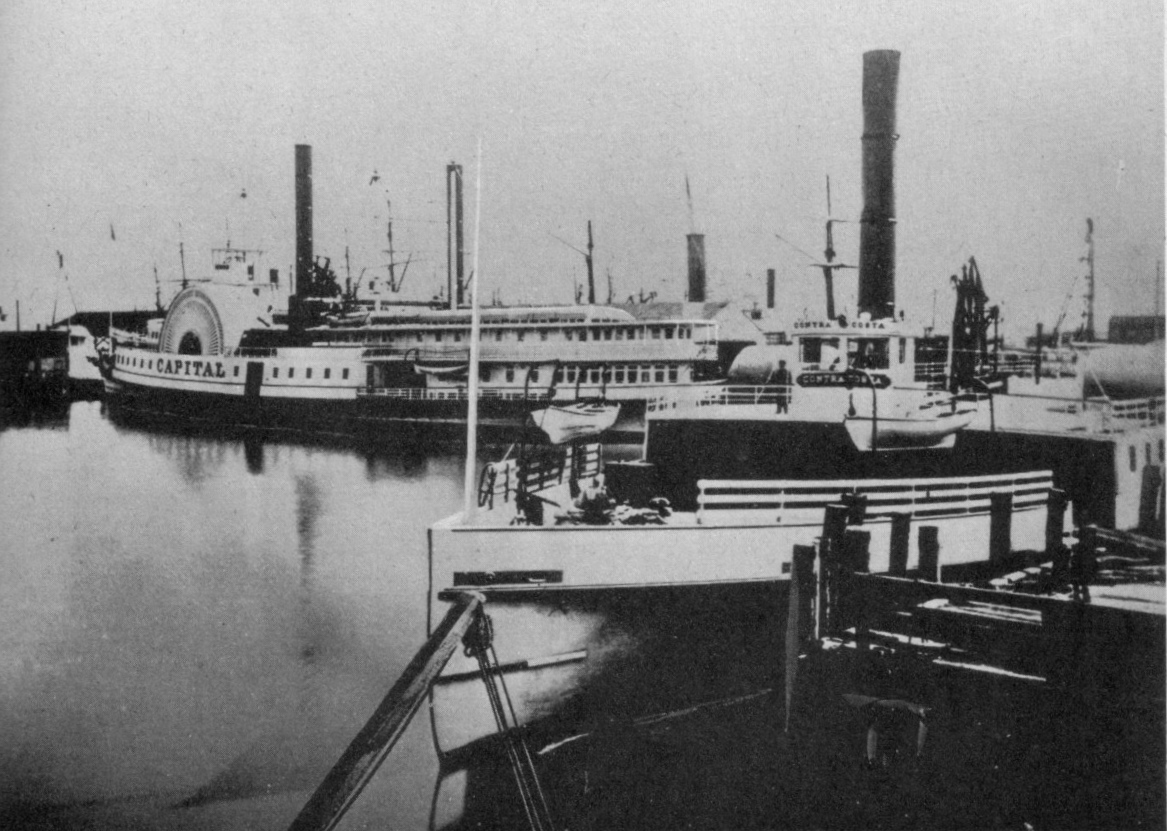
Sidewheelers Capital and Contra Costa (a ferry), both built by North, at the Davis Street Landing in San Francisco, circa 1870.

In 1854, North opened his first boatyard at Steamboat Point on the shore of the lagoon called Mission Bay on the south side of what is now Townsend Street, between Third and Fourth Streets, in what is now the Mission Bay neighborhood of San Francisco.

In 1855, North built the Colorado, a 120 food long, stern-wheel steamboat, for the George A. Johnson & Company in San Francisco. It was equipped with an 80-horsepower steam engine capable of carrying up to 70 tons of cargo while drawing only 2 feet of water. North subsequently disassembled and shipped in sections by sea to the estuary of the Colorado River. There North unloaded, reassembled and launched in it in December, 1855. It was the first stern-wheel steamboat put on that river.

In 1857, North built the 449 ton, 170 foot long, single end, side-wheel, ferry steamer Contra Costa for Charles Minturn, owner of the Contra Costa Steam Navigation Company, largest ferry company in San Francisco Bay at that time.

In 1860, North left his old boatyard and opened North's Shipyard in San Francisco's Potrero District to the south on the Bay. One of the first ships built there was the Chrysopolis for California Steam Navigation Company, which would set the fastest time for a steamboat between Sacramento and San Francisco. In 1862 he built the Yosemite to run with Chrysopolis on the Sacramento River for the same company. That same year he also built the Colorado II to replace the Colorado for the George A. Johnson & Company. Again bringing it by sea to the river mouth but reassembling it up river at Arizona City under the guns of Fort Yuma, for fear of Confederate raiders. In 1864 he built the Mohave for the same company, assembling it again in the estuary.

In 1866, North built the 1,989 ton, 277 foot long Capital, the last side-wheel steamer built for the California Steam Navigation Company. Capital, largest of the steamboats on the rivers in California, remained on the water under various owners until 1896.

In 1869, he built the 294 ton, 154 foot long, side-wheel steamer, Parthenius, that provided passenger and mail service to the major landings of Contra Costa County for many years.

== Later career and death ==
North subsequently sold North's Shipyard and left to visit Norway. In Norway, he built a steamship for its government. Subsequently, he visited shipyards and iron works in Great Britain, Germany, Italy and other places in Europe and was at the opening of the Suez Canal in Egypt before returning to San Francisco after a three-year absence. Following a trip to Guatemala where he built two steamboats for the Honduras Railroad Company, he contracted a tropical disease. North returned to San Francisco where he died a week later on September 19, 1872. He was buried in the Cypress Lawn Memorial Park at Colma in San Mateo County, California.

== See also ==
- Ferries of San Francisco Bay
