= Clinton (steam ferry) =

American passenger boat on San Francisco Bay (1853–1877)

History
- Name: Clinton
- Operator: Conta Costa Steam Navigation Company; San Rafael & San Quentin Railroad
- Route: Creek Route
- Builder: Domingo Marcucci
- Completed: 1853
- Fate: Sank after collision in 1877

General characteristics
- Type: Ferry
- Tonnage: 194 GRT
- Length: 120 ft (37 m)
- Beam: 24 ft (7.3 m)
- Depth: 7 ft (2.1 m)
- Installed power: 125 hp (93 kW) low-pressure engine
- Propulsion: Two sidewheels

Clinton was the first steam ferry built in California and used on San Francisco Bay in 1853.

== History ==
Clinton was built by Domingo Marcucci in early 1853, for Charles Minturn of the Conta Costa Steam Navigation Company. She was a 194-ton, side-wheel steamer, with a walking beam and powered by a 125-horsepower (93 kW), low-pressure engine. The vessel was 120 feet (37 m) long, with a 24-foot (7.3 m) beam and a hull 7 feet (2.1 m) deep. She was launched 60 days from the day her keel was laid.

She ran on the Creek Route between San Francisco and the eastern shore until 1865 when Minturn sold out his interest in the Creek Route to the railroad. In 1866, he moved the remains of his fleet to operate between San Francisco and Marin and Sonoma Counties.

In 1874, Clinton was purchased by the San Rafael & San Quentin Railroad and put on the run to San Rafael. Clinton ended her career in 1877, sinking after a collision with another ship.
