= SS Asbury Park =

1903 steamship

- Asbury Park as City of Sacramento

History
- Name: Asbury Park later City of Sacramento, Kahloke, Lady Grace
- Route: San Francisco Bay, Puget Sound. British Columbia
- Builder: Wm Cramp & Sons
- Launched: 28 March 1903
- In service: 1903
- Identification: US registry #107848; IMO number: 5203255
- Notes: Transferred to west coast, 1918.

General characteristics
- Type: coastal steamship and ferry
- Tonnage: as ferry : 3,016 gross; 1,829 regis.
- Length: 297 ft (91 m)
- Beam: as ferry : 50 ft (15 m) over hull; 67 ft (20 m) over guards.
- Depth: 15.5 ft (5 m) depth of hold
- Deck clearance: as ferry : 11.5 ft (4 m) on vehicle deck.
- Ramps: as ferry : bow loading ramp for vehicles
- Installed power: steam engines; converted to diesel-electric power 1952-53.
- Propulsion: twin propellers
- Speed: as built : 20 kn (37.04 km/h)
- Crew: as steamship : 77

Asbury Park was a high-speed coastal steamer built in Philadelphia, and intended to transport well-to-do persons from New York to summer homes on the New Jersey shore. This vessel was sold to West Coast interests in 1918, and later converted to an automobile ferry, serving on various routes in the San Francisco Bay, Puget Sound and British Columbia. This vessel was known by a number of other names, including City of Sacramento, Kahloke, Langdale Queen, and Lady Grace. She was retired as a ferryboat in 1976. The superstructure was removed in 1988 after being damaged, and Asbury Park operated as a barge until being abandoned sometime after 2004; she sank in 2008.

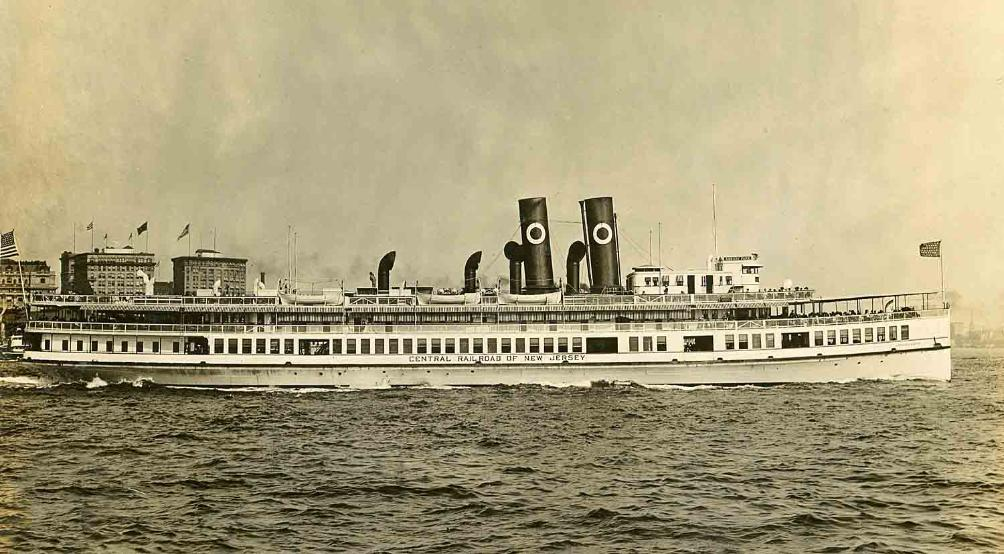
The Asbury Park of the Central Railroad of New Jersey

Asbury Park had a number of owners over her long career. These included, among others, the Jersey Central Railroad (1903-1918) Monticello Steamship Co. (1918-1917); Golden Gate Ferry Co. (1918-1927), Southern Pacific Railroad, (1927-1941), Puget Sound Navigation Company, (1941-1952), Black Ball Line, Ltd, (1951-1961), and BC Ferries (1961-1976).

== Engineering ==
As built, the mechanical plant of Asbury Park consisted of twin four-cylinder, triple expansion steam engines, compound steam engine; cylinder bores 23 in (58.4 cm), 37 in (94.0 cm) and 2x 43 in (109.2 cm); stroke 30 in (76.2 cm), generating 5,900 horsepower, with each engine driving a propeller shaft. Steam was generated by nine coal-fired boilers, which ventilated through twin smoke stacks. This drove the vessel at speeds in excess of 20 kn (37.04 km/h).

== Jersey coast service ==
The Jersey Central had a fleet of steamships which it operated from New York to points along the coast of New Jersey. Asbury Park was considered a prestige vessel and was the flagship of the Jersey Central fleet. The vessel was intended to attract wealthy patrons from New York's financial district, who would use the ship to reach their summer homes on the New Jersey shore.

With a speed of over 20 knots, she operated during the summer season between the north Jersey Shore and New York City. However, her size and speed made her ill-suited to the route, and she lacked manoeuvrability in the congested waters of New York harbour. With the decline in traffic during the First World War she was laid up during the 1917 and 1918 summer seasons.

== California service ==
War conditions and other economic problems had caused Asbury Park to be taken out of service in 1916. In 1918, Asbury Park was sold to the Monticello Steamship Company, a San Francisco firm. It was announced that prior to the transfer, extensive mechanical work would be done to the vessel, including removal of a number of the vessel's boilers (with a consequent decrease in engine power) and conversion to an oil-burner. In addition the saloons and staterooms of the vessel would be dismantled in preparation for conversion to a passenger ferry. However it appears that this work was not done on the East Coast, but later, after the vessel had reached California.

Asbury Park was taken to the west coast under Capt. Fred Warner and Chief Engineer Samuel Sutton. Once the vessel arrived in San Francisco it was placed on the Vallejo – Mare Island, transporting workers to Mare Island Naval Shipyard . In 1925 the vessel was extensively modified and renamed to become the commuter ferry SS City of Sacramento crossing San Francisco Bay between San Francisco and Vallejo. In 1925, she was refitted and more passenger deck space was added, and in 1927 she came under the ownership of Southern Pacific-Golden Gate Ferries following a series of mergers of the ferry companies operating on the Bay.

In 1927 Southern Pacific acquired Monticello Steamship Company, and its three ships, including City of Sacramento.

The opening of the San Francisco–Oakland Bay Bridge in 1936 and the Golden Gate Bridge in 1937 put most of the ferry services on San Francisco Bay out of business, and in 1941 the City of Sacramento was sold to the Puget Sound Navigation Company (PSNC) and moved to Puget Sound. There she operated between downtown Seattle and Bremerton, site of the Puget Sound Naval Shipyard, one of the United States Navy's main centres for building, maintaining, and repairing warships during the Second World War.

== Puget Sound service ==
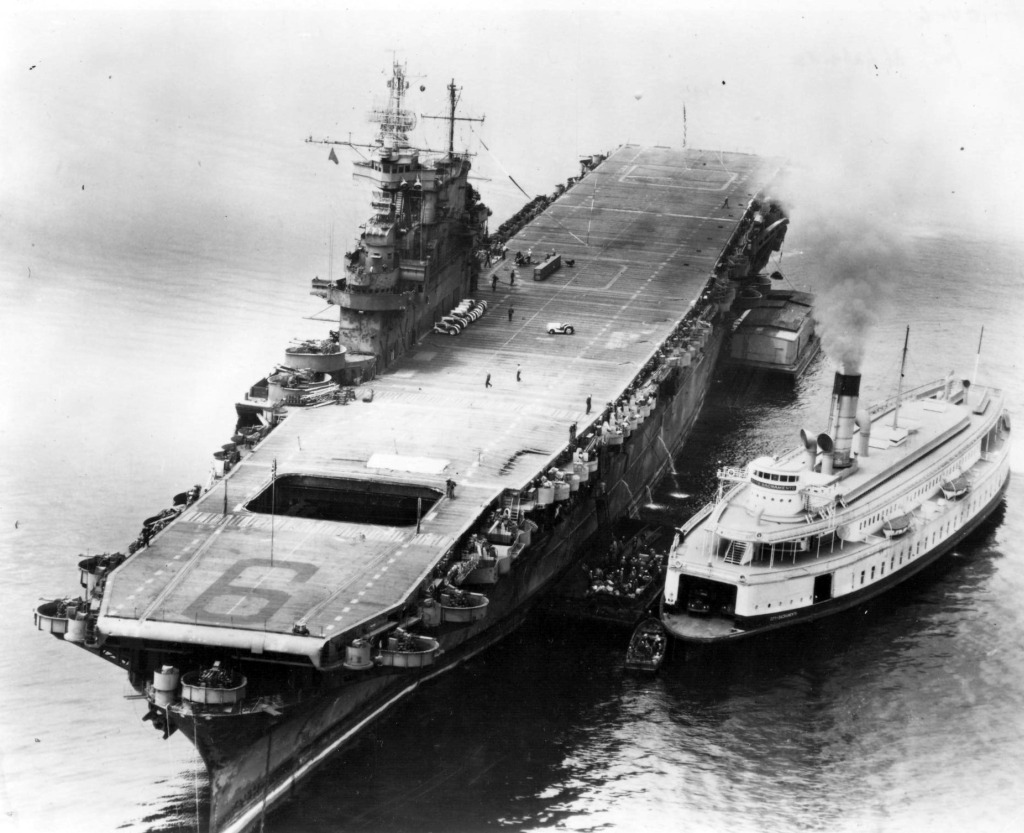
The aircraft carrier USS Enterprise unloading her sailors onto the City of Sacramento at the Puget Sound Navy Yard in June 1945. This was right after the aircraft carrier was nearly destroyed by a kamikaze encounter a month earlier off Okinawa.

To meet the rising demand for ferry capacity on the Seattle-Bremerton route, the vessel was purchased by Puget Sound Navigation Company (PSN) in 1941, but was not brought north to Puget Sound until May 1944. The delay had been caused by the Navy's having requisitioned the ship to transport workers to and from navy shipyards.

== British Columbia service ==
In 1950, City of Sacramento was taken out of service. Following the sale of most of the PSN fleet to the Washington State Ferry system in 1951, PSN reorganized itself into an international company which included a Canadian division, Black Ball Line Ltd.

In 1952–53, PSN transferred the vessel to Canadian registry, and moved to the Yarrows shipyard at Esquimalt, British Columbia, where the ship underwent a substantial reconstruction. The steam engines were removed and were replaced with four V-16 General Motors diesel-electric engines, each generating 1,750 horsepower. The new engineering plant drove the vessel at a service speed of 20 kn (37.04 km/h).

Passenger capacity of the reconstructed vessel was set at 1,000, with room for 100 automobiles on the six-lane car deck, which was 275 feet (84 m)long. The vessel was renamed Kahloke, and inaugurated the run from West Vancouver across the Strait of Georgia to Nanaimo on June 27, 1953, completing the route five times per day.

== Later years ==
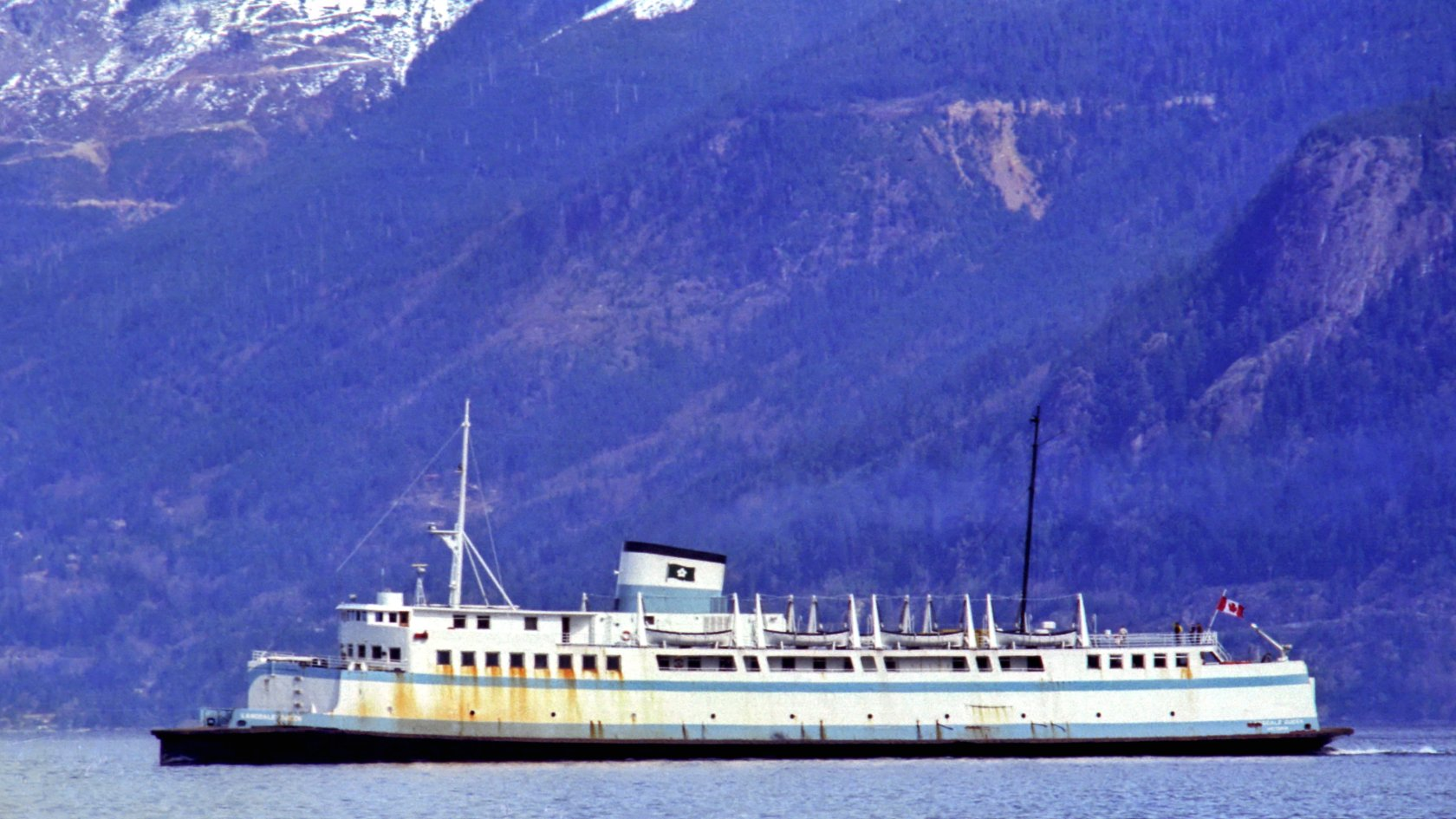
The Langdale Queen in service with BC Ferries, c. 1975

From 1955 to 1962 she operated along with the MV Chinook II crossing the Strait of Georgia between Nanaimo and Horseshoe Bay in West Vancouver.

In November 1961, Black Ball Ferries was purchased by BC Ferries, which had commenced operations in June 1960 as a division of the British Columbia Toll Highways and Bridges Authority, a Crown corporation of the British Columbia provincial government. In 1963, MV Kahloke was renamed MV Langdale Queen and moved to the Horseshoe Bay-Langdale route, where she continued to operate until 1976.

After being retired by BC Ferries, new owners sold the engines and renamed her MV Lady Grace. Under a succession of further changes of ownership, storms and a semi-submersion at her berth damaged her beyond repair. In 1988 her superstructure was removed, and her hull found service as a barge. After apparently being abandoned sometime after 2004 on the Fraser River, the barge sank after being covered in heavy snowfall in December 2008. The hull was raised and salvaged in the spring of 2009.

== See also ==
- BC Ferries
- Ferries of San Francisco Bay
- Jersey Central Railroad
- Puget Sound Navigation Company
