= Capital (sidewheeler) =

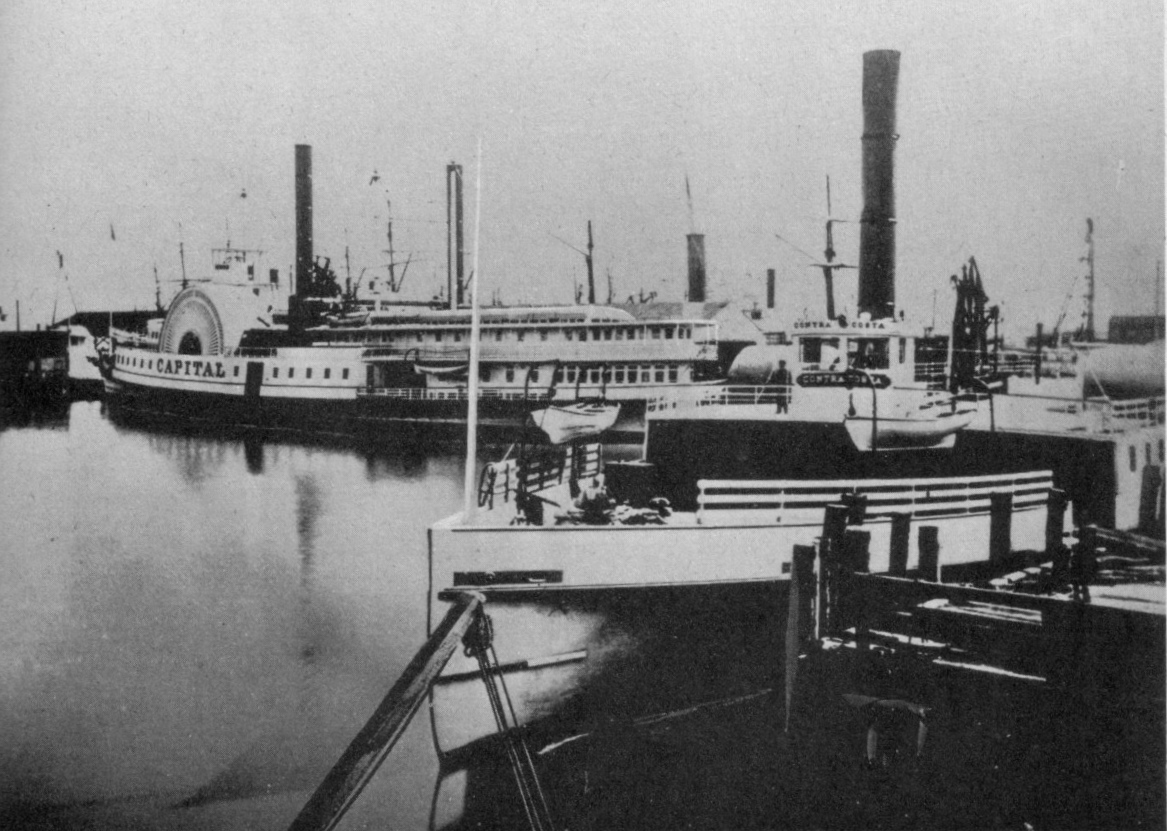
- Capital, steamboat, ran on San Francisco Bay and Sacramento River from 1866 to July 1876 when it became a ferry until 1896.

History
- Name: Capital
- Builder: John Gunder North, in San Francisco
- Laid down: 1866
- Launched: 1866
- Fate: Broken up in 1896.

General characteristics
- Type: Side-wheel paddle steamer
- Displacement: 1,989
- Length: 277

Capital, a famous side-wheel steamboat that ran between Sacramento and San Francisco from 1866 to 1896.

Capital was built in San Francisco, by shipbuilder John Gunder North in his shipyard in the Potrero District. Launched in 1866, it was a 277 feet long, 1,989 ton, side-wheel paddle steamer. Capital, was the largest of the steamboats on the rivers in California and the last side-wheel steamer built for the California Steam Navigation Company for the run between Sacramento and San Francisco until it was put to use as a ferry by the railroad between Oakland and San Francisco in July 1876. It remained on the water under various owners until it was broken up 1896.
