= Alameda-class ferry =

Class overview
- Builders: Southern Pacific Transportation Company Oakland shipyard
- Operators: 1914-1939 Southern Pacific
- Built: 1913-1915
- In service: 1914-1945
- Planned: 3
- Completed: 2
- Canceled: 1
- Retired: 2

General characteristics
- Type: passenger ferry
- Tonnage: gross-tonnage: 2,302; net-tonnage: 1,320
- Length: 273 ft (83.2 m)
- Beam: 42.3 ft (12.9 m)
- Depth: 15.3 ft (4.7 m)
- Installed power: Total 2,500 hp (1,900 kW) from 4 water tube boilers
- Propulsion: two 2-cylinder compound engines individually powering side wheels
- Crew: 18

Alameda was the first of three large-capacity ferries intended to transport passengers across San Francisco Bay. Southern Pacific Transportation Company and predecessor railroads had been operating ferries between San Francisco and Oakland, California since 1862. By the early 20th century, service had stabilized on three routes to the San Francisco Ferry Building from Oakland Pier, Alameda, and the San Antonio Creek estuary. Each route required two ferries shuttling back and forth to meet the departure schedule, with a third ferry in reserve when one boat needed maintenance or repair. Southern Pacific's engineering department designed Alameda for the heavily traveled Oakland Pier route as passenger counts rose during the period of prosperity preceding World War I. Alameda used side wheels for propulsion; but, instead of being powered by a single walking beam engine, wheels were powered independently by two engines for greater maneuverability. The twin stacks were distinctive among 20th century San Francisco Bay ferries.

== Alameda ==
Alameda (documentation number 211868) was launched from Southern Pacific's Oakland shipyard in late 1913 and placed in service on 23 February 1914. In the early morning hours of 15 January 1939, Alameda made the last ferry run with connecting Oakland electric railway service before electric trains were routed over the San Francisco–Oakland Bay Bridge. Alameda was then idled until World War II when she was used as a relief boat for the ferries transporting shipyard workers from San Francisco to the Richmond Shipyards. She was sold to the United States Navy as floating barracks designated YHB-25, and scrapped in 1948.

== Santa Clara ==
The hull of Santa Clara was built by New Jersey Ship Building Company for $97,000 while Alameda occupied Southern Pacific's Oakland shipyard; but the hull was towed to Oakland for completion after Alameda entered service. Santa Clara (documentation number 213389) was placed in service on 3 July 1915. Santa Clara required extensive repair later that year following a fire started in the engine room. After being temporarily idled with Alameda following routing of electric commuter trains over the Bay Bridge, Santa Clara carried shipyard workers from San Francisco to Marinship through the second world war; and was scrapped in 1947.

== San Mateo ==
The third ferry was to have been named San Mateo, but construction was delayed to repair Santa Clara, then by the shift of United States industrial capacity to armaments production, and finally canceled by the United States Railroad Administration. The name was later given to one of the Six Minute ferries acquired in 1922.
