= Tiburon Ferry Terminal =

Ferry landing in San Francisco bay area, California, USA

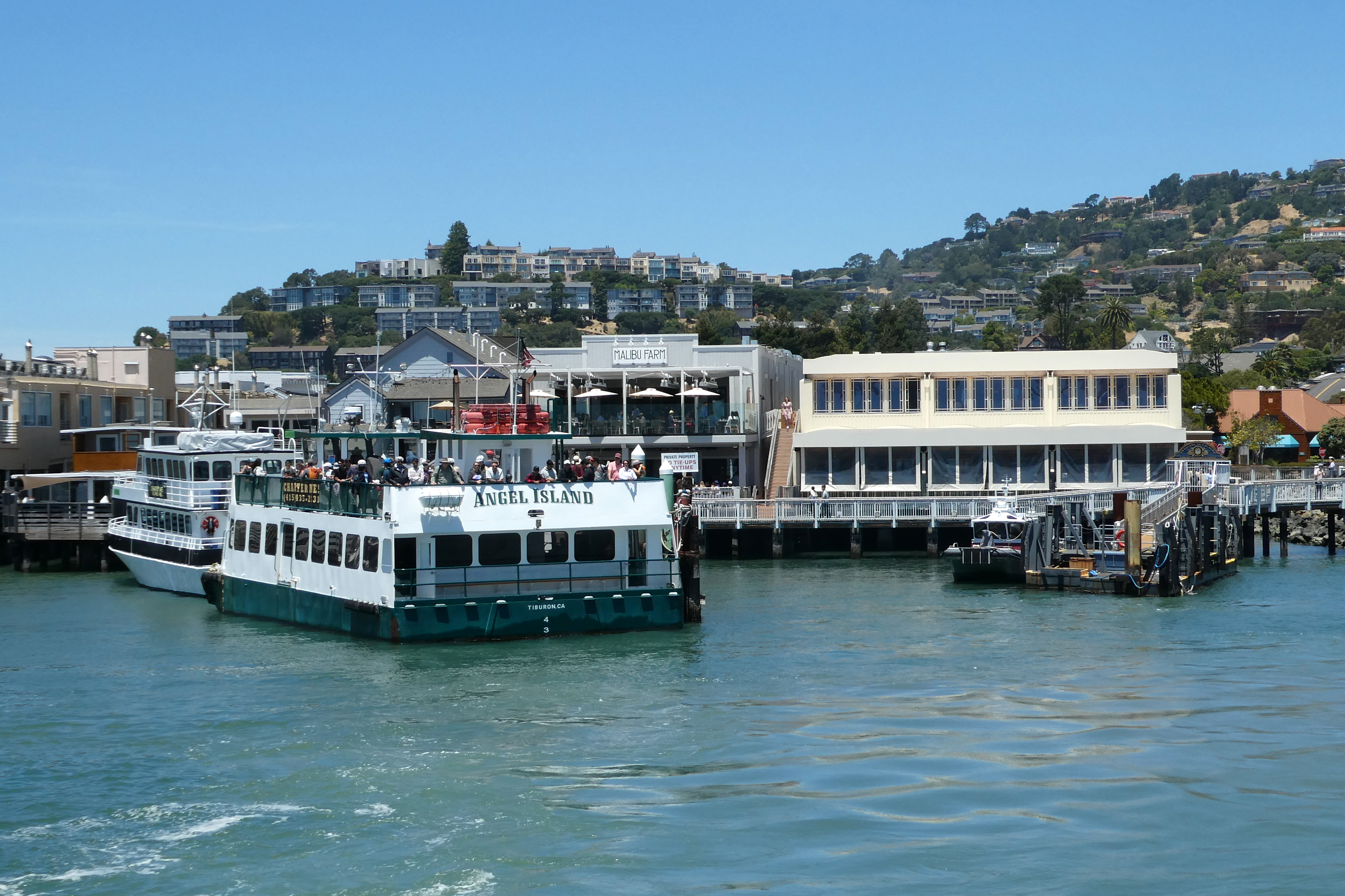
- MV Angel Island at Tiburon in 2024

General information
- Location: Paradise Drive at Main Street; Tiburon, California
- Coordinates: 37.872817°N 122.455437°W
- Operator: Golden Gate Ferry
- Connections: Marin Transit: 219
Location

The Tiburon Ferry Terminal is a ferry landing for Golden Gate Ferry and Angel Island–Tiburon Ferry Company passenger ferries in Tiburon, California in the San Francisco Bay Area's North Bay. It connects commuters from Marin County with job centers in San Francisco across the San Francisco Bay to the Ferry Building. The terminal also provides tourist and recreational passenger service to the Ayala Cove Ferry Terminal on Angel Island State Park.

This terminal originally served as the North Pacific Coast Railroad's connection point for ferries to San Francisco. The railroad was bought by the Northwestern Pacific Railroad which shifted all passenger rail and San Francisco ferry service to Sausalito in 1909, leaving Tiburon freight-only; shuttle passenger ferries from Tiburon to Sausalito continued until 1933. Freight rail service ended September 25, 1967. In 1959 the Angel Island–Tiburon Ferry began service. Commuter service to San Francisco was resumed by Red & White Fleet (then known as Harbor Carriers) in 1962. This service was taken over by Blue & Gold Fleet in 1997 and by Golden Gate Ferry on March 6, 2017.
