= Ayala Cove Ferry Terminal =

Ferry terminal on Angel Island in Marin County, California, USA

Ayala Cove Ferry Terminal Angel Island Ferry Terminal
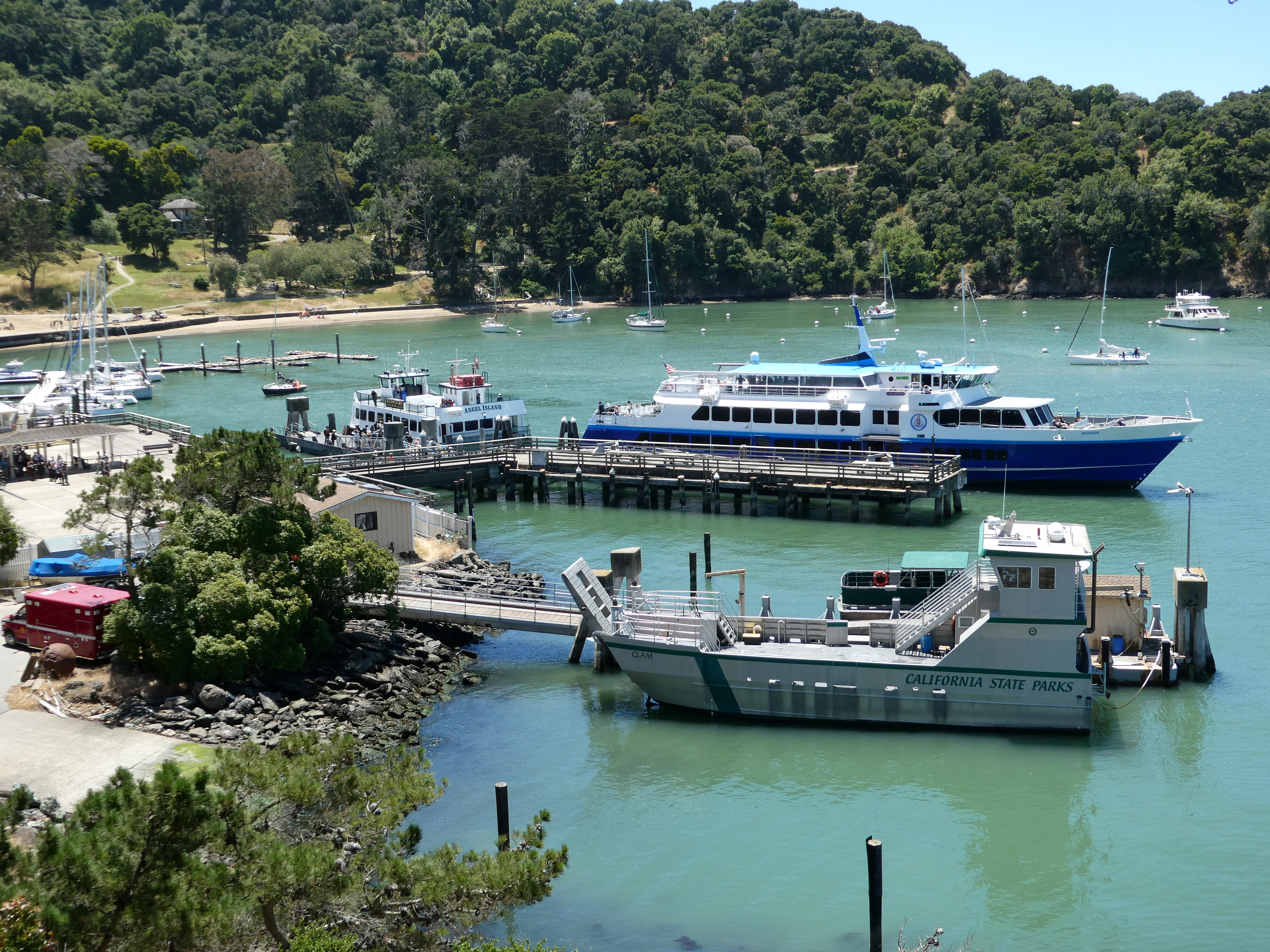
- Ayala Cove Ferry Terminal in June 2024

General information
- Location: Marin County, California
- Coordinates: 37.8686°N 122.4348°W
Location

Ayala Cove Ferry Terminal is a ferry terminal on Angel Island in Marin County, California in the San Francisco Bay Area. There is regularly scheduled passenger ferry service to Tiburon as well as San Francisco.

Service is provided by the Angel Island - Tiburon Ferry and takes 15 minutes crossing Raccoon Strait to Tiburon Ferry Terminal. Golden Gate Ferry operates ferries to the San Francisco Ferry Building.
