= Melrose Park, Lexington =

Place in Kentucky, United States

Melrose Park
- Neighborhood of Lexington, Kentucky
- Interactive map of Melrose Park
- Coordinates: 38.059°N 84.518°W
- Country: United States
- State: Kentucky
- County: Fayette
- City: Lexington

Area
  - Total: 0.165 sq mi (0.427 km^{2})

Population (2000)
  - Total: 505
  - Density: 3,064/sq mi (1,183/km^{2})
- Time zone: UTC-5 (Eastern (EST))
  - Summer (DST): UTC-4 (EDT)
- ZIP code: 40508
- Area code: 859

Melrose Park is a neighborhood just northwest of downtown Lexington, Kentucky, United States. Its boundaries are Forbes Road to the west, Main Street to the north, CSX railroad tracks to the east, and Manchester Street to the south.

== Neighborhood statistics ==
- Population in 2000: 505
- Land area: 0.165
- Population density: 3,064 people per square mile (1,183 people/km^{2})
- Median income: $38,887
