= Melrose High School =

Melrose High School may refer to:

- Melrose High School – located at present-day Melrose Elementary School in Melrose, Florida
- Melrose High School (Canberra), Australia
- Melrose High School (Massachusetts), USA
- Melrose High School (Minnesota), USA
- Melrose High School – Melrose, New Mexico
- Melrose High School (Memphis, Tennessee)
- Melrose-Mindoro High School – Melrose, Wisconsin
