= Melrose Apartments =

Melrose Apartments may refer to:

- Melrose Apartments (St. Louis, Missouri), listed on the National Register of Historic Places (NRHP) in St. Louis, Missouri
- Melrose Apartments (Omaha, Nebraska), listed on the NRHP in Nebraska as The Melrose
