= Angel Island–Tiburon Ferry =

Ferry route in California, United States

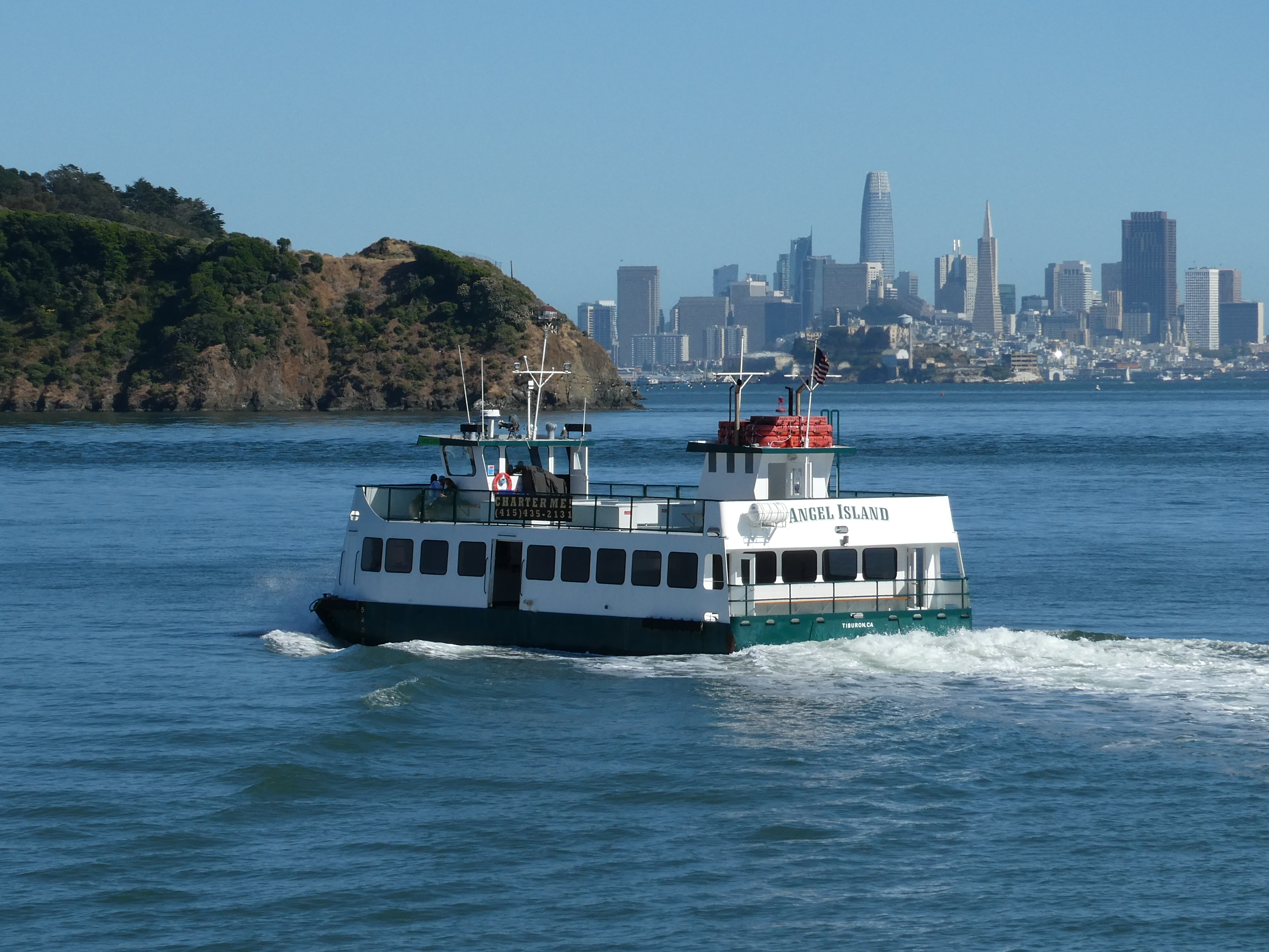
The Angel Island in 2024

The Angel Island–Tiburon Ferry Company is a privately owned and operated ferry service in California that links Tiburon's Tiburon Ferry Terminal with Ayala Cove Ferry Terminal on Angel Island. The ferry runs every day except Thanksgiving and Christmas. The company also operates San Francisco Bay and whale watching cruises.

The owner and frequent ferry operator is Maggie McDonogh, whose family has maintained the service since 1959. The concession is occasionally put out to bid by the California Department of Parks and Recreation, though McDonogh has operated month to month since 1993. The 2018 bidding process attracted only one application from Blue & Gold Fleet. Despite this, as of February 2019 the process has been placed on hold, with McDonogh still running ferries.
