= Melrose North =

- Location within Gauteng Location within South Africa
- Coordinates: 26.13°S 28.063°E
- Country: South Africa
- Province: Gauteng
- Municipality: City of Johannesburg

Area
  - Total: 0.74 km^{2} (0.29 sq mi)

Population (2001)
  - Total: 1,104
  - Density: 1,500/km^{2} (3,900/sq mi)
- Time zone: UTC+2 (SAST)
- Postal code (street): 2196

Melrose North is a suburb of Johannesburg, South Africa. It is located in Region E of the City of Johannesburg Metropolitan Municipality.
