= Oakland Alameda Water Shuttle =

Ferry in the San Francisco Bay Area

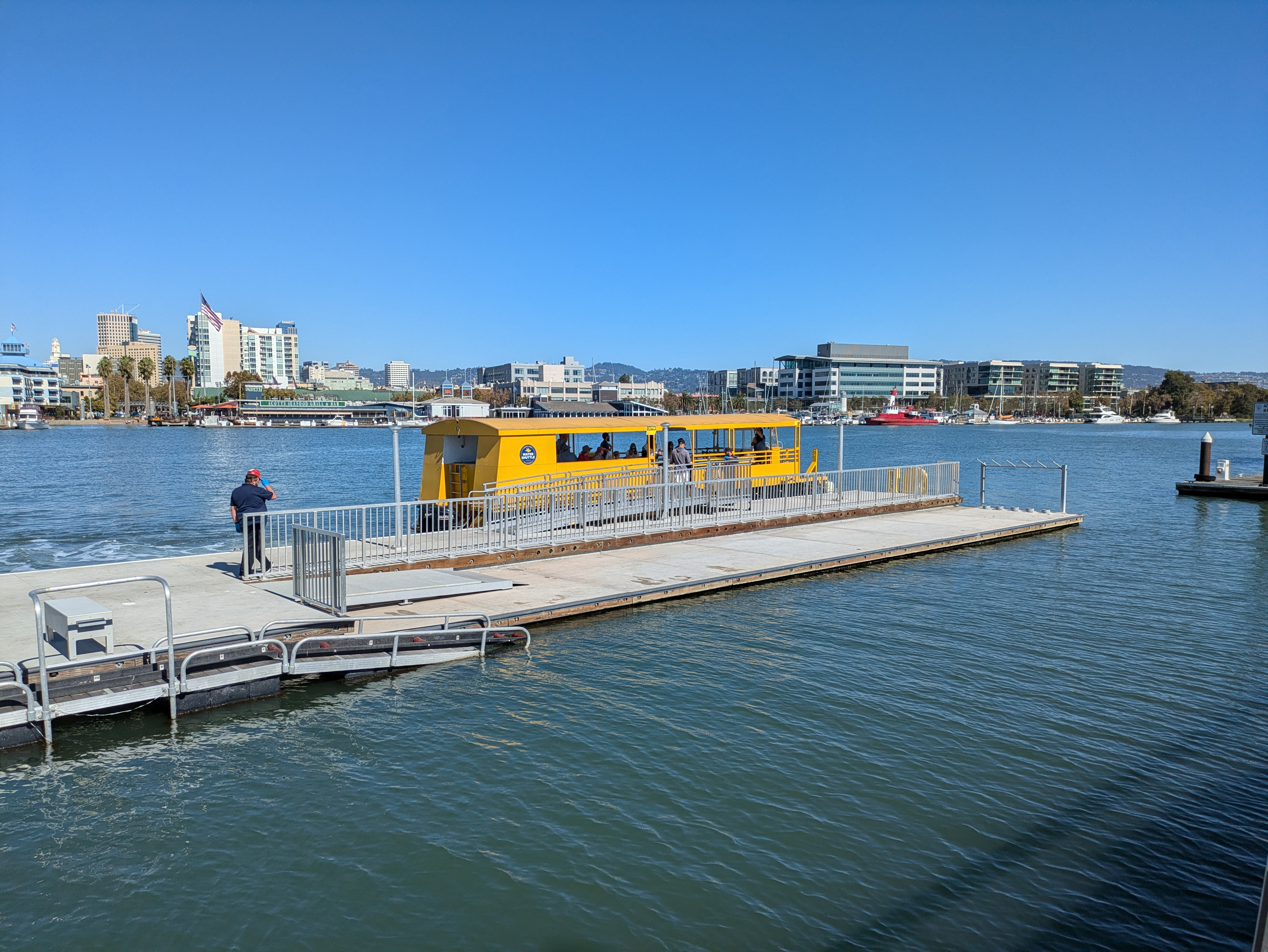
- The ferry boat Woodstock at the Alameda pier in 2024. Oakland’s Jack London Square is visible in the background, across the estuary.
- Locale: San Francisco Bay Area
- Waterway: Oakland Estuary
- Carries: Pedestrians and bicycles
- Operator: San Francisco Bay Ferry
- Began operation: July 17, 2024
- Travel time: 7 minutes
- No. of lines: 1
- No. of terminals: 2
- Website: watershuttle.org

The Oakland Alameda Water Shuttle is a ferry service operated between the cities of Oakland and Alameda, across the Oakland Estuary, carrying pedestrians and bicycles.

== Background ==
The cities of Oakland and Alameda are separated by approximately 850 feet (260 m) across the Oakland Estuary. New residential and commercial developments in the 2010s and 2020s have created increased transportation demand in western Alameda.

The only fixed connections between the mainland and Alameda Island are the Posey and Webster Street Tubes on the western side of the island and three bridges on the eastern side of the island. The Posey Tube only allows bicycles and pedestrians on a narrow, sooty, noisy walkway measuring only 3 feet (0.91 m) across, and bicycles and pedestrians are not permitted to use the Webster Street Tube. The westernmost of the bridges, the Park Street Bridge, is approximately 2.5 miles (4.0 km) east of the tubes, thus forcing cyclists wishing to avoid an unpleasant ride through the Posey Tube to take a long detour.

Bicycles are permitted on the nearby Oakland–Alameda–San Francisco ferry (a route of the San Francisco Bay Ferry system), but this operates as a cyclical, three-legged service, so depending on the time of day and direction of travel, passengers wishing to cross the estuary this way may need to ride the ferry all the way across the Bay to San Francisco and then back to reach their desired destination — a journey taking over an hour.

To improve access to western Alameda, a free shuttle service was launched as a two-year pilot program on July 17, 2024. It is funded by a combination of agencies and organizations including the City of Alameda, Water Emergency Transportation Authority (WETA, administrator of the San Francisco Bay Ferry), Alameda Transportation Management Association, West Alameda Transportation Management Association, Jack London Square Property Management Company (CIM Group), the Port of Oakland, the Jack London Improvement District, Alameda County's Vehicle Registration Fees, and the Bay Area Air Quality Management District's TFCA County Program Manager funds, and administered and operated by WETA.

After initially operating only Wednesdays through Sundays, Tuesday service was added beginning in July 2025. In February 2026, the original two-year pilot was extended for an additional nineteen months due to high ridership.

== Operation ==
The water shuttle operates at varying headways from 7am to 8pm Tuesdays through Thursdays and 7am to 10pm Fridays through Sundays. It does not operate on Mondays. It serves two terminals: Jack London Square at the foot of Broadway in Oakland, and Bohol Circle Immigrant Park near the Alameda Landing shopping area in Alameda. The crossing takes approximately 7 minutes each way.

The boat, a 45-foot, yellow pontoon boat named Woodstock, has a capacity of 31 passengers and 14 bicycles, and is fully accessible to wheelchairs. Pets are allowed but must be enclosed in a container carried on the passenger's lap. The vessel was built in 2004 and previously operated in the Buffalo, New York harbor under the name Captain Jack.

== Future bridge ==
Plans are underway for the shuttle to eventually be replaced by a permanent movable bridge for pedestrians and bicycles. The United States Coast Guard, which navigates ships through the channel to and from the nearby Coast Guard Base Alameda, has imposed strict vertical and horizontal clearance requirements that would make any such bridge expensive to design and build (approximately $300 million as of 2025). Construction is not anticipated to begin until 2030 at the earliest.
