= Melrose (store) =

American clothing store chain

United Fashions of Texas, LLC
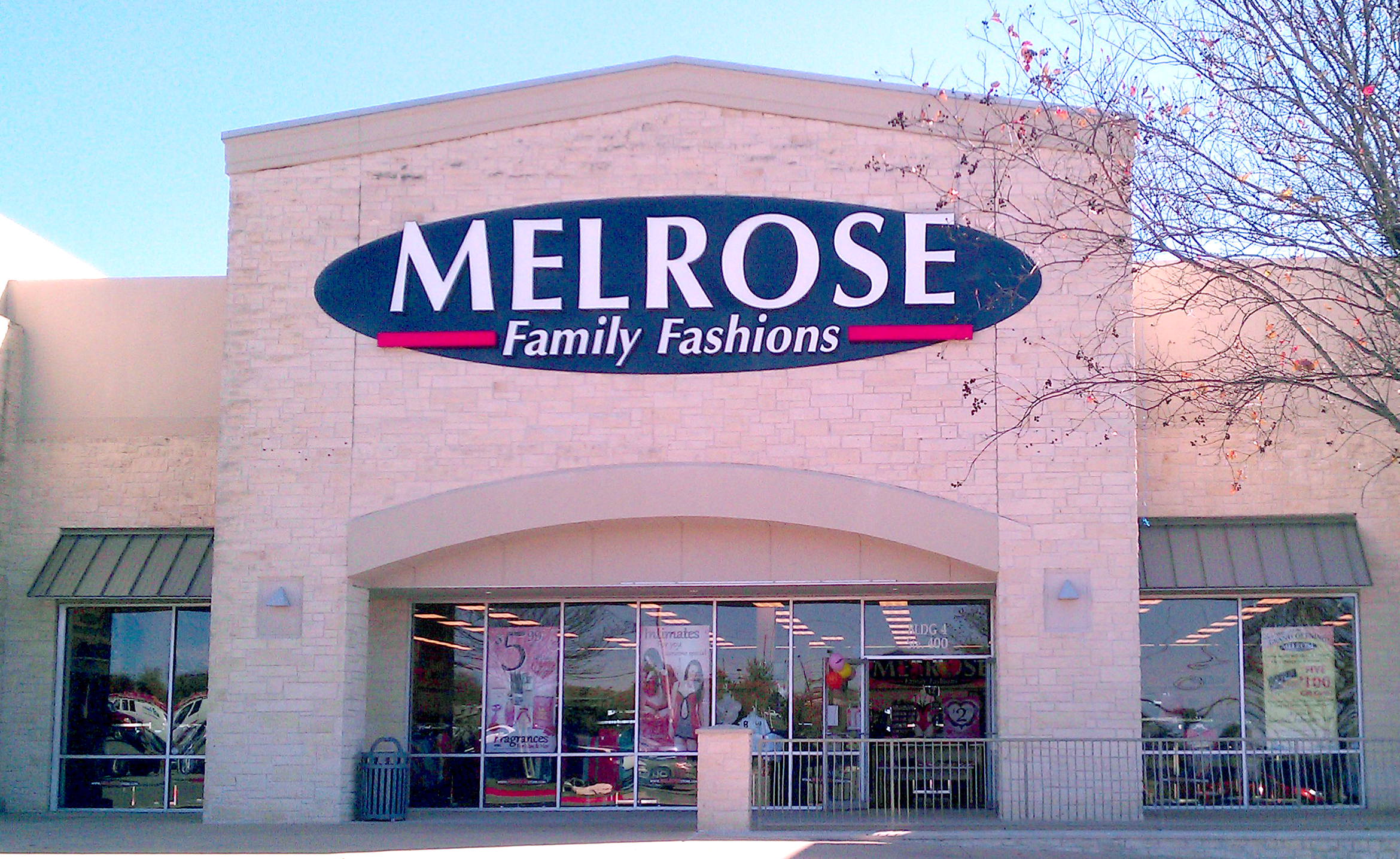
- Company type: Private
- Industry: Retail
- Founded: McAllen, Texas (1976)
- Headquarters: San Antonio, Texas
- Products: Clothing, footwear and accessories(varies at location)
- Website: www.melrosestore.com

Melrose Family Fashions is a clothing store chain in the Southwestern United States operated by United Fashions of Texas, Ltd.

Melrose was started in 1976 with one store in McAllen, Texas, by the Bar-Yadin family, immigrants from Israel.

This single store specialized in fashion for "Juniors," but over the years, it grew into a chain that included a plus-size and a Contemporary Misses department.

Over one hundred stores are in Texas, New Mexico, Arizona, Nevada, and California. In recent years, Melrose has added departments for men's and kids' fashions, electronics, home goods, and expanded its cosmetics departments.
