= Six Minute ferries =

Class overview
- Builders: Bethlehem Steel, San Francisco
- Operators: 1922-1937 Southern Pacific Transportation Company; 1940-1951 Black Ball Line; 1951-1969 Washington State Ferries; 1940-1948 Argentina-Uruguayan Navigation Touring Company
- Built: 1922-1923
- In service: 1922-1969
- Building: 3
- Completed: 3
- Retired: 3

General characteristics
- Type: auto/automobile ferry
- Tonnage: gross-tonnage: 1,782; net-tonnage: 1120
- Length: 216.7 ft (66.1 m)
- Beam: 42.1 ft (12.8 m)
- Depth: 17.3 ft (5.3 m)
- Installed power: Total 1,400 hp (1,000 kW) from 3 water tube boilers
- Propulsion: 3-cylinder triple expansion engine powering a single screw
- Speed: 10 kn (19 km/h)
- Capacity: 80 vehicles

Six Minute Ferry operated an automobile ferry service across Carquinez Strait on the main highway between Sacramento and Oakland, California. Each crossing near the present Interstate 80 bridge took approximately 6 minutes. As automobile travel became increasingly popular, the company ordered some new steel ferries in 1921. The ferry company went out of business while the ferries were under construction after a March 1922 landslide destroyed the Six Minute Ferry north shore terminal on Morrow Cove. Southern Pacific Transportation Company purchased the ferries ordered by Six Minute Ferry and placed them in service between San Francisco and Oakland. The three ferries remained in service on various San Francisco Bay routes until completion of the San Francisco–Oakland Bay Bridge in 1936 and the Golden Gate Bridge in 1937.

== San Mateo ==
San Mateo (documentation number 222386) was launched on 9 May 1922 and delivered to Southern Pacific on 21 July. After 18 years on San Francisco Bay, Puget Sound Navigation Company purchased San Mateo in 1940. She became part of the Washington State Ferry System in 1951 and was the last steam ferry on Puget sound when retired in 1969. She has since been scrapped in the Fraser River.

== Shasta ==
Shasta (documentation number 222598) was launched on 5 October 1922 and delivered to Southern Pacific on 18 November. After 18 years on San Francisco Bay, Puget Sound Navigation Company purchased Shasta in 1940. She became part of the Washington State Ferry System in 1951 and, following retirement in 1959, was towed to Portland, Oregon, for use as a restaurant.

== Yosemite ==
Yosemite (documentation number 222722) was launched on 19 October 1922 and delivered to Southern Pacific on 25 January 1923. After 16 years on San Francisco Bay, the Argentina-Uruguayan Navigation Touring Company purchased Yosemite for $70,000 in 1939, and paid Bethlehem Shipbuilding $35,000 to modify the ferry to reach the Rio de la Plata under its own power. The ferry was renamed Argentina and equipped with structural reinforcement, new keels, additional fuel and water tanks, a radio, and quarters for a 21-man crew. Captain Eduardo M. Saez of the Uruguayan Navy sailed from San Francisco on 16 April 1940 on a 9,000 mile (15,000 km) voyage to Montevideo via the Panama Canal. The trip taking 50 days was thought to be the longest for any ferry operating under its own power. After serving a few years on a 30-mile (50 km) route across the Rio de la Plata, Argentina was converted to a barge which sank in 1948.
