= Melrose (ferry) =

History
- Name: Melrose
- Owner: Southern Pacific-Golden Gate Ferries Ltd
- Operator: Southern Pacific-Golden Gate Ferries Ltd
- Port of registry: San Francisco, USA
- Builder: Southern Pacific Transportation Company Oakland shipyard
- Completed: 1909
- In service: 1909
- Out of service: 1931
- Identification: Official Number: 205918

General characteristics
- Class & type: auto/passenger ferry
- Tonnage: 2662
- Displacement: 1677
- Length: 273 ft (83 m)
- Beam: 43 ft (13 m)
- Depth: 17.9 ft (5 m)
- Installed power: Total 1,340 hp from 4 Scotch marine boilers
- Propulsion: side wheels powered by two inclined compound steam engines
- Crew: 1909:8; 1915:16

Melrose was the first San Francisco Bay ferry designed to carry automobiles. Southern Pacific Transportation Company and predecessor railroads had been operating ferries between San Francisco and Oakland, California since 1862. Some ferries were equipped to carry team-drawn wagons, but the increasing number of automobiles requiring transport encouraged building of a ferry with an unobstructed lower deck for automobiles and 400 seats on an upper deck for passengers. Melrose was launched without engines on 11 April 1906. Installation of engines being built at San Francisco's Union Iron Works was delayed by the 1906 San Francisco earthquake a week after launching. The ferry was not completed until 1909. The side wheels were powered by two inclined tandem engines to avoid main deck obstruction by a traditional walking beam engine.

The successful design of Melrose encouraged completion of sister ship Thoroughfare in 1912. Thoroughfare cost $170,000 with capacity for 97 automobiles and 45 team-drawn wagons. These two ferries offered departures at 30-minute intervals through the daylight and evening hours. Automobiles were carried on the "creek route" until new loading facilities were completed on the Oakland pier in 1921. Thoroughfare steamed into the ferry slip at full speed when her engine-order telegraph malfunctioned on 14 August 1913. The ferry was less damaged than the slipway and resumed service shortly after the engine-order telegraph was repaired.

Melrose collided with the Southern Pacific ferry Bay City in a patch of dense fog on 26 January 1913. Both ferries continued in service after repairs. Two Melrose deckhands were killed while attempting to rescue a man overboard on 9 July 1917 when the lifeboat they had launched to recover the passenger was drawn into the maneuvering ferry's paddle wheel. Melrose narrowly avoided collision with the freighter K.J.Luckenback in fog on 4 February 1922. Melrose ran aground while maneuvering to avoid collision, and required the assistance of tugs to be refloated. In July 1926, Melrose suffered a mid-bay mechanical breakdown requiring assistance of tugs. The rescue tug accidentally rammed Melrose while passing a tow line. Melrose started flooding and was grounded on a mud bar to prevent sinking until repairs could be made.

Melrose was retired in 1931 and Thoroughfare was sold in 1935 to become a fish reduction plant in Benicia, California. Completion of the San Francisco–Oakland Bay Bridge in 1936 ended the need for automobile ferries between Oakland and San Francisco.
