= Chrysopolis (sidewheeler) =

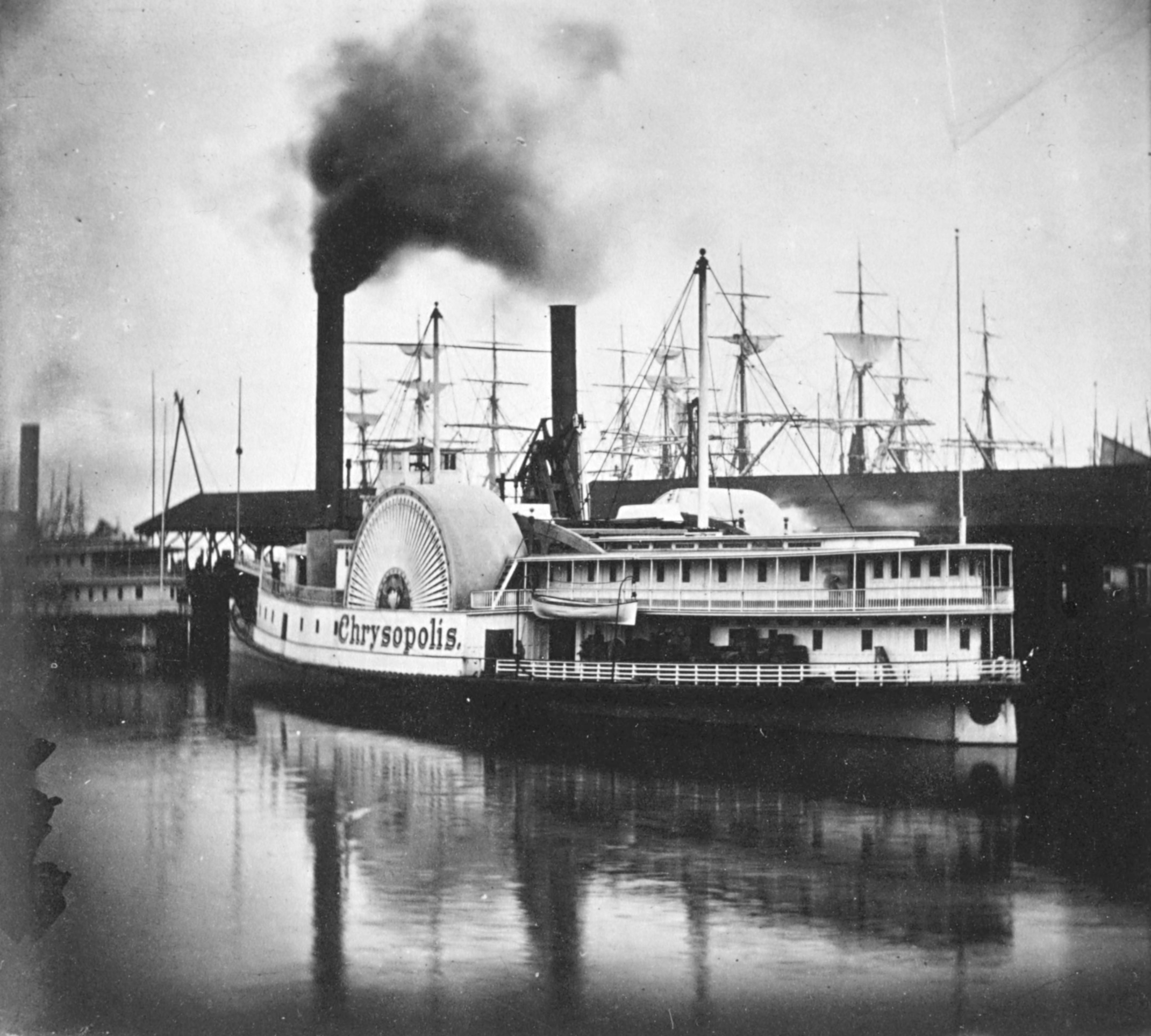
- Chrysopolis, at the time it was built North's largest steamboat, and the fastest on the San Francisco - Sacramento run from 1860 - 1875. Rebuilt in 1875 by Patrick Henry Tiernan, it ran as the San Francisco Bay ferry Oakland until 1940.

History
- Name: Chrysopolis
- Builder: John Gunder North, in San Francisco
- Laid down: 1860
- Launched: 1860
- Fate: Rebuilt in 1875 as the San Francisco Bay ferry Oakland. Destroyed by fire in 1940.

General characteristics
- Type: Side-wheel paddle steamer
- Displacement: 1,050 tons
- Length: 245 feet
- Beam: 40 feet
- Draught: 4.5 feet
- Propulsion: single cylinder, vertical-beam engine
- Speed: 19.8 knots
- Notes: Capacity: 1,000 passengers, 700 tons of cargo.

Chrysopolis (Greek for "city of gold") was a famous side-wheel steamboat that ran between Sacramento and San Francisco from 1860 to 1875 when it was rebuilt as a ferry that continued in service for more than 60 years.

Chrysopolis was built in San Francisco, by shipbuilder John Gunder North in his new shipyard in the Potrero District. Launched in 1860, it was a side-wheel paddle steamer of 245 feet long with a 40-foot beam, displacing 1050 tons. It was equipped with a 1,357 horsepower, single cylinder, vertical-beam engine powered by two 32 ton boilers. It had two side-wheels 32 feet in diameter with 8 foot buckets (the wooden blades of a paddle wheel). It could carry 1,000 passengers and 700 tons of cargo at great speed. On December 31, 1861, it made the record setting run for a steamboat over the 120 mile distance between Sacramento and San Francisco in 5 hours and 19 minutes, making an average speed of 19.8 knots.

== Rebuilt as Ferry "Oakland" ==
Chrysopolis was rebuilt in 1875 by Patrick Henry Tiernan as the San Francisco Bay ferry Oakland. Tiernan turned it into a double ended ferry-boat, cutting it in two and extending her length to 282 feet 7 inches overall with depth of hold amidships, 17.5 feet. It was destroyed by fire in 1940.
