= Washington State Route 104 =

Highway in Washington

State Route 104
- SR 104 highlighted in red

Route information
- Auxiliary route of US 101
- Maintained by WSDOT
- Length: 31.75 mi (51.10 km) Mileage does not include ferry route
- Existed: 1964–present

Major junctions
- West end: US 101 near Discovery Bay
- SR 19 near Port Ludlow; SR 3 near Port Gamble; SR 524 in Edmonds; SR 99 in Edmonds; I-5 in Shoreline
- East end: SR 522 in Lake Forest Park

Location
- Country: United States
- State: Washington
- Counties: Jefferson, Kitsap, Snohomish, King

Highway system
- State highways in Washington; Interstate; US; State; Scenic; Pre-1964; 1964 renumbering; Former
← SR 103	→ SR 105

State Route 104 (SR 104) is a 31.75-mile-long (51.10 km) state highway in the U.S. state of Washington, serving four counties: Jefferson on the Olympic Peninsula, Kitsap on the Kitsap Peninsula, and Snohomish and King in the Puget Sound region. It begins south of Discovery Bay at U.S. Route 101 (US 101) and crosses the Hood Canal Bridge over Hood Canal to the terminus of SR 3 near Port Gamble. SR 104 continues southeast onto the Edmonds–Kingston Ferry to cross the Puget Sound and intersects SR 99 and Interstate 5 (I-5) before ending at SR 522 in Lake Forest Park. SR 104 also has a short spur route that connects the highway to SR 99 at an at-grade signal on the Snohomish–King county line.

Established during the 1964 state highway renumbering, SR 104 was formed out of four highways, themselves created in 1937: Secondary State Highway 9E (SSH 9E) from Discovery Bay to Port Gamble, Primary State Highway 21 (PSH 21) from Port Gamble to Kingston, SSH 1W within Edmonds, and SSH 2B from Edmonds to Lake Forest Park. PSH 21 was originally part of State Road 21, added to the state highway system in 1915 to connect the Port Gamble–Shine ferry to the Kingston ferry landing. The Edmonds–Kingston ferry at the end of State Road 21 has been in operation under various companies since 1923 and was served by the 14-car City of Edmonds. SSH 9E extended from Discovery Bay to Port Ludlow initially and was moved south and extended to the South Point ferry landing in the late 1940s. The bridge replaced the South Point–Lofall ferry when it opened in 1961, but the ferry was re-used during the construction of the second Hood Canal Bridge after the first bridge sank in 1979 and before the new bridge opened in 1982. The Edmonds–Kingston ferry was added to the state ferry system in 1951 before it was incorporated into SR 104 in 1994.

== Route description ==
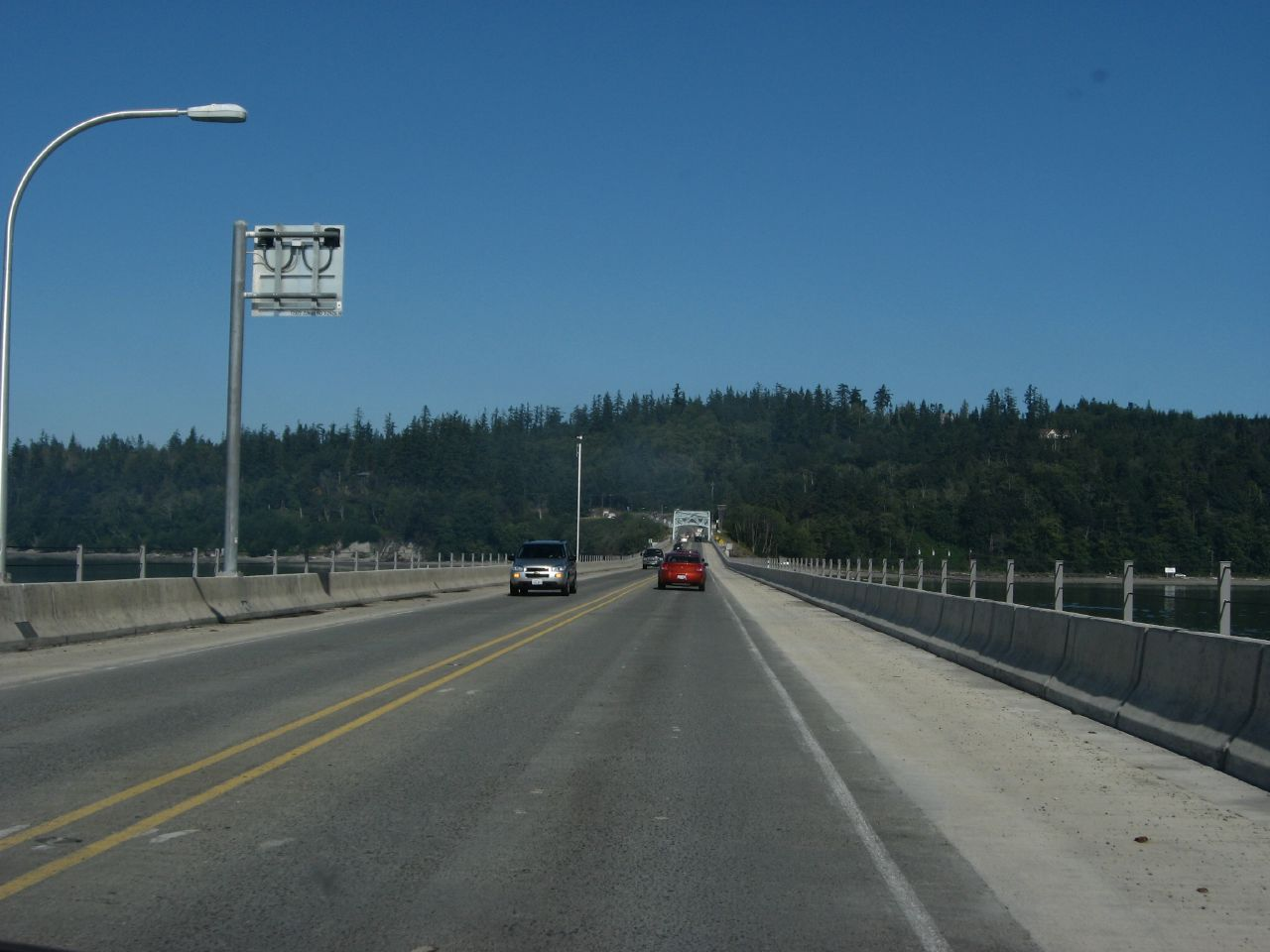
SR 104 westbound on the Hood Canal Bridge, traveling towards the Olympic Peninsula

SR 104 begins at an intersection with US 101, located south of Discovery Bay on the Olympic Peninsula. The highway travels south through rural Jefferson County towards Crocker Lake and turns southeast, intersecting SR 19 south of Port Ludlow. SR 104 continues east along the northern shore of Squamish Harbor, part of the Hood Canal, and crosses into Kitsap County on the 7,869-foot-long (2,398 m) Hood Canal Bridge, the third longest floating bridge in the world. The highway serves as the northern terminus of SR 3 east of the bridge and turns northeast towards Port Gamble, located on the Kitsap Peninsula. SR 104 turns south along the western shore of Port Gamble, the bay the community is named after, and turns southeast to intersect SR 307. The highway continues east from the intersection to Kingston, where it splits into a one-way pair before the designation travels onto the Edmonds–Kingston Ferry.

The ferry, operated by Washington State Ferries (WSF), takes approximately 30 minutes to cross 5.95 miles (9.58 km) across Puget Sound. It departs from Kingston on Appletree Cove and arrives in Edmonds in Snohomish County. WSF operates thirteen round-trip crossings every day. Westbound passengers must pay a $7.70 toll or they may alternately pay with a prepaid Wave2Go card.

SR 104 resumes in Edmonds on Main Street and crosses a BNSF rail line south of Edmonds Station. The highway turns south at an intersection with SR 524 onto Sunset Avenue towards Woodway. The roadway travels southeast along Edmonds Way towards the Snohomish–King county line, intersecting SR 524 Spur and 5th Street at a grade-separated interchange. Edmonds Way travels through a partial cloverleaf interchange with SR 99 before SR 104 intersects its spur route, which travels west towards an at-grade signal with SR 99. The highway continues east along Ballinger Way to a partial cloverleaf interchange with I-5 southeast of Lake Ballinger. The highway travels southeast into Lake Forest Park, where SR 104 ends at SR 522 on the north shore of Lake Washington.

SR 104 is considered, by the Washington State Department of Transportation (WSDOT), an auxiliary route of US 101, part of a numbering system established during the 1964 state highway renumbering. Every year, WSDOT conducts a series of surveys on its highways in the state to measure traffic volume. This is expressed in terms of annual average daily traffic (AADT), which is a measure of traffic volume for any average day of the year. In 2011, WSDOT calculated that between 3,800 and 44,000 vehicles per day used the highway, mostly in the Shoreline area. The Edmonds–Kingston ferry carried 3.808 million passengers and 2.025 million vehicles in 2012, according to WSF statistics. The segments of the highway between Discovery Bay and Kingston and SR 99 and I-5 in Edmonds and Shoreline are designated as part of the National Highway System, while the whole route is designated by WSDOT as a Highway of Statewide Significance because it connects major communities in the state of Washington.

== History ==
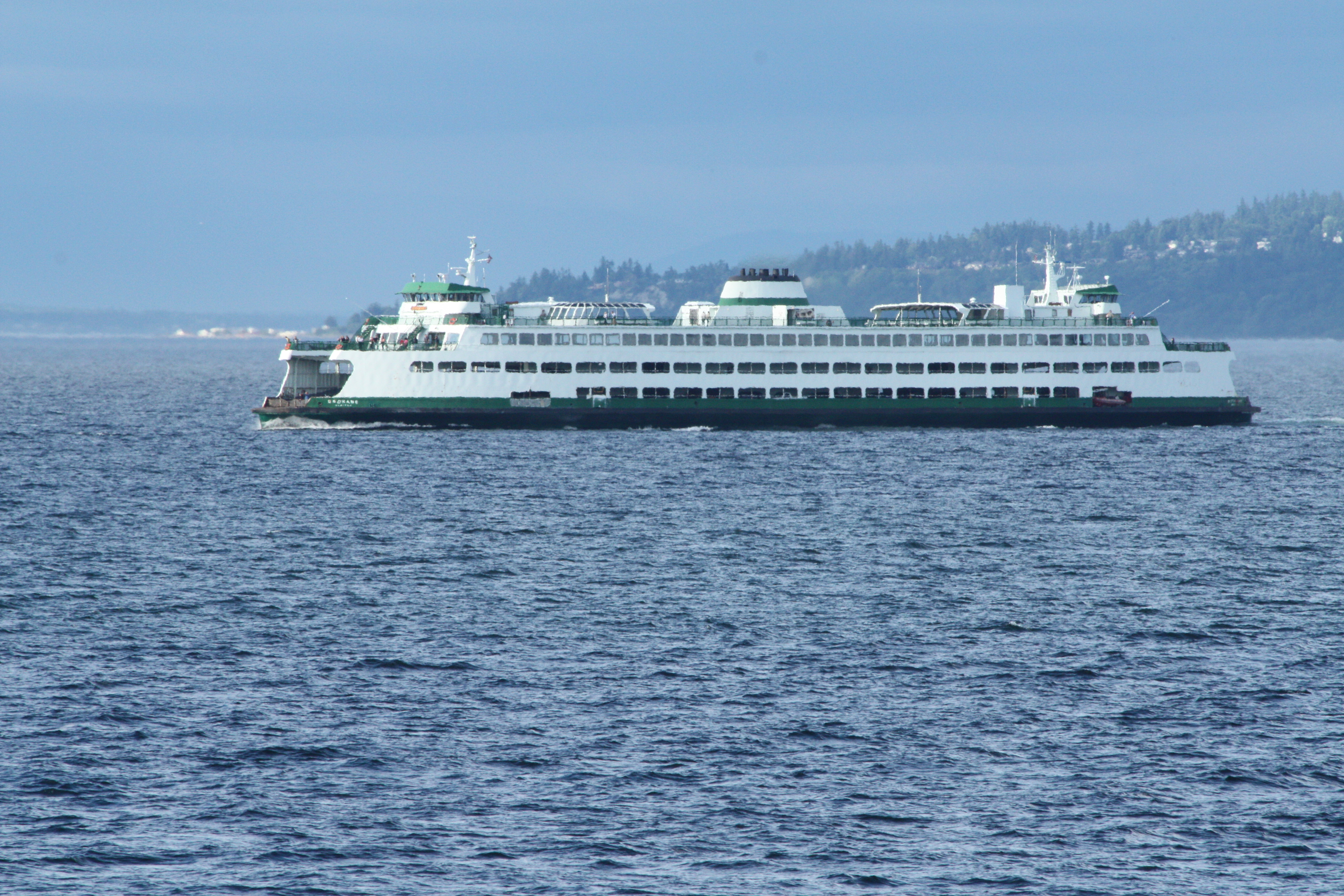
The Jumbo class MV Spokane serving the Edmonds–Kingston route in 2008.

SR 104 was established during the 1964 state highway renumbering as the successor to several state highways: SSH 9E between Discovery Bay and Port Gamble, PSH 21 between Port Gamble and Kingston, SSH 1W in Edmonds, and SSH 2B between Edmonds and Lake Forest Park. The highway between Port Gamble and Kingston was established in 1915 as part of State Road 21, which extended south to Bremerton. During the creation of the Primary and secondary state highways in 1937, State Road 21 was re-designated as PSH 21 and extended south to Gorst. SSH 9E was also established, connecting US 101 and PSH 9 in Discovery Bay to Port Ludlow, along with SSH 1W from US 99 and PSH 1 in Lynnwood through Edmonds to US 99 and PSH 1 in Woodway, following the route of an unpaved road built in the 1890s. SSH 2B was created in 1937 to serve as a connector between US 99 and PSH 1 in Shoreline to a branch of PSH 2 in Lake Forest Park.

SSH 9E was extended southeast to the South Point ferry over Hood Canal in 1947, as the ferry traveled east to a branch of PSH 21 at Lofall created in 1949. The highway was moved south from Discovery Bay to intersect US 101 near Crocker Lake in 1957 and was extended across the floating Hood Canal Bridge in 1959 to PSH 21 west of Port Gamble prior to the bridge opening on August 12, 1961. The westernmost section of the highway was straightened and redirected to an interchange with US 101 in November 1965.

SR 104 was designated over the highways in 1964 and was signed into law in 1970. The highway was widened and relocated onto a limited-access bypass between downtown Edmonds and Aurora Village in 1974, at a cost of $8 million. The bypass, which included an interchange at SR 99, was proposed in the 1960s and required several years of right-of-way acquisition. That same year, the state government studied a realignment of SR 104 east of I-5 to generally continue along the King–Snohomish county line to a junction with SR 527. The study concluded that an extension would likely be subject to litigation from local residents based on feedback from earlier meetings and would not provide major benefits.

The Hood Canal Bridge, officially named after highways director William A. Bugge, sank during the February 13, 1979 windstorm and was replaced by a ferry operating between Lofall and South Point until the west span was re-opened on October 23, 1982. The east span of the bridge was replaced between 1997 and 2010, closing the bridge to traffic in May 2009 and re-opening the South Point–Lofall ferry. The route of the highway has not been revised significantly since the 1994 inclusion of ferry routes.

The Edmonds–Kingston ferry, added to SR 104 in 1994, was first served by the 14-car and 76-passenger City of Edmonds in 1923. The ferry ran three crossings on weekdays and six on weekends and a toll of $1.50 for vehicles and $0.25 for passengers was later charged. After the establishment of Washington State Ferries in 1951, the 59-car MV Nisqually was assigned to the Edmonds–Kingston route. Between 1968 and 2005, the Evergreen State class MV Tillikum and MV Evergreen State were used on the route, while the Steel Electric class MV Illahee and MV Quinault were used on extra summer runs. The Jumbo class MV Spokane and MV Walla Walla began serving the route in 2005, but sometimes are replaced by other ferries, especially during maintenance.

== Spur route ==
State Route 104 Spur
- Location: Shoreline–Edmonds
- Length: 0.34 mi (550 m)
- Existed: 2009–present

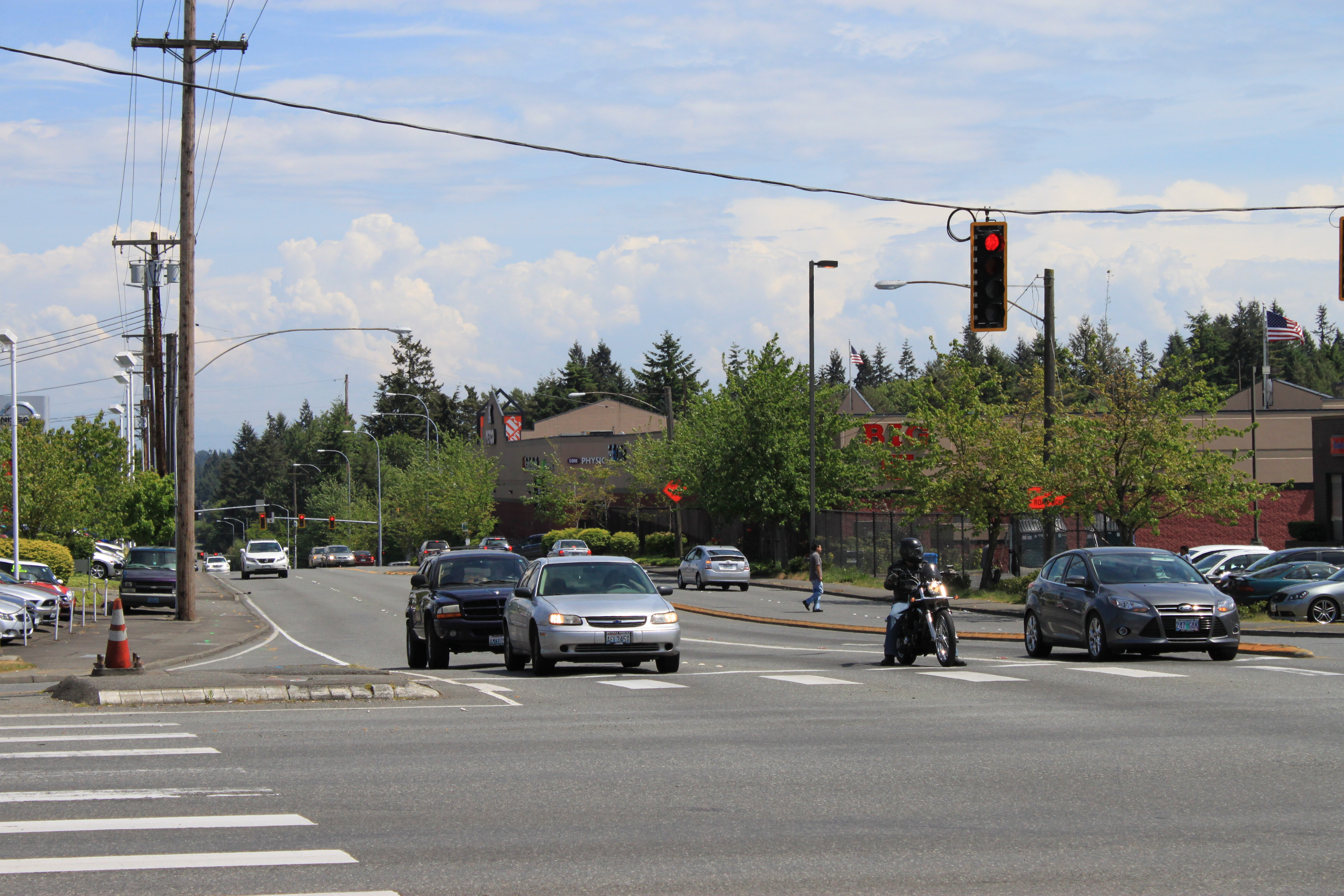
SR 104 Spur at its western terminus, SR 99, on the Snohomish–King county line.

SR 104 Spur begins its short, 0.34-mile-long (550 m) route as 244th Street at SR 104 on the Snohomish–King county line between Edmonds and Shoreline. 244th Street travels west on the 5-lane roadway (including a center turning lane) north of the Aurora Village shopping center to end at an intersection with Aurora Avenue, signed as SR 99. The highway was originally part of SSH 2B from 1937 to 1964 and SR 104 after the 1964 highway renumbering and was created in 2009 after SR 104 was realigned onto a new divided highway. WSDOT estimated that between 18,000 and 19,000 vehicles per day used the spur route, according to AADT data in 2011.

== Major intersections ==
County	Location	mi	km	Destinations	Notes
Jefferson		0.00	0.00	US 101 – Port Townsend, Port Angeles, Olympia	Western terminus; interchange
Jefferson		8.67	13.95	SR 19 north (Beaver Valley Road) – Chimacum, Port Townsend	Southern terminus of SR 19
Hood Canal		13.73– 14.53	22.10– 23.38	Hood Canal Bridge	
Kitsap		15.34	24.69	SR 3 south – Poulsbo, Bremerton	Northern terminus of SR 3
Kitsap		20.38	32.80	SR 307 south – Poulsbo	Northern terminus of SR 307
Puget Sound		24.40– 24.41	39.27– 39.28	Edmonds–Kingston Ferry; Mileage does not include ferry	
Snohomish	Edmonds	24.47	39.38	SR 524 east (Sunset Avenue) – Lynnwood	Western terminus of SR 524
Snohomish	Edmonds	25.09	40.38	SR 524 Spur east (Pine Street) to SR 524 east – Lynnwood	Southern terminus of SR 524 Spur
Snohomish	Woodway	25.51	41.05	5th Avenue – Edmonds City Center	Interchange; westbound exit and eastbound entrance
Snohomish–King county line	Edmonds–Shoreline city line	27.78	44.71	SR 99 (Aurora Avenue) – Lynnwood, Everett	Interchange
Snohomish–King county line	Edmonds–Shoreline city line	28.11	45.24	SR 104 Spur west (244th Street) to SR 99	Eastern terminus of SR 104 Spur
Snohomish–King county line	Mountlake Terrace–Shoreline city line	29.13	46.88	I-5 – Seattle, Everett, Vancouver, BC	I-5 exit 177; interchange.
King	Lake Forest Park	31.75	51.10	SR 522 (Bothell Way) – Bothell, Seattle	Eastern terminus
1.000 mi = 1.609 km; 1.000 km = 0.621 mi: Incomplete access
