= MV Tillikum =

Ferry built in 1959

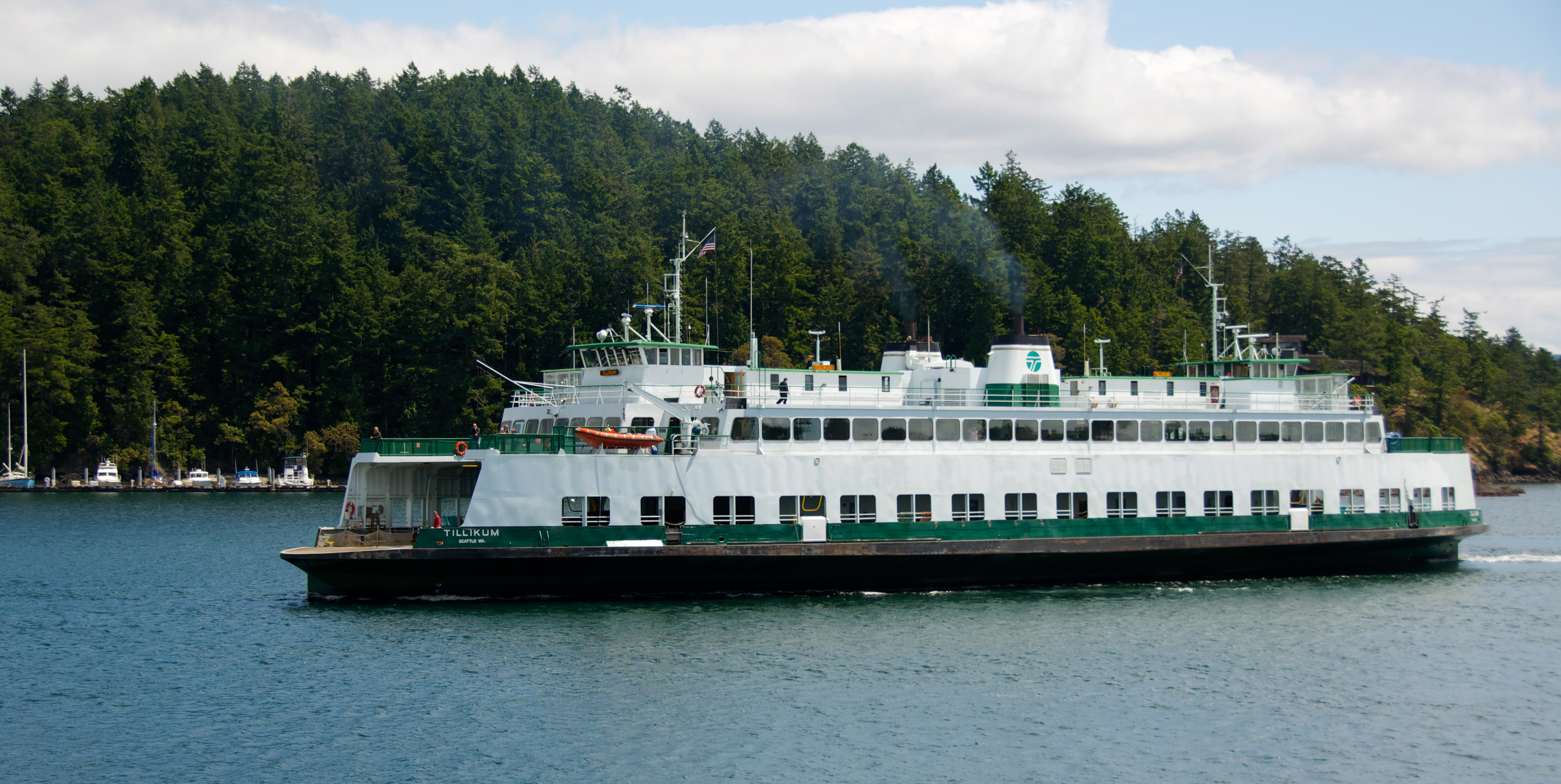
- Tillikum in 2017

History
- Name: Tillikum
- Owner: WSDOT
- Operator: Washington State Ferries
- Port of registry: Seattle, Washington, United States
- Builder: Puget Sound Bridge and Dredging Company
- Laid down: November 10, 1958
- Launched: April 1959
- Completed: 1959; Refit: 1994
- Identification: IMO number: 8836120; MMSI number: 366773090; Callsign: WL3377; Official Number: D278437
- Status: In Service

General characteristics
- Class & type: Evergreen State-class auto/passenger ferry
- Displacement: 2,413 long tons (2,452 t)
- Length: 310 ft 2 in (94.5 m)
- Beam: 73 ft 2 in (22.3 m)
- Draft: 15 ft 6 in (4.7 m)
- Decks: 3
- Deck clearance: 13 ft 6 in (4.1 m)
- Installed power: Total 2,500 hp (1,900 kW) from 2 diesel-electric engines
- Propulsion: Diesel-electric (AC)
- Speed: 13 knots (24 km/h; 15 mph)
- Capacity: 548 passengers; 87 vehicles (max 30 commercial)

The MV Tillikum is the sole remaining Evergreen State-class ferry operated by Washington State Ferries (WSF) and the oldest ferry operating in the WSF system.

== History ==
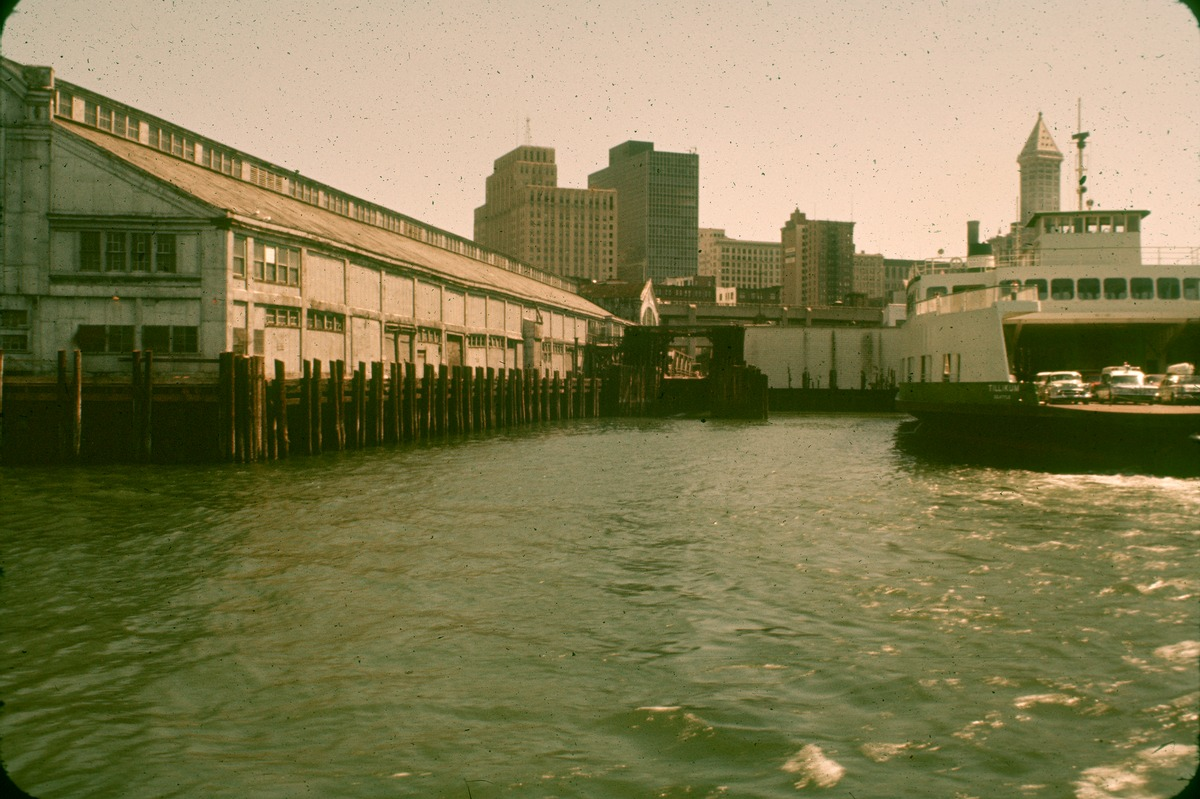
MV Tillikum at Colman Dock in 1963

The Tillikum entered service in April 1959 for the Seattle–Bainbridge Island route. Upon the delivery of the Super-class ferries in 1968, the Tillikum was moved to the Edmonds-Kingston run where it remained until approximately 1980. After being displaced by the Issaquah-class ferry Chelan in the early 1980s, the Tillikum spent roughly a decade as a relief boat before settling on the Fauntleroy-Vashon-Southworth run in the early 1990s. The Tillikum has become a reserve vessel since the delivery of the Samish in 2015. Since the retirement of its sister Klahowya in 2017, it has been serving primarily as the San Juan Inter-island vessel.
