= Woodway, Washington =

Woodway
- City
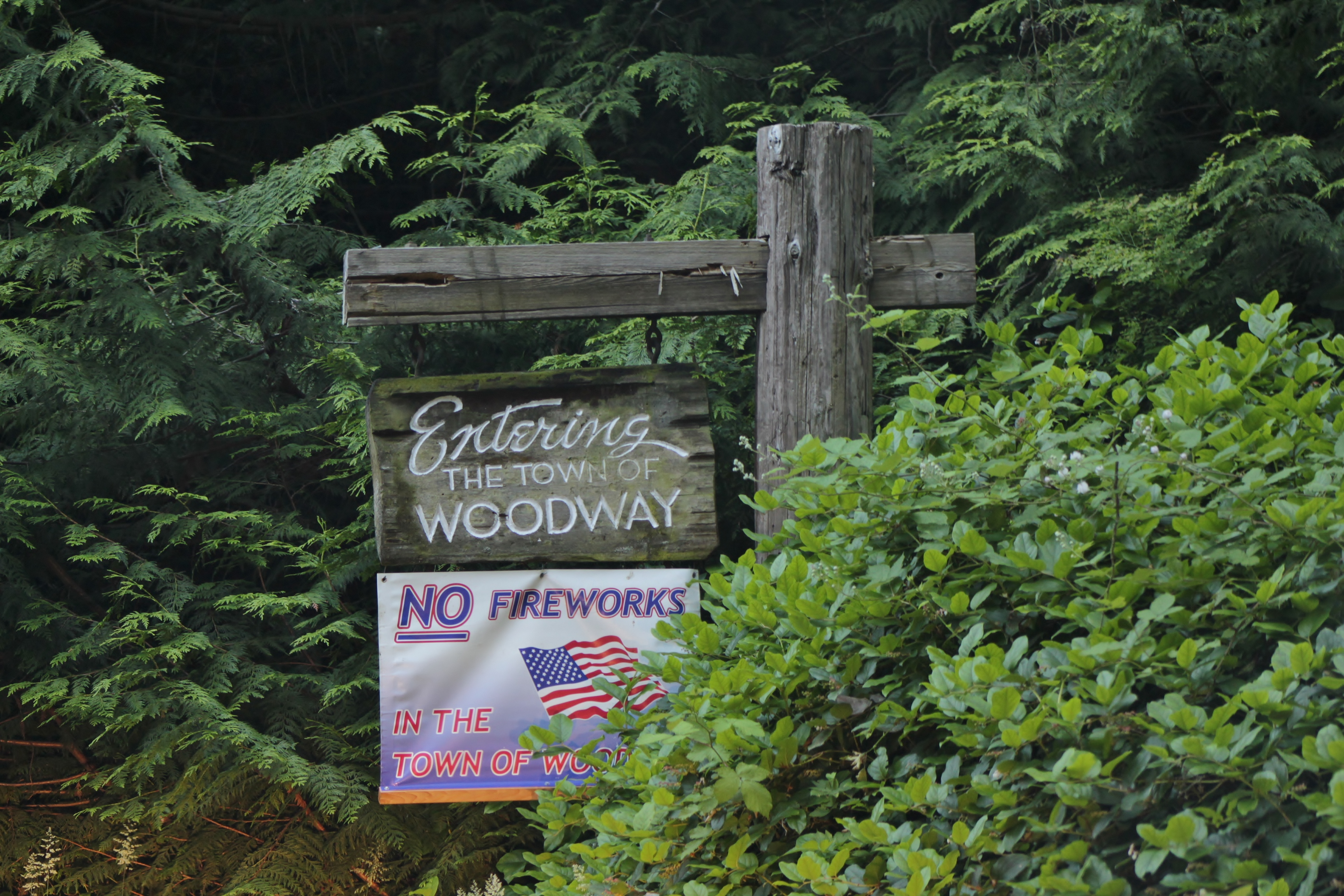
- Boundary sign
- Interactive map of Woodway
- Coordinates: 47°47′24″N 122°22′56″W
- Country: United States
- State: Washington
- County: Snohomish
- Incorporated: 1958

Government
  - Type: Mayor–council
  - Mayor: Mike Quinn

Area
  - Total: 1.43 sq mi (3.71 km^{2})
  - Land: 1.17 sq mi (3.03 km^{2})
  - Water: 0.26 sq mi (0.68 km^{2})
- Elevation: 203 ft (62 m)

Population (2020)
  - Total: 1,318
  - Estimate (2022): 1,305
  - Density: 1,128/sq mi (435.7/km^{2})
- Time zone: UTC-8 (Pacific (PST))
  - Summer (DST): UTC-7 (PDT)
- ZIP Code: 98020
- Area code,: 206, 425, 564
- FIPS code: 53-79835
- GNIS feature ID: 1512815
- Website: townofwoodway.com

Woodway is a city in Snohomish County, Washington, United States. The population was 1,318 at the 2020 census.

Based on per capita income, one of the more reliable measures of affluence, Woodway ranks sixth of 522 areas in the state of Washington to be ranked, and ranks first in Snohomish County.

== History ==
The community was founded in 1914 by attorney turned real estate developer David Whitcomb, who acquired 320 acres (130 ha) and began developing "Woodway Park". The city includes areas north and south of the original Woodway Park which offer one third acre lots and 1-acre (4,000 m^{2}) lots in addition to the 2-acre (8,100 m^{2}) lots in the park where the original secluded, wooded environment remains.

Woodway was officially incorporated on February 26, 1958, in an effort to protect the heavily forested area from development and avoid annexation by Edmonds. Lot sizes were deed restricted to a minimum of 2 acres (8,100 m^{2}) (though existing smaller lot sizes were grandfathered) and also mandated nunneries for lots larger than 10 acres (4.0 ha). as a way of grandfathering in the existing convent, Rosary Heights, mother house of the Edmonds Dominican Sisters (originally built as the estate of Boeing vice-president Philip G. Johnson). The city was named for its natural setting by a real estate developer. At that time, Woodway high school students attended the old Edmonds High school until the new Woodway High School was opened in 1970. In 1990, this school merged with Edmonds High School to create Edmonds Woodway High School.

Woodway was reclassified as a city in 1986, but continues to refer to itself as the Town of Woodway. It is served by the Edmonds post office, sharing the 98020 ZIP Code. Well into the 1980s, the city lacked businesses, sidewalks (except on parts of Woodway Park Road), and parks; it was almost entirely zoned for single-family homes, which were among the most expensive in Snohomish County. Its first major development since incorporation, the 94-home Woodway Highlands, was approved in 1999 following disputes between residents and the Central Puget Sound Growth Management Hearings Board. Its first homes were completed in 2003. As of 2021, no part of Woodway is zoned for commercial use.

Woodway is the only city in Snohomish County to have telephone numbers in the 206 area code, but some areas were switched to area code 425 in 1997. Landline phone numbers in Woodway originally shared LIncoln prefixes (542 and 546) with Richmond Beach, but PRospect prefixes (771, 774, 775, 776) shared with Edmonds were later added.

== Geography ==
Woodway is located at the southwestern edge of Snohomish County, bordered to the north and east by Edmonds and the south by Shoreline in King County. Puget Sound lies to the west of the town, including an unincorporated area known as Point Wells. The town sits on a bluff that overlooks Puget Sound; the BNSF Railway has railroad tracks along the shoreline, which was also home to a clothing-optional beach.

According to the United States Census Bureau, the city has a total area of 1.43 square miles (3.70 km^{2}), of which, 1.17 square miles (3.03 km^{2}) is land and 0.26 square miles (0.67 km^{2}) is water.

== Demographics ==
Historical population
| Census | Pop. | Note | %± |
|---|---|---|---|
| 1960 | 713 | | — |
| 1970 | 879 | | 23.3% |
| 1980 | 832 | | −5.3% |
| 1990 | 914 | | 9.9% |
| 2000 | 936 | | 2.4% |
| 2010 | 1,307 | | 39.6% |
| 2020 | 1,318 | | 0.8% |
| 2022 (est.) | 1,305 | | −1.0% |
U.S. Decennial Census

Woodway is the second least populated municipality in Snohomish County, ahead of Index, and had a population of 1,318 residents at the time of the 2020 census.

=== 2020 census ===
As of the 2020 census, there were 1,318 people and 457 households living in Woodway, which had a population density of 1,126.5 inhabitants per square mile (434.9/km^{2}). There were 476 total housing units, of which 96.0% were occupied and 4.0% were vacant or for occasional use. The racial makeup of the city was 79.7% White, 0.2% Native American and Alaskan Native, 0.8% Black or African American, 10.2% Asian, and 0.1% Native Hawaiian and Pacific Islander. Residents who listed another race were 0.7% of the population and those who identified as more than one race were 8.3% of the population. Hispanic or Latino residents of any race were 3.1% of the population.

Of the 457 households in Woodway, 74.4% were married couples living together and 1.5% were cohabitating but unmarried. Households with a male householder with no spouse or partner were 9.4% of the population, while households with a female householder with no spouse or partner were 14.7% of the population. Out of all households, 39.4% had children under the age of 18 living with them and 41.4% had residents who were 65 years of age or older. There were 457 occupied housing units in Woodway, of which 97.6% were owner-occupied and 2.4% were occupied by renters.

The median age in the city was 48.4 years old for all sexes, 46.3 years old for males, and 48.8 years old for females. Of the total population, 25.7% of residents were under the age of 19; 14.2% were between the ages of 20 and 39; 37.0% were between the ages of 40 and 64; and 22.9% were 65 years of age or older. The gender makeup of the city was 49.1% male and 50.9% female.

=== 2010 census ===
As of the 2010 U.S. census, there were 1,307 people, 448 households, and 373 families living in the city. The population density was 1,177.5 inhabitants per square mile (454.6/km^{2}). There were 466 housing units at an average density of 419.8 per square mile (162.1/km^{2}). The racial makeup of the city was 87.5% White, 0.6% African American, 0.8% Native American, 7.8% Asian, 0.6% from other races, and 2.7% from two or more races. Hispanic or Latino of any race were 2.7% of the population.

There were 448 households, of which 41.5% had children under the age of 18 living with them, 75.7% were married couples living together, 4.7% had a female householder with no husband present, 2.9% had a male householder with no wife present, and 16.7% were non-families. 12.9% of all households were made up of individuals, and 6.7% had someone living alone who was 65 years of age or older. The average household size was 2.90 and the average family size was 3.18.

The median age in the city was 45.8 years. 28.3% of residents were under the age of 18; 4.9% were between the ages of 18 and 24; 14.9% were from 25 to 44; 37.5% were from 45 to 64; and 14.4% were 65 years of age or older. The gender makeup of the city was 49.2% male and 50.8% female.

== Government and politics ==
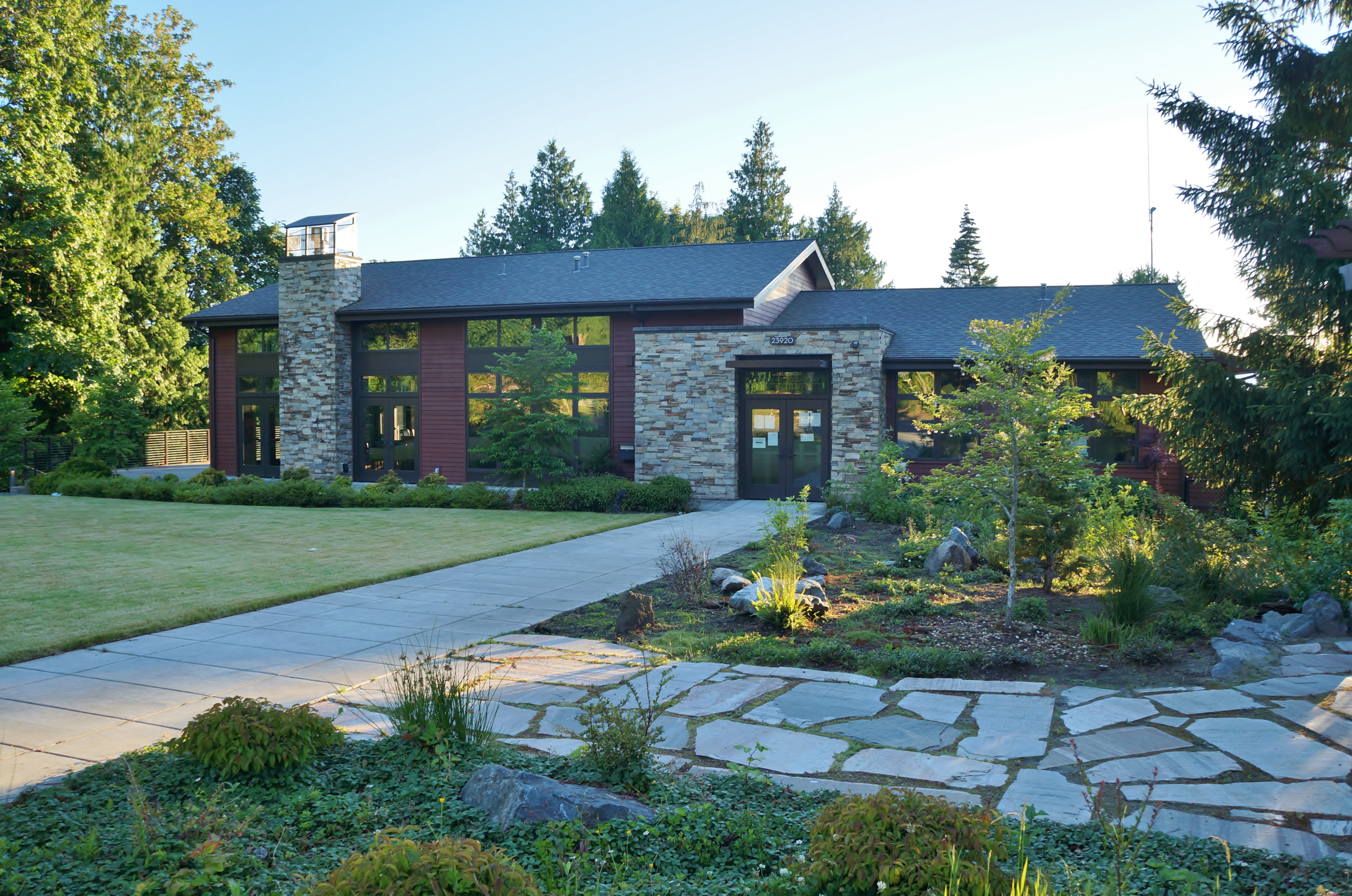
Woodway's town hall, opened in 2013

Woodway is an incorporated code city, but its official name remains the Town of Woodway. It has a mayor–council government with six elected officials on four-year terms: the mayor and five town councilmembers. Woodway's town hall was moved in 2013 to a new building designed by GGLO. Woodway is the only community in Snohomish County without public library service; residents have repeatedly voted against paying into the Sno-Isle Libraries system, with individuals citing high property taxes as their primary reason for opting out. Woodway residents could purchase Sno-Isle nonresident cards annually to access its resources prior to 2000, when it stopped issuing such cards.

At the federal level, Woodway is part of the 2nd congressional district, which encompasses western Snohomish County and the entirety of Island, Skagit, and Whatcom counties. From 2012 to 2022, it was part of the 7th congressional district along with Edmonds and most of Seattle. At the state level, the city is part of the 32nd legislative district, which also includes Lynnwood, Mountlake Terrace, Shoreline, and parts of Edmonds and Seattle. Woodway lies within the Snohomish County Council's 3rd district, which also includes Edmonds and Lynnwood.

== Culture ==
Parts of the 1986 NBC television series A Year in the Life was filmed at a home in Woodway.

== Infrastructure ==
=== Transportation ===
Woodway is served by State Route 104, which clips the city's northeast corner and connects it to the Edmonds ferry terminal and Interstate 5 (I-5) in Mountlake Terrace. The BNSF Railway's Scenic Subdivision runs along the city's western coastline and carries Sounder commuter rail service, which stops at Edmonds station. The city is part of the public transportation benefit area for Community Transit, but is not served by its buses; it is, however, part of the dial-a-ride service area for paratransit routes.

== Notable residents ==
- Morris Graves, artist
- Matt Cameron, musician
- Jeannette Wood, state legislator
