= MV Klahowya =

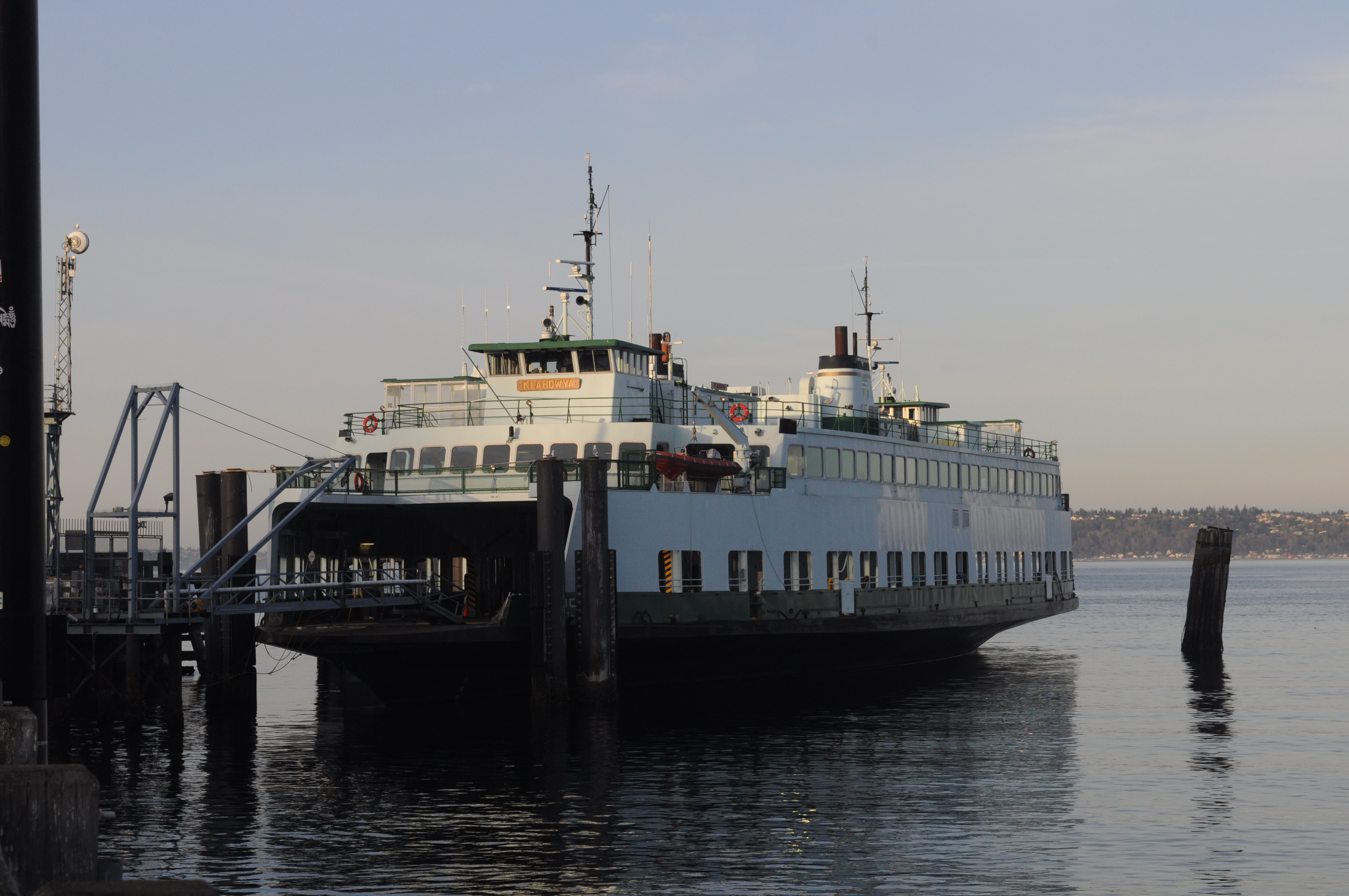

History
- Name: Klahowya
- Owner: WSDOT
- Operator: Washington State Ferries
- Port of registry: Seattle, Washington, United States
- Builder: Puget Sound Bridge and Dredging
- Completed: 1958; Refit: 1995
- In service: December 9, 1958
- Out of service: January 10, 2017
- Identification: IMO number: 8836209; MMSI number: 366773110; Callsign: WK7107; Official Number: D277872
- Status: Retired

General characteristics
- Class & type: Evergreen State-class auto/passenger ferry
- Displacement: 2,413 long tons (2,452 t)
- Length: 310 ft 2 in (94.5 m)
- Beam: 73 ft 2 in (22.3 m)
- Draft: 15 ft 6 in (4.7 m)
- Decks: 1 car deck 1 passenger deck 1 sun deck
- Deck clearance: 13 ft 10 in (4.2 m)
- Installed power: Total 2,500 hp (1,900 kW) from 2 × diesel-electric engines
- Propulsion: Diesel electric (AC/DC)
- Speed: 13 knots (24 km/h; 15 mph)
- Capacity: 800 passengers; 87 vehicles (max 30 commercial)
- Crew: 10

The MV Klahowya was an Evergreen State-class ferry that was operated by Washington State Ferries. The vessel's name comes from Chinook Jargon and means "greetings."

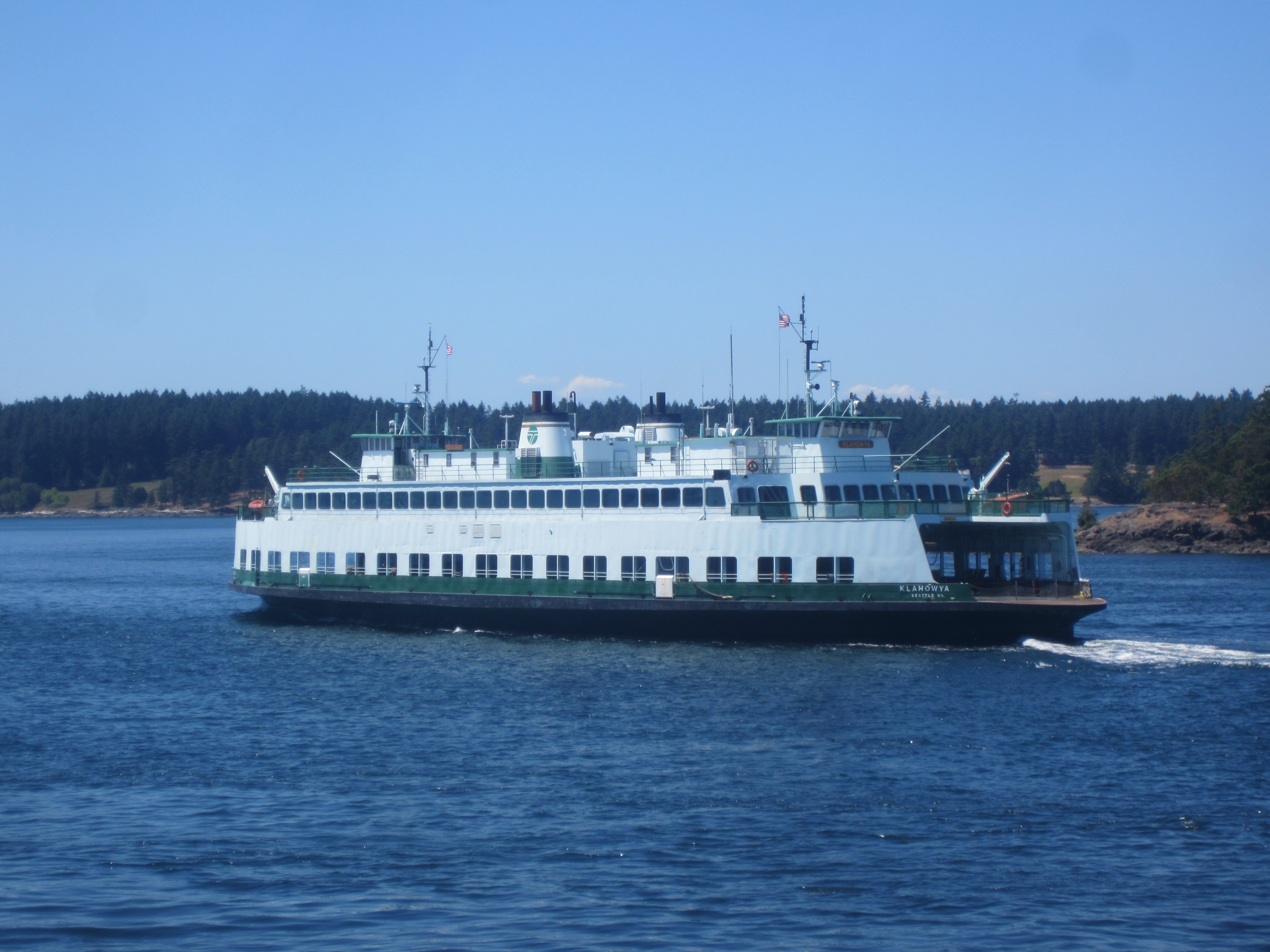
The MV Klahowya passing the MV Chelan in Upright Channel.

The Klahowya served nearly all of her career on the Fauntleroy-Vashon-Southworth run before being moved to the San Juans to replace her sister ship, MV Evergreen State, which was to be retired. In early 2008, and again in August 2012, she did short stints on the Inter-Island run due to a vessel shortage. She was moved to the Inter-Island route on June 30, 2014, and remained there until her retirement on January 10, 2017.

On August 16, 2024, the Washington State Department of Transportation (WSDOT) announced that the decommissioned Elwha and Klahowya would be sold for $100,000 each to Ecuadorian businessman Nelson Armas. The ferries would be scrapped and recycled in a "clean [and] green" facility in Ecuador after being towed from Eagle Harbor on Bainbridge Island. The two vessels were towed out into Elliott Bay on August 19 to begin their 35-day trip to Ecuador, but a malfunction with the towing equipment caused the trip to be postponed; the Elwha and Klahowya returned to Eagle Harbor. The crew on the tugboat were detained by U.S. Customs and Border Protection on August 30 after their work visas had expired. The sale of the two ferries was cancelled on September 5 after more issues with the tugboat and allegations of poor working conditions were disclosed; Armas forfeited the entire cost of the sale per the contract's terms.
