= Edmonds–Kingston ferry =

Ferry route in the U.S. state of Washington

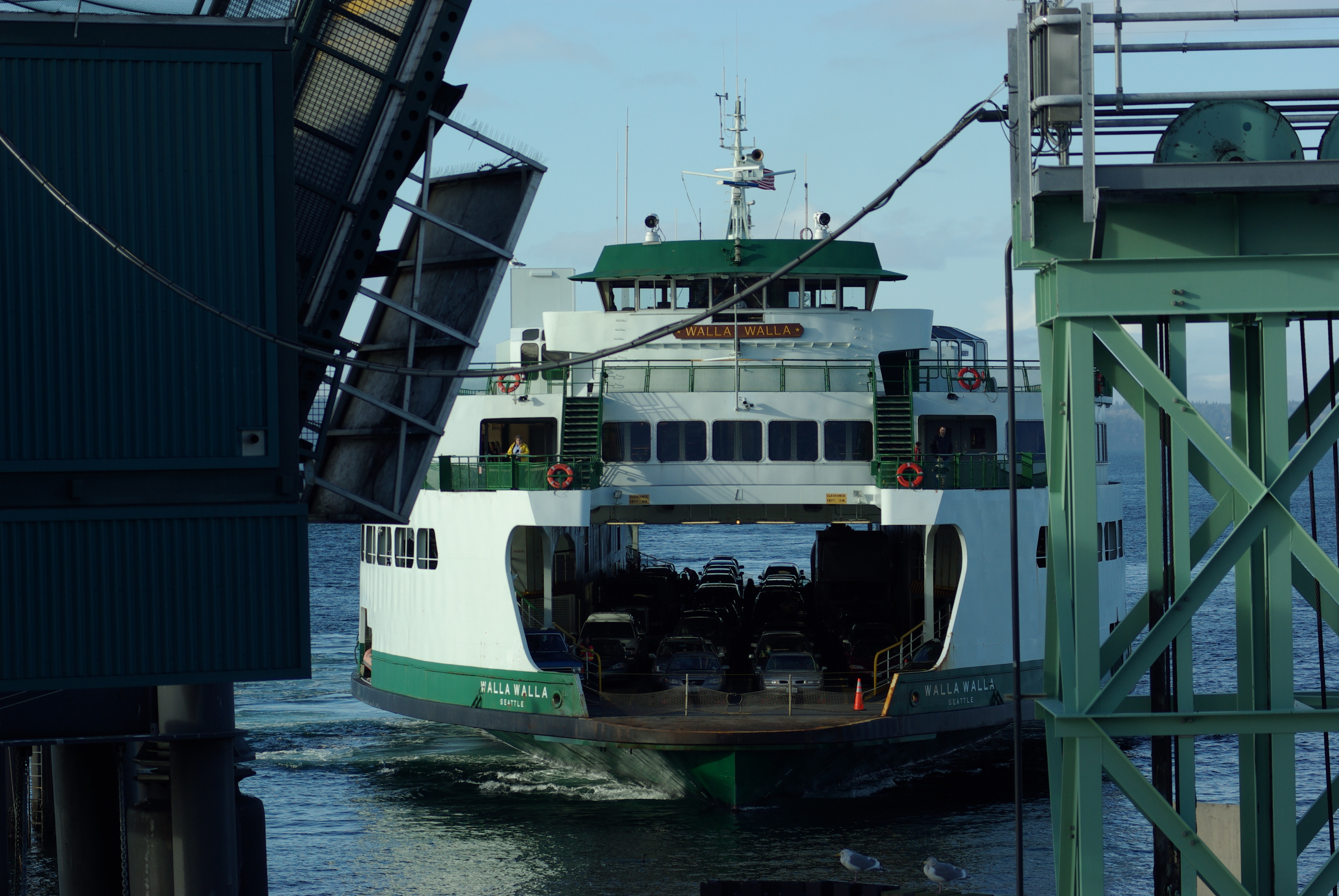
- Walla Walla approaching Edmonds ferry terminal
- Waterway: Puget Sound
- Route: Edmonds – Kingston, Washington
- Carries: Washington State Route 104
- Authority: Washington State Ferries (1951-present).
- Travel time: approx. 30 minutes (2018)
- Connections at Edmonds
- Train: Edmonds Station
- Bus: Community Transit
- Road: SR 104 / SR 524
- Connections at Kingston
- Bus: Kitsap Transit
- Road: SR 104

The Edmonds–Kingston ferry is a ferry route across Puget Sound between Edmonds and Kingston, Washington. Since 1951 the only ferries employed on the route have belonged to the Washington state ferry system, currently the largest ferry system in the United States. The last regularly operated steam ferry on the West Coast of the United States made its final run on this route in 1969.

== Description ==
The route crosses the Puget Sound with Edmonds, Washington as the eastern terminus and Kingston, Washington as the western terminus. The crossing is generally 30 minutes from either terminal.

== History ==
After 1951, the main ferry on the route was the MV Nisqually (capacity: 616 passengers; 59 automobiles), with the steam ferry Shasta operating as a reserve boat. Other ferries used on the route were the Klahanie, the steam ferry San Mateo, and the Evergreen-class motor ferry MV Evergreen State (capacity: 981 passengers, 87 autos).

In 1968 the Evergreen-class ferry MV Tillikum (capacity: 1,200 passengers, 87 autos) was assigned as the regular boat on the route. On Labor Day 1969, the San Mateo became the last steam ferry on the West Coast of the United States to run a regular route.

By the early 1970s, the relief vessels on the run included MV Illahee and MV Quinault. Another vessel sometimes used on extra summer runs in the early 1970s was the MV Kehloken.

== Terminals ==
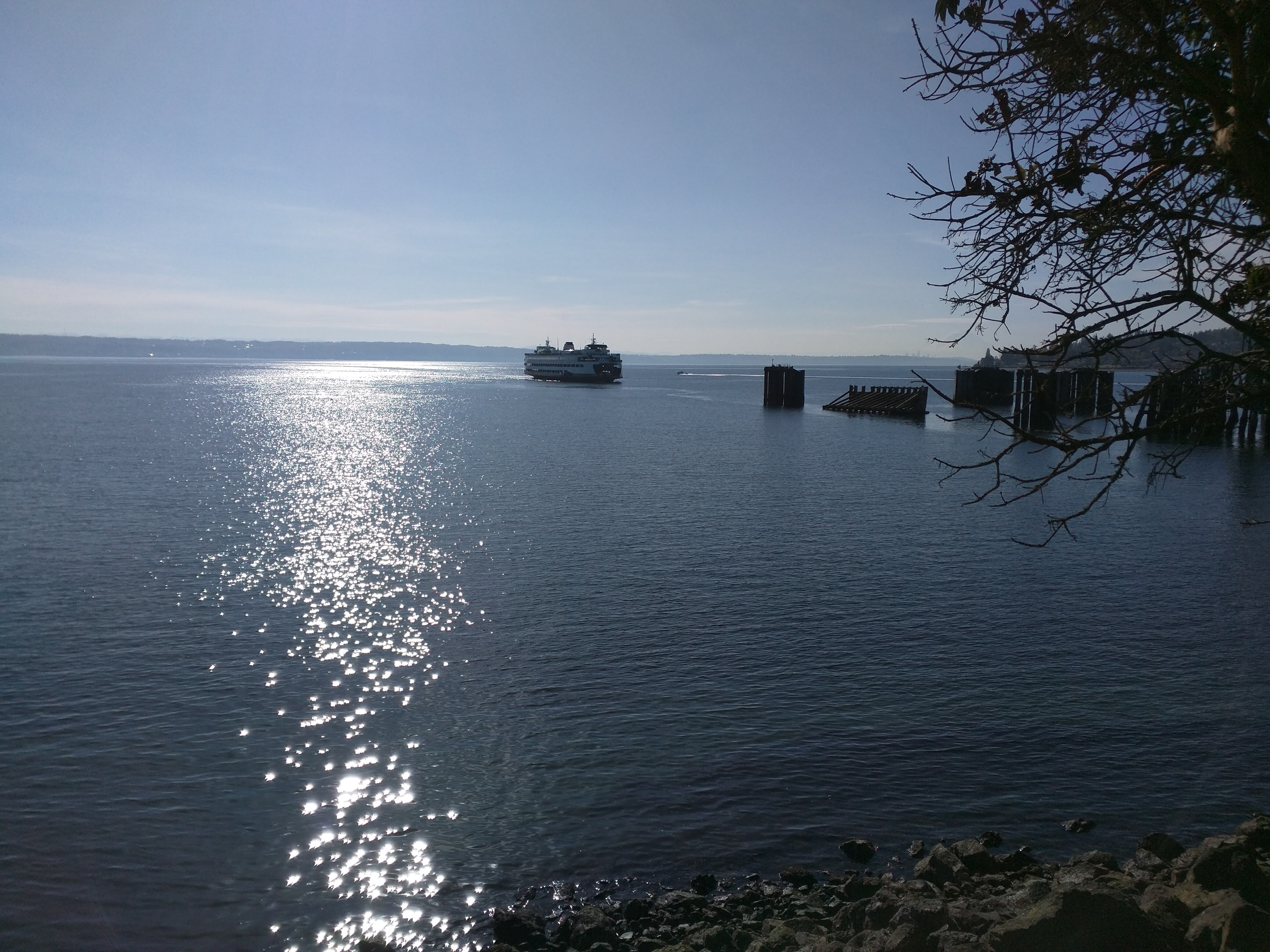
Ferry arriving at the Kingston terminal

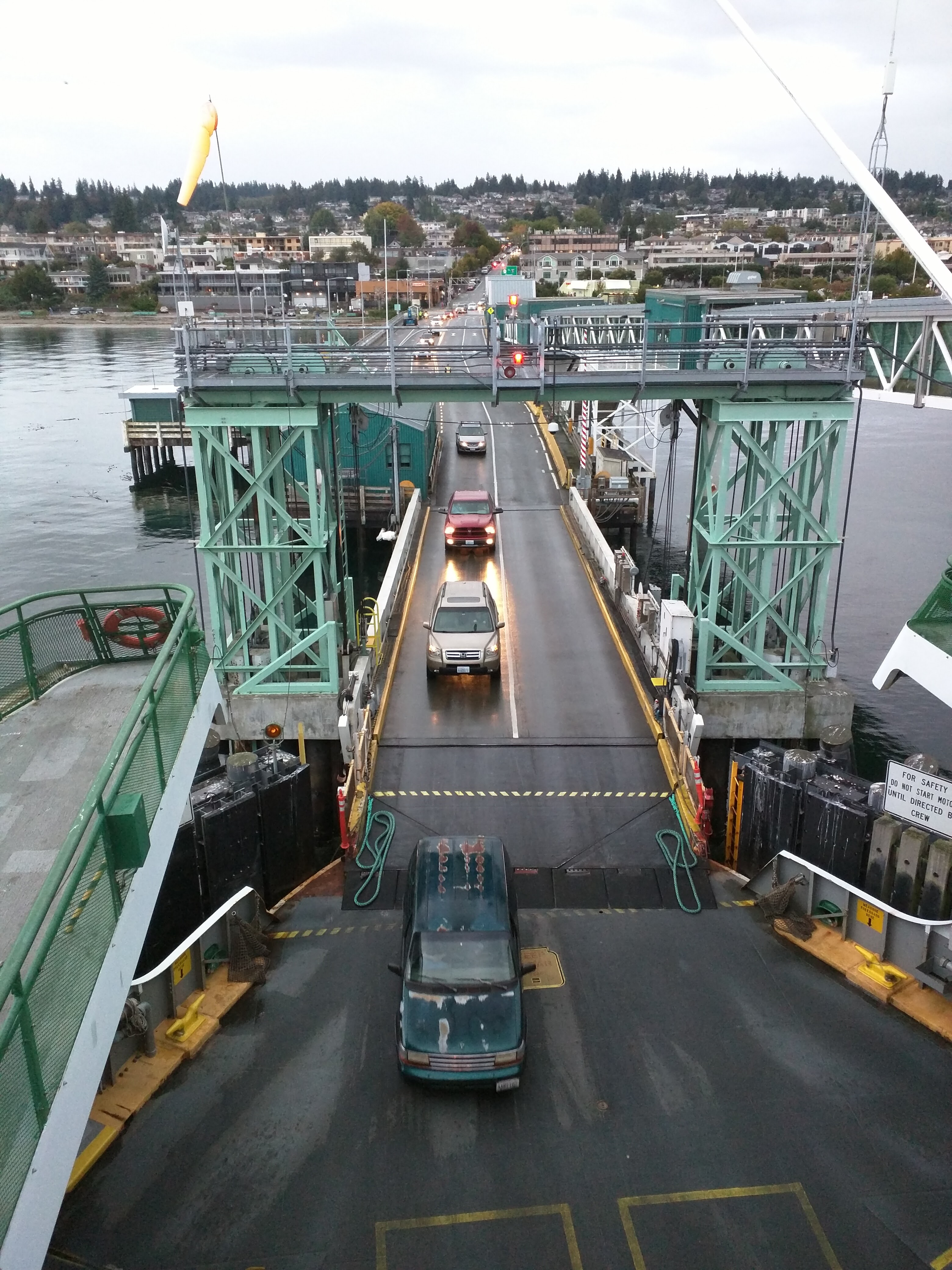
Loading vehicles at the Edmonds ferry terminal

Both terminals at Edmonds and Kingston are equipped with overhead passenger loading. Edmonds is equipped with one vehicle slip, while Kingston is equipped with two. There is also a passenger-only dock at Kingston. It was previously used for the Soundrunner, a passenger only fast-ferry service to Seattle that the Port of Kingston operated between Fall 2010 and Fall 2012. The dock was utilized again starting in November 2018 when Kitsap Transit resumed passenger only fast-ferry service to Seattle with MV Finest.

The Kingston terminal has an extra slip for a spare boat, which was regularly used for a third vessel until the 1970s. In recent years, the spare slip has been used when three vessel service is in place on the Edmonds-Kingston route, usually due to reduced vessel capacity or the suspension of an adjacent run. The spare slip has also been used for storage of vessels when all the slips at the Eagle Harbor maintenance facility are full.

== Current status ==
Beginning in 1999, the vessels normally assigned to the route are the Jumbo class ferry MV Spokane and the Jumbo Mark II class ferry MV Puyallup. The Jumbo class ferry MV Walla Walla is frequently assigned when either of the regular boats is out of service or required elsewhere.

As of August 2025, the vessels operating the route included the Jumbo class ferries MV Walla Walla and MV Spokane.

== See also ==
- Washington State Ferries
- Ferries in Washington State
