= Jeannette Wood =

American politician (1932–2021)

Member of the Washington Senate from the 21st district
- In office November 23, 1994 – January 11, 1999
- Preceded by: Gary A. Nelson
- Succeeded by: Paull Shin

Member of the Washington House of Representatives from the 21st district
- In office July 27, 1988 – November 23, 1994
- Preceded by: Katie Allen
- Succeeded by: Jerry Blanton

Personal details
- Born: February 19, 1932 Auburn, New York, U.S.
- Died: January 9, 2021 (aged 88) Woodway, Washington, U.S.
- Party: Republican

Jeannette Wood (February 19, 1932 – January 9, 2021) was an American politician who served in the Washington House of Representatives from the 21st district from 1988 to 1994 and in the Washington State Senate from the 21st district from 1994 to 1999. Wood graduated from Cornell University. She served on the Woodway, Washington city council and as mayor of Woodway.

She died of dementia on January 9, 2021, at age 88, in Woodway, Washington.
