= USS Mitchell =

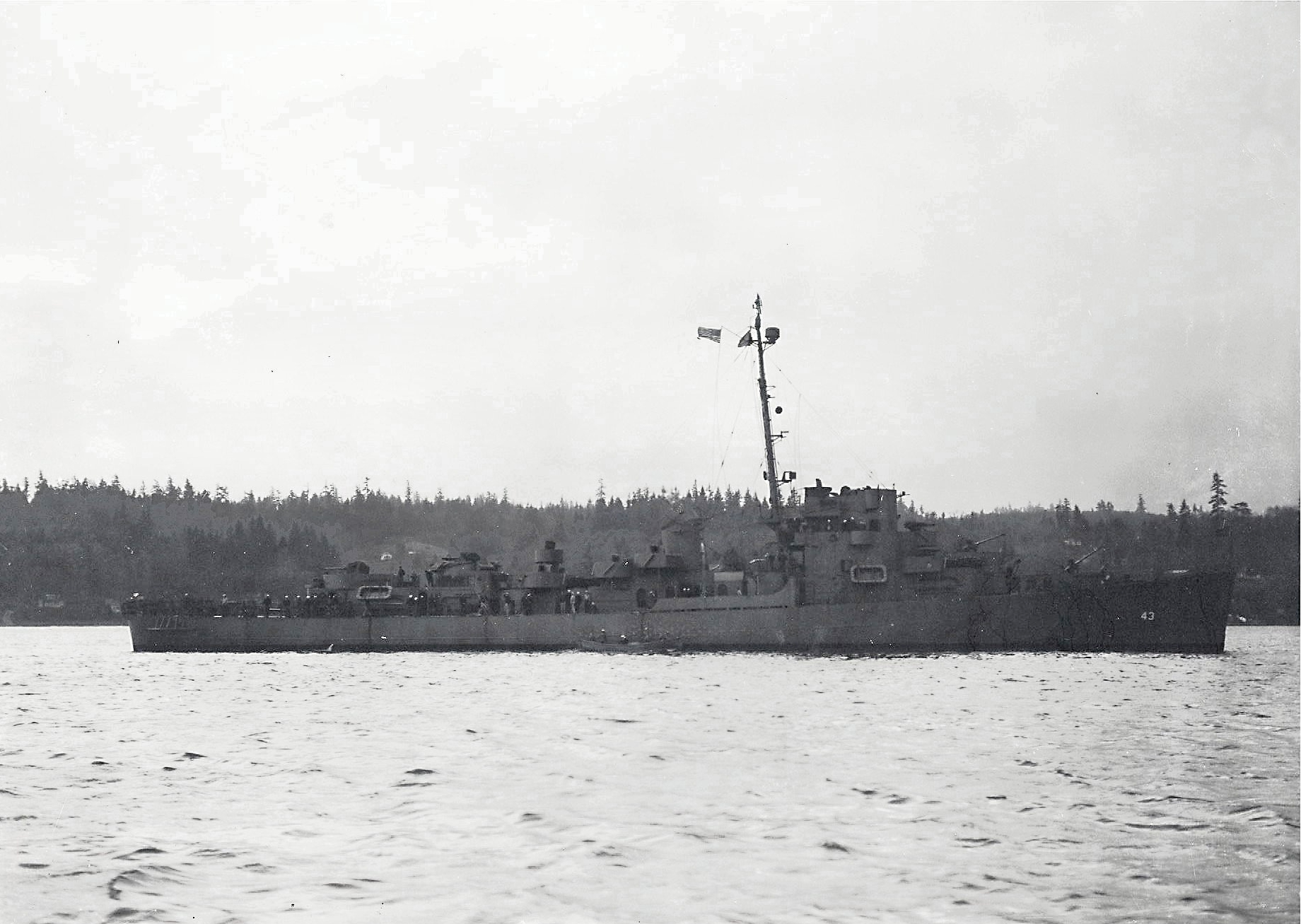
- Mitchell underway on 1 December 1943

History

United States
- Name: USS Mitchell
- Builder: Puget Sound Navy Yard
- Laid down: 12 January 1943, as BDE-43 for the United Kingdom
- Launched: 1 August 1943
- Commissioned: 17 November 1943
- Decommissioned: 29 December 1945
- Renamed: USS Mitchell, 16 June 1943
- Stricken: 19 December 1945
- Honors and awards: 9 battle stars (World War II)
- Fate: Sold for scrapping, 11 December 1946

General characteristics
- Type: Evarts-class destroyer escort
- Displacement: 1,140 long tons (1,158 t) standard; 1,430 long tons (1,453 t) full
- Length: 289 ft 5 in (88.21 m) o/a; 283 ft 6 in (86.41 m) w/l
- Beam: 35 ft 2 in (10.72 m)
- Draft: 11 ft (3.4 m) (max)
- Propulsion: 4 × General Motors Model 16-278A diesel engines with electric drive, 6,000 shp (4,474 kW); 2 screws
- Speed: 19 knots (35 km/h; 22 mph)
- Range: 4,150 nmi (7,690 km)
- Complement: 15 officers and 183 enlisted
- Armament: 3 × single 3"/50 Mk.22 dual purpose guns; 1 × quad 1.1"/75 Mk.2 AA gun; 9 × 20 mm Mk.4 AA guns; 1 × Hedgehog Projector Mk.10 (144 rounds); 8 × Mk.6 depth charge projectors; 2 × Mk.9 depth charge tracks

USS Mitchell (DE-43) was an Evarts-class destroyer escort constructed for the United States Navy during World War II. She was sent off into the Pacific Ocean to protect convoys and other ships from Japanese submarines and fighter aircraft. She performed escort and anti-submarine operations in dangerous battle areas and was awarded nine battle stars, a very high number for a ship of her type.

== Design ==
The Evarts-class destroyer escorts were 289 ft 5 in (88.21 m) long overall, and they had a beam of 35 ft 2 in (10.72 m). They had an average draft of 10 ft 1 in (3.07 m) at their full load displacement of 1,416 long tons (1,439 t). Each ship had a normal crew numbered 156 officers and sailors.

Mitchell was propelled by a pair of diesel motors manufactured by General Motors, which drove a pair of screw propellers. Her propulsion system was rated to produce 6,000 brake horsepower (4,500 kW) for a top speed of 19.5 knots (36.1 km/h; 22.4 mph). Oil storage amounted to between 131 and 197 long tons (133 and 200 t), which allowed a cruising radius of up to 6,000 nautical miles (11,000 km; 6,900 mi) at an economical pace of 10 knots (19 km/h; 12 mph).

The ship's armament consisted of a main battery of three 3-inch (76 mm) /50-caliber guns in individual pivot mounts, which could be used against air or surface targets. These were supported by a light anti-aircraft battery that initially consisted of four 1.1 in (28 mm) /75-caliber guns in a quadruple mount and nine 20 mm (0.79 in) Oerlikon guns. For attacks against submarines, the ship was equipped with a Hedgehog mortar, eight depth charge throwers, and two depth charge racks.

== Service history ==
She was originally laid down as BDE-43 on 12 January 1943 by the Puget Sound Navy Yard for transfer to the United Kingdom upon completion. However, she was ordered retained for service in the U.S. Navy. She was reclassified DE-43 on 16 June and renamed Mitchell on 23 June. Alfred Mitchell, the ship's namesake, was a naval aviator killed in the Battle of Dutch Harbor on June 1942. The ship was launched on 1 August 1943, sponsored by the widow of the namesake. Mitchell was commissioned on 17 November 1943.

After shakedown and training off San Diego, California, Mitchell participated in the "Battle of San Clemente", a simulated invasion San Clemente Island off the coast of Los Angeles, California. The simulation was designed to be a "dress rehearsal" for the invasion of the Marshall Islands. Mitchell then sailed on 2 February 1944 as part of the escort of a convoy of eight liberty ships sailing to Hawaii. Arriving Pearl Harbor on 10 February, Mitchell spent the next four months operating with American submarines in Task Force 16, Service Force Pacific Fleet.

On 28 July 1944, Mitchell escorted an oiler to Agat Bay, Guam, to aid naval forces in the Battle of Guam (1944). The crew looked on as cruisers and destroyers shelled the beach and ridge, while dive bombers attacked the Orote Peninsula. The American forces would go on to recapture the island, and Mitchell was awarded its first battlestar for its support role.

In August 1944 Mitchell was assigned to the Third Fleet Logistics Group as part of a screen for oilers and escort carriers. On 30 August 1944, Mitchell made its first of many crossings of the Equator. When this happens, a line-crossing ceremony is held on deck to honor both the crew and "Neptunus Rex", also known as King Neptune, ancient Roman god of the sea. Prior to crossing the Equator, a sailor is colloquially referred to as a "pollywog"; during this ceremony, all polliwogs are "promoted" to shellbacks, and formally welcomed into Neptune's realm.

In November 1944, Mitchell made its first of many visits to the naval base at Ulithi Atoll, located in the Caroline Islands. At the time, Ulithi served as the forward operating base for the US Navy Pacific Operations; its harbor could fit up to 700 ships at once, a capacity that surpasses both Pearl Harbor and Majuro. Repair ships, distilling ships, ice cream barges, and floating dry docks filled the central harbor. Mog Mog island, in the north of the atoll, served as a recreation center for the men on the island; baseball fields, an outdoor theater, a 500-seat chapel, and other facilities were constructed. After the capture of Leyte Gulf in October 1944, the Navy began moving its forward operations base to the Philippines and Ulithi was slowly abandoned by the Navy and soon forgotten. Although few civilians ever heard of Ulithi or the vital role it played, for approximately 7 months Ulithi served as the busiest anchorage in the world and was pivotal in the American victory in the Pacific.

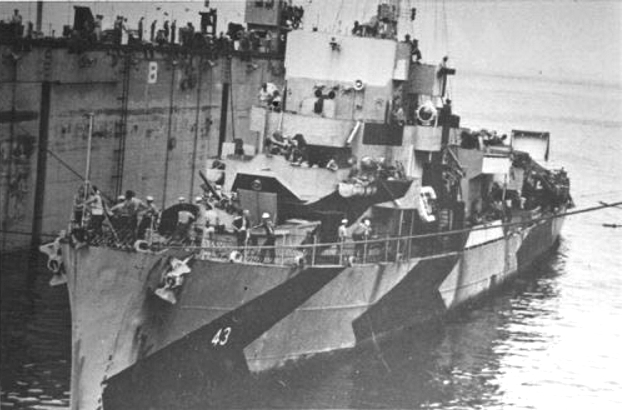
USS Mitchell entering dry dock, circa 1944.

On 3 December 1944 Mitchell struck a whale while operating northeast of Luzon, screening ships and sinking mines. The collision seriously damaged her underwater sound equipment and forced her to retire back to Ulithi for repairs in floating drydock auxiliary repair dock USS ARD-15. Such an accident was common for Navy ships during World War 2, in both the Pacific and Atlantic oceans.

Mitchell was soon back in action; on 21 February 1945 her deck log reported: "Steaming toward rendezvous point southeast of Iwo Jima." As U.S. Marines landed on Okinawa under cover of naval gunfire, Mitchell performed escort and patrol missions. A few weeks later she was a screening vessel in Rear Admiral W. D. Sample's Task Group 78.4 which attacked and occupied Balikpapan, Borneo, on 6 July 1945. As part of Task Group 30.8, she then helped to protect convoys supplying the occupation of Japan during the months of August and September 1945. On 5 September Mitchell briefly joined American ships in Tokyo Harbor. She weighed anchor on the 18th for the United States via Eniwetok and Pearl Harbor, arriving San Francisco on 8 October.

Her last time underway as a commissioned naval vessel was on 6 November when she moved to Kaiser's Victory Yard, Richmond, California. Mitchell was decommissioned there and struck from the Navy List on 29 December 1945. She was sold for scrapping and delivered to the purchaser, the Puget Sound Navigation Company of Seattle, Washington, on 11 December 1946. Her engines were used to power MV Evergreen State, operated by Washington State Ferries from 1954 to 2015.

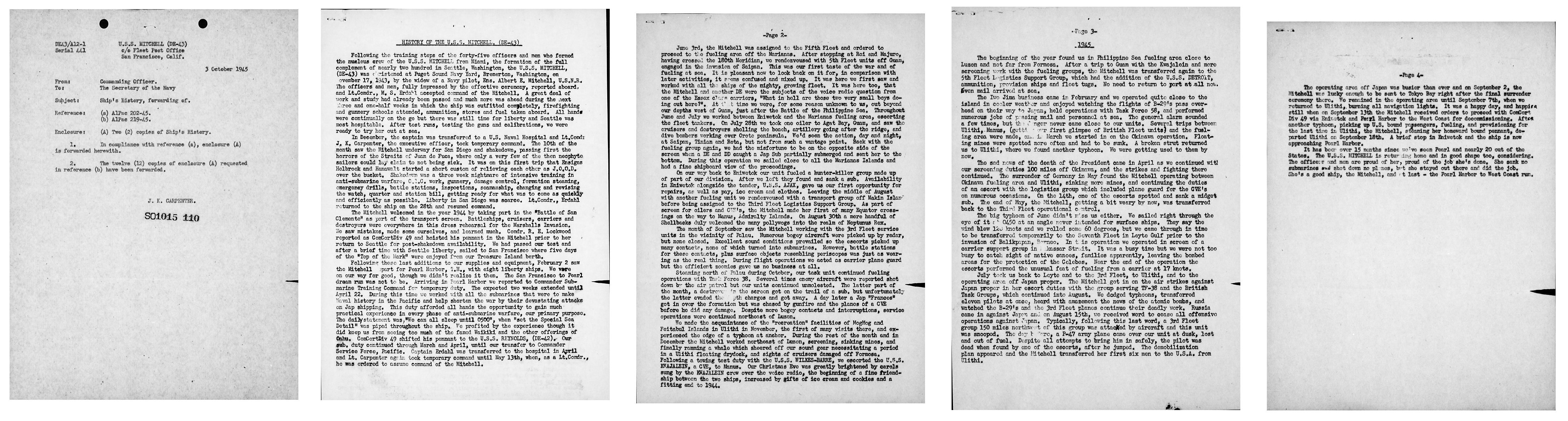
Complete War History of USS Mitchell, written by Lieutenant Commander JK Carpenter in 1945.

== Honors and awards ==
Mitchell received nine battle stars for World War II service.

- American Campaign Medal
- Asiatic-Pacific Campaign Medal (with nine service stars)
- World War II Victory Medal

== See also ==
- USS Slater, a museum ship in Albany, NY dedicated to the history of destroyer escorts including Mitchell
