= Evergreen State-class ferry =

Auto/passenger ferries operated by Washington State

Evergreen State-class
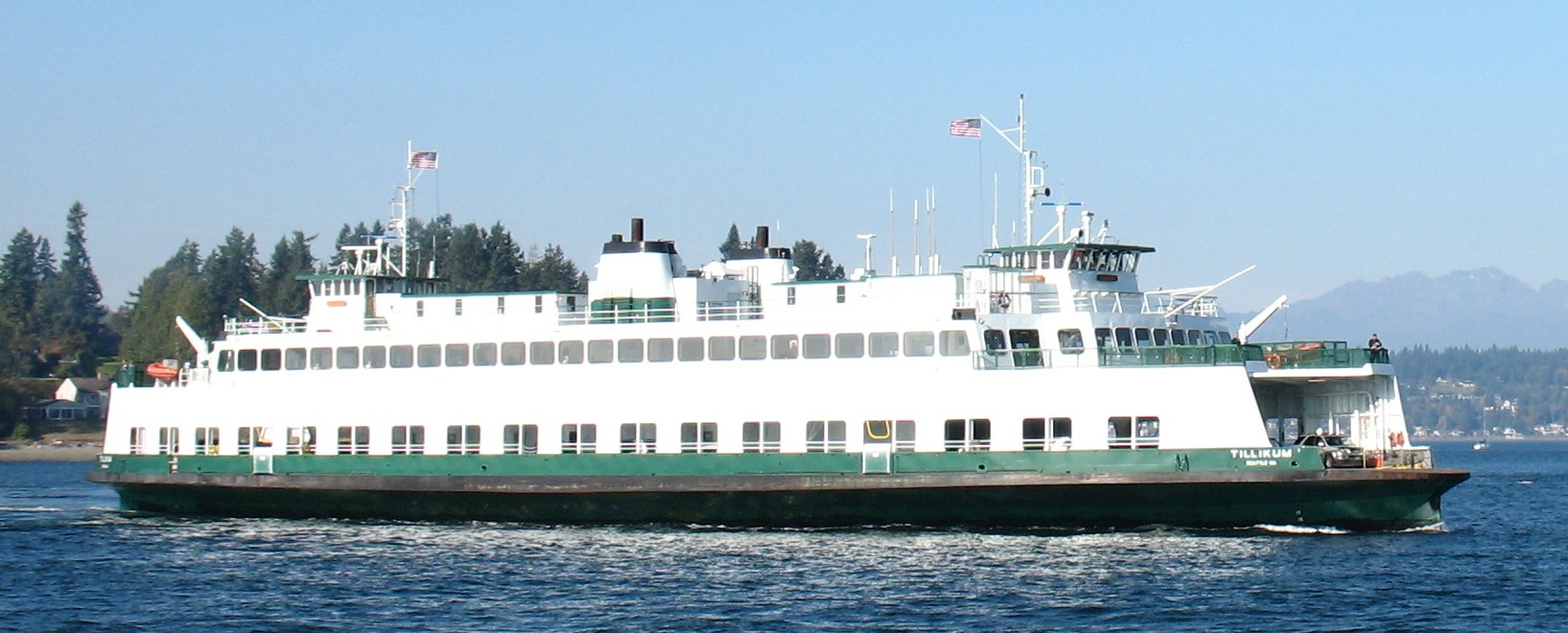
- MV Tillikum, one of the Evergreen State-class ferries

Class overview
- Builders: Puget Sound Dredge and Bridge Company
- Operators: Washington State Ferries
- Succeeded by: Olympic-class ferry
- Built: 1954-1959
- In service: 1954-present
- Completed: 3
- Active: 1
- Retired: 2

General characteristics
- Type: Auto/passenger ferry
- Tonnage: 2,041 long tons (4,572,000 lb)
- Length: 310 ft (94 m)
- Beam: 73 ft (22 m)
- Draft: 15 ft 10 in (4.83 m)
- Decks: 1 auto; 1 passenger
- Deck clearance: 13 ft 7 in (4.14 m)
- Installed power: 2,500 hp (1,900 kW)
- Propulsion: Diesel-electric
- Speed: 13 knots (24 km/h; 15 mph) (service); 16 knots (30 km/h; 18 mph) (maximum)
- Capacity: 87 cars; 800-1,092 passengers

The Evergreen State-class ferries was a class of three ferries built by the Puget Sound Dredge and Bridge Company for Washington State Ferries beginning in 1953. This class was the first built after the state agency was created in 1951. Each Evergreen State-class ferry originally carried 100 cars and 1000 passengers.

The Evergreen State-class ferries include:

- MV Evergreen State (Retired)
- MV Klahowya (Retired)
- MV Tillikum
