= Jumbo-class ferry =

Auto/passenger ferries operated by Washington State

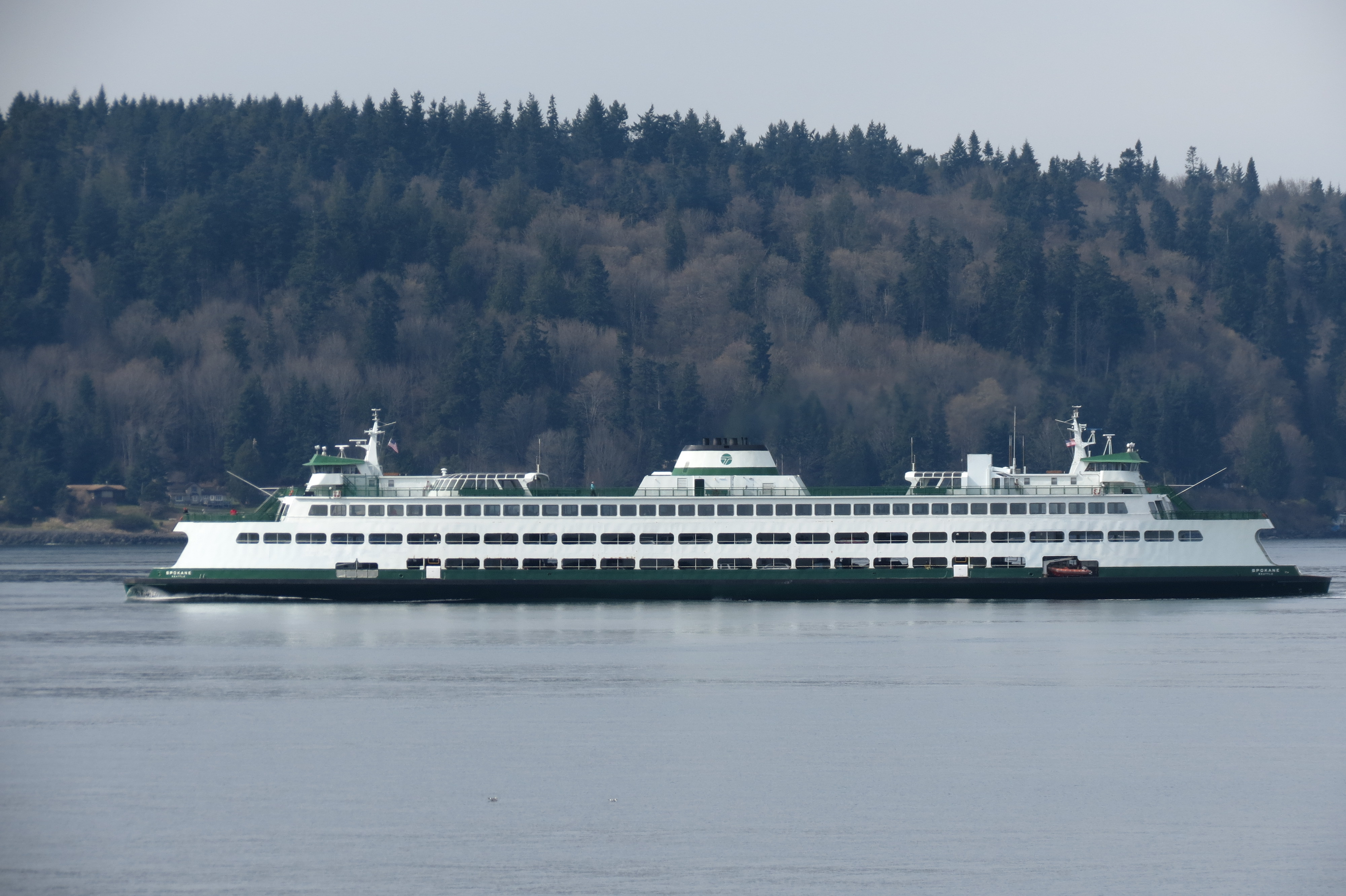
- Jumbo-class ferry MV Spokane, 2013

Class overview
- Builders: Todd Shipyards, Seattle, Washington
- Operators: Washington State Ferries
- Preceded by: Super class
- Succeeded by: Jumbo Mark II class
- Built: 1972
- In service: 1973–present
- Planned: 4
- Completed: 2
- Canceled: 2
- Active: 2

General characteristics
- Type: Auto/passenger ferry
- Tonnage: 3,246 GT
- Displacement: 4,859 long tons (4,937 t)
- Length: 440 ft (130 m)
- Beam: 87 ft (27 m)
- Draft: 18 ft (5.5 m)
- Deck clearance: 15 ft 8 in (4.78 m)
- Installed power: 11,500 hp (8,576 kW) total from four diesel engines
- Propulsion: Diesel–electric
- Speed: 18 knots (33 km/h; 21 mph)
- Capacity: 2,000 passengers; 188 vehicles (originally 206 vehicles, 60 tall vehicles)

The Jumbo class are two ferries that were built by Washington State Ferries in 1972 to supersede the Super class. They have a capacity of 2,000 passengers and 188 vehicles.

Ferries in this class:

- MV Spokane
- MV Walla Walla

== History ==
By the late 1960s, Washington State Ferries was in need of new vessels to replace its aging fleet that required expensive upkeep. The extremely busy Seattle–Bainbridge Island ferry route was also outgrowing the Super-class ferries that had been delivered just five years earlier.

The solution was an even larger class of vessels. Instead of just expanding the Super class, the state picked a new design from Phillip Spaulding, that would have a long, low look. This new Jumbo-class vessel would be 440 ft (130 m) long, 87 ft (27 m) wide and could accommodate 206 vehicles, at the time, the largest double-ended ferries in the world.

Todd Shipyards in Seattle was awarded the contract to construct two vessels, with plans to order two more if the ferries worked out. While the agency was pleased with the vessels, the funding for the second set of two ships never materialized.

The Jumbo-class vessels would be assigned to the Seattle–Bainbridge route for more than two decades, before they were displaced by the even larger Jumbo Mark-II-class ferries. Since then, the Jumbo-class vessels have been primarily assigned to the Edmonds–Kingston and Seattle–Bremerton routes.
