= MV Chelan =

Auto/passenger ferry operated by Washington State

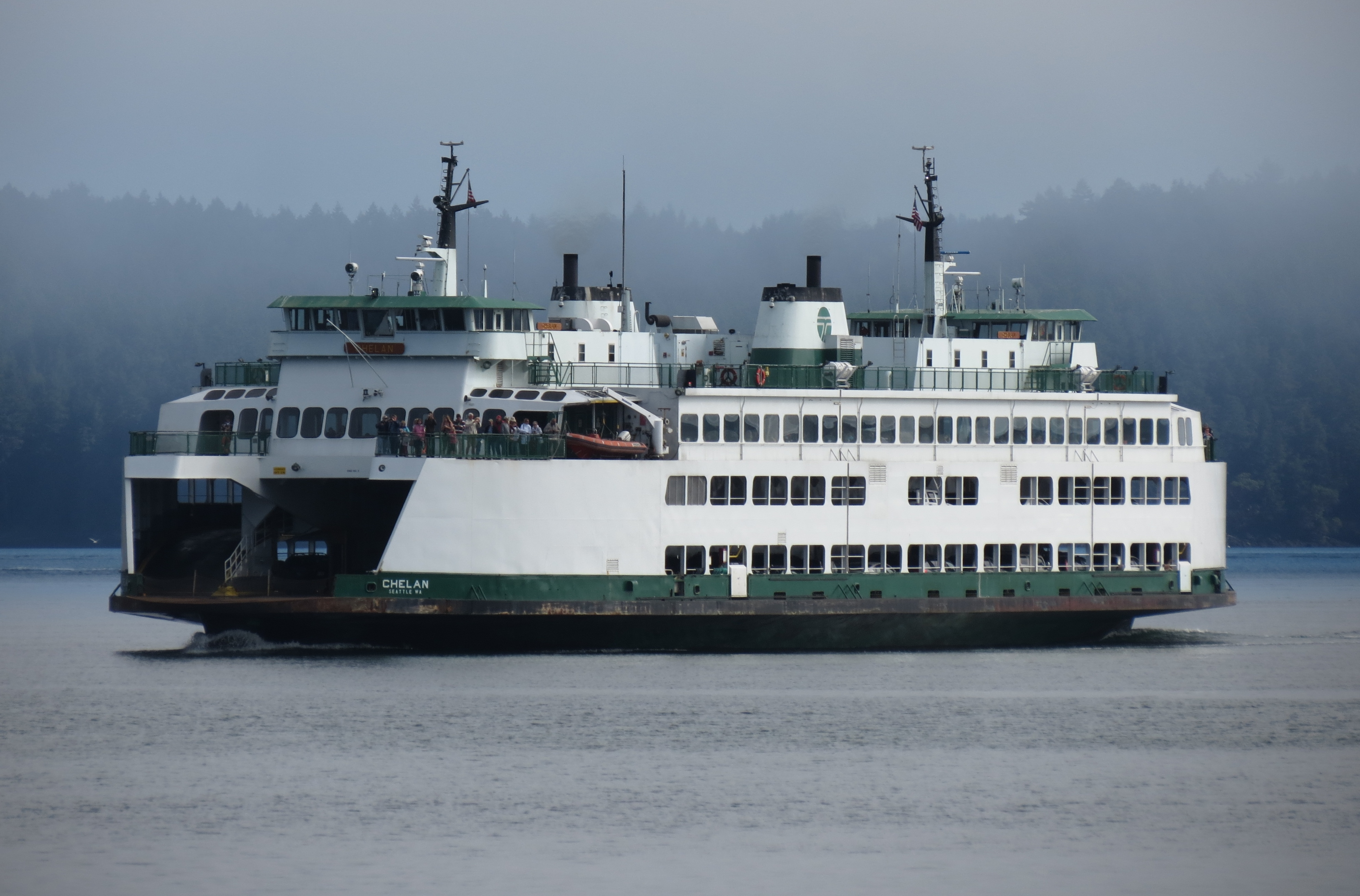
- Chelan at Friday Harbor, 2013

History
- Owner: Washington State Department of Transportation
- Operator: Washington State Ferries
- Port of registry: Seattle, Washington
- Route: Anacortes–San Juan Islands–Sidney, BC
- Builder: Marine Power and Equipment, Seattle, Washington
- Completed: 1981
- Identification: IMO number: 7808140; MMSI number: 366709770; Callsign: WCX7878; Official Number: 643291
- Status: In service

General characteristics
- Class & type: Issaquah-class auto/passenger ferry
- Tonnage: 2,477 gross tonnage (GT)
- Displacement: 3,310 long tons (3,360 t)
- Length: 328 ft (100 m)
- Beam: 78 ft 8 in (23.98 m)
- Draft: 15 ft 6 in (4.72 m)
- Decks: 4 (2 auto decks, passenger deck, nav bridge deck)
- Deck clearance: 15 ft 6 in (4.72 m)
- Propulsion: 5,000 hp (3,700 kW) total from two diesel engines
- Speed: 16 knots (30 km/h; 18 mph)
- Capacity: 1,200 passengers (1,090 on international service); 124 vehicles (24 tall vehicles)

The MV Chelan is an Issaquah-class ferry operated by Washington State Ferries, completed and in service in 1981. In 2004, the vessel was refit with a second vehicle deck, and in 2005 was refit with safety equipment to meet the requirements of the International Convention for the Safety of Life at Sea (SOLAS), allowing the Chelan to make international trips on the Anacortes–San Juan Islands–Sidney, British Columbia route. As of April 2020 the Chelan is the only vessel in the Washington State Ferries fleet that meets SOLAS standards. As of 2026, that SOLAS certificate has expired.

== History ==
The Chelan was built in 1981, as an Issaquah-class ferry, for service on the Edmonds–Kingston ferry route. In the early 1990s, ridership on the Edmonds–Kingston route had grown to the extent that the Chelan could not handle capacity, and she was replaced on this route by a second Super-class ferry.

The Chelan was kept in reserve to serve as a replacement ferry. On many of the routes she would serve, she would replace an Issaquah-class ferry that had been refit with a second vehicle deck, and the Chelan would cause service disruptions by carrying fewer vehicles.

In 2004, she was refit, much like her sister ships to include a second vehicle deck along the outer bulkheads.

After changes in United States Coast Guard rules for international travel, the Chelan was upgraded in 2005 safety equipment to meet the requirements of the International Convention for the Safety of Life at Sea (SOLAS). She is currently the only vessel in the WSF fleet to meet these standards, making it the only ship that can make the international crossing to Sidney, British Columbia. The safety equipment requirements of SOLAS limit the Chelan to 1,090 passengers when making international trips, as opposed to the 1,200 she can carry on domestic crossings. During the SOLAS refit, the interior of the Chelan was also updated to match the other Issaquah-class ferries, with one notable addition, the Chelan also has a small duty-free shop onboard.

Because of her SOLAS capability, the Chelan served the Anacortes–San Juan Islands–Sidney, BC route during spring, summer and fall; she now typically stays on the domestic service between Anacortes and the San Juan Islands during the winter.
