= MV Evergreen State =

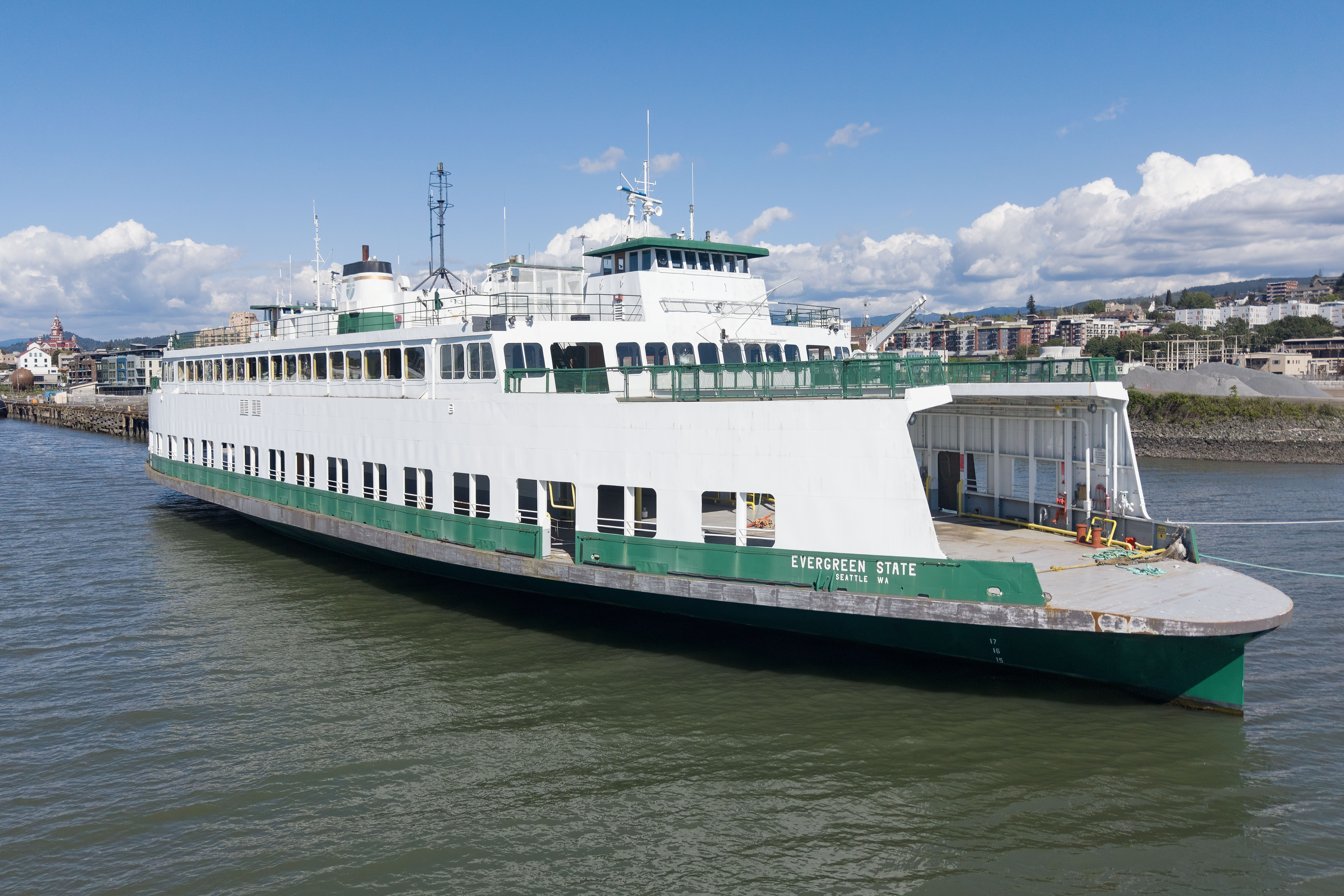
- MV Evergreen State moored in Bellingham, Washington after a failed sale

History
- Name: Evergreen State
- Owner: WSDOT
- Operator: Washington State Ferries
- Port of registry: Seattle, Washington, United States
- Route: Fauntleroy/Vashon/Southworth
- Completed: 1954; Refit: 1988
- In service: November 27, 1954
- Out of service: December 31, 2015
- Identification: IMO number: 8836132; MMSI number: 366773050; Callsign: WTQ6960; Official Number: D268732
- Status: Retired

General characteristics
- Class & type: Evergreen State-class auto/passenger ferry
- Length: 310 ft (94.5 m)
- Beam: 73 ft (22.3 m)
- Draft: 15 ft 10 in (4.8 m)
- Decks: 1 auto deck/1 passenger deck
- Deck clearance: 13 ft 7 in (4.1 m)
- Installed power: Total 2,500 hp (1,900 kW) from 2 × diesel-electric engines
- Speed: 13 knots (24 km/h; 15 mph)
- Capacity: 981 passengers; 87 vehicles (max 30 commercial)

The MV Evergreen State is a decommissioned Evergreen State-class ferry that was operated by Washington State Ferries from 1954 to 2015. She was built in Seattle and used surplus engines from USS Mitchell, a U.S. Navy destroyer escort that had been purchased by the Puget Sound Navigation Company.

She was named for the state of Washington, whose nickname is "The Evergreen State". When delivered in 1954, the Evergreen State was assigned to the Seattle-Winslow run serving Bainbridge Island. She was reassigned to the San Juan Islands in 1959 where she remained for the majority of her active career for Washington State Ferries. However, the ferry also was used as a relief vessel on the Seattle to Winslow runs in the 1960s.

From June 2000 until the retirement of the Steel Electric class in November 2007 this ferry was used as a relief vessel. The sudden retirement of the Steel Electrics forced the full-time reactivation of the Evergreen State. After reactivation, the Evergreen State was the inter-island service vessel in the San Juan Islands.

The Evergreen State left the San Juan Islands for good on June 29, 2014, replaced by her sister ship MV Klahowya, and made her last sailing from Friday Harbor at 2:15 PM and from Lopez Island at 3:05 PM. Following that sailing, she sailed to Eagle Harbor on Bainbridge Island. A month after 'retirement', a substantial fleet shortage resulted in the reactivation of the Evergreen State, and for some time thereafter the vessel was intermittently in service - usually on the Fauntleroy-Vashon-Southworth triangle route. Galley Service has not been provided on the Evergreen State since the mid 2000s.

On January 14, 2016, Washington State Ferries issued a press release stating that the ferry "has been decommissioned and will soon be put up for sale." The vessel was sold in March 2017 to Jones Broadcasting for $300,000, with the intent of using it in the Caribbean Sea.

The ferry was moored at the Port of Olympia in preparation for its move to Florida, but Jones failed to move the vessel for more than a year and fell behind on dockage payments. Evergreen State, renamed "The Dream", was listed on eBay in January 2020 with a starting bid of $100,000. The auction ended with 130 bids and a final price of $205,100 from an unnamed buyer, who planned to convert it into an art studio. The auction was nonbinding and the vessel was sold to another owner, Bart Lemetta, instead. Lemetta moved the ferry to Langley and began refurbishing it into an electric vessel in 2021. It has been moored in Bellingham since 2022.
