= Edmonds station (Washington) =

Amtrak and commuter train station in Edmonds, Washington

Edmonds, WA
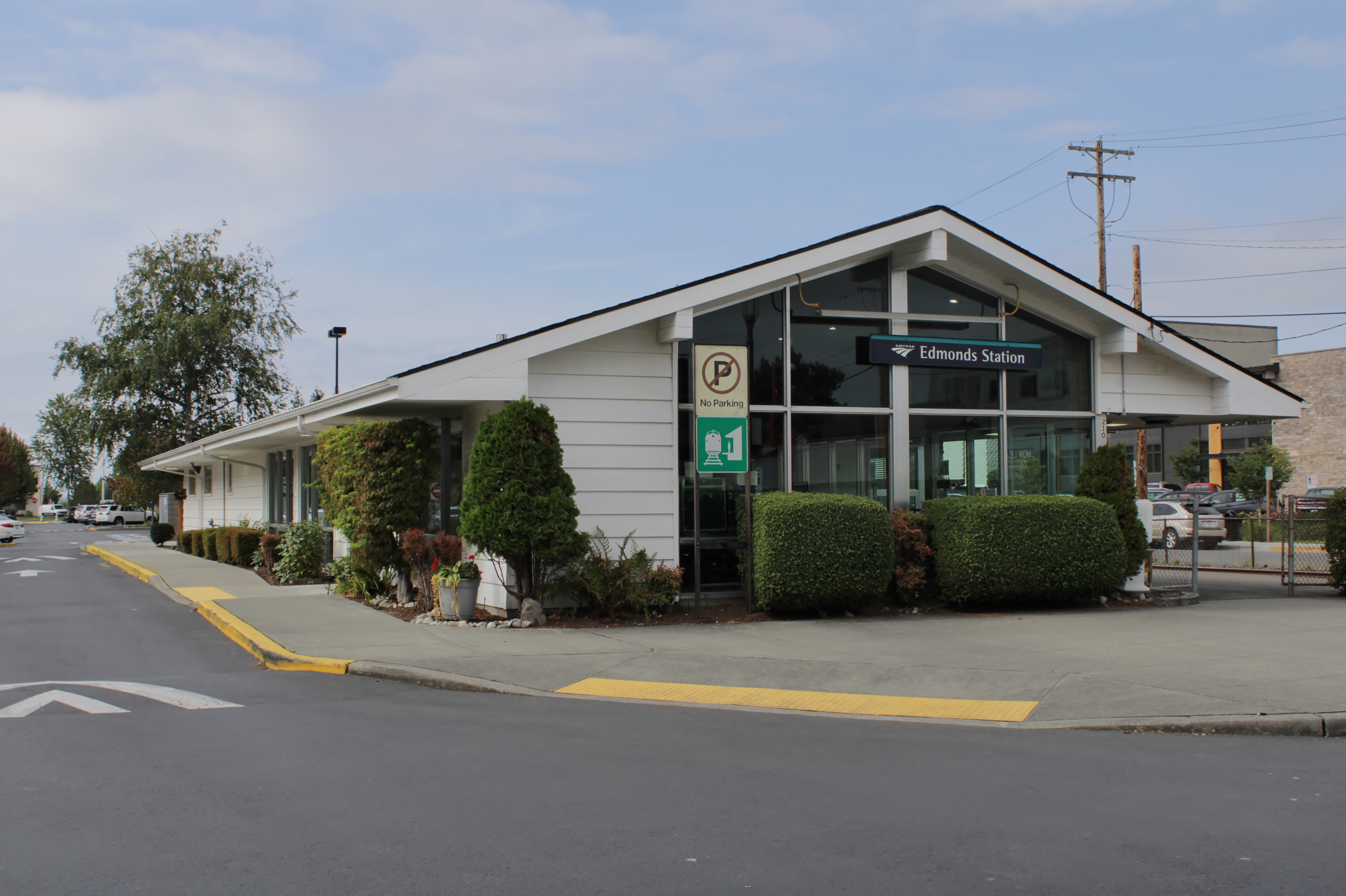
- The station building, viewed from the north

General information
- Location: 211 Railroad Avenue; Edmonds, Washington; United States
- Coordinates: 47°48′40″N 122°23′03″W
- Owner: BNSF Railway
- Line: BNSF Scenic Subdivision
- Platforms: 1 side platform
- Tracks: 1
- Connections: Amtrak Thruway; Community Transit; Northwestern Trailways; Washington State Ferries

Construction
- Parking: 259 spaces (Sound Transit)
- Cycle facilities: Racks and lockers
- Accessible: Yes

Other information
- Station code: Amtrak: EDM

History
- Opened: January 7, 1957
- Rebuilt: 2010–2011

Passengers
- 27,886 total boardings (Amtrak, FY 2025); 21,108 total boardings (Sounder, 2025)

Services
Preceding station	Amtrak	Following station
Seattle toward Eugene	Amtrak Cascades	Everett toward Vancouver, British Columbia
Seattle Terminus	Empire Builder	Everett toward Chicago
Preceding station	Sound Transit	Following station
Sounder
Seattle Terminus	N Line	Mukilteo toward Everett
Former services
Preceding station	Amtrak	Following station
Seattle Terminus	North Coast Hiawatha	Everett toward Chicago
Seattle Terminus	Expo '74	Everett toward Spokane
Preceding station	Great Northern Railway	Following station
Richmond Beach toward Seattle	Main Line	Meadowdale toward St. Paul
Richmond Beach toward Seattle	Vancouver, BC – Seattle	Meadowdale toward Vancouver, BC
Location

Edmonds station is a train station serving the city of Edmonds, Washington, in the United States. The station is served by Amtrak's Cascades and Empire Builder routes, as well as Sound Transit's N Line, a Sounder commuter rail service which runs between Everett and Seattle. It is located west of Downtown Edmonds adjacent to the city's ferry terminal, served by the Edmonds–Kingston ferry, and a Community Transit bus station. Edmonds station has a passenger waiting room and a single platform.

The station building was opened by the Great Northern Railway in 1957, replacing the city's older depot from 1910. Great Northern merged into Burlington Northern (later BNSF Railway) in 1970; passenger service ceased when Amtrak took over Burlington Northern's passenger routes the following year. Amtrak began operating passenger service from Edmonds station in July 1972 and it has been served by Cascades (originally the Mount Baker International) since 1995. Sound Transit began operating Sounder trains to Edmonds station in December 2003, and later funded a project to rebuild the station and transit center in 2011. The Sound Transit project was conceived after earlier plans to build a combined ferry–rail facility southwest of the city were cancelled in 2008.

== Description ==
Edmonds station is located on a single-tracked segment of the BNSF Scenic Subdivision on Railroad Avenue in downtown Edmonds, adjacent to the Edmonds ferry terminal. It has a single, 1,200-foot-long (370 m) side platform on the east side of the tracks, running from Dayton Street to Main Street and paved with asphalt; the southern half of the platform, measuring 520 feet (160 m), has ticket vending machines, bicycle lockers, and passenger waiting shelters. The Amtrak building is located south of James Street and includes a staffed ticket office, waiting room, vending machines, and restrooms. The building was designed with Modernist elements, including clean lines in the exterior brick walls laid in a stacked bond and large floor-to-ceiling windows. The south end of the station building includes a freight room with a garage and a former baggage room that was occupied by a model railroad exhibit. The model railroad, run by the Swamp Creek and Western Railroad Association, was at the station until 2022 and moved to Everett Station the following year.

At the north end of the station platform is a transit center used by Community Transit buses. It contains Standing Wave, a 12-foot (3.7 m) bronze-and-patina sculpture by Gerard Tsutakawa resembling a series of waves, installed as part of Sound Transit's art program. To the west of the transit center is the Washington State Ferries terminal, which is adjacent to Brackett's Landing Park and the city's downtown commercial district. Edmonds station has 259 parking spaces for Amtrak and Sound Transit passengers, including leased spaces from the nearby Salish Crossing shopping mall—home to the Cascadia Art Museum and several businesses.

== History ==
=== Early stations ===
Edmonds was founded in 1876 and received its first railroad in 1891, constructed by the Seattle and Montana Railroad between Seattle and British Columbia. The Great Northern Railway later acquired the railroad and completed its transcontinental route to Seattle in 1893, bringing long-distance passenger service to Edmonds. The original station was located on the west side of the tracks away from downtown and derided as inaccessible and undersized for the growing city. A formal investigation of stations across Snohomish County by the Washington State Railroad Commission in 1909 led to a court order for Great Northern to improve their depots, including a modernized facility for Edmonds at James Street, which the railroad resisted in their failed appeal to the state court. Great Northern later agreed to build the new depot after further consultation with Edmonds city leaders over its location and amenities. Later visits by the commission attracted crowds of up to a hundred citizens, and the city agreed to a right of way franchise with Great Northern for the new depot in January 1910. The railroad and city continued to argue over the proposed depot's distance from James Street until the chamber of commerce intervened and requested a compromise be reached.

The new Edmonds depot opened in November 1910, constructed with clapboard sidings and had a wooden platform that was connected to street level by a series of ramps, which were later decorated with railroad knick-knacks. It was initially served by eight daily passenger trains: limited transcontinental trains and local service to Seattle and Vancouver, British Columbia. Freight services from the new depot also accepted shipments from the Olympic Peninsula, delivered by boat from various shingle mills. By the late 1950s, Great Northern's declining passenger service left Edmonds with only one daily train: the Cascadian from Seattle to Spokane.

=== Modern depot and Amtrak ===
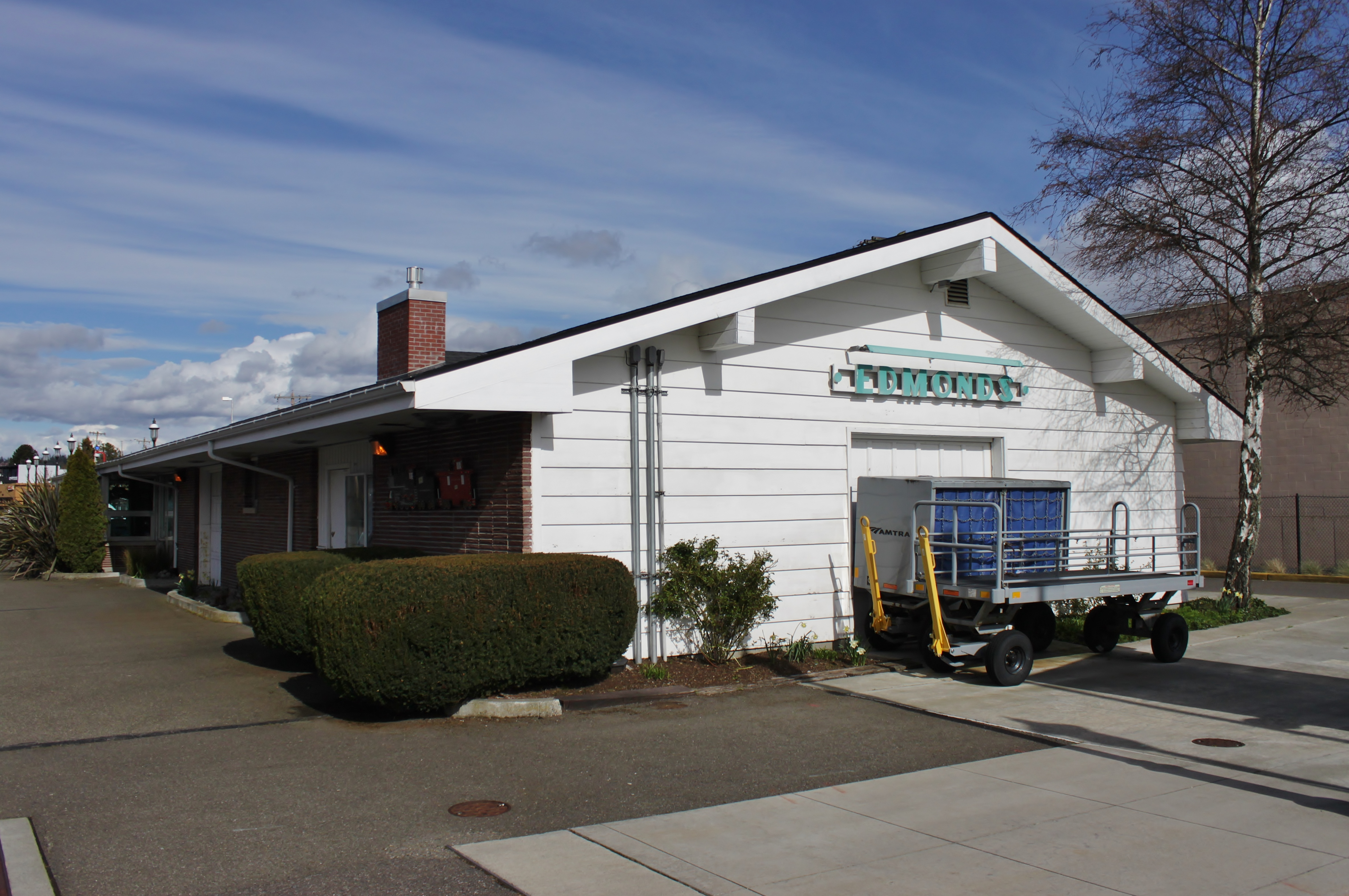
South side of the Edmonds station building, built to handle freight shipments

In March 1956, Great Northern announced plans to build a modern station in Edmonds to serve the suburban areas north of Seattle, at a cost of $185,000. The new station would include a 175-stall parking lot, a blacktop platform, and a streamlined waiting room with contemporary design elements. Construction of the new station building began in May 1956 and was substantially complete by the end of November. The former depot was demolished on December 18, 1956, and the near-complete station was put into service by the end of the month. It was dedicated on January 2, 1957, and the first transcontinental Empire Builder train to stop at Edmonds arrived on January 7, greeted by a crowd of 1,000 residents and civic leaders from across the region, including Secretary of State Earl Coe.

In March 1970, Great Northern was merged with three other major railroads into the Burlington Northern Railroad, which continued to operate passenger service for one year. In November, the federal government established Railpax (later Amtrak) to consolidate unprofitable transcontinental passenger services previously operated by competing railroads. The six passenger trains serving Edmonds were eliminated or rerouted elsewhere under the Railpax plan; the final Empire Builder train departed from Edmonds on the afternoon of April 30, 1971. The station remained open as a Burlington Northern freight stop and maintained by the railroad in hopes of restored passenger service. Passenger trains to Edmonds station returned a year later on July 17, 1972, with the restored Pacific International between Seattle and Vancouver, British Columbia. Transcontinental service to Edmonds returned on June 13, 1973, via an extension of the North Coast Hiawatha over Stevens Pass, and was supplemented by the rerouted Empire Builder in 1981. Amtrak cancelled the North Coast Hiawatha in 1979 and Pacific International in 1981 due to poor patronage and ticket sales, leaving Edmonds with only two daily train departures. Edmonds was slated to lose its ticketing office and baggage claim in 1983 as part of national cuts to stations with low ridership, but was spared by Amtrak because of an increase in ticket revenue.

The Seattle–Vancouver corridor was designated as a priority high-speed rail corridor by the United States Department of Transportation in 1992. Reinstatement of passenger rail service to Vancouver was supported by Congressman Al Swift, who lobbied for its inclusion in the national transportation budget, along with a contribution from Washington state. The reinstated service would require raised speed limits through Edmonds, which was opposed by residents and the city council in a dispute that began in the late 1980s. The raised speed limits were approved by an administrative law judge, against the city's wishes, and new fences were slated to be built along the railroad using city permits. The permits remained unapproved in early May 1995, only weeks before service was scheduled to begin, and Amtrak threatened to skip Edmonds station until they were issued. An agreement was signed by Amtrak and Edmonds, allowing for trains on the Mount Baker International to use the station beginning May 25, 1995. The train was later folded into the Amtrak Cascades brand introduced in January 1999.

=== Commuter rail ===
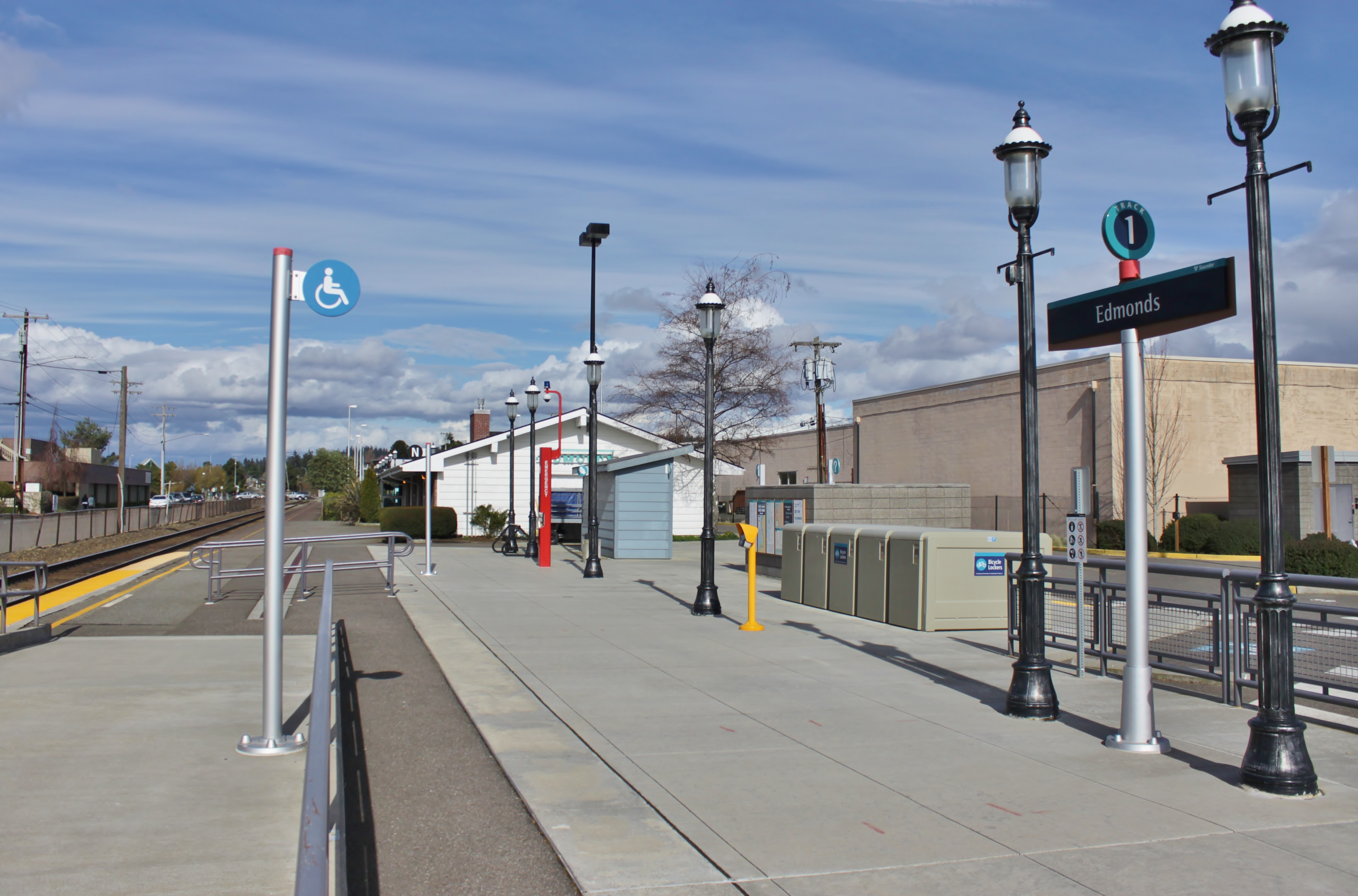
The platform at Edmonds station, rebuilt in 2011

In conjunction with the Amtrak Cascades program, the city's government proposed the development of a multimodal center for Amtrak, commuter rail, buses, and ferries to replace separate facilities in downtown Edmonds. The multimodal project, named "Edmonds Crossing", was evaluated in the 1990s and a preferred location on part of a disused Unocal fuel terminal at Point Edwards, to the southwest of downtown, was chosen in 1998. The multimodal hub would include a rail station with 570 parking spaces shared with ferry users, as well as a bus terminal.

The Edmonds Crossing plan included provisions for an interim commuter rail station in downtown Edmonds, to be built by the new regional transit authority (later renamed Sound Transit). The transit authority ran a pilot commuter rail service to Seattle in early 1995, stopping at Everett and Edmonds, to promote a $6.7 billion transit plan that would be placed on a regional ballot measure in March. The ballot measure was rejected by voters, but a $3.9 billion plan was approved in the November 1996 election, including a commuter rail line from Everett to Seattle and $6 million in funding for an Edmonds station on the line. The Amtrak station was selected by Sound Transit as the site of the interim station in 2000 and the city government approved a fifteen-year plan for the interim station in 2002. The commuter rail line was originally scheduled to begin service in 2001, but was delayed due to negotiations with the Federal Transit Administration and BNSF Railway, the successor to Burlington Northern. The interim station in Edmonds included an extended platform and new parking lot on the south side of the Amtrak facility, both located on property acquired from BNSF. Sounder commuter rail service from Everett and Edmonds began on December 21, 2003.

The final environmental impact statement for the Edmonds Crossing project was published in 2004 and received a Record of Decision the following year, but lacked a funding source. Jurisdiction of the $171 million project was transferred to Washington State Ferries in 2007, but the ferry system instead prioritized repair and replacement of vessels over capital projects, and announced in 2009 that the Edmonds Crossing project would be left unfunded for a 20-year period. Funding for the permanent Edmonds station had been approved in the Sound Transit 2 passed by voters in 2008 and was scheduled to begin construction in the summer of 2009. In response to the cancellation of the Edmonds Crossing project, the Edmonds City Council requested the expedited design and construction of a permanent Sounder station.

Construction of the permanent Sounder station began in July 2010, following agreements signed by Sound Transit and the city government, and a formal groundbreaking was held in August. The $12.9 million project included the construction of a new platform, four passenger waiting shelters, a new transit center, improved lighting, and repaving of the parking lots. The new platform was opened on July 9, 2011, and was followed by the opening of the transit center in October. As part of the project, the number of parking spaces for commuter rail users was reduced from 200 to 161. An additional 53 parking spaces were opened for Sounder passengers in November 2012, leased from the private Waterfront Antique Mall while another lot with 103 spaces was built and leased to Sound Transit. Future plans call for double tracking of the railroad through Edmonds and a second platform at Edmonds station, located to the west along Railroad Avenue.

== Services ==
Edmonds station is served by six daily Amtrak trains: four Cascades runs between Seattle and Vancouver, British Columbia (with two continuing south to Portland, Oregon), and two transcontinental Empire Builder runs between Seattle and Chicago. The station is also served by the N Line of Sound Transit's Sounder commuter rail service on weekdays, running four trains in peak direction towards King Street Station in Seattle during the morning commute and four trains from Seattle during the evening commute. Sounder trains also run on select weekends during special events.

The station also serves as the terminus of four Community Transit routes, including all-day local routes to nearby areas in Lynnwood, Mountlake Terrace, and Shoreline. An express route connects Edmonds station to Mountlake Terrace station on the 1 Line of Sound Transit's Link light rail system. The Edmonds–Kingston ferry connects Edmonds to the Kitsap Peninsula and takes approximately 30 minutes to complete a crossing of Puget Sound. Daily intercity bus service at Edmonds station is provided by the Dungeness Line, a Travel Washington bus route connecting the Olympic and Kitsap peninsulas to Seattle and Seattle–Tacoma International Airport.
