= San Anselmo station =

California railway depot (1874-1941)

San Anselmo

General information
- Location: San Anselmo, California; United States
- Coordinates: 37.9759°N 122.5617°W
- Elevation: 52 feet (16 m)
- Platforms: 2
- Tracks: 2
- Train operators: North Pacific Coast Railroad; Northwestern Pacific Railroad

Construction
- Structure type: At-grade
- Architectural style: Mission

History
- Opened: 1874
- Closed: 1941
- Electrified: 1903
- Former names: Junction

Services
Preceding station	Northwestern Pacific Railroad	Following station
Fairfax toward Cazadero	North Shore Railroad	Kentfield toward Sausalito
Yolanda toward Manor	Sausalito–Manor	Bolinas toward Sausalito
Highland toward San Rafael	Sausalito–San Rafael via San Anselmo	Bolinas toward Sausalito
Location

The San Anselmo station was a railway station and depot located in San Anselmo, California. Railway service through San Anselmo began in 1874, and lasted until 1941.

== History ==
The station, originally known as "Junction", opened in 1874 when the Northwestern Pacific Railroad laid track through San Anselmo. The station was located on the south end of the junction where the narrow-gauge line between Cazadero and Sausalito branched off towards San Rafael. In its early years, the station, which also had a freight platform, served as an important transfer point, as well as a place for water and fuel refills.

The original depot was located further north, and was little more than an outpost. In 1883, the station was renamed to "San Anselmo". A second, wooden depot was built around 1900. In 1903, the line from Sausalito to San Anselmo was completely retracked and electrified. It was double-track in its entirety, with the sole exception being the Alto tunnel, which was single-track. Standard-gauge electric interurban service began operation in 1903, which necessitated an extra rail to allow narrow-gauge trains to continue using the line. Then, during the 1910s, a new mission-style depot with a passenger waiting room was built.

San Anselmo retained its prominence during the interurban era, being the point where northbound interurban trains would decouple to go to Manor or San Rafael, or conversely, where southbound trains would join again for the trip to Sausalito. During the commute rush, trains would run every half-hour through San Anselmo.

The station closed with the system shutdown of the Northwestern Pacific Interurban Network on March 1, 1941. The tracks were ripped up shortly thereafter. The San Anselmo depot continued to be used as a bus station until it was ultimately razed in 1963.
