= GGT =

GGT may refer to:

== Biology and medicine ==
- Gamma-glutamyltransferase, an enzyme that catalyzes the reaction between a peptide and an amino acid
- Glutathione hydrolase, an enzyme that hydrolyzes glutathione
- A codon for the amino acid Glycine
- Germline gene therapy, to treat genetic diseases

== Language ==
- Gitua language, spoken on New Guinea

== Transport ==
- Exuma International Airport, The Bahamas (IATA:GGT)
- Golden Gate Transit, a public transport system in California, U.S.

== See also ==
- Galactolipid galactosyltransferase (GGGT), an enzyme in glycerolipid metabolism
