= Marin Civic Center station =

Railway station in San Rafael, California, U.S.

Marin Civic Center
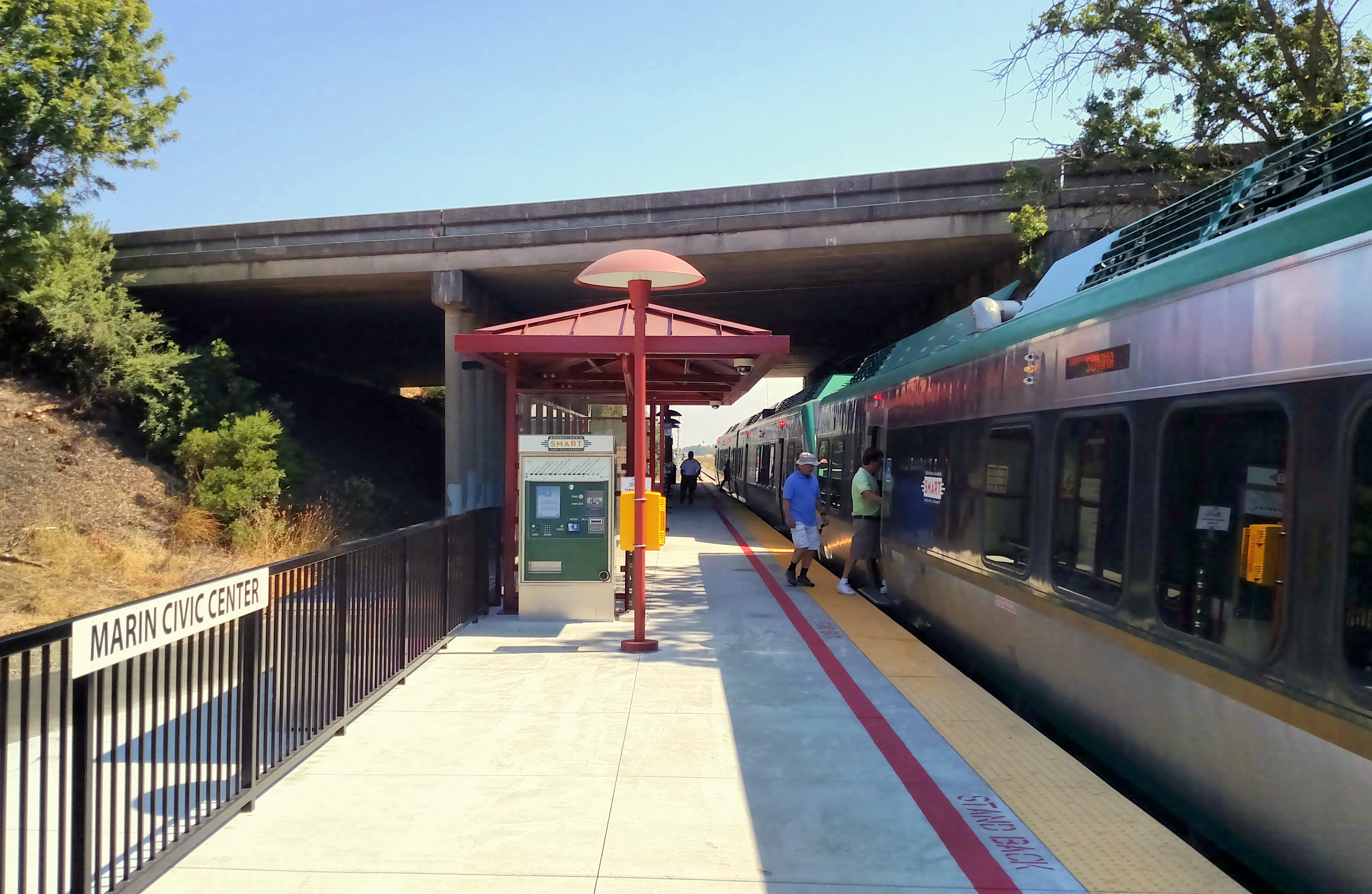
- A northbound train at Marin Civic Center station in 2018

General information
- Location: 3801 Civic Center Drive; San Rafael, California
- Coordinates: 38°00′06″N 122°32′15″W
- Line: SMART Mainline Subdivision
- Platforms: 1 side platform
- Tracks: 1
- Connections: Marin Transit: 35, 49

Construction
- Parking: Yes
- Cycle facilities: 8 spaces

Other information
- Station code: SMART: MCC
- Fare zone: 1

History
- Opened: June 29, 2017 (preview service); August 25, 2017 (full service)

Services
| Preceding station | SMART | Following station |
|---|---|---|
| Novato Hamilton toward Windsor | SMART | San Rafael toward Larkspur |
Location

Marin Civic Center station is a Sonoma–Marin Area Rail Transit station in San Rafael, California, located adjacent to the Marin County Civic Center.

== History ==
BART proposed a train station near the current location as part of the Marin Line in a report sent to the approving counties in 1961. Marin's exit from the Bay Area Rapid Transit District halted these plans.

The current station opened to preview service on June 29, 2017; full commuter service commenced on August 25, 2017.
