= DGDG synthase =

DGDG synthase may refer to:

- Digalactosyldiacylglycerol synthase, an enzyme
- Galactolipid galactosyltransferase, an enzyme
