= Gamma-glutamyltranspeptidase =

Gamma-glutamyltranspeptidase may refer to:

- Gamma-glutamyl transpeptidase, an enzyme
- Glutathione hydrolase, an enzyme
