= Mill Valley station =

Train station in Mill Valley, California

Mill Valley
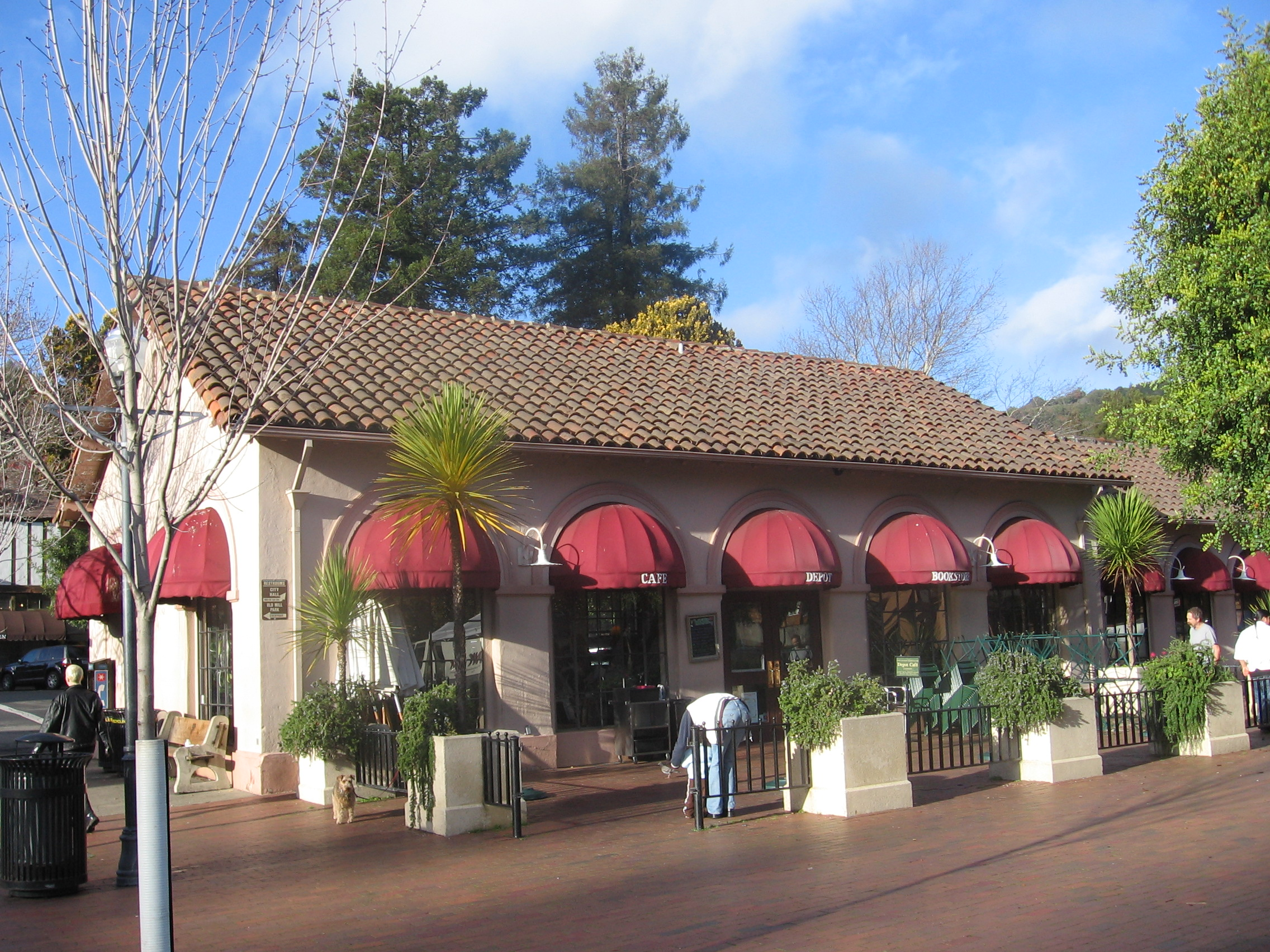
- The depot in 2007

General information
- Location: 87 Throckmorton Avenue; Mill Valley, California; United States
- Coordinates: 37.9062°N 122.5480°W
- Elevation: 66 feet (20 m)
- Platforms: 2 side platforms, 1 island platform (standard-gauge), 1 side platform, 1 island platform (narrow-gauge)
- Tracks: 2 standard-gauge, multiple-narrow gauge
- Train operators: Mount Tamalpais and Muir Woods Railway; North Pacific Coast Railroad; Northwestern Pacific Railroad

Construction
- Structure type: At-grade
- Architectural style: Mission Revival

History
- Opened: 1889
- Closed: 1940
- Rebuilt: 1900; 1929
- Electrified: 1903
- Previous names: Eastland

Services
Preceding station	Northwestern Pacific Railroad	Following station
Terminus	Sausalito–Mill Valley	Park Avenue toward Sausalito
Preceding station	Mount Tamalpais and Muir Woods Railway	Following station
Mesa toward Mt. Tamalpais	Mill Valley–Mt. Tamalpais	Terminus
Mountain Home Inn toward Muir Inn	Mill Valley–Muir Woods	Terminus

The Mill Valley station is a former railway station and historic depot located on Throckmorton Avenue in Mill Valley, California. Passenger railway services ran in Mill Valley between 1889 and 1940. The current station building was built in 1929 and served as a freight depot into the 1950s.

== History ==
The first train station in Mill Valley, named the Eastland station, opened in 1889. It was the terminal of a spur of the North Pacific Coast Railroad. Before the station's construction, the nearest train station to Mill Valley was the Almonte station near the current location of Tamalpais High School. The town and station soon changed their name to Mill Valley. The Mount Tamalpais and Muir Woods Railway was constructed from here to the top of Mount Tamalpais in 1896.

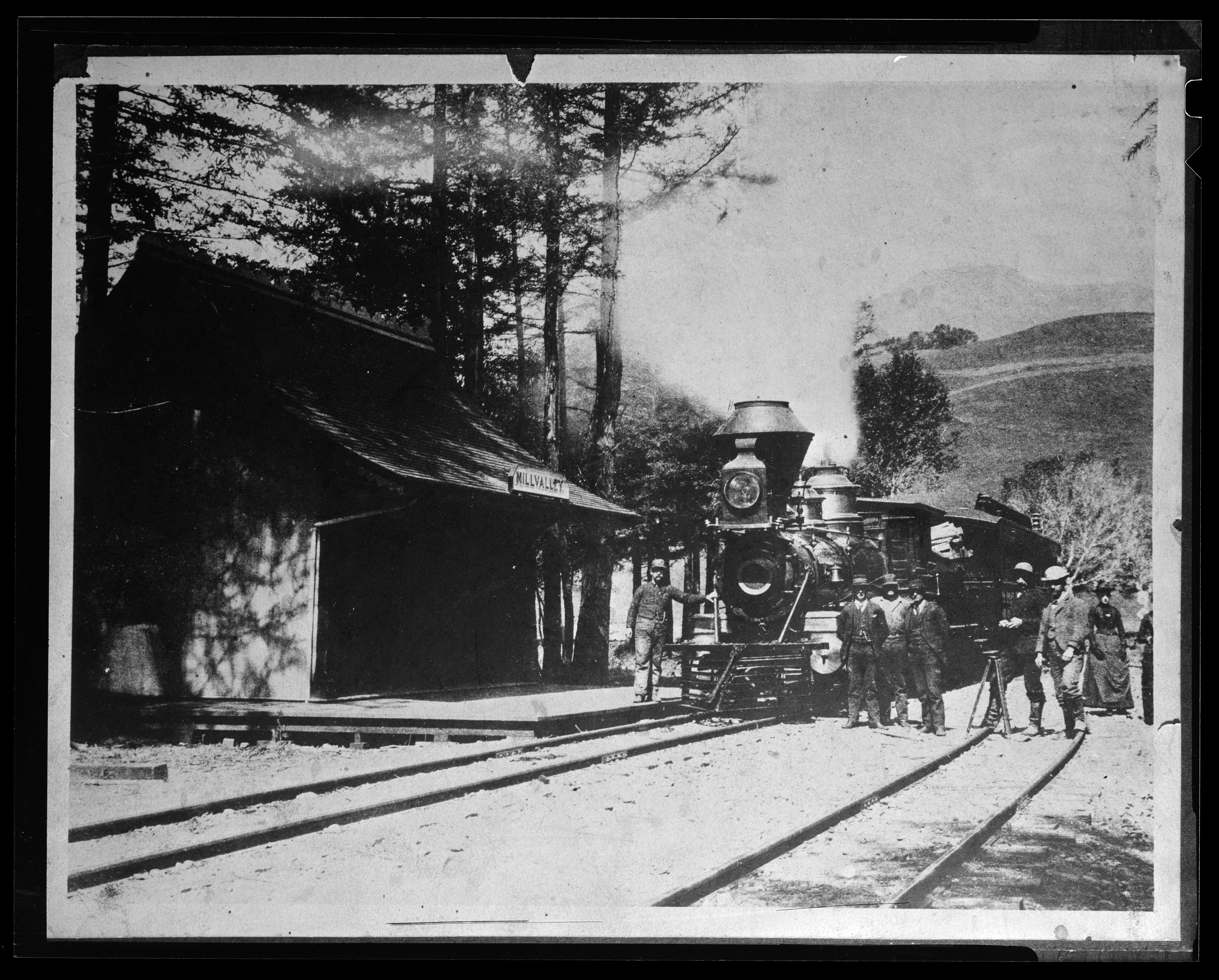
A photographic negative of the first Mill Valley Station with North Pacific Coast Railroad narrow gauge train stopped in front.

A new station was constructed in 1900. The line to Mill Valley was electrified in 1903, and the depot opened to interurban service on August 21, 1903.

In 1929, the current Mission Revival-style depot was built, replacing the previous wooden one. The depot stopped running westbound trains following the closure of the Mount Tamalpais and Muir Woods Railway in 1930 and ceased eastbound passenger service with the last train leaving for Sausalito on September 30, 1940, shortly before the complete shutdown of the Northwestern Pacific interurban system. Freight service continued until the early 1950s. The depot also served as a Greyhound stop until the 1970s.

== Present ==
The tracks and platforms have since been paved over and are now the depot plaza, and the depot was repurposed into a café and bookstore. Like many other former depots in Marin, it still has the Northwestern Pacific Railroad wooden medallion on the side.
