= Sausalito Ferry Terminal =

Ferry terminal in Sausalito, California, US

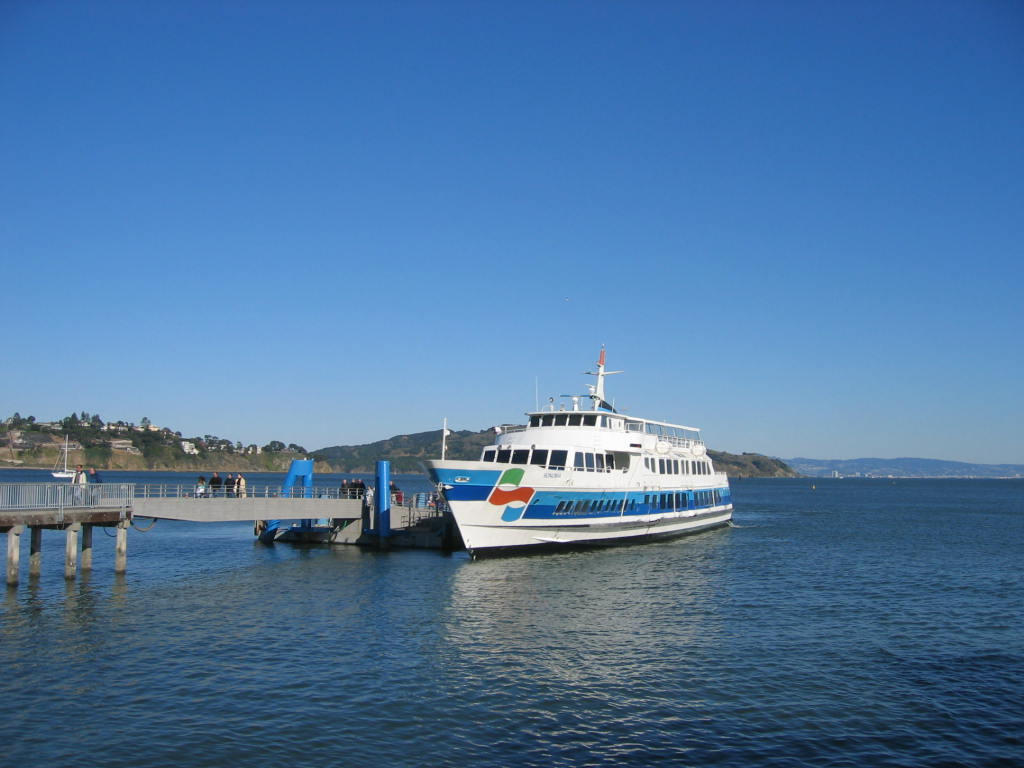
- Golden Gate Ferry docked at Sausalito, 2006

General information
- Location: Humboldt Avenue at Anchor Street; Sausalito, California
- Coordinates: 37.856°N 122.479°W
- Owner: City of Sausalito
- Operator: Golden Gate Bridge, Highway and Transportation District (as Golden Gate Ferry)
- Connections: Golden Gate Transit: 130; Marin Transit: 17, 61

Construction
- Parking: Yes

History
- Opened: 1868; August 15, 1970 (Golden Gate Ferry)
- Closed: February 28, 1941 (NWP)
- Rebuilt: 1996
Former railway services
Preceding station	Northwestern Pacific Railroad	Following station
Green Brae toward Eureka	Main Line	Terminus
Corte Madera toward Cazadero	North Shore Railroad	Terminus
Pine toward Mill Valley	Sausalito–Mill Valley	Terminus
Almonte toward Manor	Sausalito–Manor	Terminus
Pine toward San Rafael	Sausalito–San Rafael via San Anselmo	Terminus
Almonte toward San Rafael	Sausalito–San Rafael via Green Brae	Terminus
Terminus	Connection to San Francisco via Ferry	San Francisco Ferry Building Terminus
Location

Sausalito Ferry Terminal is a ferry terminal in Sausalito, California, connecting Marin County and San Francisco. The station is served by Golden Gate Ferry and Blue & Gold Fleet ferries as well as Golden Gate Transit and Marin Transit bus routes.

== History ==
Steam trains at Sausalito Terminal, photo dated May 1891

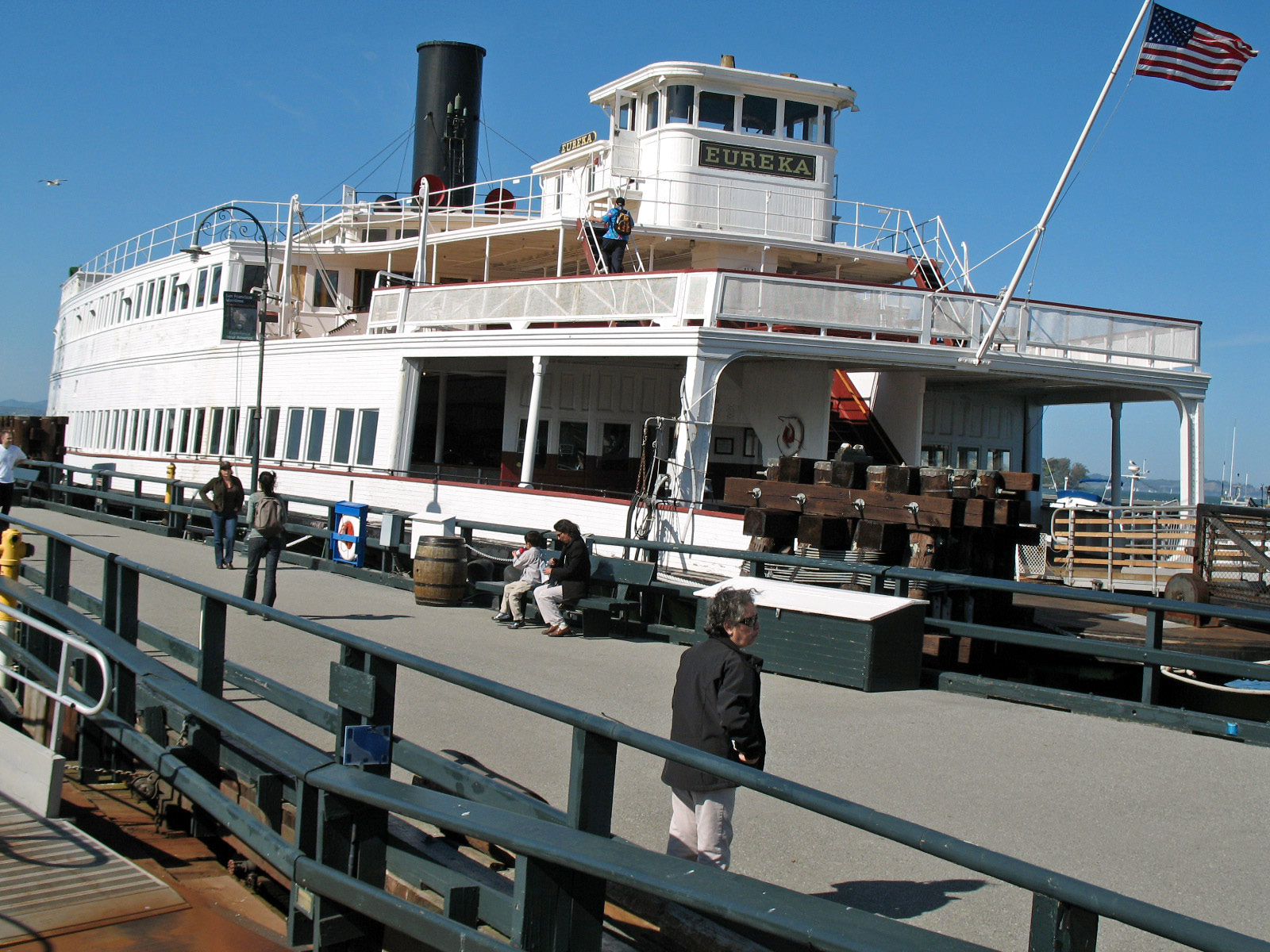
The Eureka, then the largest double-ended ferryboat in the world, carried passenger and automobile traffic on the Sausalito–San Francisco run from 1922 to 1941. (Pictured in San Francisco in 2008)

The Sausalito Land and Ferry Company began running ferries between here and San Francisco around 1868. The terminal served as the southern terminus and ferry connection to San Francisco for the North Pacific Coast Railroad, which purchased the service in 1875. Pedestrian ferries were discontinued on February 28, 1941, with car ferry service ended by March, a few years after opening of the Golden Gate Bridge.

On August 15, 1970, Golden Gate Ferries began service to San Francisco along with the inauguration of bus services to the ferry terminal that day. A new dock was built in 1996.
