= Novato Hamilton station =

Rail station in Novato, California, US

Novato Hamilton
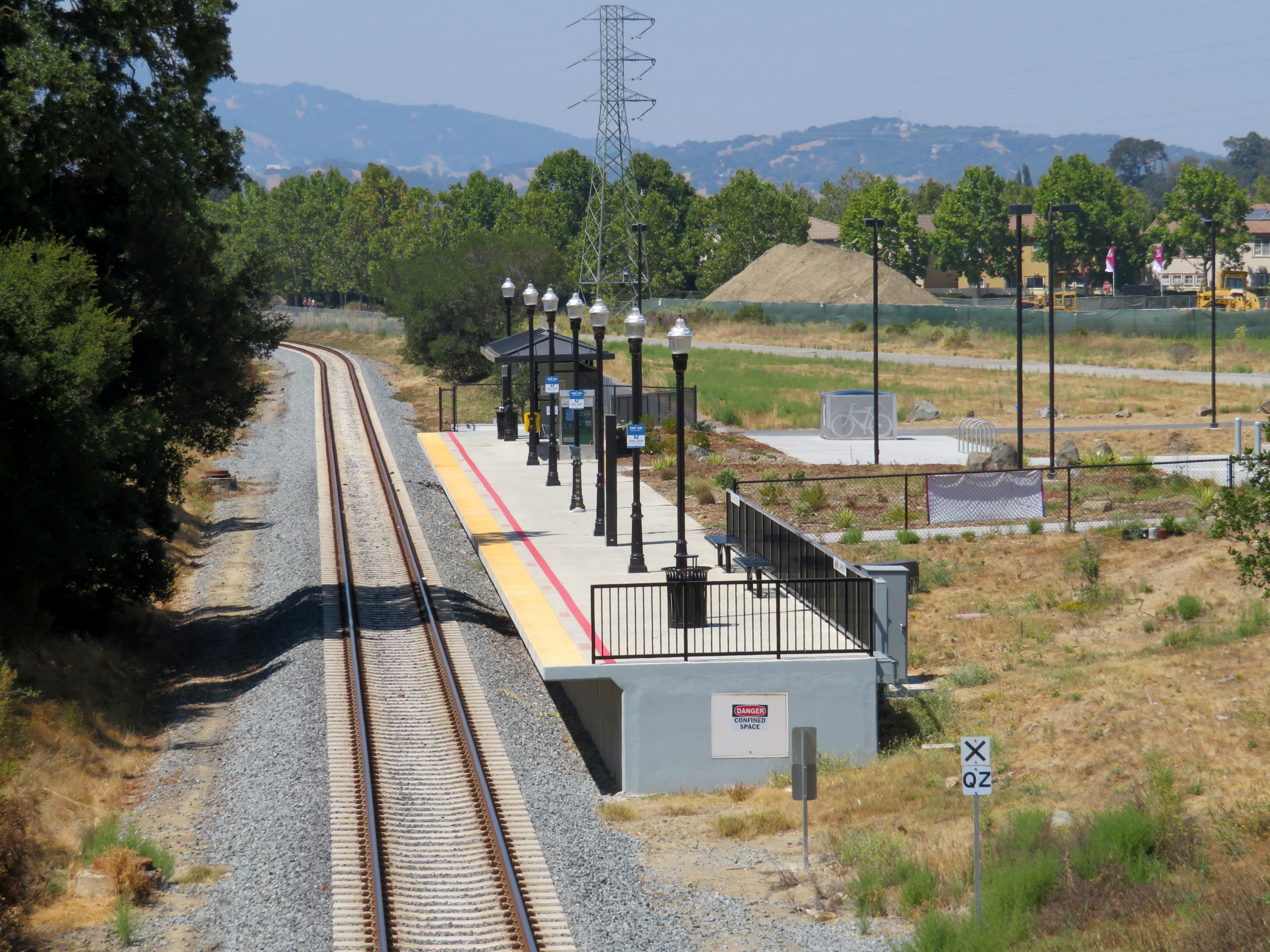
- Novato Hamilton station in 2018

General information
- Location: 10 Main Gate Road; Novato, California; United States
- Coordinates: 38°03′23″N 122°31′26″W
- Elevation: 37.9 ft (11.6 m)
- Line: SMART Mainline Subdivision
- Platforms: 1 side platform
- Tracks: 1

Construction
- Parking: 115 spaces
- Cycle facilities: 4 spaces
- Accessible: Yes

Other information
- Station code: SMART: HAM
- Fare zone: 2

History
- Opened: June 29, 2017 (preview service); August 25, 2017 (full service)

Services
Preceding station	SMART	Following station
Novato Downtown toward Windsor	SMART	Marin Civic Center toward Larkspur
Location

Novato Hamilton station is a Sonoma–Marin Area Rail Transit station in Novato, California. It opened to preview service on June 29, 2017; full commuter service commenced on August 25, 2017. It is located on the south side of the city near Hamilton Parkway and Hamilton Field (Hamilton AFB), from which the station takes its name. This was one of two stations planned for Novato in the Initial Operating Segment of SMART service; a third in Downtown Novato opened in December 2019. The station was built just north of the location of the 1910 Ignacio rail accident and southeast of the location of the former Northwestern Pacific Ignacio station.
