= Northwestern Pacific Railroad interurban lines =

Railway lines in Marin County, California, 1903-1941

Northwestern Pacific Railroad interurban
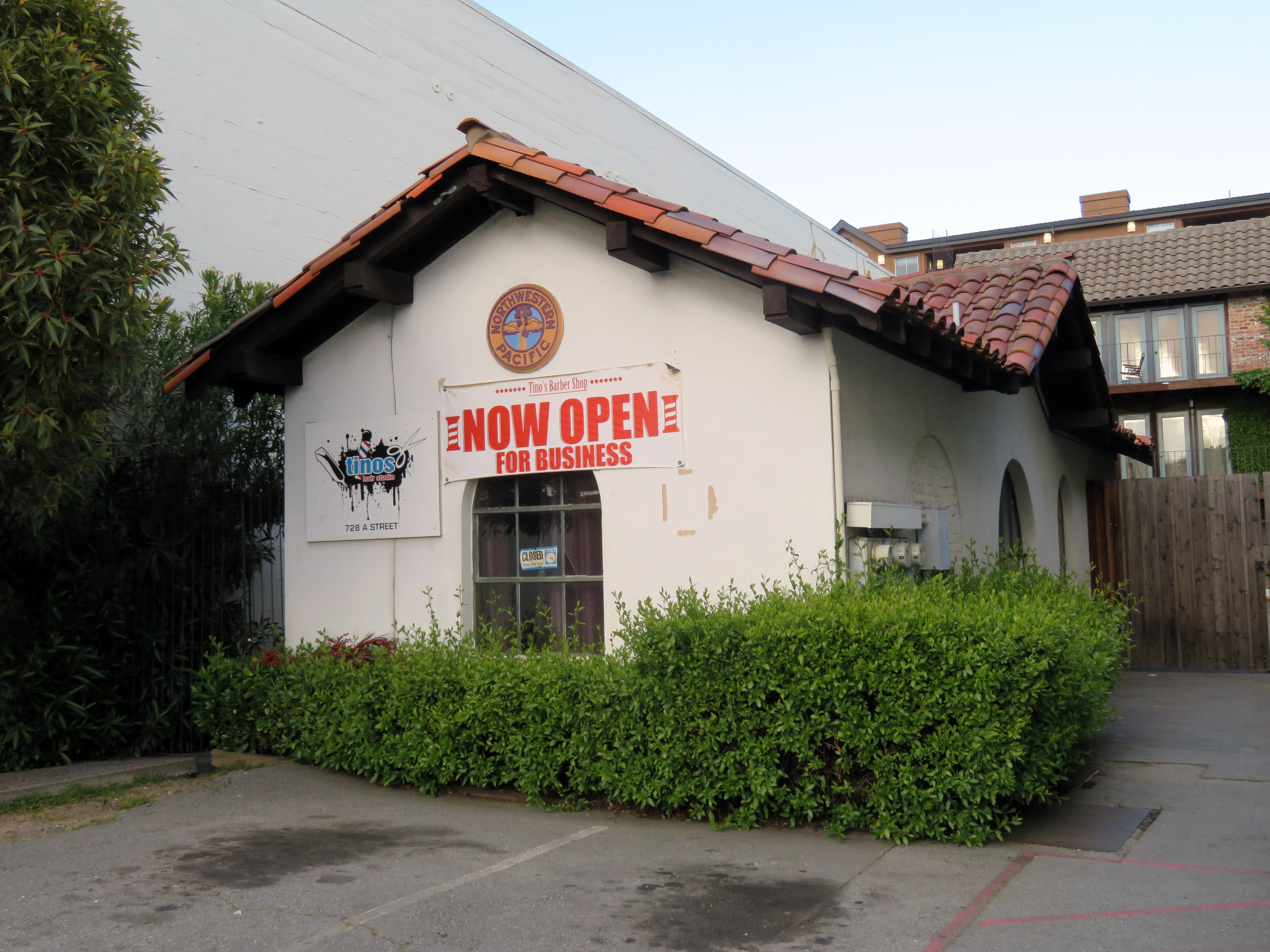
- The former B Street station in 2018

Overview
- Locale: Marin County

Service
- Type: Interurban
- System: Northwestern Pacific Railroad
- Services: 4

History
- Opened: August 21, 1903
- Closed: February 28, 1941

Technical
- Character: street running and private right of way with a ferry connection
- Track gauge: 1,435 mm (4 ft 8 1/2 in) standard gauge
- Electrification: 550 V DC third rail
- Signalling: automatic block

The Northwestern Pacific Railroad (and its predecessor North Shore Railroad) operated a network of electric interurban lines in Marin County, California from 1903 to 1941. The lines ran to Sausalito at the southern tip of the county, where connecting ferries ran to San Francisco. Trains consisted of electric multiple units powered by third rail electrification. The lines were the first third-rail electrification in California, and the first major railroad to use alternating current signals.

== History ==
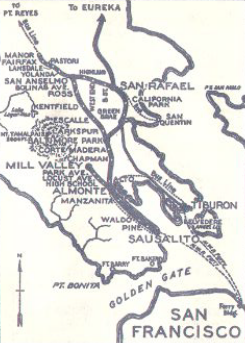
Map of the lines from a 1939 timetable

The North Pacific Coast Railroad was a narrow-gauge railroad constructed in the 1870s, primarily to haul redwood lumber from the Russian River valley. In 1902, a group headed by John Martin bought the railroad and renamed it as the North Shore Railroad. They raised $6 million to modernize and electrify the railroad ($218 million in 2024). The Sausalito–San Anselmo section of the main line was electrified, as were branches from Almonte to Mill Valley and San Anselmo to San Rafael. (Electrification was planned for the San Rafael–San Quentin line, but never carried out.) Revenue service began between Sausalito and Mill Valley on August 21, 1903, and to San Rafael on October 17. This was the first third-rail electrification in California.

The railroad was sold in April 1904 to magnate E. H. Harriman of the Southern Pacific Railroad (SP), who had acquired the rival California Northwestern Railway (CNW) the previous year. The common control allowed expansion: a cutoff was built east from Baltimore Park in Corte Madera to the CNW line, which was then electrified from there to San Rafael. (This also allowed the North Shore to use the CNW station in San Rafael.) The new route opened in 1904. In 1907, the two railroads and several others were united as the Northwestern Pacific Railroad (NWP), a holding company jointly owned by the SP and the Santa Fe Railway. Under NWP control, the ex-North Shore main line was electrified from San Anselmo to Manor in 1908.

The Santa Fe sold its half ownership of the NWP to the SP in 1929. The SP abandoned several unprofitable parts of the NWP, but invested in the interurban lines. The original suburban stations were replaced with Mission-style depots. New steel cars were acquired, which allowed many of the original wooden cars to be retired.

However, even this investment could not maintain profitability. A 1929 brush fire that destroyed much of Mill Valley, and the abandonment of the connecting Mount Tamalpais and Muir Woods Railway that same year, greatly reduced traffic on the Mill Valley line. In 1934, suffering the effects of the Great Depression, the railroad raised fares. The 1937 opening of the Golden Gate Bridge, which made automobile commuting from Marin County to San Francisco possible without using ferries, deeply hurt the interurban operations. Service ended on February 28, 1941.

The only remaining passenger service on the NWP was a small number of trains between Tiburon and points north. All of the formerly electrified territory was abandoned by the NWP, with the final San Rafael–Sausalito section given up in 1972. (That section was, at the time, proposed to be reused as a busway for Golden Gate Transit.) Much of the line between Waldo and Escalle was converted to the Mill Valley–Sausalito Path in the 1970s. Former interurban stations at Mill Valley, Larkspur, B Street, and San Rafael remain extant, as does the Baltimore Park substation. Sonoma–Marin Area Rail Transit (SMART) diesel-powered commuter rail service began north of San Rafael in 2017; it was extended south to Larkspur station in 2019, reactivating a section of the former interurban alignment.

== Operations ==
Four main routes were operated: Sausalito–Mill Valley, Sausalito–Manor, Sausalito–San Rafael via San Anselmo, and Sausalito–San Rafael via Green Brae. Manor and San Rafael trains ran combined between Sausalito and San Anselmo, where they were decoupled and ran to their separate destinations. Southbound trains were similarly combined at San Anselmo.

Previous electric railways had used direct current signals, which suffered interference from the direct current propulsion systems. The North Shore instead used a newly-invented alternating current signal system, which proved very effective. The signal system in the new subway in New York City was based on the technology used on the North Shore.
