= Larkspur station =

Railway station in California, US

Larkspur
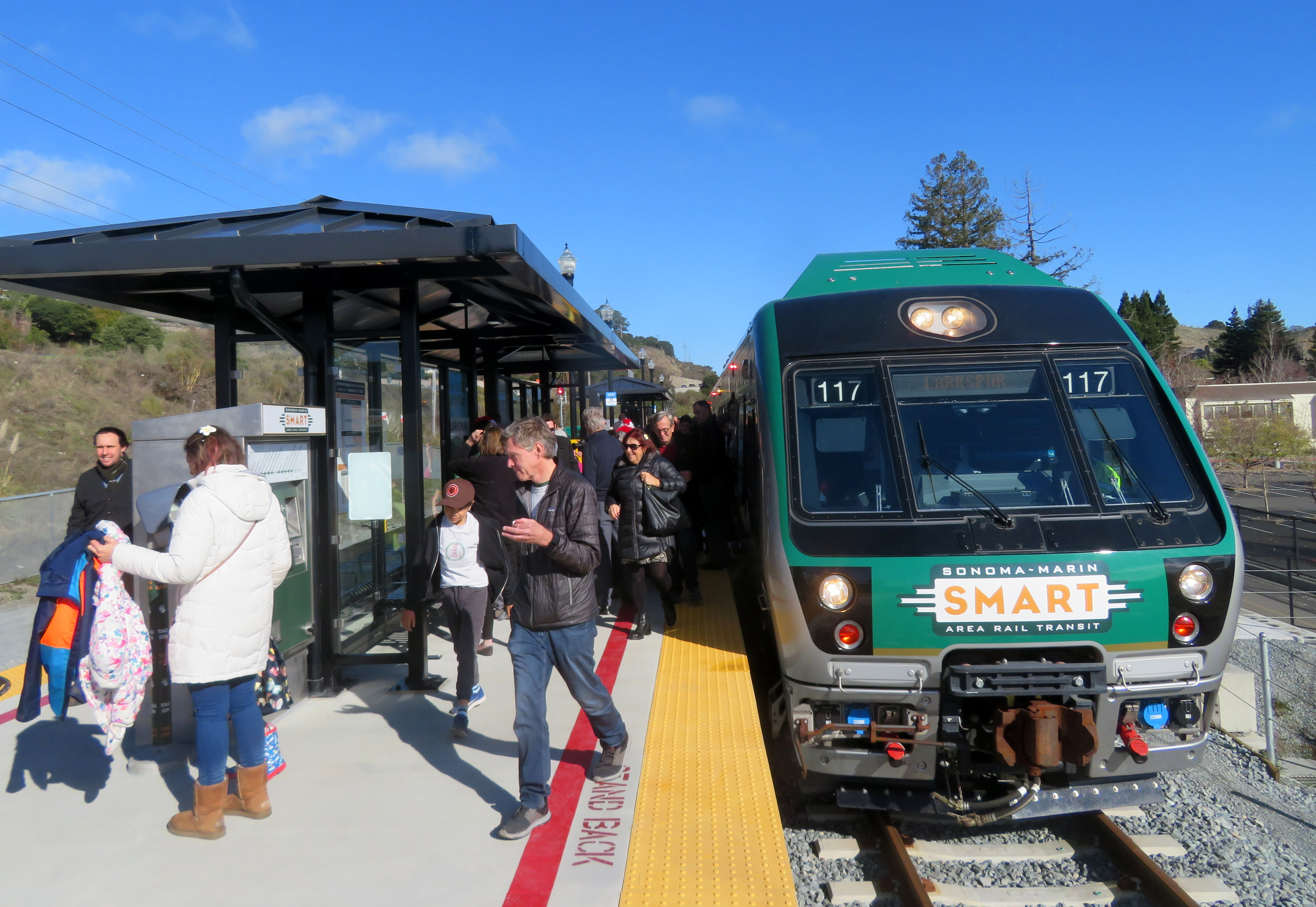
- The first revenue train at Larkspur station in December 2019

General information
- Location: 600 Larkspur Landing Circle; Larkspur, California; United States
- Coordinates: 37°56′52″N 122°30′45″W
- Elevation: 39.9 ft (12.2 m)
- Line: SMART Mainline Subdivision
- Platforms: 1 island platform
- Tracks: 2
- Connections: Golden Gate Ferry (at Larkspur Landing); Golden Gate Transit: 132; Marin Transit: 17, 29, 228; SMART Connect

Construction
- Parking: Yes
- Accessible: Yes

Other information
- Station code: SMART: LAR

History
- Opened: December 14, 2019

Services
Preceding station	SMART	Following station
San Rafael toward Windsor	SMART	Terminus
Former services at Green Brae
Preceding station	Northwestern Pacific Railroad	Following station
San Rafael toward Eureka	Main Line	Sausalito Terminus
California Park toward San Rafael	Sausalito–San Rafael via Green Brae	Detour toward Sausalito
Location

Larkspur station is a Sonoma–Marin Area Rail Transit (SMART) station in Larkspur, California. The terminal station opened to revenue service on December 14, 2019. It is located 1/3 mile (0.5 km) from the Larkspur Landing ferry terminal, across Sir Francis Drake Boulevard.

== History ==
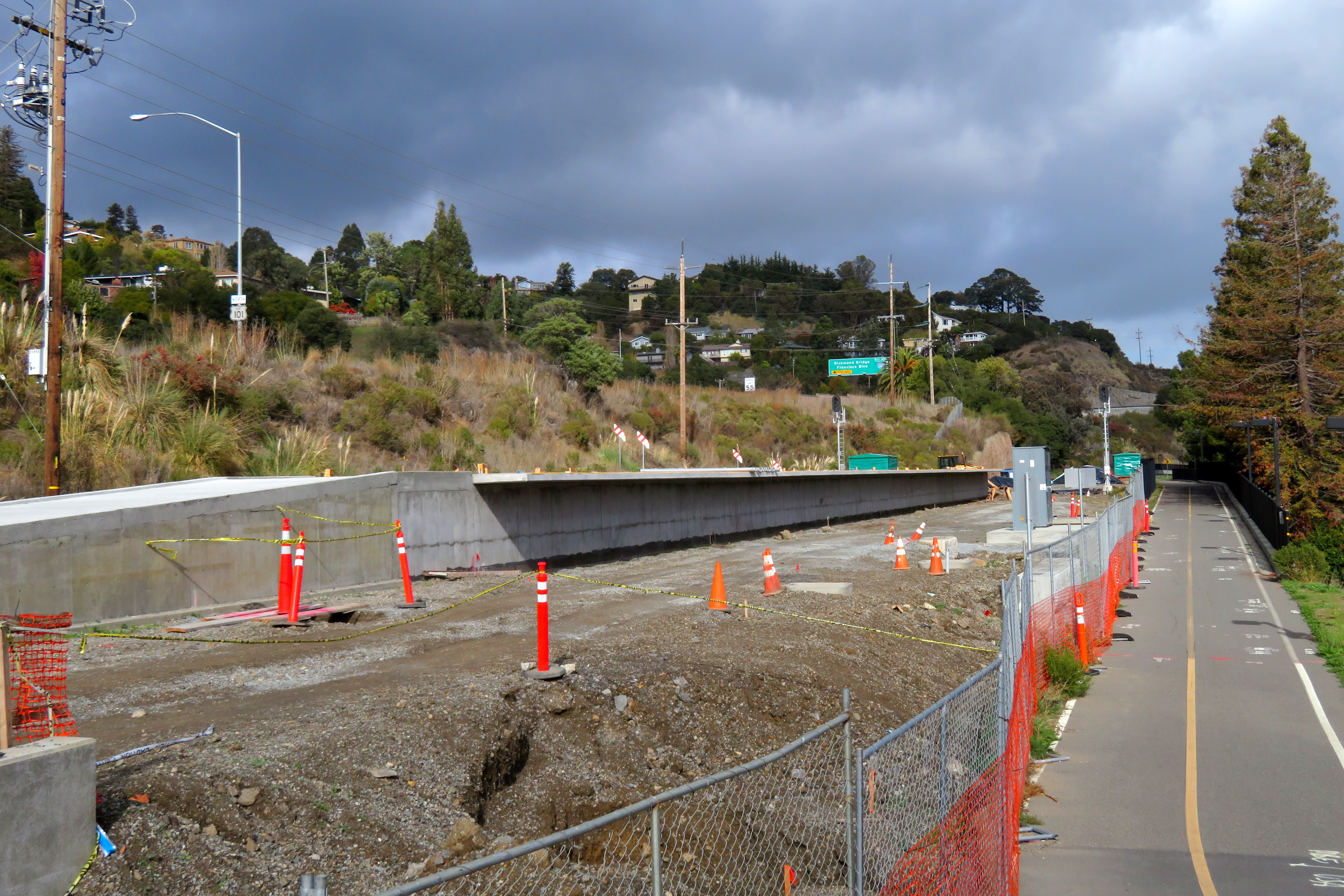
Larkspur station under construction in November 2018

The rail corridor was established by the North Pacific Coast Railroad, and a nearby stop called Greenbrae was served by Northwestern Pacific Railroad interurban cars between 1903 and 1941.

The land for the station was acquired in 1983 by the Golden Gate Bridge, Highway and Transportation District. Initially part of the original plan for SMART's full buildout, its opening was delayed to a later date as the line's construction was split into phases. Until the line was extended, shuttle bus service connected the Larkspur Terminal with San Rafael Transit Center.

Test trains on the extension began running on August 23, 2019. A preview excursion served as the station's inauguration on December 13, 2019, and revenue service began the following day.
