= San Rafael Transit Center =

Intermodal transportation center in California, US

San Rafael
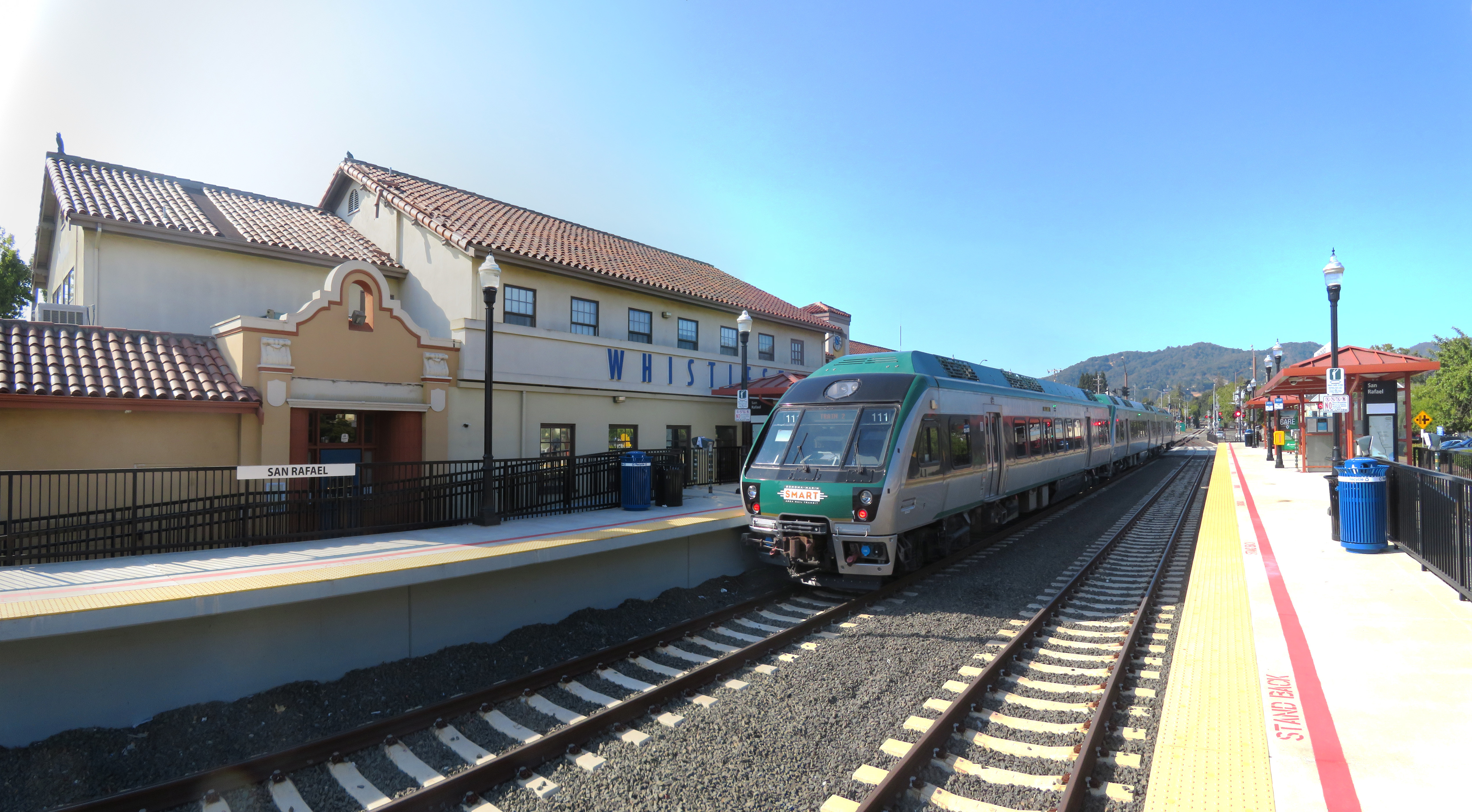
- San Rafael station with a northbound train in August 2018

General information
- Location: 3rd Street and Hetherton Street; San Rafael, California
- Coordinates: 37°58′15″N 122°31′21″W
- Line: SMART Mainline Subdivision
- Platforms: 2 side platforms
- Tracks: 2
- Connections: Golden Gate Transit; Marin Transit; Groome Transportation; Greyhound Lines

Construction
- Cycle facilities: Yes
- Accessible: Yes

Other information
- Station code: SMART: DSR
- Fare zone: 1 (SMART) 4 (GGT)

History
- Opened: 1991 (bus service); July 8, 2017 (SMART preview); August 25, 2017 (SMART service)

Passengers
- approx. 4,500 bus boardings daily (2018)

Services
Preceding station	SMART	Following station
Marin Civic Center toward Windsor	SMART	Larkspur Terminus
Former services
Preceding station	Northwestern Pacific Railroad	Following station
Hamilton Field toward Eureka	Main Line	Green Brae toward Sausalito
Terminus	Sausalito–San Rafael via San Anselmo	B Street toward Sausalito
Terminus	Sausalito–San Rafael via Green Brae	California Park toward Sausalito
Location

The San Rafael Transportation Center (also called C. Paul Bettini Transportation Center) is an intermodal transportation center located in downtown San Rafael, California. It is the primary transfer point for Marin Transit and regional bus operators, and a commuter rail station on the Sonoma–Marin Area Rail Transit (SMART) system.

== History ==
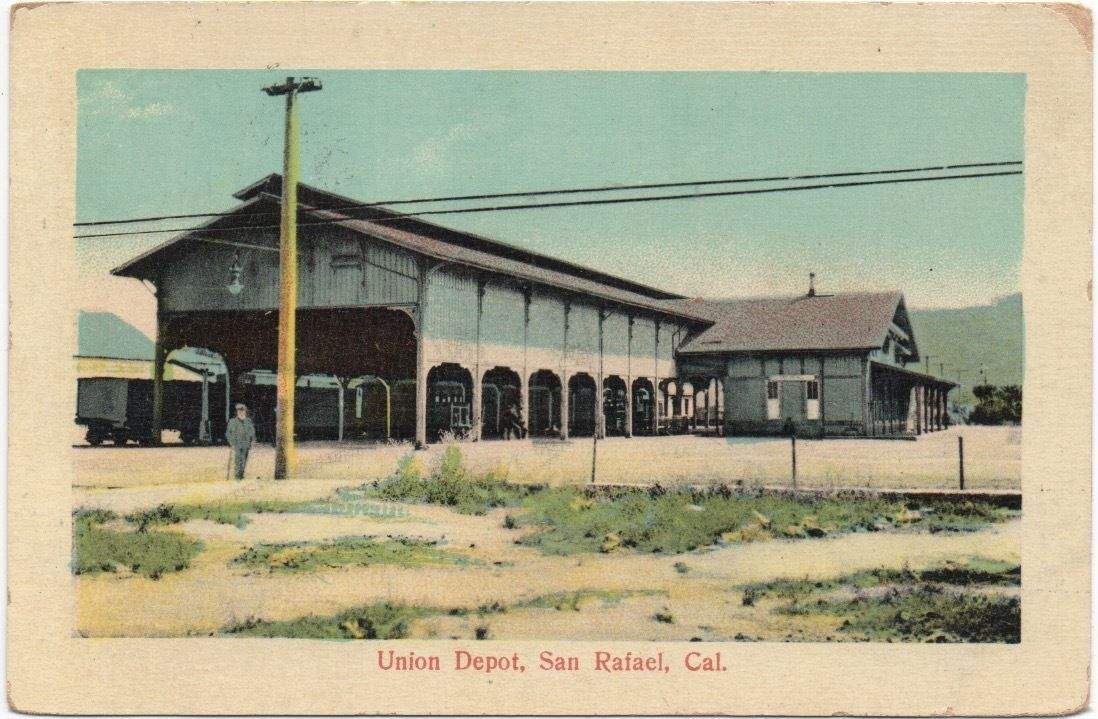
A 1911 postcard of the original San Rafael station

The original San Rafael railway depot that served the Northwestern Pacific Railroad was located at what is now a cafe north of the station. As rail use fell into decline, passenger service ended after November 10, 1958.

Buses came to prominence with the expansion of the road and highway system. The current transportation center was constructed around the station building in 1991.

SMART testing began in March 2016. Service began with preview rides on July 8, 2017, and full service commenced on August 25, 2017. The station acted as the southern terminal of the line until December 14, 2019, when the extension to Larkspur station opened. The bus terminal was reconfigured to allow the SMART tracks to pass through.

Marin Airporter service to the San Rafael Transit Center ended on October 6, 2019, due to traffic congestion around the transit center.

== Services ==
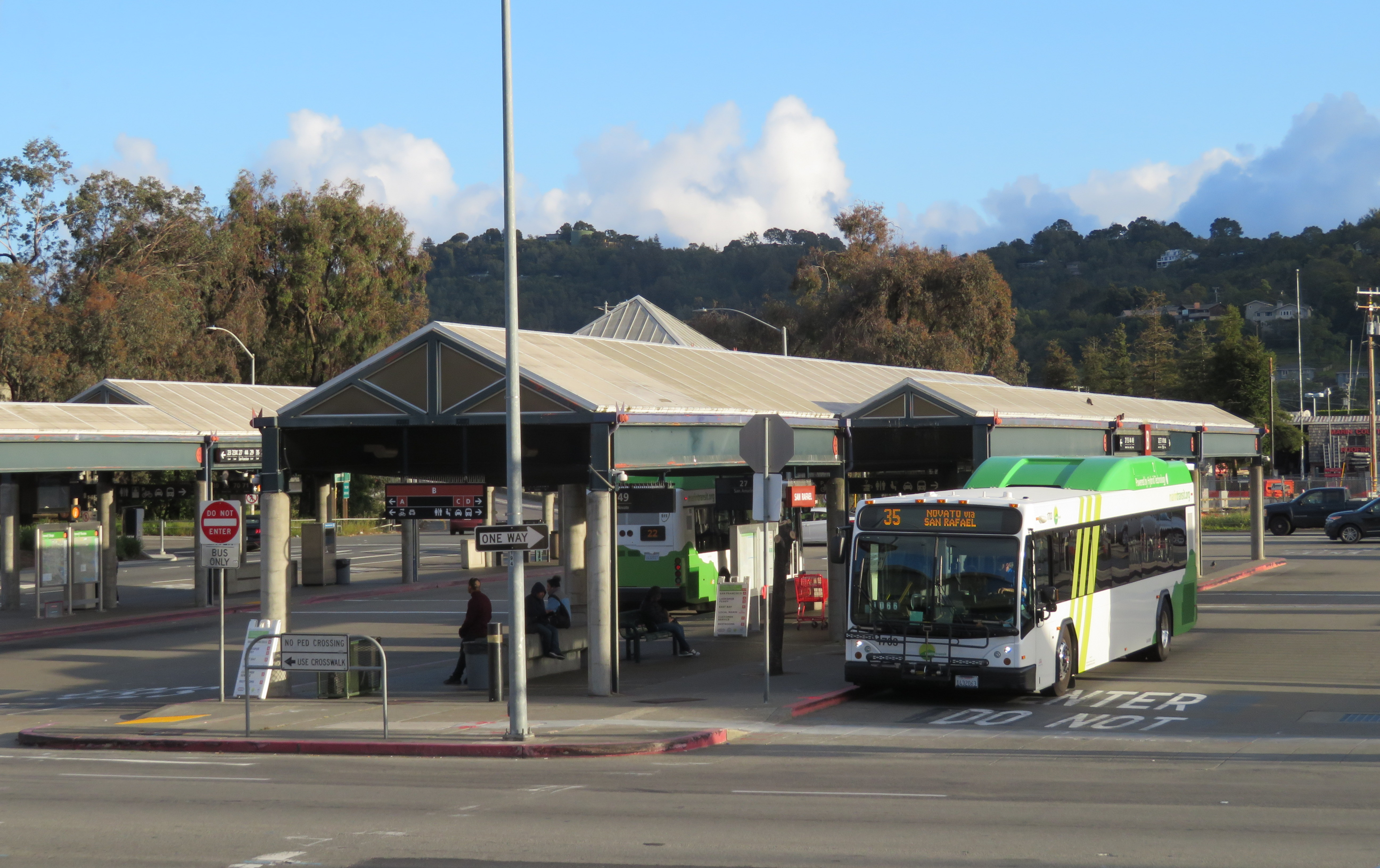
A Marin Transit bus at San Rafael Transit Center in 2018

San Rafael Transit Center has two side platforms serving the two tracks of the SMART mainline. The bus area, located south of the SMART platforms, has two side platforms and two island platforms.

San Rafael is the primary transfer point for Marin Transit, which operates local service plus two interurban routes. It is also served by several regional and intercity bus operators:

- Marin Transit: 17, 22, 23, 23X, 29, 35, 36, 49, 68, 71X, 122, 125, 145, 228, 233, 245, 257
- Golden Gate Transit: 101, 130, 132, 150, 580
- Groome Transportation
- Greyhound Lines
