= Mount Tamalpais and Muir Woods Railway =

Scenic tourist railway in California, U.S. (1896-1930)

In this postcard image, one of the railroad's Shay locomotives works its way up Mount Tamalpais. Note the railroad's practice of pushing trains upgrade, with the engine reversed at the rear of the train.

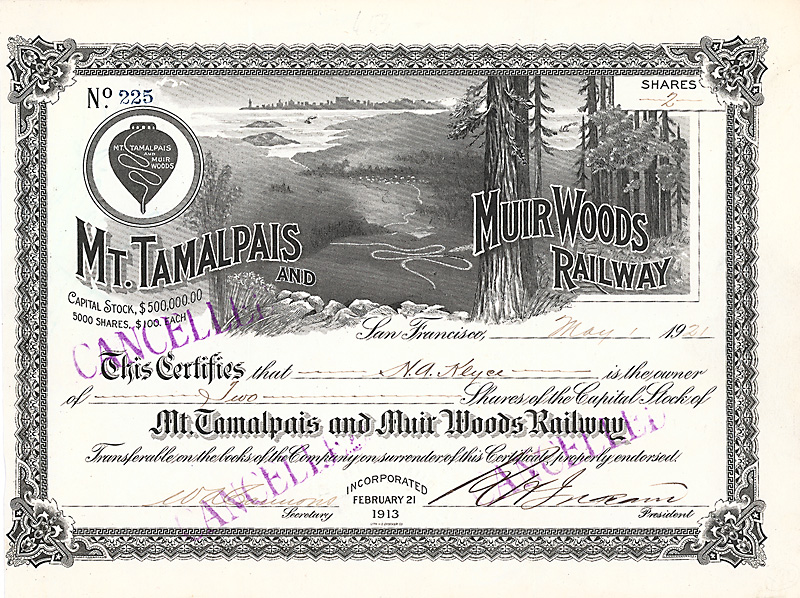
Share of the Mt. Tamalpais and Muir Woods Railway dated May 1, 1921

The Mount Tamalpais and Muir Woods Railway was a scenic tourist railway operating between Mill Valley and the east peak of Mount Tamalpais in Marin County, California, covering a distance of 8.19 miles (13.18 km), with a 2.88-mile (4.63 km) spur line to the Muir Woods. The railroad was incorporated in January 1896, and closed in the summer of 1930. Originally planned as a 4 ft 8 1/2 in (1,435 mm) standard gauge electric trolley line, the railroad was powered by a succession of geared steam locomotives. Billed as the "Crookedest Railroad in the World", the line was renowned for its steep and serpentine route, winding through picturesque terrain to a mountaintop tavern providing first-class hospitality and panoramic views of the San Francisco Bay Area. Despite its popularity, the railway met its demise following a fire in 1929, and dwindling ridership when the automobile could finally drive to Tamalpais' summit.

== Origin ==
=== Mount Tamalpais ===
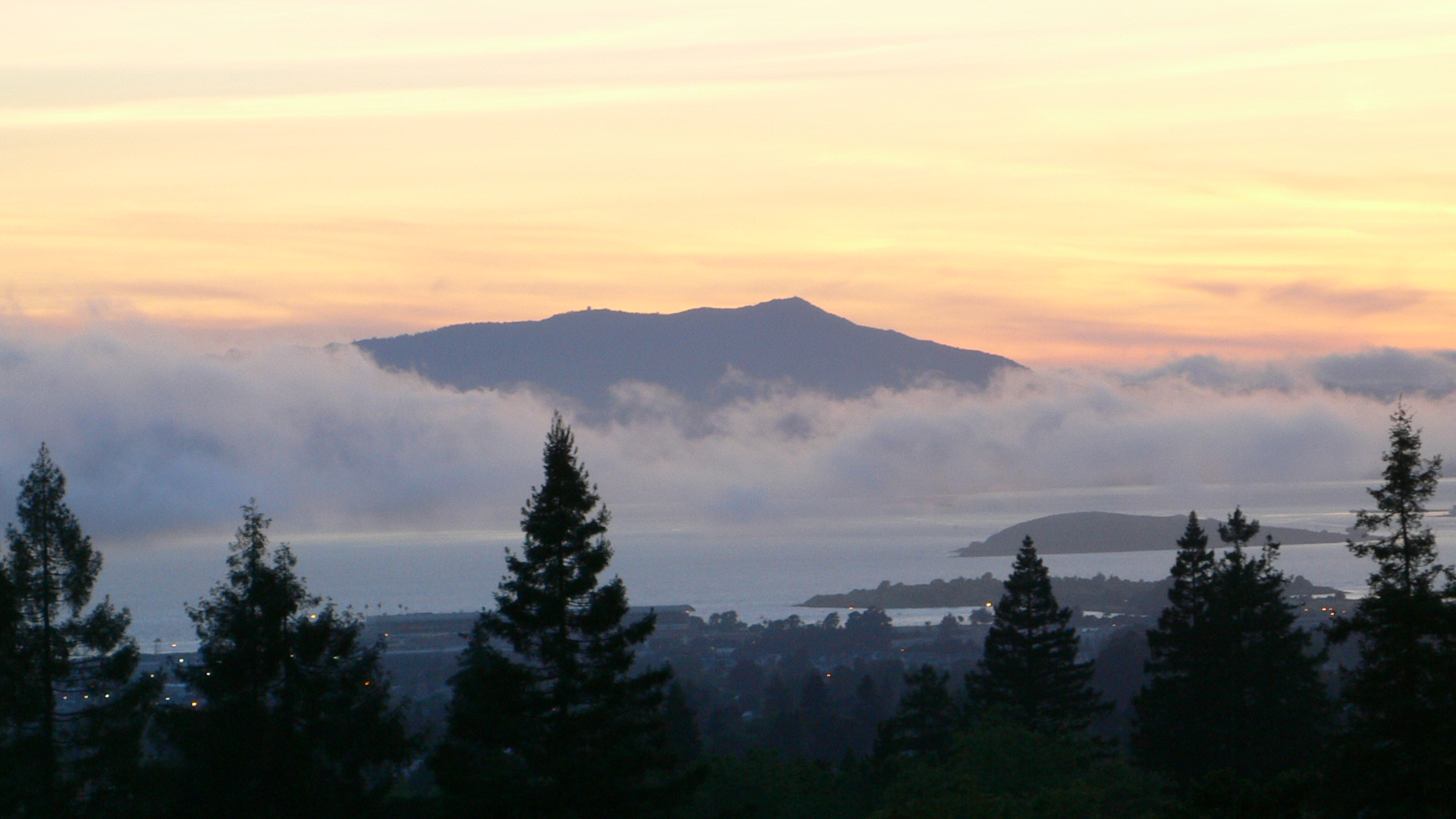
View of Mount Tamalpais at sundown

Mount Tamalpais's peaks rise over the redwood-shaded canyons and rugged grass-covered hills of Marin. Its highest point, East Peak, is 2,571 feet (784 m). During the late 19th Century, Marin County was regarded more as a source of lumber than as place of natural beauty and respite from the densely populated areas just south across the San Francisco Bay.

Mill Valley, located at the base of Mount Tamalpais, was first planned in the late 1880s and incorporated in 1900. The city was named for a sawmill built by John Reed, to cut lumber harvested from the surrounding area. Once the area was logged, the land was divided into parcels and sold as home sites, which at first were primarily vacation residences. The city was served by The Sausalito Land and Ferry Company and the North Pacific Coast Railroad. These provided access to Mill Valley, requiring a short ferry ride across the Bay from San Francisco to Sausalito, then a transfer to the railroad for another brief trip that terminated in Mill Valley. Mount Tamalpais lies only 12 miles (19 km) directly north of San Francisco and five miles (8 km) directly east of the Pacific Ocean.

Due to ease of access provided by the ferry and rail service, entrepreneurs realized the potential for transforming the undeveloped hills north of San Francisco into a recreational destination. Sidney B. Cushing was one such individual. He had recently acquired the Blithedale Hotel summer resort just north of downtown Mill Valley in Corte Madera Canyon. The hills surrounding Mill Valley were steep—requiring a dependable means of transportation for them to become a vacation spot. Rail was the most logical means at the time, and Mount Tamalpais was the most attractive destination for such a line.

=== Formation and construction of the railroad ===
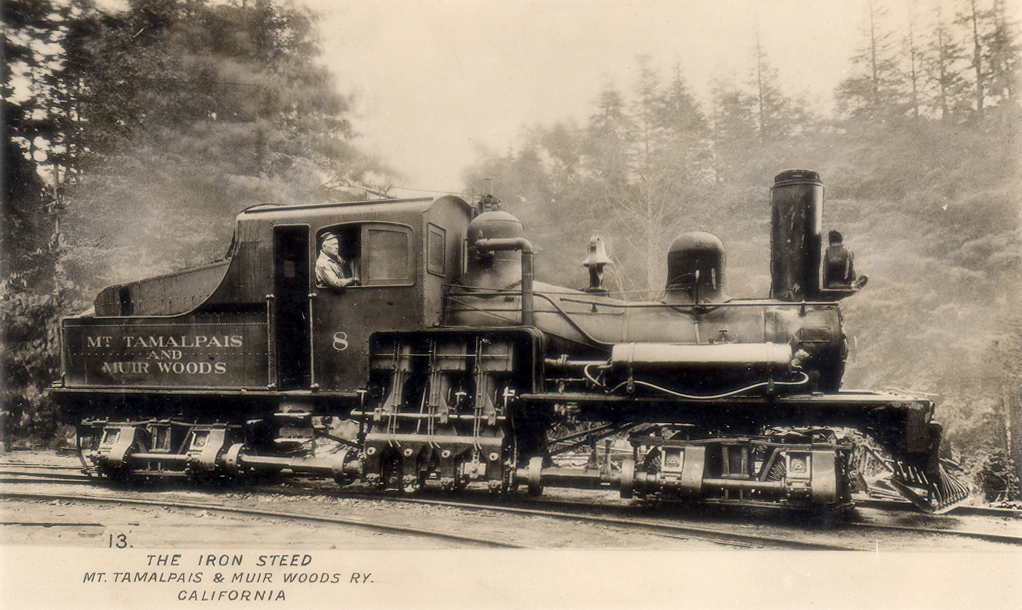
Shay No. 8 under steam amidst a redwood grove on the line

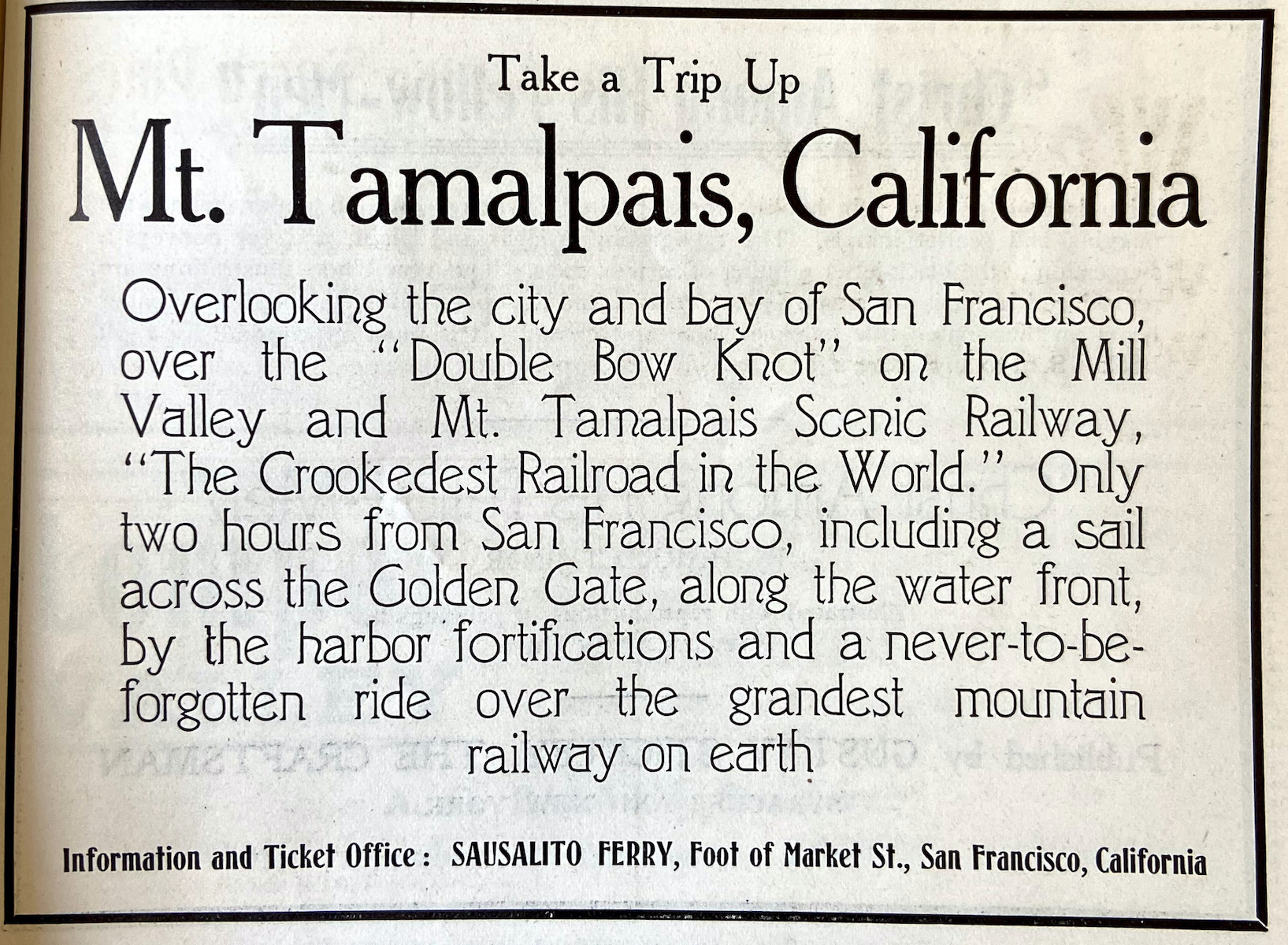
Mill Valley and Mt Tamalpais Scenic Railway advertisement of 1906

Louis L. Janes was the initial impetus behind creating a railroad at Mount Tamalpais. Janes was the resident director of the Tamalpais Land & Water Co. and first town clerk of Mill Valley. Sidney B. Cushing, president of the San Rafael Gas & Electric Co., was chosen as President of the corporation. It was initially named the Mill Valley and Mount Tamalpais Scenic Railway due to the fact the Muir Woods branch had not yet been planned. Funding came from several sources, provided to the corporation in exchange for stock in the company. One influential resident, A. E. Kent, gave the corporation right-of-way through his property in Corte Madera Canyon in exchange for $10,000 in stock. A. E. Kent and his son, William, were early Marin residents who foresaw the region's appeal to visitors from the Bay Area and beyond. William Kent was a Progressive Republican Congressman representing California from 1911 to 1917. Considering his family's financial interests in the railway, Kent spearheaded the movement to form the Muir Woods National Monument, a popular destination on the line.

Construction began on February 5, 1896. Originating at the North Pacific Coast Railroad depot in Mill Valley, the line was planned to ascend the surrounding hills to the summit of Mount Tamalpais, then over the top of the peak and down to Bolinas Beach. The pristine beach was difficult to access, and residents supported the line's planned arrival. This remained only a plan, as did the initial proposal to make the line an electric trolley route. A wagon road was constructed to Willow Camp (Stinson Beach) in 1902 and electric power never supplanted the geared steam locomotives used to construct the line. Supplies and laborers arrived in Mill Valley and began work by February 1896. Over 200 men, an international mix of laborers, graded the route and laid rails. Many left their jobs in protest over poor pay and expensive board — $1.75 a day for 10 hours of work followed by a night at an obligatory boarding house costing $5.25 a week. Despite these labor concerns and some local enmity from residents who opposed noisy locomotives running adjacent to their property, construction ensued. Within six months, the railroad construction was completed at a cost of $55,000; equipment cost an additional $80,000. The last spike was driven on August 18, 1896, with the first passenger train operating just four days later.

== Operation ==
=== Route ===
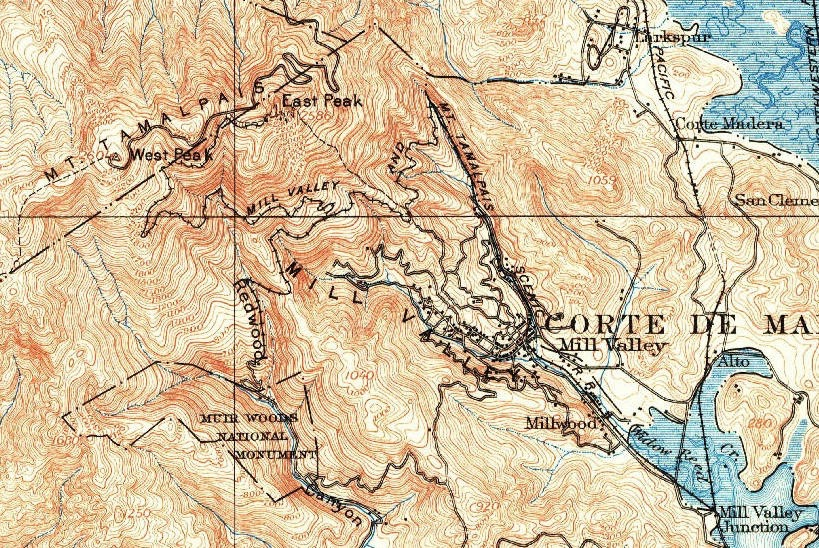
Route through the headlands

The mountain railroad's tracks began at the depot located at 87 Throckmorton Avenue, at an elevation of approximately 70 feet (21 m). This building took several forms through the years, significantly more grandiose and Victorian than the current mission-style depot, today a bookstore and cafe. Trains headed north, across Throckmorton, between two buildings, behind the Masonic Hall and past a water tank and shed at Lovell Avenue. The tracks crossed Corte Madera Avenue and passed the maintenance shop (engine house) at Alcatraz Place. From the depot to King Street, the grade paralleled the Arroyo Corte Madera del Presidio stream that twists through Mill Valley between Blithedale and Corte Madera Avenues. Along the stream, the tracks continued north past the Blithedale Hotel until reaching Milepost One, at an elevation of 300 feet (91 m), approximately where Shady Lane crosses the stream today. At Lee Street the tracks passed a small station and water tank before continuing another 3/4 mile (1.2 km) to Horse Shoe Curve, where the tracks crossed the stream one final time and headed southwest to Milepost Two. A siding was once located at Milepost Two, at an elevation of 400 feet (120 m). Continuing to head southwest, the tracks curved almost a dozen more times before reaching Milepost Three.

The "Double Bow Knot", where the tracks wound back and forth paralleling themselves five times to climb 168 feet in a compact spot only 600 feet wide on the mountainside

The Tavern of Tamalpais was the summit destination of the rail line. The Tavern had overnight accommodations, a restaurant, a post office and a dance pavilion, all a short walk from the peak of the mountain, which is visible in this photo directly above the structure.

At Milepost Three, the route reached an elevation of 700 feet (210 m). Fern Canyon Drive currently follows this section of the old roadbed, including a tight curve at Summit Avenue, followed by numerous curves until reaching Milepost Four, lying just beyond a large home currently located at the end of Fern Canyon Road. From Milepost Four, the roadbed loops around the home and becomes a fire road available to hikers who, from this point, can follow the roadbed to its terminus at the peak.

Milepost Four, at an elevation of 1,000 feet (300 m), was the starting point of the twisting "Double Bow Knot" where the track paralleled itself five times to quickly gain elevation. Within these curves was Mesa Station, a small depot, a siding and water tanks for the steam engines. Just above Mesa was the longest straightaway on the line:413 feet (126 m). A branch from mainline was added at Mesa Junction and headed southwest for Muir Woods, known as Redwood Canyon when it opened in 1907. The first tourists to Muir Woods came on the scenic railway.

Just west of the Double Bow Knot, the tracks reached an elevation of 1,350 feet (410 m) at Milepost Five. Heisler locomotive No. 2 wrecked about 1/4 mile (0.40 km) before Milepost Five on August 22, 1900, killing the engineer, Ernest Thomas. Grease deposits on the rail caused the locomotive to jump the rails and topple down the slope on the south side of the tracks, damaging the locomotive and releasing steam that fatally scalded Ernest Thomas.

From this point, the tracks then headed west past another water tank, reaching Milepost Six at an elevation of 1,730 feet (530 m), where Boot Jack Siding was located. A half mile from Boot Jack the tracks finished their westward climb at the West Point Inn. In a tight 252° turn, they curved around the Inn and pointed east for another half mile to Milepost Seven at an elevation of 2,060 feet (630 m). Milepost Eight was further east up the mountain at an elevation of 2,350 feet (720 m). From here, the tracks wound around a broad curve for just less than a quarter of a mile to the railroad's final destination, Tamalpais Tavern, at an elevation of 2,436 feet (742 m).

=== Curvature ===
The railroad ascended a particularly steep grade from its starting point at the North Pacific Coast depot in Mill Valley — at an elevation of approximately 70 feet (21 m) — to its destination at a tavern just below the summit of Mount Tamalpais, at an elevation of 2,436 feet (742 m). In order to follow a route that steam locomotives could ascend, the track had to maintain a grade that was not excessive. The entire line's average grade was 5%, comprising maximum grades of 7% at some points on the line. As the crow flies, the peak of Mount Tamalpais is only a few miles from Mill Valley. However, a direct approach presented an impracticably steep ascent for the railroad. Thus, it meandered 8.19 miles (13.18 km) up the mountain, cutting its way back and forth across the terrain. According to an article entitled "Geared Locomotives on the Mount Tamalpais Railway" from the July 16, 1898 edition of Scientific American, the mainline had only 3.282 miles (5.282 km) of straight track, with the remainder composed of the following 266 curves:

- 26 curves of 70 feet (21 m) radius, [amounting to a total distance of] 3,641 feet (1,110 m)
- 24 curves of 80 feet (24 m) radius, 2,974 feet (906 m)
- 20 curves of 90 feet (27 m) radius, 2,328 feet (710 m)
- 49 curves of 100 feet (30 m) radius, 4,020 feet (1,230 m)
- 46 curves of 110 to 150 feet (46 m) radius, 4,403 feet (1,342 m)
- 59 curves of 150 to 300 feet (91 m) radius, 4,710 feet (1,440 m)
- 42 curves of 300 feet (91 m) radius and upward, 3,837 feet (1,170 m)

=== Gravity cars ===
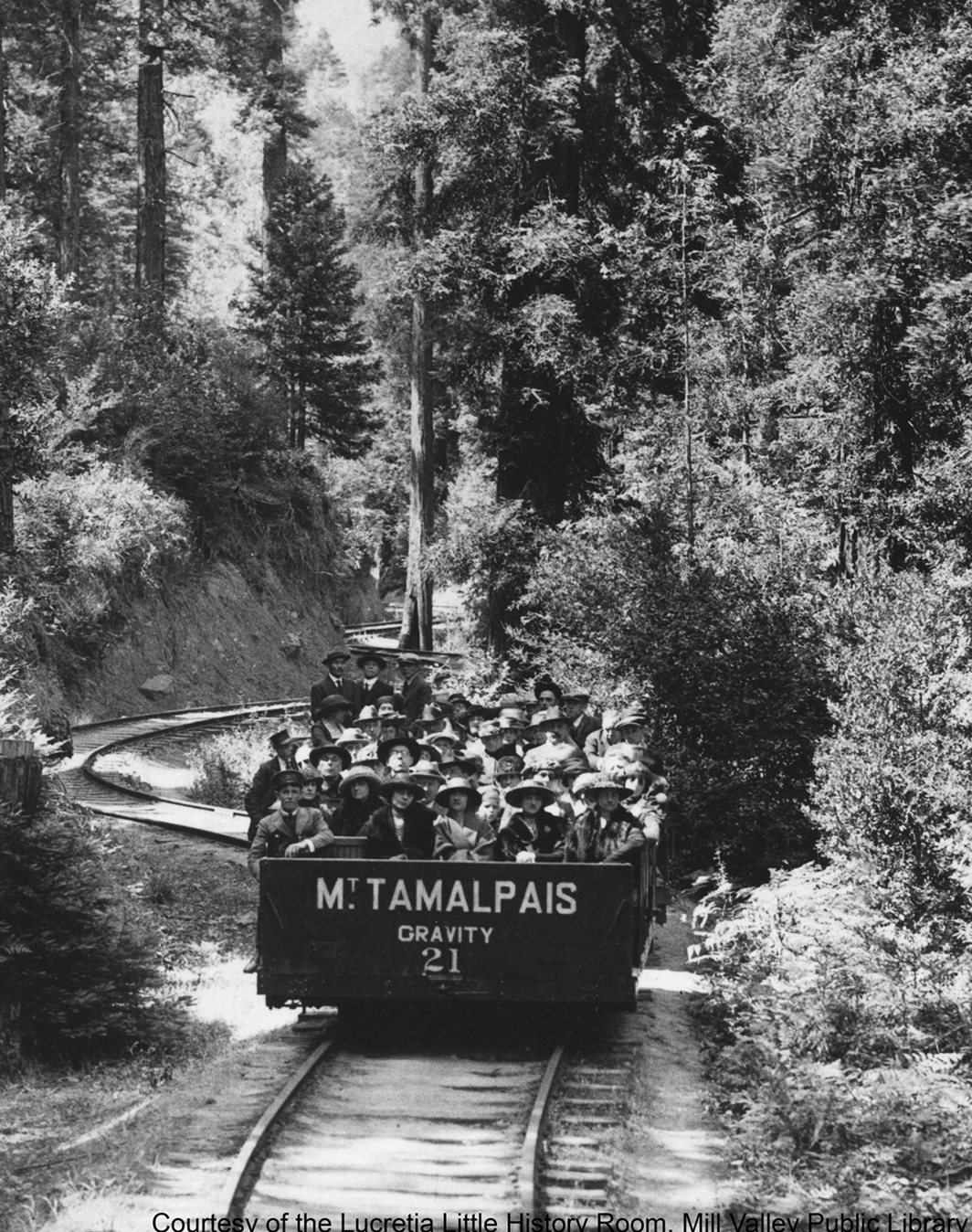
Gravity car no. 21 on the Mt. Tamalpais and Muir Woods Scenic Railway c. 1915

The railroad became famous for its gravity cars — four-wheeled coasters introduced in 1902 that took advantage of the steep, uninterrupted grade. Gravity cars had an operator known as a gravityman who sat in the front-right seat (on most cars) and operated two brake levers that pressed heavy-duty brake shoes against the car's wheels. Gravitymen had strict orders to obey a 12-mile-per-hour (19 km/h) speed limit as they glided down Mt. Tamalpais, either to Muir Woods or into Mill Valley. Gravity cars were towed back to the summit by the regular passenger trains, where they were stored in the yard for the next run.

=== Steam locomotives ===
Road Number	Builder	Type	Works Number	Year built	Weight (lbs)	Notes
No. 498	Lima Locomotive Works	2-truck Shay locomotive	#498	January 29, 1896	40,000	Built for Robert Dollar's Usal Lumber Company, but ran briefly prior to shipment from San Francisco as the first locomotive on the Mount Tamalpais railroad
No. 1	Lima Locomotive Works	2-truck Shay locomotive	#597	March 13, 1900		Sold in 1904 for $2,250 to Deep River Logging Company of Washington
No. 2	Stearns Manufacturing Company	2-truck Heisler locomotive	#1005	1896	60,000	The railroad's only fatal accident occurred when No. 2 derailed, breaking a steam line, fatally burning engineer Ernest Thomas; named the John G. Eastland but referred to as the Bull
No. 3	Stearns Manufacturing Company	2-truck Heisler locomotive		1898	60,000	Named the S.B. Cushing; returned to Stearns due to an unsatisfactory "cab arrangement," hence a replacement No. 3 listed below; once pictured in Scientific American
No. 3	Lima Locomotive Works	2-truck Shay locomotive	#646	April 25, 1901	46,000	Named the Tamalpais; sold to the California & Oregon Power Co. of Hornbrook, CA, in September 1915; used for construction of Hetch Hetchy Reservoir in 1917; sold to Flora Logging Company of Carlton, Oregon in 1923; then to Union Lumber Company of Washington; scrapped October 10, 1929
No. 4	Lima Locomotive Works	2-truck Shay locomotive	#832	August 5, 1903	46,000	Purchased for $6,900; sold 1930; scrapped 1931
No. 5	Lima Locomotive Works	2-truck Shay locomotive	#1666	June 22, 1906		Leased briefly for construction Hetch Hetchy Reservoir in 1917; sold and rebuilt in 1930; shipped 1937 for operation on Mindanao in the Philippines
No. 6	H.K. Porter, Inc.	0-4-0 tank	#3483	1906	36,000	Sold in 1915 for $1,400; scrapped in 1944
No. 7	Lima Locomotive Works	2-truck Shay locomotive	#1945	August 4, 1907	74,000	Sold in 1930 and shipped to the Philippines in 1934
No. 8	Lima Locomotive Works	2-truck Shay locomotive	#2505	April 6, 1912	74,000	Sold in 1931 to Shell Oil for use at a refinery in Martinez, CA; resold to Six Companies, Inc. of Boulder City, Nevada; wrecked and scrapped in 1932
No. 9	Heisler Locomotive Works	2-truck Heisler locomotive	#1446	1920	72,000	Sold in 1924 for $9,750 to Siskiyou Lumber Co. of Macdoel, CA; the only surviving engine from the railroad, on display in Scotia, CA, from 1956 through 2018. Purchased by "Friends of #9" for restoration and display near the site of the railroad.

== Demise ==
On July 2, 1929, a wind-driven wildfire swept down the slopes of Mount Tamalpais through Blithedale Canyon and came within two blocks of the Mill Valley depot as nearly one hundred homes burned. The last train down the mountain carried sixty-five passengers to safety through the smoke. Snakes sought refuge from adjacent flames on the railway and were crushed under the train wheels, making the rails slippery and requiring liberal use of sand to prevent excessive speed. Although the railroad quickly repaired the damaged tracks and resumed service, it stopped for good not long after with the final passenger train running on October 31, 1929. Scrappers began ripping up the tracks in the summer of 1930, finishing not long after.

== Legacy ==
On May 3, 2009, a small museum opened in the former East Peak yard of the Mt. Tamalpais and Muir Woods Railway. The Gravity Car Barn shelters a recreated gravity car that rolls from the barn on 84 feet (26 m) of rail. Volunteer docents from the Friends of Mt. Tam staff the museum on weekends. Displays and a short documentary illustrate the railroad's story.

== See also ==
- Gravity railroad
