= Digalactosyldiacylglycerol synthase =

Class of enzymes

digalactosyldiacylglycerol synthase

Identifiers
- EC no.: 2.4.1.241

Databases
- IntEnz: IntEnz view
- BRENDA: BRENDA entry
- ExPASy: NiceZyme view
- KEGG: KEGG entry
- MetaCyc: metabolic pathway
- PRIAM: profile
- PDB structures: RCSB PDB PDBe PDBsum
- Gene Ontology: AmiGO / QuickGO
Search
- PMC: articles
- PubMed: articles
- NCBI: proteins

In enzymology, a digalactosyldiacylglycerol synthase (EC 2.4.1.241) is an enzyme that catalyzes the chemical reaction

UDP-galactose + 3-(beta-D-galactosyl)-1,2-diacyl-sn-glycerol $\rightleftharpoons$ UDP + 3-[alpha-D-galactosyl-(1->6)-beta-D-galactosyl]-1,2-diacyl-sn- glycerol

Thus, the two substrates of this enzyme are UDP-galactose and 3-(beta-D-galactosyl)-1,2-diacyl-sn-glycerol, whereas its 3 products are UDP, [[3-[alpha-D-galactosyl-(1->6)-beta-D-galactosyl]-1,2-diacyl-sn-]], and glycerol.

This enzyme belongs to the family of glycosyltransferases, specifically the hexosyltransferases. The systematic name of this enzyme class is UDP-galactose:3-(beta-D-galactosyl)-1,2-diacyl-sn-glycerol 6-alpha-galactosyltransferase. Other names in common use include DGD1, DGD2, DGDG synthase (ambiguous), UDP-galactose-dependent DGDG synthase, UDP-galactose-dependent digalactosyldiacylglycerol synthase, and UDP-galactose:MGDG galactosyltransferase. This enzyme participates in glycerolipid metabolism.
