= Glutathione hydrolase =

Identifiers
- EC no.: 3.4.19.13

Databases
- IntEnz: IntEnz view
- BRENDA: BRENDA entry
- ExPASy: NiceZyme view
- KEGG: KEGG entry
- MetaCyc: metabolic pathway
- PRIAM: profile
- PDB structures: RCSB PDB PDBe PDBsum
Search
- PMC: articles
- PubMed: articles
- NCBI: proteins

Glutathione hydrolase (EC 3.4.19.13, glutathionase, GGT, gamma-glutamyltranspeptidase) is an enzyme. This enzyme catalyses the following chemical reaction

glutathione + H_{2}O $\rightleftharpoons$ L-cysteinylglycine + L-glutamate

This protein also acts as enzyme EC 2.3.2.2 (gamma-glutamyltransferase).
