= Galactolipid galactosyltransferase =

Class of enzymes

galactolipid galactosyltransferase

Identifiers
- EC no.: 2.4.1.184
- CAS no.: 66676-74-2

Databases
- IntEnz: IntEnz view
- BRENDA: BRENDA entry
- ExPASy: NiceZyme view
- KEGG: KEGG entry
- MetaCyc: metabolic pathway
- PRIAM: profile
- PDB structures: RCSB PDB PDBe PDBsum
- Gene Ontology: AmiGO / QuickGO
Search
- PMC: articles
- PubMed: articles
- NCBI: proteins

In enzymology, a galactolipid galactosyltransferase (EC 2.4.1.184) is an enzyme that catalyzes the chemical reaction

2 3-(beta-D-galactosyl)-1,2-diacyl-sn-glycerol $\rightleftharpoons$ 3-[alpha-D-galactosyl-(1->6)-beta-D-galactosyl]-1,2-diacyl-sn- glycerol + 1,2-diacyl-sn-glycerol

Hence, this enzyme has one substrate, 3-(beta-D-galactosyl)-1,2-diacyl-sn-glycerol, but 3 products: [[3-[alpha-D-galactosyl-(1->6)-beta-D-galactosyl]-1,2-diacyl-sn-]], glycerol, and 1,2-diacyl-sn-glycerol.

This enzyme belongs to the family of glycosyltransferases, specifically the hexosyltransferases. The systematic name of this enzyme class is 3-(beta-D-galactosyl)-1,2-diacyl-sn-glycerol:mono-3-(beta-D-galactos yl)-1,2-diacyl-sn-glycerol beta-D-galactosyltransferase. Other names in common use include galactolipid-galactolipid galactosyltransferase, galactolipid:galactolipid galactosyltransferase, interlipid galactosyltransferase, GGGT, DGDG synthase (ambiguous), and digalactosyldiacylglycerol synthase (ambiguous). This enzyme participates in glycerolipid metabolism.
