= Marin Transit =

Public bus agency in California, US

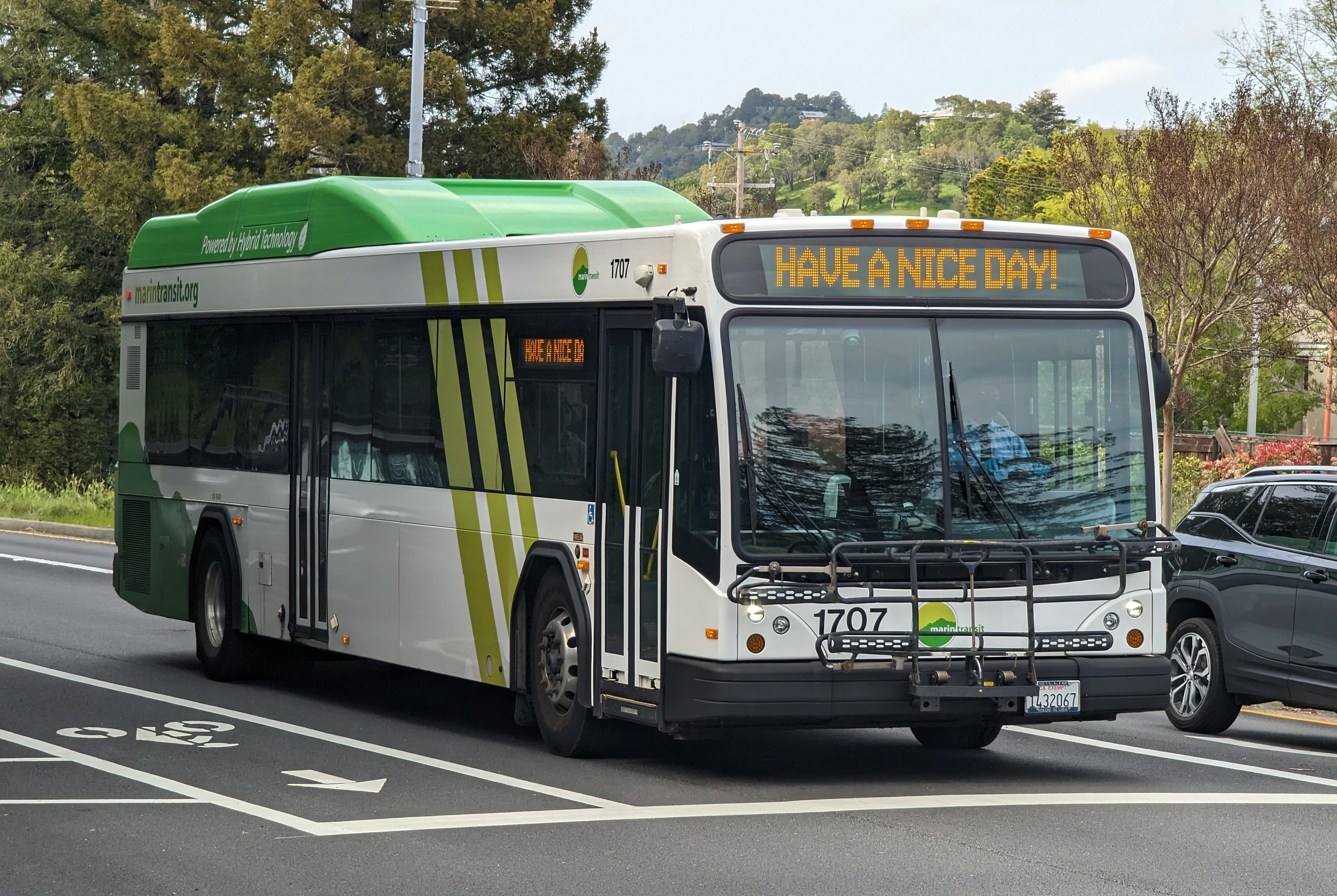
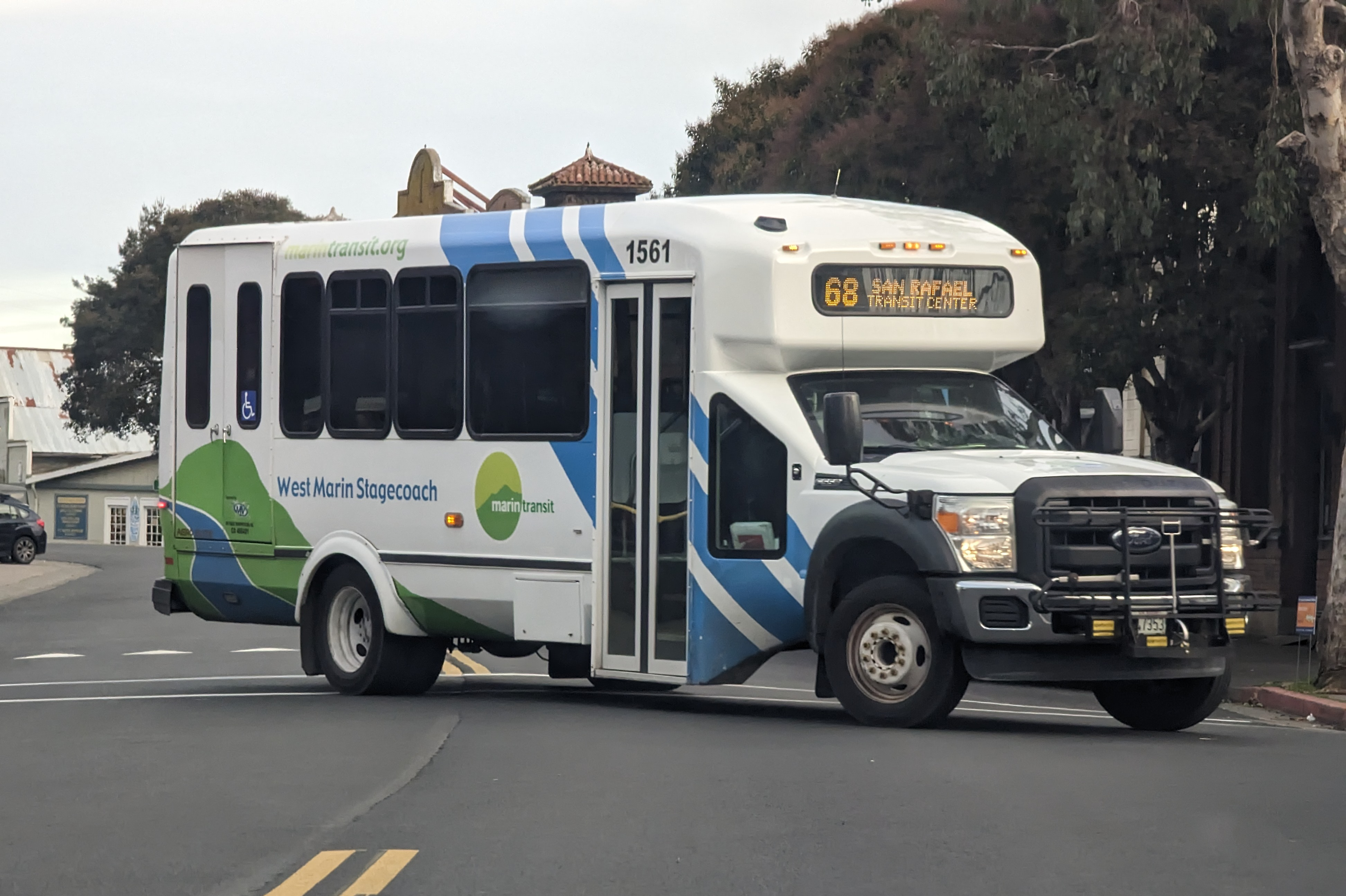
- Marin Transit local and Stagecoach buses
- Founded: 1964
- Headquarters: 711 Grand Avenue, Suite 110, San Rafael
- Service area: Marin County, California
- Service type: Bus; Demand response; Paratransit; School bus
- Routes: 20
- Hubs: San Rafael Transit Center
- Stations: Marin City: Donahue & Terners; Novato: Redwood & Grant; San Anselmo: San Anselmo Hub (Center & Sir Francis Drake)
- Daily ridership: 10,200 (weekdays, Q1 2026)
- Annual ridership: 3,194,600 (2025)
- Operator: Marin Airporter; Golden Gate Transit; Transdev; Bauer's Intelligent Transportation
- Chief executive: Nancy E. Whelan
- Website: marintransit.gov

Marin Transit is a public bus agency serving Marin County, California, in the North Bay region of the San Francisco Bay Area. Marin Transit provides local and rural fixed-route bus services, paratransit services, and school bus services in Marin County, funded by local, state, and federal funds.

Marin Transit was founded in 1964 as the Marin County Transit District, which continues as the agency's legal name. Marin Transit coordinates the planning, scheduling, and marketing for its services, which are operated by four independent operators under the Marin Transit brand. In 2025, the system had a ridership of 3,194,600, or about 10,200 per weekday as of the first quarter of 2026.

== History ==
Marin Transit was formed by a vote of the people of Marin County in 1964 and was given the responsibility for providing local transit service within Marin County. It has since played a key role in providing local transit service within the county through various funding sources (Measure A Funds, State Transportation Development Act Funds, fares, property taxes and Federal Section 5311 rural transit funds).

== Fixed-route bus service ==
Marin Transit serves all major cities, towns, and communities within Marin County except Muir Beach, Nicasio, and Peacock Gap (East San Rafael). Route information listed below is current as of April 12, 2026.

See Golden Gate Transit for information on Regional and Commute bus routes serving Marin County, which have no affiliation with Marin Transit.

=== Local service ===
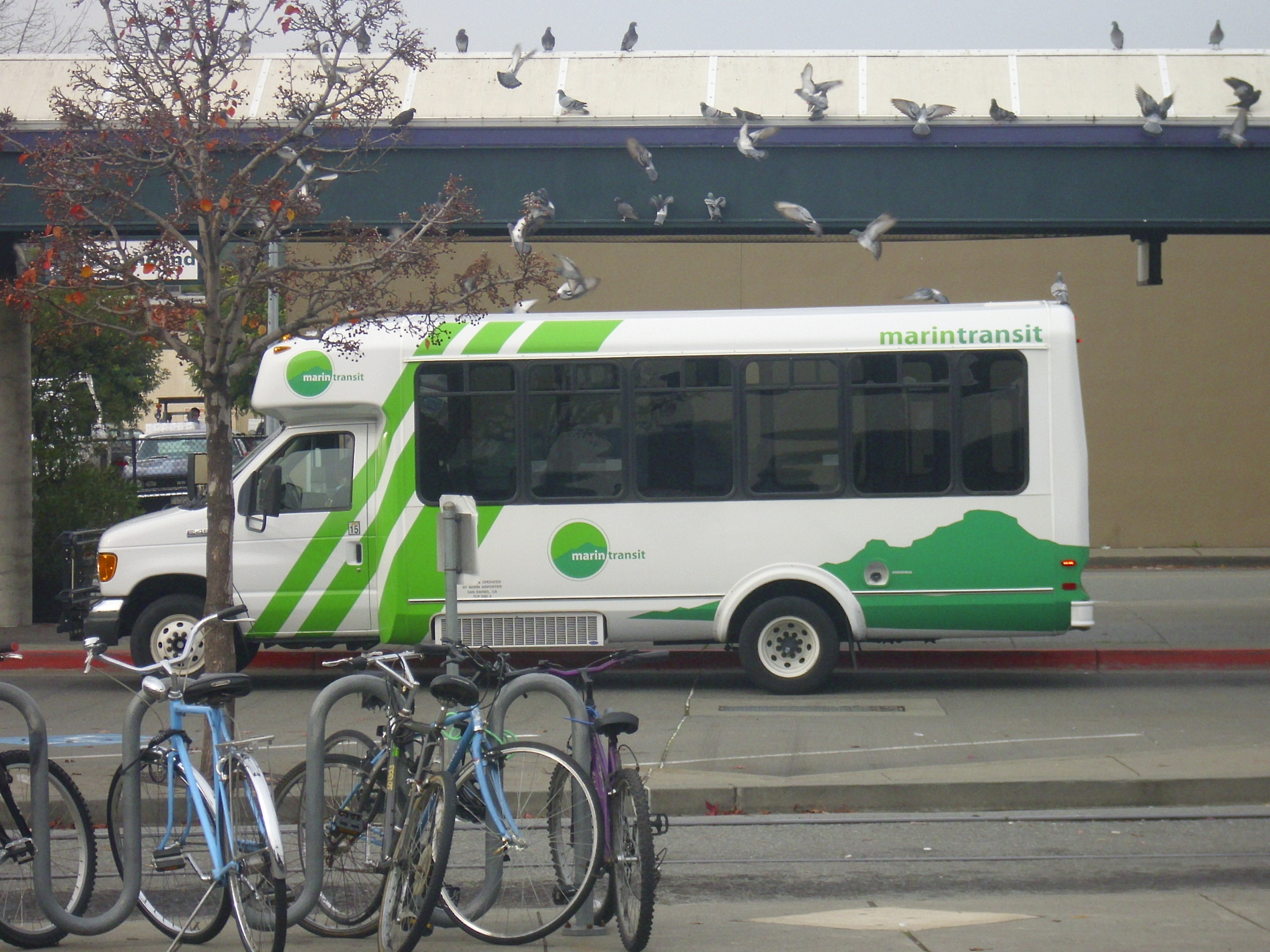
A Marin Transit bus operating on Route 233 at the San Rafael Transit Center.

| Route | Direction | Terminals | | Days of Operation | Cities, Communities, and Attractions Served | Schedule Information |
| Route | Direction | North/East Terminal | South/West Terminal | Days of Operation | Cities, Communities, and Attractions Served | Schedule Information |
|---|---|---|---|---|---|---|
| 17 | North-south | San Rafael Transit Center | Sausalito Ferry Terminal | Daily | San Rafael, Larkspur Landing, Larkspur, Corte Madera, Strawberry, Mill Valley, Tam Valley, Marin City, Sausalito | Route 17 Schedule |
| 22 | North-south | San Rafael Transit Center | Marin City (Donahue & Terners) | Daily | San Rafael, San Anselmo, Ross, College of Marin, Larkspur, Corte Madera, Mill Valley, Marin City | Route 22 Schedule |
| 23 | East-west | San Rafael (Shoreline Parkway at Target) | Fairfax (Sir Francis Drake & Olema) | Daily | Canal, San Rafael, San Anselmo, Fairfax | Route 23 Schedule |
| 30 | North-south | San Rafael Transit Center | Canal (Kerner & Larkspur) | Daily | San Rafael, Canal | Route 30 Schedule |
| 35 | North-south | Northgate Shopping Center | Canal (Kerner & Larkspur) | Daily | Terra Linda High School, Northgate, Marin Civic Center, San Rafael, Canal | Route 35 Schedule |
| 36 | North-south | Canal (Kerner & Larkspur) | Marin City (Donahue & Terners) | Daily | Canal, San Rafael, Larkspur, Corte Madera, Strawberry, Mill Valley, Marin City | Route 36 Schedule |
| 49 | North-south | Novato (San Marin SMART Station) | San Rafael Transit Center | Daily | Novato, Ignacio, Hamilton, Terra Linda, Northgate, Marin Civic Center, San Rafael | Route 49 Schedule |
| 57 | North-south | Novato (San Marin SMART Station) | San Rafael Transit Center | Weekdays | Novato, Ignacio, Alameda del Prado, Hamilton, Las Gallinas, San Rafael | Route 57 Schedule |
| 57 | North-south | Novato (San Marin SMART Station) | Select Weekday and All Weekend Trips: Hamilton Theatre Lot (Palm Dr and S Palm Dr) | Daily | Novato, Ignacio, Alameda del Prado, Hamilton, Las Gallinas, San Rafael | Route 57 Schedule |
| 71 | North-south | Novato (San Marin SMART Station) | Marin City (Donahue & Terners) | Daily | Novato, Ignacio, San Rafael, Larkspur, Corte Madera, Mill Valley, Marin City | Route 71 Schedule |
| 219 | East-west | Tiburon (Ferry Terminal) | Strawberry (Reed & Belvedere) | Daily | Tiburon, Belvedere, Strawberry | Route 219 Schedule |
| 228 | East-west | San Rafael Transit Center | Fairfax Manor (Sir Francis Drake & Glen) | Daily | San Rafael, Larkspur Landing, Greenbrae, Marin General Hospital, Kentfield, Ross, San Anselmo, Fairfax, Manor | Route 228 Schedule |
| 233 | North-south | Santa Venetia (Vendola & Estancia) | San Rafael Transit Center | Daily | Santa Venetia, Marin Civic Center, Dominican University, San Rafael | Route 233 Schedule |
| 245 | North-south | Terra Linda (Smith Ranch & Yosemite) | San Rafael Transit Center | Daily | Terra Linda, Kaiser Hospital, Northgate, San Rafael | Route 245 Schedule |

Note: Italicized locations are served on select trips only.

=== West Marin Stagecoach rural service ===
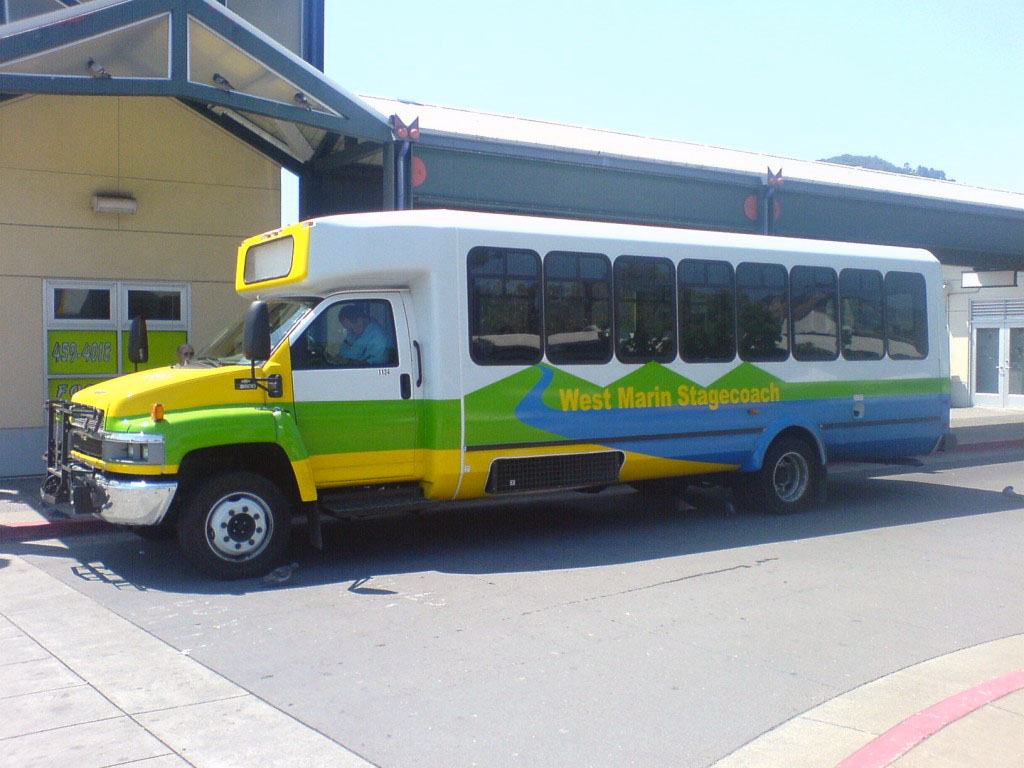
A West Marin Stagecoach bus operating on Route 68 at the San Rafael Transit Center.

| Route | Direction | Terminals | | Days of Operation | Cities, Communities, and Attractions Served | Schedule Information |
| Route | Direction | North/East Terminal | South/West Terminal | Days of Operation | Cities, Communities, and Attractions Served | Schedule Information |
|---|---|---|---|---|---|---|
| 61 | East-west | Sausalito (Sausalito Ferry Terminal) | Bolinas (Wharf & Brighton) | Daily | Sausalito, Marin City, Tam Valley, Tamalpais High School, Mount Tamalpais State Park (Bootjack and Pantoll Campgrounds), Stinson Beach, Bolinas | Route 61 Schedule |
| 68 | East-west | San Rafael Transit Center | Inverness (Sir Francis Drake & Inverness) | Daily | San Rafael, San Anselmo, Archie Williams High School, Fairfax, Manor, San Geronimo, Forest Knolls, Lagunitas, Samuel P. Taylor State Park, Olema, Point Reyes Station, Inverness | Route 68 Schedule |

=== Supplemental service ===
Supplemental routes operate on school days only.

| Route | Direction | Schools Served | Cities and Communities Served | Schedule Information |
|---|---|---|---|---|
| 613 | East-west | Redwood High School, Hall Middle School | Larkspur, Corte Madera, Paradise Cay | Route 613 Schedule |
| 619 | East-west | Redwood High School | Tiburon, Belvedere, Strawberry | Route 619 Schedule |
| 625 | East-west | Archie Williams High School, Lagunitas School | San Rafael, San Anselmo, Fairfax, Manor, Woodacre, Lagunitas | Route 625 Schedule |
| 629 | East-west | Redwood High School, Hall Middle School | Corte Madera, Paradise Cay | Route 629 Schedule |
| 654 | East-west | San Marin High School, Sinaloa Middle School | Novato, San Marin | Route 654 Schedule |

== Demand-Response and other services ==
In addition to fixed route services, Marin Transit provides intra- and inter-county complimentary ADA paratransit (Marin Access) service.

Marin Access also administers a voucher-based transportation reimbursement program (Marin Transit Catch-a-Ride), a volunteer driver reimbursement program (Marin Transit STAR Program), travel training programs, and a network of countywide mobility shuttles (Marin Access Shuttles).

=== Marin Access ===
Complementary paratransit service, as mandated by the Americans with Disabilities Act (ADA), is operated within Marin County using the Marin Access name. Service is available to eligible passengers by reservation only.

As part of the interagency operations agreement between the Marin County Transit District and the Golden Gate Bridge, Highway, and Transportation District, all paratransit for the Golden Gate Transit regional network is also provided by Marin Access.

==== Volunteer Driver Program ====
The Volunteer Driver Program empowers older adults and people with disabilities to remain independent by providing a mileage reimbursement for their friends, neighbors, and other community members who provide them with rides. This program does not provide a pool of volunteer drivers, but rather allows the rider to find their own trusted driver and provide a mileage reimbursement. A caregiver, friend, or neighbor may be a driver.

==== Travel Training Program ====
Marin Transit offers group and individualized Travel Training Programs to help riders become more informed and independent. Staff will teach program participants about transportation programs and services available through Marin Transit and Marin Access. Individualized, one-on-one travel trainings aboard fixed route vehicles are also available to help participants learn to ride in a 'real-world' environment with ease.

==== Marin Access Shuttle Program ====
The Marin Access Shuttles provide a curb to curb service within specific service areas. Advance reservations are required, and rides can be scheduled up to seven days in advance.

=== Home to School Student Transportation ===
Marin Transit is the only public transit agency in the United States that provides dedicated home to school student transportation operated by yellow school buses, in additional to supplemental service provided by regular fixed route vehicles. Service is provided to the White Hill Middle School and the Hidden Valley Elementary School, both belonging to the Ross Valley School District, and is provided under the oversight of the Ross Valley Joint Exercise of Powers Agreement (JEPA). The JEPA board, made up of local elected officials, set the pass price, service schedule, and approves the contracted agreement between Marin Transit and the operator of the service.

=== Muir Woods Shuttle ===
Provided through a partnership with the National Park Service, Marin Transit provides staffing, operations support, and contract oversight for a seasonal, recreational shuttle to the Muir Woods National Monument. The shuttle runs weekends between late Spring and the early Fall, and adds additional weekday service in the peak summer period.

== Fares ==
All Marin Transit fixed-route fares and passes are also valid on Golden Gate Transit bus routes within Marin County. Fares are paid by Clipper card or cash.

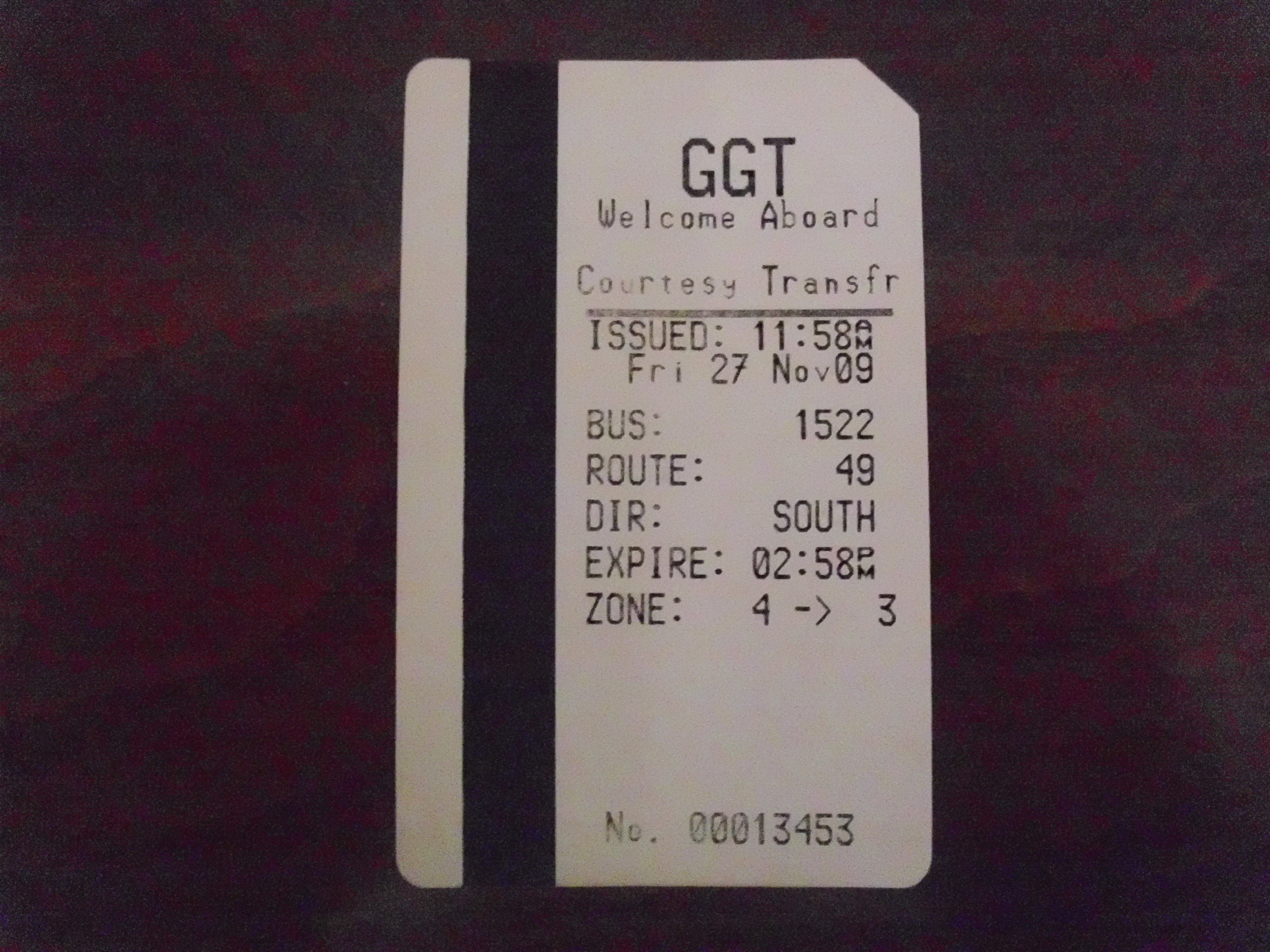
A Golden Gate Transit local transfer (issued on a Marin Transit route) that allows a 3-hour travel period within Marin County.

=== Fixed-route fares ===
These fares do not apply to the Muir Woods Shuttle. See Muir Woods Shuttle fares in the following section.

| Fare category | Cash fare | Clipper fare | 1-day pass |
|---|---|---|---|
| Adult | $2.00 | $1.80 | $5.00 |
| Youth (ages 5 through 18) | $1.00 | $1.00 | $2.50 |
| Senior (ages 65 and over), Disabled, or Medicare | $1.00 | $1.00 | $2.50 |

Notes:

- Up to two children ages 4 and under ride free with an adult.
- College of Marin students ride free with a validated COM card.
- Transfers are issued free upon payment and are valid for one-way travel on all Marin Transit and Golden Gate Transit routes within Marin County for 3 hours. Clipper automatically calculates transfers.

The school-based Marin Transit Youth Pass is available to students between 5 and 18 years of age through Marin County schools. Passes are available $325.00 for the school year. Passes allow unlimited rides on all Marin Transit fixed routes. However, unlike other Marin Transit fare media, the passes are not valid on any Golden Gate Transit bus routes.

=== Marin Access fares ===
Fares for Marin Access paratransit service are based on the origin and destination of travel. Trips provided within the mandated service area in Marin County are charged a flat $4.00 fare. For all service outside of Marin County, fares and zone boundaries are set by Golden Gate Transit.

The fares below are effective as of July 1, 2025.

| Zone | Zone 1 San Francisco | Zone 2 Sausalito, Marin City, Mill Valley, Tiburon | Zone 3 Corte Madera, Larkspur, San Anselmo, San Rafael | Zone 4 Ignacio, Hamilton, Novato | Zone 5 Petaluma, Cotati, Rohnert Park | Zone 6 Santa Rosa | Zone 7 Richmond, El Cerrito |
|---|---|---|---|---|---|---|---|
| Zone 1 San Francisco | N/A^{1} | $17.50^{G} | | $20.00^{G} | $29.00^{G} | | $11.00^{G} |
| Zone 2 Sausalito, Marin City, Mill Valley, Tiburon | $17.50^{G} | $4.00^{M} | | | $20.00^{G} | | $15.00^{G} |
| Zone 3 Corte Madera, Larkspur, San Anselmo, San Rafael | $17.50^{G} | $4.00^{M} | | | $20.00^{G} | | $15.00^{G} |
| Zone 4 Ignacio, Hamilton, Novato | $20.00^{G} | $4.00^{M} | | | $16.50^{G} | | $15.00^{G} |
| Zone 5 Petaluma, Cotati, Rohnert Park | $29.50^{G} | $20.00^{G} | | $16.50^{G} | $6.00^{G} | | $27.00^{G} |
| Zone 6 Santa Rosa | $29.50^{G} | $20.00^{G} | | $16.50^{G} | $6.00^{G} | | $27.00^{G} |
| Zone 7 Richmond, El Cerrito | $11.00^{G} | $15.00^{G} | | | $27.00^{G} | | N/A^{2} |

^{1 - Service provided by SF Paratransit.}
^{2 - Service provided by East Bay Paratransit.}
^{G - Fare set by Golden Gate Transit.}
^{M - Fare set by Marin Transit.}

=== Other Program fares ===
==== Muir Woods Shuttle fares ====
Round-trip fares on the Muir Woods Shuttle are $4.00 for adults (ages 16 and over). Passengers 15 and under ride free, limit 2 per fare paying adult. No one-way fares are available. Marin Transit fare media and Clipper cards are not accepted. Fares must be purchased online prior to boarding.

==== Marin Access Shuttle fares ====
One way fares are $4.00 for general public and $2.00 for youth, seniors, and persons with disabilities. Clipper cards are not accepted on any demand-response services.

==== Home to School Transportation fares ====
Yellow Bus passes are available to students based on a first come, first served basis. Pass price is approved by the JEPA board before the start of the school year.

Passes are sold for the entire year, per direction. The current pass price is $675. The current reduced-income pass price, subject to verification and approval by the Ross Valley School District, is $75.

== Fleet ==
As of 2024, Marin Transit owns a fleet of approximately 105 vehicles for fixed route and demand response service. On August 5, 2024, Marin Transit had a full zero-emission fleet replacement plan approved by their Board of Directors.

== See also ==
- Golden Gate Transit
- Sonoma-Marin Area Rail Transit
- San Rafael Transit Center
- Marin County
- North Bay (San Francisco Bay Area)
