= Golden Gate Transit =

Public transit operator in the North Bay region of California

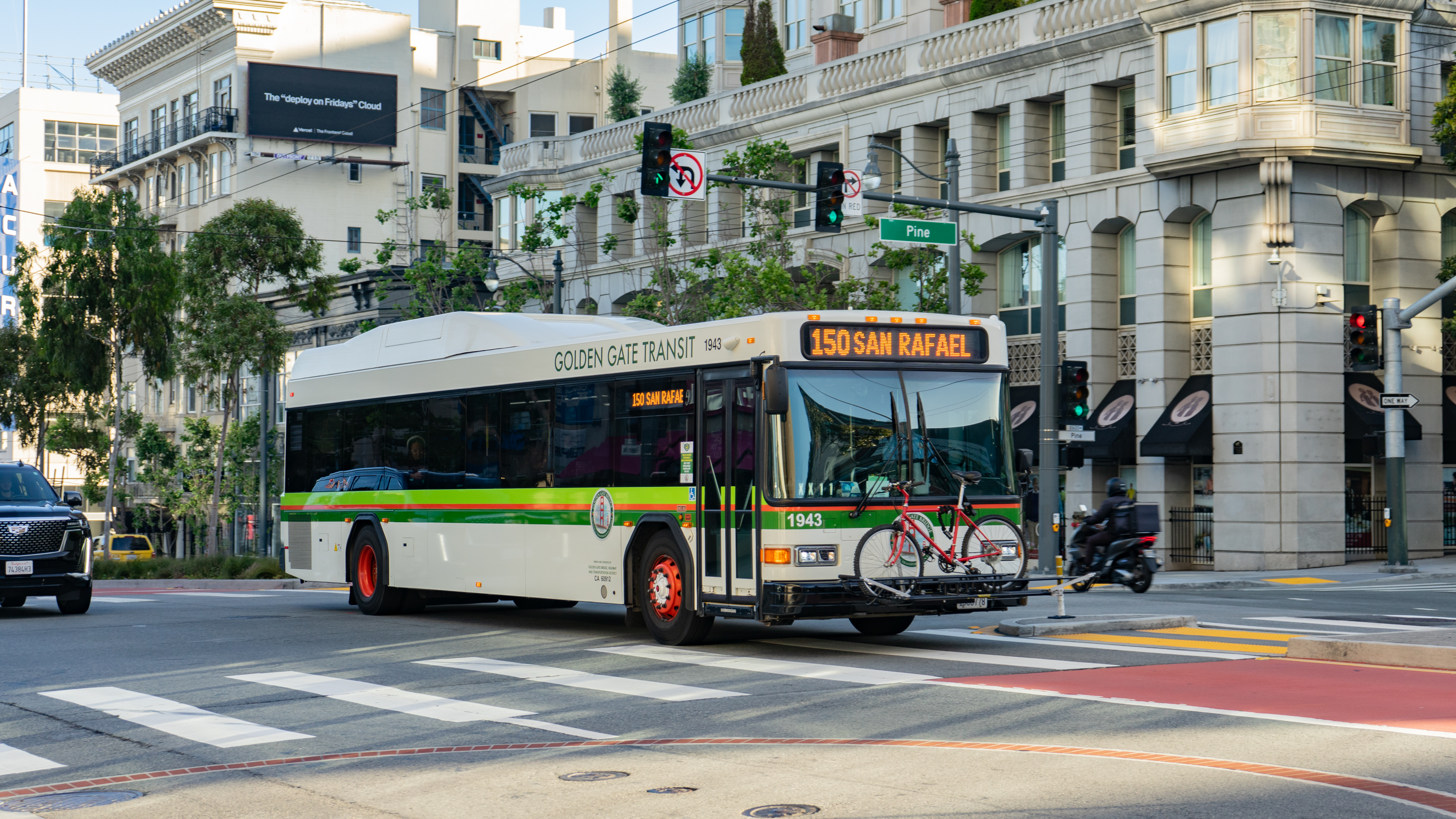
- Golden Gate Transit bus in San Francisco
- Parent: Golden Gate Bridge, Highway and Transportation District
- Founded: January 1, 1972
- Headquarters: 1011 Andersen Drive; San Rafael, California
- Service area: San Francisco Bay Area (San Francisco, Marin, Sonoma, and Contra Costa Counties)
- Service type: bus service
- Routes: 9
- Stops: 246
- Hubs: Copeland Street Transit Mall (Petaluma), Donahue & Terners (Marin City), Redwood & Grant (Novato)
- Stations: El Cerrito del Norte BART, San Rafael Transit Center, Santa Rosa Transit Mall
- Fleet: 124 buses
- Daily ridership: 6,000 (weekdays, Q2 2026)
- Annual ridership: 1,575,600 (2025)
- Website: goldengate.org/bus

Golden Gate Transit (GGT) is a public transit operator serving the North Bay region of the San Francisco Bay Area in California, United States. It primarily serves Marin County, Sonoma County, and San Francisco, and also provides limited service to Contra Costa County. In 2025, Golden Gate Transit had a ridership of 1,575,600, or about 6,000 per weekday as of the second quarter of 2026.

Golden Gate Transit is one of three transportation systems owned and operated by the Golden Gate Bridge, Highway and Transportation District; the others are the Golden Gate Bridge and Golden Gate Ferry, both of which connect San Francisco and Marin County. Funding for cross-bridge "Transbay" bus service is partially funded by Golden Gate Bridge tolls in addition to traditional federal and state sources. GGT operates some bus service within Marin County under contract with Marin Transit.

== History ==
Golden Gate Transit service began on January 1, 1972, as the culmination of years of work for the Golden Gate Bridge to alleviate traffic congestion, reduce pollution, and take over unprofitable commuter bus service operated by Greyhound. GGT had previously began operating local bus service in Marin County under contract with Marin Transit beginning December 15, 1971. Initial service ran on two corridors in San Francisco: Civic Center routes on Van Ness Avenue and the McAllister/Golden Gate one way pair, and Financial District routes on North Point Street and the Battery/Sansome pair.

The system initially operated with 152 buses, including 20 leased buses, out of garages in Novato and Santa Rosa and a temporary facility in San Rafael. A permanent garage opened in San Rafael in 1974, and the facility was expanded in 1987 to house additional administrative staff. Transbay commuter bus service was reduced in 1987 as a result of declining ridership associated with a shift in jobs from San Francisco to Bay Area suburbs. However, that increase in the number of suburban jobs led to the initiation of commuter bus service from Sonoma County to Marin County employment centers in 1990.

In 1992, the District opened the San Rafael Transit Center. The transit station was designed as the hub in a hub-and-spoke local bus system and immediately became GGT's busiest transit station. In 1993, acting on behalf of MTC, GGT began operating service between Marin and Contra Costa counties via the Richmond–San Rafael Bridge. That same year, the district initiated inter-county paratransit service, as required by the Americans with Disabilities Act, through an agreement with Marin County and its paratransit contractor, Whistlestop Wheels.

Significant service reductions were implemented in 2003 as a result of a declared fiscal emergency. As a result of the restructuring, all GGT service to the Sonoma Valley and Sebastopol was eliminated. Ferry Feeder bus routes to the ferry terminals in Larkspur and Sausalito were also discontinued. This fiscal emergency helped spur the passage of Measure A by Marin County voters in 2004. The sales tax measure established a new funding source for Marin Transit and was a catalyst for changes to the contract the District had with Marin Transit. Marin Transit assumed control over local bus service planning, and it began transitioning some service to private contractors.

On June 15, 2009, Golden Gate Transit began operating Route 101, which provides all-day service between Santa Rosa and San Francisco with fewer stops, similar to many bus rapid transit "light" systems that rely on stop spacing changes rather than capital improvements to speed up buses. Introduced initially as a weekday-only route, service was expanded to Saturdays in June 2010 and to Sundays and holidays in September 2011.

On December 13, 2015, service to Contra Costa County on Route 42 was merged with Route 40. The next day, service began on Route 580, which was the District's first transit line into nearby Alameda County. The latter experiment failed and Route 580 was discontinued in September 2016, however the numeric designation was revived when Route 40 was renumbered to Route 580 in December 2021. GGT buses returned to Alameda County in February 2019 to provide Early Bird Express bus service under contract with BART, which was discontinued in January 2024.

As a result of declining ridership due to the COVID-19 pandemic and the resulting loss in operating revenue, including a reduction in Golden Gate Bridge tolls, bus service was dramatically reduced throughout 2020. GGT had 27 routes at the beginning of the pandemic and just seven routes by December 2020. In March 2022, Route 4 was revived as Route 114. Limited additional service was restored in January 2024 with the addition of Routes 164 and 172X and April 2024 with the addition of Route 580X.

== Service area ==
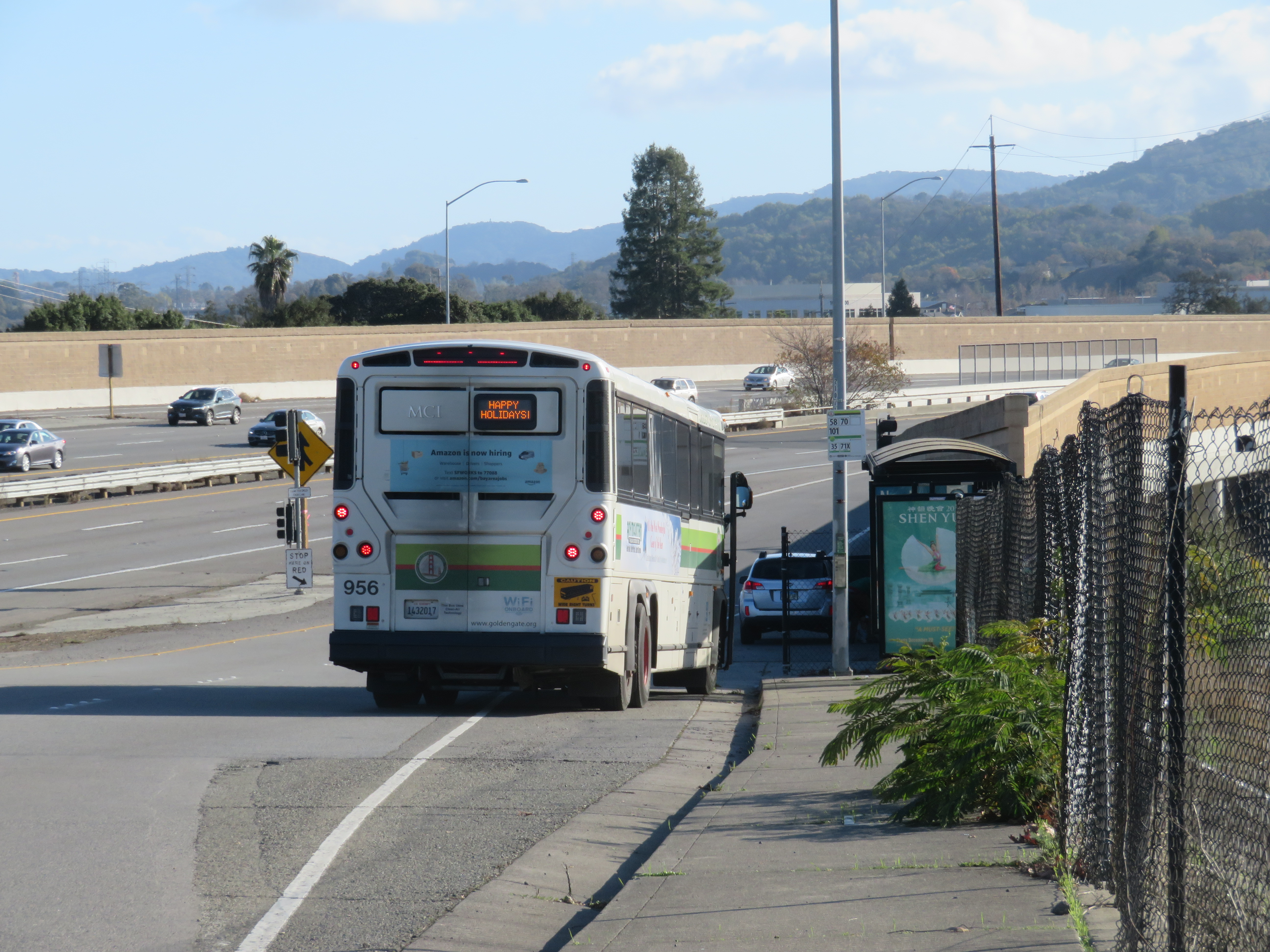
Golden Gate Transit operates multiple services along the Redwood Highway, serving local stops at freeway interchanges

Golden Gate Transit serves cities and communities in four Bay Area counties: San Francisco, Marin, Sonoma, and Contra Costa.

=== Cities and communities served ===
County	Cities and communities
Contra Costa County	El Cerrito, Point Richmond, Richmond
Marin County	Corte Madera, Ignacio, Larkspur, Marin City, Marinwood, Mill Valley, Novato, San Rafael, Sausalito, Strawberry, Terra Linda
San Francisco	Civic Center, Financial District, Marina District, The Presidio, SoMa
Sonoma County	Petaluma, Rohnert Park, Santa Rosa

== Fleet ==
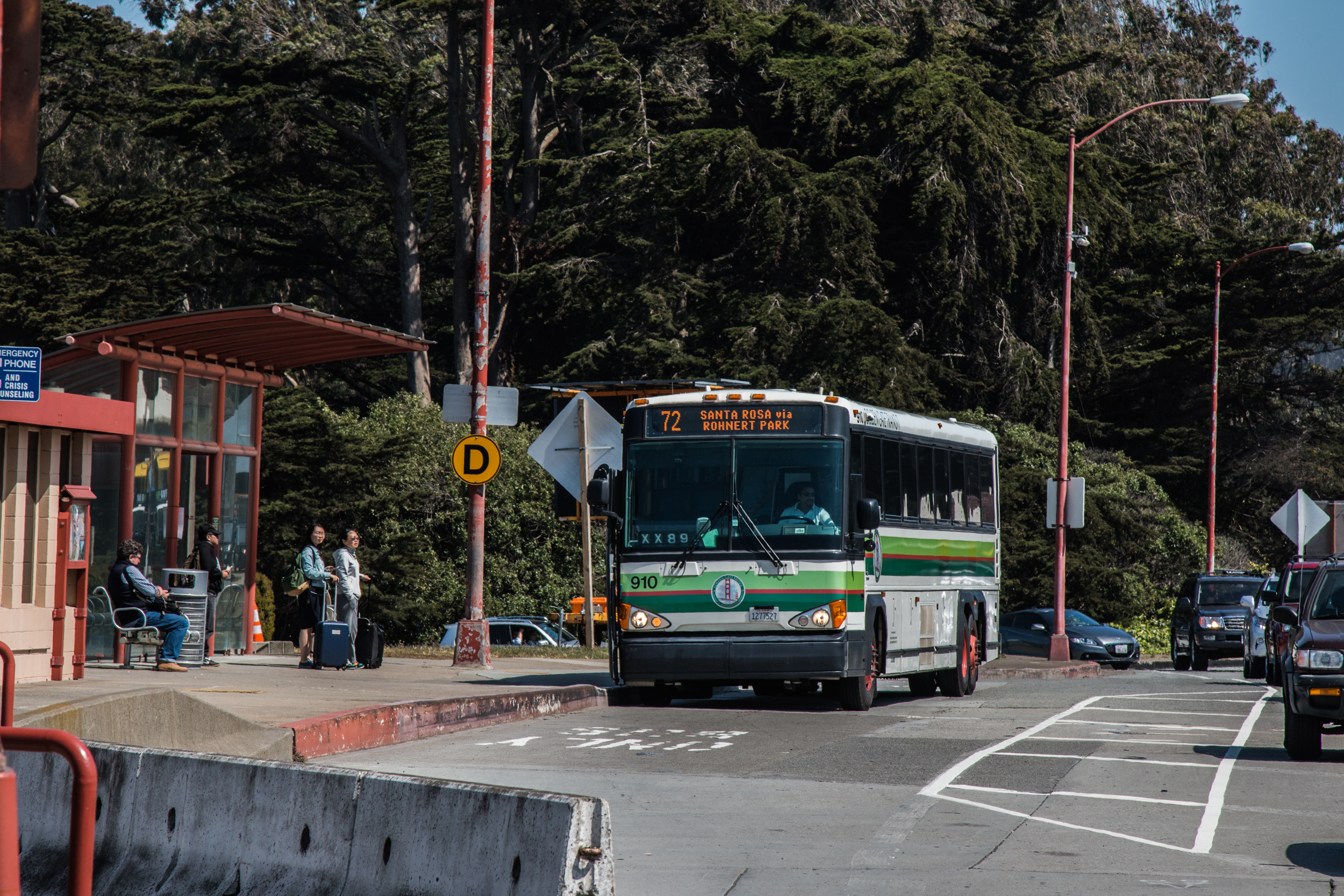
Golden Gate Transit bus at the Golden Gate Bridge toll plaza

Golden Gate Transit has operated mostly suburban-style coaches fitted with high-back seats, overhead luggage bins, and reading lights since its inception. The full fleet has been equipped with wheelchair lifts since 1997 for accessibility. Bike racks were installed on buses beginning in 1999 as part of the Bike Racks on Buses program.

== Fares ==
Golden Gate Transit charges different fares, depending on distance (zones) traveled and method of payment. Fares can be paid with cash or Clipper card. As of July 1, 2025, adult cash fares are as follows:

Zone To/from	San Francisco	Marin County		Sonoma County	East Bay
Zone To/from	1	2 & 3	4	5 & 6	7
1	$5.75	$8.75	$10.00	$14.75	$5.50
2 & 3	$8.75	$2.00		$10.00	$7.50
4	$10.00	$2.00		$8.25	$7.50
5 & 6	$14.75	$10.00	$8.25	$3.00	$13.50
7	$5.50	$7.50		$13.50	$3.00

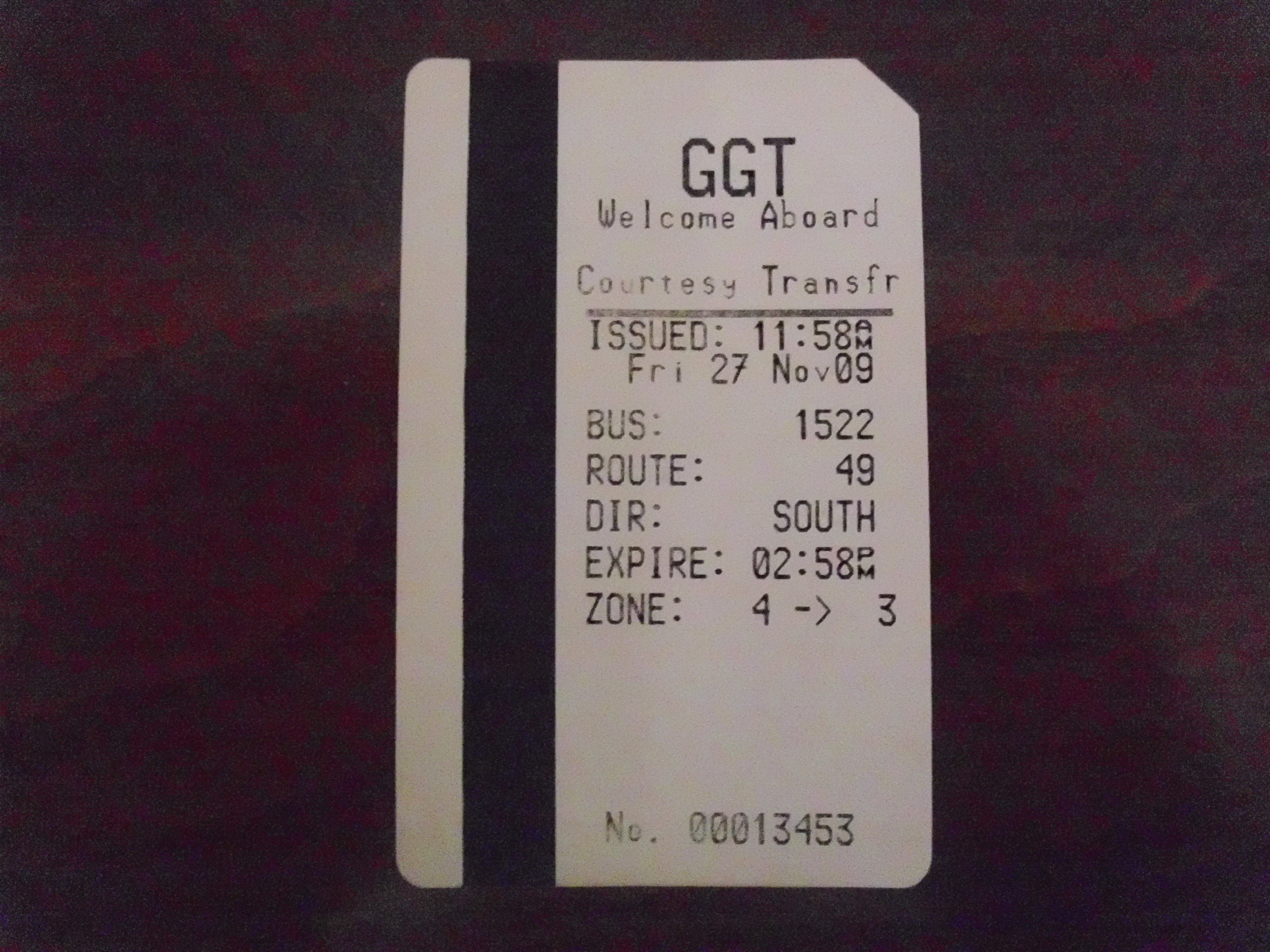
A Golden Gate Transit transfer allowing travel for up to 3 hours.

Adult Clipper fares are discounted 20% for most trips, except within Marin County where the discount is 10% to match Marin Transit fares. A 50% discount is provided to youth (ages 5 through 18), senior (ages 65 and over), disabled, Medicare passengers, and passengers with a Clipper START card. In addition, as a result of a bus service contract with BART, fares for travel between San Francisco and the East Bay match the equivalent BART fares.

Transfers are issued by the farebox upon request at the time of cash fare payment. Clipper automatically tracks transfers. Transfers are valid for two hours for intra-county travel and three hours for inter-county travel and can be used twice. Round-trips are not permitted for inter-county travel. Full transfer privileges are available to/from Marin Transit.

Transfers are issued between GGT and Golden Gate Ferry only for Clipper customers. Transfers are available to/from some connecting transit systems, including AC Transit, Muni, Petaluma Transit, Santa Rosa CityBus, SMART, SolTrans, Sonoma County Transit, and WestCAT. Muni, SMART, and SolTrans transfers are available only to Clipper customers.

Golden Gate Transit accepts one-day and 31-day passes issued by Marin Transit for rides within Marin County. No other pass products are accepted.

== Former services ==
=== Club Bus ===
The Club Bus program was administered by Golden Gate Transit through 2012. It provided commuter clubs with contract support for subscription bus service on routes not otherwise operated. The program also provided a 30% subsidy for the cost of service. The program required the formation of not-for-profit organizations to collect riders' subscription fees and develop schedules.

The Marin Commute Club, which began service in 1971, had direct service from Marin County to three University of California, San Francisco locations (Parnassus Campus, Mission Bay Campus, San Francisco General Hospital) not otherwise served by Golden Gate Transit. Daily ridership dropped from 300 in 1978 to 120 in 2012, and down further to 55 in 2014 shortly before the service was discontinued altogether.

The Valley of the Moon Commute Club provided bus service to the San Francisco Financial District from the Sonoma Valley, which otherwise does not have direct bus service to San Francisco. It was created in 1973 and operated as part of the Club Bus program until 2011. At its peak, the club had service on five buses. However, the economic downturn and changing travel patterns resulted in substantial service reductions and fare hikes. By late 2010, service had been cut to one round-trip with a monthly subscription fee of $350. In February 2011, with the club on the brink of shutting down, service was transferred to a private tour company. Due to further ridership declines, service was discontinued in May 2014.

== See also ==
- Golden Gate Ferry
- Marin Transit
- Van Ness Bus Rapid Transit
