= Girdwood station =

Girdwood station may refer to:

- A flag stop on the Sudbury-White River train, Ontario, Canada
- Girdwood Depot, Alaska, US
