= Nippon Sharyo DMU =

Diesel multiple unit passenger train model

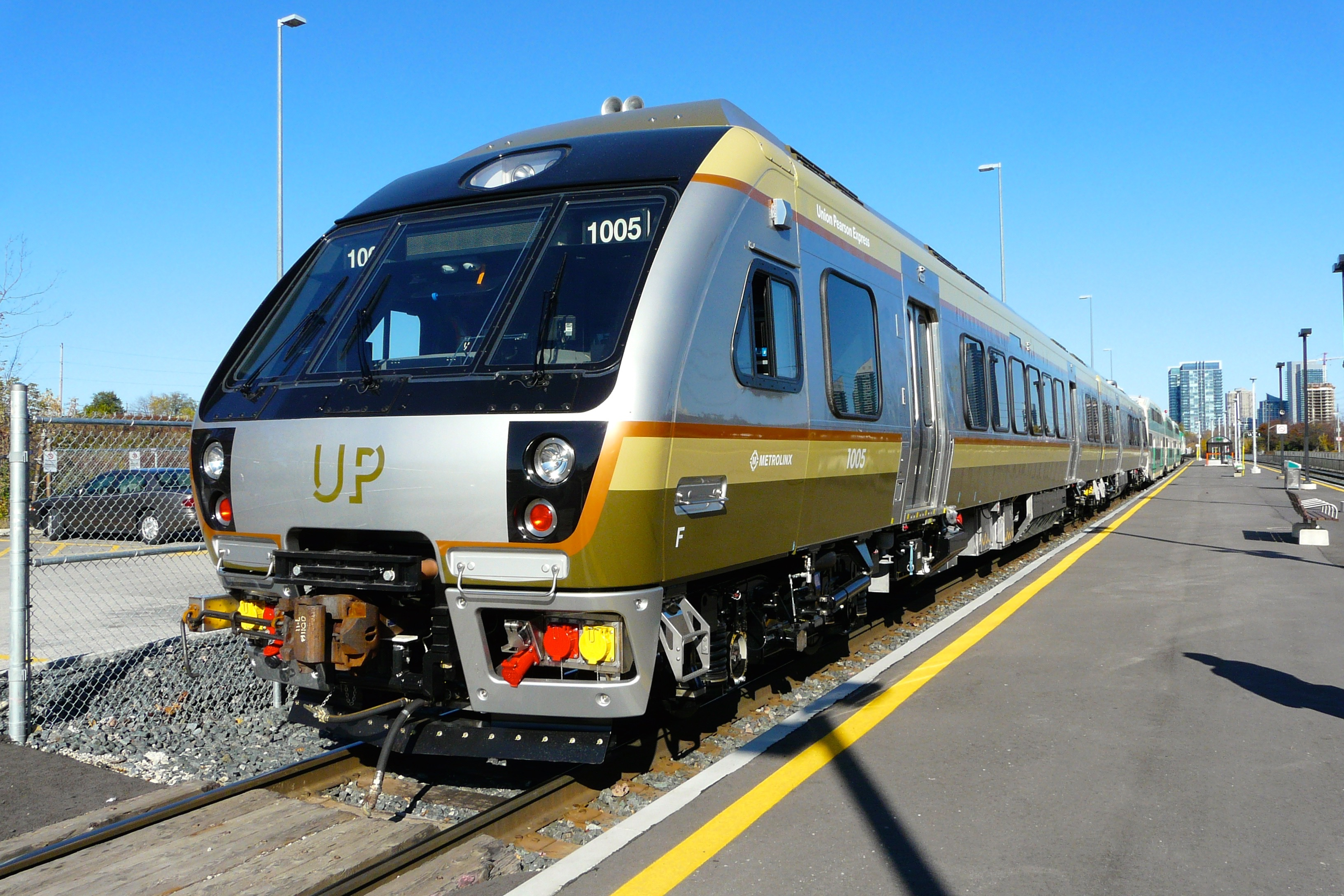
- Nippon Sharyo DMU of Union Pearson Express

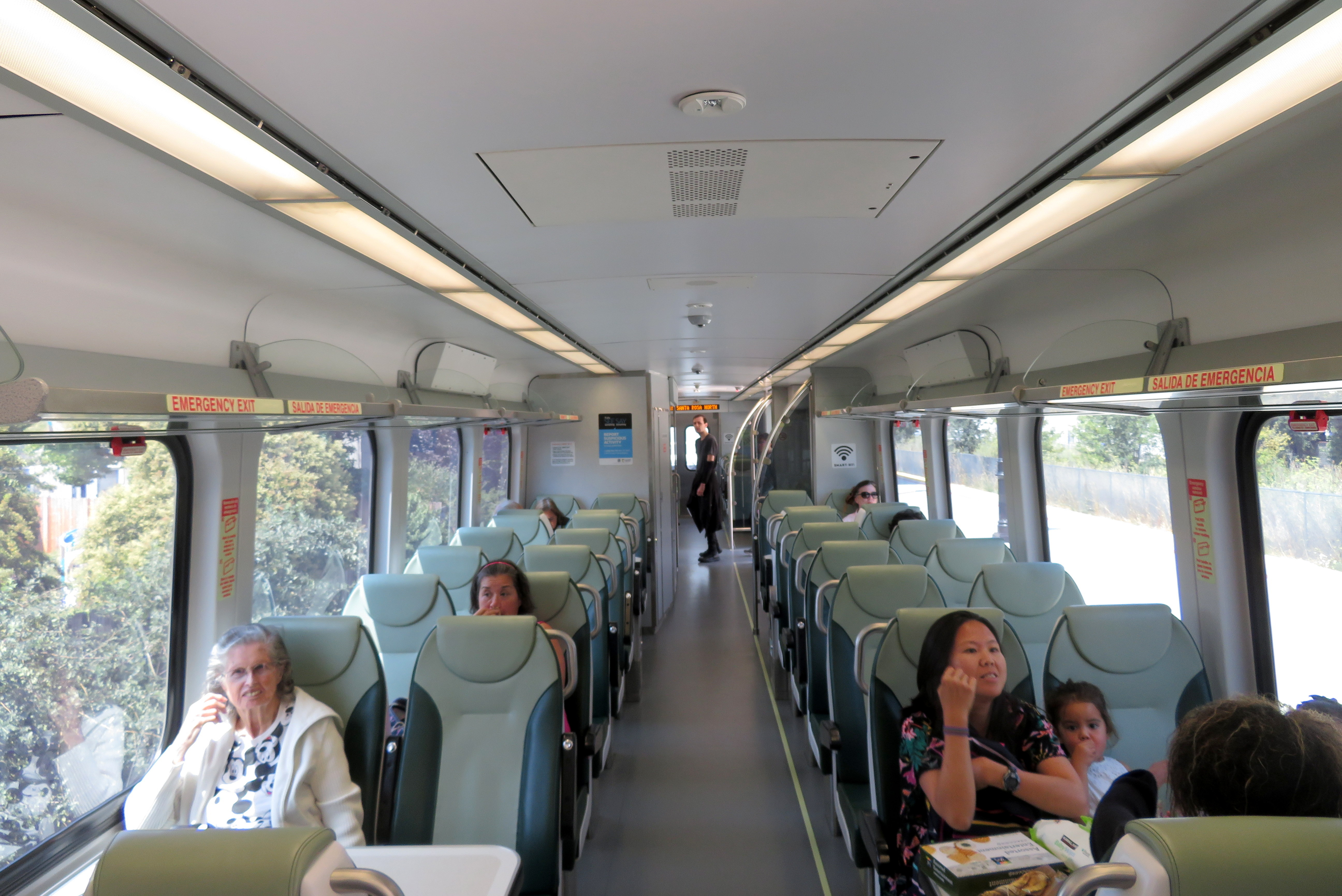
- Interior of a SMART train
- Stock type: Diesel multiple unit
- Manufacturers: Nippon Sharyo; Nagoya, Japan
- Assembly: Nippon Sharyo; Rochelle, Illinois, United States; Nagoya, Japan
- Constructed: 2013–2018
- Entered service: 2015; 11 years ago
- Number built: SMART: 18 (9 A & 9 B); UP Express: 18 (14 A & 4 C)
- Capacity: 79 seated 80 standing

Specifications
- Car length: 85 ft (25.91 m)
- Platform height: 48 in (1,220 mm)
- Entry: Level
- Maximum speed: UPX: 90 mph (145 km/h); SMART: 79 mph (127 km/h)
- Prime mover: Cummins QSK19-R
- Power output: 760 hp (570 kW)
- Transmission: Hydraulic
- Acceleration: 0.78 mph/s (1.26 km/(h⋅s))
- Deceleration: 2.1 mph/s (3.4 km/(h⋅s)) (service); 2.8 mph/s (4.5 km/(h⋅s)) (emergency)
- AAR wheel arrangement: 2-B
- Braking system: Regenerative
- Safety system: FRA Tier 1 compliant
- Coupling system: Type H
- Track gauge: 4 ft 8 1/2 in (1,435 mm) standard gauge

The Nippon Sharyo DMU is a model of diesel multiple unit passenger train designed and manufactured by Nippon Sharyo for the North American market, and compliant with FRA Tier 1 crashworthiness standards. It is operated by Sonoma–Marin Area Rail Transit (SMART) in Sonoma and Marin Counties, California, and by Metrolinx for the Union Pearson Express airport link in Toronto, Ontario.

== Design ==
Each Nippon Sharyo DMU is powered by one Cummins QSK19-R diesel engine with hydraulic transmission and regenerative braking, and meets US EPA Tier 4 emission standards. Structurally each DMU is FRA Tier 1 compliant with crash energy management features, making it capable of operating on the same line with standard North American freight trains without the need of special waivers. Braking energy is converted into electricity by the auxiliary power generator, and helps to provide on-board lighting and heating.

The DMU is offered in three variants that shared the same mechanical design:

- A-car: one aerodynamic gangwayless end with full-width cab, one flat non-cab end with gangway, equipped with one ADA-compliant bathroom
- B-car: similar to A-car but with service bar instead of bathroom
- C-car: similar to A-car but the aerodynamic end was replaced with a flat end with gangway and cab, so it can be run either as a middle car or an end car of a train

The vehicles are designed to be convertible to electric multiple unit operation.

== Operators ==
=== Overview ===
Operator	Numbers	Model	Quantity	Notes
SMART	101-118	A/B-car	18	First 14 units delivered by 2015. Last 4 delivered in 2018.
UPX	1001-1012; 3001-3004	A-car; C-car	18	Only C-car operator.

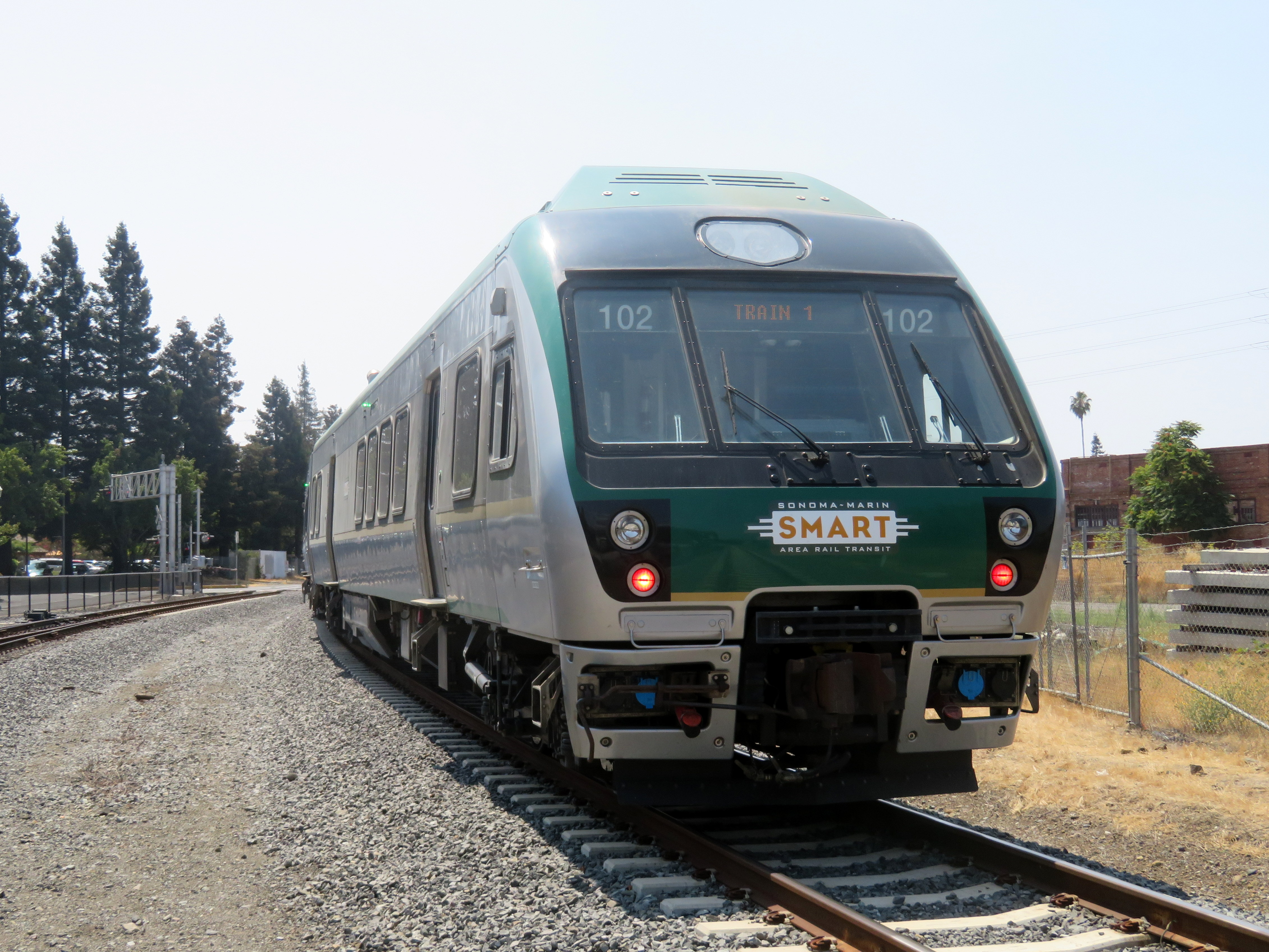
Nippon Sharyo DMU of SMART

=== Sonoma Marin Area Rail Transit ===
Sonoma–Marin Area Rail Transit (SMART) ordered 14 cars in December 2010. Half of the cars were ordered as A-car and the remaining as B-car.

In June 2015 SMART received a grant from California State Transportation Agency (CalSTA) to purchase 3 C-cars. These would have allowed SMART to use 3 train sets with a third car in the middle. In April 2016, SMART's general manager negotiated with CalSTA and Nippon Sharyo to adjust the order so SMART will receive 2 more full train sets bringing their fleet size to the required 9 (18 cars) needed for service to Cloverdale.

The first cars, numbered 101 and 102, were delivered to SMART in April 2015. The final cars from the original order, numbered 113 and 114, arrived in December 2015. The four additional cars, numbered 115 through 118 and assembled in Japan, were delivered to SMART in October 2018.

=== Union Pearson Express ===
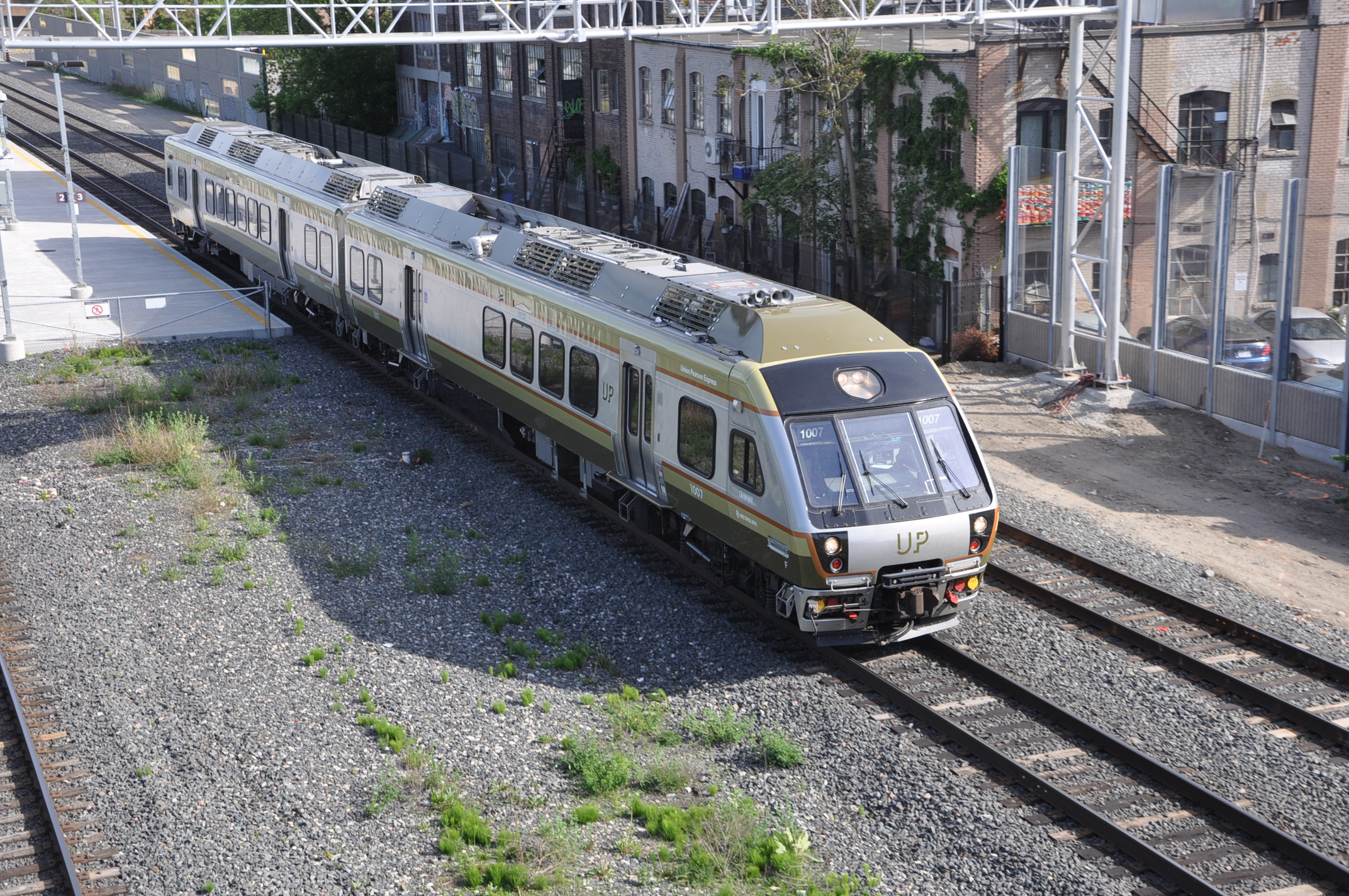
A UP Express Nippon Sharyo two-car DMU in service

Seven trains comprise the fleet of Union Pearson Express (UP Express), grouped into 4 three-car and 3 two-car train sets (for a total of 18 cars). Union Pearson Express units feature enclosed overhead luggage bins as required by Transport Canada, and an enhanced enclosed luggage tower.

The first cars were delivered to Metrolinx in August 2014. All 18 cars ordered (12 A-car & 6 C-car) were delivered and entered service by June 2015.

=== Canceled procurements ===
TriMet considered ordering a two-car train for its WES Commuter Rail to supplement its fleet of Colorado Railcar DMUs; however, this procurement was canceled when an agreement could not be met with the manufacturer on a price. The Indigo Line, a proposed MBTA urban rail transit service that has since been indefinitely postponed, originally planned to use DMUs as rolling stock in 2014; this procurement was canceled in 2016.

== Incidents and accidents ==
A July 2016 fire aboard one of UP Express's units revealed a design flaw in the Cummins engine's crankshaft that would severely shorten engine life if not corrected. While Cummins advised that correcting the design flaw could be deferred until engines' mid-life overhaul, SMART chose to have the crankshaft replaced before the service start, as it was also facing delays caused by grade-crossing warning issue and PTC certification. All SMART units had the crankshaft issue corrected before the service started in spring 2017.

In November 2018, four cars were damaged during shipping in a freight collision while en route to SMART. The agency did not accept the cars as delivered, and Nippon Sharyo dispatched a team to California to assess the damage and plan for repairs.

== See also ==
- Budd Rail Diesel Car
- Stadler GTW
- Colorado Railcar DMU
