= Sonoma–Marin Area Rail Transit =

Commuter rail in California, US

- A SMART train at Santa Rosa Downtown station in 2018

Overview
- Owner: Sonoma–Marin Area Rail Transit District
- Locale: Sonoma and Marin counties
- Termini: Windsor; Larkspur
- Stations: 14 (+2 planned)
- Website: sonomamarintrain.org

Service
- Type: Commuter rail
- Depot: SMART Rail Operations Center
- Rolling stock: 18 × Nippon Sharyo DMU
- Daily ridership: 5,200 (weekdays, Q2 2026)
- Ridership: 1,329,300 (2025)

History
- Work began: 2012
- Opened: June 29, 2017 (preview service); August 25, 2017 (full service)
- Last extension: May 31, 2025

Technical
- Line length: 48 mi (77 km) (operational); 70 mi (110 km) (mandated)
- Number of tracks: Single (85%) with passing sidings
- Track gauge: 4 ft 8 1/2 in (1,435 mm) standard gauge
- Operating speed: 34.1 mph (54.9 km/h) (avg.); 79 mph (127 km/h) (top)
Route map
Sonoma–Marin Area Rail Transit highlighted in green

Sonoma–Marin Area Rail Transit (SMART; reporting mark SMAR) is a commuter rail service and bicycle–pedestrian pathway project in Sonoma and Marin counties of the U.S. state of California. When fully built, the system will span a 70-mile (110 km) corridor between Cloverdale in northern Sonoma County and Larkspur Landing in Marin County. In 2025, SMART recorded an annual ridership of 1,329,300, averaging about 5,200 weekday passengers as of the second quarter of 2026.

The segment between Rohnert Park and Marin Civic Center opened for preview and excursion service on June 29, 2017. The full 43-mile (69 km) first phase, running between Sonoma County Airport and San Rafael, began regular service on August 25, 2017, following Federal Railroad Administration approval of the line's positive train control system. Service was extended two miles (3.2 km) south to Larkspur on December 14, 2019, and three miles (4.8 km) north to Windsor station on May 31, 2025. A nine-mile (14 km) extension to Healdsburg is under construction, with completion expected in 2028, while the final extension north to Cloverdale remains planned but unfunded.

The district is funded primarily by Measure Q, a quarter-cent sales tax approved by voters in November 2008 that expires in 2029. Revenue fell short of projections during the Great Recession, requiring phased construction. A 30-year extension of the tax was approved in 2026.

== History ==
=== Background and formation ===
The last passenger rail service along the Northwestern Pacific Railroad south of Willits was discontinued in 1958 as automobile travel along U.S. Route 101 in California increased in popularity.

The SMART District was formally established by state legislation (Assembly Bill 2224) in 2002, which mandated the district's creation and established its governance structure across the two counties. Previously disused station buildings were repaired in anticipation of reestablished rail service in Healdsburg and Windsor, and Cloverdale's depot was constructed in 1998.

=== Environmental impact report ===
Mitigation of environmental impacts was studied and summarized in a report issued in June 2006. The recommended remedies, which were certified without challenge, included the establishment of quiet zones to restrict routine train horn use at grade crossings, and the replacement of specific wetland ditches.

On October 10, 2013, SMART announced that it had obtained more than 56 acres (23 ha) of an area in Novato known as the "Mira Monte Marina." The purchase was executed to restore the area and preserve tidal wetlands, specifically mitigating 2.2 acres (0.89 ha) of project impacts determined through the environmental review process and providing a land bank for future construction phases.

=== Funding ===
The project is funded by federal, state, regional, and local allocations, including bridge tolls, dedicated sales tax revenues, and fares. The capital cost of track rehabilitation for the full 70-mile (110 km) line, signals, and railcars was originally estimated to be about $450 million in 2008 ($673 million adjusted for inflation). By 2019, development of the line from Airport Boulevard in Santa Rosa to the San Rafael Transit Center had consumed $448 million, and the estimated cost to complete the legislated system had increased to $944 million.

In November 2006, Measure R, a proposal for funding through an increase in sales taxes, received a combined 65.3% "yes" vote in the two-county District (70.1% in Sonoma County and 57.5% in Marin County). The measure failed because it lacked the two-thirds supermajority required for passage.

Measure Q, a similar proposal, was approved on November 4, 2008, receiving a combined vote of 69.5% (73.5% in Sonoma County and 62.6% in Marin County). It provided project funding through a quarter-cent sales tax in both counties set to expire in 2029. The Great Recession severely reduced the tax base, forcing the agency to build the project in phases; the tax was projected to generate $890 million over its lifetime, but the first decade yielded only $289 million. By fiscal year 2024, Measure Q generated $48.8 million in annual sales tax revenue.

In March 2020, SMART proposed Measure I to extend the quarter-cent sales tax for thirty years past its 2029 expiration. The measure received 51.2% of combined votes district-wide (49.8% in Sonoma County, 53.5% in Marin County), falling short of the two-thirds supermajority threshold by approximately fifteen percentage points; the campaign cost exceeded $3 million, the most expensive North Bay ballot measure to that date.

A citizen-led initiative campaign collected approximately 57,418 validated signatures across both counties to qualify a 30-year sales tax extension for the June 2, 2026, primary election ballot. Under a 2024 change to California law, the measure requires only a simple majority for passage because it qualified through voter initiative rather than board referral. Ahead of the vote, opponents including developer Bill Gallaher funded a book characterizing SMART as a "taxpayer ripoff" and "failed experiment". On June 2, 2026, the sales tax extension, titled Measure B, passed with 74.59% of the vote.

The SMART board authorized the sale of bonds in late 2011; proceeds were placed into an escrow account until an effort by a local taxpayer group to repeal the sales tax was legally resolved. In May 2012, SMART issued nearly $200 million in bonds to fund the immediate construction of the IOS, with debt service backed by the Measure Q quarter-cent sales tax revenue.

=== Initial operating segment track rehabilitation ===
In January 2012, SMART completed negotiations to rebuild the 43-mile (69 km) Initial Operating Segment (IOS) between Airport Blvd in Santa Rosa and the Civic Center Station in San Rafael under the original budget estimate. The segment was completed jointly by Stacy Witbeck and Herzog. In 2012, SMART added two stations to the IOS design: north Santa Rosa, near Coddingtown, and Novato at Atherton Avenue.

The Puerto Suello Hill Tunnel in San Rafael was structurally rehabilitated for passenger service, and the 111-year-old fixed span Haystack Bridge over the Petaluma River was replaced with a movable bascule bridge. Concrete ties were installed along the line to support track speeds up to 80 miles per hour (130 km/h), and several legacy freight spur lines were removed to adhere to federal safety standards. Businesses can reconnect a switch and spur to the line for approximately $300,000.

The first phase of construction did not include the continuous parallel pedestrian and bicycle path originally envisioned, prioritizing rail infrastructure over the trail network to stay within budget.

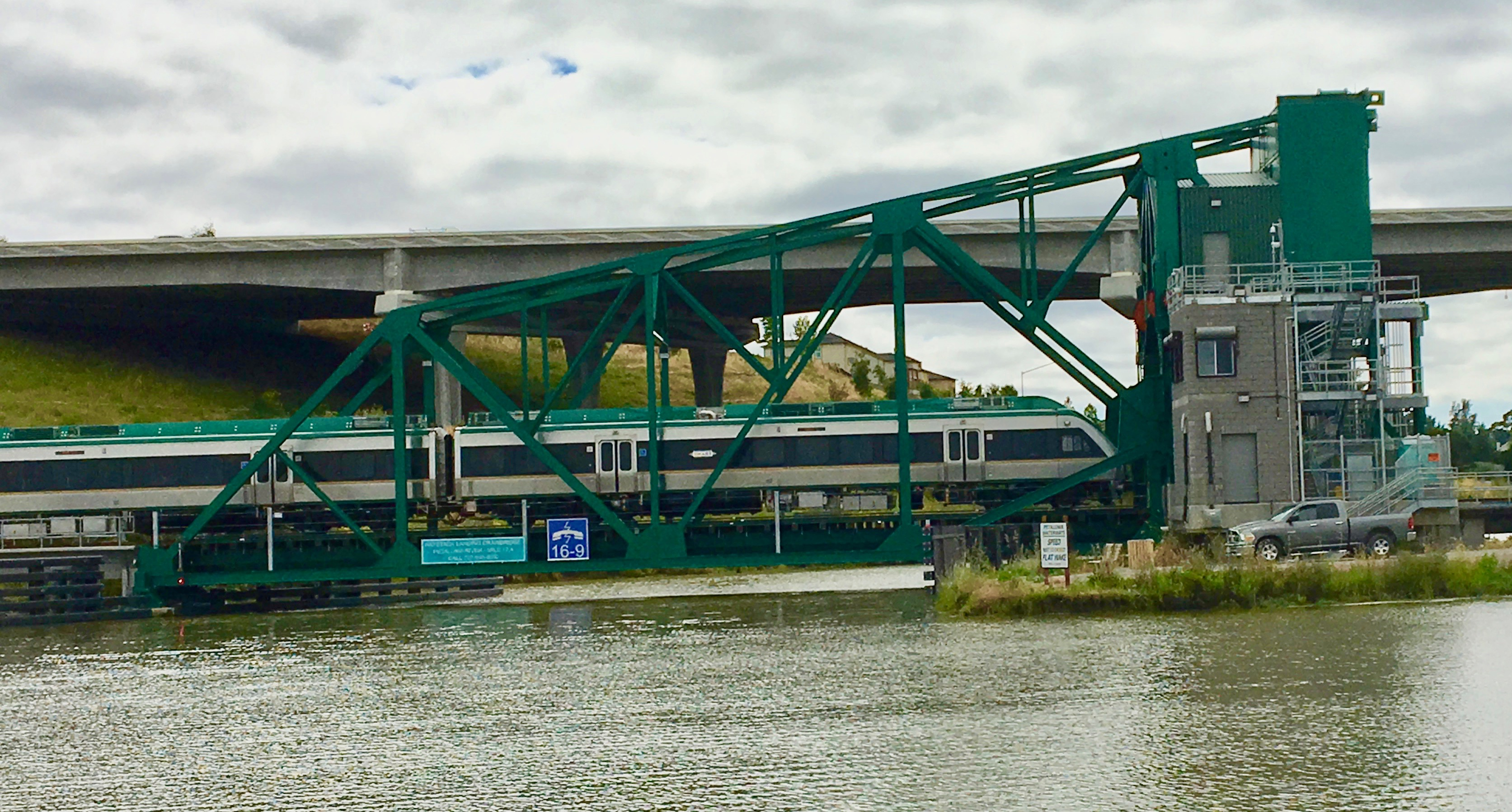
A northbound SMART train crosses the Petaluma River on a drawbridge previously used on the Galveston Causeway in Texas. Note US 101 on the taller bridge in the background.

=== Delayed start of service ===
Scheduled passenger service was originally planned for 2014, but was delayed to late 2016 due to funding shortages tied to the economic downturn.

In late 2016, the agency delayed opening the IOS to "late spring 2017." The primary cause was a design flaw discovered in July 2016 when a near-identical Nippon Sharyo train operating on Toronto's Union Pearson Express experienced an engine fire. The issue was traced to a flaw in the Cummins QSK19-R engine's crankshaft that caused premature wear. SMART preemptively recalled all of its vehicles to its Rail Operations Center to rebuild the engines and replace the crankshafts prior to entering revenue service. Concurrently, the agency experienced problems with warning systems at some grade crossings and had not completed its positive train control approval process with the Federal Railroad Administration. The 2017 California floods also caused landslide damage near the Puerto Suello Hill Tunnel, further delaying physical testing of the line.

Preview service and excursion trips timed with the Marin County Fair began on June 29, 2017, offering free fares as far south as Marin Civic Center. Full revenue service commenced on August 25, 2017.

=== Larkspur segment ===
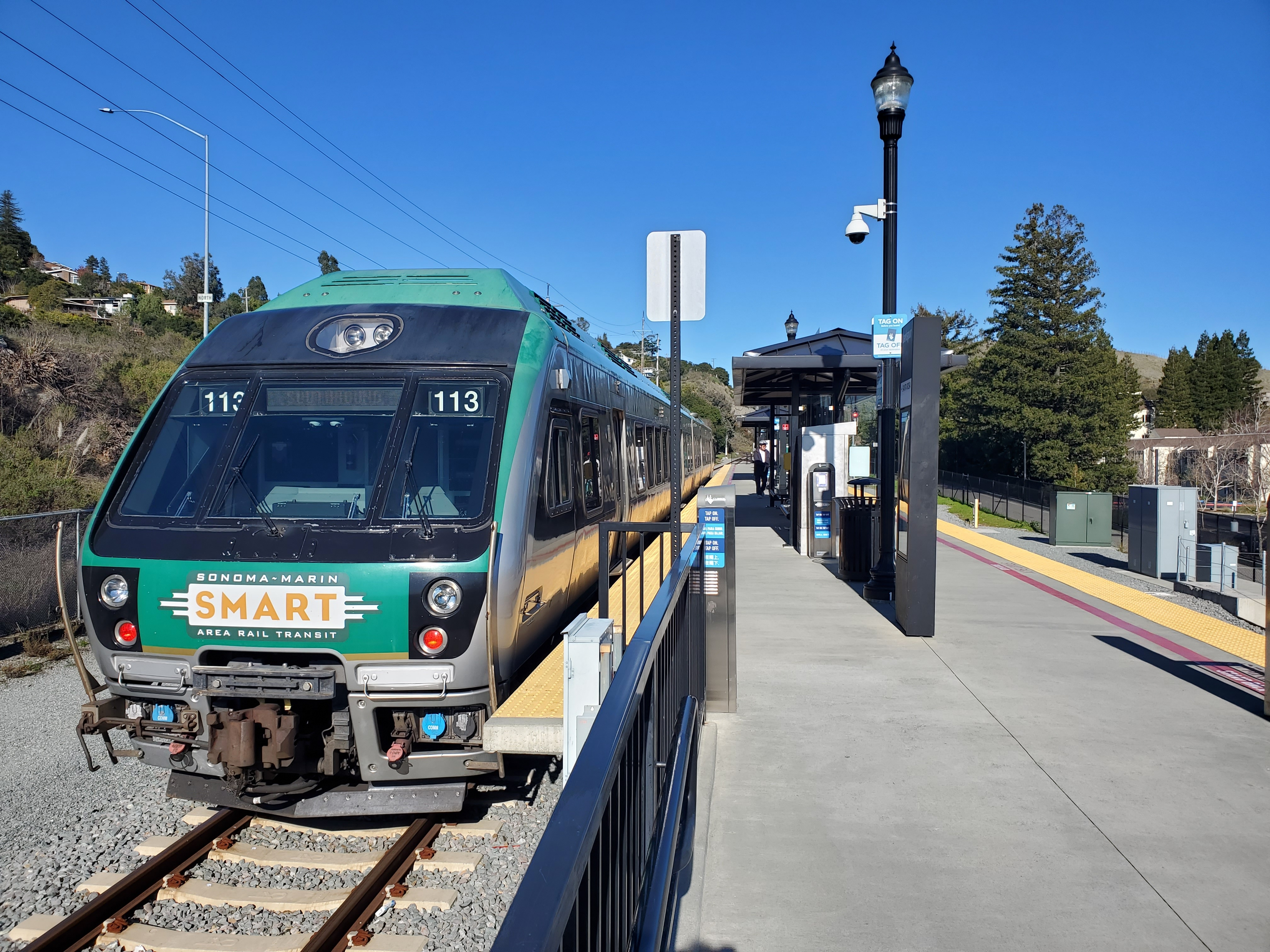
A SMART train at Larkspur station, January 2025

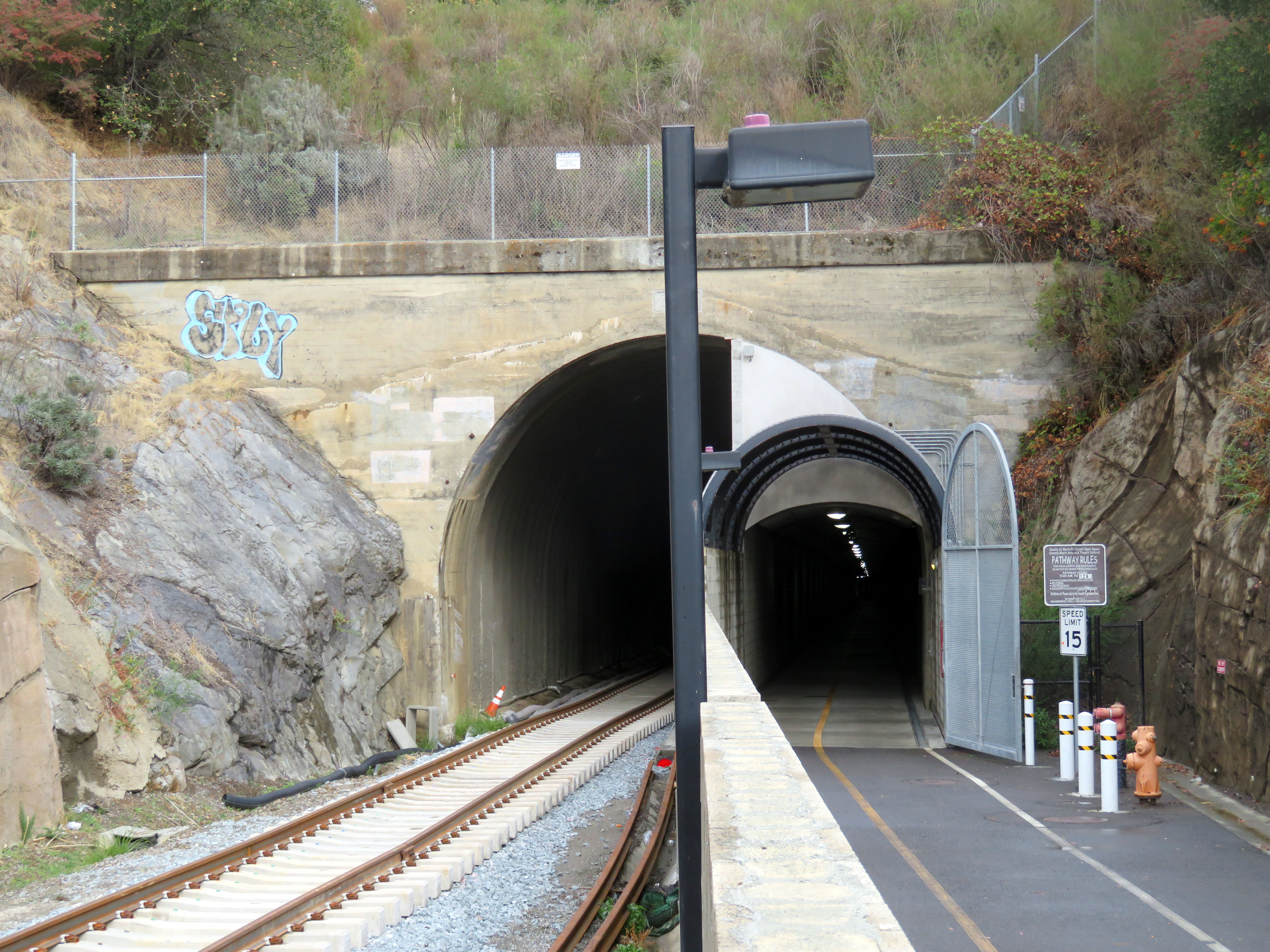
South portal of Cal Park Hill Tunnel showing rails and path, November 2018

San Rafael bore costs estimated at $6 million (2012) for the Andersen Drive crossing of the Larkspur to San Rafael segment. The street was extended in the mid-1990s to cross the tracks on a temporary road. In July 1997, the California Public Utilities Commission required the city to fund the crossing's restoration prior to SMART operations.

In 2010, the agency received a federal earmark of $2.5 million for technical, environmental, and engineering design on the segment. Later that year, the rehabilitated California Park Tunnel (30 feet (9.1 m) wide, 25 feet (7.6 m) tall, and 1,100 feet (340 m) long) opened to pedestrian traffic. The $28 million renovation was funded equally by Marin County and SMART. The tunnel accommodates both the rail right-of-way and a bicycle/pedestrian path.

In May 2013, the SMART board approved the San Rafael to Larkspur link as its preferred alternative. On September 24, 2013, SMART was accepted into the Federal Transit Administration's "Small Starts" program. The FY2016 federal budget included construction funds for the Larkspur Extension. Construction contracts were awarded to a joint venture of Stacy Witbeck and Herzog for $36.3 million. Work commenced in late 2017. In April 2018, SMART was awarded a $22.5 million federal grant for the extension. Final costs totaled an estimated $55.4 million. System testing began in August 2019 and concluded by late October. Revenue service commenced on December 14, 2019.

The Novato Downtown station, partially built during the IOS construction phase, officially opened alongside the Larkspur extension.

=== 2019 service disruptions ===
Service was cancelled on October 28 and 29, 2019, due to preemptive utility power shutoffs affecting the grade crossing signal infrastructure. Partial service to Downtown Santa Rosa was restored on October 30, and full service returned the following day with free rides offered through November 6, serving residents impacted by the Kincade Fire.

During weekends in November 2019, service gaps occurred between Petaluma and Novato–Hamilton to accommodate testing for the Downtown Novato station. A bus bridge operated with transfers at San Marin.

=== 2020–22 operational changes ===
During the COVID-19 pandemic, SMART reduced its schedule to 8 weekday round trips with no weekend service. In May 2021, service increased to 13 weekday and 6 Saturday round trips. Backed by $3.2 million in federal stimulus funds, the agency restored pre-pandemic schedules in 2022.

In May 2020, SMART acquired control of freight operations from the Northwestern Pacific Railroad. The state funded the $4 million purchase of rolling stock, track rights, and related properties. The agency took full ownership of freight operations and 21 miles (34 km) of trackage north of Healdsburg in July 2021. Sunday service resumed on May 1, 2022.

=== North of Santa Rosa ===
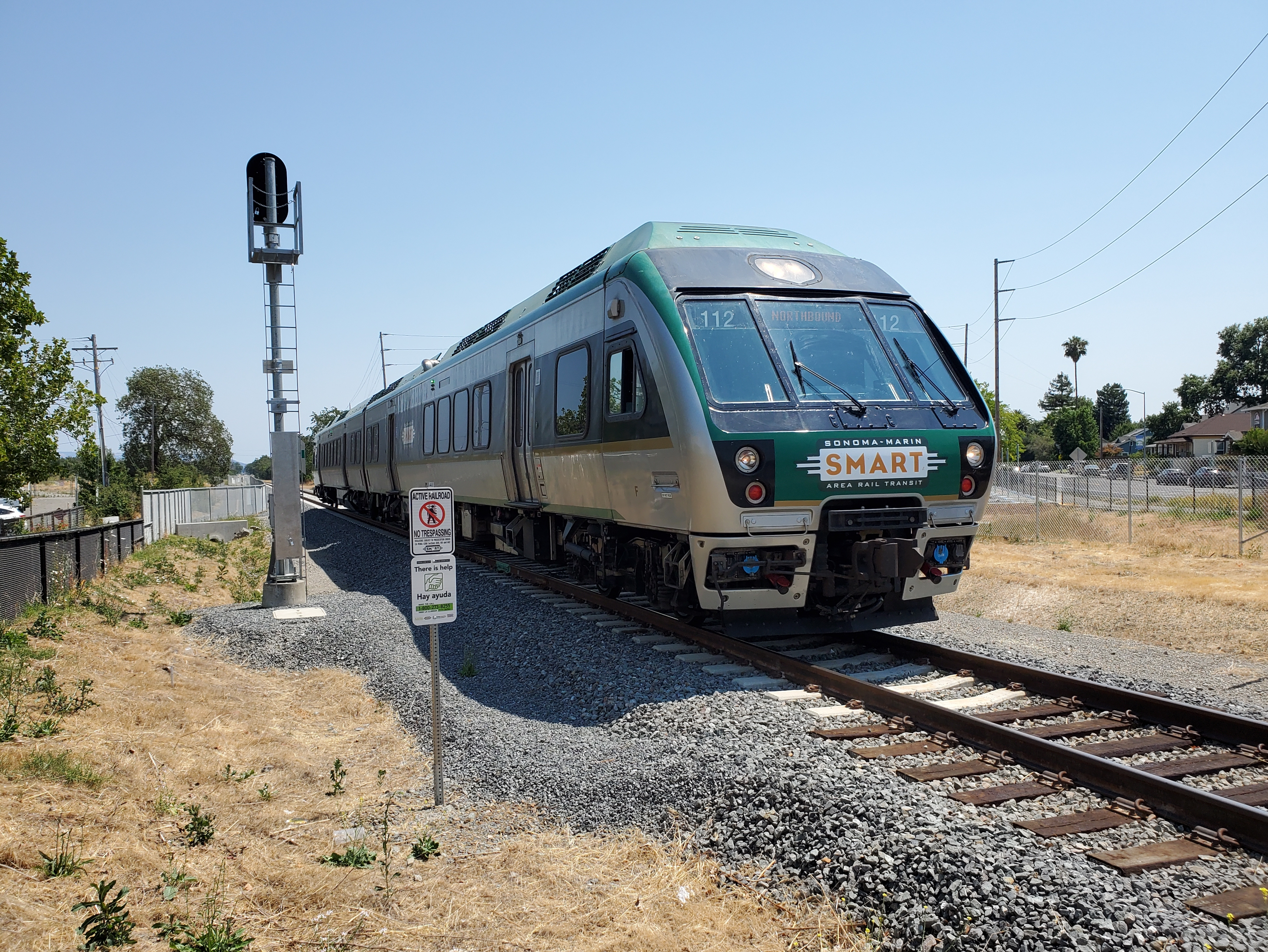
A SMART train approaching Windsor station in July 2025, shortly after the station opened

In 2018, the 3-mile (4.8 km) extension to Windsor was expected to cost $55 million, sourced from Road Repair and Accountability Act funds, Regional Measure 3 funds, and a federal grant. By November 2019, the estimate rose to $65 million.

The segment from Santa Rosa to Cloverdale was initially intended for the first phase but was delayed due to funding constraints. By May 2019, the estimated cost to reach Cloverdale and Healdsburg was $364 million. A 2020 study estimated the cost of reconstructing the Russian River bridge and the Healdsburg station at $32 million.

Work on the Windsor extension was temporarily suspended in 2021 pending the outcome of a regional toll lawsuit. A lawsuit dismissal in January 2023 freed $40 million for the agency, followed by a $34 million state grant. On July 5, 2023, the California Transportation Commission awarded SMART a $30 million grant to fund the Windsor and Healdsburg extensions. The extension includes trackage running 3.3 miles (5.3 km) north of Healdsburg station to the city limits.

Windsor station opened on May 31, 2025. As part of a 2025–26 Metropolitan Transportation Commission regional coordination effort, local transit providers including Marin Transit, Petaluma Transit, Santa Rosa CityBus, and Sonoma County Transit restructured bus service to connect with SMART stations rather than parallel the rail corridor. Service changes on April 12, 2026, increased SMART service to 24 weekday round trips and 12 weekend round trips; bus schedules also changed at that time.

In September 2023, SMART received a $32 million federal Consolidated Rail Infrastructure and Safety Improvements (CRISI) grant, including $28 million for positive train control installation on the Windsor–Healdsburg segment and $4 million for Tier IV freight locomotives. In October 2024, the California Transportation Commission awarded SMART an additional $81 million through the Transit and Intercity Rail Capital Program and Solutions for Congested Corridors Program for the Windsor–Healdsburg extension, matched by $187.7 million in other funds. Construction on the nine-mile Windsor–Healdsburg extension broke ground in March 2026, with a $21.7 million contract awarded to a Stacy Witbeck–Herzog joint venture; total project cost was estimated at $269 million.

In August 2026, the SMART board approved a station in Geyserville.

=== Proposed expansion ===
Additional infill stations are proposed for Santa Rosa and Fulton.

SMART has studied an extension along its freight tracks between Ignacio and Schellville into Napa or Solano counties, which would connect to the Vallejo ferry or the Amtrak station in Suisun City. Estimated at $1 billion as of 2019, the project requires a new funding mechanism (Napa and Solano are not member counties of the SMART District) and is not projected to begin before 2040. Other proposals include extending service north to Ukiah or Willits and an East Bay expansion over a rebuilt Richmond–San Rafael Bridge, listed as a finalist in the Metropolitan Transportation Commission's Plan Bay Area 2050.

== System details ==
=== Rail corridor and freight ===
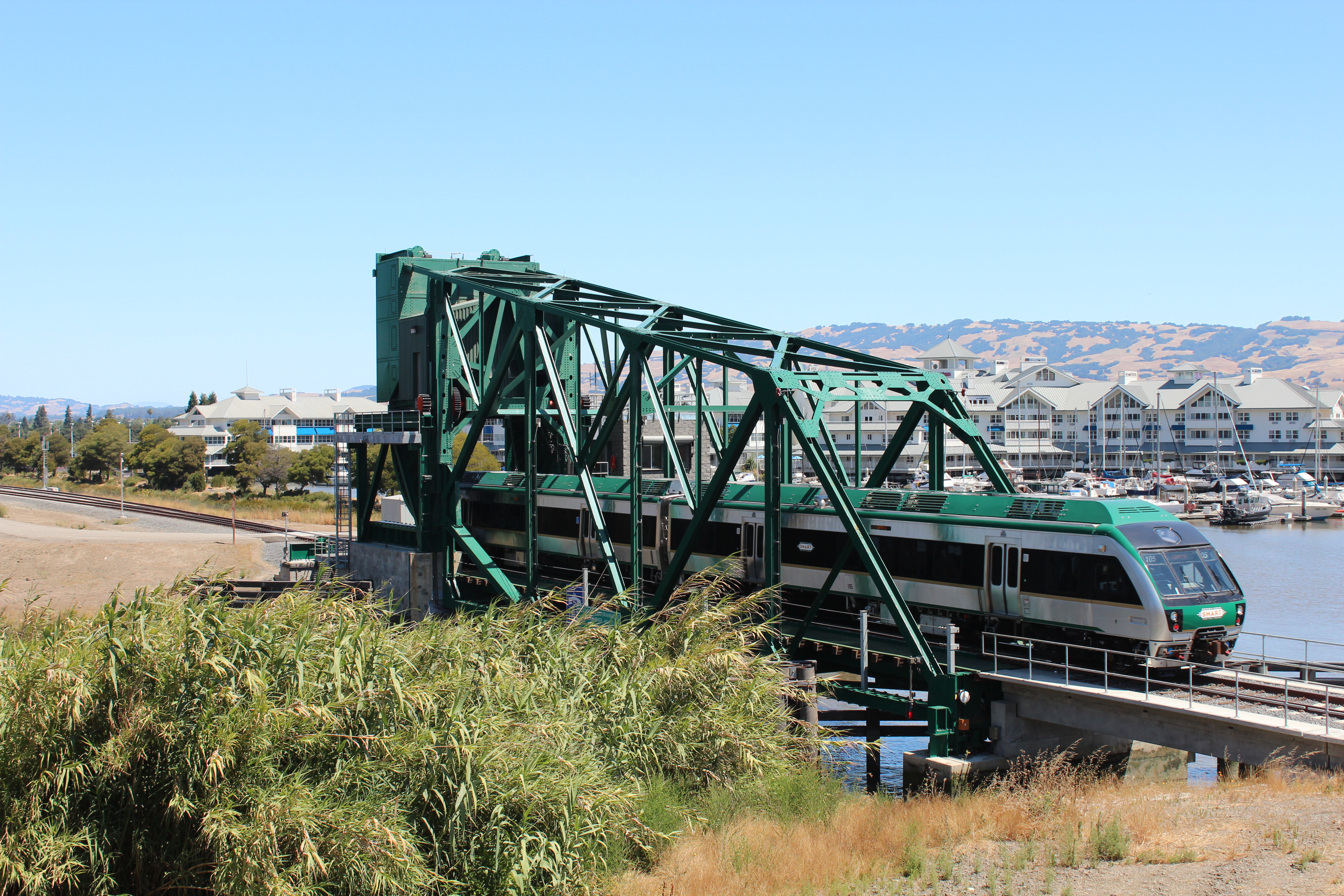
A SMART train crossing the Haystack Landing bridge

The SMART District operates on the historic Northwestern Pacific Railroad right-of-way, which roughly parallels U.S. Highway 101. The segment from San Rafael to Santa Rosa includes 24 bridges and 63 at-grade crossings. A positive train control system was implemented to meet FRA mandates for passenger services with grade crossings. SMART's system, designated Enhanced Automatic Train Control (E-ATC), was designed, furnished, installed, tested, and commissioned by Modern Railway Systems (MRS). The initial operating segment implementation covered 24 control points, 29 new grade-crossing warning systems, 15 onboard train control sets, and upgrades to 34 existing crossing warning systems, with a fiber optic communications backbone running the full corridor. General Manager Farhad Mansourian stated the agency spent approximately $50 million over four years developing the system. SMART operated under Federal Railroad Administration Revenue Service Demonstration status before receiving full PTC certification, announced January 5, 2021, ahead of the industry-wide December 31, 2020, deadline.

Approximately 85% of the mainline is single-track with passing sidings. Writing in the Marin Independent Journal, Mike Arnold argued that the single-track design constrains minimum headways and requires trains to adhere strictly to schedule to cross at sidings.

The corridor is also utilized for freight. The North Coast Railroad Authority (NCRA) and NWP Co provided freight service until SMART absorbed NWP operations in 2020. In February 2021, the Surface Transportation Board approved SMART's notice of exemption to acquire 88 miles (142 km) of right-of-way from NCRA; SMART officially became the freight common carrier in July 2021, though NWPCo. continued operating the line until the acquisition formally closed on February 28, 2022. Freight operations began March 1, 2022, through interim contractor Summit Signal; SMART assumed direct operations on July 1, 2022, interchanging with the California Northern Railroad. As of 2024, freight service operates two round-trip trains per week, exclusively during overnight hours when passenger trains are not running, totaling approximately 5,876 freight train miles per year, about 1% of SMART's combined passenger and freight operations. In 2021, the agency secured a grant to upgrade freight infrastructure, including new sidings and repairs to the Black Point Rail Bridge over the Petaluma River.

=== Stations ===
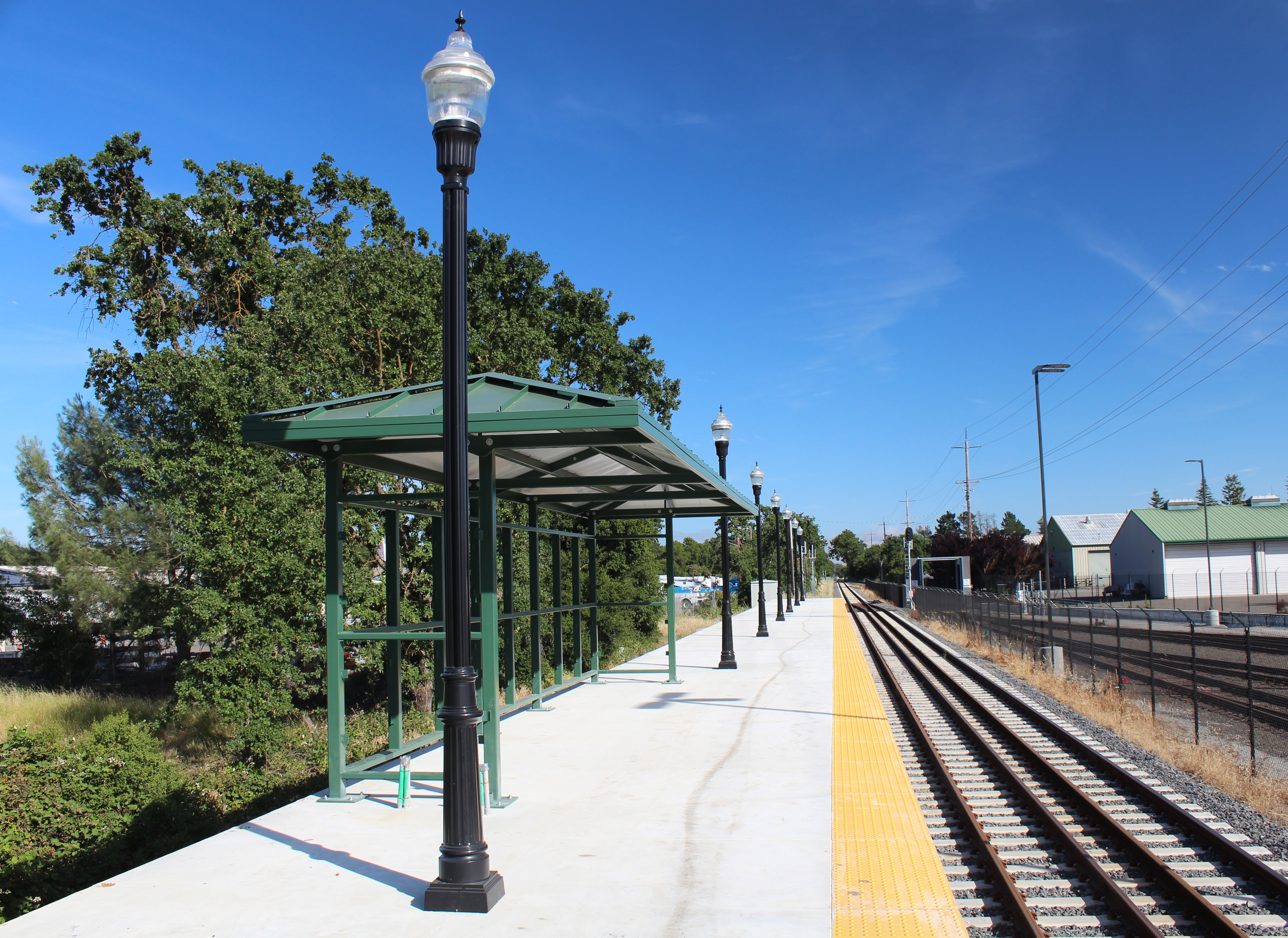
The station at Sonoma County Airport

All stops feature newly constructed 48-inch (1,200 mm) high-floor platforms to provide level boarding and ADA compliance. North of the Ignacio freight interchange, stations use a gauntlet track to permit freight passage while keeping the passenger platform edge tight to the DMUs. Stations generally include a small shelter, seating, light poles, signage, and waste receptacles.

Original plans outlined ten stations in the IOS and five in a second phase. The downtown Novato station was added late in the IOS construction and opened concurrently with the Larkspur extension.

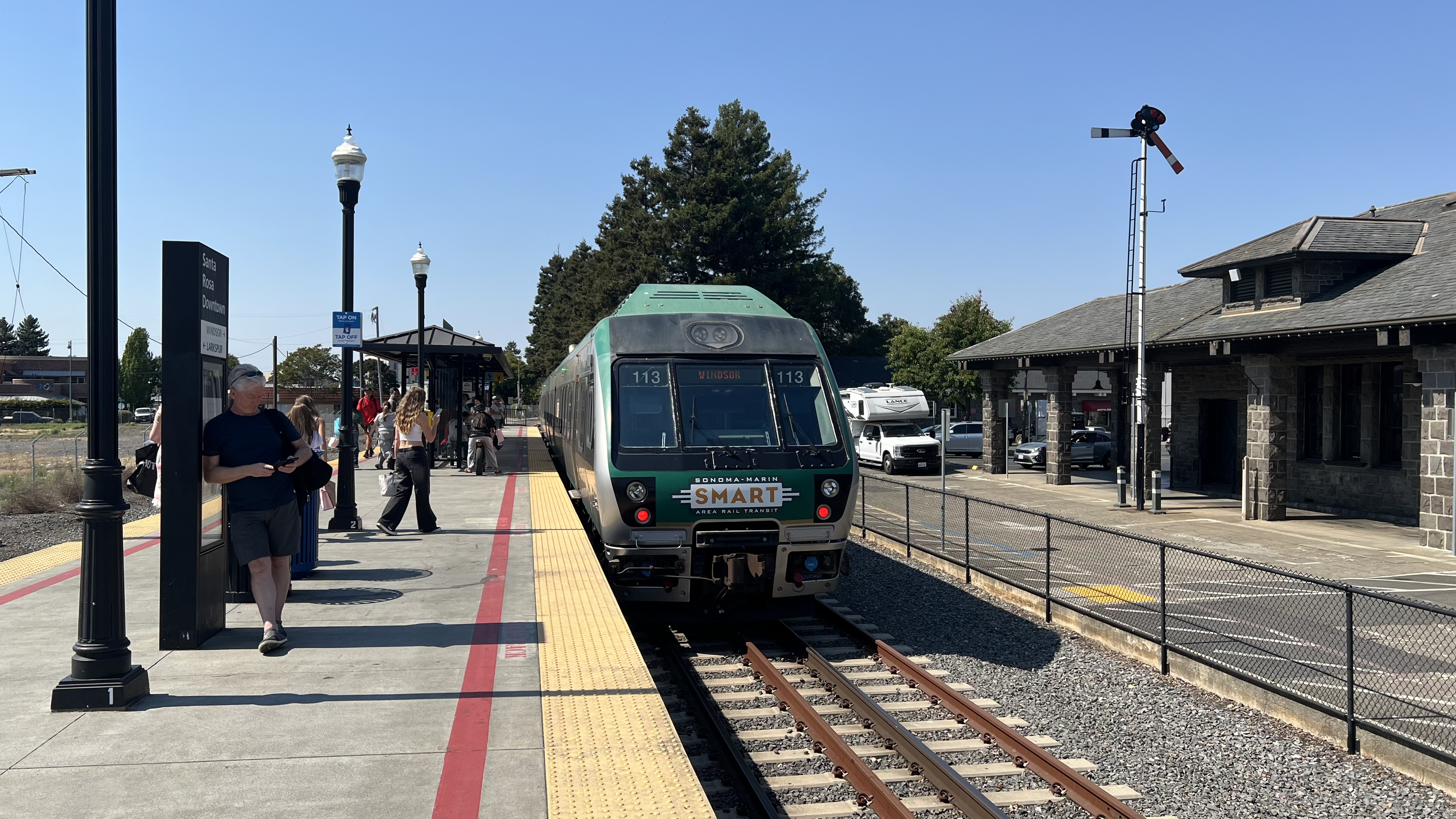
Santa Rosa downtown SMART rail station with northbound train

=== Rolling stock ===
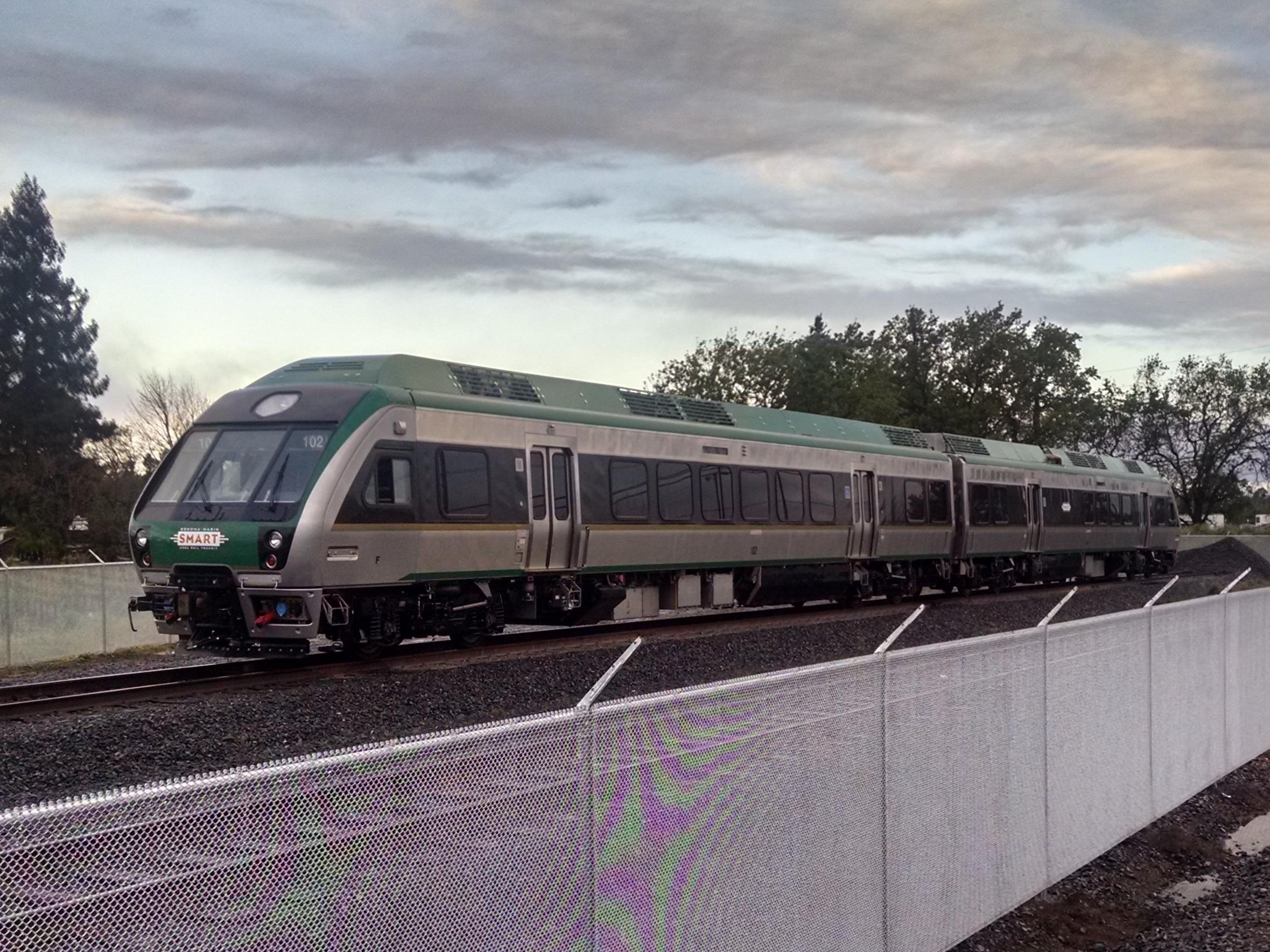
Nippon Sharyo DMU 102 in SMART livery parked in Fulton

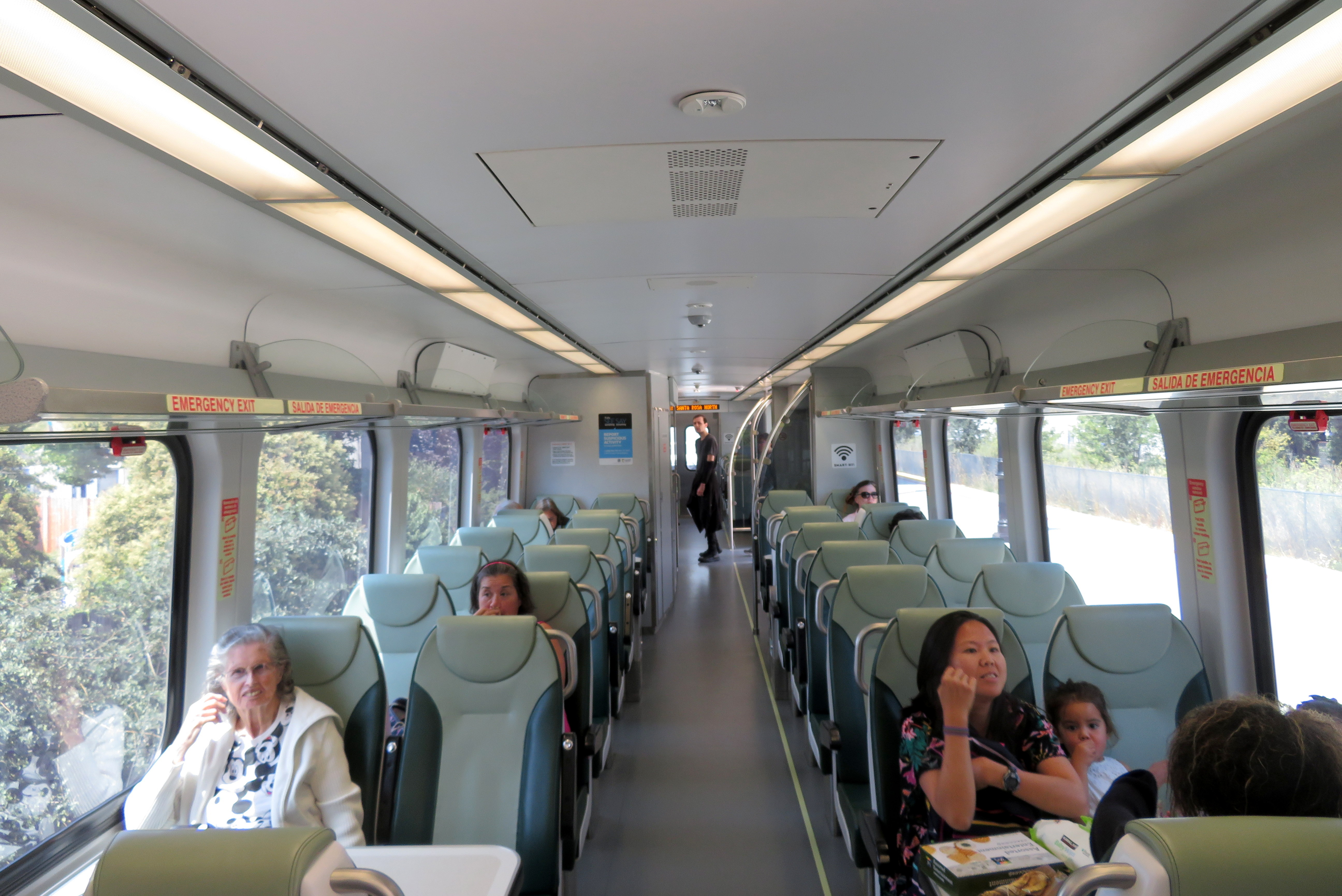
Interior view

The SMART fleet utilizes nine two-car Nippon Sharyo DMU trainsets. Each 85-foot (26 m) self-propelled car is powered by a Cummins QSK19-R diesel engine rated at 760 hp (570 kW), meeting EPA Tier 4 emission standards and FRA Tier 1 crashworthiness requirements. Each car seats 79 passengers with capacity for 80 standing, for a total of 318 per two-car set. In regular service, trains run in pairs or triplicates. Trains can match platform lengths as long as cabs face the outer ends. Onboard amenities include free Wi-Fi, a concession stand, and dedicated storage racks for bicycles.

The initial $46.7 million order with Sumitomo Corporation/Nippon Sharyo covered seven trainsets, assembled in Rochelle, Illinois, and tested at the Transportation Technology Center in Pueblo, Colorado. The first set arrived in Cotati, California, on April 7, 2015. On July 30, 2015, an $11 million state grant funded the purchase of three additional cars. In April 2016, SMART adjusted the order to receive two full trainsets instead of individual cars, meeting the nine-trainset requirement for future Cloverdale service. The fleet is painted in "McGlashan green."

Four additional cars (115–118) delivered in 2018 sustained damage during freight transport and required assessment and repair by Nippon Sharyo.

Fleet
Year	Numbers	Model	Notes
2014–2015	101–114	A/B car	
2018	115–118	A/B car	Damaged in delivery

=== Rail Operations Center ===
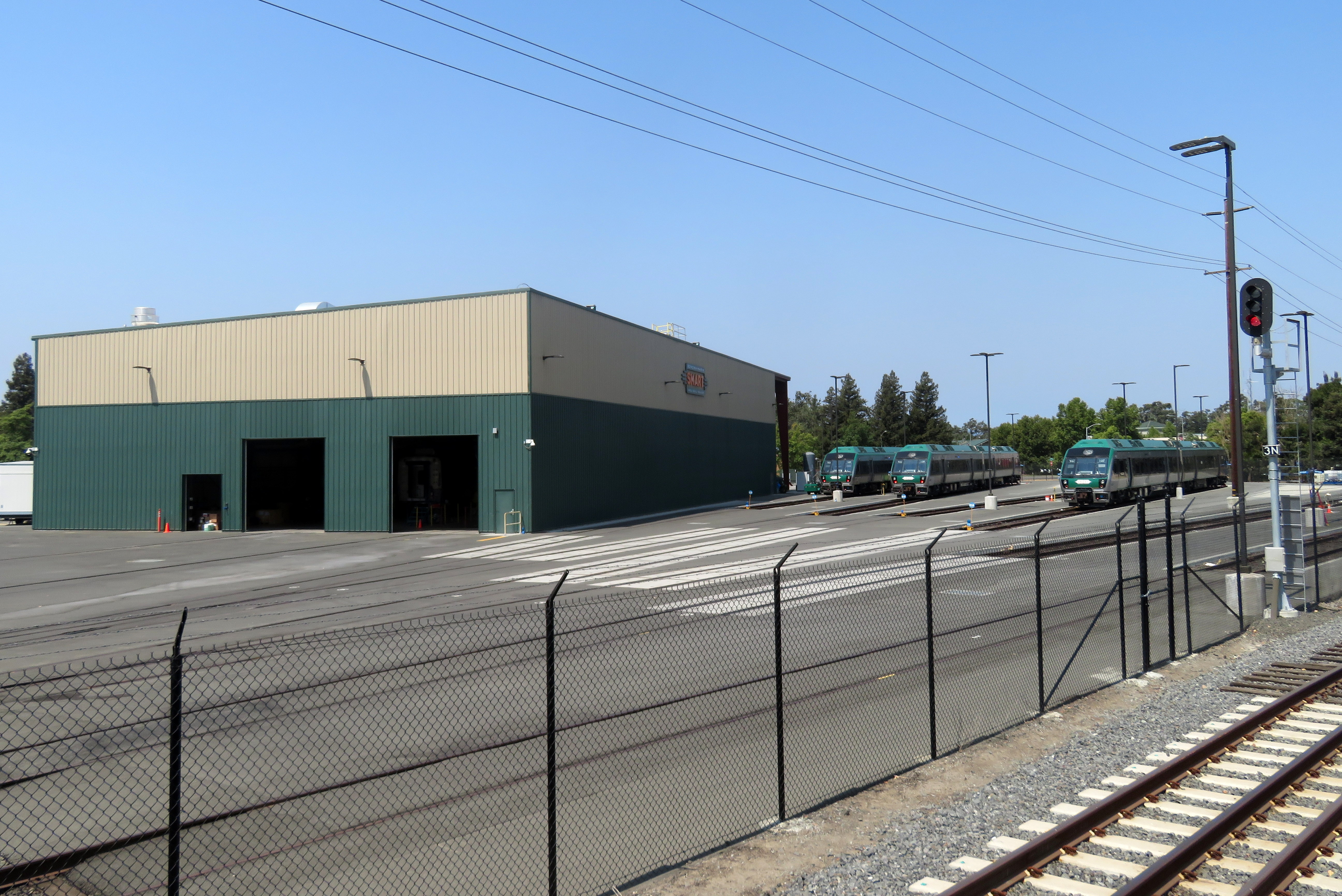
SMART vehicles at the Rail Operations Center in north Santa Rosa

The SMART Rail Operations Center (ROC), located on a 6.6-acre parcel at Airport Boulevard in north Santa Rosa, is the agency's primary maintenance and operations facility. The three-story, 19,200-square-foot structure was built at a cost of approximately $18 million and completed in January 2016, roughly eighteen months before revenue service began. It houses vehicle inspection bays, maintenance shops, car washing facilities, and a dispatch control room from which SMART manages both passenger and freight train movements on the corridor. The ROC sits adjacent to the Sonoma County Airport station. The agency recalled all vehicles to the ROC in 2016 to rebuild the Cummins QSK19-R engine crankshafts following a design flaw identified on a near-identical Union Pearson Express trainset in Toronto.

=== Bicycle and pedestrian pathway ===
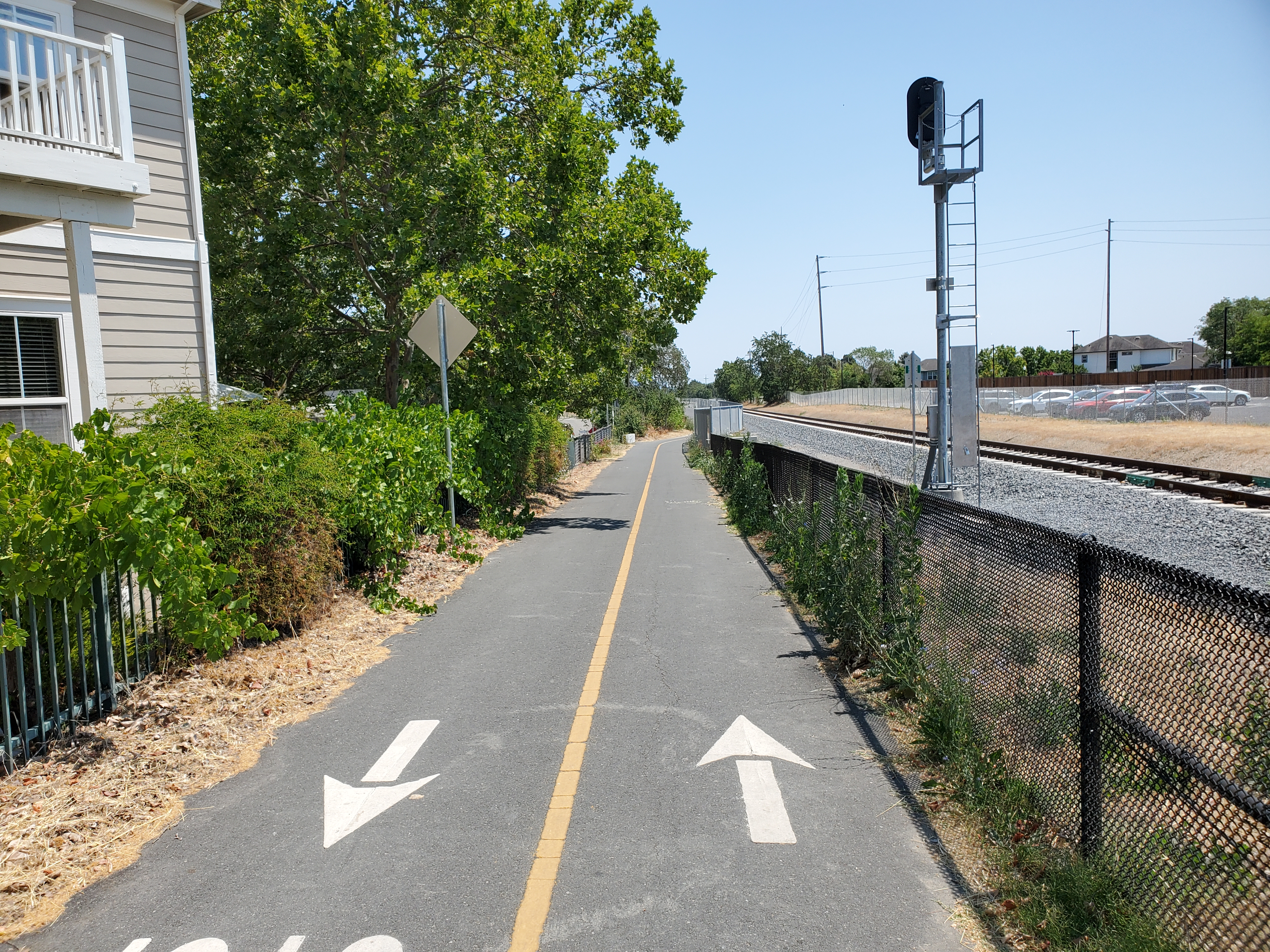
The SMART Pathway near Windsor in 2025

The original expenditure plan allocated $90 million for a parallel bicycle/pedestrian path. Due to financial constraints, SMART redirected pathway construction to bridge gaps between existing paths and provide station access. By early 2019, 16.2 miles (26.1 km) of the pathway had been completed in partnership with local jurisdictions.

== Operations ==
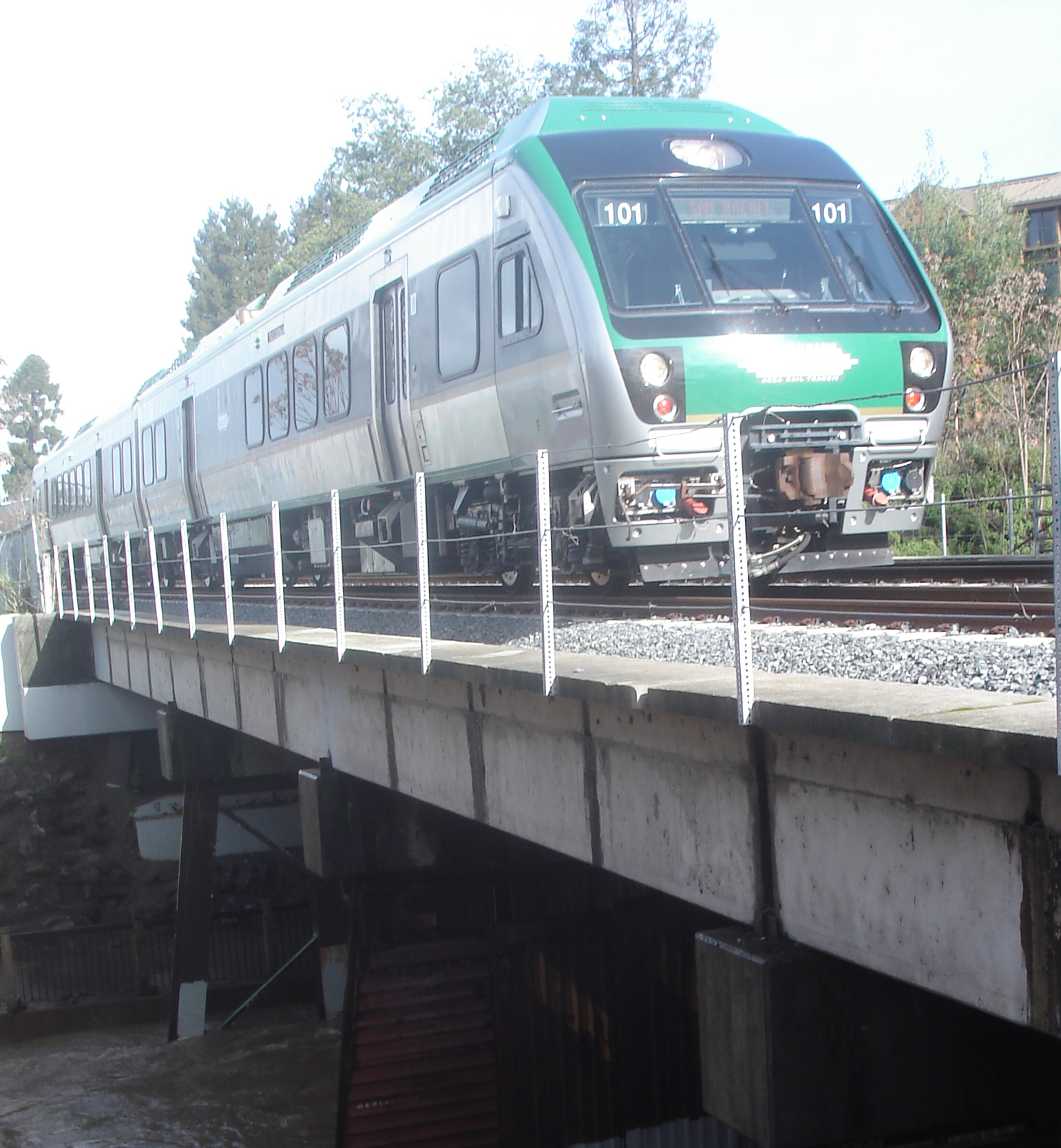
Nippon Sharyo DMU 101 on the bridge over Santa Rosa Creek in January 2017

Prior to the Windsor station opening in May 2025, trains operated 24 round trips on weekdays and 12 round trips on weekends. The 48-mile (77 km) route averaged approximately 34.1 miles per hour (54.9 km/h) including station stops. As a Class 4 railroad, the maximum passenger speed is 79 miles per hour (127 km/h). Because 85% of the route is single-tracked, the schedule is tightly constrained; trains must pass each other at precise siding locations.

=== Fares ===
SMART uses a zone-based proof-of-payment system accepting the Clipper card and the SMART eTickets mobile app. Fares are calculated by zones traveled, with transfer discounts available from connecting bus operators. Discounted fares are available for children, senior citizens, low-income riders, and persons with disabilities. Monthly and day passes are offered, and paid parking is available at stations.

=== Additional services ===
Excursion trains operate for special events, including the Marin County Fair. Prior to 2017, Sonoma Raceway operated a race-day excursion using Amtrak equipment on SMART-owned right-of-way off the mainline tracks.

=== Ridership ===
SMART was the first Bay Area transit agency to recover its pre-pandemic ridership, recording 750,016 annual passengers in 2023 (4% above 2019). Daily ridership remained below the original projection of 5,100. SMART recorded 851,115 passengers in fiscal year 2024, 19% above fiscal year 2019, setting records for weekday, Saturday, and Sunday boardings. Fiscal year 2025 ridership reached 1,329,300, a system record since service began in 2017.

As of the second quarter of 2026, weekday ridership was 5,200.

Annual ridership (Note: Figures use calendar years for 2017, 2021, 2022, and 2023; fiscal years (July–June) for FY2018–19, FY2024, and FY2025. Data sources use different reporting periods.)121% over 2021; Sunday service restored May 2022
Year	Annual riders	Notes
2017 (partial)	252,295	August 25–December 31 only; weekday avg. 2,191
FY2018–19 (Jul 2018 – Jun 2019)	716,847	First complete fiscal year; service between Airport and San Rafael only
2021	225,636	COVID-19 pandemic reduced service; no weekend service until May 2022
2022	498,566	
2023	750,016	First Bay Area agency to recover pre-pandemic ridership (4% above 2019 baseline)
FY2024 (Jul 2023 – Jun 2024)	851,115	19% above FY2019; set records for weekday, Saturday, and Sunday boardings
FY2025 (Jul 2024 – Jun 2025)	1,329,300	System record since 2017 opening; Windsor station opened May 2025

== Safety ==
SMART agency spokesperson Matt Stevens stated in November 2023 that since revenue service began in August 2017, SMART trains had been involved in 22 grade-crossing incidents resulting in 16 fatalities, eight of which were determined to be suicides. No derailments were reported on the SMART system during that period. The Golf Course Drive at-grade crossing in Rohnert Park was the site of five fatalities within thirteen months; by October 2019, Rohnert Park City Council formally asked SMART to reduce train speed at that intersection.

Beginning in 2019, SMART installed Z-gate pedestrian channelization fencing at 30 of its 63 at-grade crossings, starting with high-priority crossings in Petaluma, Rohnert Park, and Santa Rosa.

SMART operates quiet zones (areas where trains are not required to sound horns except in emergency) across nearly its full corridor. Quiet zones took effect in Novato, San Rafael, and Marin County crossings on May 12, 2017; in Santa Rosa on June 7, 2017; in Penngrove, Cotati, and Rohnert Park on November 21, 2017; and in Petaluma on May 24, 2018. Windsor received quiet zone designation on August 5, 2025, following community complaints about horn noise that led SMART to temporarily suspend three early-morning departures after the station opened.

== Governance ==
The Sonoma–Marin Area Rail Transit District is a special-purpose district. The board of directors represents the cities and transit agencies served along the line. The twelve members consist of:

- Two members appointed by the Sonoma County Board of Supervisors (also serving on the Sonoma County Transportation Authority).
- Two members appointed by the Marin County Board of Supervisors.
- Three mayors or council members appointed by the Sonoma County Mayors and Council Members Association.
- One member of the Novato City Council appointed by the Marin County Congestion Management Agency.
- One member of the San Rafael City Council appointed by the Marin County Congestion Management Agency.
- One mayor or council member appointed by the Marin County Council of Mayors and Council Members.
- Two members appointed by the Golden Gate Bridge, Highway and Transportation District.

In January 2011, General Manager Lilian Hames resigned amid financial challenges. Farhad Mansourian was appointed acting General Manager and assumed the permanent role in August 2011. Mansourian previously served as Director of Public Works for Marin County. His combined annual compensation from SMART ($346,000) and his Marin County pension ($148,000) faced initial public scrutiny. The SMART board stated that hiring an out-of-state manager would be more costly and cited Mansourian's experience with local permitting and public works.

The official color of SMART is "McGlashan green," named after former Marin County Supervisor Charles McGlashan, a SMART proponent who died in 2011.

== See also ==
- North Pacific Coast Railroad – a predecessor railroad of the NWP that served Marin and Sonoma counties with interurban routes from 1874 to 1902.
- List of San Francisco Bay Area trains
- List of California railroads
- List of rail transit systems in the United States
