= Colorado Railcar DMU =

Diesel multiple unit train

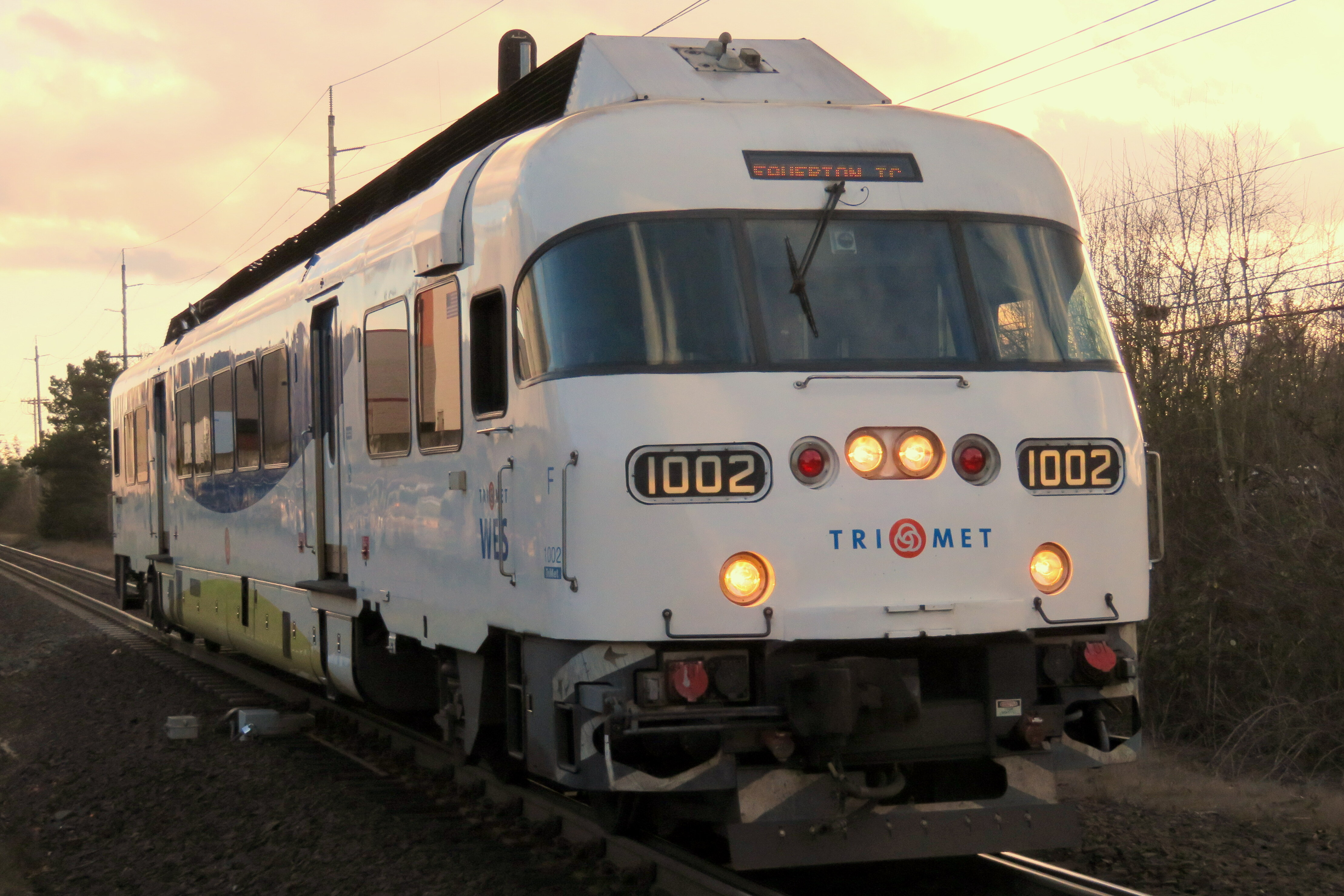

- The inside of a Colorado Railcar DMU on the WES Commuter Rail
- Stock type: Diesel multiple unit
- Manufacturer: Colorado Railcar
- Constructed: 2002–2008
- Number built: 9
- Number in service: 4
- Capacity: 92 (single level); 185 (bi-level)

Specifications
- Car length: 85 ft (26 m)
- Height: 14 ft 7 in (4.45 m) (single level); 19 ft 6 in (5.94 m) (bi-level)
- Maximum speed: 100 mph (160 km/h)
- Prime mover: 2 Detroit Diesel series 60
- Power output: 1,200 hp (890 kW)
- Track gauge: 1,435 mm (4 ft 8 1/2 in) standard gauge

The Colorado Railcar DMU is a diesel multiple unit train that was manufactured by Colorado Railcar from 2002 to 2008. The DMU was offered in single-level and bi-level versions. The DMU was discontinued after Colorado Railcar shut down in 2008.

== History ==
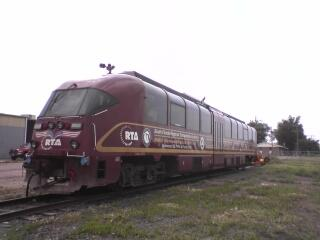
The original prototype DMU featured everything the DMU could be ordered with, including dome windows.

The first DMU demonstrator (numbered 2002) was built in 2002. The DMU was built to meet FRA's 49 CFR Part 238 compression load requirements, which made it the first modern FRA compliant DMU in the United States. The DMU toured the US Between 2002–2004 to demonstrate the DMU to potential future operators.

=== Revenue DMU Orders ===
In 2005, the first bi-level DMU would be built for Tri Rail as part of an order for four DMU units that would be built from 2005–2007. TriMet in Portland ordered three DMUs and one cab car for use on its WES Commuter Rail line that were built in 2007–2008. Alaska Railroad ordered one bi-level DMU that was built in 2008.

=== Aftermarket Orders ===
In 2024, the French Lick Scenic Railway acquired a 3 car set of Ex Tri Rail cars, consisting of powered DMU 704 and unpowered cars 7001 and 7002. They are to be used on the Railway's various excursion trains. A few days later, a new photo was uploaded to the Railway's facebook page, showing that 706 has also been acquired.

== Details ==
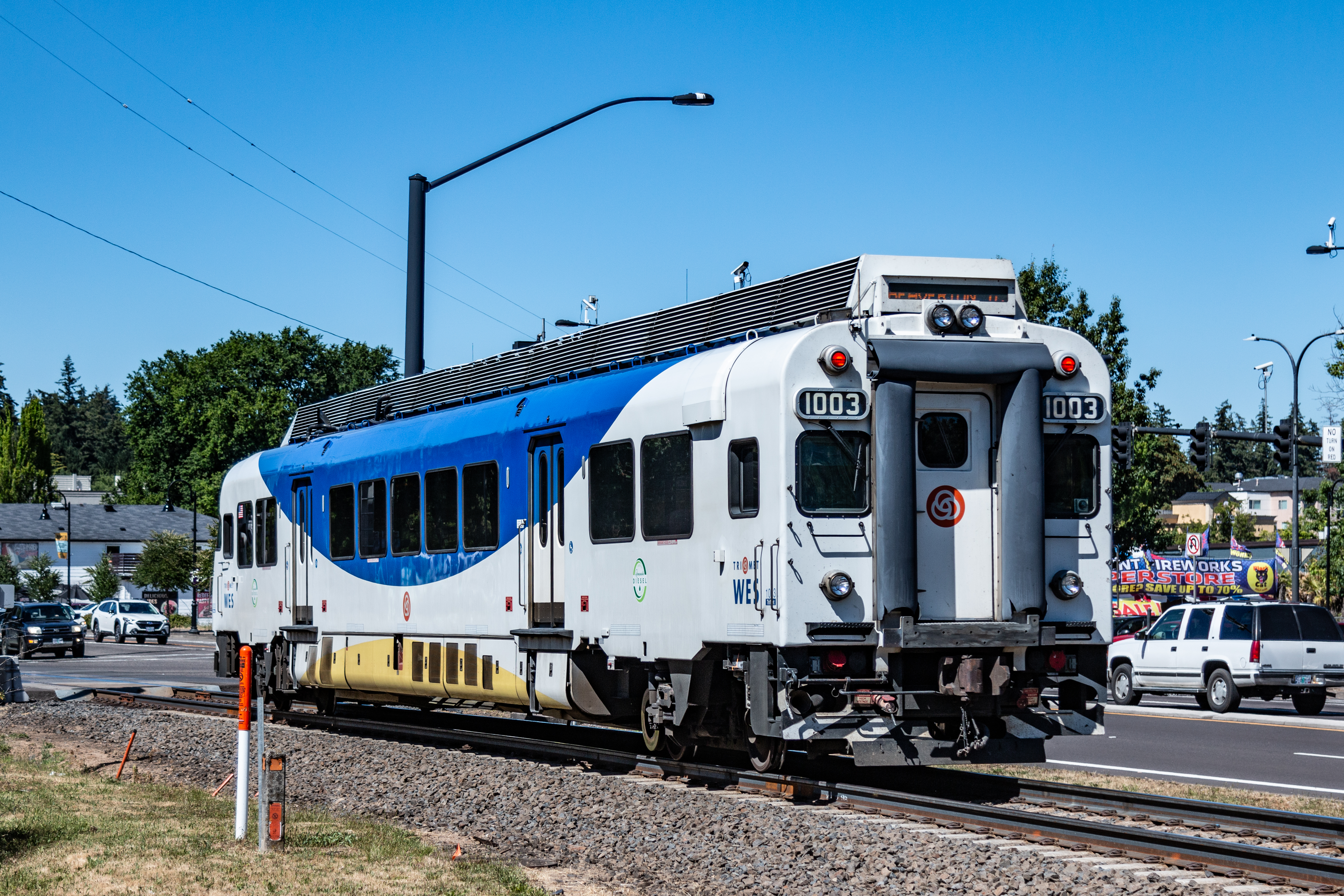
The flat cab of a double ended DMU.

The DMU is powered by two Detroit Diesel engines with a combined 1,200 horsepower (890 kilowatts). Each DMU is capable of traveling up to 100 mph (160 km/h). The DMU is 85 ft (26 m) long with a height of 14 ft 7 in (4.45 m) (19 ft 6 in (5.94 m) for the bi-level DMU). The DMU has 92 seats (190 for the bi-level). DMUs can be either single ended or double ended. The single level DMU has a streamlined cab at one end, and a flat cab on the other end (if the DMU is double ended). Bi-level DMUs are all flat cab units, but can have the roof of DMU slanted. DMUs can be fitted with dome widows or standard windows.

== Operators ==
=== All Time Fleet overview ===
Powered DMUs
Operator	Numbers	Quantity	model	notes
Colorado Railcar	2002	1	single level	Renumbered to 702, Currently stored at Pueblo, Colorado.
Tri-Rail	703-706	4	bi-level	Retired from service in 2012, 1 train set was sent to Sunrail in 2014 for testing, all units were stored on Tri Rail property until 2023. Now at Indiana Railway Museum.
WES Commuter Rail	1001-1003	3	Single level	Double ended units, all Currently in service
Alaska Railroad	751	1	bi-level	Used on the Glacier Discovery.
French Lick Scenic Railway	703-706	4	bi-level	2nd hand owner, Ex Tri Rail 703-706, delivered in 2024 along with unpowered cars 7001-7002.

Unpowered Cars
Operator	Numbers	Quantity	Model	notes
Tri-Rail	7001-7002	2	bi level passenger car	Removed from service in 2012, 1 trainset was sent to Sunrail in 2014 for testing, all units were stored on Tri Rail property until 2023.
WES Commuter Rail	2001	1	single level cab car	Only unpowered cab car built by Colorado Railcar, currently in service.
French Lick Scenic Railway	7001-7002	2	bi level passenger car	2nd hand owner, Ex Tri Rail 7001-7002, delivered in 2024 along with powered cars 703-706.

=== WES commuter rail ===
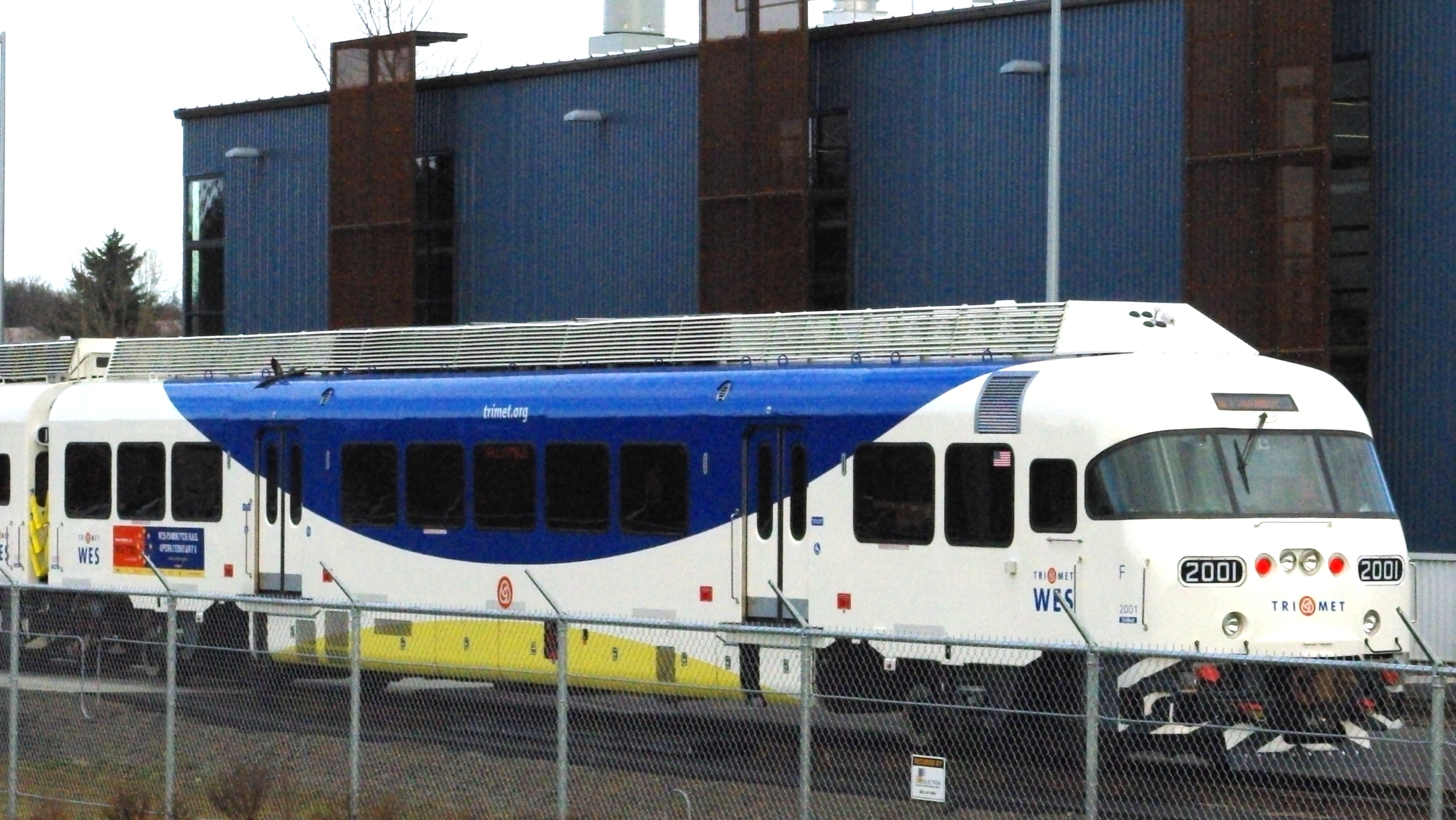
Cab car 2001 is identical to the powered DMUs except for the last rear window, which is the same size as the rest of the windows compared to the powered DMUs, which have smaller rear window due to it being a cab window.

TriMet's fleet of commuter-rail cars consists of three powered cars and one "control trailer", a type of car which isn't powered but has an operating cab at one end and can control the powered car to which it is coupled. The trailer can be pulled or pushed. The self-propelled diesel cars do not require a locomotive or overhead electrical wires. The cars are numbered 1001–1003 (powered) and 2001 (trailer) in TriMet's fleet of vehicles. Originally priced at $4 million each prior to cost overruns, the cars are equipped with places for two mobility devices and two hanging bicycle racks, and have enough space for 139 standing passengers. In a two-car train, passengers can pass between the two connected cars. Interiors of both car types contain high-back seats with blue upholstery.

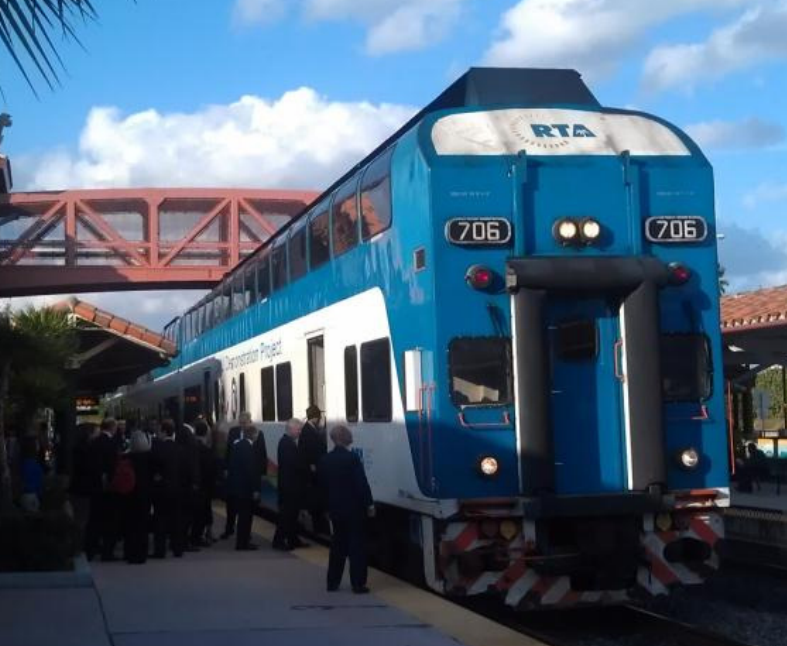
A Tri Rail DMU

=== Tri Rail ===
In 2003, after receiving a grant from the Florida Department of Transportation, Tri-Rail contracted to purchase rolling stock from Colorado Railcar. Tri-Rail possessed four DMU control cars and two unpowered trailer cars. One DMU train usually consists of two DMU power cars at each end of a trailer coach (making for two complete DMU+trailer+DMU sets on the system). One train set was sent to the SunRail Rand Yard in Sanford, FL, months before the system opened, for testing purposes on their new commuter line. The train set was sent back to the CSX Hialeah Yard soon after SunRail began revenue service. As of 2012, all the DMUs and trailers were retired and out of service. They were in storage at the Tri-Rail service facility until 2023, when they were removed.

=== Alaska Railroad ===
The Alaska Railroad ordered 1 DMU, numbered 751. This DMU was originally supposed to be used on a new whistle-stop service. The DMU has since been used as an end car on the Glacier Discovery.

=== French Lick Scenic Railway ===
The French Lick Scenic Railway acquired Tri Rail 704, 706, 7001, and 7002 for use on its various excursion trains along with 703 and 705 for parts.

== Successor ==
In 2009, US Railcar took over Colorado Railcar after the company shut down. They intend to continue producing DMUs for the US market, but have not received any orders as of 2023.

== See also ==
- Nippon Sharyo DMU
- Budd Rail Diesel Car
