= Puerto Suello Hill Tunnel =

California rail tunnel

Puerto Suello Tunnel
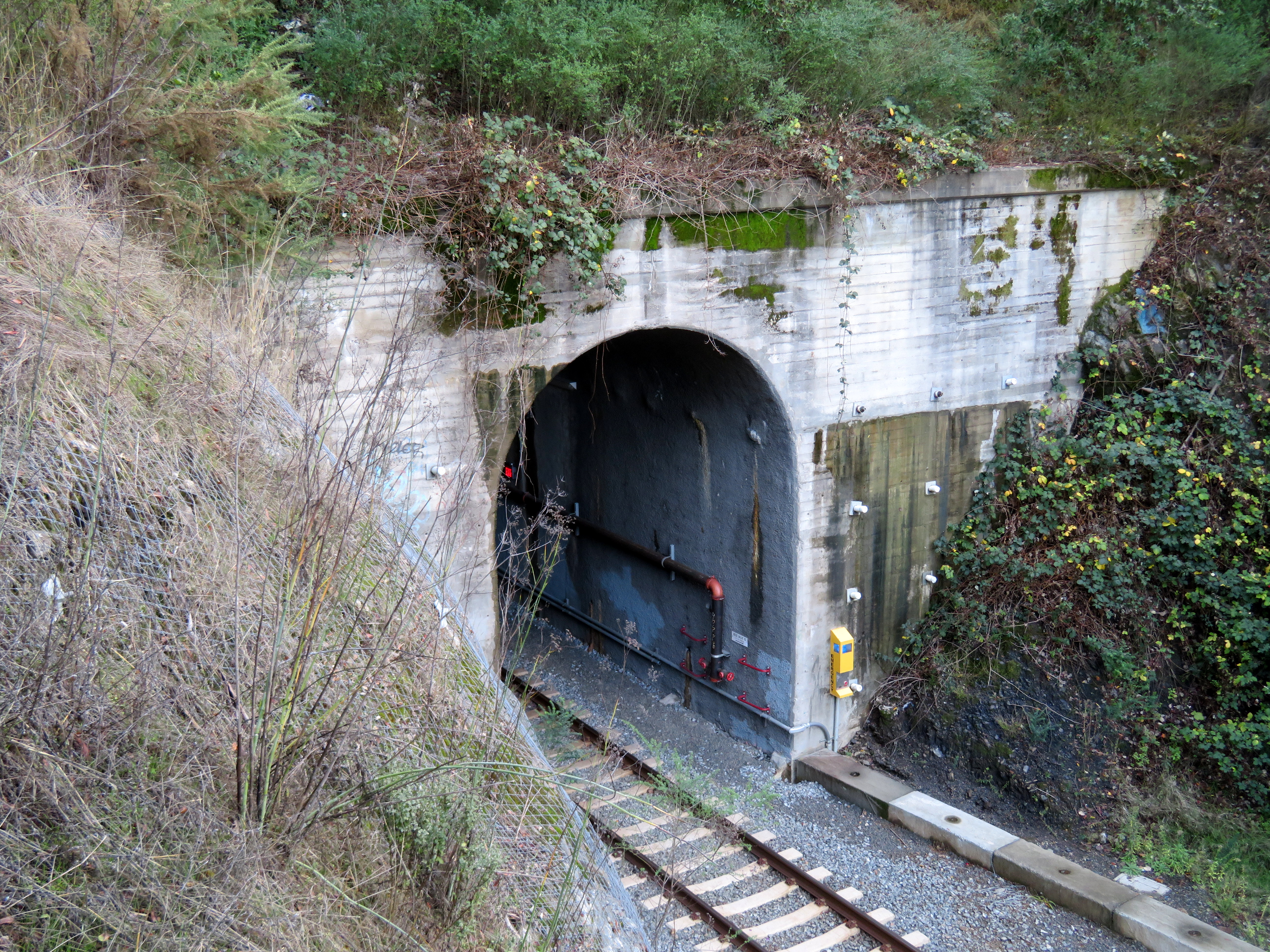
- The north portal of the tunnel in December 2019
- Interactive map of Puerto Suello Tunnel

Overview
- Location: San Rafael, California
- Coordinates: 37°59′21″N 122°31′45″W
- Status: in service
- Start: Lincoln Avenue / Los Ranchitos Road
- End: Hammondale Court

Operation
- Opened: 1879
- Closed: 1985
- Rebuilt: 1967
- Reopened: 2017
- Owner: Sonoma–Marin Area Rail Transit
- Operator: Sonoma–Marin Area Rail Transit
- Character: Commuter rail tunnel

Technical
- Track length: 1/4 mile (0.4 km)
- No. of tracks: 1
- Track gauge: 4 ft 8 1/2 in (1,435 mm) standard gauge
- Min elevation: 50 feet (15 m) below surface

Puerto Suello Tunnel is a quarter-mile long rail tunnel in San Rafael, California. It was constructed in 1879, by the San Francisco and North Pacific Railroad.

== Background ==
The 1/4 mile (0.4 km) long tunnel was built in 1879 by the San Francisco and North Pacific Railroad.

It was partially destroyed in 1961 by a fire, which was set by two boys. The fire killed 23-year-old firefighter Frank Kinsler when his truck fell 50 feet into the chasm. It was rebuilt for freight service in 1967, but was closed and boarded up in 1985 with the discontinuation of Northwestern Pacific Railroad services. The state-owned North Coast Railroad Authority and the Golden Gate Bridge, Highway and Transportation District took ownership of the tunnel in the 1970s and was thereafter acquired by SMART in 2003.

It was retrofitted by SMART for a cost of $3 million in 2015. The 2017 California floods caused damage to the tunnel, delaying system's opening testing for three weeks.
