= Indiana Railway Museum =

Railroad in French Lick, Indiana, U.S.

Coordinates: 38.5550°N 86.6170°W

French Lick Scenic Railway
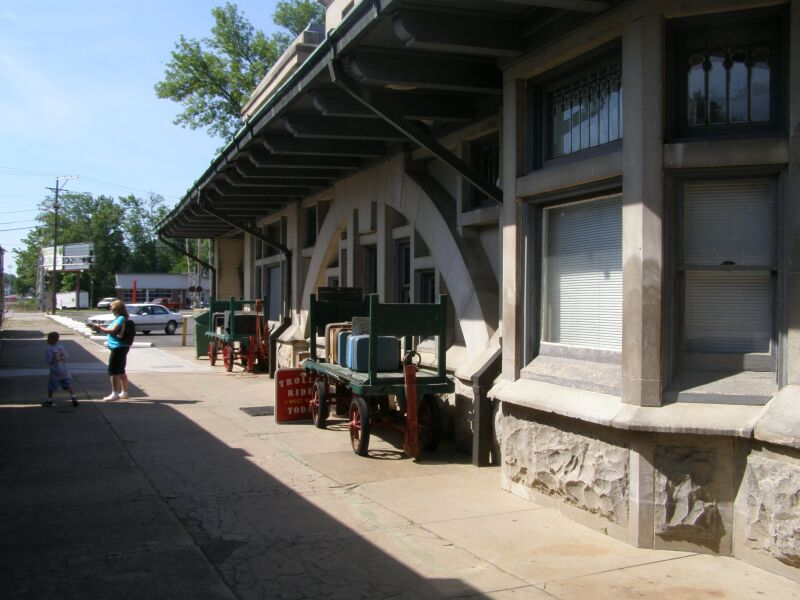
- Main Station

Overview
- Headquarters: French Lick, Indiana
- Reporting mark: IRM
- Locale: Indiana
- Dates of operation: 1961–present

Technical
- Track gauge: 4 ft 8 1/2 in (1,435 mm) standard gauge

The French Lick Scenic Railway is located in French Lick, Indiana, United States.

== History ==
The Indiana Railway Museum was founded in 1961 in the Decatur County town of Westport with one locomotive and three passenger cars. The museum relocated to Greensburg and then in 1978 to French Lick after the Southern Railway deeded a total of sixteen miles of right of way stretching from West Baden, Indiana, approximately one mile north of French Lick, to a small village named Dubois, to the south. The museum eventually removed all artifacts and became a gift shop and ticket pick up area for the French Lick Scenic Railway which still operates today.

== Collection ==
There is no longer a museum at the French Lick Scenic Railway, but its collection included more than 65 pieces of rolling stock and locomotives. The museum had three steam locomotives on display that are not operational and three operational diesel locomotives.

You can still ride the rails to this day! Excursions are typically powered by a diesel locomotive. The train could consist of an ALCO RS-1 or EMD GP16 pulling 3 ex Chicago and North Western Railroad bi-level commuter cars, a concession car, 4 ex Rock Island passenger cars, an ex Northern Pacific Budd dome car, and an ex Illinois Central caboose.

=== Locomotive roster ===
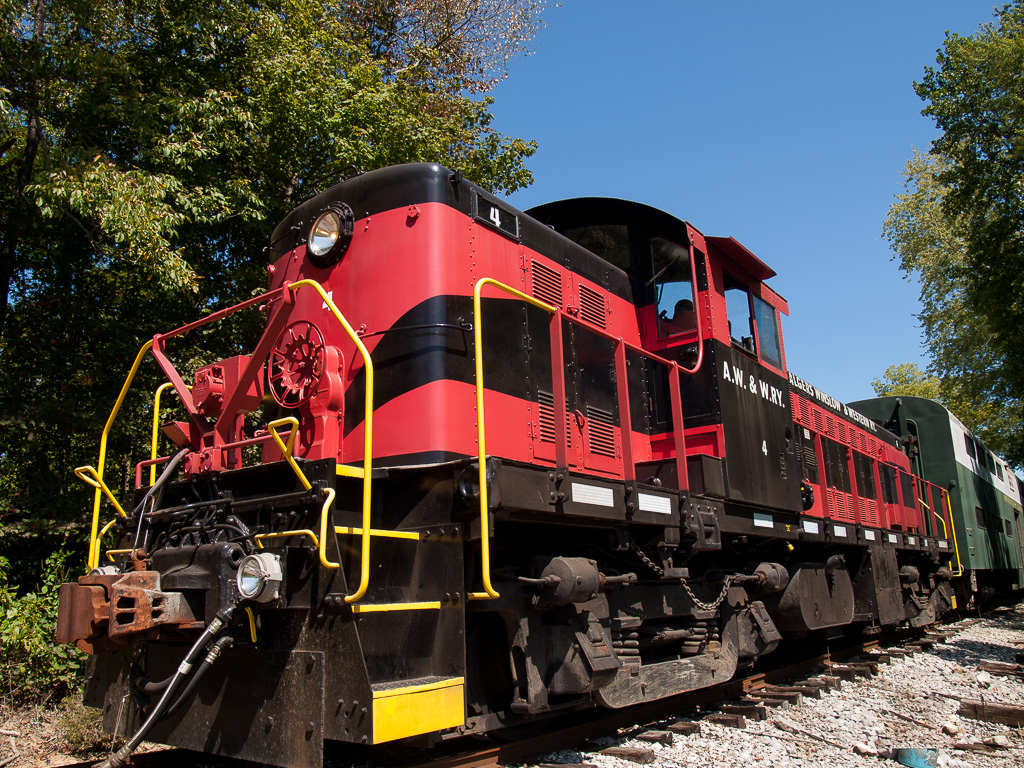
IRM #4 at Gradman, IN

IRM #4 - ALCO RS-1 - Ex Algers, Winslow and Western Railway #4, Built as Duluth, South Shore and Atlantic #103

IRM #6 - GE 80 Ton - Ex US Navy #65-00356

IRM #78 - ALCO S-2 - Ex Michigan Southern #78

IRM #97 - Baldwin 2-6-0 - Built as Mobile and Gulf #97

IRM 101 - ALCO S-4 - Ex Algers, Winslow and Western Railway #1

IRM 208 - Baldwin 2-6-0, built as Angelina and Neches River Railroad #208

IRM 1813 - EMD GP16 - Ex INRD 1813, built as Seaboard Air Line #1810

IRM 703, 704, 705, and 706 - Colorado Railcar DMU - Ex Tri Rail acquired and delivered in 2024 along with unpowered cars 7001–7002.

== Excursions ==
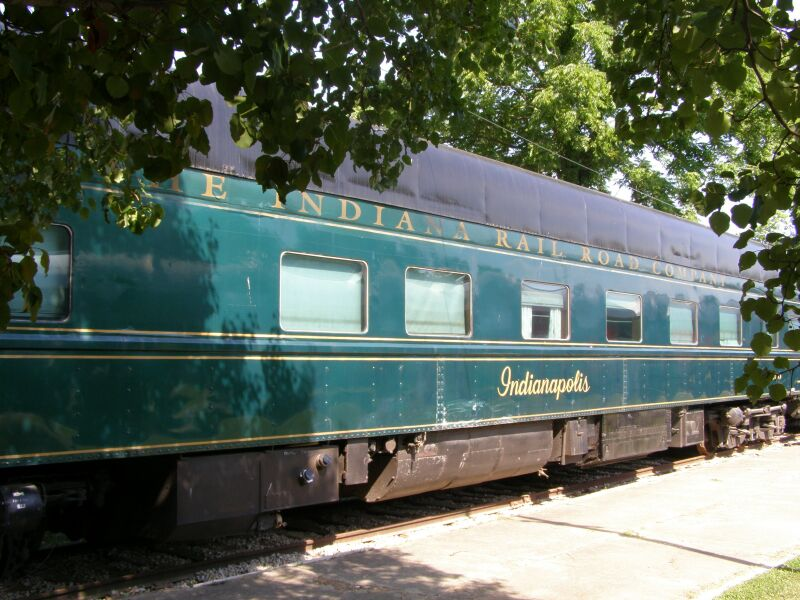
A Pullman Car

The museum operates the 10-mile stretch of the line between French Lick and Gradman station as a heritage railroad known as French Lick Scenic Railway.

Scenic excursions consist of a 20-mile round trip throughout the Hoosier National Forest lasting approximately 1 hour and 45 minutes. A highlight of the trip is passing through the 2,000 foot long Burton Tunnel.

Other special events are run year round. There is the dinosaur adventure train, the Easter bunny express, and the award-winning Polar express.

There are also tasting trains for ages 21+. Wine, beer, tequila, and chocolate are a few of these tasting trains.

== See also ==
- List of heritage railroads in the United States
- List of museums in Indiana

Preceding station	Monon Railroad	Following station
West Baden toward Orleans	Orleans - French Lick	Terminus
Preceding station	Southern Railway	Following station
Cuzco toward Huntingburg	Huntingburg – French Lick	Terminus
