= Girdwood Depot =

Girdwood
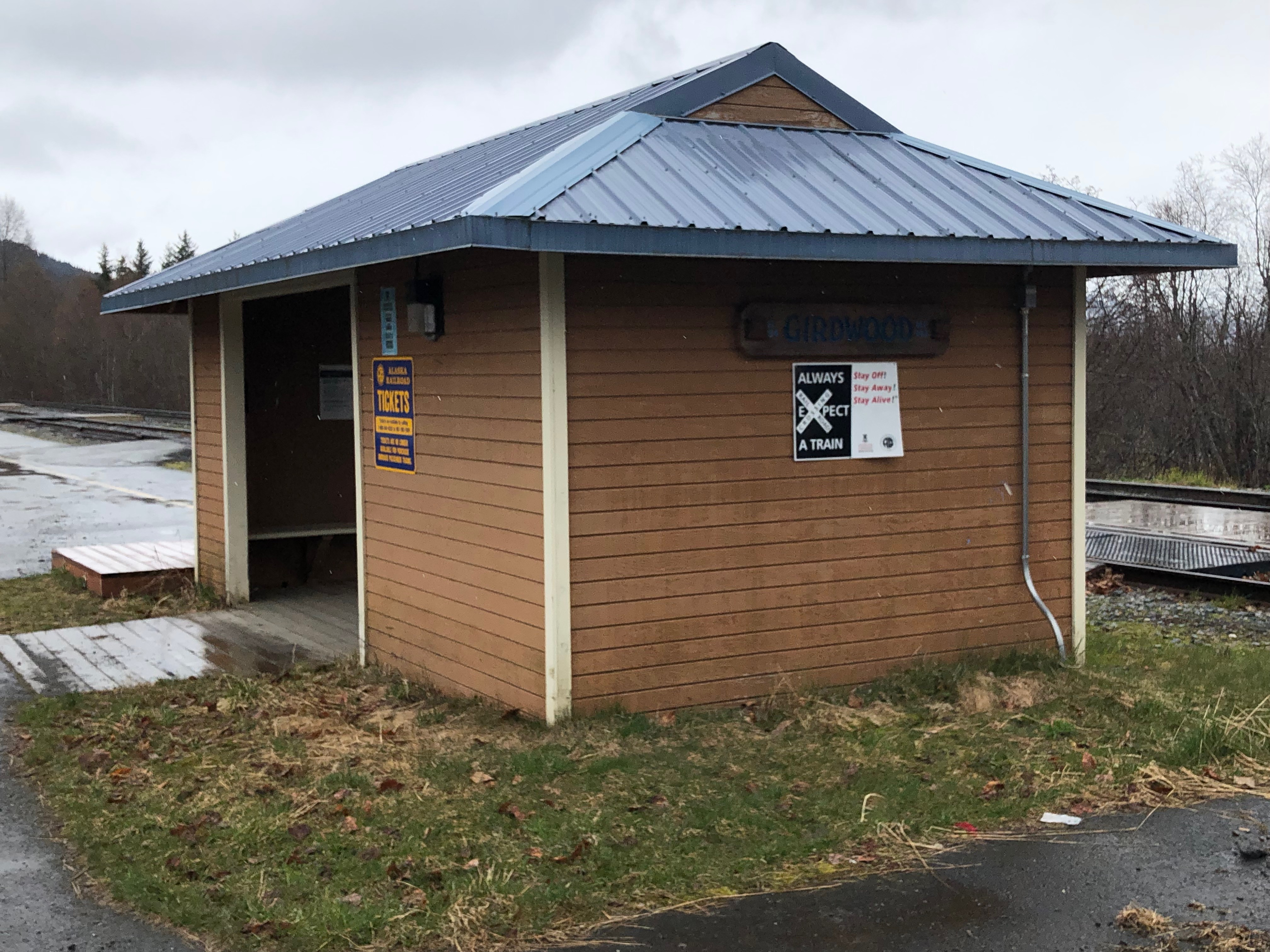

General information
- Location: Brudine Road, Girdwood, Alaska; United States
- Coordinates: 60°56′40″N 149°10′29″W
- Owner: Alaska Railroad
- Platforms: 1 side platform
- Tracks: 1 passing siding and 1 through track

Services
Preceding station	Alaska Railroad	Following station
Anchorage Terminus	Glacier Discovery	Whittier toward Grandview or Anchorage
Anchorage Terminus	Glacier Discovery	Spencer toward Grandview
Anchorage Terminus	Coastal Classic	Seward Terminus
Location

Girdwood Depot is a passenger railroad station in Girdwood, south of Anchorage, Alaska. The station offers service for the Alaska Railroad's Coastal Classic and Glacier Discovery routes.

The station building was built between 1997 and 1998.
