= Glacier Discovery =

Seasonal passenger train, Alaska

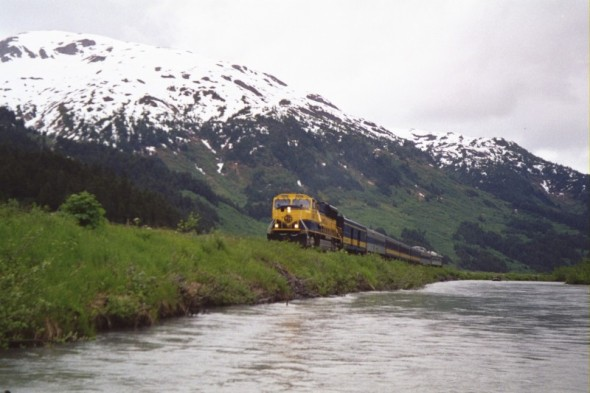

Overview
- Service type: Inter-city/Scenic Tour
- Status: Operating
- Locale: Alaska
- Current operator: Alaska Railroad

Route
- Termini: Anchorage; Grandview
- Stops: 6
- Average journey time: approx. 10 hours
- Service frequency: Daily (May through September)

On-board services
- Catering facilities: Cafe car
- Baggage facilities: Available in Anchorage and Whittier

Technical
- Track gauge: 4 ft 8 1/2 in (1,435 mm) standard gauge
- Operating speed: 59 mph (95 km/h)
- Track owner: Alaska Railroad

The Glacier Discovery is a passenger train operated by the Alaska Railroad between the towns of Anchorage, Whittier Alaska and south on the Seward rail line as far as Grandview whistle stop; then back again. It is a seasonal train, only operating between the months of May and September.

== Stations ==
The Glacier Discovery utilizes part of the Anchorage–Seward route. It makes the following stops:

- Anchorage;
- Girdwood;
- Portage;
- Whittier;
- Portage;
- Spencer Whistle Stop;
- Grandview Whistle Stop.

After the stop at Grandview the train travels back again. Return travelers are offered the opportunity to transfer to a motorcoach in Portage, taking them directly back to Anchorage and allowing them to skip the train's return detour to Whittier.

== Rolling stock ==
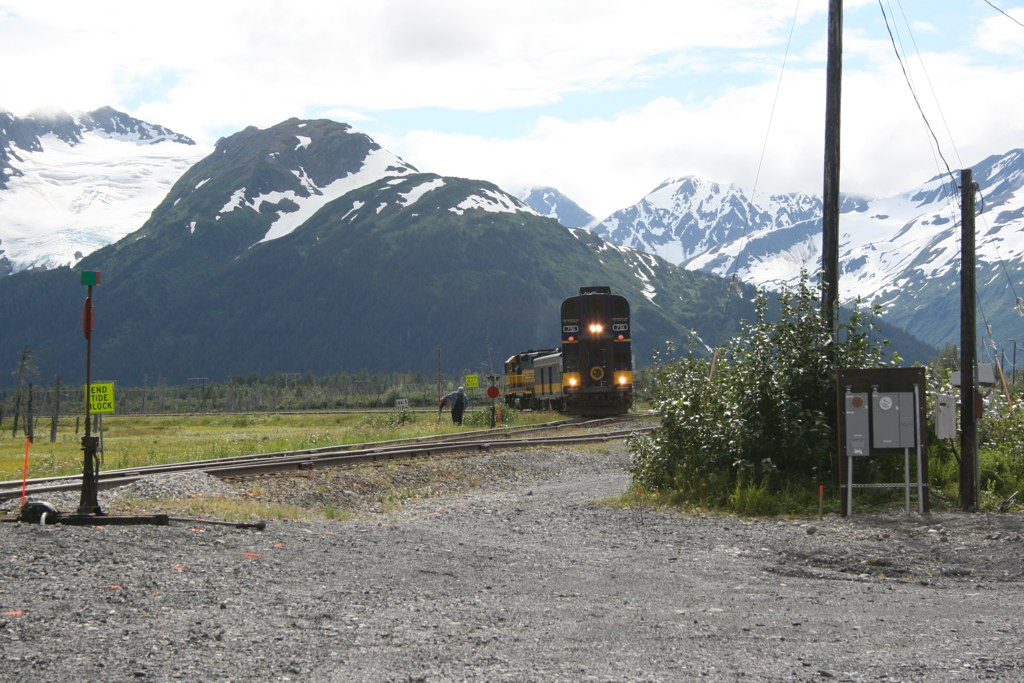
The DMU leads the Glacier Discovery

The Glacier Discovery consist uses the following rolling stock

- 1 EMD GP38-2
- 1 baggage car
- 1-3 single level passenger cars
- 1 Colorado Railcar bi level DMU 751

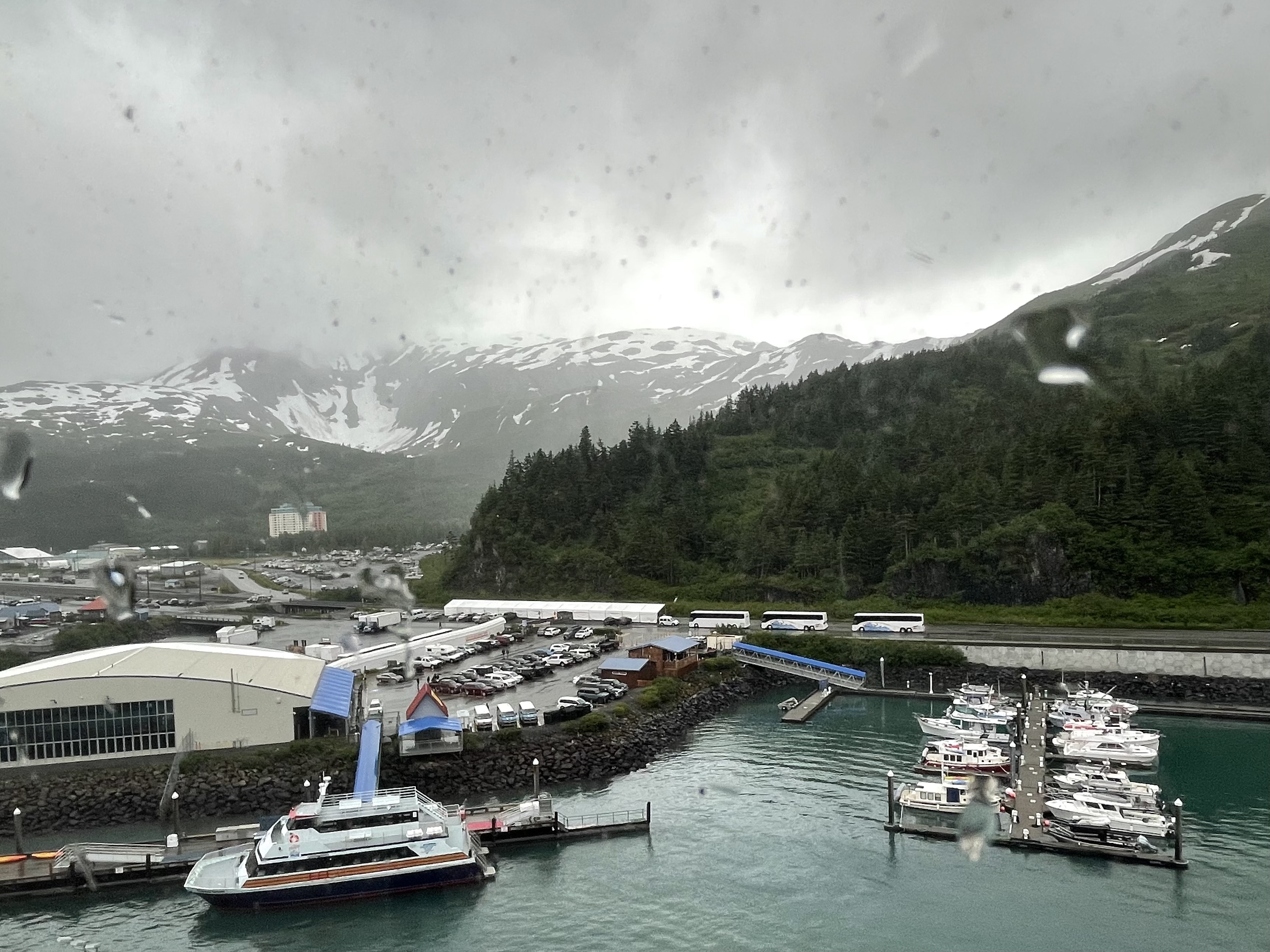
Whittier, Alaska. There is no depot in Whittier. Trains load and off-load passengers in the white tented area across from the cruise ship terminal and the marina.
