= Whittier Terminal Depot =

Whittier HAP Depot
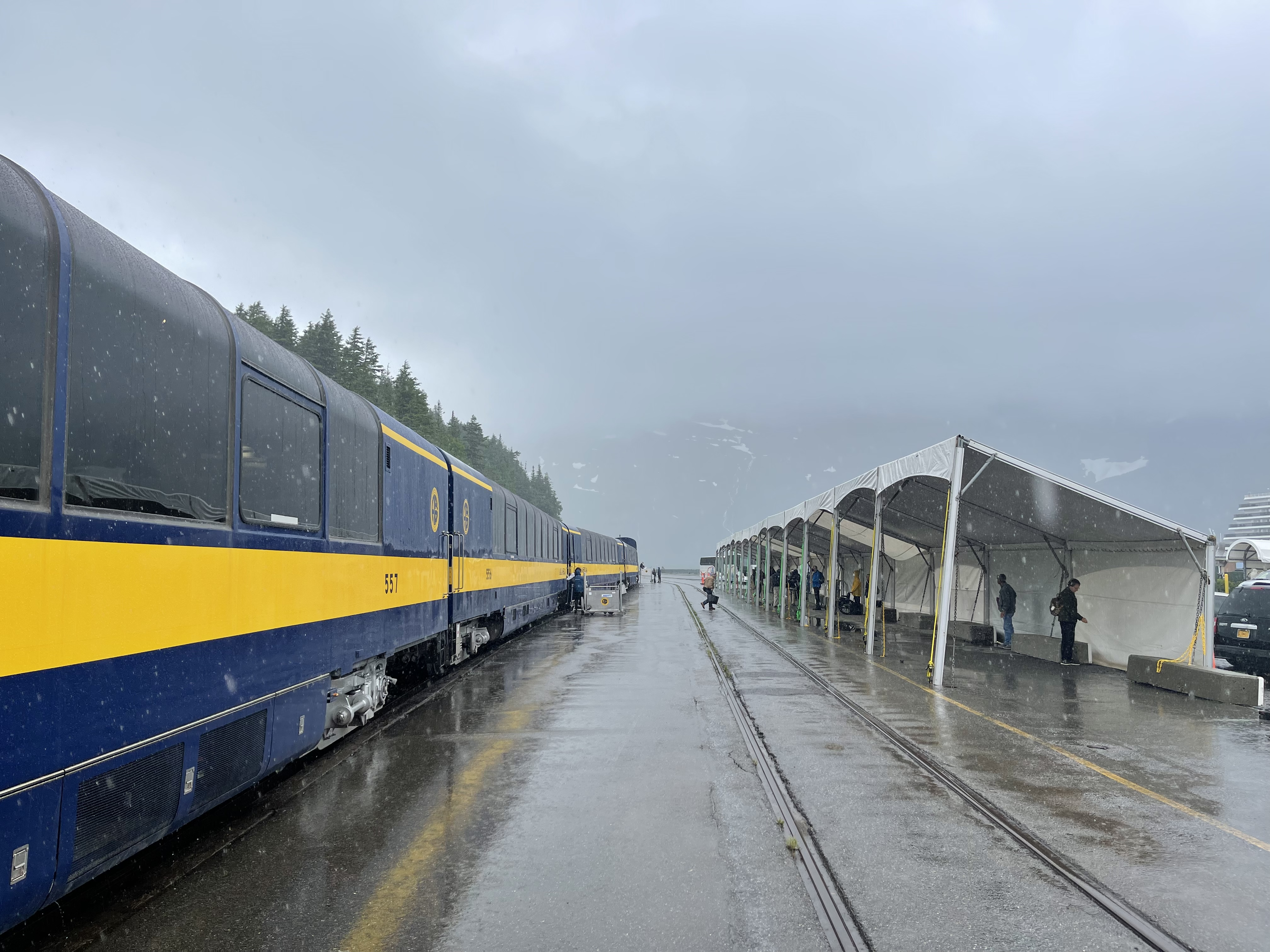
- Trains stop at the white tented area across from the cruise ship terminal and the marina

General information
- Location: West Camp Road; Whittier, Alaska; United States
- Coordinates: 60.7768°N 148.6972°W
- Owner: Alaska Railroad
- Platforms: 1 side platform
- Tracks: 2

Services
Preceding station	Alaska Railroad	Following station
Portage toward Anchorage	Glacier Discovery	Reverses direction
Portage toward Grandview	Glacier Discovery	Reverses direction
Location

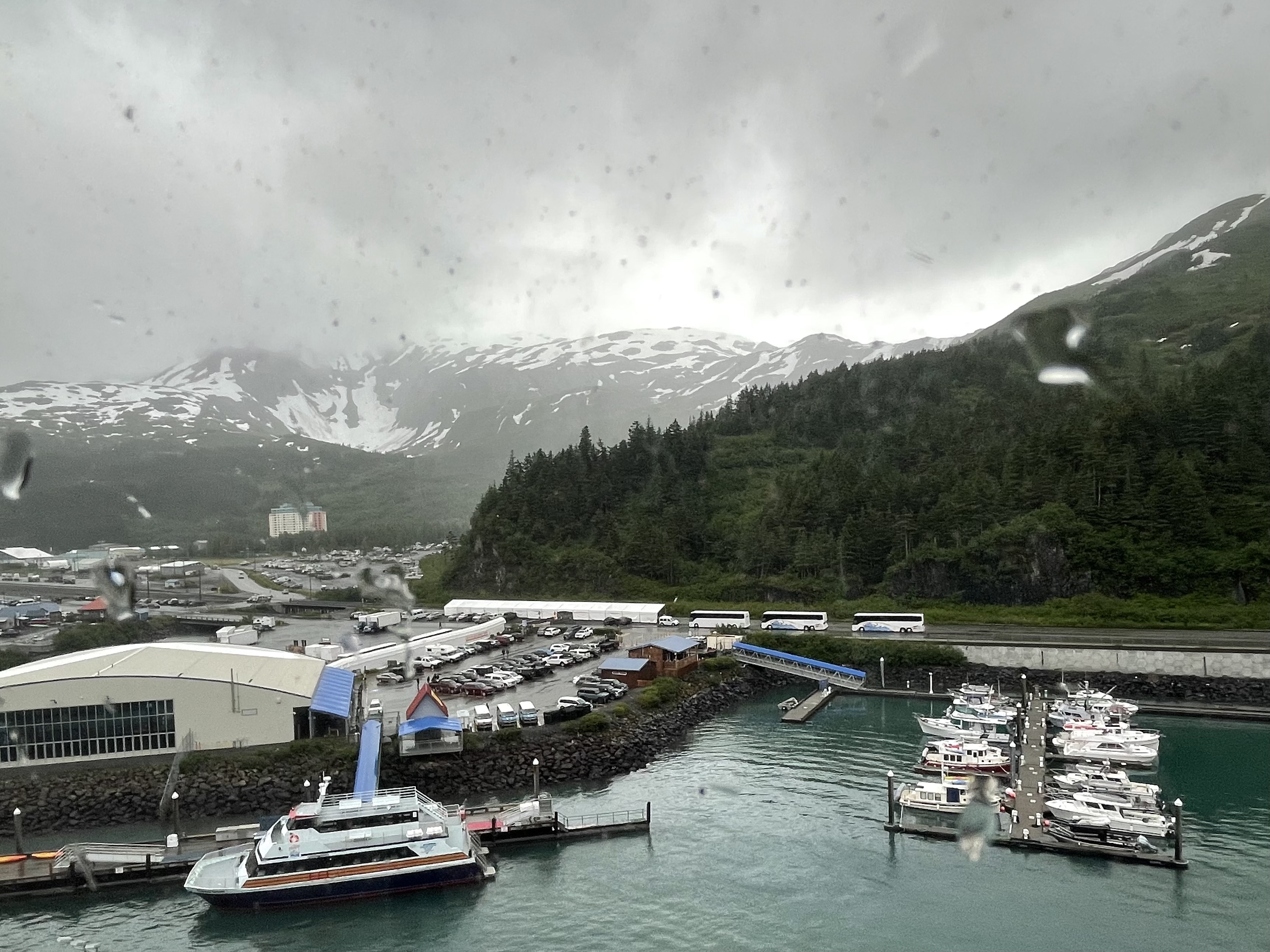
Whittier, Alaska. Trains load and off-load passengers in the white tented area across from the cruise ship terminal and the marina.

The Whittier HAP Depot is an Alaska Railroad passenger stop in Whittier, Alaska. The passenger stop is located along a siding in Whittier, immediately west of the railroad bridge crossing Whittier Creek at Alaska Railroad milepost 1.2. Although the railroad does not have a formal station building in Whittier, Glacier Discovery trains stop at this point across the street from the Holland America Line and Princess Cruises cruise-ship terminal in the city. Additional Alaska Railroad and Tour Alaska passenger trains, all operated by Alaska Railroad under charter to HAP Alaska-Yukon exclusively for passengers of Holland America Line and Princess Cruises, also stop at this point.

An additional Alaska Railroad passenger stop, the Whittier NCL Depot, will be placed in service in 2025 along a separate yard track, immediately north of the staging area outside the east portal of the Anton Anderson Memorial Tunnel. Alaska Railroad passenger trains, operated by Alaska Railroad under charter to NCL Holdings for passengers of Norwegian Cruise Lines and its corporate affiliates, will stop at this point.

The Whittier "station," or timepoint used by the Alaska Railroad for its rail operations, is at milepost 2.5, located immediately east of the east portal of the Anton Anderson Memorial Tunnel, and west of the yard track leading to the Whittier NCL Depot. Passenger trains do not stop at this "station."
