= Petaluma Downtown station =

Railway station in California

Petaluma Downtown
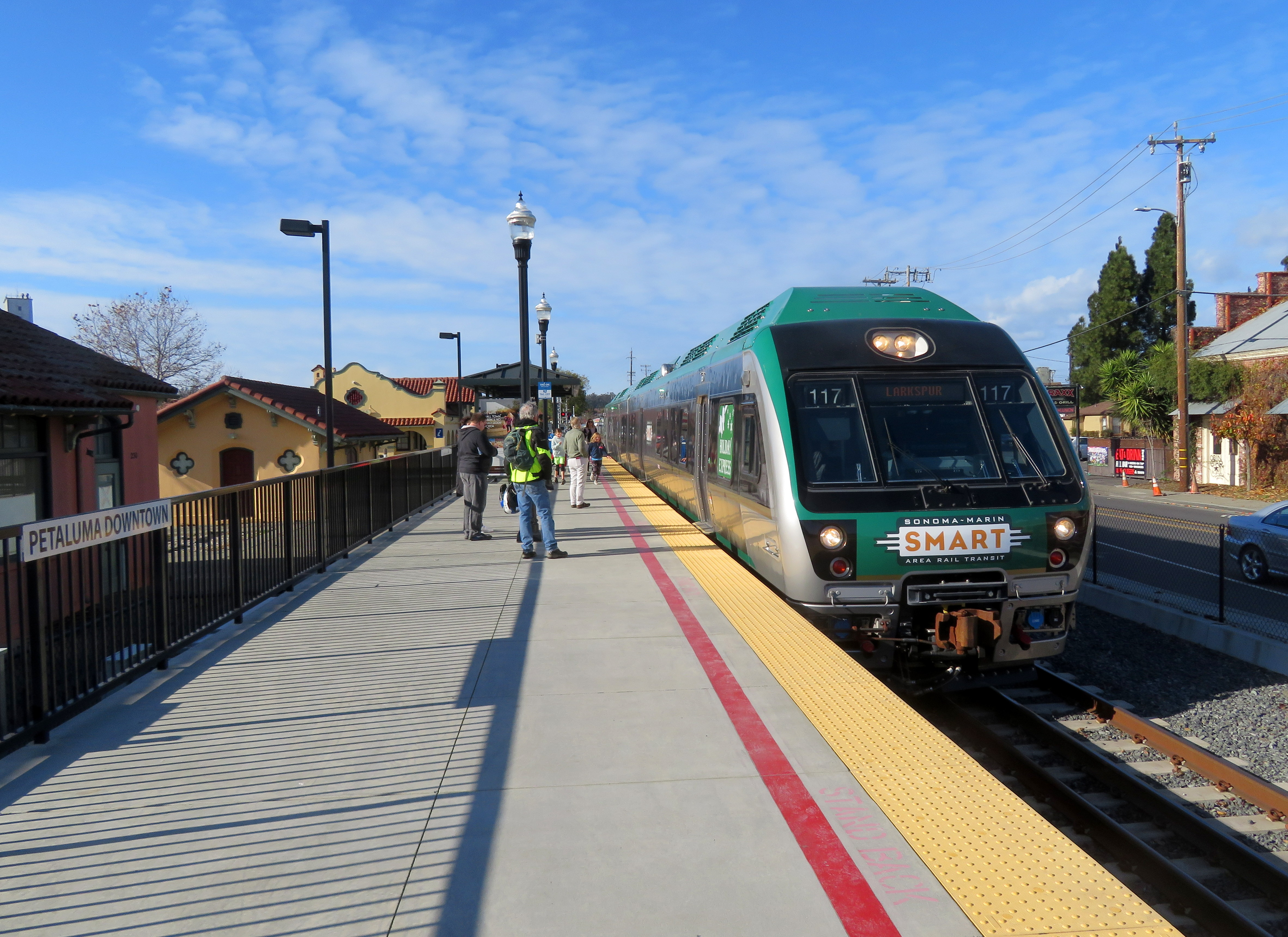
- A southbound train at Petaluma Downtown station in 2019

General information
- Location: 220 Lakeville Street; Petaluma, California; United States
- Coordinates: 38°14′15″N 122°38′06″W
- Elevation: 14.8 ft (4.5 m)
- Line: SMART Mainline Subdivision
- Platforms: 1 side platform
- Tracks: 1 (with gauntlet track)
- Connections: Sonoma County Transit; Petaluma Transit

Construction
- Parking: 50 spaces
- Cycle facilities: 13 racks 12 secure spaces
- Accessible: Yes

Other information
- Station code: SMART: PET
- Fare zone: 3

History
- Opened: 1914 (NWP); June 29, 2017 (SMART preview); August 25, 2017 (full service)
- Closed: c. 1958
- Former names: Petaluma

Services
Preceding station	SMART	Following station
Petaluma North toward Windsor	SMART	Novato San Marin toward Larkspur
Former services
Preceding station	Northwestern Pacific Railroad	Following station
Cotati toward Eureka	Main Line	Novato toward Sausalito
Location

Petaluma Downtown station is a Sonoma–Marin Area Rail Transit station in Petaluma. It opened to preview service on June 29, 2017; full commuter service commenced on August 25, 2017. A new platform and facilities were constructed adjacent to the historic Northwestern Pacific Railroad station building, which opened in 1914. It is the system's first station to open in the city, with Petaluma North station set to open later.
