= Petaluma North station =

Railway station in Petaluma, California

Petaluma North
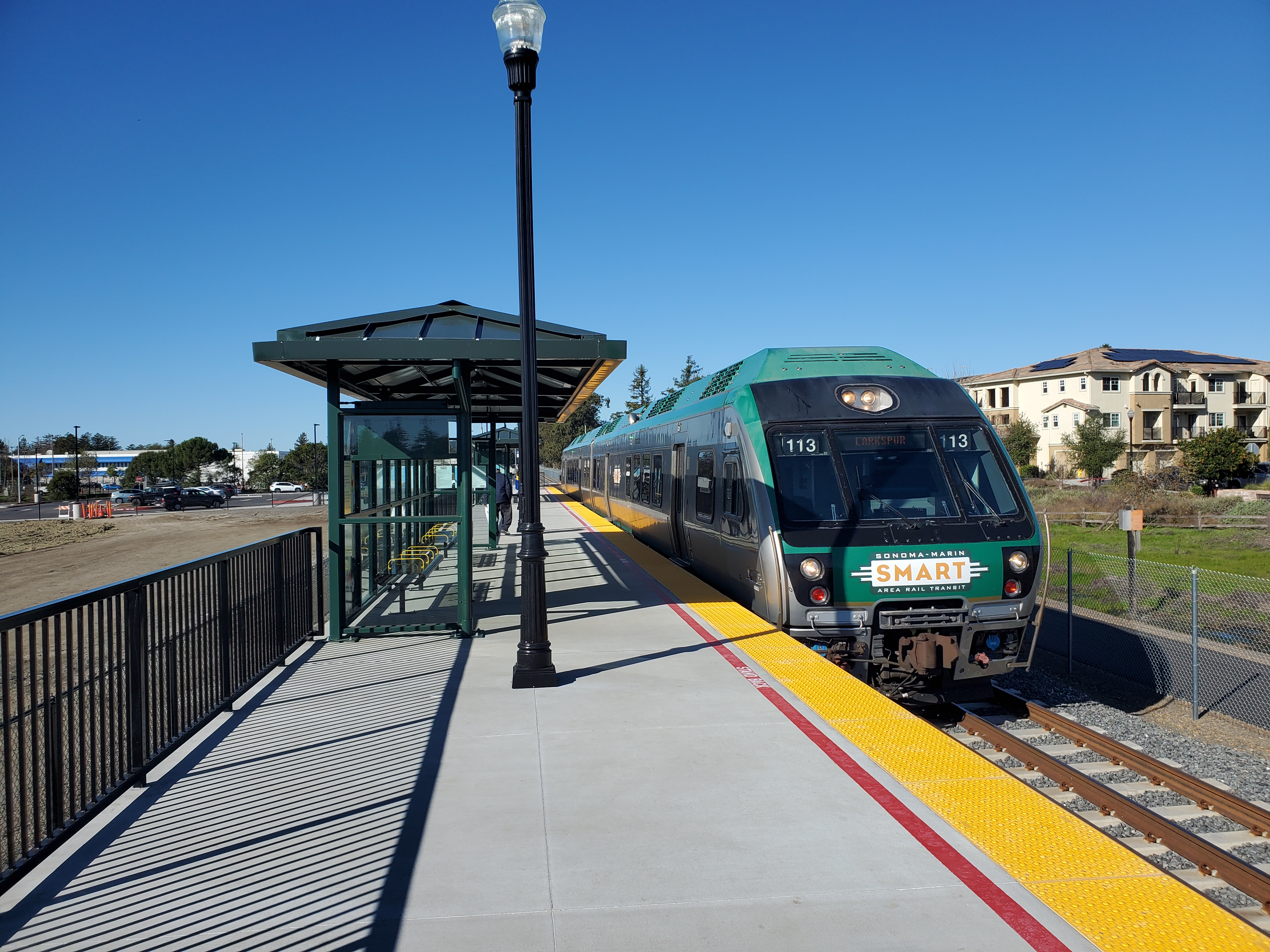
- A southbound train at the station in January 2025

General information
- Location: 320 Corona Road; Petaluma, California; United States
- Coordinates: 38.267786°N 122.655857°W
- Line: SMART Mainline Subdivision
- Platforms: 1 side platform
- Tracks: 1
- Connections: Sonoma County Transit; Petaluma Transit

Other information
- Station code: SMART: PEN

History
- Opened: January 10, 2025

Services
Preceding station	SMART	Following station
Cotati toward Windsor	SMART	Petaluma Downtown toward Larkspur
Location

Petaluma North station is a Sonoma–Marin Area Rail Transit station located at Corona Road and North McDowell Boulevard in Petaluma, California. It opened as an infill station on January 10, 2025.

== History ==
The station was planned as an infill station to be constructed after the initial phase of the system had been completed. SMART estimated construction costs for the station at $11 million in 2019. In June 2020, the SMART Board of Directors authorized $8 million from the sale of a district-owned property to be used for design and construction of the station. However, in January 2021, the Petaluma City Council rejected a housing development tied to the station project, placing the station's future in doubt.

In July 2022, the city won a $10 million state grant for construction of the station. The city and the Sonoma County Transportation Authority each contributed $2 million for the station's construction, bringing the construction budget to $14 million. Construction of the station and pathway started in November 2023 with completion scheduled for late 2024. The station opened on January 10, 2025.
