= List of Sonoma–Marin Area Rail Transit stations =

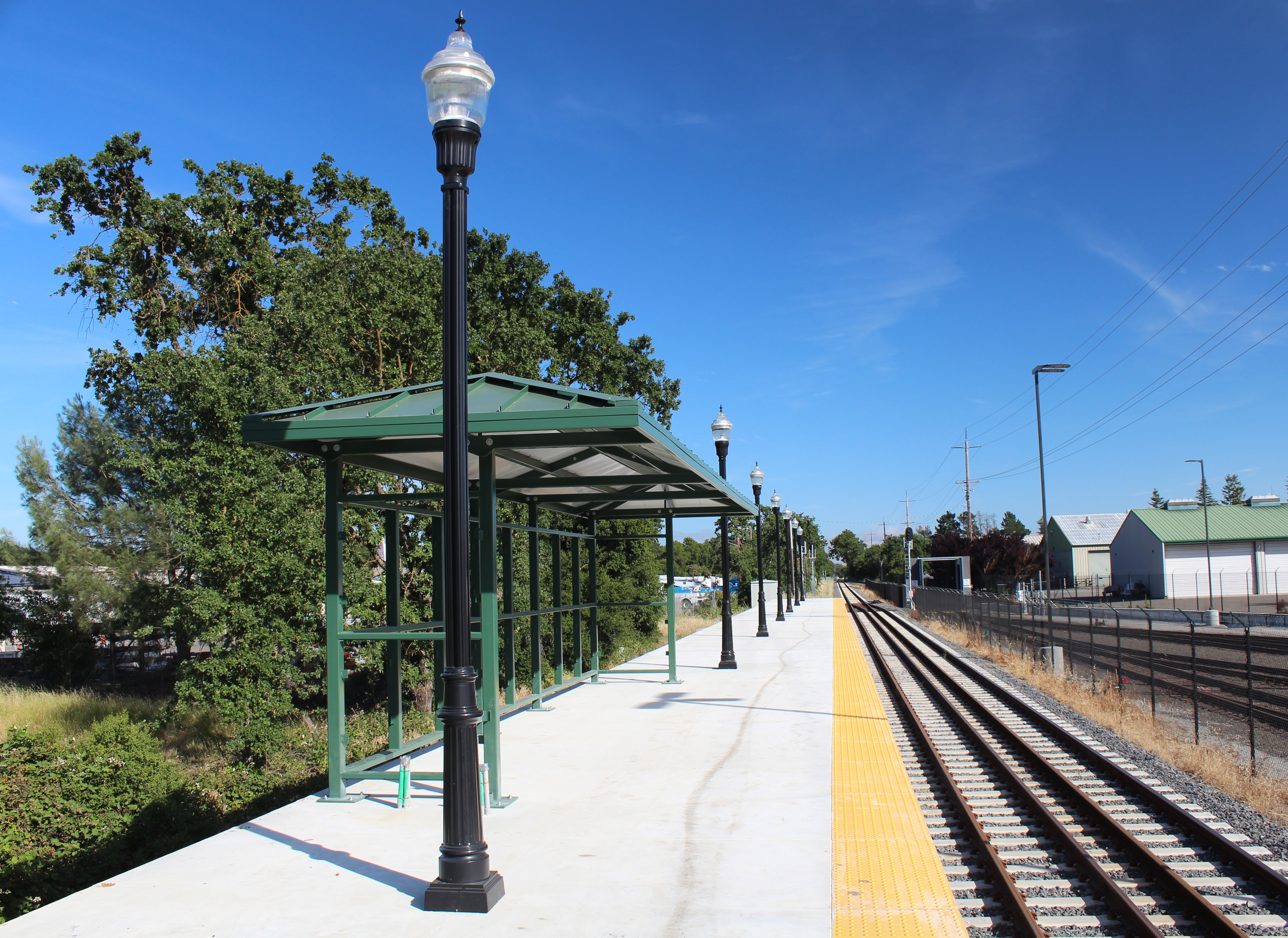
Sonoma County Airport station, featuring a gauntlet track

Sonoma–Marin Area Rail Transit, or SMART, is a commuter rail service in California's Sonoma and Marin counties. As of June 2025, the line serves 14 stations, with 2 more stations planned to open after further construction.

The main line was built primarily by the Northwestern Pacific Railroad and received regular service until 1958 when passenger trains were discontinued south of Willits. After the decline in railway traffic in the post-WWII years, the line was eventually closed to all rail activity. The right-of-way was acquired by a special-purpose district and reopened to freight movements in 2011 and passenger service on August 25, 2017.

Station platforms are 300 feet (91 m) in length (the sole exception is San Rafael's 285-foot (87 m) northbound platform) and are high-level to provide accessible boarding. Gauntlet tracks are installed at stations north of Ignacio to allow freight trains to pass with proper clearance. Novato Downtown, San Rafael, and Santa Rosa Downtown stations are adjacent to former NWP station buildings (as will be Healdsburg), but the buildings are used for other purposes.

== Stations ==
County	Location	Station	Connections	Service began	Parking spaces	Image
Sonoma	Windsor	Windsor†	Sonoma County Transit	May 31, 2025	[data missing]	A train at Windsor station, 2025
Sonoma	Mark West	Sonoma County Airport	Sonoma County Transit; Shuttle to Sonoma County Airport	August 25, 2017^{[b]}	50	Sonoma County Airport station in 2016, featuring a gauntlet track
Sonoma	Santa Rosa	Santa Rosa North	CityBus; Sonoma County Transit	August 25, 2017^{[b]}	0	A northbound train at Santa Rosa North station, 2018
Sonoma	Santa Rosa	Santa Rosa Downtown	MTA; CityBus; Sonoma County Transit	August 25, 2017^{[b]}	0	A northbound train at Santa Rosa Downtown station, 2018
Sonoma	Rohnert Park	Rohnert Park	Sonoma County Transit	August 25, 2017^{[a]}	n/a	The platform at Rohnert Park station, 2018
Sonoma	Cotati	Cotati	Sonoma County Transit	August 25, 2017^{[a]}	n/a	The platforms at Cotati station, 2018
Sonoma	Petaluma	Petaluma North	Sonoma County Transit; Petaluma Transit	January 10, 2025	[data missing]	A southbound train at Petaluma North station, 2025
Sonoma	Petaluma	Petaluma Downtown	Sonoma County Transit; Petaluma Transit	August 25, 2017^{[a]}	50	A southbound train at Petaluma Downtown station, 2019
Marin	Novato	Novato San Marin	GGT; Marin Transit	August 25, 2017^{[a]}	45	A northbound train at Novato San Marin station, 2018
Marin	Novato	Novato Downtown	GGT	December 14, 2019	0	A southbound train at Novato Downtown station, 2019
Marin	Novato	Novato Hamilton		August 25, 2017^{[a]}	115	A view of Novato Hamilton station from Main Gate Road, 2018
Marin	San Rafael	Marin Civic Center	Marin Transit	August 25, 2017^{[a]}	^{[d]}	A northbound train at Marin Civic Center station, 2018
Marin	San Rafael	San Rafael	GGT; Marin Airporter; Marin Transit; Sonoma County Transit; Greyhound Lines	August 25, 2017^{[c]}	0	The platforms at San Rafael Transit Center, 2018
Marin	Larkspur	Larkspur†	Marin Transit; Larkspur Landing	December 14, 2019	n/a	The first revenue train at Larkspur station in December 2019

†	Line termini

Notes
^{a} Station opened to limited preview service on June 29, 2017.
^{b} Station opened to limited preview service on July 1, 2017.
^{c} Station opened to limited preview service on July 8, 2017.
^{d} Free street parking

== Future stations ==
Station	Projected opening	Municipality	County	Status / Notes
Cloverdale†	—	Cloverdale	Sonoma	Eventual northern terminus of system
Geyserville	—	Geyserville	Sonoma	
Healdsburg	2028	Healdsburg	Sonoma	

Suggestions have been put forward to eventually expand to Napa or Solano counties with connections at Suisun–Fairfield station, or north along the Northwestern Pacific right of way to Ukiah or Willits in Mendocino.
