= Downtown station =

Downtown station may refer to:

- Downtown station (Capital MetroRail), a station on the Capital MetroRail of Austin, Texas
- Kuloloia station, also known as Downtown station, a planned Skyline light metro station in Honolulu, Hawaiʻi
- Downtown MRT station, a station on the Downtown MRT line of the Mass Rapid Transit system in Singapore

== Other uses/variations ==
=== Canada ===
==== Alberta ====
- Downtown West–Kerby station, a Calgary C-Train station

=== United States ===
==== Alabama ====
- Downtown Chevron Station, a historic service station in Huntsville

==== California ====
- Azusa Downtown station, a station on the A Line of the Los Angeles Metro Rail
- Downtown Berkeley station, a BART station
- Downtown Burbank station, a Metrolink and Amtrak station in Burbank
- Downtown Campbell station, a VTA light rail station in Campbell
- Downtown Inglewood station, a station on the K Line of the Los Angeles Metro Rail
- Downtown Long Beach station, a station on the A Line of the Los Angeles Metro Rail
- Mountain View station (California), also known as Downtown Mountain View station, a Caltrain and VTA light rail station in Mountain View
- Downtown San José station, a future BART station
- Downtown Santa Monica station, a station on the E Line of the Los Angeles Metro Rail
- Novato Downtown station, a Sonoma–Marin Area Rail Transit (SMART) station in Novato
- Perris–Downtown station, a Metrolink station in Perris
- Petaluma Downtown station, a Sonoma–Marin Area Rail Transit (SMART) station in Petaluma
- Pomona–Downtown station, a Metrolink and Amtrak station in Pomona
- Redlands–Downtown station, an Arrow station in San Bernardino
- Riverside–Downtown station, a Metrolink and Amtrak station in Riverside
- San Bernardino Downtown Station, a post office in San Bernardino
- San Bernardino-Downtown station, an Arrow station in San Bernardino
- Santa Rosa Downtown station a Sonoma–Marin Area Rail Transit (SMART) station in Santa Rosa
- Stockton – Downtown station, an Altamont Corridor Express (ACE) and Amtrak station in Stockton

==== Colorado ====
- Littleton–Downtown station, an RTD light rail station in Littleton

==== Connecticut ====
- Downtown New Britain station, a CTfastrak bus rapid transit station in New Britain

==== Maryland ====
- Downtown Largo station, a station served by Washington Metro's Silver and Blue lines

==== Massachusetts ====
- Downtown Crossing station, a station served by the Red, Orange, and Silver lines of the MBTA in Boston

==== New Mexico ====
- Downtown Bernalillo station, a New Mexico Rail Runner Express station in Bernalillo

==== Texas ====
- Downtown Carrollton station a DART light rail station in Carrollton
- Downtown Garland station, a DART light rail station in Garland
- Downtown Irving/Heritage Crossing station, a Trinity Railway Express station in Irving
- Downtown Plano station, a DART light rail station in Plano
- Downtown Rowlett station, a DART light rail station in Rowlett

==== Washington ====
- Bellevue Downtown station, a Link light rail station in Bellevue
- Downtown Redmond station, a future Link light rail station in Redmond
- Federal Way Downtown station, a bus station in Federal Way
