= Santa Rosa North station =

Santa Rosa North
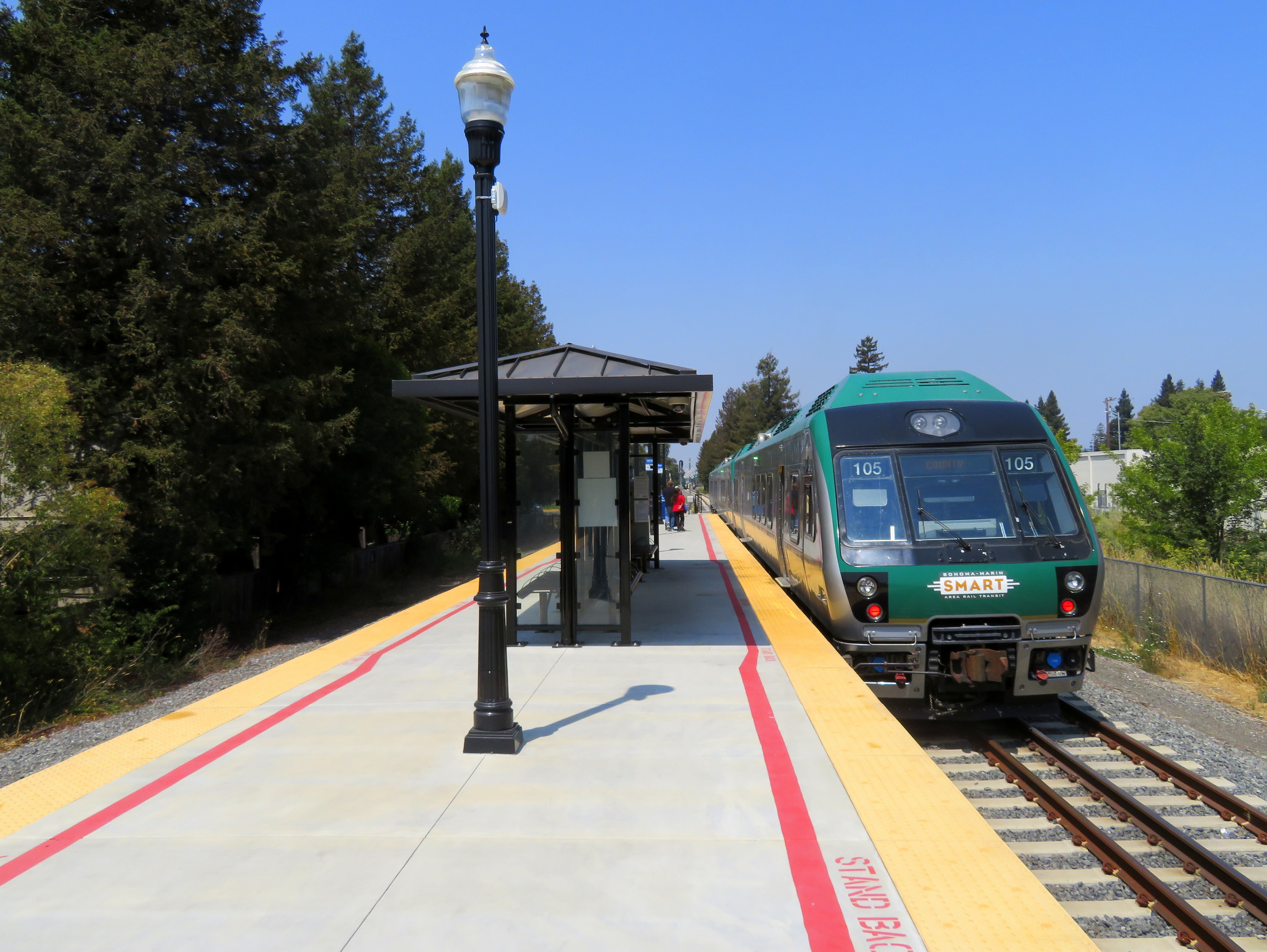
- A northbound train at Santa Rosa North station in 2018

General information
- Location: 1500 Guerneville Road; Santa Rosa, California; United States
- Coordinates: 38°27′19″N 122°44′11″W
- Line: SMART Mainline Subdivision
- Platforms: 1 island platform
- Tracks: 2 (1 gauntlet track)
- Connections: Santa Rosa CityBus; Sonoma County Transit

Other information
- Station code: SMART: SRN
- Fare zone: 4

History
- Opened: July 1, 2017 (preview service); August 25, 2017 (full service)

Services
Preceding station	SMART	Following station
Sonoma County Airport toward Windsor	SMART	Santa Rosa Downtown toward Larkspur
Location

Santa Rosa North station (known as Santa Rosa–Guerneville Road during planning) is a Sonoma–Marin Area Rail Transit train station in Santa Rosa. It opened to preview service on July 1, 2017; full commuter service commenced on August 25, 2017. The station is located on Guerneville Road 0.3 miles (0.5 km) west of the Coddingtown Mall.

The station closed October 28–31, 2019 due to the loss of power at crossings due to shutoffs.
