= 2028 in rail transport =

This article lists events related to rail transport that are currently scheduled to occur in 2028. Please be aware that the actual dates on which these events occur may differ substantially from what is shown here.

== Events ==
=== January ===
- (Malaysia) – Gombak to Port Klang section on the MRL East Coast Rail Link is scheduled to open.

=== March ===
- (Colombia) – Line 1 of the Bogotá Metro is scheduled to open between Calle 72 and Gibraltar.

=== May ===
- (Thailand) – Orange Line of the Bangkok MRT is scheduled to open between Bang Khun Non and Pracha Songkhro.

=== June ===
- (Italy) (Germany) 11 June – Trenitalia launches passenger trains from Naples to Berlin.
- (Germany) (Denmark) (Sweden) (Norway) – A twice daily passenger train is introduced between Berlin, Copenhagen, Malmö, Gothenburg, and Oslo, operated in cooperation by Deutsche Bahn, DSB, and Vy, using ICE L trainsets.
- (Romania) (Moldova) – Iași-Ungheni railway is electrified.

=== December ===
- – TRIPP railway & highway route connecting Azerbaijan and its Nakhchivan region through Armenia.
- (Czech Republic) – Arriva introduces new passenger service from Prague to Cheb and Klatovy.
- (Germany) – Mainschleifenbahn introduces regional service between Würzburg, Rottendorf, Seligenstadt and Volkach.

=== Unknown date ===
- (Australia) – Canberra light rail extends to Commonwealth Park from Alinga Street.
- (Azerbaijan) (Iran) – Astara–Rasht–Qazvin railway is scheduled to open.
- (Brazil) – Line 2 of the São Paulo Metro is scheduled to open between Vila Formosa and Penha-Lojas Besni.
- (Bulgaria) (North Macedonia) – A cross-border tunnel opens between Gyueshevo and Kriva Palanka.
- (Canada) – Valley Line of the Edmonton Light Rail extends to Lewis Farms from Mill Woods.
- (China) – after launching Second Chengdu–Chongqing high-speed railway, 400 km/h service to be started.
- (China) – Chongqing Rail Transit: Line 7 is scheduled to open between Kexuecheng and Jinfeng; Line 17 is scheduled to open between Shijiayuanzi and Daxuecheng.
- (China) – Line 10 of the Suzhou Metro is scheduled to open between Jingang and Suzhou North Railway Station.
- (China) – Line 4 of the Xiamen Metro extends to Maluanwan South from Xiang'an Airport.
- (China) – Zhangzhou-Shantou high-speed railway is scheduled to open between Zhangzhou and Shantou.
- (Chile) – Line 4 of the Santiago Metro extends to Bajoa from Plaza De Puente Alto.
- (Chile) – Line 6 of the Santiago Metro extends to Isidora Goyenecha from Los Leones.
- (Chile) – Line 7 of the Santiago Metro is scheduled to open between Brasil and Estoril.
- (Colombia) – RegioTram of Bogotá is scheduled to open between Fontibón and Bogotá.
- (Czech Republic) – Lines 15 and 16 of the Prague tramway network extend to Malešice; line 17 extends to the right bank of the Vlatava River in the southern suburbs of Nové Dvorý and Libuš.
- (Ivory Coast) – Abidjan Metro is scheduled to open between Anyama Centre and Aérocité.
- (Egypt) – Line 4 of the Cairo Metro is scheduled to open between Haram District and New Cairo District.
- (Estonia) – Tallinn-Parnu Section of Rail Baltica is scheduled to open between Tallinn and Parnu.
- – Line T13 of the Ile De France Tramway Network extends to Achères-Ville from Saint-Germain-en-Laye.
- (France) – Line 16 of the Paris Metro opens between Saint-Denis–Pleyel and Parc du Blanc-Mesnil.
- (France) – Line 17 of the Paris Metro opens between Saint-Denis–Pleyel and Le Bourget - Aéroport.
- (France) – Line C of the Toulouse Metro is scheduled to open between Colomiers Gare and Labège Gare.
- (France) – Line 2 of the Tours Tramway Network is scheduled to open between La Riche and Saint-Pierre-Des-Corps.
- (Finland) – Line 1 of the Tampere Tramway Network extends to Niihama from Kauppi; as well as to Partola from Sorin Aukio.
- (Germany) – Line 4 of the Bielefeld Stadtbahn extends to Schloßhofstraße from Lohmannshof.
- (India) – Line 10 of the Mumbai Metro is scheduled to open between Shivaji Chowk and Chhatrapati Shivaji Maharaj Terminus.
- (Indonesia) – South Line of the Jakarta LRT extends to Dukuh Atas from Manggarai.
- (Indonesia) – South Line of the Jakarta LRT extends to Pesing from Dukuh Atas.
- (Indonesia) – N-S Line of the Jakarta MRT extends to Kota from Bundaran HI.
- (Lithuania) – Kaunas-Panevezys Section of Rail Baltica is scheduled to open between Kaunas and Panevezys.
- – Line T1 of the Luxembourg Tramway Network extends to Laangfur from Pont Grande-Duchesse Charlotte-Pfaffenthal.
- – Line T1 of the Luxembourg Tramway Network extends to Leudellange from Laangfur.
- (Netherlands) – Nijmegen–Venlo railway is electrified.
- (Peru) – Line 2 of the Lima Metro is scheduled to open between Puerto del Callao and Municipalidad de Ate.
- (Philippines) – The North–South Commuter Railway of the Philippine National Railways is scheduled to open with the first segment between Valenzuela and Malolos. The event marks the revival of the railway system in the province of Bulacan after more than 40 years.
- (Portugal) – Route 16 of Lisbon tram network is scheduled to open between Terreiro do Paço and Parque Tejo.
- (Russia) – Arbatsko-Pokrovskaya line of the Moscow Metro is extended to Golyanovo from Shchyolkovskaya.
- – Jurong Region Line of the Singapore MRT extends to Pandan Reservoir from Tengah.
- (Spain) – TramCamp is scheduled to open from Cambrils to Vila-seca.
- (Spain) – Trambaix Line of the Barcelona Tramway Network extends to Francesc Macià from Verdaguer.
- (Spain) – Line 5 of the Madrid Metro extends to Barajas Airport from Alameda de Osuna.
- (South Korea) – Line 9 of the Seoul Subway extends to Godeok from VHS Medical Center.
- (Sweden) – Green Line of the Stockholm Metro extends to Arenastaden from Odenplan.
- (Taiwan) – Sanying Line of the New Taipei Metro extends to Danan from Yingtao Fude.
- (Taiwan) – Wanda–Shulin Line of the Taipei Metro extends to Huilong from Jugaung.
- (Turkey) – Istanbul Metro M1A extends to Kirazlı from Halkalı Üniversite.
- (Turkey) – Istanbul Metro M7 extends to Kabataş from Yıldız.
- (Turkey) – Istanbul Metro M7 extends to Mahmutbey from Hastane.
- (Turkey) – Trabzon Tram opens between Trabzon Meydani and Sehir Hastanesi.
- (United States) – Caltrain extends to Salinas from Gilroy as part of the Monterey County Rail Extension.
- (United States) – Dreamstar Lines introduces nightly inter-city service between Los Angeles and San Francisco.
- (United States) – Sonoma–Marin Area Rail Transit extends to Healdsburg from Windsor.
