= Sonoma County Airport station =

Train station in Santa Rosa, California, U.S.

Sonoma County Airport
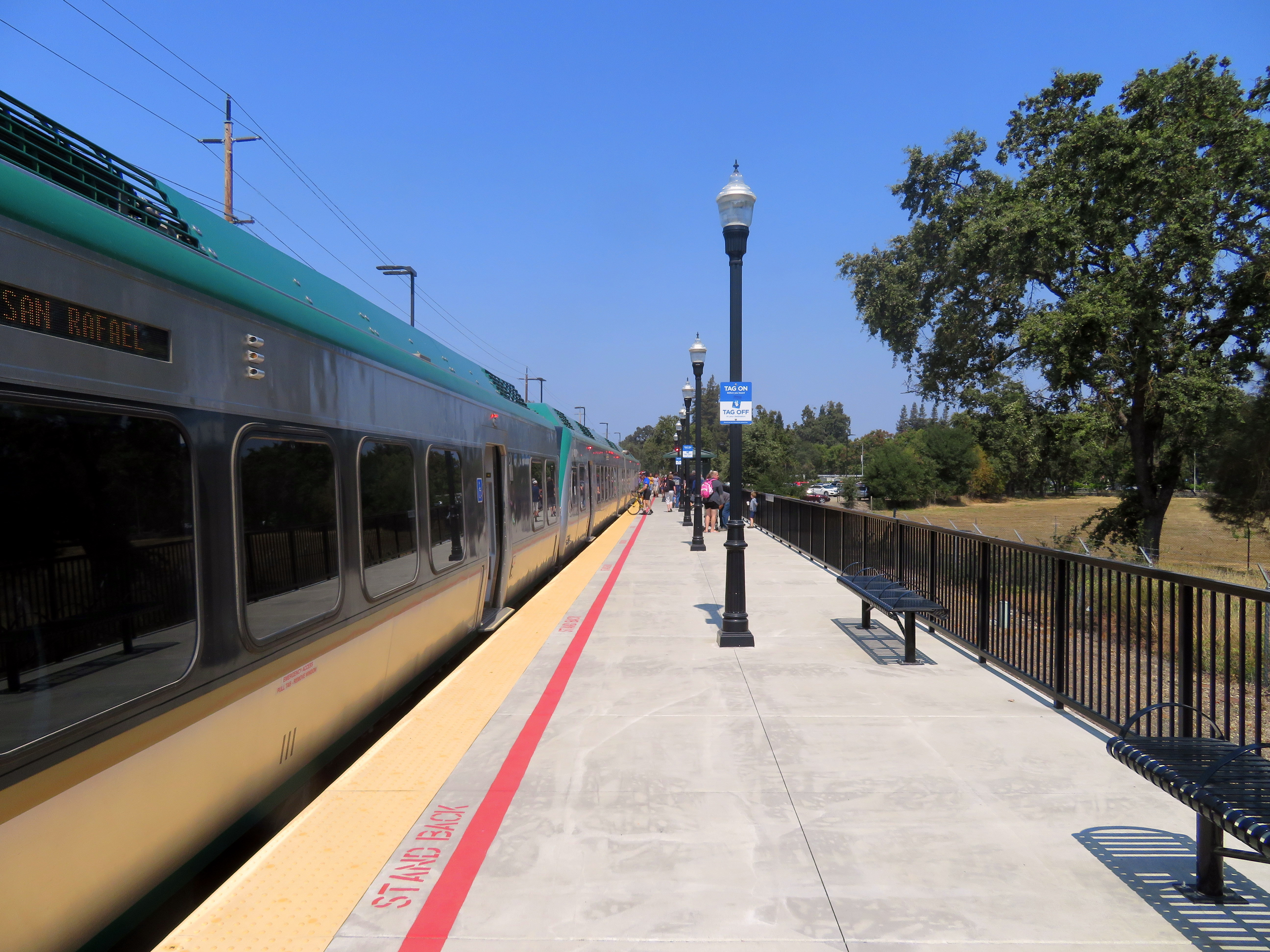
- A train at Sonoma County Airport station in 2018

General information
- Location: 1130 Airport Boulevard; Santa Rosa, California; United States
- Coordinates: 38°30′36″N 122°47′03″W
- Line: SMART Mainline Subdivision
- Platforms: 1 side platform
- Tracks: 1 (with gauntlet)
- Connections: SMART Connect; Sonoma County Transit: 62

Construction
- Parking: 50 spaces (planned)
- Accessible: Yes

Other information
- Station code: SMART: SCA
- Fare zone: 5

History
- Opened: July 1, 2017 (preview service); August 25, 2017 (full service)

Services
Preceding station	SMART	Following station
Windsor Terminus	SMART	Santa Rosa North toward Larkspur
Location

Sonoma County Airport station is a Sonoma–Marin Area Rail Transit train station in Santa Rosa, 1.1 miles (1.8 km) east of Charles M. Schulz–Sonoma County Airport. It opened to preview service on July 1, 2017; full commuter service commenced on August 25, 2017. Phase 1 was originally to extend only to Santa Rosa North, but in 2013 the MTC approved the addition of the airport station adjacent to the SMART Operations and Maintenance Facility.

The station was closed between October 28 and 31, 2019 due to the loss of power at railway crossings as a result of the 2019 California power shutoffs.
