= Rohnert Park station =

Railway station in Rohnert Park, California

ROHNERT PARK
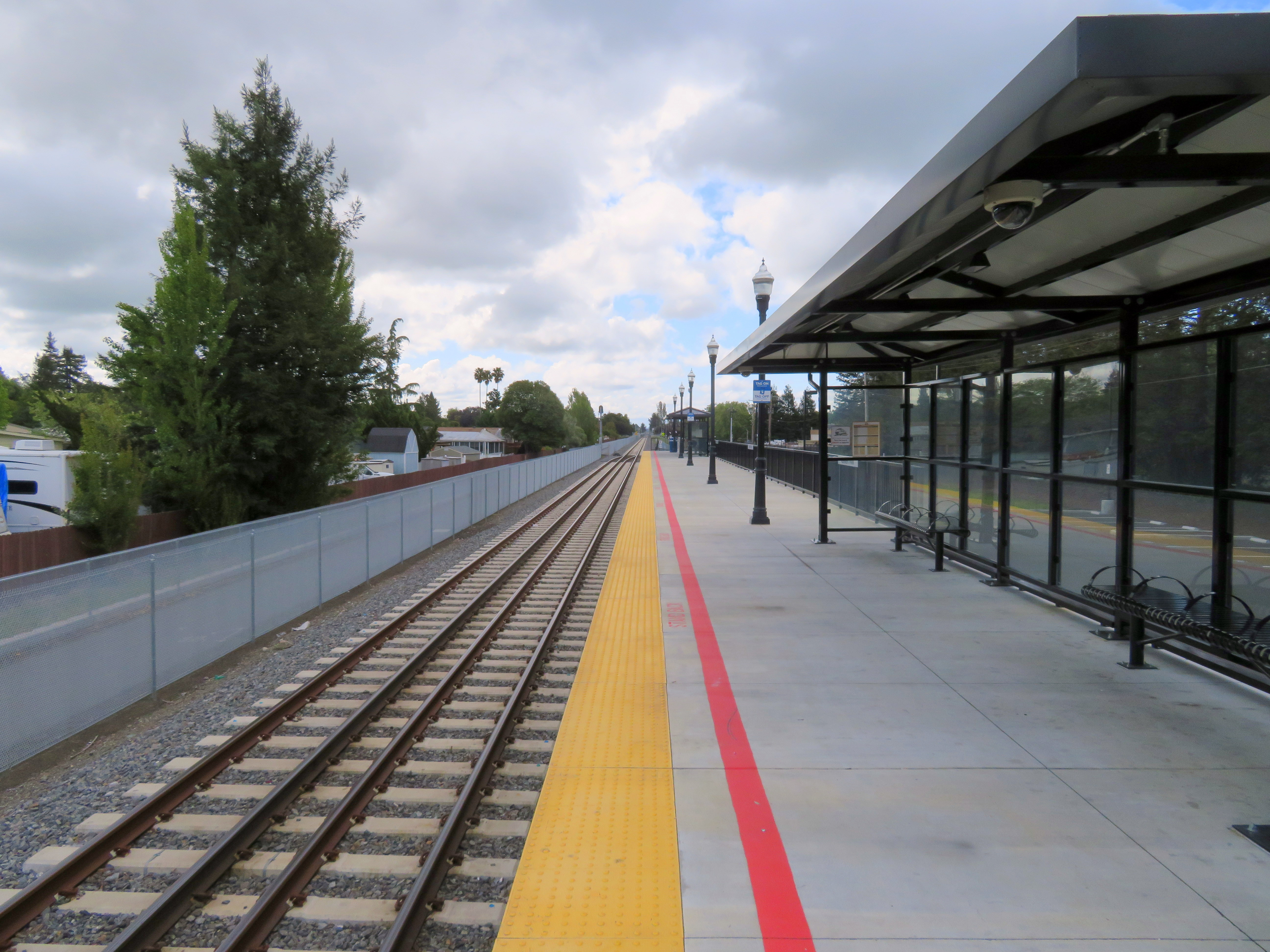
- Rohnert Park station in April 2018

General information
- Location: Rohnert Park Expressway; Rohnert Park, California; United States
- Coordinates: 38°20′50″N 122°42′04″W
- Elevation: 102.4 ft (31.2 m)
- Line: SMART Mainline Subdivision
- Platforms: 1 side
- Tracks: 1 (with gauntlet)
- Connections: Sonoma County Transit

Construction
- Accessible: yes

Other information
- Station code: SMART: RPK
- Fare zone: 3

History
- Opened: June 29, 2017 (preview service); August 25, 2017 (full service)

Services
Preceding station	SMART	Following station
Santa Rosa Downtown toward Windsor	SMART	Cotati toward Larkspur
Location

Rohnert Park station is a Sonoma–Marin Area Rail Transit station in Rohnert Park, California. It opened to preview service on June 29, 2017; full commuter service commenced on August 25, 2017. It is located on the Rohnert Park Expressway. The city's station was initially to be located further north near Golf Course Drive, but these plans were amended, resulting in the current location.
