= Novato San Marin station =

Railway station in California, US

Novato San Marin
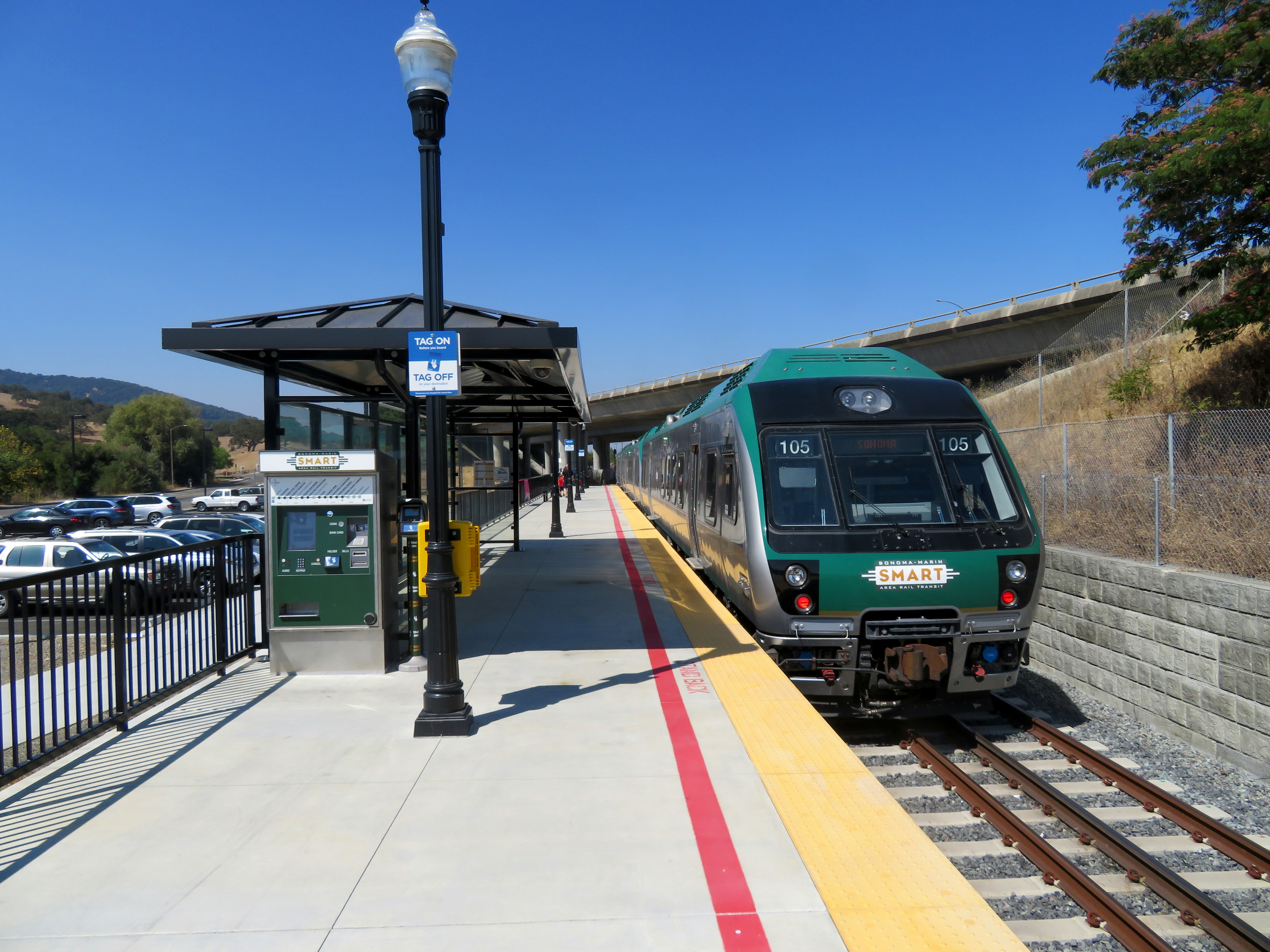
- A northbound train at Novato San Marin station in 2018

General information
- Location: 7700 Redwood Boulevard; Novato, California; United States
- Coordinates: 38°07′15″N 122°33′58″W
- Elevation: 8.2 ft (2.5 m)
- Line: SMART Mainline Subdivision
- Platforms: 1 side platform
- Tracks: 2
- Connections: 1 (with gauntlet)

Construction
- Parking: 45 spaces
- Cycle facilities: 8 spaces

Other information
- Station code: SMART: NSM
- Fare zone: 2

History
- Opened: June 29, 2017 (preview service); August 25, 2017 (full service)

Services
Preceding station	SMART	Following station
Petaluma Downtown toward Windsor	SMART	Novato Downtown toward Larkspur
Location

Novato San Marin is a Sonoma–Marin Area Rail Transit station in Novato, California. It opened to preview service on June 29, 2017; and full commuter service commenced on August 25, 2017. It is located on the north side of the city, near where San Marin Drive becomes Atherton Avenue at Redwood Boulevard. This was one of two stations planned for Novato in the Initial Operating Segment of SMART service until a third was announced to be partially built for opening at a later date.

This site was selected for its proximity to Fireman's Fund Insurance Company headquarters, then one of the largest employers in the county. In SMART's planning phase, the company pledged their employees would heavily patronize the line, but would go on to move corporate operations to Petaluma before the commencement of service.

Service to the station was planned to be reduced upon completion of the Novato Downtown station. However, full service to Novato San Marin was retained after Novato Downtown opened in December 2019.
