= Cotati station =

Rail station in Cotati, California, US

Cotati
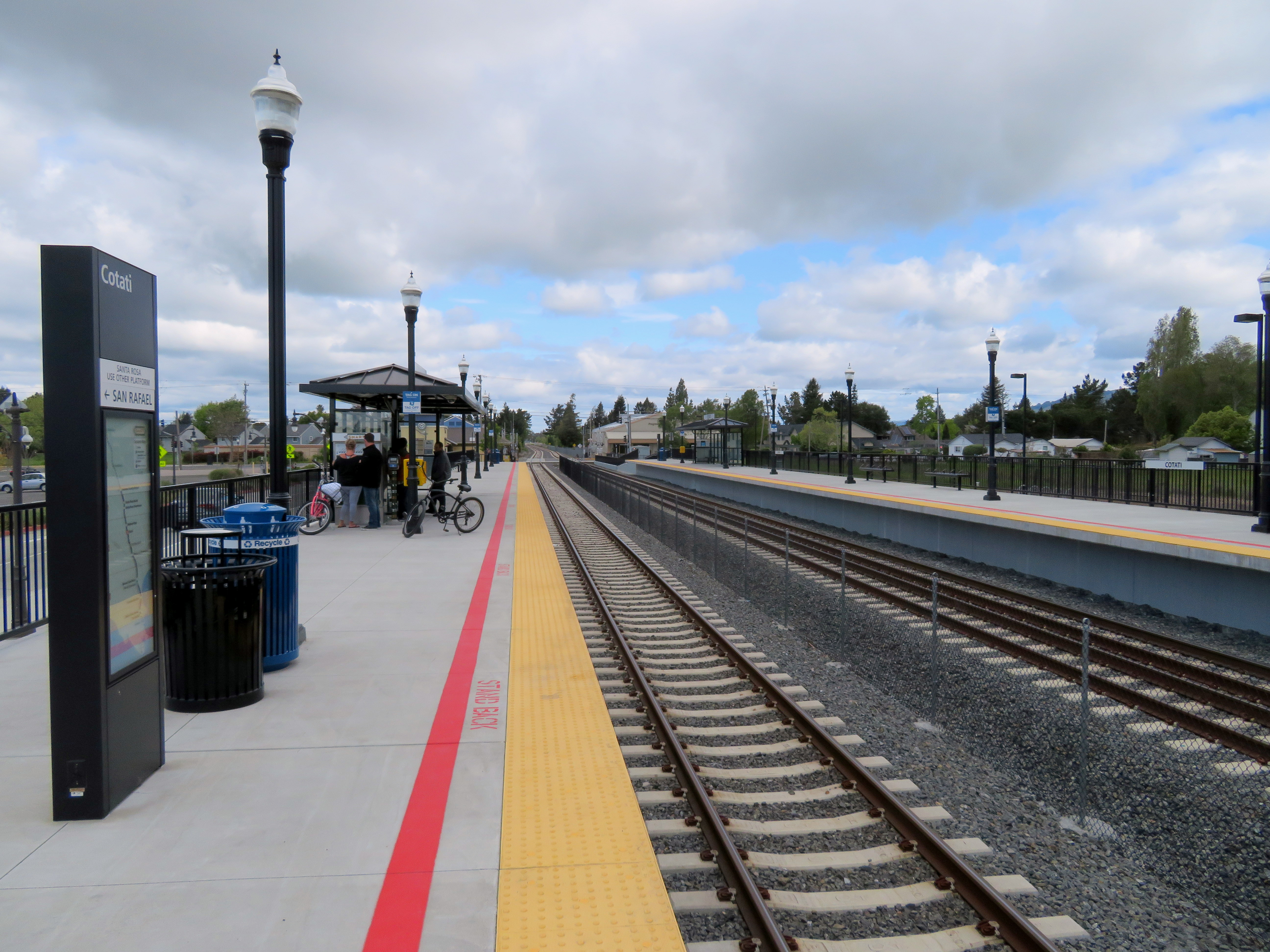
- Platforms at Cotati station in 2018

General information
- Location: 980 East Cotati Avenue; Cotati, California; United States
- Coordinates: 38°19′52″N 122°41′28″W
- Elevation: 114.8 ft (35.0 m)
- Line: SMART Mainline Subdivision
- Platforms: 2 side platforms
- Tracks: 2 (1 gauntlet track)
- Connections: Sonoma County Transit

Construction
- Accessible: Yes

Other information
- Station code: SMART: COT
- Fare zone: 3

History
- Opened: June 29, 2017 (preview service); August 25, 2017 (full service)

Services
Preceding station	SMART	Following station
Rohnert Park toward Windsor	SMART	Petaluma North toward Larkspur
Location

Cotati station is a Sonoma–Marin Area Rail Transit station in Cotati, California. It opened to preview service on June 29, 2017; full commuter service commenced on August 25, 2017. It is located on Cotati Avenue. The station building was constructed by the city independently of the transit authority. The station has parking, including an electric vehicle charging station.
