= Healdsburg station =

Rail station in Healdsburg, California, US

Healdsburg
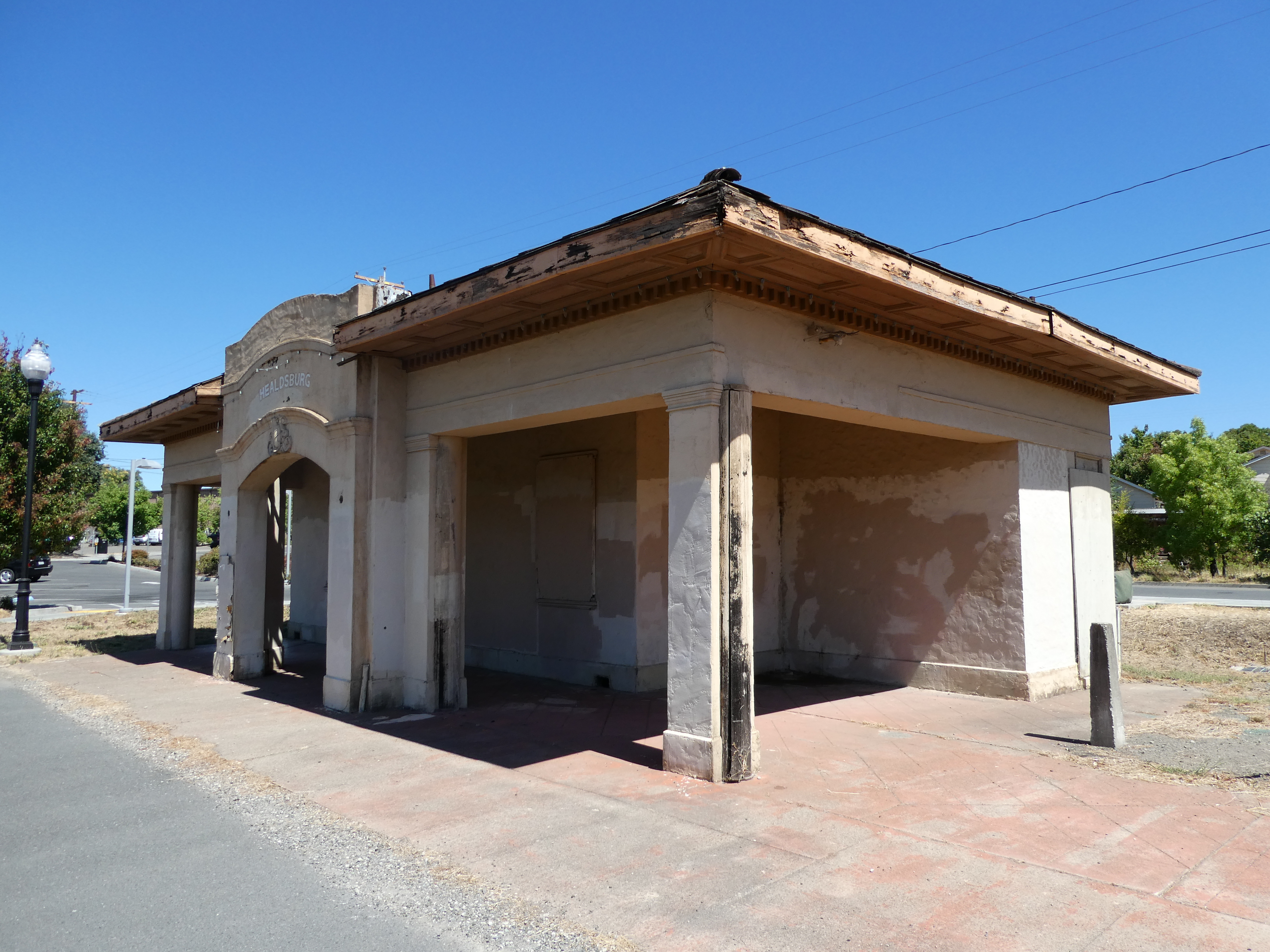
- The former Healdsburg station in 2022

General information
- Location: 300 Hudson Street; Healdsburg, California
- Coordinates: 38.6070°N 122.8655°W
- Bus operators: Sonoma County Transit

Construction
- Parking: 47 spaces

Other information
- Station code: SMART: HBG

History
- Opened: July 1871
- Opening: November 2028 (planned)
- Closed: November 10, 1958
- Rebuilt: c. 1891, 1928, 2011

Services
| Preceding station | SMART | Following station |
|---|---|---|
| Cloverdale Terminus | Future service | Windsor toward Larkspur |
Former services
| Preceding station | Northwestern Pacific Railroad | Following station |
|---|---|---|
| Geyserville toward Eureka | Main Line | Windsor toward Sausalito |
Location

Healdsburg station is a former Northwestern Pacific Railroad station in Healdsburg, California. Passenger service ended in 1958, and the city rebuilt the depot in 2011 in anticipation of Sonoma–Marin Area Rail Transit (SMART) service, which is planned to begin in December 2028. As of late 2026 the site of the future SMART station had not been finalized.

== History ==
=== Northwestern Pacific era ===
The railroad began serving Healdsburg in July 1871, and the station building was built around 1891. In 1928 the station was remodeled and a 1,008 square feet (93.6 m^{2}) "waiting room arcade" was built nearby. Passenger service ended after November 10, 1958. The city rebuilt the depot in 2011 in anticipation of future rail service.

=== SMART extension ===
In June 2023 SMART received a $30 million state grant, enough to complete its extension to Windsor and begin work toward Healdsburg. In February 2024 the Healdsburg City Council endorsed the historic depot as the site of the future station, and in October 2024 the California State Transportation Agency provided $81 million for the extension. SMART awarded a construction contract in September 2025.

Design work is expected to finish in December 2026, with construction from January 2027 through November 2028. Passenger service is planned to begin in December 2028. As of late 2026 SMART was again gathering public input on the station location.
