= Cotati, California =

City in California, United States

- City
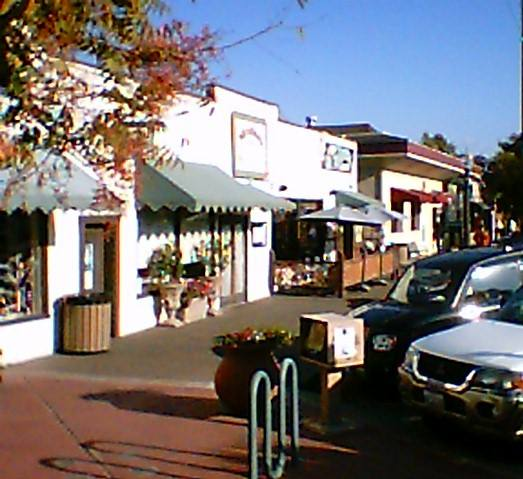
- Downtown Cotati

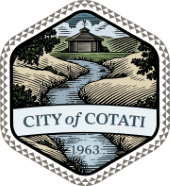
- Seal Logo
- Nickname: The Hub of Sonoma County
- Interactive map of Cotati, California
- Location in the United States
- Coordinates: 38°19′40″N 122°42′33″W
- Country: United States
- State: California
- County: Sonoma
- Incorporated: July 16, 1963
- Named for: Rancho Cotate

Government
  - Type: Council–manager
  - Mayor: Ben Ford
  - City manager: Damien O'Bid

Area
  - Total: 1.88 sq mi (4.86 km^{2})
  - Land: 1.87 sq mi (4.85 km^{2})
  - Water: 0.0039 sq mi (0.01 km^{2}) 0.17%
- Elevation: 112 ft (34 m)

Population (2020)
  - Total: 7,584
  - Density: 4,046.2/sq mi (1,562.23/km^{2})
- California Department of Finance estimate
- Demonym: Cotatian
- Time zone: UTC−8 (Pacific Time Zone)
  - Summer (DST): UTC−7 (PDT)
- ZIP codes: 94926–94928, 94931
- Area code: 707
- FIPS code: 06-16560
- GNIS feature IDs: 1655927, 2410240
- Website: www.cotaticity.gov

Cotati (/koʊˈtɑːtiː/, /kə-/; Miwok: Kota’ti) is a city in Sonoma County, California, United States, located approximately 45 mi (70 km) north of San Francisco in the 101 corridor between Rohnert Park and Petaluma. Cotati's population as of the 2020 Census was 7,584, making it the least populous incorporated community in Sonoma County.

Like the rest of Sonoma County, Cotati is included in both the San Francisco Bay Area and the North Coast. Located in the Sonoma Coast AVA, Cotati can also be considered part of Wine Country. E & J Gallo Winery operates a 400-acre (160 ha) vineyard called Two Rock Vineyard in the hills west of town. Cotati's hexagonal downtown plaza, one of only two hexagonal town layouts in the United States, is California Historical Landmark number 879. The other U.S. city with a hexagonal layout is Detroit, Michigan.

== History ==
The Coast Miwok civilization thrived in the Cotati area since at least 2000 BC, with principal villages built near major streams. Documented villages in the area included Lumen-takala (northeast of present-day Cotati), Payinecha (west of present-day Cotati), and Kotati.

In 1827, an Irishman named John Thomas Reed ventured into Miwok territory and built a cabin near Crane Creek. After the natives burned it, he retreated south to Mill Valley.

=== Rancho Cotate ===
In July 1844, the Mexican government granted Rancho Cotate (encompassing present-day towns of Cotati, Penngrove and Rohnert Park, and home to Coast Miwok people) to Captain Juan Castaneda, a Mexican military commander from Texas, in payment for his service as a soldier under General Vallejo. The grant took its name from the Coast Miwok village of Kotati. However, a legend arose that Rancho Cotate was named after a Pomo chief named Cotati, and in 1973 the state perpetuated this legend on the historical marker it placed in the plaza.

Rancho Cotate consisted of 17,238.6 acres (6,976.2 ha). Captain Castaneda moved to San Francisco and never developed Rancho Cotate. Because he failed to fulfill the legal requirements of the grant, he lost control of the rancho, which passed to Thomas Larkin and then to Joseph Ruckle. In 1849, Ruckle sold the land to Dr. Thomas Stokes Page, a former resident of Valparaíso, Chile, for $1,600. Rancho Cotate was recorded in California state records as follows:

Cotate #65, Sonoma Co., Grant of 4 sq. leagues made in 1844 by Gov. Micheltorena to Juan Casteneda. Confirmed in 1846. Patent for 17,238 acres (6,976 ha) issued in 1858 to Thos. S. Page. In T 5-6N, R 7-8W, MDM.

— California Ranchos: Patented Private Land Grants Listed by County, Shumway 1988:107.

With the cession of California to the United States following the Mexican-American War, the 1848 Treaty of Guadalupe Hidalgo provided that the land grants would be honored. As required by the Land Act of 1851, a claim for Rancho Cotati was filed with the Public Land Commission in 1852, and the grant was patented to Thomas Stokes Page, February 18, 1858, for 17,238.60 acres.

The landholding remained in the Page family for over eighty years. Subject to seasonal flooding from the Laguna de Santa Rosa, the land was used to graze cattle and sheep. In October 1870, the San Francisco and North Pacific Railroad completed the first railroad from Petaluma to Santa Rosa, and a town formed around the wood and water stop called Page's Station, then Cotati.

=== Development of a town ===
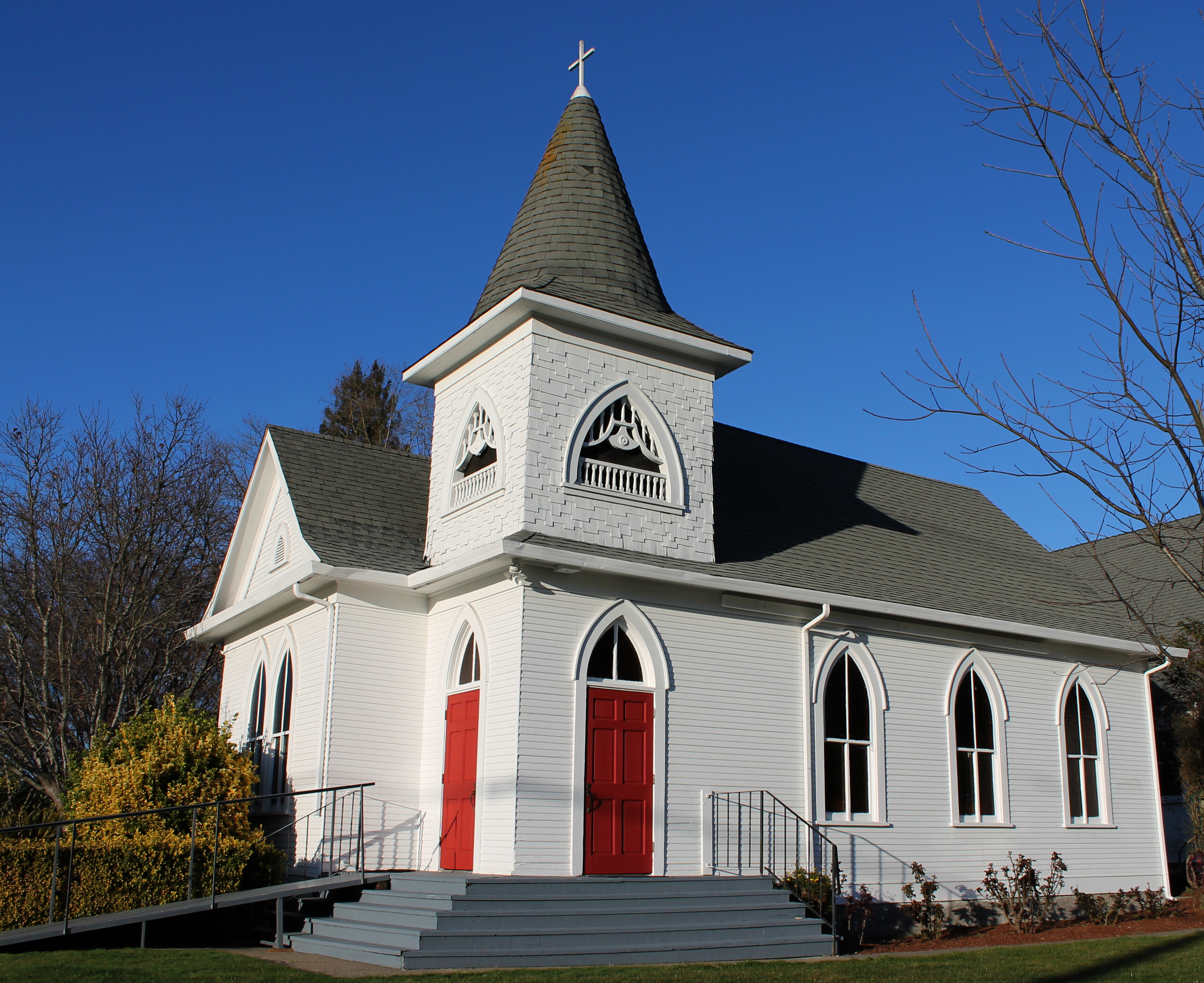
The Church of the Oaks (built in 1907)

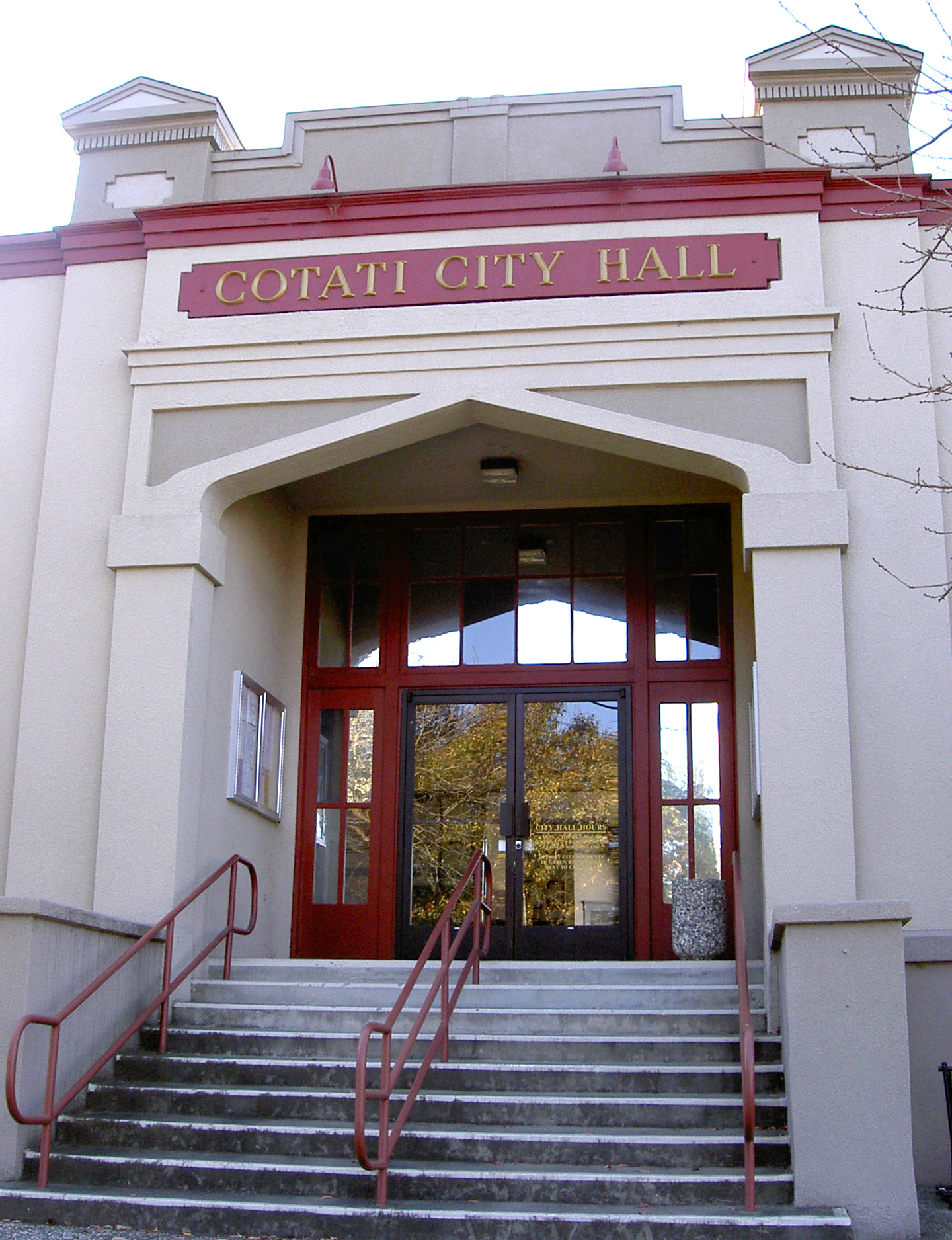
201 West Sierra as of 2007

Cotati's hexagonal plaza and street grid plan was designed during the 1890s by Newton Smyth as an alternative to the traditional grid. Dr. Thomas Page's barn once stood where the plaza is today, and each of the streets surrounding the plaza is named after one of his sons. In 1892, the Page family created the Cotati Land Company to subdivide their ranch into parcels of five to twenty acres (two to eight hectares). By 1901, good land was selling for $30 to $60 per acre. Page family ownership ended in 1944.

The Cotati area was shaken up by the 1906 San Francisco earthquake. After the quake, Drury Butler reported that "the chimneys were as a rule thrown down". In particular, the Stony Point School at 38.34325°N 122.74166°W suffered a chimney failure.

The Northwestern Pacific Railroad built the Cotati Depot in 1907. It was located near the East Cotati Avenue crossing, almost 1 mi (1.6 km) east of the plaza. It was demolished to make way for Sonoma–Marin Area Rail Transit's Cotati station.

Prior to 1915, the major north–south roads (Petaluma Hill Road and Stony Point Road) bypassed Cotati. In that year, the state routed the Redwood Highway (part of U.S. Route 101) onto the mostly unpaved Cotati Boulevard. U.S. 101 passed through the downtown plaza until 1955, when the highway was rerouted further west. U.S. 101 still bisects Cotati, and the former route is called Old Redwood Highway.

In February 1921, the old schoolhouse at 201 West Sierra burned down. A new school built on the same site opened in 1922. This building has served as City Hall since 1971. The rear of this building housed the Cotati Police Department until September 3, 2003, when the department moved into a new building next door.

The Cotati Speedway, a wooden board track for automobile racing, was built near the depot around 1921. It was about 1.25 mi (2 km) in circumference. World records were set there, but it failed in its first season and was torn down in 1922.

In 1927, the Cotati Volunteer Fire Department was organized. Since 1993, Cotati has been part of the Rancho Adobe Fire Protection District.

A local weekly newspaper called The Cotatian was established by E. A. Little in 1944 and lasted until 1964. The current local paper is The Community Voice, published in neighboring Penngrove.

=== Incorporation, growth, and rent control ===
On July 2, 1963, less than a year after the incorporation of the lands north of town to form Rohnert Park, voters approved (by a 284-to-41 margin) the incorporation of Cotati as a separate city. After incorporation, the city grew rapidly, due in part to being within commuting range of San Francisco. Between 1965 and 2000, the population increased by more than a factor of four.

In 1979, Cotati voters approved a rent control ordinance for all residential rentals, but in 1995, that ordinance was partly preempted by the passage of AB (Assembly Bill) 1164, known as the Costa/Hawkins Bill. At the time, Cotati was one of five cities in California with "strong rent control" laws which included vacancy control. (The other cities were West Hollywood, Santa Monica, Berkeley and East Palo Alto). The Costa/Hawkins bill made it impossible for California municipalities to enforce vacancy control, except in special cases like mobile home parks. When the 1979 ordinance was repealed by Cotati voters in 1998, it was replaced with a more limited ordinance aimed at mobile home parks. At the present time, eight of the nine incorporated areas in Sonoma County have rent control for mobile home parks, the exception being Healdsburg.

In 1990, Cotati citizens voted to impose a limit on future annexation of land by the city. This was followed in 1997 by a ballot measure prohibiting "big-box" retail stores of more than 43,000 square feet (4,000 m^{2}). However, on November 4, 2003, Cotati voters approved (by 1,047 votes to 1,013) Measure B, granting an exception to this ordinance so that a Lowe's home improvement warehouse could be built on the west side of U.S. 101.

=== Budget crisis ===
In order to cope with declining revenue, the City instituted a series of budget cuts, starting in 2007. As of August 2009, the City expected to run out of money in its General Fund within a year.

In April 2010, Cotati voters passed Measure A, which imposed a 0.5% sales tax for five years. In June 2014, they passed Measure G (by a vote of 922 to 808) to increase the city sales tax to 1%.

== Geography ==
According to the United States Census Bureau, the city has a total area of 1.88 sq mi (4.9 km^{2}), 0.17% of which is water.

The city is about 17 mi (27 km) from the Pacific Ocean. It lies entirely in the drainage basin of the Laguna de Santa Rosa. The Petaluma River watershed begins just south of town. To the west is the Stemple Creek watershed. The sources of all three watercourses lie in the hilly area between Stony Point Road and U.S. 101, just west of town.

A gap in the coastal ridges near Petaluma often allows coastal fog to reach Cotati in the summer, giving it a marine climate that is noticeably cooler and less sunny than the "coastal" climates of nearby Santa Rosa and Sebastopol. Cotati averages fewer than 800 hours per growing season in the 70–90 °F (21–32 °C) range.

The soils of the Cotati area are characterized by recent alluvial materials, explicitly those areas bordering the Laguna de Santa Rosa and its tributary Washoe Creek. These materials are largely stream and valley alluvium, with artificial fill in some areas.

Active faults near Cotati include the Rodgers Creek Fault (5 mi or 8 km east) and the Tolay Fault.

To the west of Cotati is wetland habitat for Sebastopol meadowfoam, Pitkin Marsh lily, Showy Indian clover, and several other endangered species.

== Demographics ==
Historical population
Census	Pop.	Note	%±
1960	1,852		—
1970	1,368		−26.1%
1980	3,346		144.6%
1990	5,714		70.8%
2000	6,471		13.2%
2010	7,265		12.3%
2020	7,584		4.4%
U.S. Decennial Census; 1860–1870 1880-1890; 1900 1910 1920; 1930 1940 1950; 1960 1970 1980; 1990 2000 2010; 2020

=== 2020 census ===
As of the 2020 census, Cotati had a population of 7,584. The median age was 39.5 years. 19.5% of residents were under the age of 18 and 15.8% of residents were 65 years of age or older. For every 100 females there were 90.9 males, and for every 100 females age 18 and over there were 88.6 males age 18 and over.

100.0% of residents lived in urban areas, while 0.0% lived in rural areas.

There were 3,089 households in Cotati, of which 29.1% had children under the age of 18 living in them. Of all households, 40.7% were married-couple households, 19.2% were households with a male householder and no spouse or partner present, and 31.0% were households with a female householder and no spouse or partner present. About 28.1% of all households were made up of individuals and 12.5% had someone living alone who was 65 years of age or older.

There were 3,209 housing units, of which 3.7% were vacant. The homeowner vacancy rate was 0.9% and the rental vacancy rate was 3.6%.

Racial composition as of the 2020 census
Race	Number	Percent
White	5,164	68.1%
Black or African American	106	1.4%
American Indian and Alaska Native	94	1.2%
Asian	301	4.0%
Native Hawaiian and Other Pacific Islander	20	0.3%
Some other race	732	9.7%
Two or more races	1,167	15.4%
Hispanic or Latino (of any race)	1,720	22.7%

=== Income and poverty ===
In 2023, the US Census Bureau estimated that the median household income was $112,841, and the per capita income was $56,665. About 2.8% of families and 8.0% of the population were below the poverty line.

=== 2010 census ===
The 2010 United States census reported that Cotati had a population of 7,265. The population density was 3,857.8 inhabitants per square mile (1,489.5/km^{2}). The racial makeup of Cotati was 5,929 (81.6%) White, 1,255 (17.3%) Hispanic, 122 (1.7%) African American, 75 (1.0%) Native American, 283 (3.9%) Asian, 30 (0.4%) Pacific Islander, 427 (5.9%) from other races, and 399 (5.5%) from two or more races.

The Census reported that 99.9% of the population lived in households and 0.1% lived in non-institutionalized group quarters.

There were 2,978 households, out of which 941 (31.6%) had children under the age of 18 living in them, 1,214 (40.8%) were opposite-sex married couples living together, 399 (13.4%) had a female householder with no husband present, 161 (5.4%) had a male householder with no wife present. There were 259 (8.7%) unmarried opposite-sex partnerships, and 35 (1.2%) same-sex married couples or partnerships. 812 households (27.3%) were made up of individuals, and 215 (7.2%) had someone living alone who was 65 years of age or older. The average household size was 2.44. There were 1,774 families (59.6% of all households); the average family size was 2.97.

The population was spread out, with 1,591 people (21.9%) under the age of 18, 871 people (12.0%) aged 18 to 24, 2,060 people (28.4%) aged 25 to 44, 2,130 people (29.3%) aged 45 to 64, and 613 people (8.4%) who were 65 years of age or older. The median age was 36.2 years. For every 100 females, there were 90.5 males. For every 100 females age 18 and over, there were 86.7 males.

There were 3,143 housing units at an average density of 1,669.0 per square mile (644.4/km^{2}), of which 59.1% were owner-occupied and 40.9% were occupied by renters. The homeowner vacancy rate was 2.0%; the rental vacancy rate was 5.6%. 59.3% of the population lived in owner-occupied housing units and 40.6% lived in rental housing units.

== Economy ==
The Cotati Chamber of Commerce is a business organization that promotes economic prosperity within the City of Cotati through economic development services, business services and community events. The chamber is a nonprofit 501(c)(6) organization funded by membership dues, fundraising projects and donations.

== Arts and culture ==
Cotati has numerous annual events, many of them organized by its Community and Environment Commission:

- Pasta Feed and Bingo Night, a fundraising event, usually held in late February or early March
- Farmers' Market, weekly from June to September
- Cotati Earth Day, around the end of June
- Kids Day Parade and Festival, usually in mid-July
- Accordion Festival, since 1991, usually in mid-August
- Oktoberfest, usually every year in October
- Holiday Tree Lighting Ceremony, usually in early December
- The Downtown Cotati Shop and Stroll, a street fair with locally made crafts and food, live music, kids activities, horse and carriage rides always the Saturday after the tree lighting.

== Parks and recreation ==
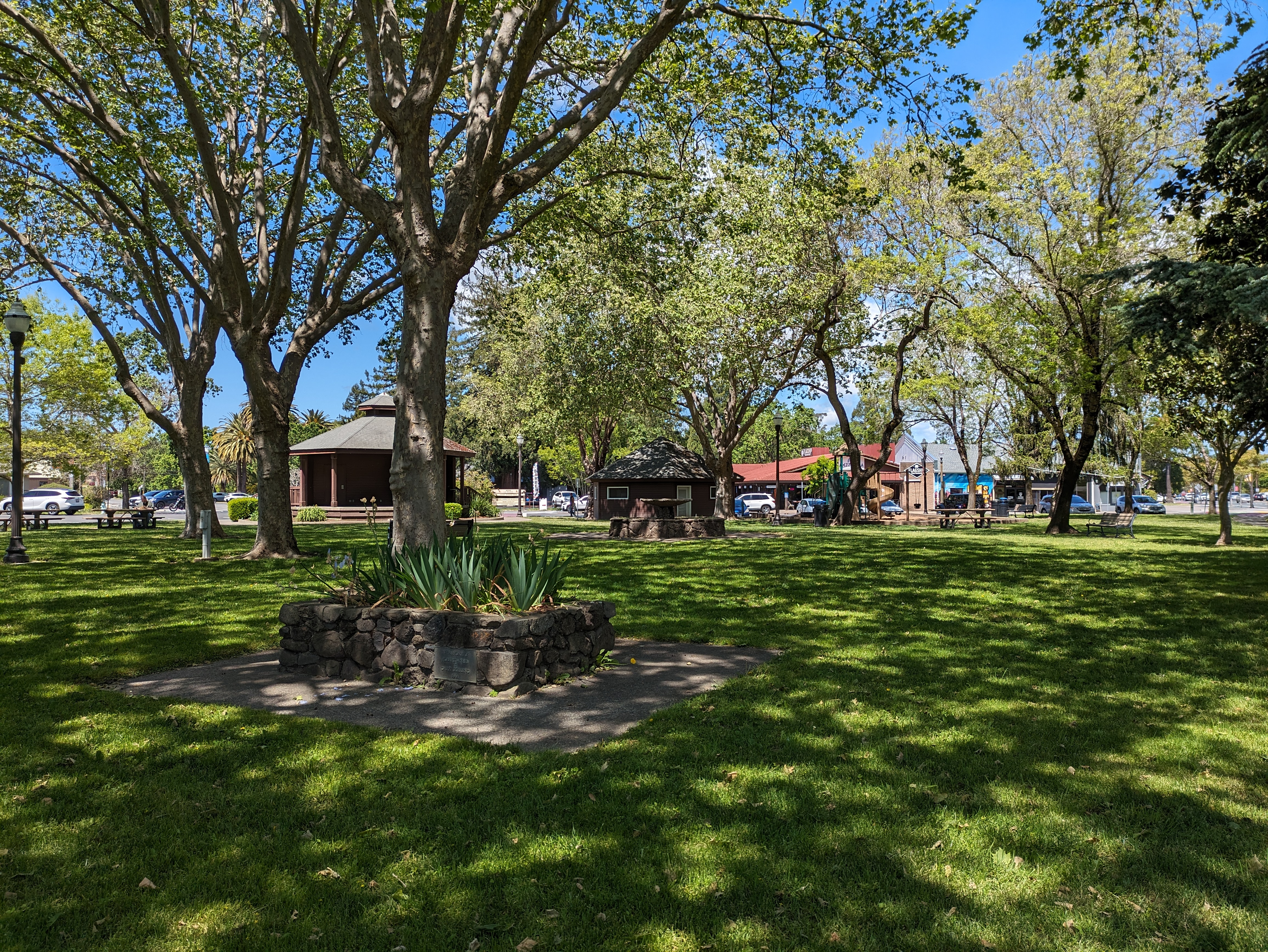
La Plaza Park

As of 1995, Cotati had 20.06 acres (8.12 ha) of parks. Cotati parks include:

- Cator Field (along School Street, where the basketball courts are located)
- Helen Putnam Park (along Myrtle Avenue, where the dog park and soccer field are located)
- Kotate Park (playground)
- La Plaza Park (along Old Redwood Highway in the center of town, where the bandstand is located and many annual events are held)

== Government ==
Cotati is governed by a city council with five members, who serve four-year terms. Each year, council members elect a mayor and vice mayor from among themselves. Municipal election are held in November during even-numbered years.

The city has its own police department.

With respect to the United States House of Representatives, Cotati is in California's 4th congressional district, represented by Democrat Mike Thompson. Cotati is also part of the 3rd senatorial district, represented by Democrat Christopher Cabaldon, the 12th Assembly district, represented by Democrat Damon Connolly, and Sonoma County's 2nd Supervisorial district.

According to the California Secretary of State, as of February 10, 2019, Cotati has 4,506 registered voters. Of those, 2,365 (52.5%) are registered Democrats, 701 (15.6%) are registered Republicans, and 1,175 (26.1%) have declined to state a political party.

== Education ==
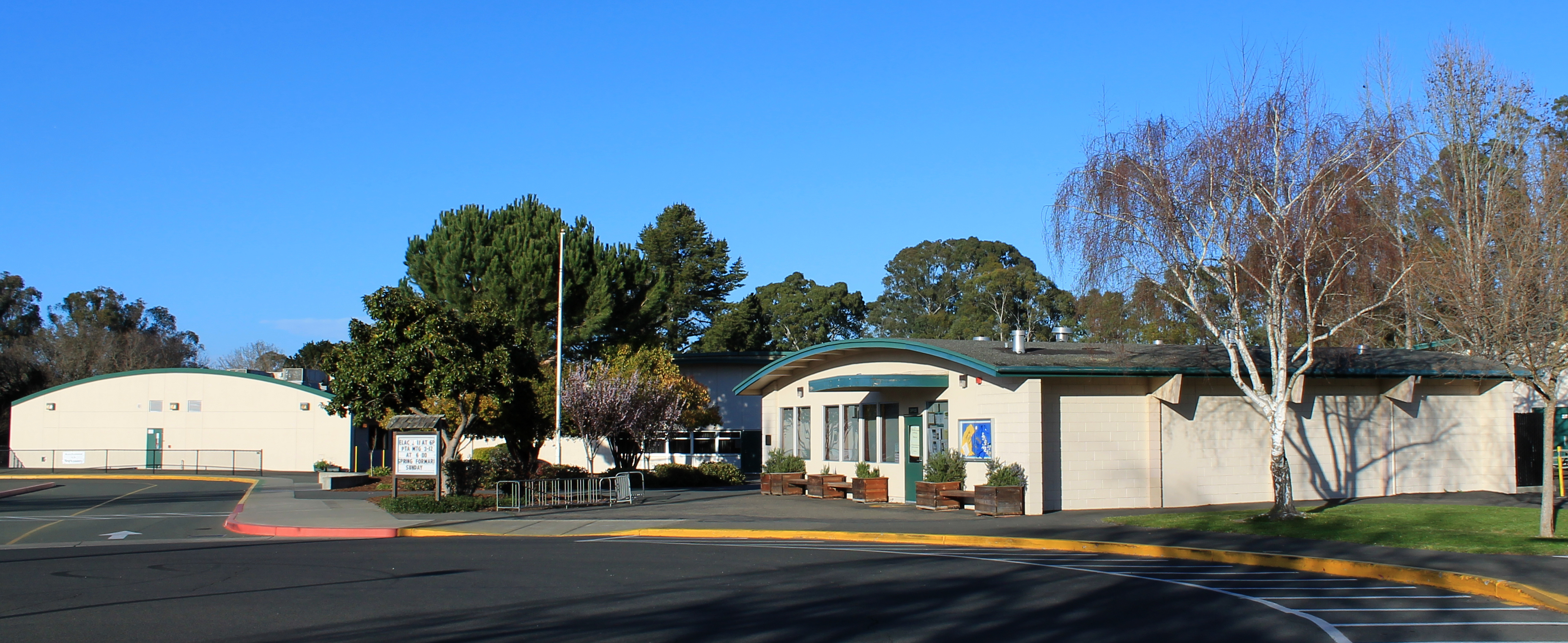
Thomas Page School

The city is served by Cotati-Rohnert Park Unified School District. Thomas Page Elementary School is the only public school actually located in Cotati. The main high school serving Cotati is Rancho Cotate High School, which is in neighboring Rohnert Park.

Sonoma State University, a public college about 1 mi (1.6 km) east of the city limits, has an influence on Cotati.

Cotati is served by the Sonoma County Library, a public library with branches in Rohnert Park and Petaluma.

== Infrastructure ==
=== Transportation ===
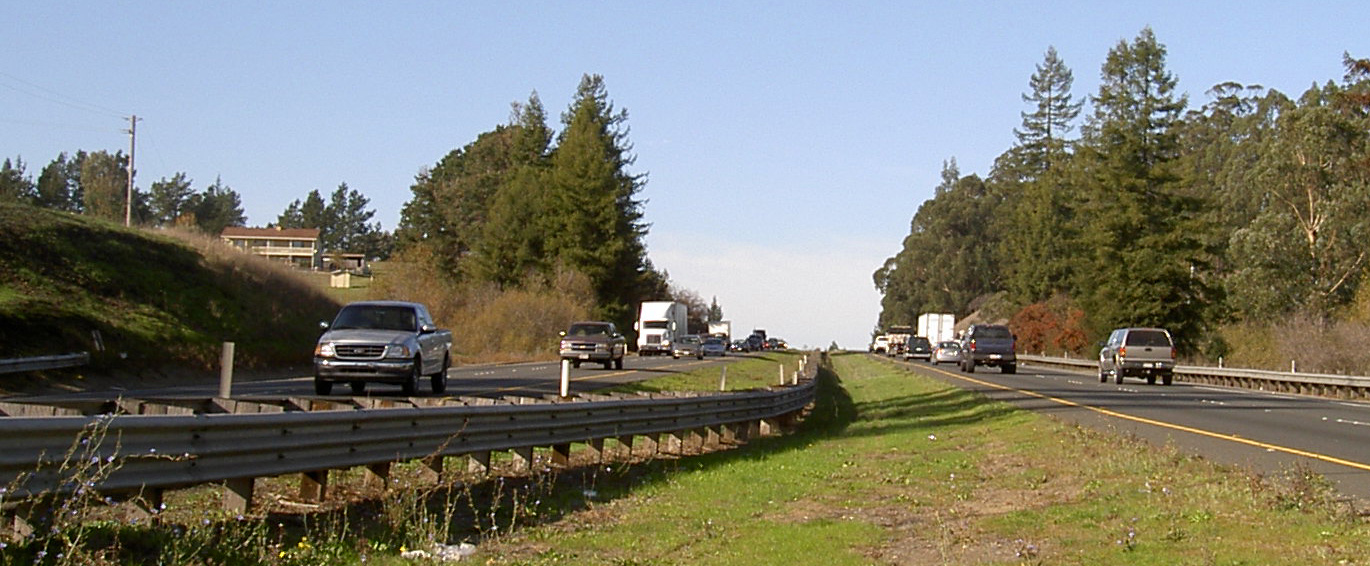
The Cotati Grade on U.S. Route 101

Cotati is served by bus routes operated by Golden Gate Transit (routes 72, 75, and 80) and Sonoma County Transit.

The nearest major airports are San Francisco International Airport and Oakland International Airport. The Santa Rosa airport, which is closer, also offers passenger service.

From the south, U.S. Route 101 North and State Route 116 West approach Cotati on a multi-lane freeway alignment which Caltrans calls the Cotati Grade, with exits at Railroad Avenue and West Sierra Avenue. From the west, State Route 116 East approaches on the two-lane Gravenstein Highway. From the north, U.S. Route 101 South approaches Cotati as a multi-lane freeway with a single exit at Gravenstein Highway.

Sonoma–Marin Area Rail Transit began service to its Cotati station in August 2017.

== See also ==
- Jim Boggio
- List of cities and towns in California
- List of cities and towns in the San Francisco Bay Area
