= Novato Downtown station =

Train station in Novato, California, US

Novato Downtown
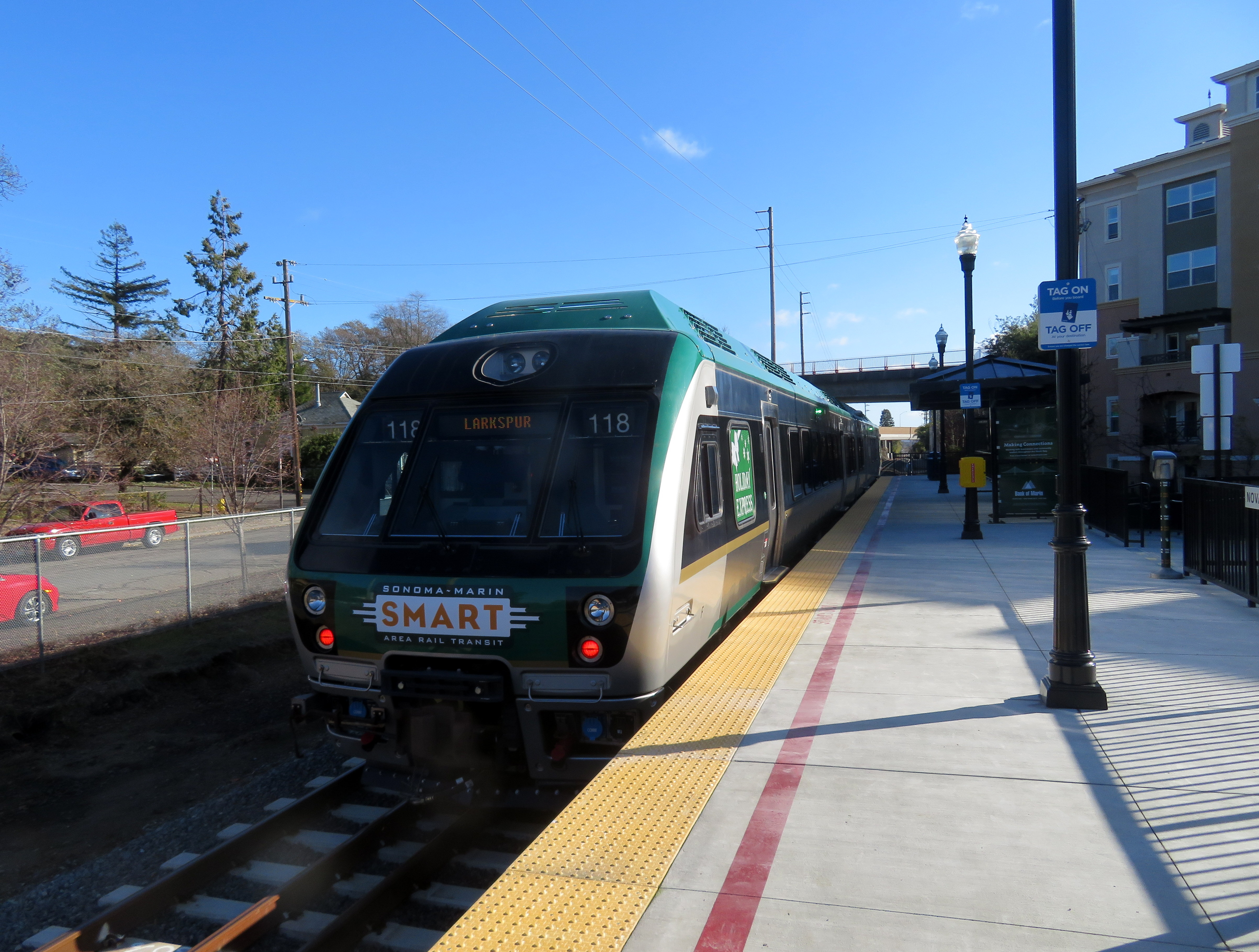
- A southbound train at Novato Downtown in December 2019

General information
- Location: Grant Avenue at Railroad Avenue; Novato, California
- Coordinates: 38.1063°N 122.5647°W
- Elevation: 19.7 ft (6.0 m)
- Line: SMART Mainline Subdivision
- Platforms: 1 side platform
- Tracks: 1 (with gauntlet)
- Connections: At Novato Transit Center: Golden Gate Transit; Marin Transit

Construction
- Accessible: Yes

Other information
- Station code: SMART: NVD

History
- Opened: 1879 (NWP); December 14, 2019 (SMART)
- Closed: November 10, 1958 (NWP)
- Rebuilt: 1903, 1916, 2019

Services
Preceding station	SMART	Following station
Novato San Marin toward Windsor	SMART	Novato Hamilton toward Larkspur
Former services
Preceding station	Northwestern Pacific Railroad	Following station
Petaluma toward Eureka	Main Line	Ignacio toward Sausalito
Location

Novato Downtown station is a train station in Novato, California. It opened as an infill station for the Sonoma–Marin Area Rail Transit (SMART) service in December 2019. Prior to that, it was in operation from 1879 to 1958 by the Northwestern Pacific Railroad.

== History ==
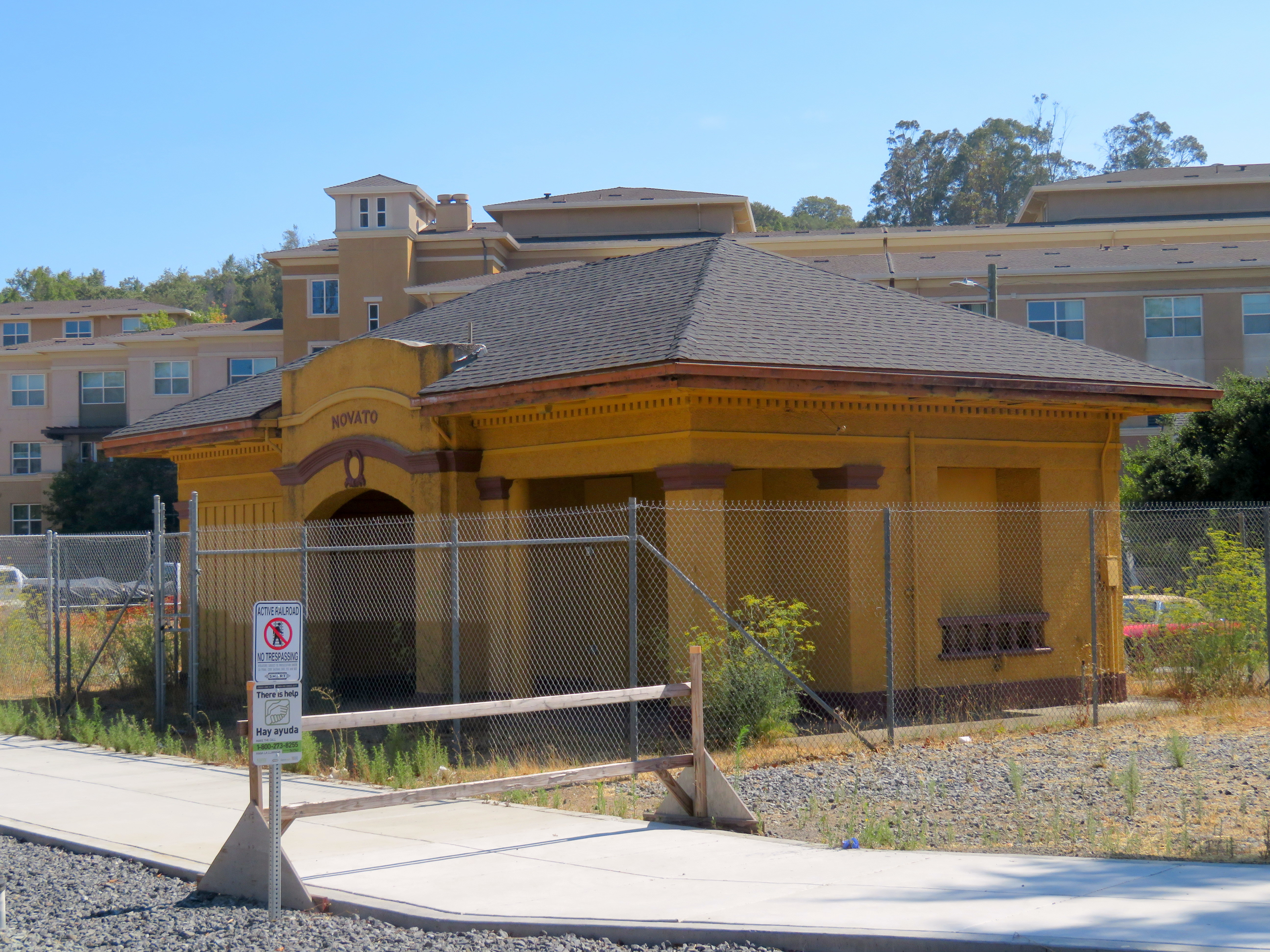
The former station building in 2018

The original Northwestern Pacific (NWP) depot was built out of redwood on the site in 1879; that building was moved nearby and a new one constructed in 1903. The second station was destroyed in a fire in 1916, and the current station building was built as its replacement. Increased automobile ownership and highway construction led to a decline of rail travel in Marin County, thus leading to disuse of the facility as a passenger terminal after November 10, 1958.

Not part of the design for the original ten stations from SMART's Initial Opening Segment, funding and construction of the station was undertaken by the City of Novato. Station plans were finalized in 2016 and the platform was built at a cost of $2.4 million by the time trains began operation. The Metropolitan Transportation Commission provided $1.5 million toward finishing the station, leaving $1.6 million to be financed via an additional source or via the city's Hamilton Trust.

By May 2018, the Phase 2 cost of construction had increased to $5.2 million. The SMART Board approved the station plan in July 2018. Station equipment was expected to be installed in the summer, and testing done in the fall. By September 2019, the total cost was over $7 million.

Original plans called for the station to only have limited service due to its proximity to the Novato San Marin station. However, the SMART Board voted in June 2019 to instate regular, full-time service to the station; testing commenced on November 8, 2019. The station opened on December 14, 2019, for weekend and holiday service; weekday service began on January 1, 2020.
