= Downtown Chevron Station =

- U.S. National Register of Historic Places
- The station in 1940

- Location within Huntsville, Alabama Location within Alabama Location within the United States
- Location: 300 E. Clinton Ave., Huntsville, Alabama
- Coordinates: 34°43′56″N 86°35′3.5″W
- Area: less than one acre
- Built: 1919
- Architectural style: Commercial
- MPS: Downtown Huntsville MRA
- NRHP reference No.: 80000707
- Added to NRHP: September 22, 1980

The Downtown Chevron Station was a historic service station in Huntsville, Alabama. Built in 1919, it was one of the first buildings in the city tailored to the automobile. The center section of the station was built of brick in a style similar to other commercial and residential buildings in the area. The windows were large panes topped with three vertical panes (a style commonly seen on bungalows), and the main entrance had a similar transom. The hipped roof extended from the building towards the corner of Clinton Avenue and Greene Street, providing cover for the pumps. Flat-roofed service bays with multi-pane sash windows were added along the Clinton Avenue side in 1929 and 1938. The building was listed on the National Register of Historic Places in 1980. It has been demolished since its listing, and a modern office building is on the site.
