= Cloverdale Depot =

Transit center in Cloverdale, California

Cloverdale
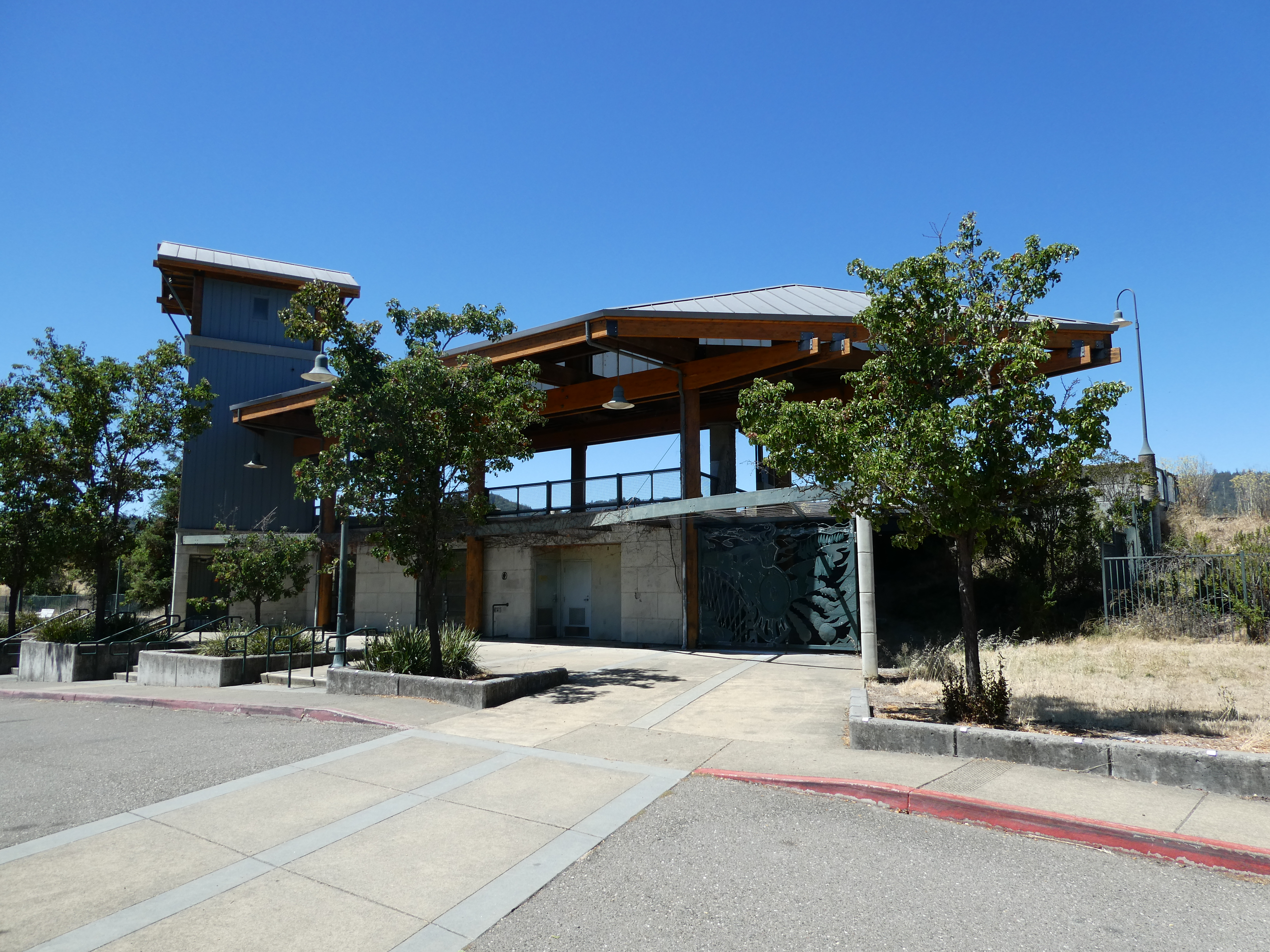
- Cloverdale Depot in July 2022

General information
- Location: 501 Asti Road; Cloverdale, California
- Coordinates: 38.7985°N 123.0119°W
- Platforms: 1 side platform
- Tracks: 1
- Connections: Amtrak Thruway: 7

Construction
- Parking: Yes
- Accessible: Yes

Other information
- Station code: SMART: CLO; Amtrak: CLV

History
- Opened: 1997 (bus)

Future services
Preceding station	SMART	Following station
Terminus	Future service	Healdsburg toward Larkspur
- Cloverdale Railroad Station
- U.S. National Register of Historic Places
- Location: Railroad Avenue; Cloverdale, California
- Coordinates: 38°48′14″N 123°00′41″W
- Area: 0.2 acres (0.081 ha)
- Demolished: September 1991
- NRHP reference No.: 76000536
- Added to NRHP: December 12, 1976
Location

Cloverdale Depot is a future intermodal station in Cloverdale, California. The facility currently serves as a stop for Amtrak Thruway bus route 7 and is planned to become the northern terminus of Sonoma–Marin Area Rail Transit (SMART) commuter rail service.

== History ==
The original Cloverdale Railroad Station was constructed in 1872 along the Northwestern Pacific Railroad. The 82.5 by 32.3 feet (25.1 m × 9.8 m) wood-frame building was considered an important example of a rural railroad station type, and it was listed on the National Register of Historic Places in 1976. Passenger rail service to Cloverdale ended in 1958.

As part of a later project to reroute U.S. Route 101 around Cloverdale, the disused station was slated to be relocated and preserved as a railway museum. That plan never came to fruition, as the historic station was destroyed in a fire on September 21, 1991.

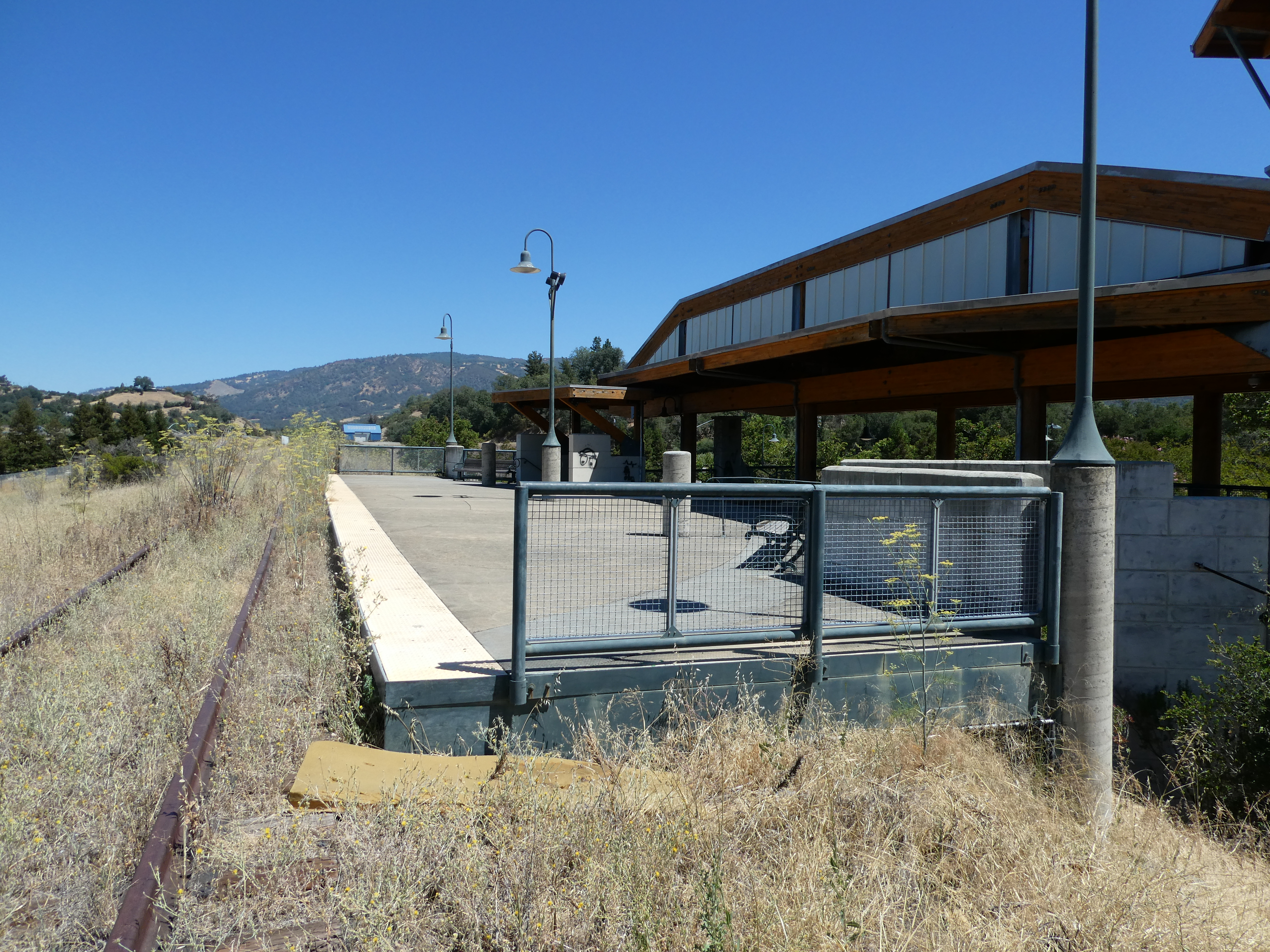
The unused rail platform in 2022

With the anticipation of future rail service, Cloverdale sought to build a new intermodal facility to accommodate both buses and trains. The bus bays and park and ride lot were completed in 1997, followed by construction of the new station building, which was dedicated on May 15, 1999. Construction costs totaled $1.9 million (equivalent to $3.9 million in 2025), funded through a combination of local, state, and federal sources. The facility also briefly housed the corporate offices of the Northwestern Pacific Railroad.

== Future ==
By statute, Cloverdale Depot is designated as the northern terminus of the SMART main line. It is expected to open to passenger rail service after future phases of SMART construction are completed.
