= Petaluma Transit =

Public transit operator in Petaluma, California, USA

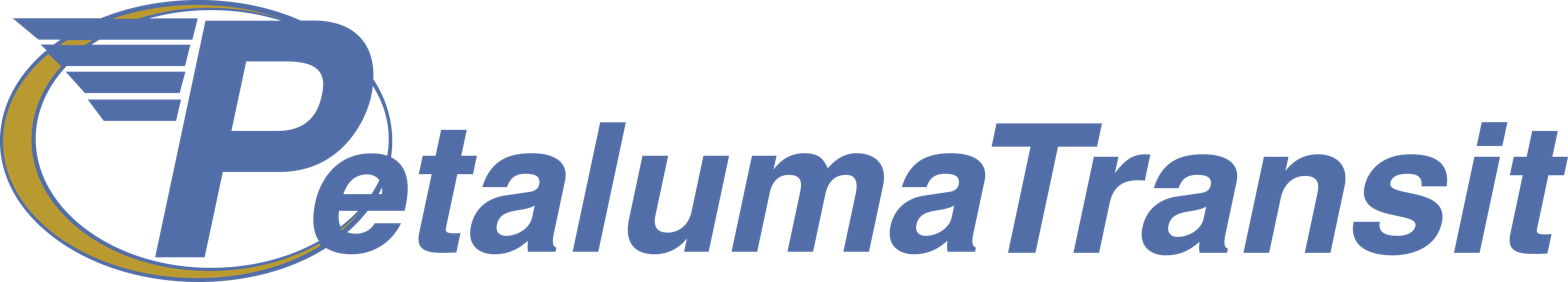

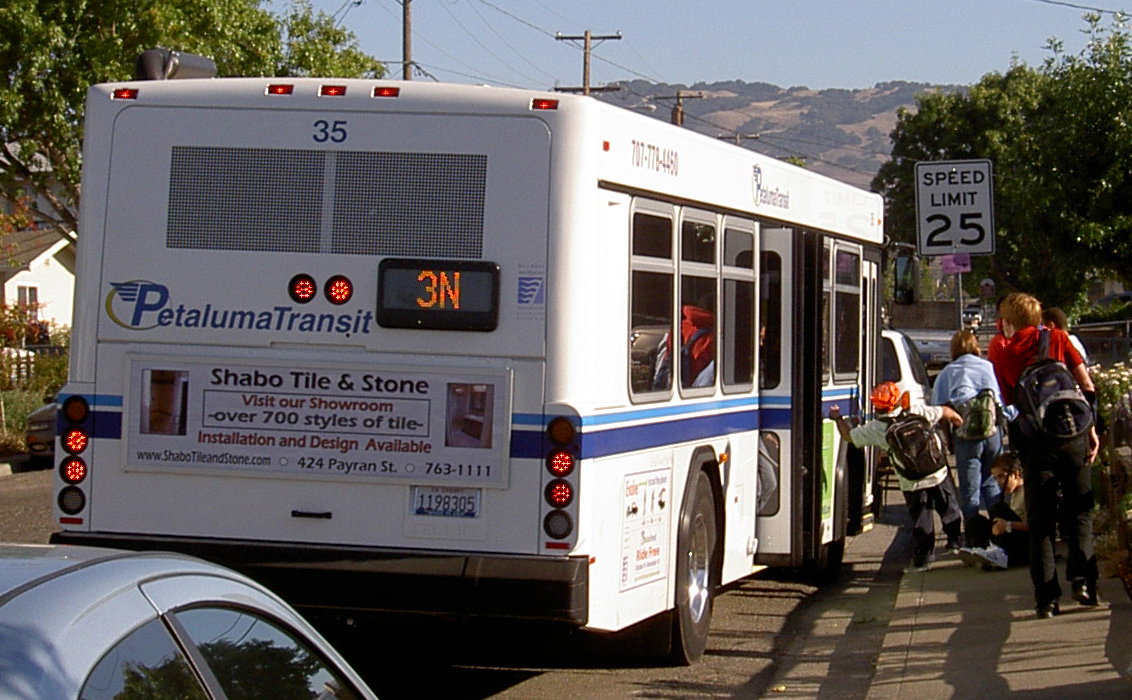
- Petaluma Transit bus in 2008
- Parent: City of Petaluma
- Headquarters: 555 North McDowell Boulevard
- Locale: Petaluma, California
- Service type: bus service, paratransit
- Operator: MV Transportation
- Website: transit.cityofpetaluma.net

Petaluma Transit is the public bus service in the city of Petaluma, California. It operates six local routes and three school routes. Petaluma Paratransit provides ADA-mandated paratransit for eligible persons within Petaluma city limits.

== History ==
The city of Petaluma hired MV Transportation to operate fixed-route bus service in 2000, and MV took over the operation of paratransit service in 2011. MV Transportation's contract renewal in 2018 was scrutinized after a December 2016 incident involving a Petaluma Transit bus, where a pedestrian was hit and seriously injured.

All bus and paratransit service became free for a one-year trial period effective July 1, 2024. It was the first Bay Area transit agency to eliminate fares, and the second California agency to eliminate fares after Commerce Transit. Previously, fares covered less than 10% of operations costs.
