= Sonoma County Transit =

Public transportation system in California, United States

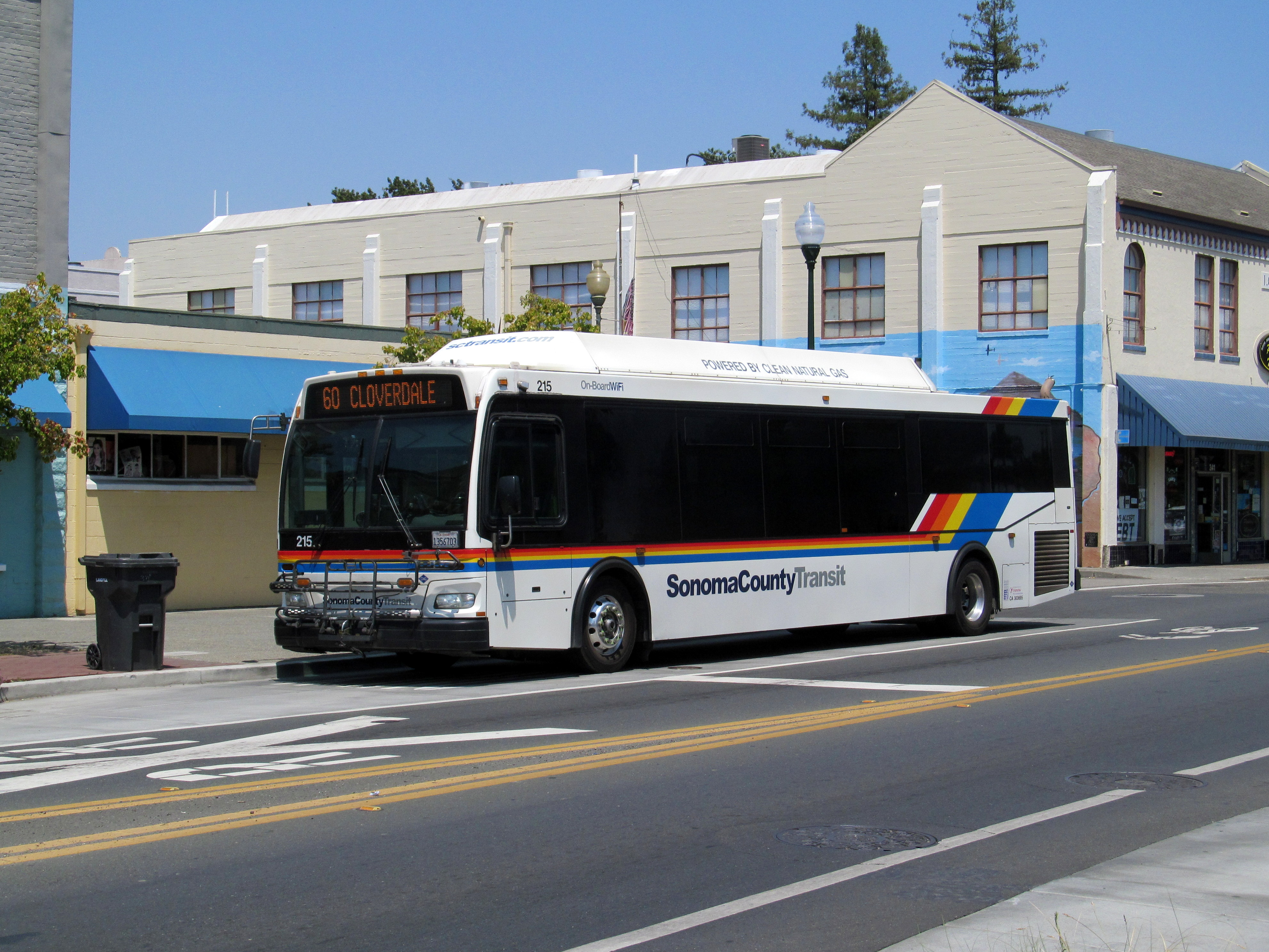
- Bus at Windsor station in 2025
- Parent: Sonoma County
- Founded: 1979
- Headquarters: 355 West Robles Avenue; Santa Rosa, California
- Service area: Sonoma County
- Service type: Bus service, paratransit, park and ride
- Hubs: Santa Rosa Transit Mall; Copeland Street Transit Mall
- Fleet: 51
- Operator: Transdev
- Website: sctransit.com

Sonoma County Transit is a public transportation system based in Sonoma County, California. It was founded as Sonoma County Area Transit and began operating on September 24, 1979, with a single route from Monte Rio to Santa Rosa. The modern system has routes that serve Sonoma County and connect to the Sonoma–Marin Area Rail Transit commuter train.

== Routes ==
Route	Route type (Local/Zone) and Direction	North/East Terminal	South/West Terminal	Municipalities, Communities, and select Points of Interest served
10	Local (Loop)	Rohnert Park (Hunter Drive at Senior Center)		serves Rohnert Park, Cotati, Sonoma State University, SMART - Cotati
12	Local (Loop)	Rohnert Park (Hunter Drive at Senior Center)		serves Rohnert Park, SMART - Rohnert Park
14	Local (Loop)	Rohnert Park (Hunter Drive at Senior Center)		serves Rohnert Park, Kaiser Medical Center, SMART - Rohnert Park
20	Zone (East-West)	Santa Rosa (Coddingtown Mall)	Monte Rio (Creekside Park)	Santa Rosa (Transit Mall), Sebastopol, Graton, Forestville, Rio Nido, Guerneville, Monte Rio
24	Local (Loop)	Downtown Sebastopol (Laguna Parkway)		Sebastopol
26	Zone (East-West)	Sonoma State University	Mirabel Park (Mirabel Rd Ext & River Rd)	Rohnert Park, Cotati, Sebastopol, Forestville
28	Local (Loop)	Occidental (Bohemian Hwy & Hill St)		Occidental, Camp Meeker, Monte Rio, Villa Grande, Duncaan Mills, Guerneville
29	Zone (East-West)	Santa Rosa (Coddingtown Mall)	Rio Nido	Santa Rosa, Sebastopol, Bodega, Bodega Bay, Sonoma Coast, Jenner, Duncan Mills, Monte Rio, Guerneville, Rio Nido
30	Zone (East-West)	Sonoma (Sonoma Plaza)	Santa Rosa (Coddingtown Mall)	Santa Rosa (Transit Mall), Oakmont, Kenwood, Glen Ellen, Agua Caliente, Boyes Hot Springs, El Verano, Sonoma
30X	Zone (East-West)	Sonoma (Sonoma Plaza)	Santa Rosa (Kaiser Hospital)	Santa Rosa (Transit Mall), Kenwood, Boyes Hot Springs, Sonoma
32	Local (North-South)	Agua Caliente (Agua Caliente Rd. & Hwy 12)	Temelec (Hermosa Pkwy & Watmaugh)	Agua Caliente, Boyes Hot Springs, El Verano, Sonoma, Temelec
34	Zone (East-West)	Sonoma (Sonoma Plaza)	Santa Rosa (Transit Mall)	Santa Rosa, Kenwood, Agua Caliente, Boyes Hot Springs, El Verano, Sonoma
40	Zone (East-West)	Sonoma (Sonoma Plaza)	Petaluma (Copeland St. Transit Mall)	Sonoma, Temelec, Petaluma
42	Local (East-West)	Santa Rosa (Transit Mall)	Industry West Business Park	Santa Rosa
44	Zone (North-South)	Santa Rosa (Coddingtown Mall)	Petaluma (Copeland St. Transit Mall)	Santa Rosa (Transit Mall), Rohnert Park, Sonoma State University, Petaluma (East and West)
48	Zone (North-South)	Santa Rosa (Coddingtown Mall)	Petaluma (Copeland St. Transit Mall)	Santa Rosa (Transit Mall), Rohnert Park, Cotati, Petaluma
48X	Zone (North-South)	Santa Rosa (Kaiser Hospital)	Petaluma (Fairgrounds Park and Ride)	Santa Rosa (Transit Mall), Rohnert Park, Cotati, Petaluma
60	Zone (North-South)	Cloverdale (Cloverdale Depot or City Hall Plaza)	Santa Rosa (Transit Mall)	Cloverdale, Asti, Geyserville, Healdsburg, Windsor, Santa Rosa
60X	Zone (North-South)	Cloverdale (Cloverdale Depot)	Santa Rosa (Transit Mall)	Cloverdale, Geyserville, Healdsburg, Windsor, Santa Rosa
62	Zone (North-South)	Windsor (Intermodal Transit Ctr.)	Santa Rosa (Transit Mall)	Windsor, Sonoma County Airport, Santa Rosa
66	Local (Loop)	Windsor Depot (Town Green)		Windsor
67	Local (Loop)	Healdsburg (Vineyard Plaza Safeway)		Healdsburg
68	Local (Loop)	Cloverdale (City Hall)		Cloverdale

== Paratransit ==
Sonoma County Paratransit is designed to serve the needs of individuals with disabilities within Sonoma County. It adheres to ADA standards to serve areas within 3/4 of a mile from any public fixed-route service. This includes service within the incorporated areas of Sonoma County, the Greater Santa Rosa Area, and between the County's nine incorporated cities. In addition, service is provided within the following communities: Windsor, Sebastopol, Sonoma, Sonoma Valley (including Agua Caliente and Boyes Hot Springs), Cotati, Rohnert Park, Rio Nido, Guerneville, Monte Rio, Duncans Mills, and Occidental.

Operating hours for the paratransit service are weekdays from 5:00am to 11:00pm and weekends from 7:00am to 9:00pm.
