= Windsor station (California) =

Railway station in California, US

Windsor
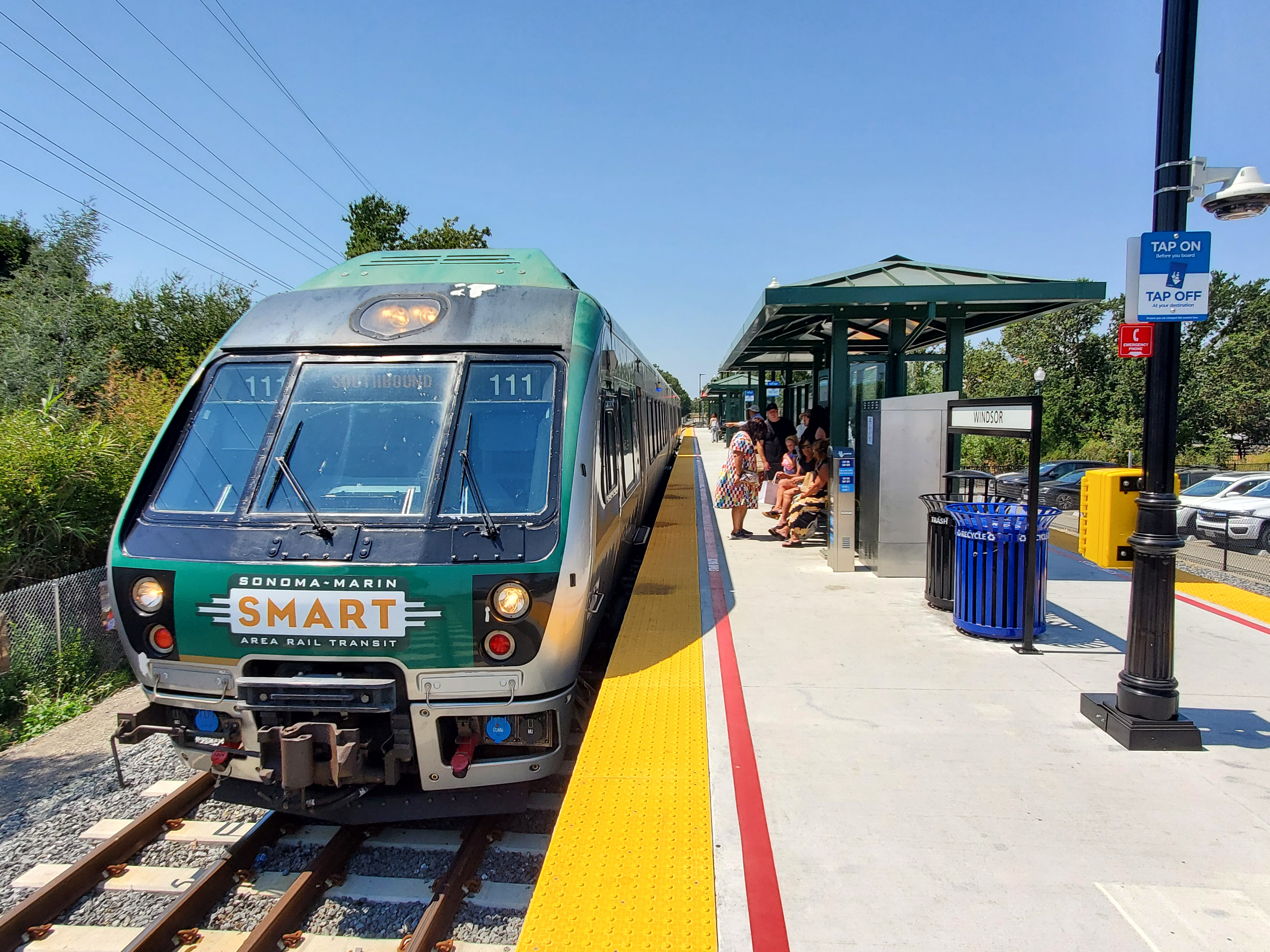
- A SMART train at Windsor station in July 2025

General information
- Location: 464 Emily Rose Circle; Windsor, California; United States
- Coordinates: 38.54853°N 122.81797°W
- Connections: Sonoma County Transit: 60, 62, 66

Other information
- Station code: SMART: WIN

History
- Opened: c. 1900 (NWP); May 31, 2025 (SMART)
- Closed: November 10, 1958
- Rebuilt: 2008
- Original company: Northwestern Pacific Railroad

Services
Preceding station	SMART	Following station
Terminus	SMART	Sonoma County Airport toward Larkspur
Future services
Preceding station	SMART	Following station
Healdsburg (2027) toward Cloverdale	Future service	Sonoma County Airport toward Larkspur
Former services
Preceding station	Northwestern Pacific Railroad	Following station
Healdsburg toward Eureka	Main Line	Fulton toward Sausalito
Location

Windsor station is a Sonoma–Marin Area Rail Transit (SMART) station in Windsor, California. It opened for SMART service on May 31, 2025. Prior to that, it was in operation from c. 1900 to 1958 by the Northwestern Pacific Railroad, and was then a bus station served by Sonoma County Transit.

== History ==
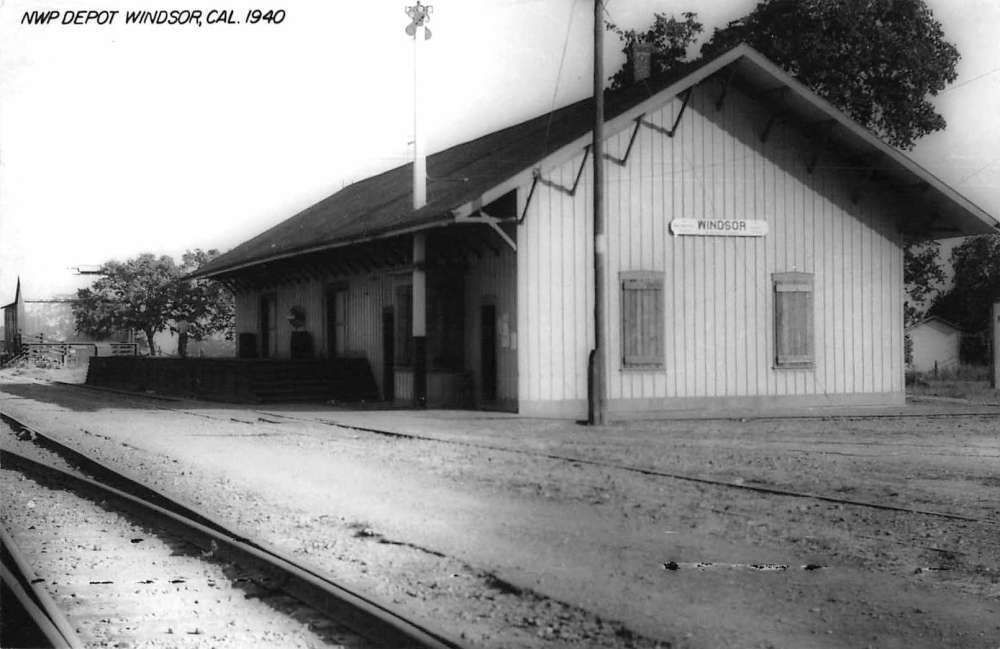
The former Windsor station in 1940

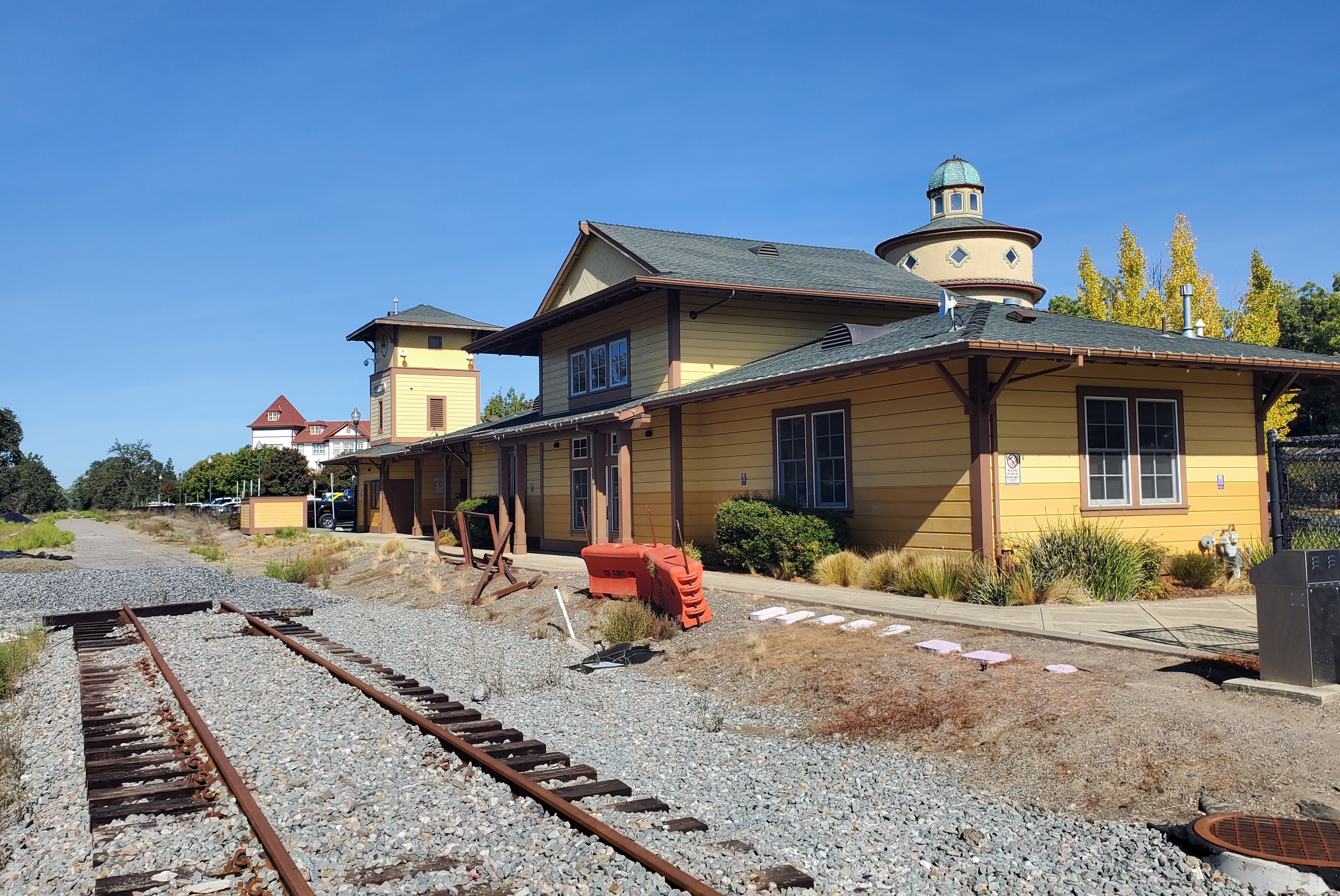
Track construction at Windsor station in 2023

The station building was built by the Northwestern Pacific Railroad in the early 1900s. The station last closed to passenger service after November 10, 1958.

In 2008, the station building was rebuilt by the city for $1.4 million ($2.09 million in 2025 adjusted for inflation) as an intermodal station in anticipation of serving passengers on the then-proposed Sonoma–Marin Area Rail Transit (SMART) commuter rail line. Service to Windsor station was not included in the first phase of SMART, which began service as far north as the station near Charles M. Schulz–Sonoma County Airport in 2017.

Sonoma–Marin Area Rail Transit constructed an extension to Windsor, with service further north to Healdsburg station and Cloverdale station in a future phase. The three-mile (4.8 km) extension is expected to cost $55 million: $20 million from Road Repair and Accountability Act funds, $30 million in Regional Measure 3 funds, and a $5 million federal grant. In September 2018, the SMART board approved $24 million in construction contracts, with service to Windsor expected to begin in late 2021 or early 2022. In 2020 the project completion was delayed to later in 2022 as funding from a recent bridge toll increase was withheld pending litigation. By spring of 2022 the SMART extension was 30% complete, but the lawsuit related to toll increases as well as a separate suit regarding use of the right-of-way had delayed the station's opening indefinitely.

The lawsuit was dismissed in January 2023, freeing up $40 million for SMART, and the agency received a $34 million state grant in February. At that time, SMART intended to wait until June 2023 to determine whether it would have sufficient funding to combine a further extension to Healdsburg with the completion of the Windsor extension. If the full $113 million in additional grants is received, Windsor service would begin in 2025 or 2026, and Healdsburg service by 2027. In June 2023, the agency received a $30 million state grant, sufficient to complete the Windsor extension. Construction resumed in late 2023 with an expected opening date of 2025.

The station opened for passenger service on May 31, 2025, with a grand-opening ceremony on June 13. On June 23, 2025, three early-morning trips were temporarily cut back from Windsor to Sonoma County Airport because residents objected to train horns. They resumed on August 5 after a quiet zone was implemented.
