= MV Mendocino =

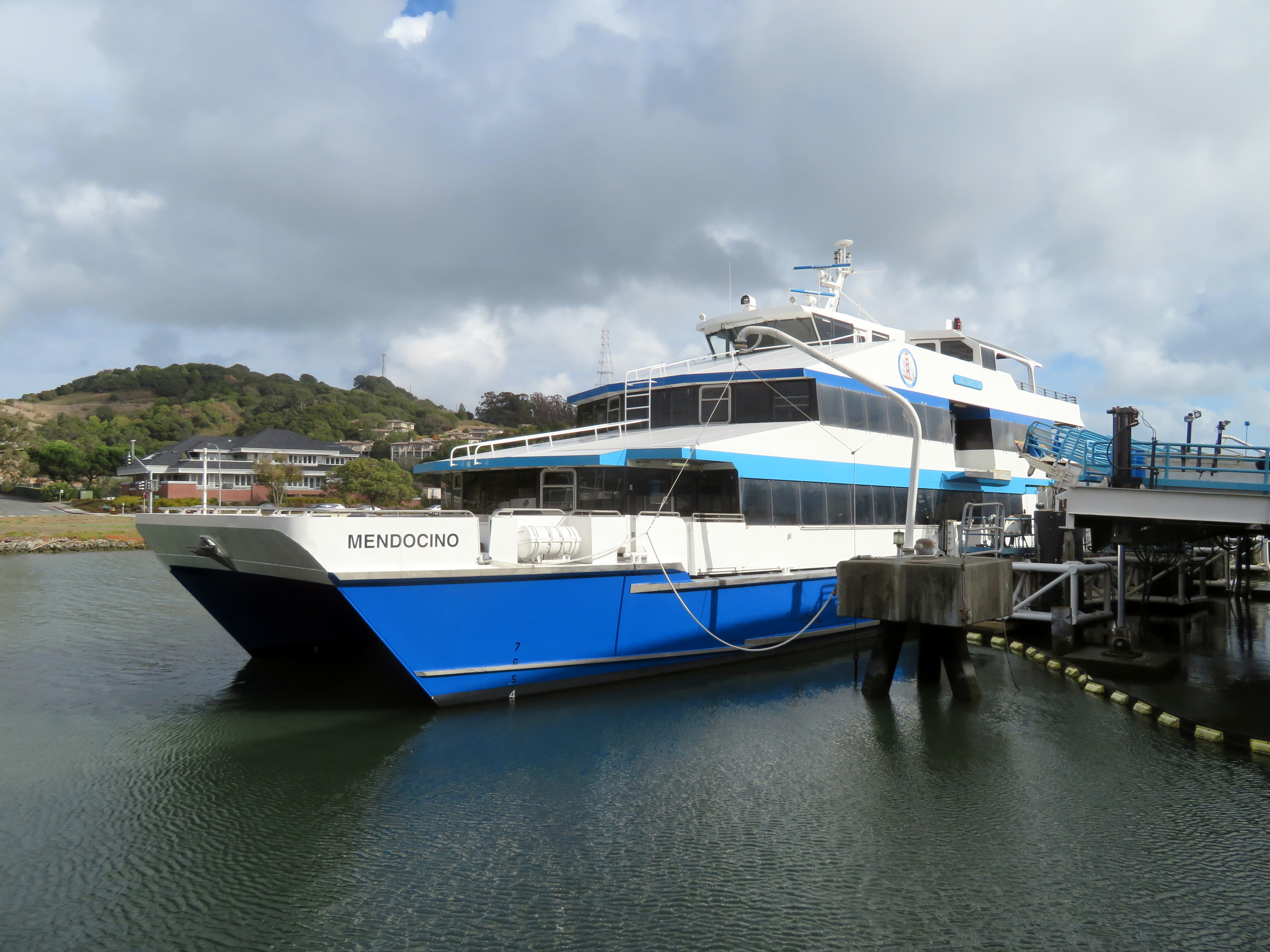
- MV Mendocino at Larkspur Landing in November 2018

History
- Name: M/V Mendocino
- Owner: Golden Gate Bridge, Highway and Transportation District
- Operator: Golden Gate Ferry
- Port of registry: Larkspur, California, United States
- Acquired: 2001
- Identification: IMO number: 8967656; MMSI number: 366970020; Callsign: WDB9115
- Status: Active

General characteristics
- Length: 141 ft 1 in (43.0 m)
- Beam: 34 ft (10.4 m)
- Draft: 4 ft 9 in (1.4 m).
- Decks: 3
- Propulsion: Waterjet
- Speed: 36 kn (67 km/h)
- Capacity: 450 passengers

The M/V Mendocino is a passenger-only fast ferry operated by Golden Gate Ferries.

The vessel is named after Mendocino County, one of the member counties of the Golden Gate Bridge, Highway and Transportation District. The Mendocino was designed by In-Cat and built by Nichols Bros. It was the second catamaran placed into service by Golden Gate Ferry. On July 20, 2001, on its way to Larkspur from the shipbuilder in Washington, Golden Gate Ferry's second high-speed catamaran, M.V. Mendocino, made a stop to be christened in her home county at Noyo Harbor near Fort Bragg. On September 10, 2001, the M.V. Mendocino was placed into service between Larkspur and San Francisco.

From December 2002 to December 2003, to ensure its long-term viability as substantial warranty work was required on the M.V. Mendocino, the vessel was taken out of service and sent back to the original builder who made the necessary repairs at no cost to the District. It had been determined that the aluminum used for the hull was constructed using a process that did not meet stringent marine engineering and U.S. Coast Guard regulations.
