= MV Golden Gate =

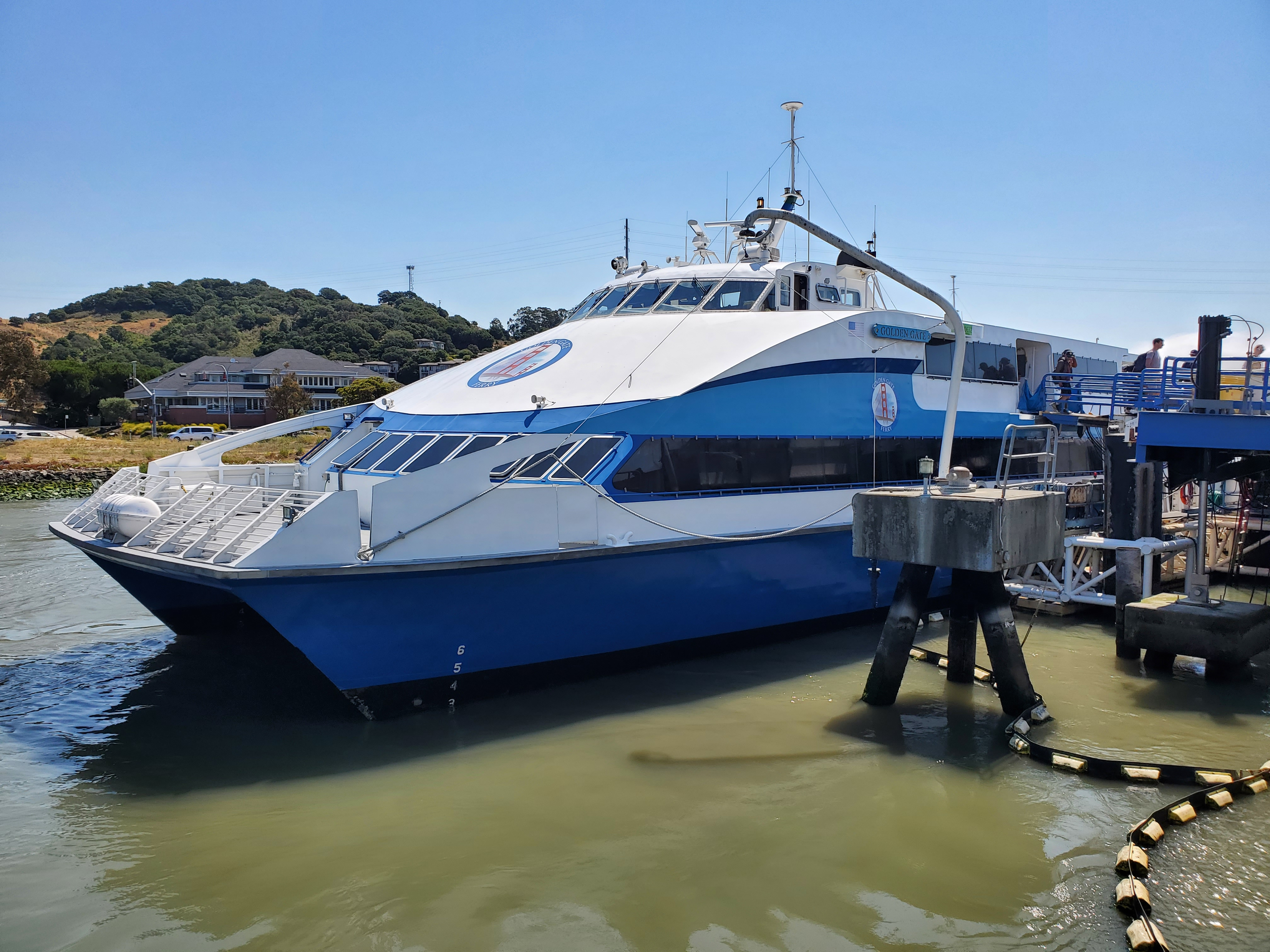
- MV Golden Gate at Larkspur Landing in 2025

History
- Name: MV Golden Gate
- Owner: Golden Gate Bridge, Highway and Transportation District
- Operator: Golden Gate Ferry
- Port of registry: Larkspur, California, United States
- Completed: 1999
- Acquired: 2009
- Identification: IMO number: 9183207; MMSI number: 366778450; Official Number: D1063252; Call Sign: WCY2726
- Status: In service
- Notes: Previously MV Chinook

General characteristics
- Type: Catamaran, passenger-only ferry
- Length: 143 ft 3 in (43.7 m)
- Beam: 39 ft 4 in (12.0 m)
- Draft: 5 ft (1.5 m).
- Installed power: Total 7,200 hp from 4 diesel engines
- Propulsion: Waterjet
- Speed: 38 kn (70 km/h)
- Capacity: 350 passengers

MV Golden Gate (previously MV Chinook) is a passenger-only fast ferry operated by Golden Gate Ferries.

The vessel is the second passenger ferry to hold the name and was purchased from Washington State Ferries by the Golden Gate Bridge, Highway and Transportation District (along with MV Snohomish) and entered service with Golden Gate Transit in May 2011 after a complete refit that began in late 2009.

The vessel was built in 1999 to offer 30 minute ferry service from Bremerton to Seattle. The service ceased a few years later because of beach possible erosion along Puget Sound's Rich Passage. As the Chinook, the ferry had previously been mothballed at the WSF Shipyard at Eagle Harbor, Bainbridge Island for four years when she was placed on eBay for auction on February 20, 2008, with an asking price of $4.5 million (USD).
