= Clipper card =

Public transit ticketing system in the San Francisco Bay Area, US

Clipper
- Clipper logo
- Location: San Francisco Bay Area
- Launched: June 16, 2010
- Technology: MIFARE DESFire (MF3ICD40)
- Operator: Cubic Transportation Systems
- Manager: Metropolitan Transportation Commission
- Currency: United States dollar ($300 maximum load)
- Credit expiry: None
- Auto recharge: Yes
- Validity: 24 transit services (see below)
- Retailed: Online; Ticket machines (BART, Muni, Golden Gate Ferry, San Francisco Bay Ferry (Vallejo only), SMART, select Caltrain stations); Walgreens stores; Select local retail stores; Clipper customer service centers
- Variants: Youth Clipper card; Senior Clipper card; RTC Clipper card; Limited-use Muni ticket; Limited-use Golden Gate Ferry ticket
- Website: clippercard.com

The Clipper card is a reloadable contactless smart card used for automated fare collection in the San Francisco Bay Area. First introduced as TransLink in 2002 by the Metropolitan Transportation Commission (MTC) as a pilot program, it was rebranded in its current form on June 16, 2010. Like other transit smart cards such as the Oyster card, the Clipper card is a credit card-sized stored-value card capable of holding both cash value and transit passes for the participating transit agencies. In addition to the traditional plastic card, Clipper is available as a virtual card in Google Wallet and Apple Wallet. Clipper is accepted by nearly all public transit services in the Bay Area, including but not limited to Muni, BART, Caltrain, AC Transit, SamTrans, Golden Gate Transit, Golden Gate Ferry, San Francisco Bay Ferry, and VTA.

== History ==
=== Translink origins ===
The former TransLink card, issued prior to June 2010

In 1993, Bay Area Rapid Transit (BART) and County Connection launched a pilot program named Translink (not to be confused with other agencies with that name) that allowed the use of a single fare card between the two systems. The card, which used magnetic stripe technology, was envisioned to one day include all Bay Area transit agencies. However, because of technical problems, the program was abandoned two years later.

Translink had a projected capital cost of $4 million when undertaken in 1993. In its current form, first as TransLink and later as Clipper, implementation was expected to cost $30 million. Cost estimates have since increased; in 2008, the projected 25-year capital and operations costs were estimated at $338 million.

Implementation took more than a decade. In 1998, MTC envisioned full availability of TransLink by 2001. However, it was fully operational for only five transit agencies by 2009.

TransLink was developed by Australian-based ERG Group and Motorola under the ERG-Motorola alliance in April 1999. However, upon the launch of Clipper, Cubic Transportation Systems took over administration of distribution, customer service, and financial settlement of the program.

=== Renamed to Clipper ===
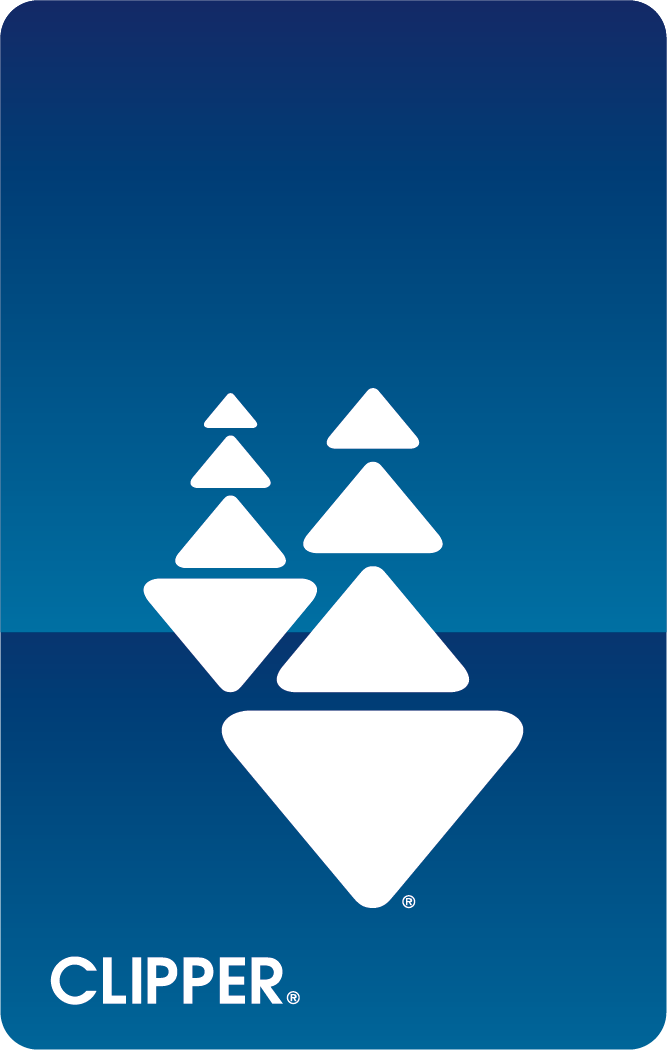
The Clipper card

On June 16, 2010, MTC changed the TransLink name to Clipper, an homage to the clipper ships of the 19th century, the fastest way to travel from the East Coast to San Francisco, and eliminated the contact interface which had been used to load funds onto the cards at TransLink machines.

In October 2010, the MTC selected 路路通 (Pinyin: Lùlùtōng, the "Go Everywhere Card", lit. "every transit route/line pass") as the official Chinese name for Clipper. In Spanish it is known as "tarjeta Clipper".

After the system was renamed to Clipper in 2010, adoption continued slowly: only 7 agencies were fully operational with Clipper by January 2012, 8 in January 2013, 13 by March 2015, finally reaching 20 agencies by March 2016. As of October 2022, the card can be used on 24 agencies, unlocking bike shares, and validating BART parking.

In December 2020, BART announced that it had converted all of its ticket machines to Clipper-only, discontinuing the sale of paper magstripe tickets that had been used since the system's inception in the 1970s. Until November 30, 2023, existing paper tickets remained valid and add-fare machines inside the paid area of each station could be used to add fare to paper tickets if they had insufficient fare remaining to exit at the station in question.

As part of efforts to integrate the fare systems of Bay Area transit agencies, the Clipper Bay Pass pilot program was announced in August 2022. The Bay Pass provides free unlimited rides on Clipper-enabled transit systems to a subset of students at participating educational institutions. The program began expanding to other institutions, such as businesses and non-profits, in January 2024.

=== Clipper Next Generation ===
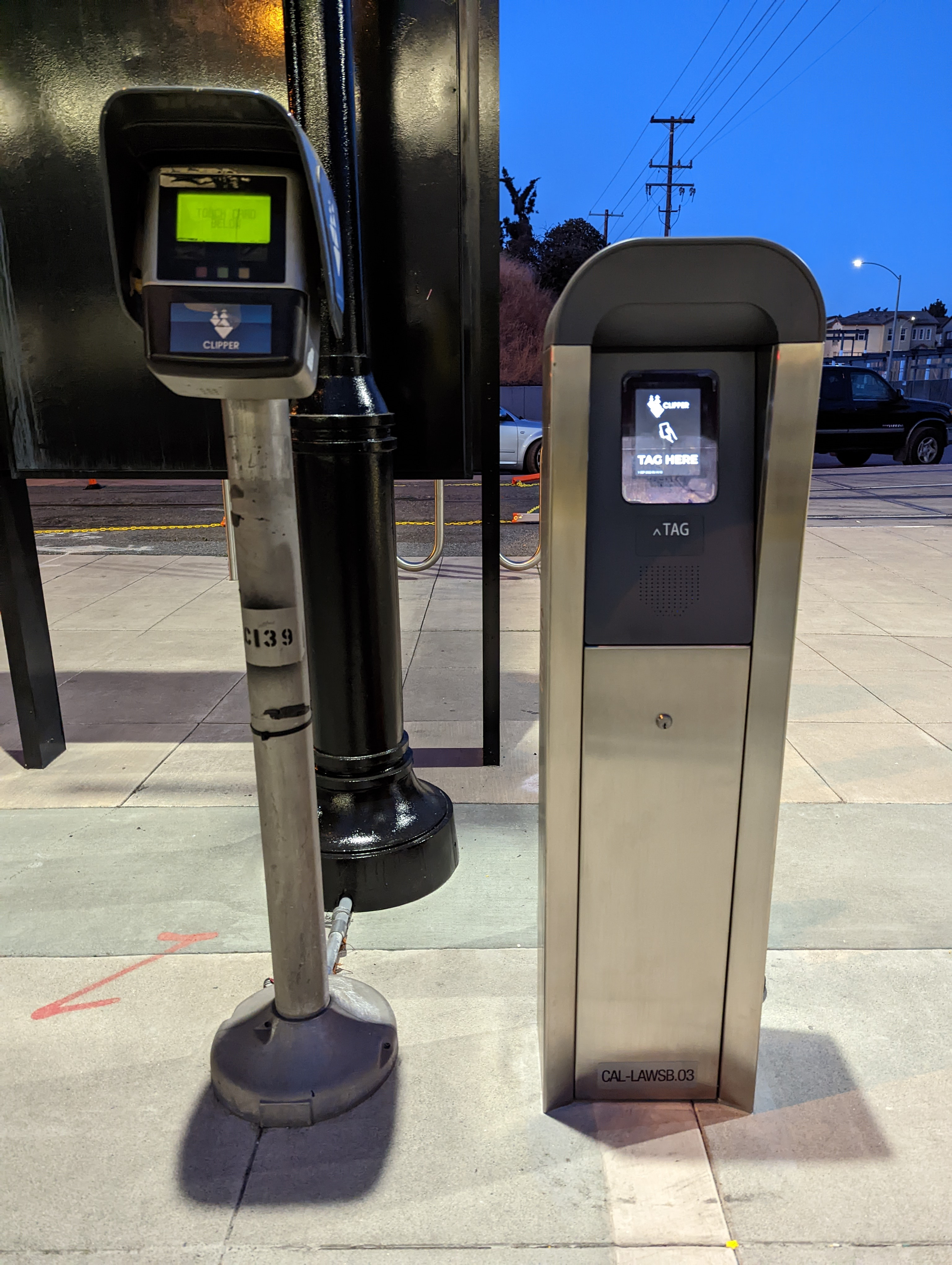
Updated Clipper Card reader (right) alongside legacy reader at Lawrence station, 2022

In 2014, the MTC started an initiative to design the next generation of the Clipper system, nicknamed "C2" or "Clipper 2.0". The contract with Cubic for the existing Clipper system expired in 2019, and the system architecture dates from the 1990s. These factors led the MTC to start developing a next generation system, initially planned to begin operation in 2021. The first contract was awarded in September 2018 for a Next Generation System Integrator; additional contracts were awarded in 2021 (payment services and customer service center), 2022 (new fare cards), and 2023 (card distribution).

The new system was specified to include a mobile app as well as integration with digital wallets. In addition, the next generation will add an open network to directly accept contactless payments using credit or debit card(s) at fare readers. The upgrade was planned to be funded in part by $50 million from Regional Measure 3, a bridge toll increase approved in June 2018, but the funds from the measure were on hold due to a lawsuit until 2023. Implementation of the next generation system has been slowed by the global COVID-19 pandemic; in addition, the new system is required to remain fully compatible with the current generation of Clipper cards without exception, causing additional delays.

On April 15, 2021, Clipper became available in Apple Wallet, and the Clipper mobile app for iOS was released. Integration with Google Pay and an Android app were released on May 19, 2021.

Physical equipment installation for the next generation system started in 2022 with new fare readers. The most noticeable change for riders was the new fare readers were not backwards-compatible with TransLink cards, as announced by Clipper in March 2022. The project had been expected to begin public rollout in April 2025 but has been delayed repeatedly to late 2025 On August 20, 2025, a subset of Clipper 2.0 features was activated when BART began to accept contactless debit and credit card and digital wallets as fare payment methods. On December 10, 2025, the full Clipper 2.0 system, including credit card payments and reduced-cost transfers, began operating across all Clipper-supported transit agencies. During its initial rollout, the Clipper 2.0 system was criticized by transit riders and transit agency managers for malfunctions such as failing fare reloads and the inability to access some Clipper accounts. Six months after rollout, Cubic drew additional criticism for missing deadlines to deliver the full functionality of the fare system, and for continued malfunctions such as outages for ticket-vending machines.

== Usage ==
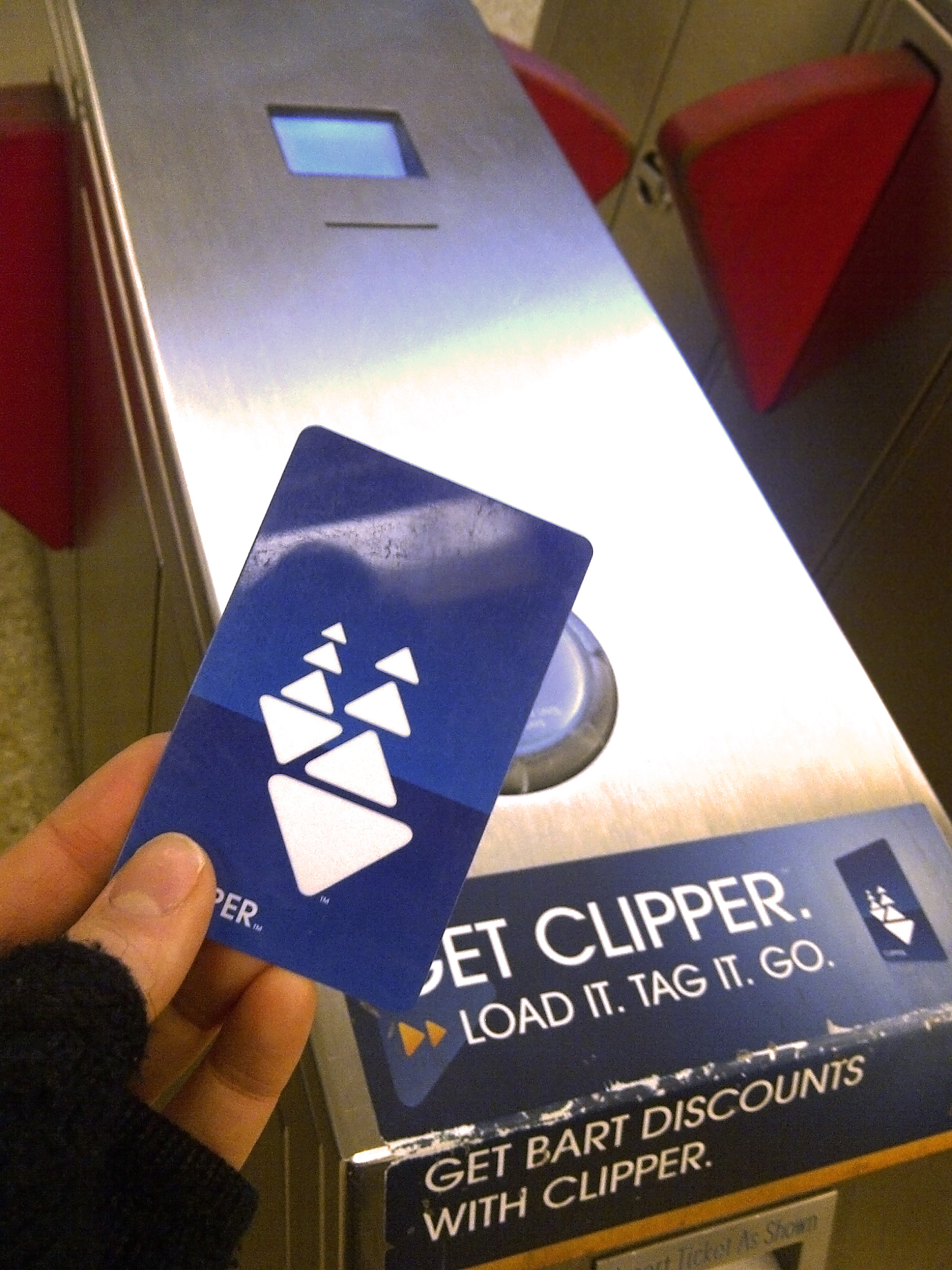
A Clipper card being used to enter a BART faregate

=== Cost of card ===
Obtaining a card was free from introduction in June 2010 to encourage users to adopt the card, until September 1, 2012, when new adult cards began to cost $3. This charge covers the cost (approximately $2) to manufacture each card, helps cover operating expenses, and reduces the incentive to throw away the card if the value goes negative when fare is calculated on exit. The $3 fee is waived if the card is registered for Autoload at the time of purchase (in which case it cannot go negative). There is no fee to transfer plastic Clipper cards to mobile wallets. The $3 fee for new virtual cards in mobile wallets was waived for the first six months following launch but came into effect on October 15, 2021. The fee was temporarily waived again beginning in March 2022 due to supply chain issues reducing the availability of plastic cards. As of 2024, there is still no fee for Clipper cards on phones.

=== Adding money and transit passes ===
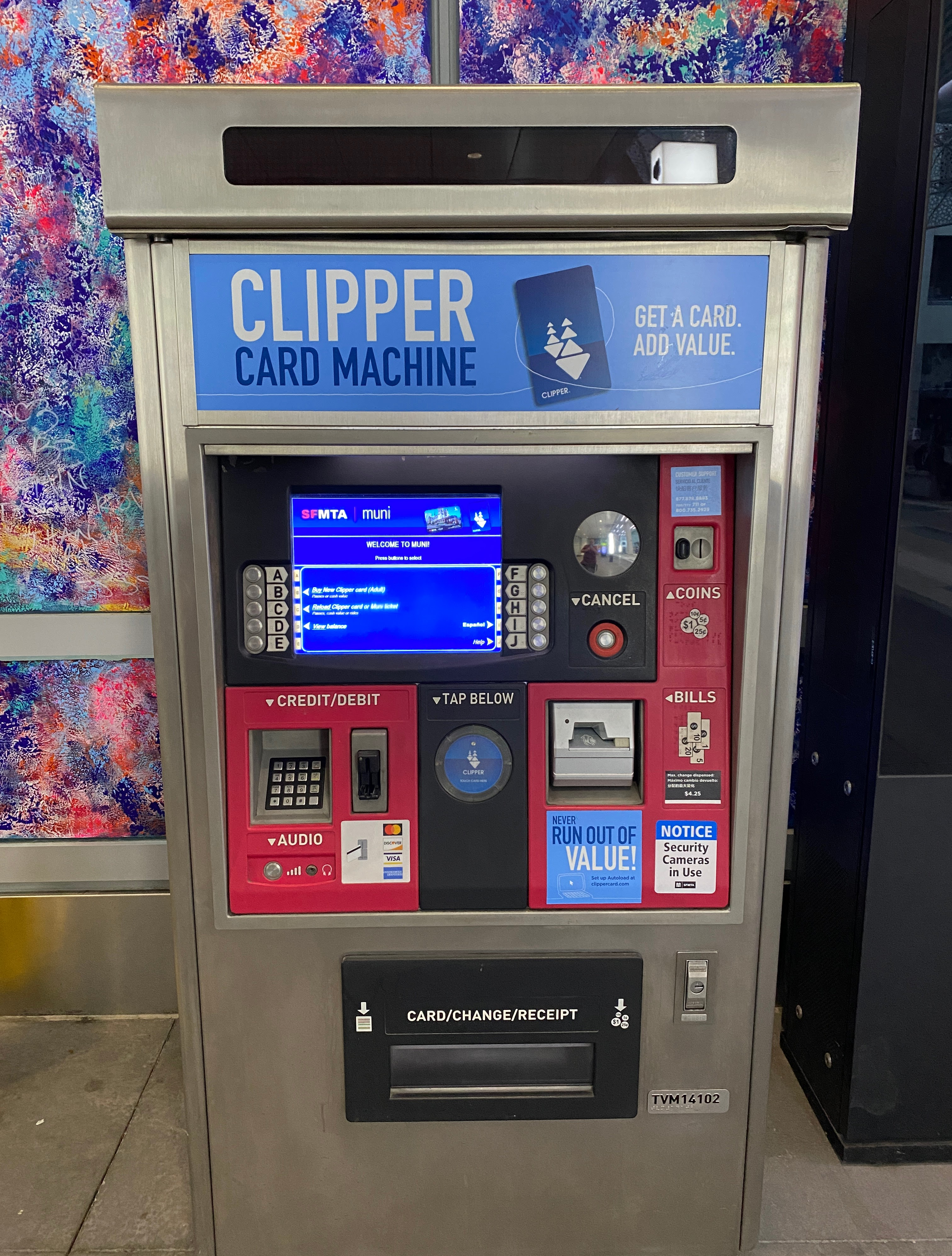
A Clipper card vending machine, used to buy new cards and load transit value and passes, at Salesforce Transit Center.

Passengers can add money and transit passes to their Clipper cards in person ("at participating retailers, participating transit agencies' ticket vending machines and ticket offices, Clipper Customer Service Centers, and Clipper Add Value Machines") at work, automatically, online, or using the Clipper mobile app. While money and passes added in person are available to use immediately, doing the same by telephone, online, or using the mobile app may take 3–5 days to register on a physical Clipper card. Cash value and passes added online or via the mobile app to virtual Clipper cards in Google Pay or Apple Wallet are available for immediate use, except for BART High-Value Discount tickets; these are available by the following day.

=== Contactless payment ===
All transit agencies that accept Clipper also accept contactless payment methods such as credit and debit cards and digital wallets (Apple Pay and Google Pay) using the Clipper fare-reader device.

=== Discount Programs ===
==== Clipper START ====
Since July 2020, the MTC has offered a pilot program called Clipper START that provides a regional reduced fare program with subsidized fares for low-income individuals in the Bay Area. The program originally included four agencies at a variety of discount levels, but as of 2024 currently provides a consistent 50% fare discount on 22 agencies. The program is eligible to residents of the Bay Area who are 19-64 years old, do not have an RTC Clipper card, and who are at or below 200% of the federal poverty level. The users of the program are provided a customized, physical Clipper card that applies the fare discount automatically when used at fare readers. As a pilot program, the MTC has committed to run the discount through June 30, 2025. As of February 2024, the program had about 18,000 active users.

==== Youth and Senior Clipper Card ====
On January 1, 2018, Clipper started offering a Youth Card for Youth 5-18 and a Senior Card for seniors 65 and over with discounts and free rides with exact policies that vary among different agencies using Clipper. By December 19th of the same year, youth usage of BART had increased 260%. The cards are free to apply for, and have no additional cost during use beyond the fares.

==== Clipper Access ====
On December 10, 2025, Clipper started offering a discounted card called Clipper Access (formerly known as RTC) for riders under age 65 that have qualifying disabilities. Clipper Access riders receive 62.5% off BART ticket fares and 50% off other participating agencies. Riders can also use their Clipper Access card as proof of eligibility to receive discount fares on fixed-route, rail and ferry systems throughout the San Francisco Bay Area.

=== Transit services ===
Clipper is currently accepted on 24 transit services, primarily those connecting locations within the nine-county Bay Area:

- AC Transit
- Bay Area Rapid Transit (BART)
- Caltrain
- County Connection
- Dumbarton Express
- FAST
- Golden Gate Bridge, Highway and Transportation District
  - Golden Gate Transit
  - Golden Gate Ferry
- Marin Transit
- Petaluma Transit
- SamTrans
- San Francisco Bay Ferry
- San Francisco Municipal Railway (Muni)
- Santa Clara Valley Transportation Authority (VTA)
- Santa Rosa CityBus
- SolTrans (including SolanoExpress)
- Sonoma County Transit
- Sonoma–Marin Area Rail Transit (SMART)
- Tri-Delta Transit
- Union City Transit
- Vacaville City Coach
- VINE
- WestCAT
- Wheels

Some regional transit agencies which connect the Bay Area to more distant locations have not joined Clipper, including ACE and Rio Vista Delta Breeze. Clipper also is not accepted on Amtrak California's Capitol Corridor or Gold Runner trains, despite these serving the Bay Area.

The fare rules for each participating transit service are set by the agency operating the service, not by Clipper. Each service has differing rules that approximate the fare collection rules used by that service prior to Clipper adoption, and are adapted to the needs of that service. For example, Golden Gate Transit uses a zone-based fare system, so it requires passengers to tag on when boarding and tag off when alighting; in contrast, San Francisco's Muni has a flat fare structure so it only requires that passengers tag on when boarding.

=== Free and discounted transfers ===
Users of contactless payment methods and cards upgraded to the Clipper 2.0 system can, as of December 2025, make transfers between transit services with lower cost compared to the original Clipper system. Riders who transfer are charged a full-fare on the first transit service of a trip, and receive a discount of up to $2.85 on each subsequent leg of the trip within two hours. This includes agencies which previously did not offer transfer discounts, such as AC Transit.

=== Other uses ===
Clipper cards are accepted by Bay Wheels, the Bay Area's bikeshare system, as well as some electronic bicycle lockers operated by BikeLink. For each of these systems, the Clipper card is used not for payment but only as a key; users must have a credit or debit card linked to their Bay Wheels or BikeLink account, and usage fees are charged to this linked payment card, not deducted from the Clipper card's stored value. These systems are not compatible with mobile wallets such as Google Pay or Apple Pay; only physical Clipper cards may be used.

Beginning in 2013, a few parking garages in the Bay Area accepted Clipper for payment as part of a pilot program. Funds used for parking were kept separate from those used for transit. This program was discontinued effective September 1, 2017.

As of August 2025, Clipper cards are accepted by several trial fixed bike locking stations operated by bikeep. As with other similar systems the Clipper is used only as a serial number and not for payment transactions.

== Technology ==
Clipper cards contain an NXP Semiconductors MIFARE DESFire (MF3ICD40) or MIFARE DESFire EV1 (MF3ICD41) integrated circuit inside the card. The card operates on the 13.56 MHz range, putting it into the Near-Field Communication category. Because the card uses NFC technology, any NFC-enabled device can read the serial number, travel history, and current balance on the card.

Because Clipper operates in multiple geographical areas with sporadic or non-existent internet access, the fare collection and verification technology needs to operate without any networking. To accomplish this, the Clipper card memory keeps track of balance on the card, fares paid, and trip history. This also means if funds are added to the Clipper account via the internet, funds will not show up on the Clipper card until it has been tagged at an internet-enabled (or recently synchronized) Clipper payment terminal. Buses and other vehicles without internet access will have to return to a service station in order to synchronize with Clipper's servers. During synchronization, the payment collection device will upload to the server data about any fares collected, and will download information about new funds and passes added online or over the phone. Riders who tag their card at a recently synchronized payment collection device will have their card updated to reflect their true account balance.

The waiting period between synchronizations may cause some cards to report lower funds than are actually on the corresponding Clipper account.

=== Mobile wallets ===
On April 15, 2021, the Clipper mobile app for iOS was released, and Clipper became available in Apple Wallet, joining other transit cards such as Suica, Pasmo, and TAP. Supported devices include iPhone 8 or later and Apple Watch Series 3 or later. Customers can create new virtual Clipper cards or transfer their existing plastic Clipper cards to Apple Wallet by using their iPhone's built-in NFC reader.

On May 19, 2021, the Clipper mobile app was released for Android, and Clipper became available in Google Pay. Phones must have an NFC chip and be running Android 5.0 (Lollipop) or later to be used for mobile payment.

Physical Clipper cards transferred to mobile wallets can no longer be reloaded or used to pay for fares, but will continue to work as keys to unlock Bay Wheels bikes and BikeLink bike lockers (see "§ Other uses" above). TransLink cards cannot be directly transferred to mobile wallets, as they cannot be read by the NFC reader inside a mobile phone. Clipper cards with a San Francisco State University Gator Pass or VTA SmartPass also cannot be transferred to mobile wallets.

== Variants ==
=== Sports ===
Transit cards co-branded with the Golden State Warriors and San Jose Sharks have been produced.

=== Golden Gate Bridge 75th Anniversary ===
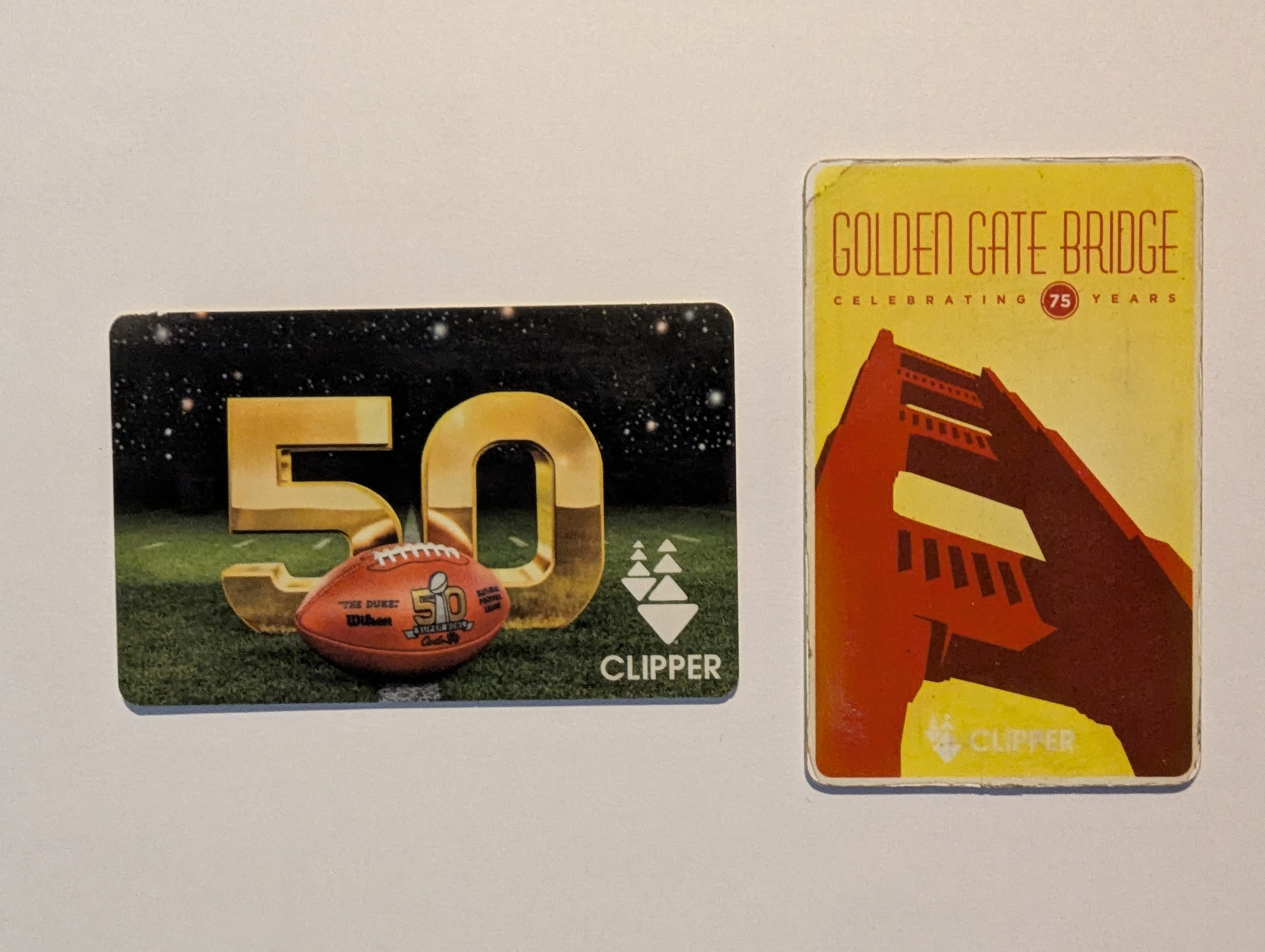
Super Bowl 50 (left) and Golden Gate Bridge (right) commemorative Clipper cards

For the 75th anniversary of the completion of the Golden Gate Bridge, a limited-edition Clipper card was released in 2012, featuring an illustration of one tower.

=== America's Cup ===
During the America's Cup defense held in summer 2013, a limited-edition Clipper card was released featuring an AC72 wingsail catamaran.

=== Bay Bridge New East Span ===
After the eastern span replacement of the San Francisco–Oakland Bay Bridge was completed and opened in November 2013, a limited-edition Clipper card was released featuring an illustration of the new self-anchored "signature" span.

=== Super Bowl 50 ===
With Super Bowl 50 being held at Levi's Stadium in February 2016, Bay Area transit agencies offered for sale three different designs of clipper cards to commemorate the event, all featuring footballs and the Super Bowl 50 logo. These cards were sold at the San Francisco Ferry Building as well as the nearby Embarcadero station.

=== 50th anniversary of BART ===
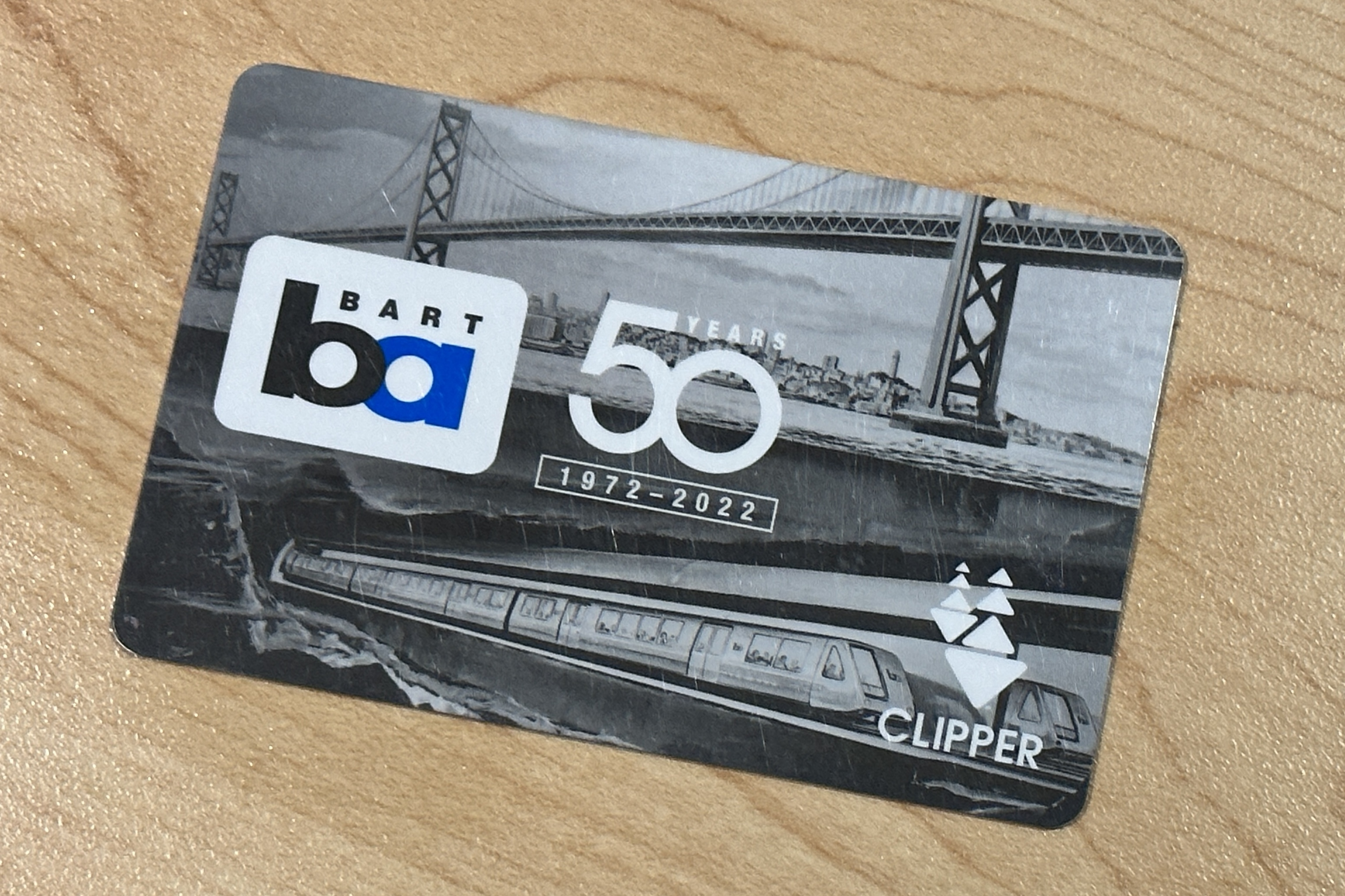
BART's 50th anniversary Clipper card

In 2023, BART launched a 50th Anniversary commemorative Clipper card, available for purchase at Lake Merritt station through a customer service booth or vending machines. The card features a 1970s black and white sketch of the Transbay Tube carrying two BART trains under the Bay Bridge with the city of San Francisco in the background. BART has limited customers to purchasing three at a time from a vending machine and five at a time from the customer service booth.

== See also ==
- List of smart cards
