= Finnila's Finnish Baths =

Bathhouse in San Francisco, California, United States

Finnila's Finnish Baths—a.k.a. Finnila's—was a Finnish bathhouse and a health club in San Francisco, California. It served the general public from circa 1910 to September, 2000. Finnila's was located in the Castro District of San Francisco for its first 75 years.

== Migration from Finland ==
In 1902, Matti Finnila (Finnish spelling: Finnilä) – born August 23, 1885 –, the future founder of Finnila's Finnish Baths, immigrated from Kalajoki, Finland to Los Angeles, California. In Los Angeles, Matti Finnila learned the skill of bricklaying. In 1906, the San Francisco earthquake inspired Matti Finnila to move to San Francisco, to help rebuild the city.

In San Francisco, Matti Finnila met Alexandra (Sandra) Lantta from Ullava, Finland. The couple married and settled to live in the San Francisco's heavily Finnish-populated Castro District. Matti Finnila became a "brick building contractor" in 1910 (1910–1933) and in 1913 he opened a Finnish-style sauna club, Finnila's Finnish Baths, for the general public. It was the "first Finnish steam bath" business in the San Francisco Bay Area.

In 1932, Finnila's continued business at a new, large bathhouse on San Francisco's Market Street, one block westbound from the previous location. A study published in 1949, written by Oskari Tokoi, John Suominen and Henry Askeli, described Finnila's as the "most modern & largest steam bath in U.S.". In 1977, the San Francisco magazine pointed out that Finnila's was "the oldest and most well-known of all Bay Area baths", and "for many years it was the only non-gay bathhouse available".

== Four locations of Finnila's in San Francisco ==
The first sauna of the Finnila family in San Francisco at 9 Douglass Street became a local attraction in the early 1910s. The sauna was built in the back yard of the small wood-structured Victorian building, which the Finnilas owned and where they lived. At the start, the sauna was used mainly by the Finnila family, friends and neighbors. However, the word spread, and in 1913 the Finnilas registered their service as a business and began accepting paying customers from the general public. The next-door neighbor at 5 Douglass made wine and would sell it over the fence to sauna patrons. But, due to popular demand, the Finnila family decided to expand the bathhouse business and to move to a larger space and in more central location.

Finnila's opened a new bathhouse - Finnila's Finnish Baths - at 4032 17th Street in 1919, a half block west from the busy Castro Street. The Finnila family owned the entire 3-4 floor building, where the sauna facilities were built in the basement. There were two large traditional Finnish-style sauna-bathing rooms, one for women and another one for men. Both the women's and the men's sauna could accommodate about a dozen customers at a time. Throwing water on the hot rocks provided the hot steam for the baths. There were large shower and dressing rooms separately for the ladies and for the men. There were also separate women's and men's massage rooms, also in the basement of the building. At busy times, additional rooms from the upper floor were used to accommodate the massage customers.

The popularity of the Finnila's services prompted the Finnila family to expand the business even further. In 1932, Matti and Alexandra Finnila's son Alfred Finnila completed the construction of a large new Finnila's Finnish Baths bathhouse building on San Francisco's busy Market Street, at the corner of Noe Street. The new bathhouse at 2284 Market Street was designed by Alfred Finnila himself.

The bathhouse had large women's and men's public saunas, accessible from the lobby area, and smaller private saunas, accessible from labyrinth-style long hallways. There was also a large private sauna - sauna No. 21 -, known as "family sauna". Every morning c. 6 am, natural gas fires were lit on burners located along the hallways, on the walls, close to the floor level. Each burner threw a powerful flame into a pipeline, approximately three inch thick by diameter, which led underneath the hot rocks of a sauna. This design and method used for the heating of the saunas was unique.

In the mid-1980s, the Finnila's Market Street bathhouse provided employment to a total of c. 65 employees, most of whom worked part-time. About 40 of these employees were certified masseuses and masseurs, who each worked anywhere between one and five work shifts per week. The bathhouse was open daily from 10 am to 11 pm (Sundays, from 8 am to 2 pm), providing both day- and night-shifts for its employees.

Despite public outcry and attempts to prevent the closing of the popular Finnila's Market Street bathhouse, the old bathhouse building was demolished by the owners, Alfred Finnila and his sister Edna Jeffrey, soon after the farewell party held in the end of December 1985. Today, Edna Jeffrey is the main partner in the newly constructed Market & Noe Center, which was built in place of the old bathhouse, next to Cafe Flore, at the intersection of Market and Noe Streets.

After having served customers for over seven decades in the San Francisco's Castro District, the fourth and final location of Finnila's, Finnila's Health Club, opened for the general public in 1986 at 645 Taraval Street in the San Francisco's Sunset District. Hereafter, Finnila's was open only for women. The services included sauna-bathing, massage, aerobics and other health-related services. In the fall of 2000, Finnila's Health Club was shut down, due to retirement of Alfred Finnila.

== Finnila's in a novel by Svevanne Auerbach ==
The Contest, a novel by Stevanne Auerbach, mentions the Market Street bathhouse. It calls Finnila's "a unique, much-needed hideaway, a steamy oasis in the heart of the city." According to Auerbach, "the place was kept spotless."

== Awards and recognition ==
Still shortly before closing its popular Market Street location in San Francisco in the 1980s, Finnila's Finnish Baths was awarded the title "The Best" two times in row by the popular bi-weekly and free San Francisco Bay Area entertainment magazine San Francisco Bay Guardian. According to the paper, Finnila's was "The Best Sauna and Massage Parlor" in the San Francisco Bay Area.

- 1983 - "The Best Sauna and Massage Parlor".
- 1984 - "The Best Sauna and Massage Parlor".

== In popular culture ==
Director Don Siegel filmed the final scenes of the 1971 movie Dirty Harry on the Larkspur Landing area owned by Alfred Finnila — owner of Finnila's Finnish Baths — as well as the adjacent East Sir Francis Drake Boulevard in Larkspur, California. After hijacking a school bus, the character of "Scorpio" — played by Andy Robinson — drives into East Sir Francis Drake Boulevard at the Greenbrae interchange, before crashing into the site of the Hutchinson Company quarry. During the filming of Dirty Harry, the movie crew — including the actor Clint Eastwood — visited Finnila's Finnish Baths in San Francisco for sauna bathing and for massage.

== Other projects by Alfred Finnila ==
Upon completing the construction of the Finnila's Finnish Baths building on San Francisco's Market Street, which he had designed, Alfred Finnila participated in the construction of Golden Gate Bridge from January 5, 1932, to May 1937. As an engineering draftsman, Finnila started at the bridge work as a timekeeper, but was later promoted to oversee the entire ironing work and half of the road work of the bridge. Aside from Joseph B. Strauss, the bridge's chief architect, Finnila's role in the bridge construction has been described as possibly the most significant.

Alfred Finnila's works also include the designing of the famous Round House Café diner, which opened in 1938 at the southeastern end of Golden Gate Bridge, adjacent to the tourist plaza which was renovated in 2012. Round House Café became the all time busiest San Francisco Bay Area restaurant, before it was turned to an unofficial gift shop and a visitor center. Thereafter, Round House Café served for a long time as a starting point for countless San Francisco Bay Area tours. In 2012, a renovation work of Round House Café was completed and it was revealed as a suave Art Deco treat - a diner -, as Alfred Finnila had designed it. The gift shop was removed as a new, official gift shop was built in the adjacent plaza renovations.

== See also ==
- Aræotic
- Balneotherapy
- Banya
- Bathtub
- Body treatment
- Contrast shower
- Hot spring
- Hot tub
- Hydrotherapy
- Mud bath
- Onsen
- Public bathing
- Purification Rundown
- Spa
- Steam room
- Steam shower
- Sudatorium
- Taiwanese hot springs
- Temazcal
- Thermae
- Thermal bath
- Victorian Turkish baths
- World Sauna Championships
