= MV Del Norte =

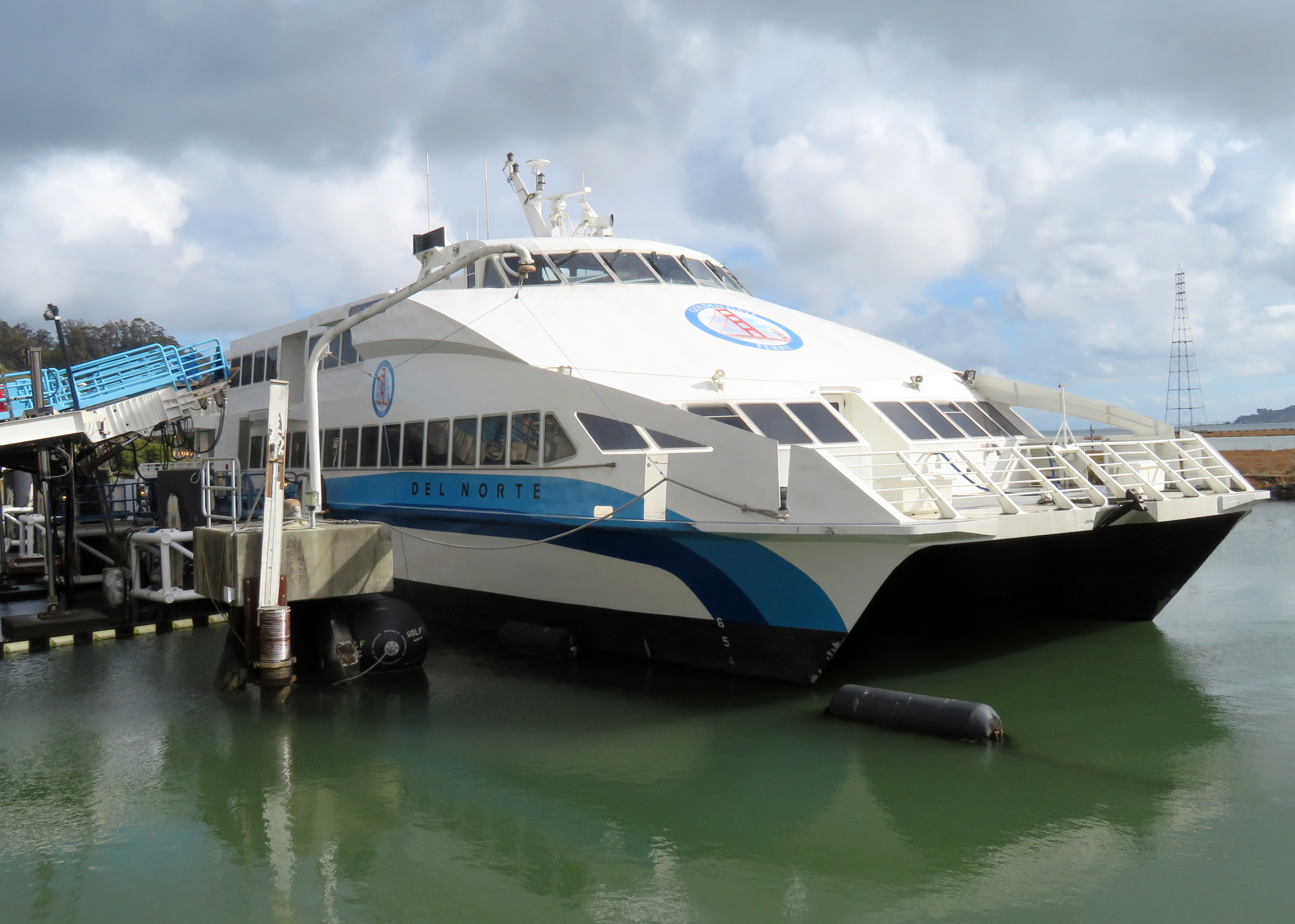
- Del Norte at Larkspur Landing in November 2018

History
- Name: M/V Del Norte
- Owner: Golden Gate Bridge, Highway and Transportation District
- Operator: Golden Gate Ferry
- Port of registry: Larkspur, California, United States
- Acquired: 1998
- Identification: IMO number: 8967838; MMSI number: 366990520; Callsign: WDC2280
- Status: Active

General characteristics
- Length: 135 ft 4 in (41.2 m)
- Beam: 39 ft 4 in (12.0 m)
- Draft: 5 ft (1.5 m).
- Propulsion: Waterjet
- Speed: 36 kn (67 km/h)
- Capacity: 390 passengers

MV Del Norte is a passenger-only fast ferry operated by Golden Gate Ferries.

The vessel is named after Del Norte County, one of the member counties of the Golden Gate Bridge, Highway and Transportation District. The Del Norte was designed by Advanced Multi-Hull and built by Dakota Creek in Port Anacortes, WA. It was the first catamaran placed into service by Golden Gate Ferry on September 8, 1998. This significant milestone offered customers new commute options, including more frequent trips, better departure times, and faster crossings. The addition of the Del Norte to the Larkspur Ferry fleet nearly doubled the number of daily round trips available to customers - to 40 trips per day up from 26. The high-speed catamaran was an instant hit, increasing ridership by 11%.

The Del Norte was scheduled to undergo an engine replacement in June 2009. During that time, it was replaced by the MV Napa.
