= Passenger-Only Fast Ferry-class ferry =

The Passenger-Only Fast Ferry, also known as the Chinook class, are ferries built by Dakota Creek Industries in Anacortes, Washington for Washington State Ferries beginning in 1998. They are unique in the system for being propelled by water jets rather than traditional propellers. With these jets, they travel at the very high speed of 38 knots.

There was opposition to the ferries due to allegations of beach erosion in Rich Passage caused by their wake. The state settled these claims for $4.5 million in 2002.

In 2009, both vessels were sold to Golden Gate Ferries which uses them on the San Francisco - Marin County run.

The Passenger-Only Fast Ferry Class ferries include:

- MV Golden Gate (Formerly MV Chinook)
- MV Napa (Formerly MV Snohomish)
