= MV Napa =

Passenger ferry in Bay Area, California, US

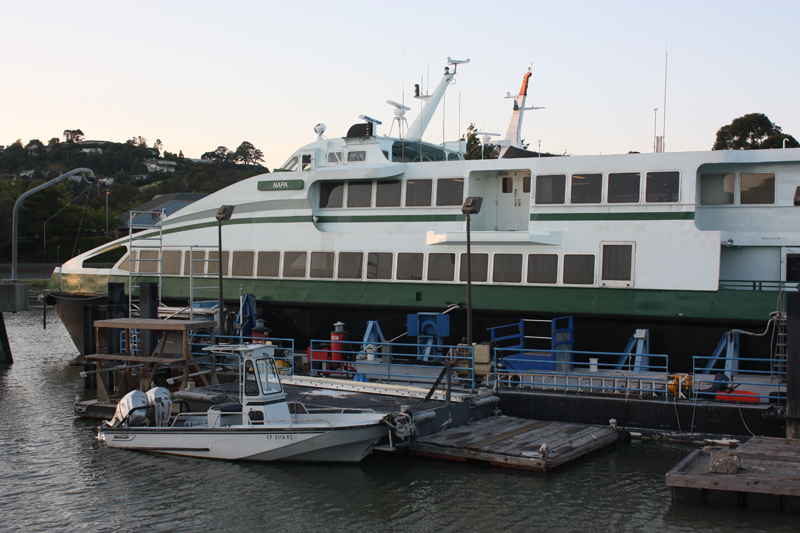

History
- Name: MV Snohomish; MV Napa
- Owner: Golden Gate Bridge, Highway and Transportation District
- Operator: Golden Gate Ferry
- Port of registry: Larkspur, California, United States
- Completed: 1999
- Acquired: 2009
- Identification: IMO number: 8643004; MMSI number: 366771550; Official Number: D1084026; Call Sign: WDE8110
- Status: Retired by Washington State Ferries, acquired by Golden Gate Ferry, refitted; in service 2009-present (2021).

General characteristics
- Length: 143 ft 3 in (43.7 m)
- Beam: 39 ft 4 in (12.0 m)
- Draft: 5 ft (1.5 m).
- Installed power: Total 7,200 hp from 4 diesel engines
- Propulsion: Waterjet
- Speed: 30 kn (56 km/h)
- Capacity: 350 passengers
- Notes: Previously M/V Snohomish

MV Napa (2009 – present, previously MV Snohomish) is a passenger-only fast ferry operated by Golden Gate Ferry in the northern Bay Area in California, United States.

The vessel is named after Napa County, one of the member counties of the Golden Gate Bridge, Highway and Transportation District. Napa was purchased in 2009 from Washington State Ferries (along with MV Chinook) and entered service with Golden Gate Transit after a refit. The Napa entered service as a substitute for MV Del Norte when that vessel began undergoing an engine replacement in June 2009. After Chinook returned from its refit, Napa went in for a full refitting.

Previously, as Snohomish, it was mothballed for years at the WSF Shipyard at Eagle Harbor, Bainbridge Island. Washington State Ferries announced that she was returned to service in November 2007 to replace Klickitat on the Keystone-Port Townsend run.
