= Translink =

Translink (or TransLink) may refer to:

- TransLink (British Columbia), the public transport operator in Vancouver, Canada
- Translink (Northern Ireland), the public transport operator in Northern Ireland
- Translink (Queensland), the public transport operator in Queensland, Australia
- TransLink, the original name of the San Francisco Clipper automated fare collection card
