= Round House Café =

Café in San Francisco, United States

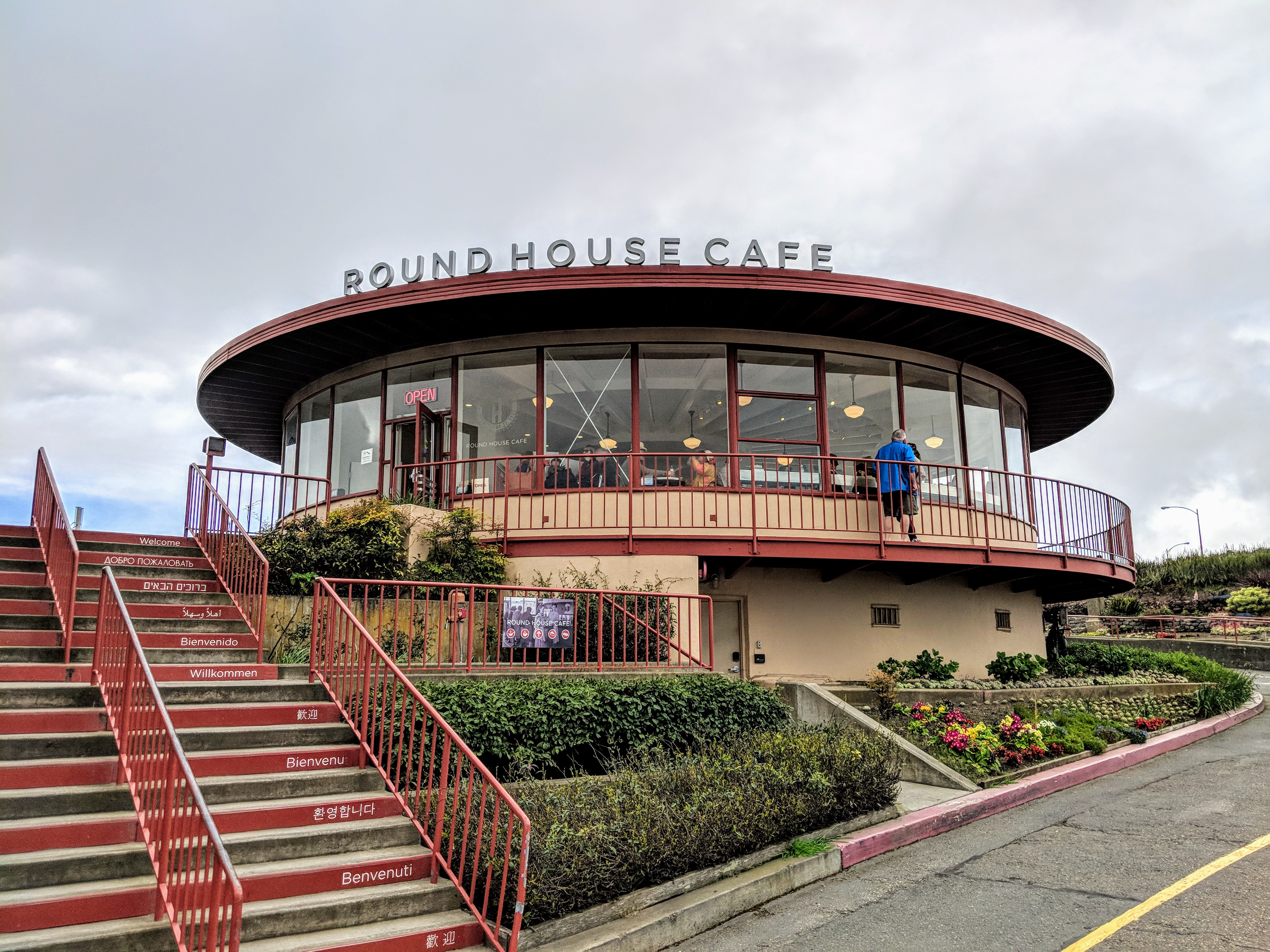
- Interactive map of Round House Café

Restaurant information
- Established: 1938
- Location: San Francisco, California, 94129, United States
- Coordinates: 37°48′28″N 122°28′32″W

Round House Café is a cafe and diner in the Presidio of San Francisco, California next to the Golden Gate Bridge.

== History ==
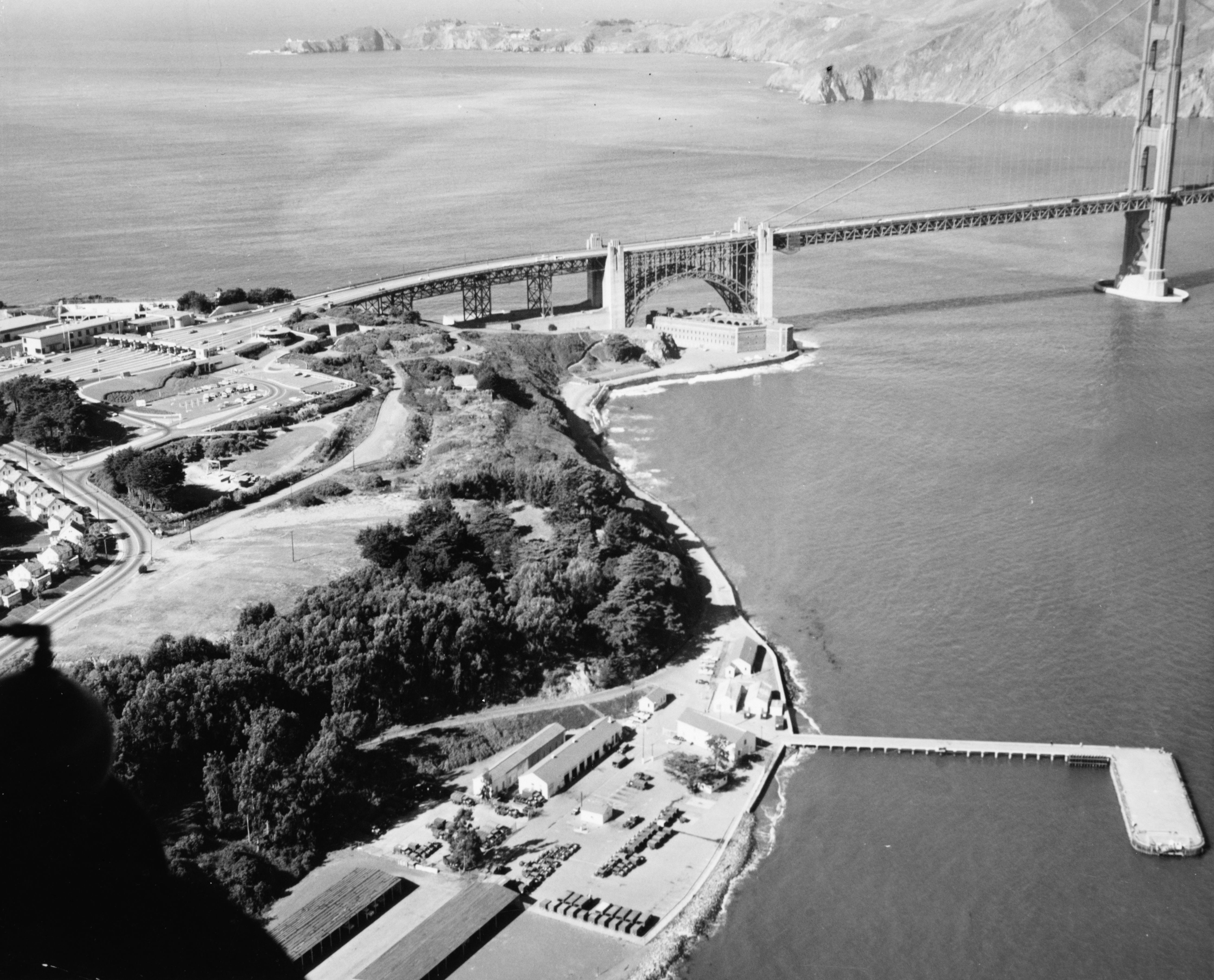
Round House Café seen next to the Golden Gate Bridge

Built in 1938, one year after the Golden Gate Bridge was completed, Round House Café is one of the oldest restaurants in the Bay Area. It is a circular Art Deco building built by Finnish-American architect Alfred Finnila and overlooks the bay.

In 2021, a local coffee company, Equator Coffees, leased the site. The diner was renovated in 2012 and the gift shop was then removed as a new, official gift shop has been included in the adjacent plaza renovations.

== See also ==
- Presidio of San Francisco
