= Golden Gate Ferry =

Transport company in the United States

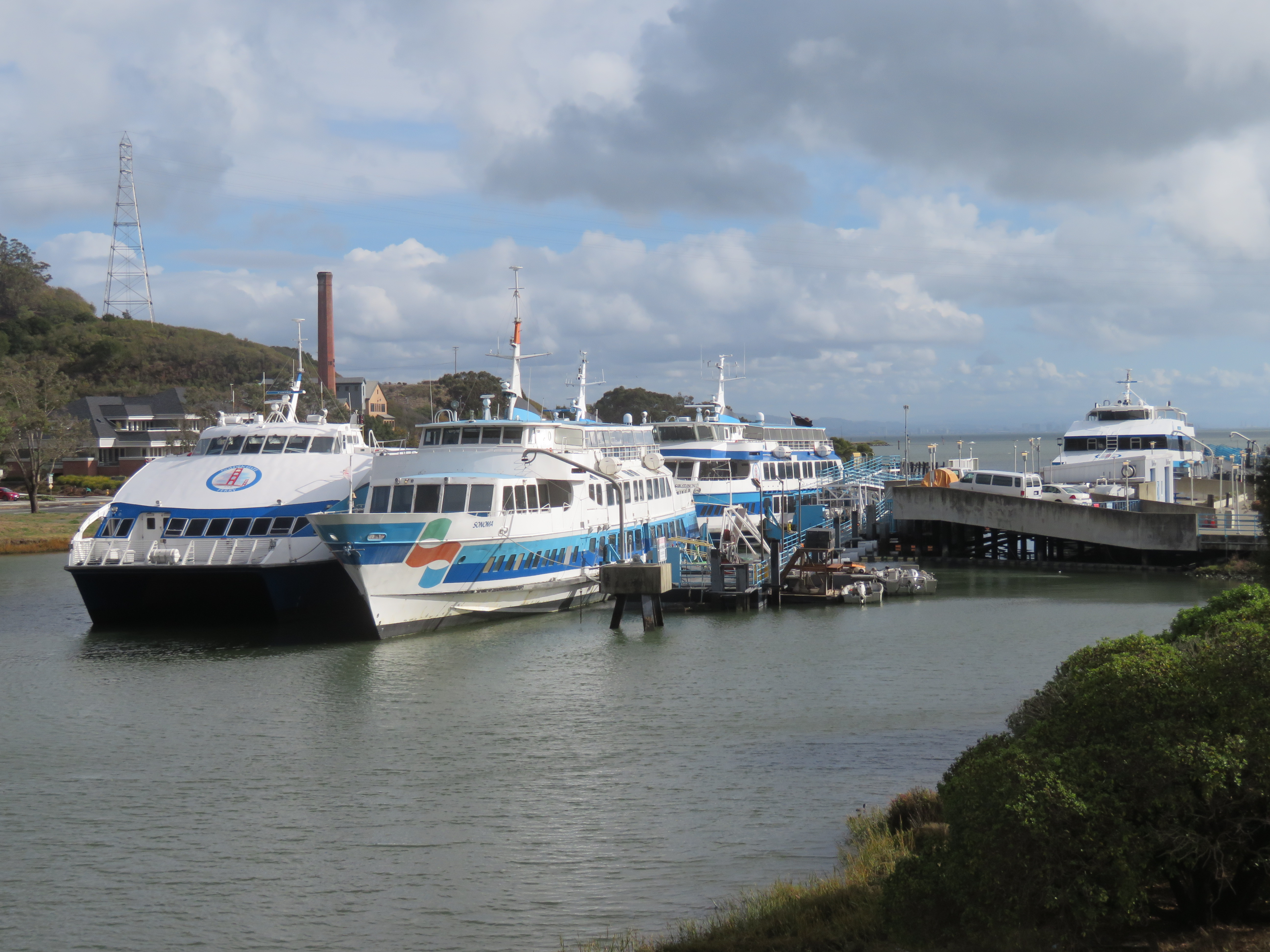
- Four of the system's ferries at the Larkspur Landing headquarters
- Locale: Marin County, San Francisco
- Waterway: San Francisco Bay (North Bay)
- Transit type: Passenger ferry
- Operator: Golden Gate Bridge, Highway and Transportation District
- Began operation: August 15, 1970
- No. of lines: 5 (plus 2 special)
- No. of vessels: 7
- No. of terminals: 6
- Daily ridership: 6,200 (weekdays, Q2 2026)
- Yearly ridership: 1,623,600 (2025)
- Website: goldengate.org/ferry

Golden Gate Ferry is a commuter ferry service operated by the Golden Gate Bridge, Highway and Transportation District in San Francisco Bay, part of the Bay Area of Northern California, United States. Regular service is run to the Ferry Building in San Francisco from Larkspur, Sausalito, Tiburon, and Angel Island in Marin County, with additional service from Larkspur to Oracle Park and Chase Center. The ferry service is funded primarily by passenger fares and Golden Gate Bridge tolls. In 2025, Golden Gate Ferry had a ridership of 1,623,600, or about 6,200 per weekday as of the second quarter of 2026.

Golden Gate Ferry is a different system from San Francisco Bay Ferry, which provides passenger ferry service between San Francisco and counties other than Marin.

== History ==
Golden Gate Ferry began service between San Francisco and Sausalito on August 15, 1970, with MS Golden Gate. Service to Larkspur started in 1976. Service to Pacific Bell Park (now Oracle Park) started in 2000. Tiburon service began on March 6, 2017, replacing service that had been run by Blue & Gold Fleet and other private operators since 1962. Service to Chase Center began in 2019 using an interim terminal located at Pier 48½. A permanent Mission Bay terminal is expected to open in 2021 at the foot of 16th Street to replace the nearby interim Chase Center terminal. The agency began operating ferries to Angel Island in December 2021.

== Routes ==
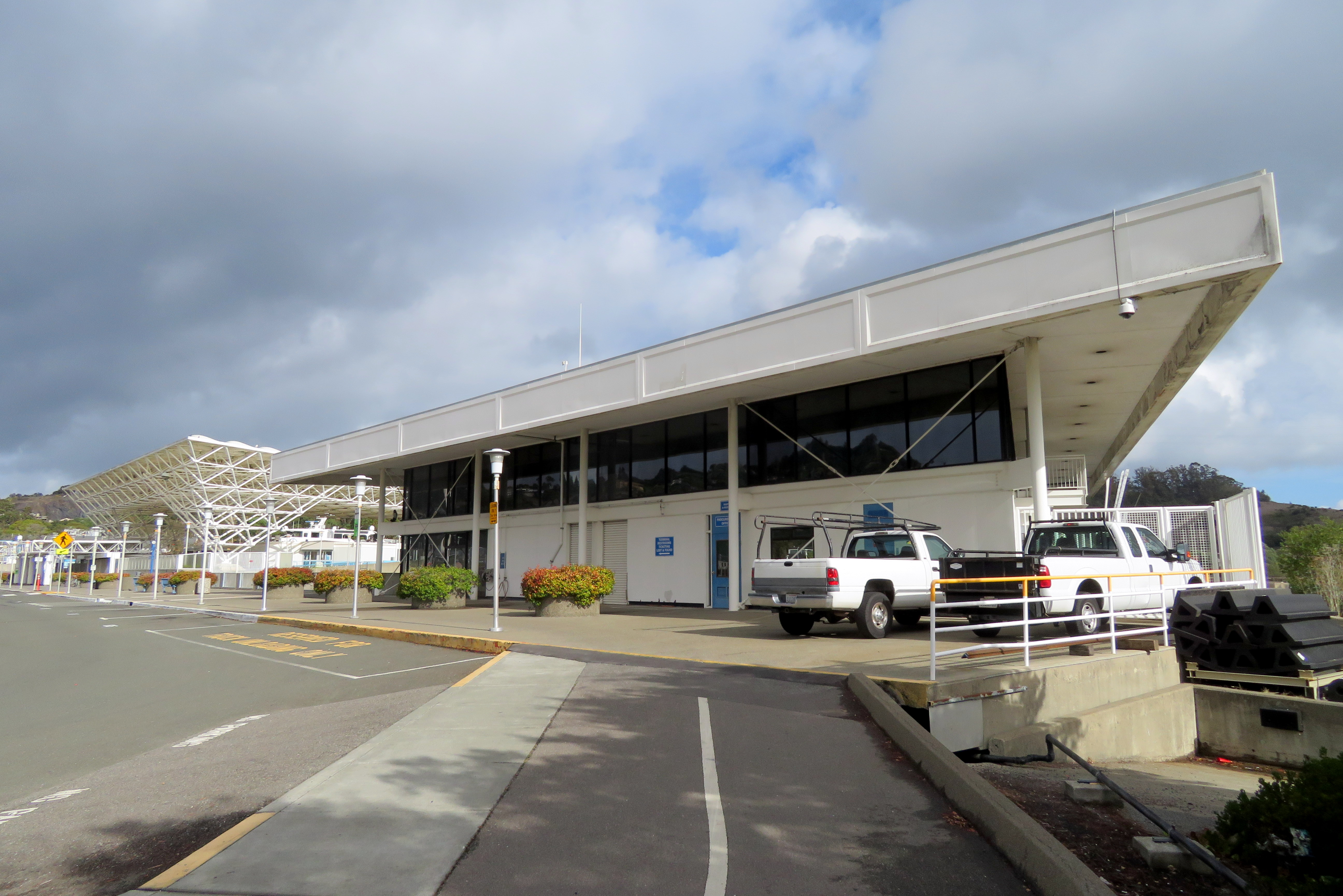
Golden Gate Ferry headquarters at Larkspur Landing.

Golden Gate Ferry operates regular passenger ferry service on four routes:

- Larkspur Landing – San Francisco Ferry Building
- Sausalito Ferry Terminal – San Francisco Ferry Building
- Tiburon Ferry Terminal – San Francisco Ferry Building
- Angel Island – San Francisco Ferry Building

Limited service operates from Larkspur to Oracle Park for San Francisco Giants baseball home games and from Larkspur to Chase Center for Golden State Warriors basketball home games. Supplemental service is provided for special events.

== Fares and transfers ==
Golden Gate Ferry fares differ by route, passenger type, and method of payment. As of October 2025, fares are as follows:

Route	Fares			
Route	Adult Single Ride	Adult Clipper Card	Youth / Senior / Disabled / Medicare	Clipper START
Larkspur - Ferry Building	$14.00	$9.25	$7.00	$4.65
Sausalito - Ferry Building	$14.00	$8.25	$7.00	$4.15
Tiburon - Ferry Building	$14.00	$8.25	$7.00	$4.15
Angel Island - Ferry Building	$15.50	$9.75	$8.00	$5.65
Larkspur - Chase Center	$15.00			
Larkspur - Oracle Park	$16.00			

Transfer discounts are available to/from Golden Gate Transit, Marin Transit, Muni, and SMART for Clipper card users.

== Fleet ==
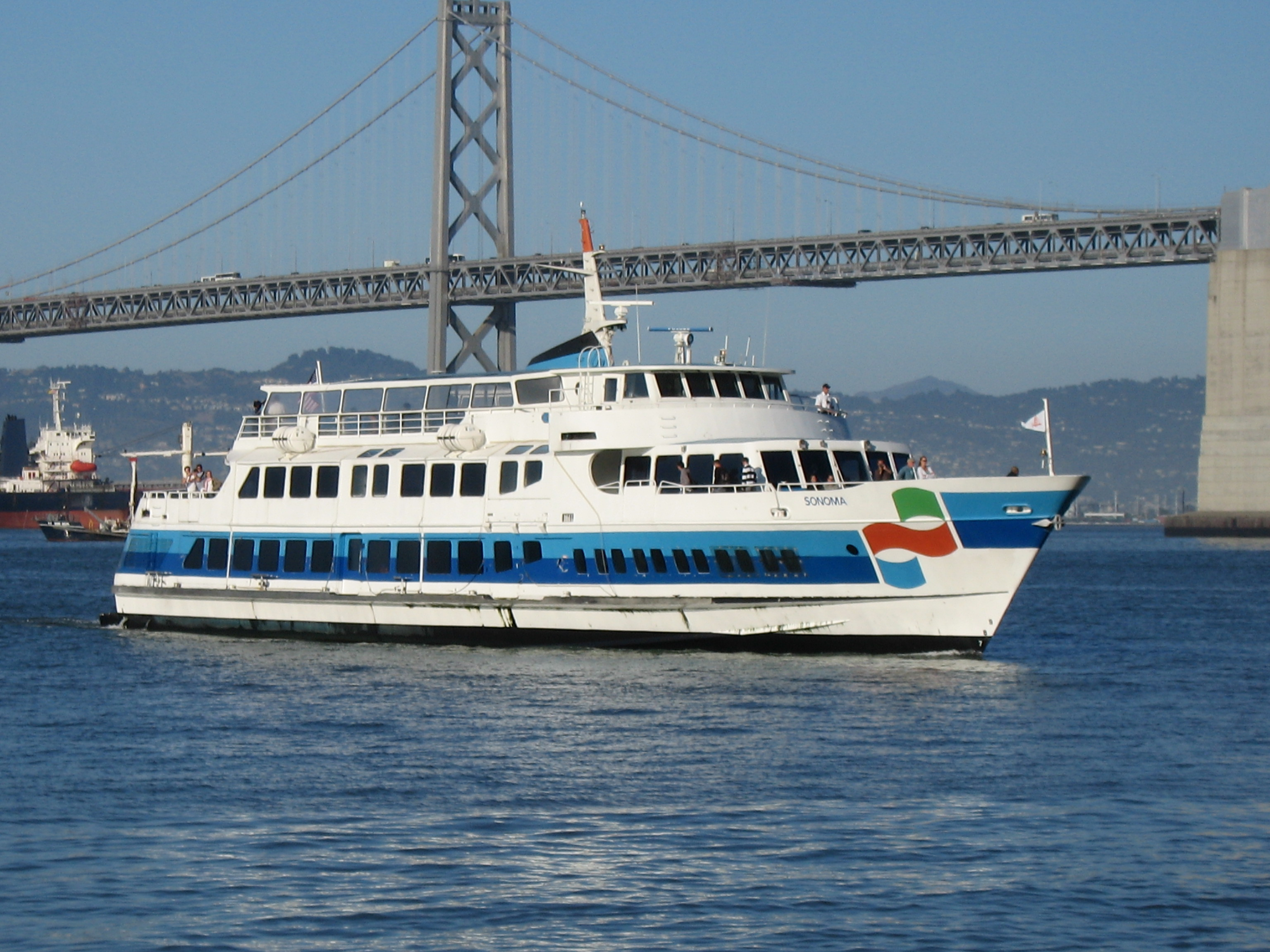
MS Sonoma crosses San Francisco Bay

Golden Gate Ferry has a fleet of four catamarans and three monohull vessels. All ferries are wheelchair accessible. The catamarans can carry 30 bicycles, and the monohull vessels can carry 150 bicycles. All ferries have restrooms and on-board refreshments, including a full bar.

The monohull vessels are named MS Marin, MS San Francisco, and MS Sonoma. Marin can carry 750 passengers, and San Francisco and Sonoma can carry 630 passengers each. They were purchased from Philip F. Spaulding & Associates in San Diego in 1976–1977. They were originally powered by gas turbine water jets but were converted to diesel engine propeller drives in 1983–1985. More efficient diesel engines were installed in 2001–2002. The Marin was refurbished from November 2006 to July 2007.

The catamarans are named MV Del Norte, MV Golden Gate, MV Mendocino, and MV Napa. Del Norte has a capacity of 400 passengers while the other three vessels have a capacity of 450 passengers. The 1998-built Del Norte and 2001-built Mendocino were built for Golden Gate Ferry to allow faster and more frequent service than the monohull ferries. Napa (formerly Snohomish) and Golden Gate (formerly Chinook) were purchased from Washington State Ferries in January 2009.

In late 2018, Golden Gate Ferry reached an agreement to lease MV Millennium from Rhode Island Fast Ferry for one year for $2.5 million. Millennium allowed full service to continue while Marin and Sonoma underwent major work and the other ferries received regular maintenance. The Millennium remained in service until 2020 before returning to Rhode Island.

When MS Golden Gate retired in 2004, it had made 42,108 round trips between Sausalito and San Francisco, carried 21 million passengers, and traveled nearly 1.3 million nautical miles (2,400,000 km; 1,500,000 mi).
