= Larkspur Landing =

Ferry terminal in Larkspur, California

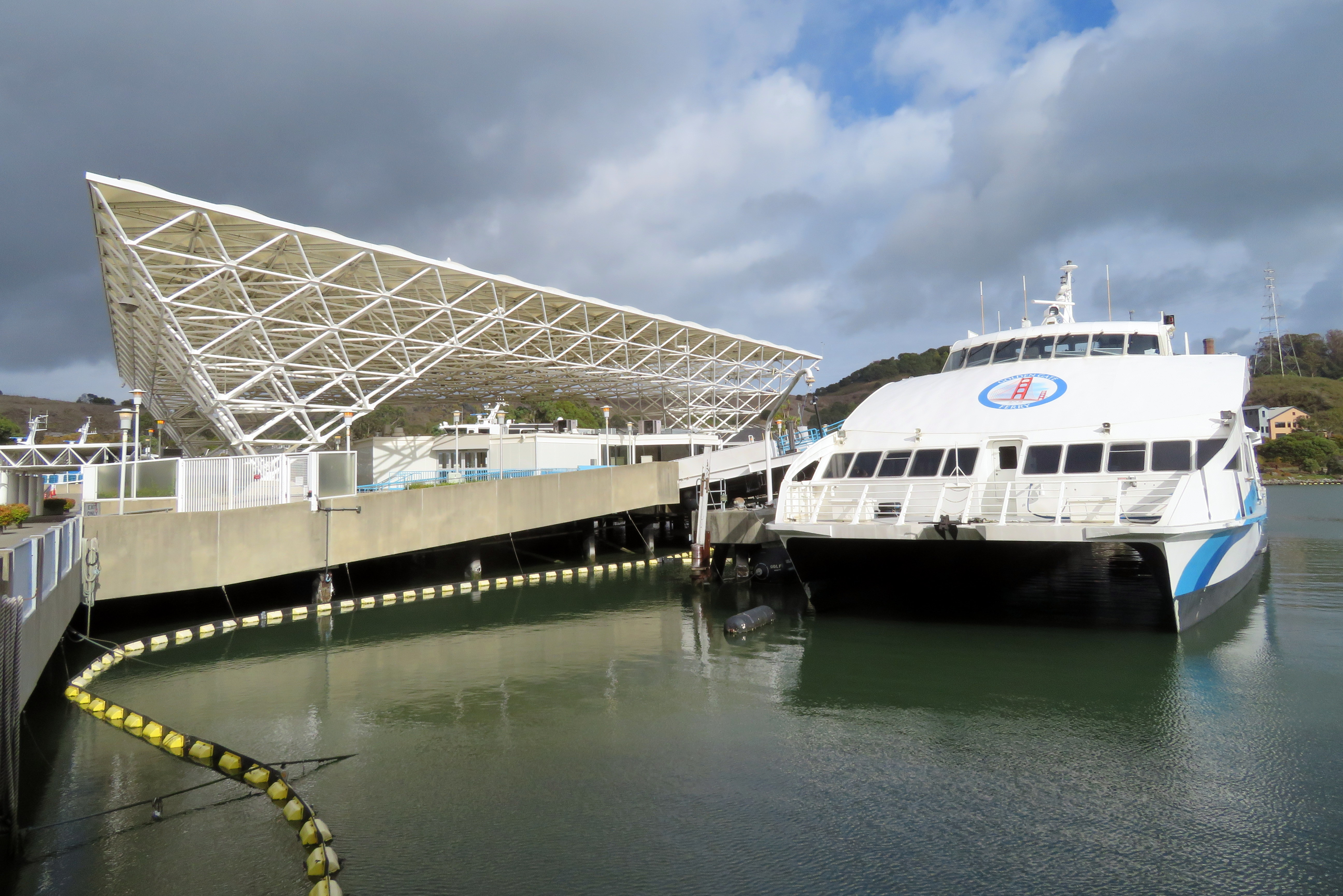
- MV Del Norte at Larkspur Landing in November 2018

General information
- Location: 101 East Sir Francis Drake Boulevard; Larkspur, California
- Coordinates: 37.945°N 122.509°W
- Owner: Golden Gate Bridge, Highway and Transportation District
- Operator: Golden Gate Ferry
- Connections: Sonoma–Marin Area Rail Transit (at Larkspur station); Golden Gate Transit: 132; Marin Transit: 17, 29, 228; SMART Connect

Construction
- Parking: Yes
- Architect: Jacques de Brer

History
- Opened: December 11, 1976
Location

Larkspur Landing, also known as Larkspur Ferry Terminal, is the main Golden Gate Ferry terminal in Larkspur, California, United States, in Marin County, north of San Francisco. The terminal is a regional hub receiving heavy service from throughout the North Bay for commuter ferries south to downtown San Francisco.

== History ==
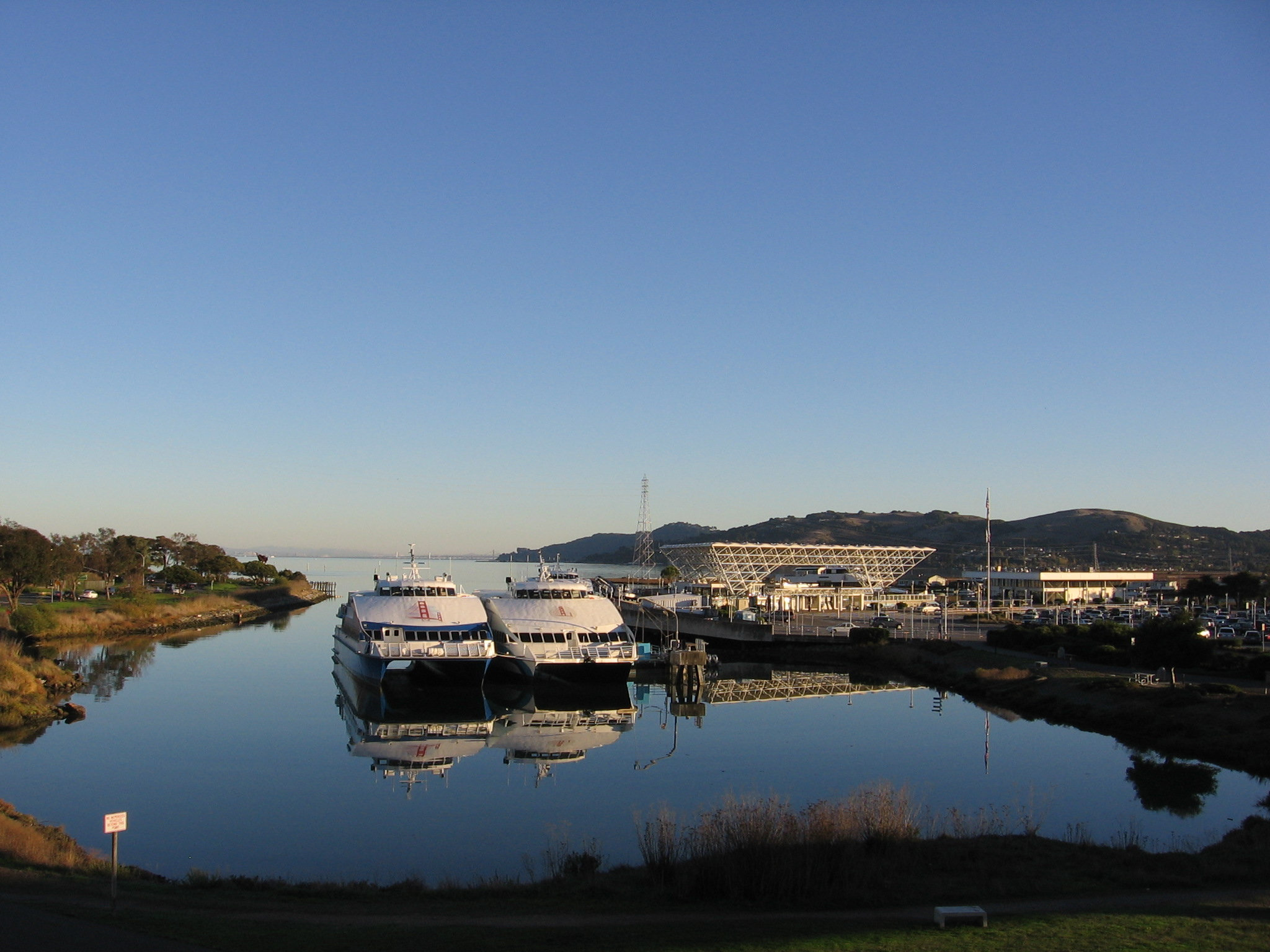
Larkspur Landing at dusk on a Sunday

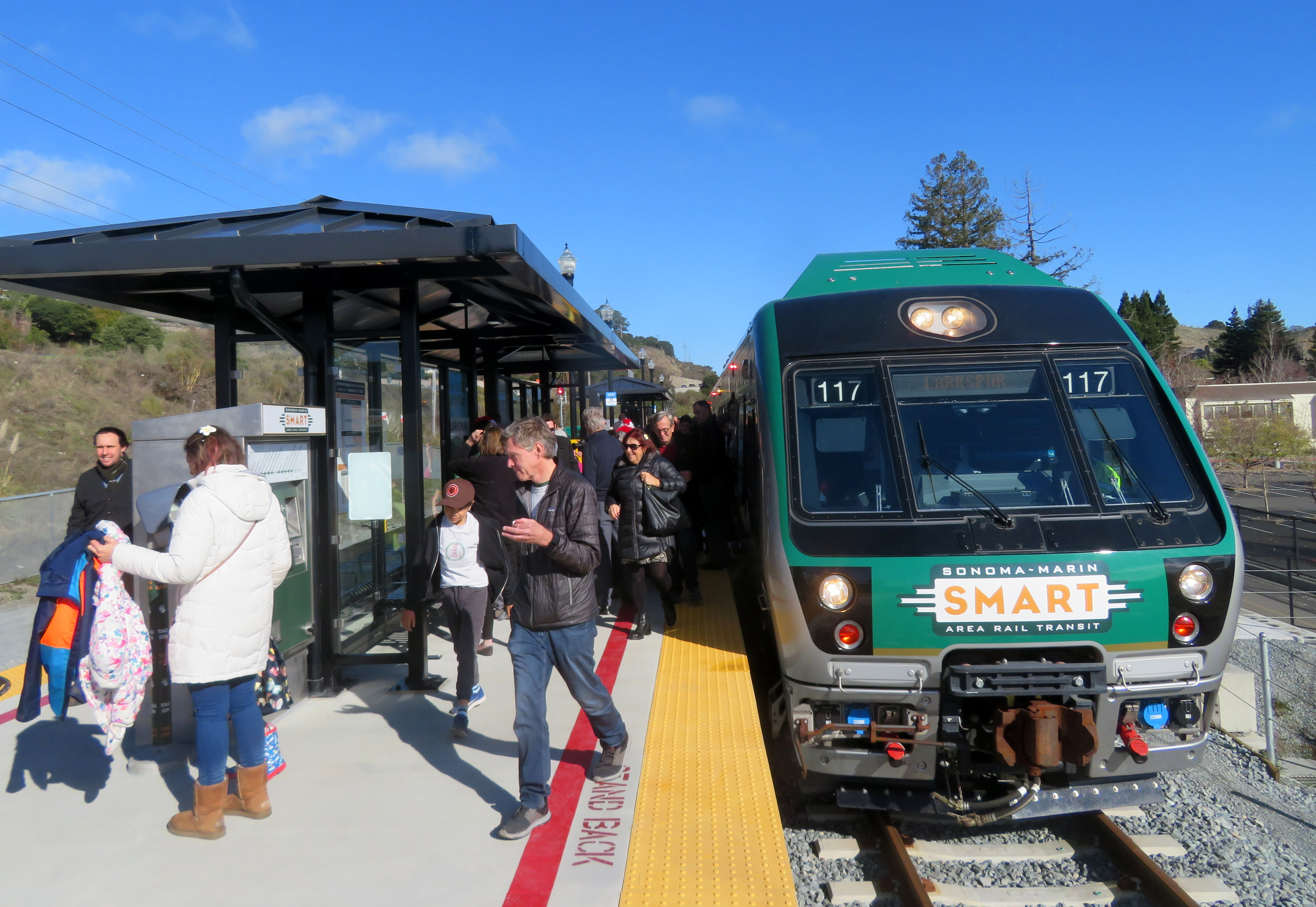
Nearby Larkspur station in December 2019

Among various San Francisco Bay Area properties owned by San Francisco-born civil engineer Alfred Finnila in the 1970s was the area known as Larkspur Landing in Marin County. In the mid-1970s, Finnila sold, leased and rented parts of Larkspur Landing to the City of Larkspur and to various businesses, including the restaurant chain of Victoria Station.

The part of the area sold to the City of Larkspur by Alfred Finnila, to be used as a major Marin County ferry terminal, is today known both as Larkspur Landing and as Larkspur Ferry Terminal. It is the main Golden Gate Ferry terminal in Larkspur, Marin County. The ferry service operates daily with a Marin - San Francisco schedule tailored to both commuters and visitors.

Constructed in the mid-1970s, Larkspur Ferry Terminal occupied the site of the demolished Hutchinson's Rock Quarry, itself the former site of the Green Brae Brick Yard. The Ferry Terminal was built with an 18,000-square-foot (1,700 m^{2}) open air space frame, or tetrahedral-octahedral tesselation, a canopy designed by architect Jacques de Brer. The Ferry Terminal opened on December 11, 1976, and regular commute service started two days later. The ex-quarry-property also spawned the Larkspur Landing Shopping Center (now Marin Country Mart), with adjacent apartments and office space.

Sonoma–Marin Area Rail Transit terminates at Larkspur station, located near the ferry terminal. It serves as an intermodal station, where passengers can transfer to San Francisco-bound ferries after a 1/3 mile (0.5 km) walk. The station opened for service on December 14, 2019.

=== In popular culture ===
Director Don Siegel filmed the final scenes of the 1971 movie Dirty Harry in the vicinity of Larkspur Landing and at the adjacent East Sir Francis Drake Boulevard. After hijacking a school bus, the character of "Scorpio" - played by Andy Robinson - drives into East Sir Francis Drake Boulevard at the Greenbrae interchange, before crashing into the site of the Hutchinson Company quarry.
