= Aræotic =

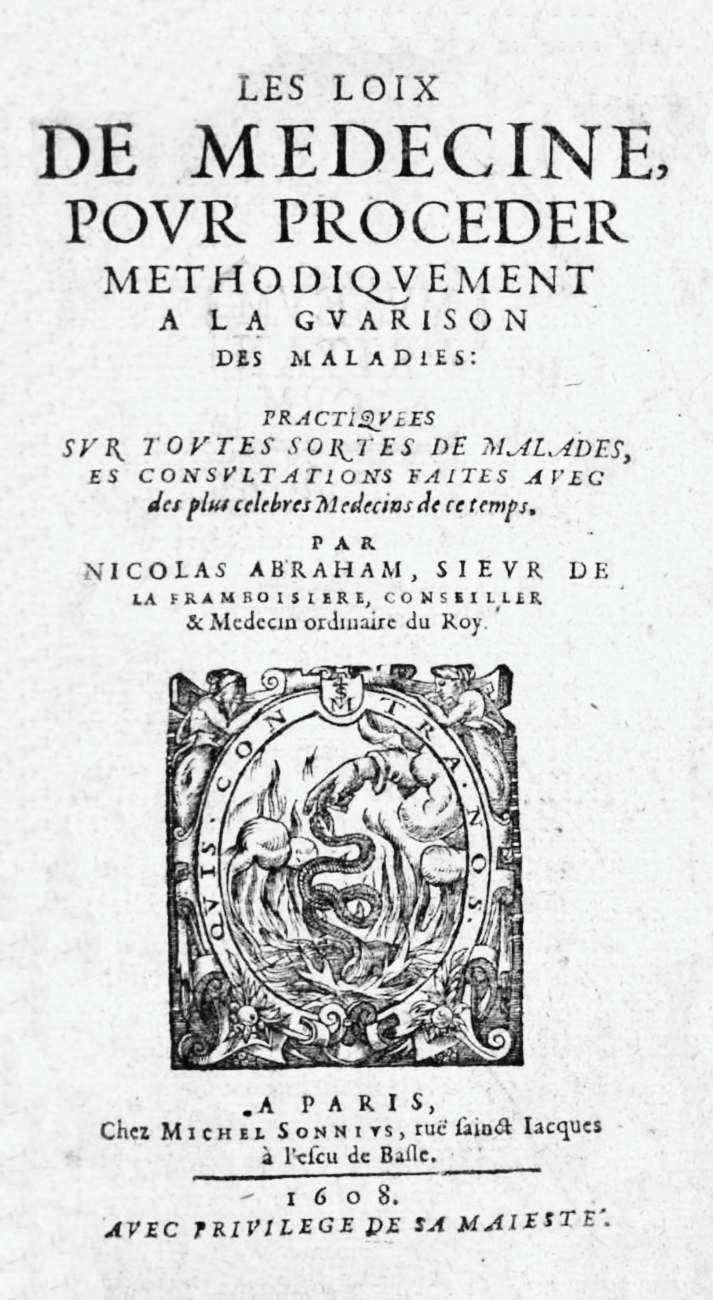
One of the earliest appearance is found in Nicolas Abraham de La Framboisière's 1608 book called "The Laws of Medicine"

Aræotics (Latin: aræōticus; Greek: Ἀπατωρνς) also known as araotics, refer to a category of remedies or treatments historically used in the field of medicine. These remedies were intended to thin the bodily humors, facilitating their elimination through the skin's pores. The term "araeotics" originates from Latin and was primarily used in medical literature from the 17th to the 19th century.

== Etymology ==
According to the Oxford English Dictionary, the term "Aræotics" finds its origins in the Latin language and is first recorded in the mid-17th century, with its last known appearance dating back to the early 19th century. The word is derived from Latin "aræōticus."

It is suggested that the term 'Aræotics' is derived from the Greek word 'Apatorns' or 'Ἀπατωρνς'

Physician Nicolas Abraham de La Framboisière, in his 1608 book called "The Laws of Medicine" description states the remedy was recognized in ancient Greek medicine under the term "Rarefactifs."

== Early medicine application ==
The concept of araotics is rooted in ancient medical theories, notably the humoral theory, which posited that imbalances in bodily humors could lead to illness.

As described by Abraham, there are two types of "Refolutifs" (Resolutives), the weaker kind called Aræotics and a stronger kind called Diaphoretics. Aræotics work by opening and softening the skin with moderate heat, allowing the release of retained substances, while diaphoretics, with greater heat, disperse substances more effectively. Sudorifics is also said to be among the similar methods as described.

Additionally, Ephraim Chambers in his 1750 book "Cycolopaedia" states that Aræotics aides in the removal of "morbific matter" from the body. These remedies aim to open the pores of the skin, facilitating the elimination of toxins through sweat or insensible perspiration.

== Classifications and Types ==
Aræotics encompass various types of remedies, including both simple and compound formulations.

=== Simple ===
Simple aræotics may include herbs and natural substances such as marshmallow, wall pellitory, adiantum, mercury, byblis, valerian, rosemary, sage, thyme, chamomile flowers, sweet clover, dill, barley and wheat flours, linseed, fenugreek, nielle, breadcrumbs, and hay. Additionally, fats from animals such as hen, goose, duck, and veal are also classified as aræotics.

=== Compound ===
Compound aræotics are mixtures of different herbs and substances, including chamomile, anise, lily, speedwell, kerry, damson, and others. These compounds are formulated to supposedly enhance the effects of aræotics in promoting perspiration and eliminating toxins from the body.

== Contemporary relevance ==
The term "Aræotics" is no longer commonly used in modern medical practice and is considered obsolete in contemporary usage. The concept of promoting perspiration as a means of detoxification remains relevant. Contemporary medical treatments may employ similar principles, albeit under different terminology and with advanced scientific understanding.
