= Golden Gate Bridge, Highway and Transportation District =

Special-purpose district in San Francisco

Agency overview
- Formed: December 4, 1928
- Type: Special-purpose district
- Headquarters: San Francisco, California, US
- Employees: 854
- Annual budget: $23.38 million annually
- Agency executive: Denis J. Mulligan, General Manager
- Website: goldengate.org

The Golden Gate Bridge, Highway and Transportation District is a special-purpose district that owns and operates three regional transportation assets in the San Francisco Bay Area: the Golden Gate Bridge, the Golden Gate Ferry system and the Golden Gate Transit system. All three assets connect Marin County with San Francisco.

== History and responsibilities ==
The District was incorporated on December 4, 1928, as the Golden Gate Bridge and Highway District to design, construct, and finance the Golden Gate Bridge. The responsibility of regional transit service within the Golden Gate Corridor was given to the District on November 10, 1969, at which time it was given its current name.

The District's territory includes the City and County of San Francisco; Marin, Sonoma, and Del Norte counties; and large portions of Napa and Mendocino counties. The only other county along the California North Coast, Humboldt County, declined to join the district after its residents opposed the bridge's construction, fearing that the increase in tourists and newcomers would disrupt the local redwood lumber industry and various cattle and sheep ranches.

The District provides regional bus and ferry transit service throughout the Golden Gate Corridor, which runs from San Francisco to Sonoma County. The District does not operate transit service in Napa, Mendocino, or Del Norte counties. Within Marin County, Golden Gate Transit is the contractor for a majority of bus service provided by Marin Transit, a relationship that dates to 1971. Golden Gate Transit has operated bus service across the Richmond–San Rafael Bridge to Contra Costa County on behalf of the Metropolitan Transportation Commission since 1993.

The District's primary revenue source is tolling on the southbound lanes of the Golden Gate Bridge. (The last of the bridge's construction bonds were retired in 1971, with principal and interest raised entirely from bridge tolls. A mix of tolls, transportation subsidies, and grants is used to support bus and ferry services.

In the 1950s and 60s, the District opposed a BART extension into Marin County using the lower deck of the Golden Gate Bridge in order to avoid losing income from bridge tolls, which contributed to Marin County withdrawing from BART.

== Governing structure ==
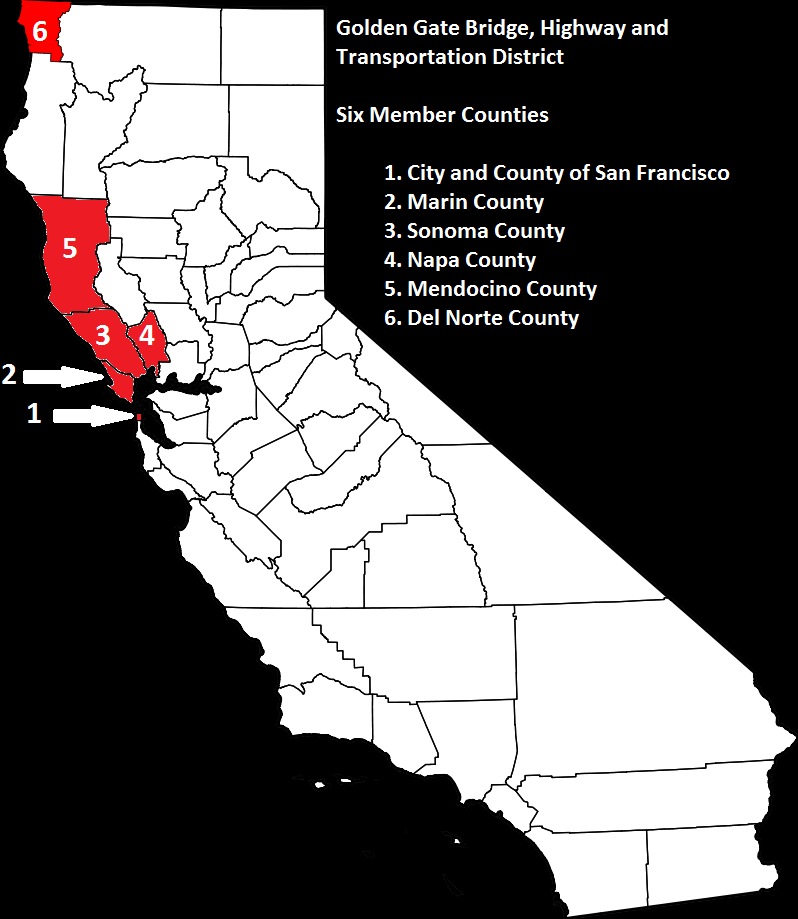
Map of the six-member counties of the Golden Gate Bridge, Highway and Transportation District in California, USA

The District has a 19-member board of directors:

- Nine directors represent San Francisco
  - One is appointed by the Mayor
  - Four are elected members of the Board of Supervisors
  - Four are non-elected people appointed by the Board of Supervisors
- Four directors represent Marin County
  - Two are elected members of the Board of Supervisors
  - One is an elected member of the Council of Mayors and Councilmembers and is appointed by the Board of Supervisors
  - One is a non-elected person appointed by the Board of Supervisors
- Three directors represent Sonoma County
  - One is an elected member of the Board of Supervisors
  - One is an elected member of the Council of Mayors and Councilmembers and is appointed by the Board of Supervisors
  - One is a non-elected person appointed by the Board of Supervisors
- One director each represent Napa, Mendocino, and Del Norte counties
  - Each is a non-elected person appointed by the respective Boards of Supervisors

The District is headquartered in San Francisco and has administrative offices in San Francisco and San Rafael.

Two members of the board also serve on the Sonoma–Marin Area Rail Transit board of directors, and operations are coordinated between the two agencies.
