= MV Spokane =

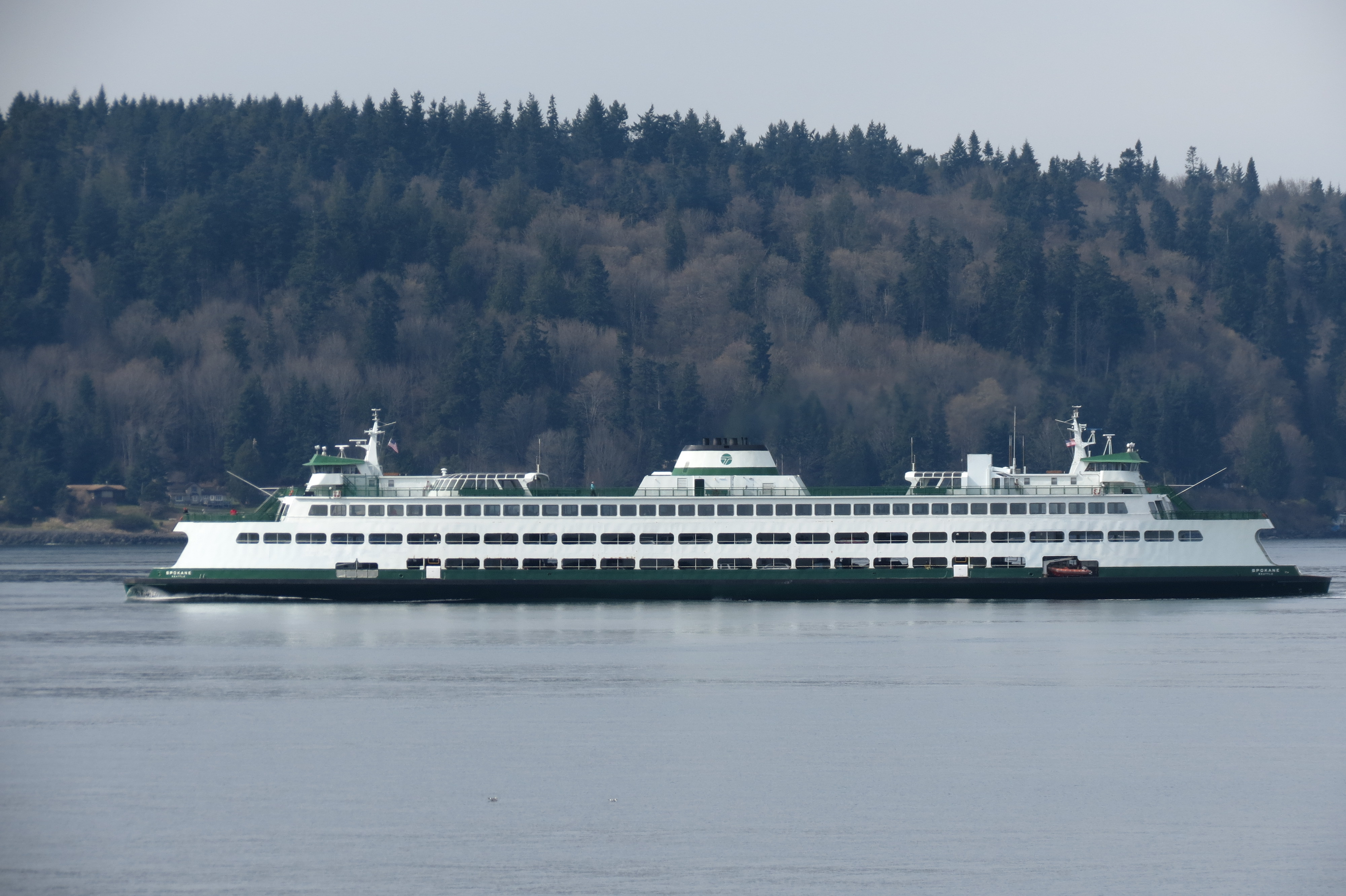
- MV Spokane sailing from Edmonds to Kingston.

History
- Name: Spokane
- Owner: WSDOT
- Operator: Washington State Ferries
- Port of registry: Seattle, Washington
- Route: Edmonds-Kingston
- Builder: Todd Shipyards, Seattle
- Completed: 1972
- Maiden voyage: February 13, 1973
- In service: February 24, 1973
- Identification: IMO number: 7214325; MMSI number: 366709780; Callsign: WYX2004
- Status: In service

General characteristics
- Class & type: Jumbo-class auto/passenger ferry
- Tonnage: 3,246 GT; 1,198 NT
- Displacement: 4,859 long tons (4,937 t)
- Length: 440 ft (134 m)
- Beam: 87 ft (27 m)
- Draft: 16 ft (5 m)
- Decks: 4
- Deck clearance: 15 ft 8 in (4.8 m)
- Installed power: Total 11,500 hp (8,600 kW) from 4 x diesel-electric engines
- Propulsion: Diesel-electric (DC)
- Speed: 18 knots (33 km/h; 21 mph)
- Capacity: 2,000 passengers; 206 vehicles (max 60 commercial)

MV Spokane is a Jumbo-class ferry operated by Washington State Ferries. She was built in 1972 by the Todd Shipyards in Seattle, Washington, for the Seattle–Bainbridge route. The ship remained assigned there until the construction of the Jumbo Mark-II class in the late 1990s displaced her to the Edmonds–Kingston route, where she has remained since.

Perhaps one of the most notable features of the Spokane is her colorful interior which she has sported since being rebuilt in the mid 1990s.

== Naming ==
Spokane was named for the Spokane tribe by the Washington State Highway Commission, continuing the tradition of naming ferry vessels for Native American tribes that was started by the Puget Sound Navigation Company. At least seven other vessels had carried the name "Spokane" prior to the launch of the ferry in 1972.

== History ==
Spokane was launched by Todd Shipyards on April 14, 1972, and christened by Carol Stearns of the Spokane tribe. On the same day, the keel for MV Walla Walla was laid at the shipyard. Both vessels cost $17.7 million to construct.

She made her ceremonial maiden voyage on February 13, 1973, departing from Colman Dock in Seattle carrying Governor Dan Evans, the mayors of Seattle and Spokane, and members of the Spokane tribe. At 440 feet (130 m) long and with a capacity of 206 cars, the Spokane was the largest ferry in the Washington State Ferries system when she entered service.

The ferry made her first regular commuter run on the morning of February 24, 1973. Riders onboard complimented the "superferry" on her luxurious look, cleanliness, and handling.

With the launch of the Jumbo Mark-II-class ferries MV Tacoma and MV Wenatchee in 1998, Spokane was moved to the Edmonds–Kingston route alongside MV Puyallup.

The ferry was featured in a scene in the film Cinderella Liberty.
