= MV Walla Walla =

Jumbo class automobile ferry

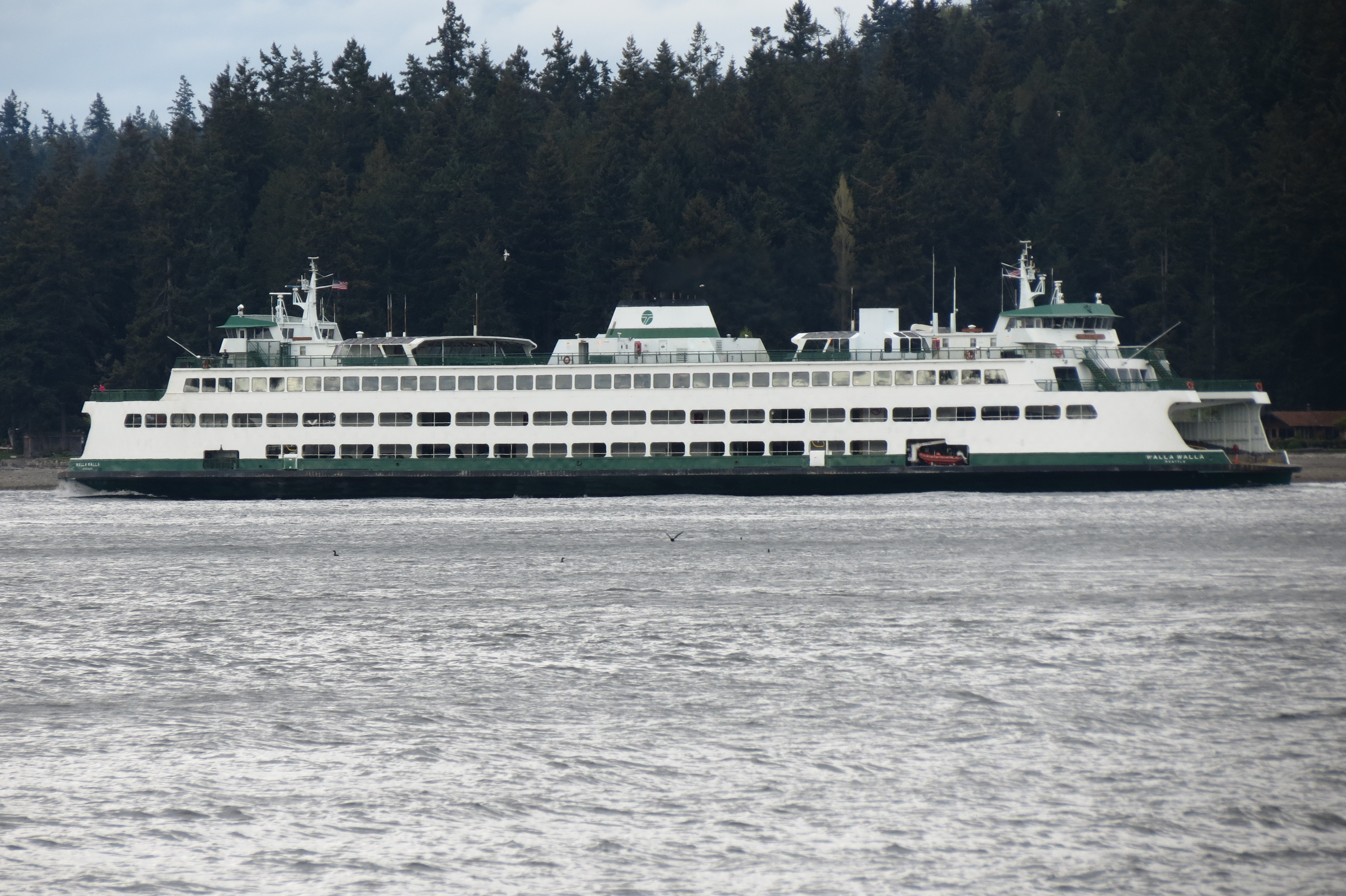
- The MV Walla Walla in Rich Passage

History
- Name: Walla Walla
- Owner: WSDOT
- Operator: Washington State Ferries
- Port of registry: Seattle, Washington, US
- Route: Bremerton–Seattle
- Builder: Todd Shipyard, Seattle
- Completed: 1972; Refurbished: 2005
- In service: 1972
- Identification: IMO number: 7233151; MMSI number: 366710810; Callsign: WYX2158; Official Number: 546382
- Status: In service

General characteristics
- Class & type: Jumbo-class auto/passenger ferry
- Tonnage: 3,246 GT; 1,198 NT
- Displacement: 4,860 long tons (4,940 t)
- Length: 440 ft (134 m)
- Beam: 87 ft (27 m)
- Draft: 18 ft (5 m)
- Decks: 4
- Deck clearance: 15 ft 6 in (4.7 m)
- Installed power: Total 11,500 hp (8,600 kW) from 4 x diesel-electric engines
- Propulsion: diesel electric (DC)
- Speed: 18 knots (33 km/h; 21 mph)
- Capacity: 2,000 passengers; 188 vehicles (max 60 commercial)

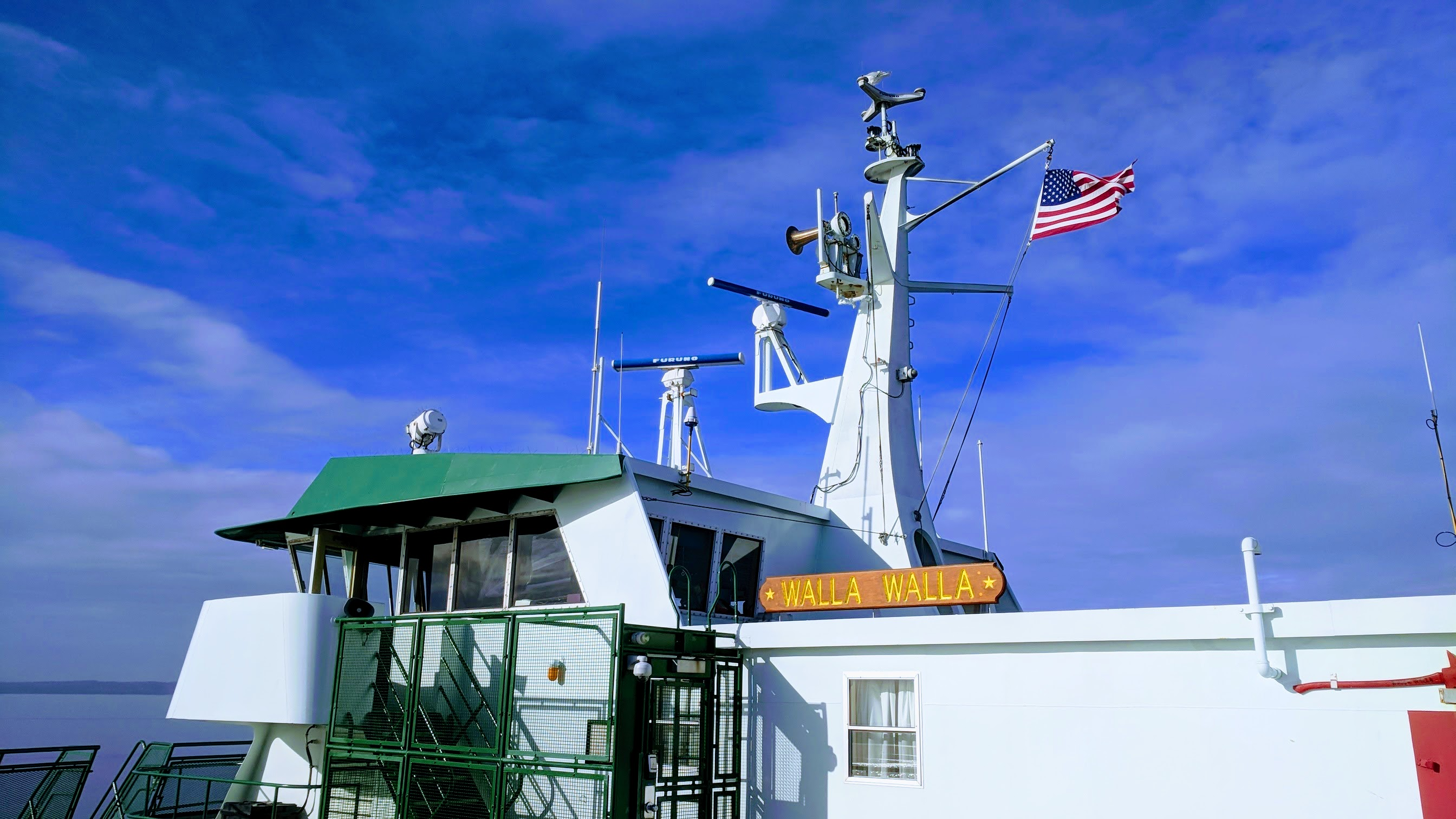
The Walla Walla underway from Edmonds to Kingston

MV Walla Walla (Motor Vessel Walla Walla) is a Jumbo-class ferry operated by Washington State Ferries.

== History ==
The Walla Walla was originally assigned to the San Juan Islands, however, in its first year of service it was reassigned to the Seattle-Bainbridge route for which ridership better aligned with the high capacity of the Jumbo-class vessels.

After being replaced on the Seattle–Winslow route by a Jumbo Mark-II-class ferry, the ship began serving as a fill-in vessel for whenever one of the larger ferries goes into scheduled maintenance periods; usually she can be found on either the Seattle–Bremerton or Edmonds–Kingston routes. Occasionally the Walla Walla will still end up filling in on the Seattle–Bainbridge Island run where it spent its early years. In late July 2014, the Jumbo Mark-II-class ferry, MV Wenatchee sailed to Vancouver, British Columbia for repairs. Since Washington State Ferries had no large backup vessels, the Walla Walla once again found herself on her old run, the Seattle–Winslow route. As a result, she was the other vessel on the route on the day the MV Tacoma suffered her massive electrical failure.

=== April 1981 grounding ===
On April 23, 1981, the ferry ran aground near Bainbridge Island at approximately 7:50 a.m. after heavy fog impacted the navigation of the vessel. No serious injuries were reported among the more than 600 commuters. Two tug boats attempted to pull the ferry free but were unsuccessful leading officials to wait until high tide approximately 12 hours later. Passengers walked off the vessel at approximately 10:15am onto a waiting barge and 2 tour boats. The vehicles on the boat were made available to passengers at about 7:30 p.m.

=== November 2012 incident ===
In early November 2012, during routine maintenance, one of the ship's four drive motors was damaged and failed after it overheated. The ferry was removed from service while a replacement was installed. WSDOT announced that if the damaged motor could be replaced with a spare already in its warehouse, the ferry could be back into service within several months. The spare motor was refurbished by General Electric in Los Angeles and then installed at Vigor Shipyards. The Walla Walla returned to service in April 2013.

=== April 2023 grounding ===
At approximately 4:30 p.m. on April 15, 2023, the ferry ran aground on a Bainbridge Island beach after a generator failure while transiting Rich Passage during a Bremerton–Seattle run. No injuries or hull damage were reported among the 596 passengers and 15 crew members. All passengers were evacuated onto Kitsap Fast Ferries and returned to Bremerton within a few hours. The Walla Walla was towed by tugboats back to Bremerton for inspections and to unload the 200 vehicles left onboard until the following morning.

A subsequent investigation by Washington State Ferries and the U.S. Coast Guard determined that contaminated fuel had clogged filters leading into the boat's generators and caused them to shut down. The fuel contamination was caused by excessive air that entered the "two-day tank" and formed a black sludge of bacteria and fungus that clogged the filters. The onboard backup generator also failed and the crew were unable to start a third generator, leaving the vessel without power. Walla Walla sustained a bent propeller and other minor damage. The ferry later reentered service, but again damaged a propeller and was withdrawn for dry-docking on September 18.
