= Washington State Ferries =

Public ferry service in Washington, US

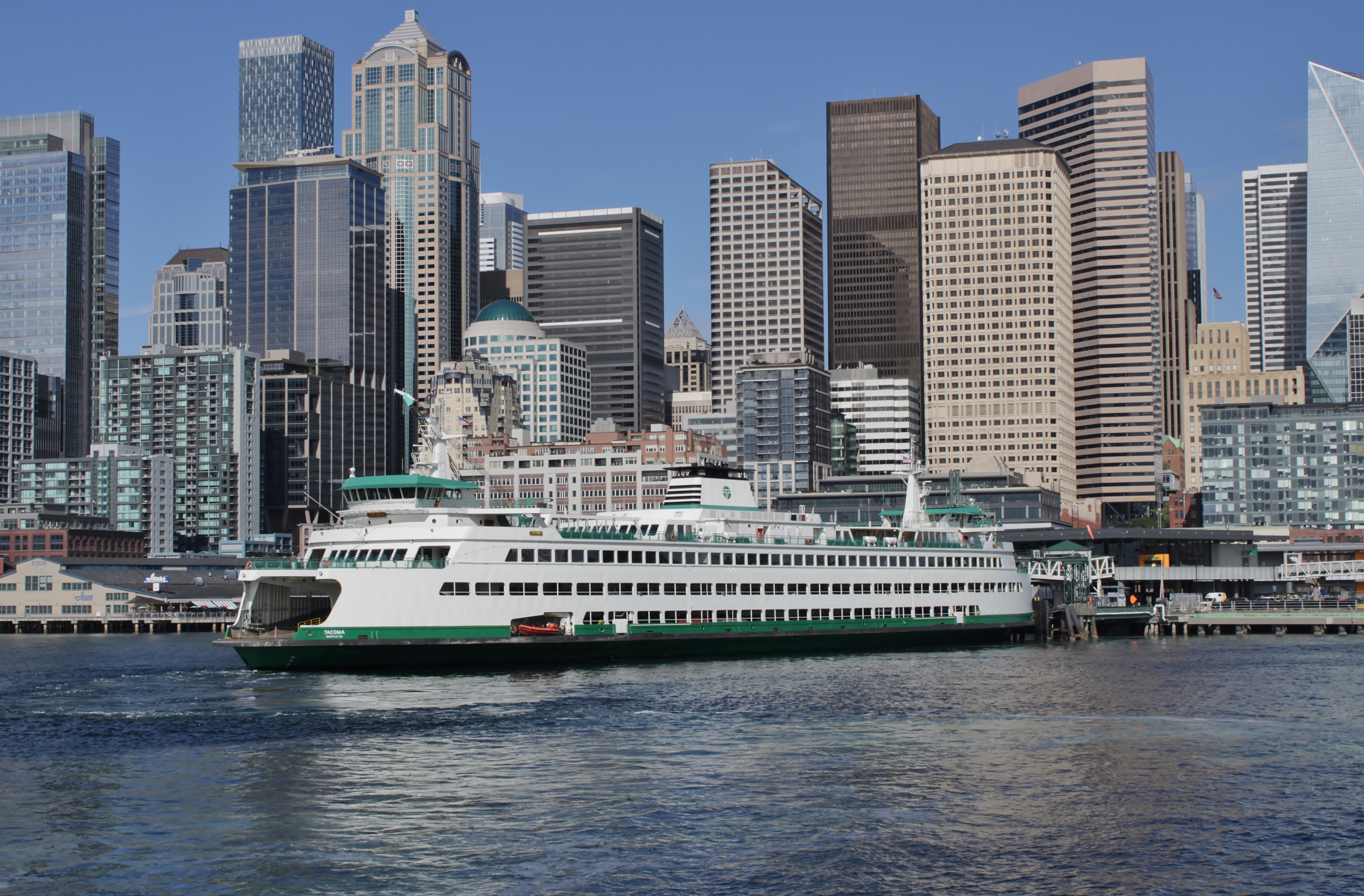
- MV Tacoma at Colman Dock in Downtown Seattle
- Locale: Washington
- Waterway: Puget Sound, Salish Sea
- Transit type: Ferry
- Owner: Washington State Department of Transportation
- Operator: Washington State Department of Transportation
- Began operation: June 1, 1951
- System length: 185.20 mi (298.05 km)
- No. of lines: 8
- No. of vessels: 21
- No. of terminals: 20
- Daily ridership: 42,500 (weekdays, Q1 2026)
- Yearly ridership: 20,108,545 (2025)
- Website: wsdot.wa.gov/travel/washington-state-ferries

Washington State Ferries (WSF) is a public ferry system in the U.S. state of Washington that carries passengers and vehicles. A division of the Washington State Department of Transportation (WSDOT), it operates 8 routes serving 20 terminals within Puget Sound and in the San Juan Islands. The routes are designated as part of the state highway system and also comprise a major public transit network in the Seattle metropolitan area. WSF is the largest ferry system in the United States and carried 20.1 million total riders in 2025, of which 10.7 million were passengers and 9.4 million were driving vehicles. The agency carried an average of 42,500 per weekday in the first quarter of 2026.

The ferry system began operation on June 1, 1951, after the state government acquired routes, vessels, and terminals from the Puget Sound Navigation Company, a private company that had a virtual monopoly on ferries in the region. The company had sold its assets after it was barred from raising fares in the 1940s and was unable to cover rising costs. Under state control, the ferry system was modernized and expanded through the use of custom-built vessels that could carry larger numbers of passengers and vehicles. WSF was originally a division of the Washington State Toll Bridge Authority and was transferred to WSDOT control in 1977.

WSF maintains a fleet of 21 vessels that are able to carry passengers and vehicles. The largest of the fleet is the Jumbo Mark II class, which can carry 1,791 passengers and 202 vehicles. The ferries have a 60-year lifespan and undergo at least one refurbishment during their time in service; they are maintained at a Bainbridge Island facility and inspected by the U.S. Coast Guard. The agency plans to convert existing vessels, which use diesel fuel, to hybrid-electric propulsion and construct new hybrid ferries by 2040. WSF has over 1,500 full-time employees and an annual budget of $354 million that is primarily funded by fares and the state's gas tax.

== History ==
=== Predecessors ===
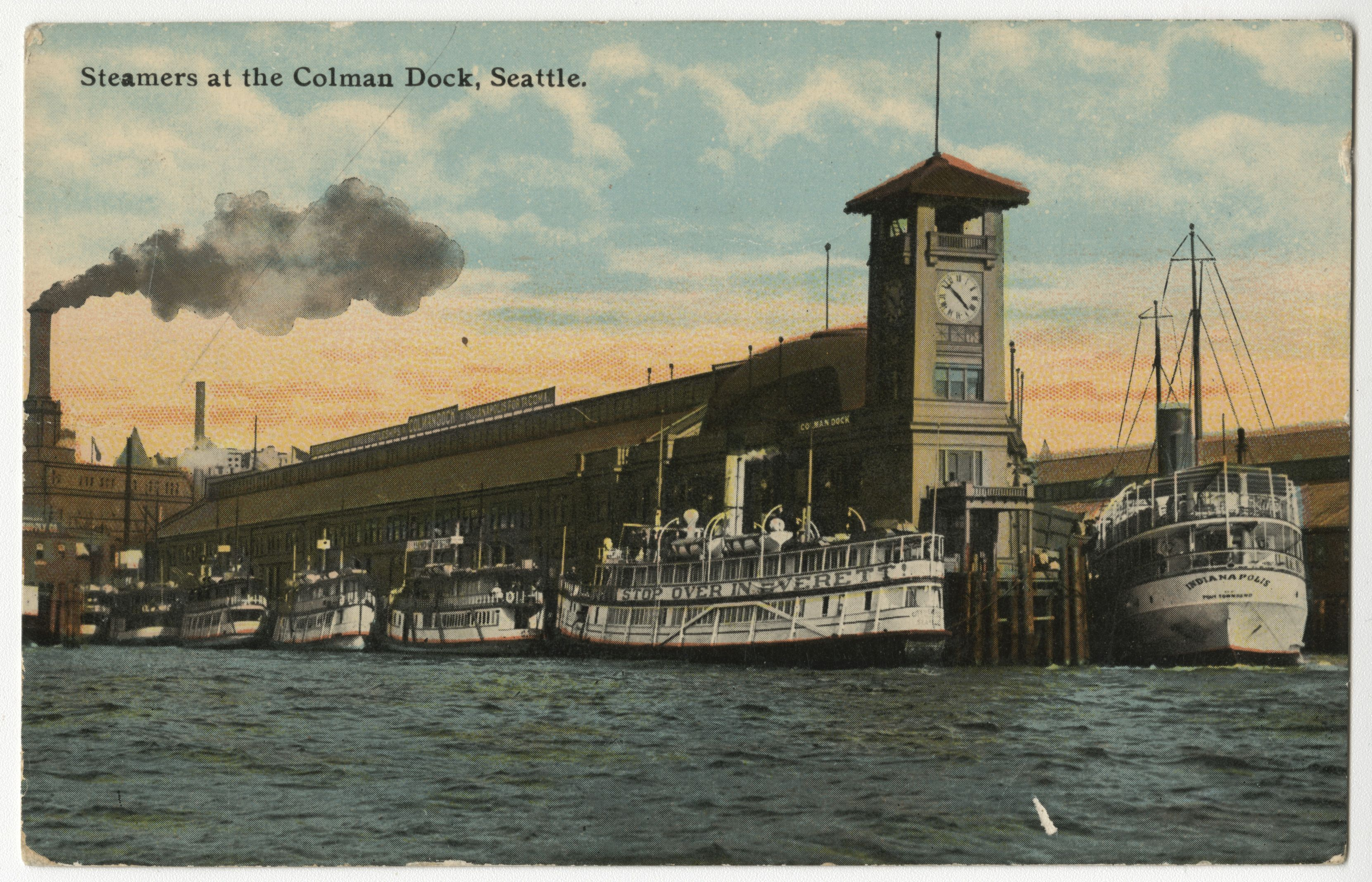
Postcard depicting the mosquito fleet at Colman Dock in Seattle, c. 1910

Early transportation in modern-day Western Washington relied primarily on the use of Puget Sound by the indigenous Coast Salish peoples and later settlers in the region. The first ferryboat in the region was the Fairy, which operated on a weekly schedule with service from Olympia to Steilacoom, Alki Point, and Seattle. The Fairy was a sidewheel steamer that carried passengers as well as freight and mail between her introduction in October 1853 and her sinking in October 1857. As new settlements developed along Puget Sound in the late 19th century, more steamships were brought to serve the region and later formed the "mosquito fleet", a collection of small ferries run by private companies to carry passengers and freight. At its peak on Puget Sound and Lake Washington, the mosquito fleet comprised an estimated 700 to 2,500 vessels, each with an average length of 100 feet (30 m) and capacity of 300 passengers.

The ferries of the mosquito fleet were also designed to carry horse-drawn carts and later automobiles. The City of Seattle, built in 1888, was the first to carry carts across Elliott Bay; it was followed by the sternwheeler Bailey Gatzert, which was retrofitted in 1920 to add a car elevator. Smaller operators on Puget Sound were gradually consolidated or eliminated due to the cost of converting their fleet to carry automobiles, which left two companies with the majority of routes: the Puget Sound Navigation Company (also known as the Black Ball Line for its flag) and the Kitsap County Transportation Company (KCTC). The Black Ball Line had been founded in 1900 and were among the first to adapt to automobile use, including at their flagship Colman Dock terminal in Downtown Seattle. The company had 17 routes and 25 vessels by 1929, when Alexander M. Peabody became its president and general manager. A 33-day strike that began in November 1935 halted all ferry service from five companies, including KCTC but excluding the Black Ball Line, amid a dispute over working conditions and pay. The Black Ball Line acquired KCTC for $140,000 in liabilities (equivalent to $2.51 million in 2024 dollars) during the strike and continued to buy out other operators to create a near-monopoly on Puget Sound.

=== Black Ball strikes and shutdowns ===
A second major strike lasted for 29 days in May and June 1937 required intervention from the state government, which held regulatory power as the franchiser of ferry routes. Governor Clarence D. Martin announced an agreement with Peabody and the striking union to raise fares in exchange for increased wages and a nine-hour work day. To accommodate a growing demand for modern ferries that could carry automobile traffic, the Black Ball Line acquired 14 vessels from operators in the San Francisco Bay Area between 1937 and 1942 following the completion of the San Francisco–Oakland Bay Bridge. By 1942, the Black Ball Line operated 452 daily sailings on 15 routes with a fleet of 23 vessels that were able to carry a total of 22,500 vehicles and 315,000 passengers. At the request of the U.S. Navy, Peabody voluntarily lowered fares on the Seattle–Bremerton route by 10 percent and increased service to assist in worker recruitment for the Puget Sound Naval Shipyard in Bremerton. The company ran hourly ferries from Seattle to Bremerton on a 24-hour schedule and saw an increase in traffic due to gasoline rationing. Peabody announced in December 1946 that pre-war fares would be immediately restored and that Black Ball would petition the state government for another fare increase of 30 percent to cover higher wages.

In February 1947, the state government granted temporary approval of the fare increase until a full investigation of the company's finances was conducted; ferry commuters criticized the decision and formed the Northwest Washington Community Council (NWCC), a civic organization that lobbied the state legislature for a government takeover of the ferry system. The state legislature authorized the creation of local ferry districts as a compromise that fell short of a full takeover. A union of Black Ball engineers went on a seven-day strike in March 1947 that completely shut down the ferry system; buses, chartered vessels, small airlines, and the U.S. Navy's amphibious landing ships were enlisted to provide temporary service. A labor agreement was signed after arbitration from governor Monrad Wallgren and service was restored, but commuter confidence in Black Ball was damaged. The state government's investigation of Black Ball's finances found that the 30 percent fare increase requested by the company was "unwarranted" and only granted a 10 percent increase. A partial refund of passenger fares charged during the temporary approval period was also ordered and later upheld by a superior court after Peabody's appeals were rejected. In response to the court decision, Peabody threatened to cease operations of the Black Ball Line but offered to lease vessels and facilities to the state government for fare compensation, which was rejected.

Flag of the Puget Sound Navigation Company (known as the Black Ball Line), adopted in 1927

On February 29, 1948, Peabody ordered a full shutdown of the Black Ball fleet after talks with the state government broke down; the company's operating franchise and certificate of public convenience and necessity were subsequently canceled by the state government. The U.S. Navy resumed its use of landing ships to transport shipyard workers to Bremerton, while pleasure boats and other private ferries were chartered to serve some routes. The shutdown ended nine days later with an agreement from King County to charter Black Ball to operate the ferry system. Vashon Island had activated their own ferry district during the shutdown and continued to operate service in defiance of Peabody, whose effigy was hung at the ferry terminal; an attempt by Peabody to land a ferry at the dock to regain his franchise on the Vashon Island route was repelled by vigilantes who wielded blunt weapons, including cue sticks and axe handles. The instability of ferry service and a potential state takeover became a key issue in the 1948 gubernatorial election between Wallgren, who sought to purchase the system, and former governor Arthur B. Langlie, who supported condemnation. An offer from the state of $6 million (equivalent to $62.4 million in 2024 dollars) to purchase Black Ball for its ferries and domestic facilities was accepted by the company's shareholders but expired due to the ongoing election. A report from the state government released in July 1948 recommended the construction of five toll bridges and state operation of the remaining ferry routes that would not be replaced.

=== State takeover ===
Langlie won the gubernatorial election and submitted two bills to the state legislature during the 1949 session: the first would enable the Washington State Toll Bridge Authority (TBA) to operate or contract a ferry system; and the second would recognize ferry workers' unions and create a permanent arbitration commission for future collective bargaining negotiation. Both bills were signed into law on March 12, 1949. Peabody was reluctant to lose control of the ferry system and prevented the state government from acquiring land for an alternate public system as well as the proposed Agate Pass Bridge; the state responded with denial of highway access for the facilities and bridge landings. Negotiations between the parties had reached a stalemate that was broken by a state supreme court decision in July 1950 that ruled that the state government's Public Service Commission had regulatory jurisdiction to set fare rates. Peabody also faced pressure from his bankers to sell the system. On December 30, 1950, Langlie announced that the state government had agreed to acquire most of Black Ball's ferry routes, 16 vessels, and 20 terminals and would take over operations in six months' time. The $4.944 million purchase (equivalent to $51 million in 2024 dollars) by the TBA was financed through a bond issue that also covered the cost of rehabilitating vessels and facilities. Black Ball retained five ferries and the right to operate its remaining route between Seattle, Port Angeles, and Victoria, British Columbia.

The Black Ball flag was lowered at sundown on May 31, 1951, and the final run for the company's domestic routes was completed by MV Enetai in Bremerton at 2:30 a.m. the following morning. Washington State Ferries took over operations on June 1, with the first run at 5:20 a.m. on MV Vashon between Lofall and South Point across the Hood Canal. The new system, headquartered in Peabody's former offices at Colman Dock, retained most of Black Ball's existing schedules and 600 of the company's employees. In the following months, the 16 vessels purchased from Black Ball had their stacks repainted from red and black to green to mark the state's ownership; the ferries also switched to a single, long blast of their foghorns instead of the previous three-blast sequence, which was restored in 1958. The fare schedule was initially left unchanged and Washington State Ferries continued to honor commuter tickets purchased from Black Ball; the fare increases rejected by the state government were rolled back for future use and the partial refunds that had been issued in 1947 were retired. The ten initial routes were reduced to eight by the end of the year despite demands from Kitsap County officials to continue service to Suquamish and Indianola.

In the first year of state operation, the ferries carried 4.75 million passengers, an increase of 6.8 percent from the final year of Black Ball ownership, and 1.93 million vehicles. Fares on the ferry routes were reduced in July 1952 as a result of increased patronage and operational changes made under the TBA. The first fare increase—up to 10 cents for passengers and 20 cents for vehicles—went into effect in January 1955 to cover higher wages. Several fare increases followed, including a 32 percent hike, to keep pace with pension contributions for ferry workers as well as maintenance needs. The first gas tax subsidy for the ferry system was appropriated by the state legislature in 1959 to pay for interest on the bonds issued earlier in the decade. The state government had envisioned a series of bridges across Puget Sound built by the TBA to connect the Kitsap Peninsula that would largely replace the need for ferries by the 1960s. The first proposal, which would traverse Vashon Island and incorporate a floating bridge to Fauntleroy in West Seattle, was left unfunded by the state legislature in the 1959 session. Most of the other bridges were ultimately never built due to local opposition and left the ferry system as the primary means of crossing Puget Sound for vehicles. The Hood Canal Bridge, opened in August 1961, replaced the Lofall–South Point ferry and is the last major crossing built across Puget Sound. Revenue from the bridge's tolls was used to cover annual debt service payments for the earlier bonds issued by the TBA for the ferry system.

=== Fleet expansion and financial issues ===
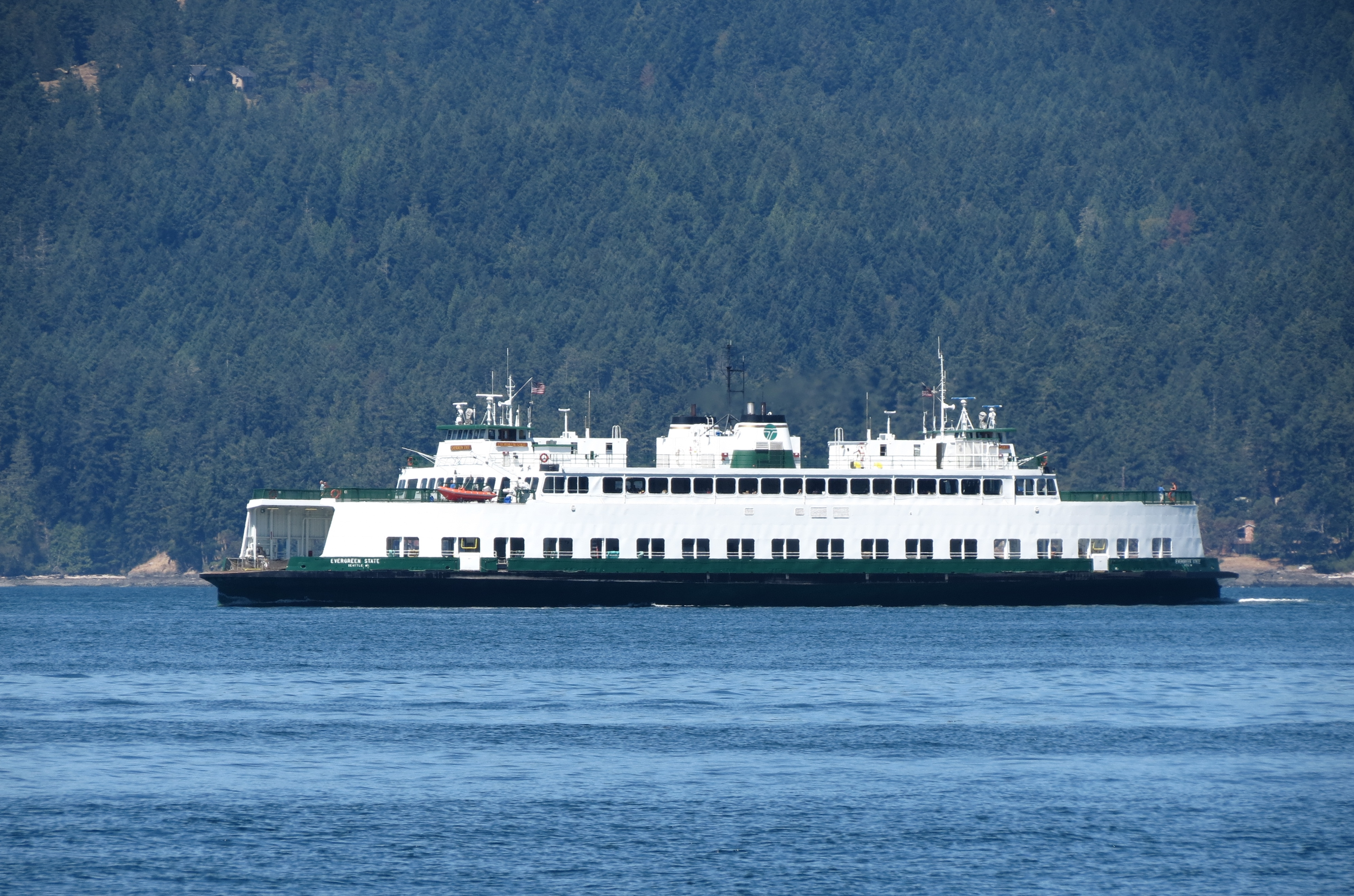
MV Evergreen State, the first new vessel built for Washington State Ferries

The initial Washington State Ferries fleet primarily comprised vessels that were acquired from Black Ball that ranged from small steamships and wooden ships to larger ferries that ran on diesel power; most were designed for smaller vehicles and would need to be expanded, renovated, or replace to handle the needs of a modern system. Three other vessels had been acquired from other sources: the Leschi from the King County Ferry District; and two ferries owned by the Department of Highways and used on the Tacoma Narrows crossing until 1950. Beginning in 1952, the TBA issued five rounds of new bonds to finance the renovation of terminals and acquisition of ten vessels that could carry 60 to 100 vehicles. Two ferries were purchased from the Claiborne–Annapolis Ferry Company in Maryland and underwent retrofitting in Seattle until they were rechristened Olympic and Rhododendron in 1953. The three Evergreen State-class ferries were the first new vessels built for Washington State Ferries and the system's largest, each able to carry 1,000 passengers and 100 vehicles. They were built from 1954 to 1959 using three surplus electric drive motors from decommissioned U.S. Navy destroyer escorts. The first vessel, MV Evergreen State, abandoned the indigenous names that had been used by Black Ball since the 1930s; the proposed names for the second and third vessels were scrapped in favor of a return to indigenous names in 1958 after public outcry.

From 1951 to 1955, most of the terminals and slips used and owned by the ferry system were renovated and rebuilt with funding from bond issues. New terminals in Edmonds, Kingston, and Mukilteo were built by local port districts with improved vehicle loading capabilities and leased back to the state government. Washington State Ferries opened a dedicated maintenance facility at Eagle Harbor on Bainbridge Island in 1964 after it purchased an existing ship repair yard. The system's flagship terminal, Colman Dock in Seattle, underwent an extensive renovation that was completed in May 1966 at a cost of $3 million (equivalent to $22.1 million in 2024 dollars). The passenger waiting area was replaced by a two-story building connected to two slips that were wide enough to load two vehicles at a time. Washington State Ferries commissioned the construction of its next large vessels, the 382-foot (116 m) Super class, to replace a set of retired Black Ball ferries that had become too costly to maintain. The four Super class ferries, designed to travel at 20 knots (23 mph; 37 km/h), carried over 2,000 passengers and 160 vehicles when they debuted in 1966 and 1967. The first on-board galley on Washington State Ferries opened in 1967. The ferry system carried over 5 million passengers and nearly 4.8 million vehicles across all its routes in 1968. The last remaining steam-powered ferry on the West Coast, SS San Mateo, was retired from the state ferry system in 1969 and later designated as a historic landmark.

The aging roster of former Black Ball vessels, along with a slow replacement schedule, contributed to increased operating costs for the ferry system during the 1960s. Some of the capital costs were covered with subsidies from the state government and grants from the federal government, but were still insufficient to continue replacement of vessels that were too small to handle increased automobile traffic. The TBA raised fares for three consecutive years at the end of the decade to balance the system's budget and later reduced overnight sailings to save costs. The Department of Highways commissioned a study of further cost savings measures, including route consolidations and bridge construction to replace short ferries. The replacement of automobile ferries on the Seattle–Bremerton route with passenger-only vessels was suggested, along with a new bridge to connect Bainbridge Island to the Kitsap Peninsula. The final study did not find large cost savings in route consolidations or replacement with passenger-only sailings; the state legislature did not take up the proposal and instead allocated a portion of gas tax revenue for operations and maintenance of the ferries, as well as debt and interest payments for the bonds, in 1972.

Washington State Ferries financed the construction of its two largest vessels—the 440-foot (130 m) Jumbo class—with gas tax revenue and placed an order with Todd Shipyards in Seattle. Both vessels entered service in 1973 and were able to carry up to 2,000 passengers and 206 vehicles. The ferry system eliminated several of its mid-day sailings and tied up one of the new Jumbo class vessels as part of fuel rationing measures at the onset of petroleum shortages and price hikes in late 1973. The federal government imposed controls on fuel use in November 1973 and released 80,000 US gallons (300,000 L; 67,000 imp gal) for use that month by Washington State Ferries after a request was made. The Jumbo ferries also used only two of their four engines during off-peak sailings and slowed their speed to 15 knots (17 mph; 28 km/h) instead of the normal 20 knots (23 mph; 37 km/h). The ferry system's fuel contract with Mobil Oil had increased from 15 cents in 1973 to 34 cents in 1977—totaling $4.5 million annually (equivalent to $18.1 million in 2024 dollars). By 1979, the fuel rate had increased to 55 cents per gallon and shortages resulted in the use of market prices for additional fuel at a cost of 62 cents per gallon.

The ferry system added a new route, between Port Townsend and Keystone on Whidbey Island, in June 1974. It replaced a seasonal service run by a private company that had relinquished its franchise and sold its facilities to the state government. The new Port Townsend terminal would later be served by a temporary route from Edmonds during the reconstruction of the Hood Canal Bridge after a portion collapsed in 1979. The ferry system increased passenger and vehicle fares several times in the late 1970s and early 1980s to compensate for increased wage and fuel costs. A summer vehicle surcharge of 20 percent was introduced for the first time in 1979. The increase in workers' wages came in response to several strikes by unions from 1976 to 1981, including a walkout by members of the International Organization of Masters, Mates & Pilots in September 1976.

=== Passenger routes and larger vessels ===
The TBA and several other state agencies were consolidated into the new Washington State Department of Transportation (WSDOT), established on September 21, 1977. Some of the oversight powers for Washington State Ferries, including fare decisions, were vested in the new Washington State Transportation Commission, which is appointed by the governor. The six conventional-sized vessels of the Issaquah class were ordered by WSDOT in 1978 to serve shorter routes that would not be suitable for larger classes. They were the first vessels to use computerized controls, but suffered from glitches and power failures that led to several dock rammings when they entered service in the early 1980s. A lawsuit between the state government and the builder of the Issaquah class was settled out of court in 1985; the computerized control systems on the vessels were later replaced. Several of the ferry system's oldest vessels, including the Steel Electrics and Rhododendron, were refurbished and remained in service due to the issues with the Issaquah class.

In 1985, Washington State Ferries announced plans to launch its first permanent passenger-only routes, which would connect Colman Dock in Downtown Seattle to Bremerton and Vashon Island. The program would replace the need to order two more automobile ferries and was funded by a portion of the state legislature's 1977 bonds that financed the Issaquah class. The agency previously trialed the use of a Boeing Jetfoil, a passenger-only hydrofoil, for seven weeks in 1978 but ultimately decided to acquire conventional catamarans instead. The first passenger-only service, between Bremerton and Seattle, began in October 1986 using the MV Express, a catamaran with 245 seats that was acquired from a tour company. The scheduled travel time for the service was 30 minutes, compared to nearly 60 minutes for the normal automobile ferries on the route. The Express (later renamed Tyee) was struck by engine and mechanical issues in her first years of state operation; in 1988, the state government ordered the construction of two new catamarans to expand service and relegate the older vessel to backup status. The Tyee was used by several heads of state, including U.S. president Bill Clinton, during the 1993 APEC summit on Blake Island.

The operation of the Bremerton and Vashon Island passenger-only routes was to be funded by a gas tax increase in 1989, but a legislative dispute led to the suspension of service and a delayed debut for the two new vessels. The three ferries were loaned to the San Francisco Bay Ferry system in October 1989 after the Loma Prieta earthquake caused a section of the San Francisco–Oakland Bay Bridge to collapse. They returned to the Seattle area in January 1990. The Bremerton passenger-only ferry resumed on April 23, 1990, with service from the new MV Skagit; the Seattle–Vashon Island route debuted on the same day using MV Kalama. The two vessels, each able to carry 250 passengers per trip, were at standing-room only capacity on many runs and had a total ridership of 11,000 passengers in their first week. Property owners on Rich Passage, which lies on the western half of the Bremerton route, accused the ferry system of damaging their beaches with the increased wake from the catamarans at full speed. Both of the new ferries were moved to the Vashon Island route and replaced by the slower Tyee until the new MV Chinook, designed for low-wake use at a maximum speed of 40 knots (46 mph; 74 km/h), entered service in 1998. A county judge issued an injunction in 1999 to reduce the speed of the Chinook to 12 knots (14 mph; 22 km/h), which lengthened the Bremerton run to 50 minutes, in response to a lawsuit that sought financial compensation from wake damage on Rich Passage.

The ferry system ordered the construction of their largest class, the Jumbo Mark II, in 1992 at a cost of $248.8 million (equivalent to $498 million in 2024 dollars) for three vessels. They are 460 feet (140 m) long with a capacity of 2,500 passengers and 218 vehicles. The first of the class, MV Tacoma, entered service in 1997 and was followed by MV Puyallup and MV Wenatchee in 1999. Washington voters approved Initiative 695 in November 1999, which reduced most of the motor vehicle excise tax used to fund 22 percent of ferry operations and 77 percent of capital projects. The initiative was later invalidated by the state supreme court, but the tax reduction was instituted by the state legislature in the 2000 session. Renovations to several terminals and further expansion of the passenger-only ferries to Kingston and Southworth were scrapped as a result of the funding cuts. Mid-day and late-night service on several routes was reduced in June 2000 to address a $5.8 million shortfall (equivalent to $10 million in 2024 dollars) in the appropriated budget. In June 2001, fares were increased by an average of 20 percent—and as high as 76 percent for passenger-only routes—to cover a deficit in the operating budget; a series of increases was then intended to bring farebox recovery from 60 percent to 80 percent. The Bremerton passenger-only route ceased service on September 19, 2003; the Seattle–Vashon route received emergency funding to operate for at least two more years. The King County Ferry District, a new special district, took over the Vashon route in September 2009 using separate vessels after financing the final year of state service.

=== Fare increases and vessel replacements ===
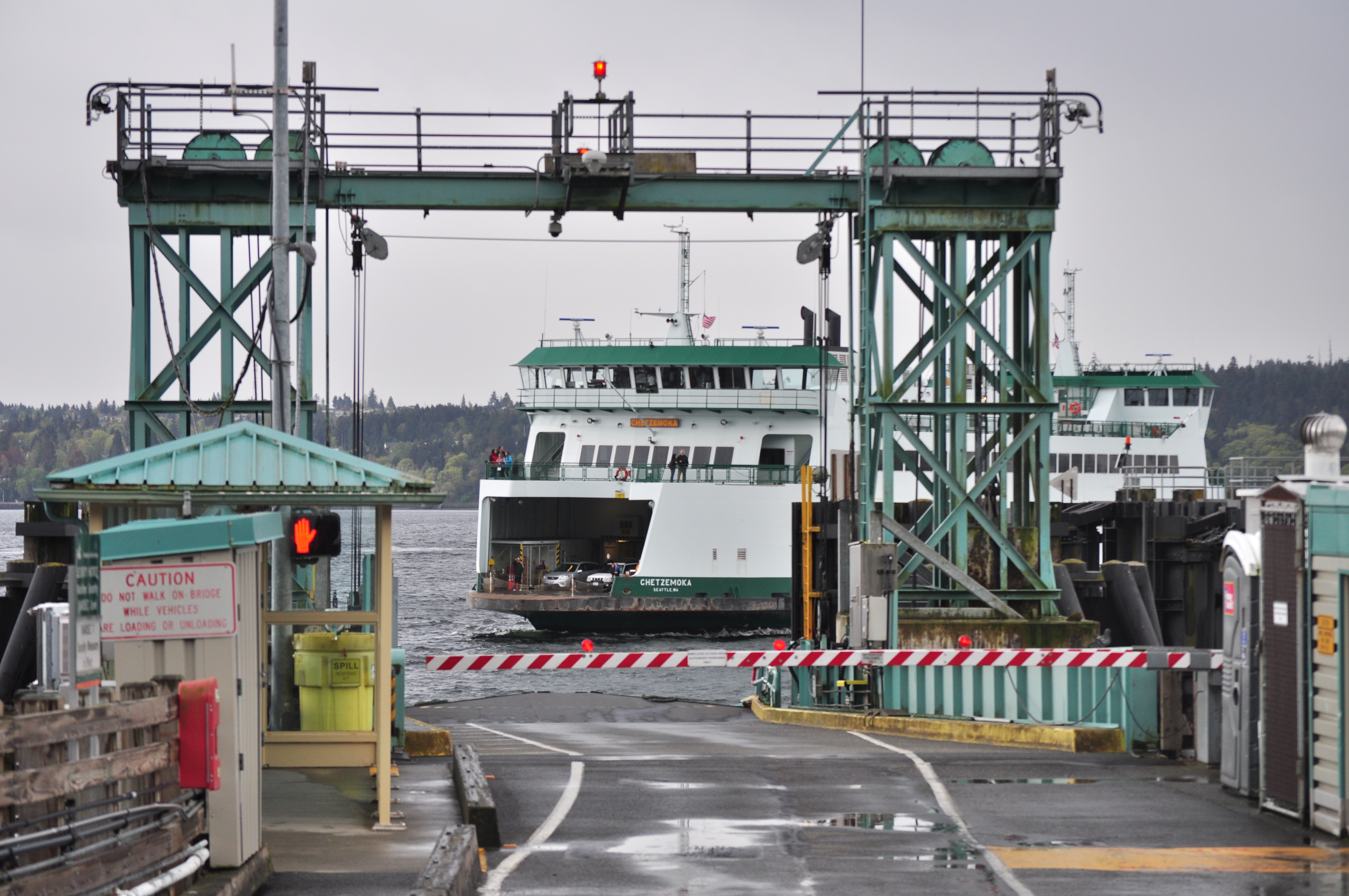
MV Chetzemoka, the first Kwa-di Tabil class ferry, at the Tahlequah ferry terminal on Vashon Island

The ferry system began a program of annual fare increases to fund more of its operating budget, which had been improved with a gas tax adjustment passed by the state legislature in 2003. Several routes had service reduced during the winter months, including a seasonal suspension of international trips to Sidney, British Columbia. The agency also sought to increase their non-fare revenue through an expansion of restaurants at Colman Dock, construction of a paid parking lot at the Anacortes terminal, and renegotiated contracts for the on-board galley and vending machines. Sodexho terminated their contract with the ferry system in January 2004 and left the system without on-board galley and food service. A consortium of local suppliers won bids for the contract and negotiated with unions to restore food service beginning with the Fauntleroy–Vashon–Southworth route in October 2004; a full rollout of the new galleys was completed the following year. The ferries were switched to low-sulfur diesel fuel beginning in July 2004 to comply with updated federal pollution mandates; a trial of B20 biodiesel was halted after crews reported issues with filtration in fuel tanks exposed to cold conditions.

Plans to construct five conventional ferries, each 342 feet (104 m) long and able to carry up to 1,200 passengers and 130 vehicles, were announced in early 2005. They were intended to replace the Rhodenderon and the four Steel Electric ferries that had been in service on the West Coast since 1927 and were primarily assigned to the San Juan Islands and Port Townsend–Keystone routes. The agency then announced that it would assign the new ferries, enlarged to 144 vehicles, to other routes and keep at least two Steel Electric vessels in service beyond 2009. All four Steel Electric ferries were pulled from service in November 2007 after inspections found evidence of pitted steel in the hull of MV Quinault. The Port Townsend–Keystone route was temporarily suspended due to the lack of vessels able to navigate the Keystone harbor; it was later replaced by a passenger-only ferry between the two terminals and later an extended trip to Colman Dock in Seattle. An emergency order for three smaller ferries, each able to carry 54 vehicles and navigate Keystone's harbor, was announced in December by governor Christine Gregoire; it proposed using some of the funding allocated for the five 144-vehicle ferries order that had been awarded to Todd Shipyard. The state leased the Steilacoom II, a 50-vehicle ferry operated by Pierce County, to restore automobile crossings on the Port Townsend–Keystone route in February 2008.

A design based on MV Island Home, a 76-vehicle ferry operated by the Steamship Authority in Massachusetts, was chosen in 2008 for the three ferries to expedite the bidding process. The first of the 64-vehicle Kwa-di Tabil class, MV Chetzemoka, entered service in November 2010 and replaced the Steilacoom II. The Chetzemoka was designed with a list when empty to offset full loads, which typically include freight. The two other vessels in the class entered service in 2011 and 2012 with a total program cost of $213.2 million. The original order for the 144-vehicle ferries, later named the Olympic class, was approved in November 2011 using a design based on the Issaquah class due to its versatility. The first ferry, MV Tokitae, entered service in 2014 and allowed for the retirement of the Evergreen State class to begin. Funding for the third vessel in the class was passed by the state legislature in 2014 and followed by $122 million for a fourth vessel in a 2015 transportation package. The fourth vessel, MV Chimacum, entered service in May 2017 as an emergency replacement on the Seattle–Bremerton route after MV Kitsap needed repairs.

=== Fleet and personnel shortages ===
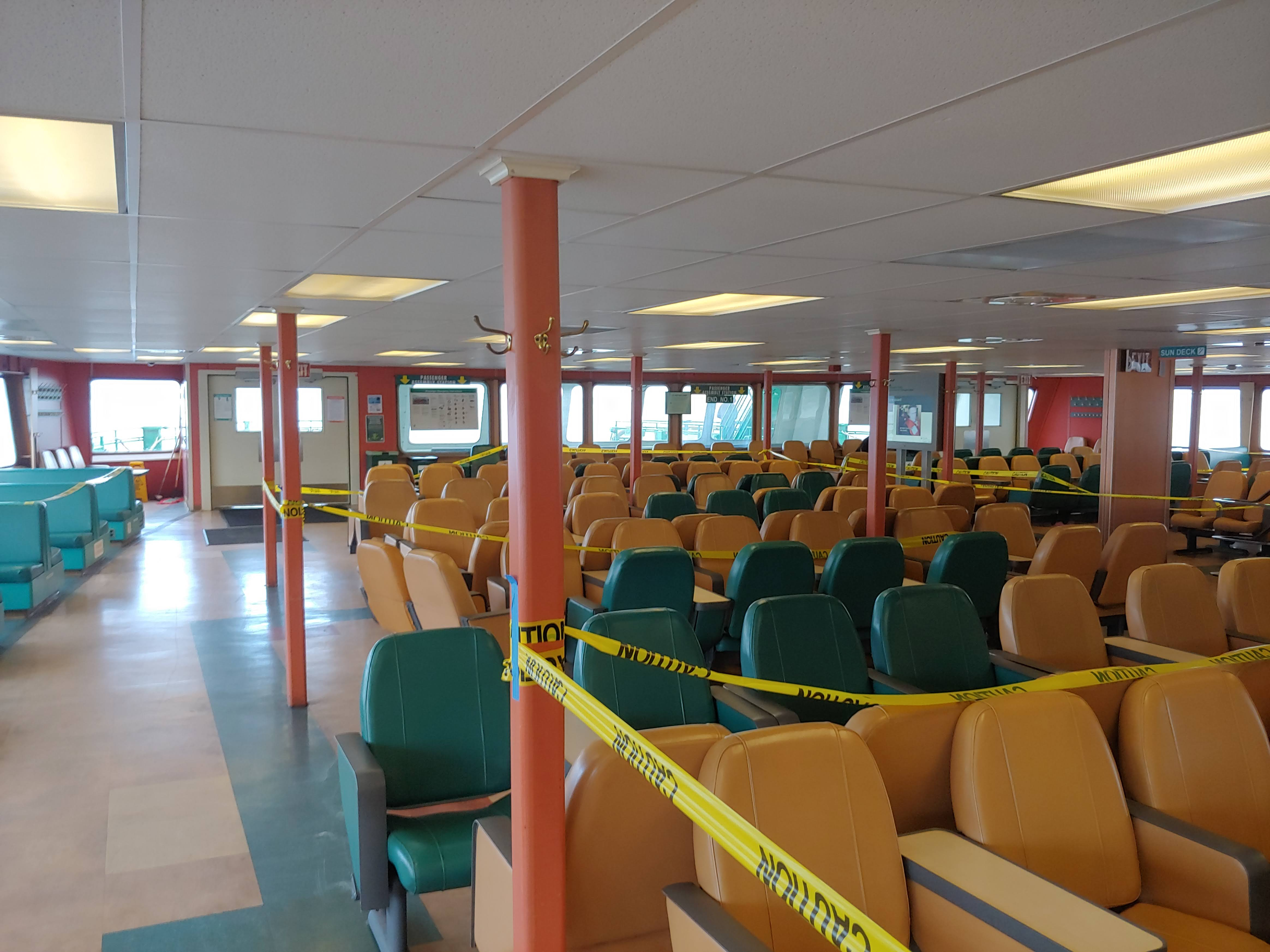
Closed seating areas on MV Spokane during the early stages of the COVID-19 pandemic

The ferry system's ridership peaked at 26.8 million total passengers in 1999 and declined by 16 percent by 2010 as the number of commuters and frequent riders decreased. Annual fare increases allowed the agency to reach $147 million in revenue to fund operations, but left insufficient funding for new vessels and other capital projects. Washington State Ferries adopted a new long-range plan in 2019 that proposed the replacement of 13 vessels and construction of the fleet's first hybrid electric ferries by 2040. The conversion of the Jumbo Mark II class ferries to hybrid propulsion was announced by governor Jay Inslee in 2018 and scheduled to be completed by 2023 using funding from a settlement in the Volkswagen emissions lawsuit. A multi-year project to replace most of Colman Dock began in 2017; the timber pilings that held up the dock had deteriorated and the terminal building had been deemed seismically vulnerable. The $350 million project was funded by the state government and grants from the federal government.

In 2017, Washington State Ferries funded the installation of bridge and engine room simulators at the Seattle Maritime Academy to train current employees as well as new crewmembers. The majority of the system's chief engineers and captains would become eligible for retirement within 10 years, leading to a potential shortage of trained officers. From 2017 to 2022, 66 captains and 24 mates had left the ferry system, largely because of retirements. The staffing shortage led to on-time performance dropping from 96 percent in 2012 to 85 percent in 2022; in the San Juan Islands, 45 percent of trips in early 2022 were delayed.

During the COVID-19 pandemic, WSF reduced service on most routes and suspended trips to Sidney on the Anacortes–San Juan Islands route. By early 2023, full levels of service were restored on four routes but remained limited across much of the system; the Sidney route is not expected to re-enter service until 2030. Staffing issues, particularly among ship captains and mates, continued to prevent the full restoration of service on the Seattle–Bremerton and Fauntleroy–Vashon–Southworth routes. As mitigation for the delay in restoring the Seattle–Bremerton run's second vessel, WSF funded additional trips on the parallel Kitsap Fast Ferries that serves both terminals. The second vessel on the Seattle–Bremerton route was restored in June 2025, followed a month later by weekend trips on the Port Townsend–Coupeville route to bring the system to its pre-pandemic domestic schedule.

== Routes ==
A map showing the routes operated by Washington State Ferries (in red) in comparison with Washington State highways (in yellow) and freeways, including Washington State and Interstate highways (in blue)

As of 2025, the Washington State Ferries system has 8 routes with an average of 392 daily scheduled sailings that serve 20 terminals located primarily on Puget Sound and in the San Juan Islands. The network spans 185.20 miles (298.05 km) and serves an estimated population of 3.9 million residents across an area of 1,945 square miles (5,040 km^{2}). These routes are part of the state highway system and carry freight traffic and emergency services in addition to passengers and automobiles. All of the system's route run year-round, but some have additional service during the peak summer months and on weekends. Most routes are assigned between two and three vessels for most of the year, with additional sailings for late-night service and weekends; the Anacortes–San Juan Islands ferry requires a minimum of four vessels year-round and assigns at least one solely for inter-island service.

The busiest route is the Seattle–Bainbridge Island ferry, which carried 5.2 million total riders in 2025; the Mukilteo–Clinton ferry carried 2.1 million total vehicles in 2025, the most of any route. The Mukilteo–Clinton ferry also had the most sailings, at over 25,700 in 2025, followed by the Anacortes–San Juan Islands route, which serves five terminals. Another multi-terminal route, the Fauntleroy–Vashon–Southworth ferry, is known as the "triangle" route due to its three routing patterns that allow some sailings to bypass Vashon Island. The longest route spans 40 nautical miles (46 mi; 74 km) from Anacortes to Sidney, British Columbia, and takes 2.5 hours to traverse. The international route ran seasonally between April and December but was suspended in 2020 and is not scheduled to resume service until 2030 at the earliest due to the lack of a SOLAS-certified vessel. The shortest route is the Point Defiance–Tahlequah ferry between Tacoma and Vashon Island, which is 1.5 nautical miles (1.7 mi; 2.8 km) long and has a crossing time of 15 minutes.

A 1949 state law prohibits private companies from operating their own ferry service within 10 miles (16 km) of a Washington State Ferries route without an exemption to prevent competition. Public transportation benefit areas on Puget Sound, which typically operate bus service, have been exempt from the restriction since 2003. The Kitsap Fast Ferries system launched in 2017 and has three routes that run passenger-only catamarans to Downtown Seattle, including a route parallel to the Seattle–Bremerton ferry; the King County Water Taxi operates two routes to West Seattle and Vashon Island.

Washington State Ferries routes
Route		Highway	Terminals	Length	Travel time	Began operation	Ridership (2025)		
Route		Highway	Terminals	Length	Travel time	Began operation	Vehicles	Passengers	Total
10	Seattle–Bremerton	SR 304	Bremerton Colman Dock (Seattle)	13.5 nmi (15.5 mi; 25.0 km)	60 minutes	June 1, 1951	457,025	849,238	1,306,263
20	Seattle–Bainbridge Island	SR 305	Bainbridge Island Colman Dock (Seattle)	7.5 nmi (8.6 mi; 13.9 km)	35 minutes	June 1, 1951	1,525,098	3,591,448	5,217,546
30	Fauntleroy–Vashon–Southworth	SR 160	Southworth Vashon Island Fauntleroy (West Seattle)	4.1 nmi (4.7 mi; 7.6 km) (Note: Measures the non-stop distance and time from Southworth to Fauntleroy)	30 minutes	June 1, 1951	1,423,172	944,206	2,367,378
40	Point Defiance–Tahlequah	SR 163	Point Defiance (Tacoma) Tahlequah (Vashon Island)	1.5 nmi (1.7 mi; 2.8 km)	15 minutes	June 1, 1951	538,406	422,176	960,584
50	Edmonds–Kingston	SR 104	Kingston Edmonds	4.5 nmi (5.2 mi; 8.3 km)	30 minutes	June 1, 1951	1,992,765	1,870,671	3,863,436
60	Mukilteo–Clinton	SR 525	Mukilteo Clinton (Whidbey Island)	2.3 nmi (2.6 mi; 4.3 km)	20 minutes	June 1, 1951	2,108,135	1,603,369	3,711,504
70	Port Townsend–Coupeville	SR 20	Port Townsend Coupeville (Whidbey Island)	4.5 nmi (5.2 mi; 8.3 km)	30 minutes	June 6, 1974	334,462	392,746	727,208
80	Anacortes–San Juan Islands	SR 20 Spur	Friday Harbor Orcas Island Shaw Island Lopez Island Anacortes	11 to 17 nmi (13 to 20 mi; 20 to 31 km)	50 to 125 minutes (Note: Depending on which terminals are served on the sailing)	June 1, 1951	941,849	1,012,777	1,954,626
85	Anacortes–Sidney	SR 20 Spur	Sidney, British Columbia Friday Harbor Anacortes	40 nmi (46 mi; 74 km)	160 minutes	June 1, 1951	Suspended since 2020		

=== Former and temporary routes ===
Since it began operation under state management in June 1951, the ferry system has discontinued two of its automobile routes and retained the remaining parts of the network. A run from Seattle to Indianola and Suquamish in northern Kitsap County was eliminated in September 1951 after tolls were removed from the Agate Pass Bridge. The South Point–Lofall route was retired in August 1961 after the Hood Canal Bridge opened to traffic. It resumed on a temporary basis in 1979 after the bridge collapsed in a windstorm and ran until 1982. Washington State Ferries also operated a direct ferry from Port Townsend to Edmonds from 1979 to 1980 during the bridge replacement project. The route was revived for a maintenance closure of the Hood Canal Bridge in May 2009 to carry freight traffic to the Olympic Peninsula. A passenger-only route from Seattle to Vashon Island ran from 1990 to 2009 and was transferred to the King County Water Taxi.

Former Washington State Ferries routes
Route	Terminals	Began operation	Ended operation	Notes
Edmonds–Port Townsend	Port Townsend Edmonds	February 21, 1979	February 9, 1980	Temporary service after collapse of the Hood Canal Bridge
Seattle–Bremerton POF	Bremerton Colman Dock (Seattle)	October 15, 1986	September 19, 2003	Passenger-only ferry; suspended from July 1989 to April 1990
Seattle–Port Townsend	Port Townsend Colman Dock (Seattle)	December 13, 2007	February 8, 2008	Passenger-only ferry to replace the suspended Port Townsend–Keystone run
Seattle–Suquamish	Suquamish Indianola Colman Dock (Seattle)	June 1, 1951	September 28, 1951	Replaced by the Agate Pass Bridge after tolls were lifted
Seattle–Vashon Island POF	Vashon Heights Colman Dock (Seattle)	April 23, 1990	September 28, 2009	Passenger-only ferry; replaced by the King County Water Taxi
South Point–Lofall (1951–1961)	South Point Lofall	June 1, 1951	August 12, 1961	Replaced by the Hood Canal Bridge; temporarily reactivated on February 5, 1963, due to emergency bridge repairs
South Point–Lofall (1979–1982)	South Point Lofall	February 26, 1979	October 23, 1982	Temporary service after collapse of the Hood Canal Bridge; passenger-only vessel replaced by barges and a full-sized ferry in December 1979

== Terminals ==
Mukilteo ferry terminal

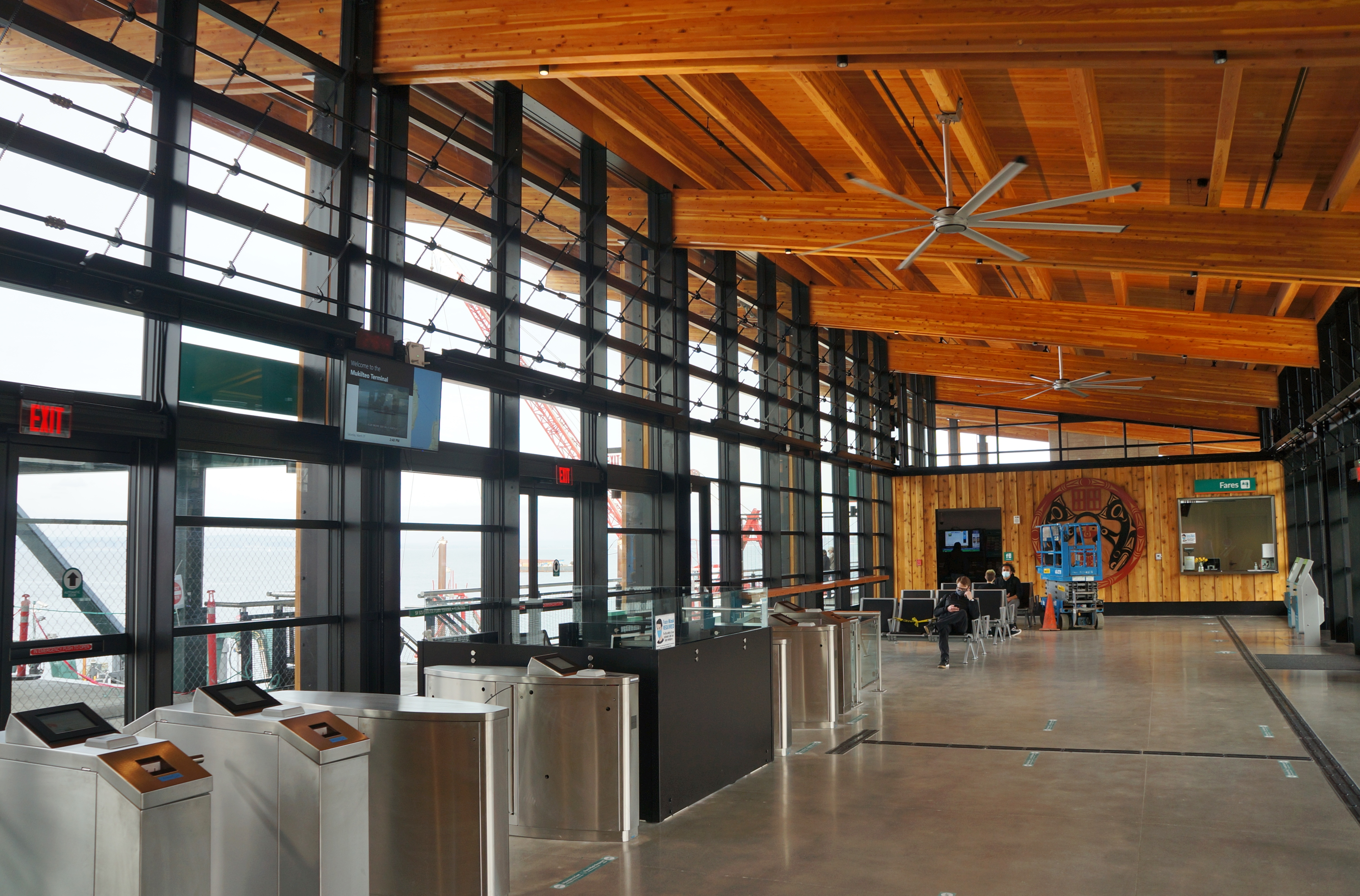
The interior of the passenger waiting area

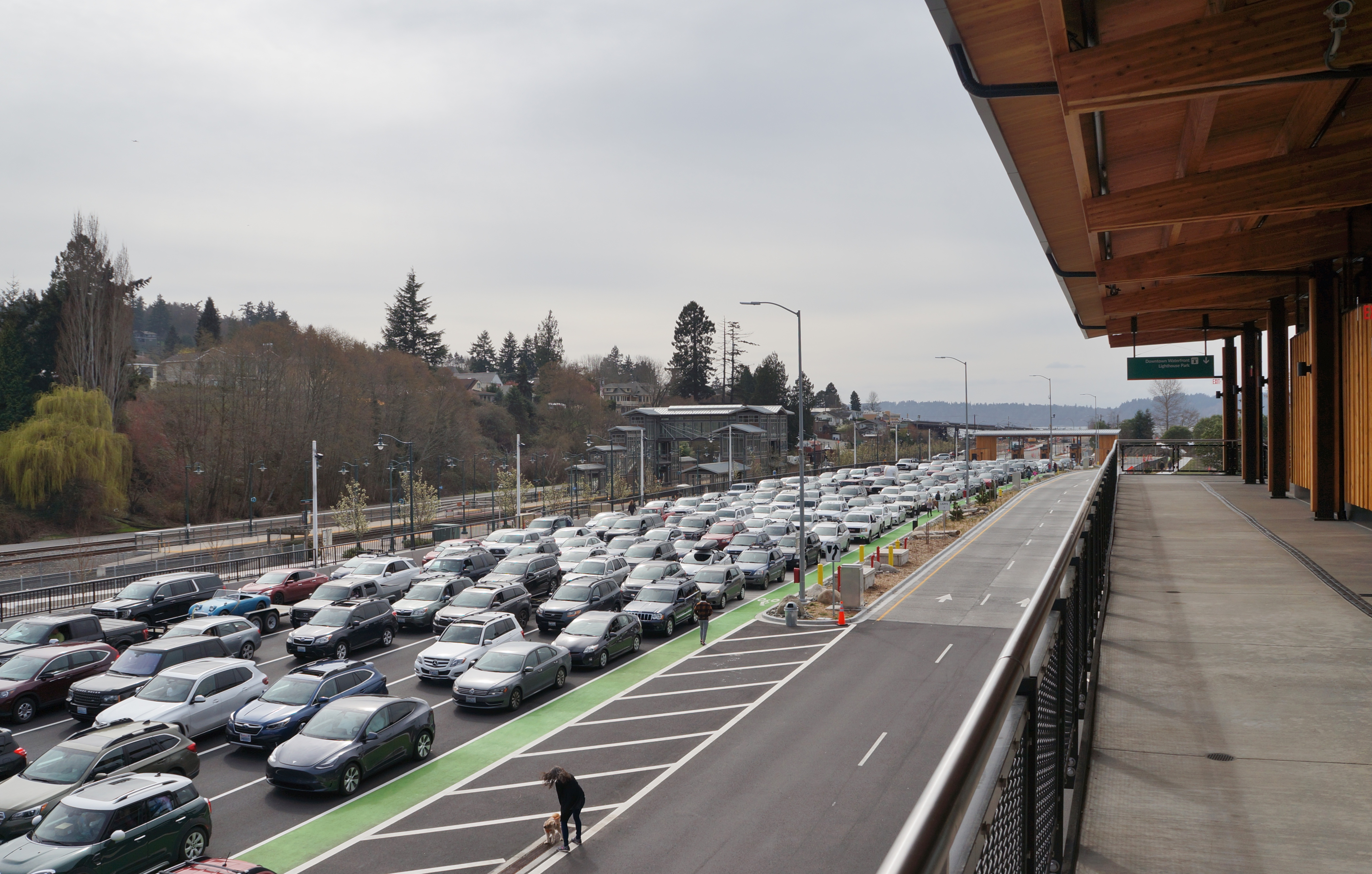
The holding area and exit lanes

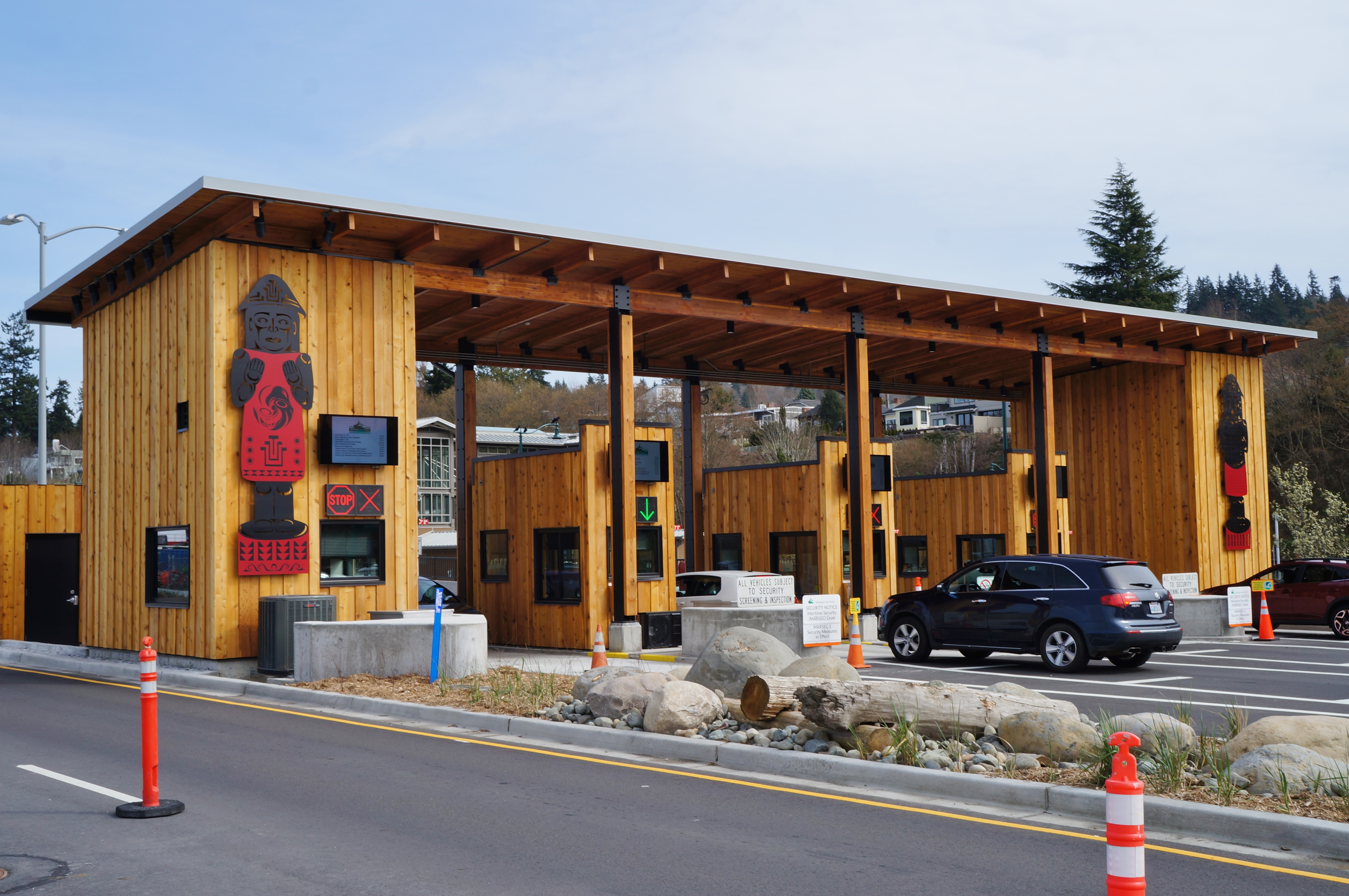
The tollbooths for vehicle traffic

The ferry system serves 20 terminals on Puget Sound and in the San Juan Islands that are designed to accommodate certain classes of its fleet. Most terminals have one or two slips from which ferries can load vehicles and some have an additional tie-up slip for overnight use outside of revenue service. The slip is typically connected to land by a trestle bridge and to the ferry vessel via a movable transfer span that is hoisted by a tower. Some terminals have an overhead loading walkway for passengers that connects the terminal's waiting area to the vessel, where a gangplank is lowered onto the deck. At terminals without an overhead walkway, such as in the San Juan Islands, walk-on passengers travel down the slip and board the vehicle deck alongside cyclists. The interior of the waiting area includes seating, restrooms, drinking fountains, vending machines for snacks, ticket kiosks, a ticket booth, brochures and information stands, and public art. Some terminals also have a separate office for supervisors that includes a break room, lockers, and a bedroom for overnight use.

Each terminal has a designated holding area for vehicles that have passed through tollbooths and are prepared to board a vessel. They are divided into lanes that board in order; vehicles carrying ferry employees or passengers with medical exemptions granted by the agency board first, along with cyclists and motorcyclists. At some terminals, the holding area has its own set of restrooms and a turnstile gate that allows passengers in vehicles to exit and re-enter the fenced area. A designated queue lane on the shoulder of highways approaching the terminal is used during busy sailing periods. The lanes are monitored by Washington State Patrol officers, who are able to issue a $139 citation for line-cutting and direct vehicles to be back of the queue. A hotline to report line-cutters to WSF was set up in 2010; violators are issued warnings in the mail until the program was shut down in 2021. Some terminals also have parking lots that are owned by WSF, local governments, or private companies.

The flagship terminal of Washington State Ferries is Colman Dock in Downtown Seattle, which serves 9 million annual passengers on the system's Bainbridge Island and Bremerton routes. It has three slips for the state ferries and an adjacent terminal for the Kitsap Fast Ferries and King County Water Taxi passenger-only routes. Colman Dock was reopened in 2022 after a five-year construction project that replaced the old terminal at the site with a 20,000-square-foot (1,900 m^{2}) waiting area and new spaces. Most of the terminals in the ferry system are owned and operated directly by Washington State Ferries; the four facilities in the San Juan Islands are contracted out to private operators who also own nearby stores. From 1976 to 2004, four nuns from the Franciscan Sisters of the Eucharist ran the Shaw Island terminal and its adjacent general store; their contract included operation of the hydraulic ramps for the transfer span and directing traffic in the holding area. The terminal in Sidney, British Columbia, is owned by the town's government and operated by BC Ferries, the province's system; both entities charge a docking fee to Washington State Ferries for use of the terminal.

The Washington State Transportation Commission regulates the name of the terminals. In 2010, it approved the renaming of the Keystone terminal on Whidbey Island for the nearby city of Coupeville after lobbying from local officials and business leaders.

Washington State Ferries terminals
Terminal	County	Year built (Note: Reflects the date that the current structure was built)	Slips	Connections
Anacortes	Skagit	1959	2	
Bainbridge Island	Kitsap	1966	2	
Bremerton	Kitsap	1990	2	Kitsap Fast Ferries; Kitsap Foot Ferries
Clinton	Island	1987	2	
Coupeville	Island	1979	1	
Edmonds	Snohomish	1952	1	Amtrak; Sounder
Fauntleroy	King	1957	1	
Friday Harbor	San Juan	1968	2	
Kingston	Kitsap	1986	2	Kitsap Fast Ferries
Lopez Island	San Juan	1980	1	
Mukilteo	Snohomish	2020	1	Sounder
Orcas Island	San Juan	1959	1	
Point Defiance	Pierce	1958	1	
Port Townsend	Jefferson	1983	2	
Seattle – Colman Dock	King	2022	3	Kitsap Fast Ferries; King County Water Taxi; Amtrak; Link light rail Sounder
Shaw Island	San Juan	1974	1	
Sidney, B.C.	—	1959	1	
Southworth	Kitsap	1958	1	Kitsap Fast Ferries
Tahlequah	King	1958	1	
Vashon	King	1957	2	King County Water Taxi

== Service ==
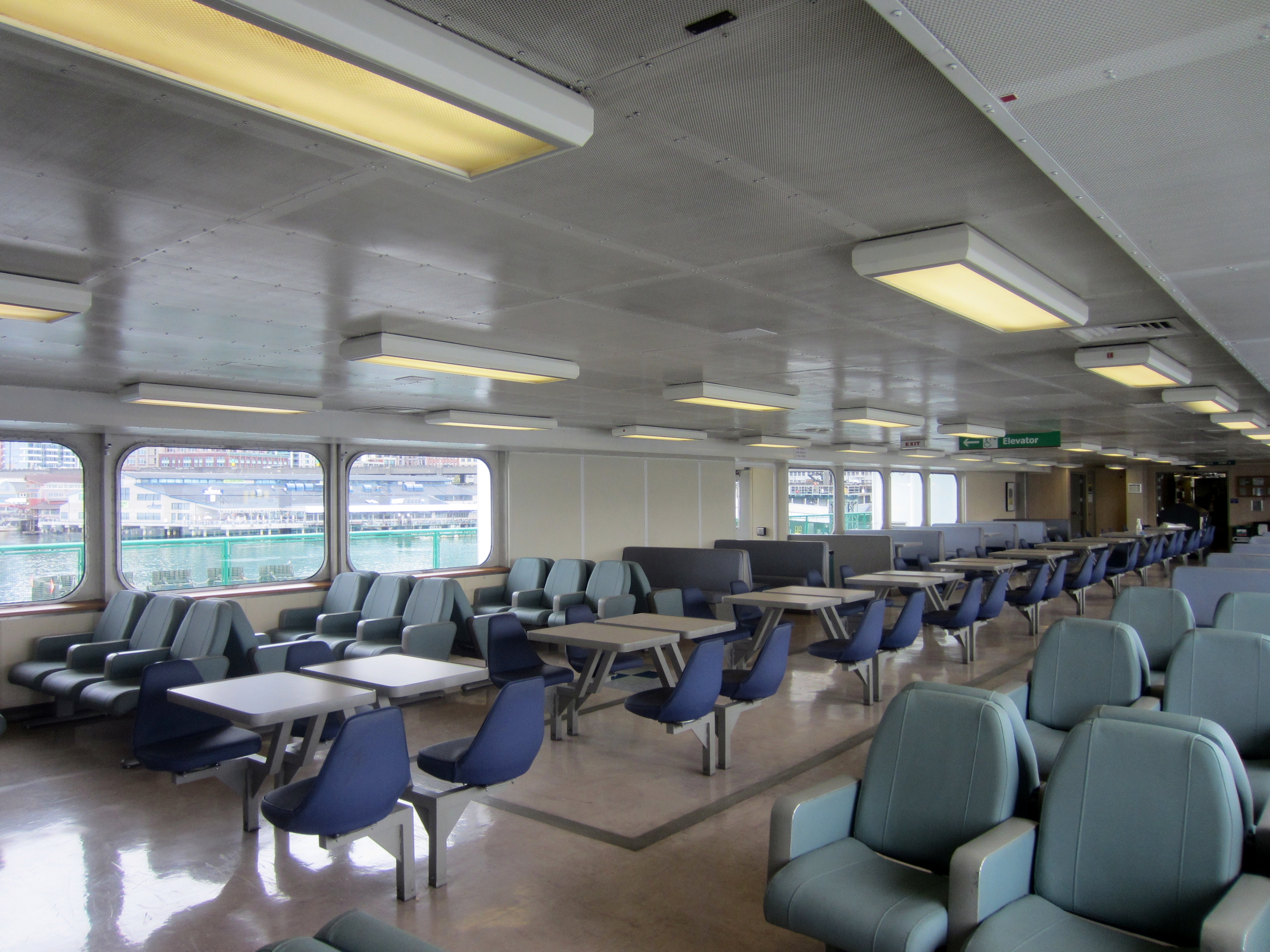
Passenger cabin on MV Kaleetan, 2016

The ferry system had 145,231 scheduled sailings during fiscal year 2025, of which 98.4 percent were completed. Over 2,400 trips were cancelled, primarily because of crew shortages, schedule resets, and mechanical issues. The system adjusts its schedules during four annual "sailing seasons", with the highest level of service between June and September to accommodate larger passenger volumes. The earliest year-round sailings in the system are around 4:00 a.m. on several routes; service generally lasts until midnight for most routes, with some sailings as late as 1:30 a.m. or 2:10 a.m. Additional service is provided on some major holidays and weekends, such as Memorial Day and Labor Day, as well as for special events. A vessel typically takes 20 minutes to unload and load passengers and vehicles at a terminal.

Vehicle slot reservations, released in tranches up to several months in advance, are available for the Port Townsend–Coupeville and Anacortes–San Juan Islands routes due to their limited capacity and high demand. These reservations cover up to 90 percent of available vehicle space on a sailing, with the rest allocated to standby traffic. Commercial and oversize vehicles, such as semi-trucks, that exceed the maximum vehicle dimensions or have a gross vehicle weight over 80,000 pounds (36,000 kg) must receive written approval from Washington State Ferries to drive onto a vessel. A 2024 study estimated that an average of 754 trucks used the ferry system per day and transported up to $3.49 million in cargo and other goods on a daily basis. The ferries also have unpublished sailings for vehicles that transport hazardous materials, such as gasoline, which other passengers and vehicles are prohibited from boarding.

The route schedules are referred to by the number of assigned vessels; for example, "two-boat" service refers to a reduced schedule due to the lack of a third vessel. If a vessel is unavailable for more than 24 hours, a relief vessel can be recalled from another route and reassigned depending on needs and terminal compatibility. Reassignments are also made for vessels scheduled to undergo regular maintenance and inspections, which can take several weeks. During longer service disruptions, Washington State Ferries has leased passenger-only ferries from private operators to provide temporary sailings if another ferry is unavailable. The system is not permitted to operate passenger-only service on a permanent basis under state law; from 2022 to 2026, the state government funded seven additional trips on the Kitsap Fast Ferries route between Bremerton and Seattle to supplement weekday ferry service during a shortage of available vessels. In the event that a terminal is unavailable for planned work or an unplanned disruption, ferries in Puget Sound are to be redirected to alternative terminals.

=== Ridership ===
Annual ridership, 2002–present
Year	Vehicles	Passengers	Total	%±
2002	11,009,262	14,132,205	25,141,467	—
2003	10,819,196	13,557,080	24,376,276	-3.0%
2004	10,828,312	13,264,024	24,092,336	-1.2%
2005	10,801,196	13,016,170	23,817,366	-1.1%
2006	10,850,232	13,087,314	23,937,546	0.5%
2007	10,674,166	13,034,931	23,709,097	-1.0%
2008	10,010,941	12,721,853	22,732,794	-4.1%
2009	10,064,294	12,673,416	22,737,710	0.0%
2010	10,101,190	12,350,214	22,451,404	-1.3%
2011	9,977,372	12,252,669	22,230,041	-1.0%
2012	9,974,874	12,226,622	22,201,496	-0.1%
2013	10,082,448	12,454,581	22,537,029	1.5%
2014	10,226,543	12,967,117	23,193,660	2.9%
2015	10,479,752	13,402,575	23,882,327	3.0%
2016	10,546,355	13,658,540	24,204,895	1.4%
2017	10,641,368	13,818,677	24,460,045	1.1%
2018	10,761,822	13,925,216	24,687,038	0.9%
2019	10,452,119	13,432,670	23,884,789	-3.2%
2020	7,629,223	6,357,479	13,986,702	-41.4%
2021	8,879,300	8,400,579	17,279,879	23.5%
2022	8,598,475	8,775,694	17,374,169	0.5%
2023	8,970,374	9,691,160	18,661,534	7.4%
2024	9,072,325	10,076,356	19,148,681	2.6%
2025	9,421,912	10,686,633	20,108,545	5.0%

In 2025, Washington State Ferries carried a total of 20,108,545 passengers and 9,421,912 vehicles; it averaged 42,500 passengers on weekdays in the first quarter of 2026. Walk-on boardings accounted for 42 percent of passenger boardings across all routes. The total ridership in 2025 was a 5 percent increase from the previous year, attributed to the restoration of the full domestic schedule and a decrease in canceled sailings. The system is the busiest in the United States, ahead of the passenger-only Staten Island Ferry in New York City, and second-busiest in the Pacific Northwest behind BC Ferries in Canada. Washington State Ferries also carries the third-most passengers of any public transit system in the state, behind Sound Transit and King County Metro. In 2013, the system carried 22.4 million passengers and ranked third globally behind İDO in Istanbul, Turkey, and Transtejo & Soflusa in Lisbon, Portugal. It also carried the second-most vehicles out of any system, behind Fjord1 in Norway.

The ferries are considered a major tourist attraction in Washington state in addition to their use as a commuter and cargo service. The U.S. Census Bureau estimated that 3.8 percent of workers in Kitsap County commuted using a ferry in 2024. Washington State Ferries recorded its highest ridership in 1999, when it carried over 26.8 million total passengers and 11.5 million vehicles. Use of the ferries fell to under 14 million in 2020 during the COVID-19 pandemic, which was also marked by a higher rate of cancelled sailings. Ridership began to increase the following year and had recovered to over 19 million by 2024 with gains in the number of walk-on passengers. Peak ridership in the summer months also returned, with four days in July 2025 reaching over 90,000 total passengers—the highest mark since August 2019. Washington State Ferries also draws more than 300,000 boardings during the Memorial Day and Labor Day holiday weekends; the two-week period around Christmas typically draws 700,000 passengers.

=== Fares ===
The state ferry system has fares that vary based on the route and direction of travel, age of the passenger, dimensions of the vehicle, and other factors. As of October 2025, the lowest round-trip adult fare in the system is $6.95 for the Mukilteo–Clinton route, while the highest is $17.50 for the Anacortes–San Juan Islands route. Discounts are available for senior citizens and passengers with disabilities. On most routes that cross Puget Sound, passenger fares are only charged in the westbound direction and are priced as round trips. Passenger tickets are dispensed at staffed ticket booths at terminals, self-serve kiosk machines, and tollbooths that also collect vehicle fares; they are valid for 90 days. Multi-use and monthly passes are sold for all fare types through the agency's online store. An electronic ticketing system, named Wave2Go, was introduced in February 2007 to replace ticket books for frequent riders with a scannable card that is reloaded at kiosks. Washington State Ferries also accepts the ORCA card, a fare smart card platform used by most transit systems in the Seattle metropolitan area that can load multi-use and monthly passes.

Fares are set by the Washington State Transportation Commission and reviewed every two years to account for projected financial needs for operations and capital projects. A surcharge of 25 percent is added during the peak season from May through September on most routes, with the San Juan Islands route charged 35 percent; it does not apply to discounted or multi-use fares. Since October 2022, all fares on the ferry system for passengers under the age of 19 years old have been free as part of a state transportation funding package. Nearly half of the operating budget for Washington State Ferries is funded with fares collected from passengers and vehicle drivers; the farebox recovery ratio was 49.8 percent in 2024, a slight decrease from 50.6 percent in 2023. The state government's subsidy per rider was $9.05, while the overall subsidy was $4.79, and $18.76 was spent per passenger trip. The rest of the budget is derived from the state government, which collects a gas tax and fees on driver's licenses and other items. A dedicated motor vehicle excise tax (MVET) was used to fund ferry operations until it was removed by Initiative 695, passed by voters in 1999.

== Operations ==
In 2024, Washington State Ferries (officially the WSDOT Ferries Division) had an operating budget of $353.8 million, mostly derived from fares and the state government, and a capital budget of $208.7 million. The active ferries traveled a total of 759,247 miles (1,221,890 km) in revenue service and carried nearly 18.9 million total unlinked passenger trips. As of July 2025, Washington State Ferries had 1,569 full-time employees, of which half are classified as deck workers. The system previously had over 1,900 employees in 2019, but suffered a shortage of available crewmembers immediately after the COVID-19 pandemic that led to 30 percent of scheduled sailings being cancelled. Washington State Ferries employees are represented by 16 unions that have signed 13 total collective bargaining agreements. Each vessel requires between 10 to 16 crew members depending on the size of the boat; they operate in two or three daily shifts with the exception of the engine room, which uses two 12-hour shifts for continual monitoring. The captain and mates are licensed officers, while deckhands and ordinary crew are unlicensed but require several years of maritime experience.

The primary maintenance facility for the system is at Eagle Harbor on Bainbridge Island, just west of the city's ferry terminal. WSF built its Eagle Harbor facility in 1962 and uses it to also store unused or recently retired vessels. WSF also has other shops on Bainbridge Island, including in-house carpenters that maintain and repair fixtures aboard ferries as well as at terminals, including windows, floors, and cables. The agency's headquarters and operations center was consolidated into a single building in the Belltown neighborhood of Seattle in 2005. It includes an emergency operations center that is staffed 24/7 and has direct radio links to two transmission towers near Issaquah and Quilcene. Outside contractors also conduct maintenance, rehabilitation, and inspections of the ferries at dedicated large drydocks on Puget Sound; another facility on Lake Union in Seattle is used for smaller vessels that can fit through the Ballard Locks on the Lake Washington Ship Canal. Onboard food service, primarily through the ship galley and vending machines, has been operated by contractor Sodexo Live (formerly Centerplate) since 2016. The galley offers food and alcoholic beverages from local companies, including Ivar's clam chowder and wine from Chateau Ste. Michelle. It served 1.6 million customers in 2024 and sold 10,000 US gallons (38,000 L) of clam chowder and nearly 150,000 soft pretzels.

The agency allows weddings and other celebrations to take place on board ferries with reservations and arrangements made in advance; no extra costs are charged for services. The scattering of cremated remains at sea is performed board state ferries with permission from WSF, who charge a fee of $150 and require the use of a biodegradable container or vessel. The ceremonies, scheduled outside of peak travel periods, take place during a temporary stop and are followed by an announcement and the sounding of the ferry's whistle. In 2024, a total of 190 memorials were performed aboard WSF vessels. The ferries are also mandated to stop for large marine mammals, including orcas and humpback whales, to avoid collisions or harming the animals. Whale sightings are reported to a multi-agency alert system and supplemented by electronic listening arrays placed in the Salish Sea; in 2025, there were 687 whale sightings aboard the WSF system.

=== Safety and security ===
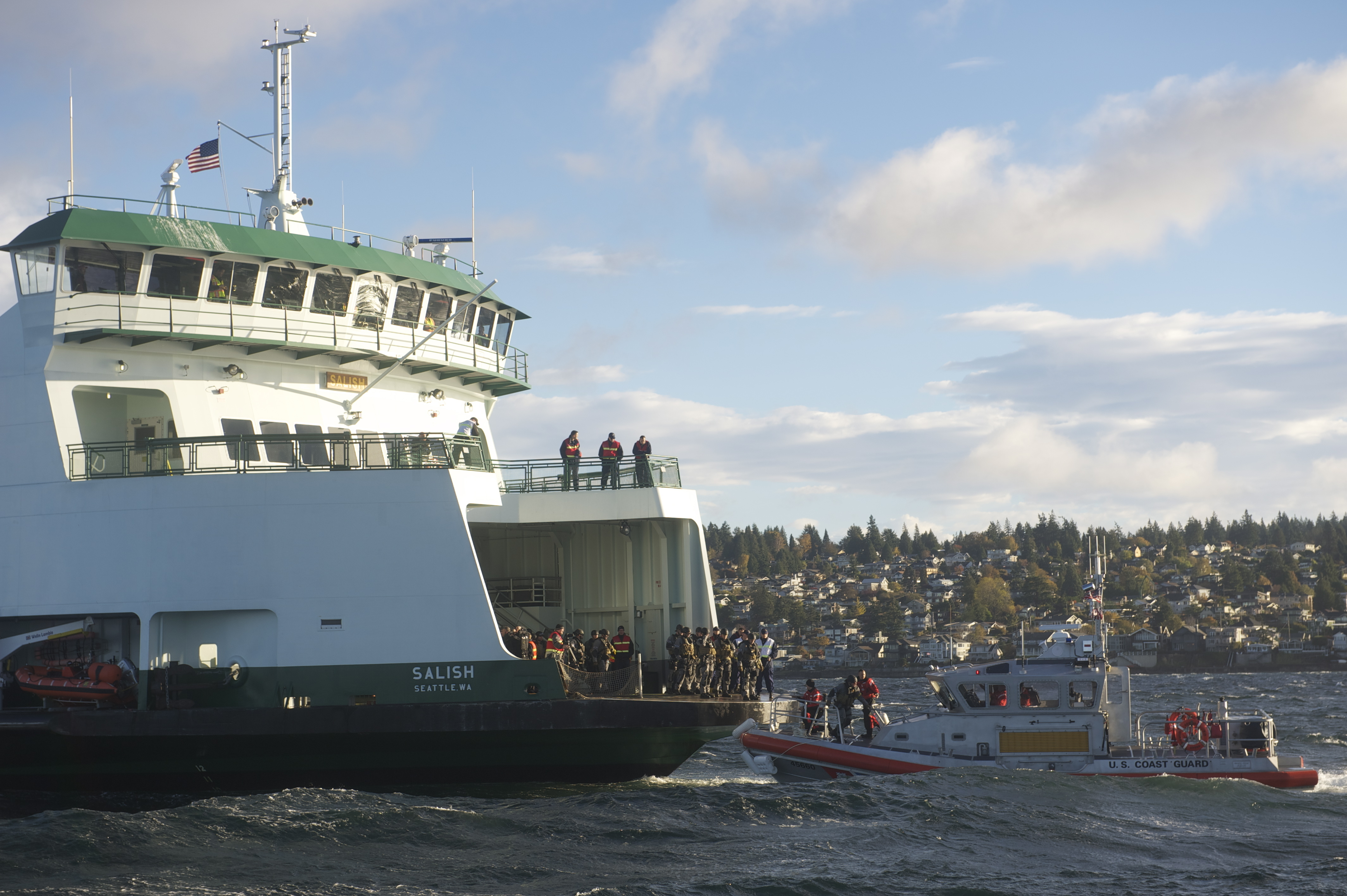
A safety drill on MV Salish conducted by the U.S. Coast Guard and local law enforcement in 2012

As of 2023, the ferry system had no fatalities related to its vessels' operations in its operating history. In fiscal year 2025, there were 36 reported injuries to passengers on ferries—a rate of 1.9 injuries to passengers per million boardings—and 8.2 injuries to crew per 10,000 hours in revenue service. Several vessels have been damaged in collisions or other incidents that required extensive repairs. MV Elwha, in service from 1968 to 2019, ran aground on underwater rocks and reefs several times; after one of the collisions, Elwha Rock was named in honor of the vessel. The system's terminals have also been damaged by vessels that have collided with docks and other facilities, including several in the 1980s and 1990s. The first collision between ferry vessels occurred on September 6, 1991, when MV Sealth hit MV Kitsap in Rich Passage near Bainbridge Island; the captain of the Kitsap was found negligent for not slowing in heavy fog. The incident resulted in no injuries and $37,000 in damage to the vessels.

The vessels of the fleet are equipped with life rafts that can each carry up to 150 people and are deployed from the vehicle and passenger decks. Several sets of inflatable evacuation slides, similar to those use on commercial airplanes, are also deployed onto floating platforms. All ferries also have life jackets for passengers that are distributed by crewmembers in an emergency. The required number of life rafts is set by the U.S. Coast Guard, who allowed Washington State Ferries to operate under an "alternate compliance" plan from 2002 to 2017 to increase passenger capacities. The plan reduced the number of life rafts on each individual vessel with the assumption that the second ferry assigned to the route would be able to rescue passengers and provide the missing capacity. After the plan was suspended, the ferry system retrofitted its older vessels to add more life rafts in order to maintain their passenger capacities. Washington State Ferries had previously operated vessels with fewer life rafts that could carry as little as 7.8 percent of the listed passenger capacity until the early 2000s, when more life rafts and floating platforms were added to accommodate 98 percent of expected loads.

As part of the state highway system, Washington State Ferries is within the jurisdiction of the Washington State Patrol (WSP), which has several teams that patrol vessels, terminals, and other facilities. WSP also provides officers who direct traffic at some terminals and K-9 units for surveillance and screening. On the international Anacortes–Sidney route, WSP coordinates with the U.S. Border Patrol and the Royal Canadian Mounted Police for some activities; passengers on international sailings are also required to clear customs facilities at the terminals. The U.S. Coast Guard is also responsible for security and first response activities within the ferry system through the Maritime Safety and Security Team. The team conducts escort missions in which armed patrol boats sail alongside a ferry to enforce a 500-yard (460 m) security zone on random sailings, which increased following the September 11 attacks in 2001. The Coast Guard also manages a vessel traffic service to monitor busy waterways, including areas around the ferries, and conducts searches for missing passengers. Washington State Ferries also hosts safety drills and other security exercises with WSP, the Coast Guard, local law enforcement agencies, fire departments, and private companies. The ferries also regularly assist in maritime rescues of other vessels; in 2025, the system reported 46 lifesaving events.

Security searches, including random screenings of vehicles, began in response to the September 11 attacks but were suspended in June 2002 after a review of potential terrorist threats and opposition from the American Civil Liberties Union's Washington chapter. Washington State Ferries implemented its full security plan in July 2004 to comply with requirements from the Coast Guard and the Department of Homeland Security. Additional K-9 units from WSP were deployed to conduct random searches on a percentage of vehicles that varies based on the MARSEC level. The Coast Guard previously proposed full body scanners for walk-on passengers—limited to 20 percent at low MARSEC levels and required for all at the highest level—amid criticism and objections from the ferry system.

== Fleet ==
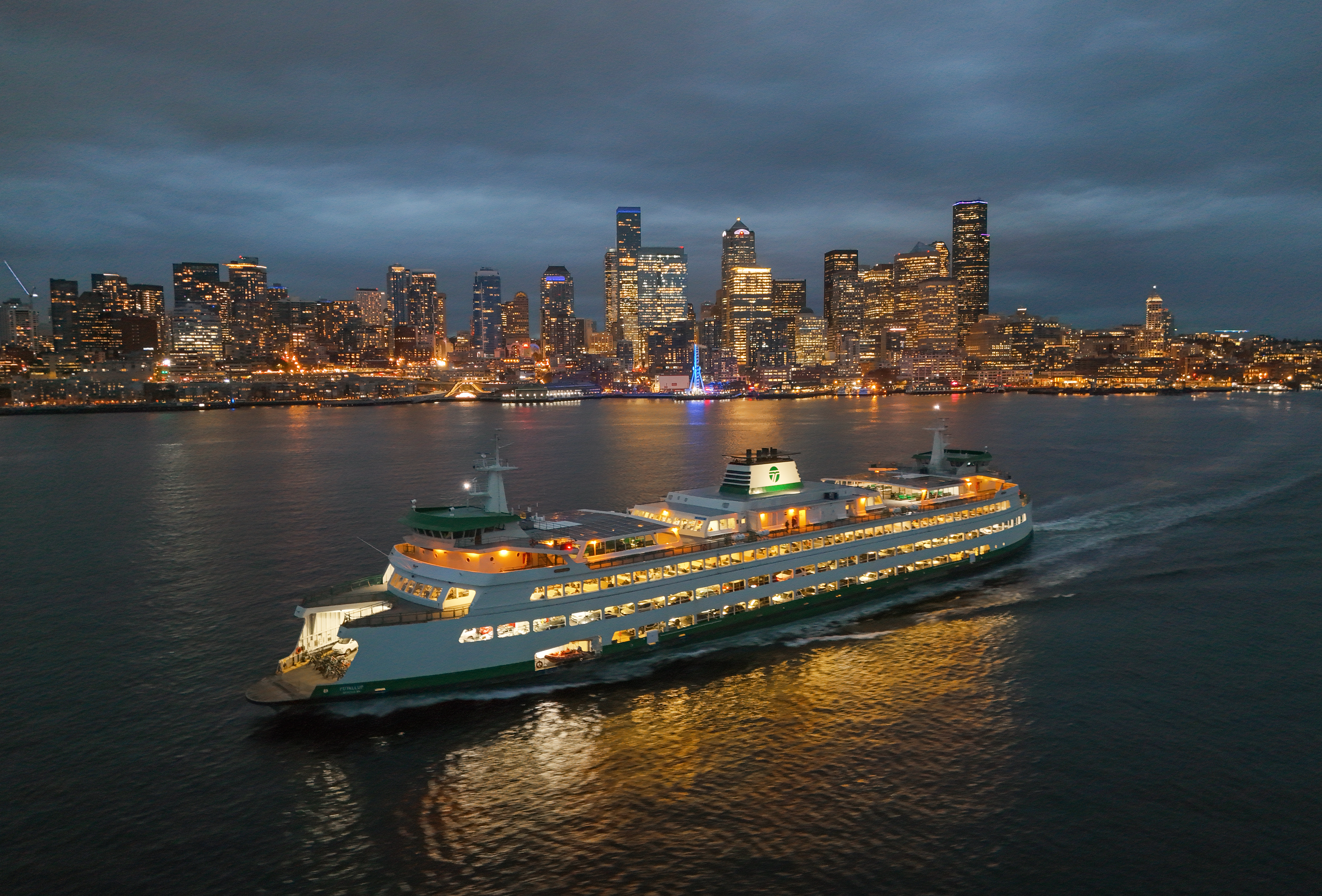
MV Puyallup, one of the largest ferries, departing from Seattle

As of 2025, Washington State Ferries has a fleet of 21 ferries that serve its routes. The ferries use a double-ended design with a pair of wheelhouses, crew quarters, propellers, and rudders that are mirrored to allow for operation in either direction. They are roll-on/roll-off with at least one vehicle deck above the engine rooms; for vessels with multiple vehicle decks, a ramp connects the upper and lower parking areas. The passenger areas of the ferries are above the vehicle area and connected by stairs and elevators. They comprise at least one indoor cabin with seating, tables, restrooms, vending machines, and a staffed galley. The outdoor pedestrian deck includes a sun deck with bench seating and a "picklefork" at each end that is divided into two halves to allow for the vehicle deck to be visible from the wheelhouse. Walk-on passengers board from gangplanks that lower onto the picklefork at terminals equipped with an overhead walkway.

The ferries are named by the Washington State Transportation Commission and are derived from the state's Native American tribes and their languages. The tradition originated with the Puget Sound Navigation Company in the 1930s and was adopted by the state government in 1958; the final vessel with a non-indigenous name was the Evergreen State, which was retired in 2015. The fleet is painted with a standard livery of white with green trim; the Washington State Department of Transportation logo is painted on the stack at the center. After 50 years of state service, a commemorative gold stripe is painted on the center stack. Washington State Ferries also allows the use of wraps for advertising through contractors, but reviewed the policy in 2023 after a Coca-Cola advertisement drew widespread criticism, including from governor Jay Inslee. The interior of the passenger cabin typically uses neutral colors for its seating and floors, which have been described as "like an airport waiting room from the 1980s" and "utilitarian in appearance". Some ferries are stocked with jigsaw puzzles by passengers or crewmembers and left for public use. Washington State Ferries began offering paid Wi-Fi access aboard vessels on some routes in 2004 that was expanded with a contract awarded to Boingo Wireless in 2008. The service was discontinued in 2016 after the contract expired; it had largely been replaced by more widespread cellular networks, but a new pilot program is scheduled to begin in 2026.

The largest ferries in the system are the three Jumbo Mark II class vessels, which carry 202 vehicles and 1,791 passengers. Their passenger capacity was originally listed as 2,500 until the U.S. Coast Guard revised their rules on vehicle stability in 2011 to account for a 25-pound (11 kg) difference in the weight of an average adult passenger. The total capacity is determined by the ability to evacuate passengers from the vessel in a waterborne emergency through life rafts or capacity on other vessels assigned to the route. The number of passengers boarding is determined using handheld counter devices that are logged by ferry personnel; in the event of an overloaded vessel, it returns to port and disembarks passengers until it falls under the limit. The smallest vessels in the fleet belong to the Kwa-di Tabil class, which carry 64 vehicles and 748 passengers. As of 2024, the average ferry in the fleet is 33.1 years old; they have an expected lifespan of 60 years and are scheduled to undergo a "mid-life refurbishment" at 30 years that upgrades their propulsion, navigation, and safety systems. The ferries are inspected in a drydock on a rotating basis and receive annual certification from the U.S. Coast Guard. As of 2023, 9 of the 21 active ferries were considered to be in good condition; the system averaged 12.1 weeks out of service per vessel in 2025 due to planned maintenance and unscheduled issues.

Washington State Ferries primarily uses diesel fuel to power the engines aboard its vessels, which spin a generator to create electricity. The agency used 15.2 million gallons of diesel fuel in 2024, of which 9.4 percent was biodiesel; the use of biodiesel is mandated by state law and began in 2009. Up to 19 million gallons of diesel fuel was used annually prior to the COVID-19 pandemic, when the ferries had an expanded schedule. The ferries are refueled every two to three weeks during an overnight shift at designated terminals or a fuel pier at Harbor Island in Seattle. Washington State Ferries is the largest contributor to greenhouse gas emissions in the state government and has been the subject of plans to electrify the fleet since 2018. By 2040, the agency intends to build 16 new hybrid-electric ferries, convert six others to have hybrid propulsion, and build charging stations at 16 terminals. The first vessel to undergo conversion to use hybrid-electric propulsion was MV Wenatchee, which returned to service in July 2025 after two years of work. Wenatchee has two battery rooms with 864 battery cells that store 5.7 megawatt-hours of energy for the engines. Further work on converting the Jumbo Mark II fleet to hybrid propulsion was delayed by Washington governor Bob Ferguson in early 2025 in favor of restoring service on the routes. The first on-shore charging stations are expected to be constructed in 2029 at the Clinton and Mukilteo terminals.

Vigor Industrial (formerly Todd Shipyard) in Seattle has been the primary shipbuilder for all of the system's ferries since 1997; a state law previously required new ferries to be built in Washington, but was revised in 2015 to allow outside bidding. Vigor had built the first four vessels in the Olympic class from 2011 to 2018 and were initially announced as the contractor for the a hybrid-electric vessel based on the Olympic class. After cost overruns and other disagreements, Washington State Ferries opened an invitation for bids for an initial set of three hybrid vessels that included qualified firms from outside of the state. In July 2025, the state government selected a $714.5 million proposal from Eastern Shipbuilding of Panama City, Florida, ahead of another bid from a Washington company. The vessels are scheduled to begin delivery as soon as 2029 and use an electric propulsion system supplied by ABB. These ferries, the first to be built outside Washington in over 50 years, are planned to be based on the Olympic class with a capacity of 1,500 passengers and 164 vehicles. Governor Bob Ferguson announced a $1 billion addition to the proposed 2026 budget that would fund three more hybrid-electric vessels; the full electrification program is estimated to cost $6.2 billion. The system's first electric charging stations are planned to be constructed at five terminals, beginning with Colman Dock in 2029.

Active classes operated by Washington State Ferries (2025)
Class	Vessels	Image	Years built	Capacity		Length	Maximum speed	Notes
Class	Vessels	Image	Years built	Vehicles	Passengers	Length	Maximum speed	Notes
Evergreen State (1)	MV Tillikum	(MV Tillikum)	1959	87	596	310 ft 2 in (94.5 m)	13 kn (15 mph; 24 km/h)	Rebuilt in 1994; 2 vessels retired
Issaquah (6)	MV Issaquah; MV Kittitas; MV Kitsap; MV Cathlamet; MV Chelan; MV Sealth	(MV Chelan)	1979–1982	124 (Note: MV Sealth has a listed capacity of 90 vehicles.)	1,196 (Note: MV Chelan has a listed capacity of 1,090 passengers on international trips due to SOLAS Convention standards.)	328 ft 2 in (100.0 m)	16 kn (18 mph; 30 km/h)	Rebuilt in 1989–2005
Jumbo (2)	MV Spokane; MV Walla Walla	(MV Walla Walla)	1972–1973	188	1,793	440 ft 0 in (134.1 m)	18 kn (21 mph; 33 km/h)	Rebuilt in 2004–2005
Jumbo Mark II (3)	MV Tacoma; MV Wenatchee; MV Puyallup	(MV Wenatchee)	1997–1999	202	1,791	460 ft 2 in (140.3 m)	18 kn (21 mph; 33 km/h)	Wenatchee converted to battery–electric propulsion in 2025.
Kwa-di Tabil (3)	MV Chetzemoka; MV Salish; MV Kennewick	(MV Salish)	2010–2011	64	748	273 ft 10 in (83.5 m)	14 kn (16 mph; 26 km/h)	
Olympic (4)	MV Tokitae; MV Samish; MV Chimacum; MV Suquamish	(MV Suquamish)	2014–2018	144	1,500	362 ft 5 in (110.5 m)	17 kn (20 mph; 31 km/h)	
Super (2)	MV Kaleetan; MV Yakima	(MV Yakima)	1967	144	1,195	382 ft 2 in (116.5 m)	17 kn (20 mph; 31 km/h)	Rebuilt in 1999–2000; 2 vessels retired

=== Retired vessels ===
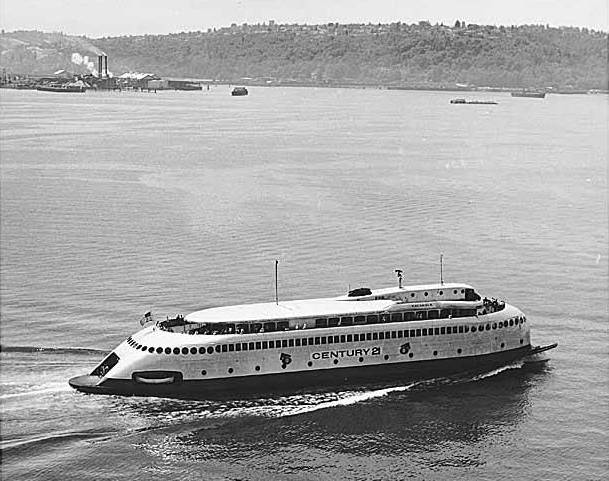
MV Kalakala, originally part of the Puget Sound Navigation Company fleet, was retired in 1967

From 1951 to 2007, a total of 18 older ferries were retired as they were replaced by newer vessels that had been purpose-built for use on the state ferry system. Many entered service in 1951 as part of direct transfers from the Puget Sound Navigation Company, while others had been acquired from systems in other areas of the United States. Among the retired vessels was MV Kalakala, an Art Deco vessel that was the flagship of the Black Ball Line and served in the state ferry system until her retirement in 1967. She was loaned to run the international Port Angeles–Victoria route for five years in the late 1950s after Black Ball withdrew their service. The four largest vessels of the Steel Electric class, built in 1927 and sold to the Black Ball Line in 1940, were used by the state ferry system until they were pulled from the fleet in November 2007 due to corrosion issues. From 1986 to 2009, Washington State Ferries also operated five high-speed catamarans used on passenger-only routes that could carry 250 to 350 riders per sailing.

Most of the retired WSF vessels have been sold through public auctions, including on eBay, to bidders who sought to reuse or scrap them. The ferries are docked at the Eagle Harbor Maintenance Facility and stripped of parts that can be reused on other vessels or repurposed locally. The former air horn from MV Hyak was installed at Climate Pledge Arena for use as a goal horn during Seattle Kraken games. After a failed tow attempt by an Ecuadorian businessman, MV Elwha was sold to an Everett-based shipbuilder for use as an office and warehouse. Other vessels have been reused by other public and private operators, including MV Kulshan for the Steamship Authority in Massachusetts and MV Hiyu as a party venue in the Seattle area. Several have also been abandoned by their new owners, including MV Olympic on Ketron Island, leading to proposals to establish a ship breaking yard in Washington.

== See also ==
- Alaska Marine Highway
- BC Ferries
- Ferries in Washington (state)
- Inter-Island Ferry Authority
- Keller Ferry
- King County Water Taxi
- Kitsap Fast Ferries
