= Breidablick, Washington =

- Unincorporated community
- Location in Washington and the United States Breidablick (the United States)
- Coordinates: 47°48′07″N 122°38′58″W
- Country: United States
- State: Washington
- County: Kitsap
- Time zone: UTC-8 (Pacific (PST))
  - Summer (DST): UTC-7 (PDT)
- GNIS feature ID: 1512027

Breidablick /ˈbraɪdəblɪk/) is an unincorporated community in northern Kitsap County, Washington, U.S. The name comes from "Breidablik", a place in Nordic mythology, and was chosen in 1892 by Ole M. Abel, who had a post office and store on his homestead. It is located adjacent to Lofall on State Route 3, north of Poulsbo and Silverdale. Some area names still exist, including Breidablik Chapel and Breidablik Evergreen Cemetery. Two Breidablik Elementary Schools were built: the first opened in 1894 and closed in 1942; the second opened in 1990 and closed in 2013.
