= Seattle–Bainbridge Island ferry =

Ferry route in Seattle, Washington, U.S.

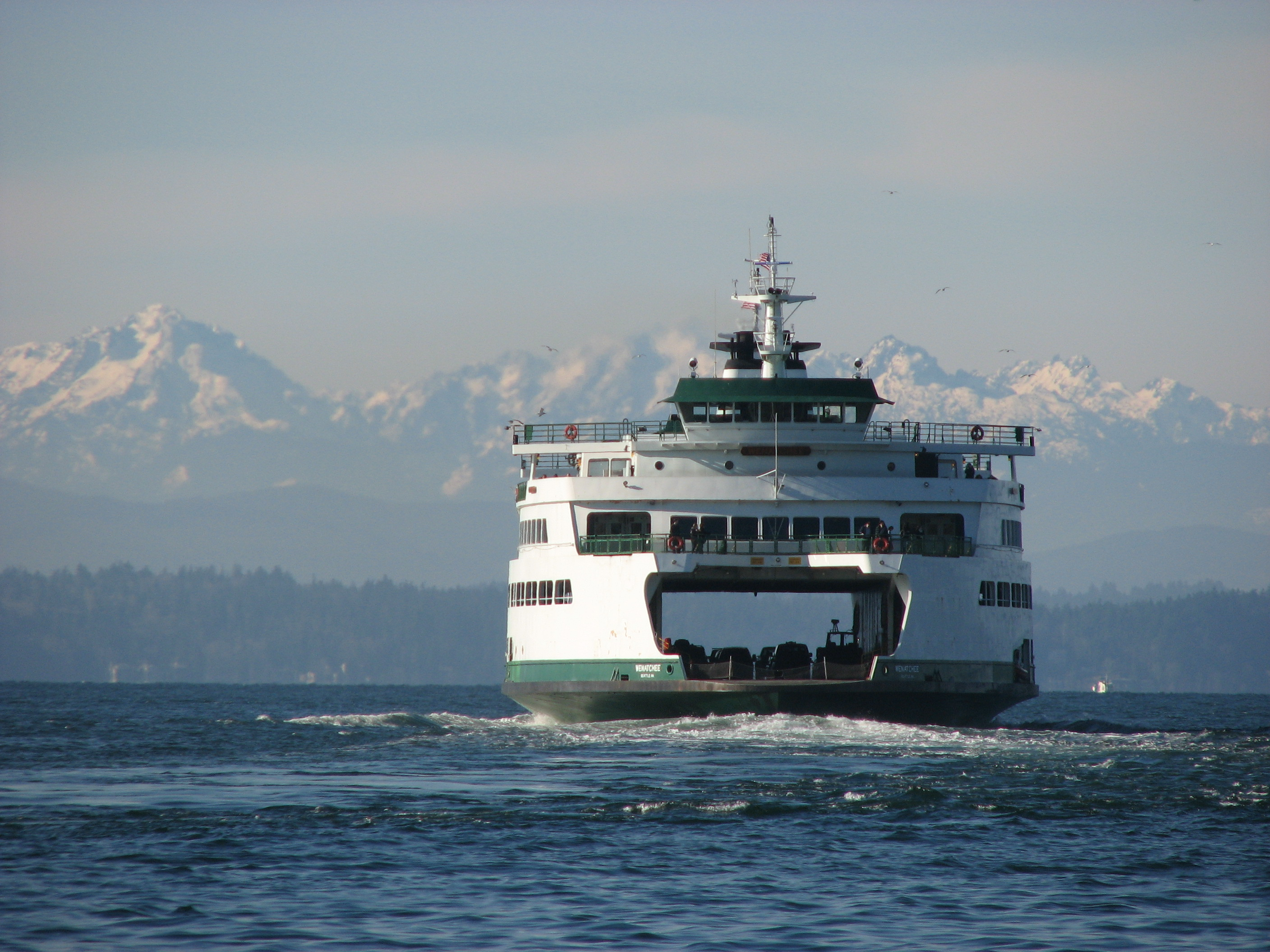
- Ferry Wenatchee en route to Bainbridge Island
- Waterway: Puget Sound
- Transit type: Auto/passenger ferry
- Route: Seattle–Bainbridge Island
- Carries: SR 305
- Operator: Washington State Ferries
- Travel time: 30-35 minutes (2018)
- No. of vessels: 2 Jumbo Mark-II-class ferries
- Yearly ridership: 4,905,490 passengers (2024)
- Yearly vehicles: 1,594,309 vehicles (2024)
- Connections at Bainbridge Island
- Bus: Kitsap Transit, Clallam Transit
- Road: SR 305
- Connections at Seattle
- Ship: King County Water Taxi
- Tram: Pioneer Square station
- Bus: King County Metro, Sound Transit Express
- Road: SR 519
Route map
Ferry terminals on the Seattle–Bainbridge Island route

The Seattle–Bainbridge ferry is a ferry route across Puget Sound between Seattle and Bainbridge Island, Washington. The route was called the Seattle–Winslow ferry before the city of Winslow annexed the rest of the island and changed its name. Since 1951 the only ferries employed on the route have belonged to the Washington state ferry system, currently the largest ferry system in the United States. The Seattle–Bainbridge Island route is the busiest in the system and was used by over 4.9 million total passengers in 2024.

== Description ==
This ferry route is 8.6 miles (13.8 km) long, with terminals at Colman Dock in Seattle and on Bainbridge Island, at Winslow. Next to the Winslow terminal is Eagle Harbor, the main shipyard for the Washington State Ferry system. The Seattle–Bainbridge Island route is the busiest in the Washington State Ferries system. In 2024, it carried a total of 4.9 million passengers, of which 2.1 million were walk-ons. A total of 1.6 million vehicles were carried, ranking third in the system.

== History ==
Before ferries were dominant on Puget Sound, the route was served by passenger and freight-carrying steamboats. The wooden steamship Florence K served the route for the Eagle Harbor Transportation Co., until 1915 when the company put the new steamer Bainbridge on the route, and shifted Florence K to the Seattle–Port Washington route.

In 1949, the Chippewa served on the route, except during summers, when the Chippewa was transferred to the Anacortes-San Juan Islands-Sidney route. From 1951 to 1968, the main ferry on the route was the Illahee which ran along with the Quinault (1951–1953), Evergreen State (1954–1959), and Tillikum (1959–1968), with the steam ferry San Mateo occasionally running as an extra boat.

In 1950, the Agate Pass Bridge opened, connecting the north end of Bainbridge Island to the Kitsap Peninsula. The bridge and ferry proved to be a faster option to travel between many parts of the Olympic Peninsula and Seattle, compared to the Seattle–Bremerton ferry route.

By 1968, demand on the Bainbridge Island ferry was exceeding vehicle capacity, so the Tillikum and Illahee were reassigned to the Edmonds–Kingston ferry, and replaced by the Super-class vessels Kaleetan and Elwha, both of which had capacities of 2,500 passengers and 160 automobiles. About five years later, in 1972–1973, the Super-class vessels were displaced by the larger Jumbo-class ferries Spokane and Walla Walla, which had a lower passenger capacity of 2,000 passengers, but room for 206 automobiles (later downrated to 188 vehicles). The Jumbo-class ferries remained in Bainbridge Island service for more than two decades until they were displaced in turn by the even larger Jumbo Mark-II-class vessels, the Tacoma and Wenatchee in 1997–1998, which returned a passenger capacity of 2,500 and a maximum of 202 vehicles.

Construction on a replacement for the Bainbridge Island terminal's pedestrian walkway began in 2022 due to the existing wooden structure's seismic vulnerability; the wooden pilings were also coated in creosote which had negative impacts on the marine environment. The new concrete and steel pilings were completed in mid-2023; the four-span walkway itself was lifted into place during a six-day period in September 2023. During the six days, the Bainbridge Island run was closed to vehicles, bicycles, and scooters due to the need for construction staging on the vehicle loading area. Construction was completed in 2024 at a cost of $33 million.

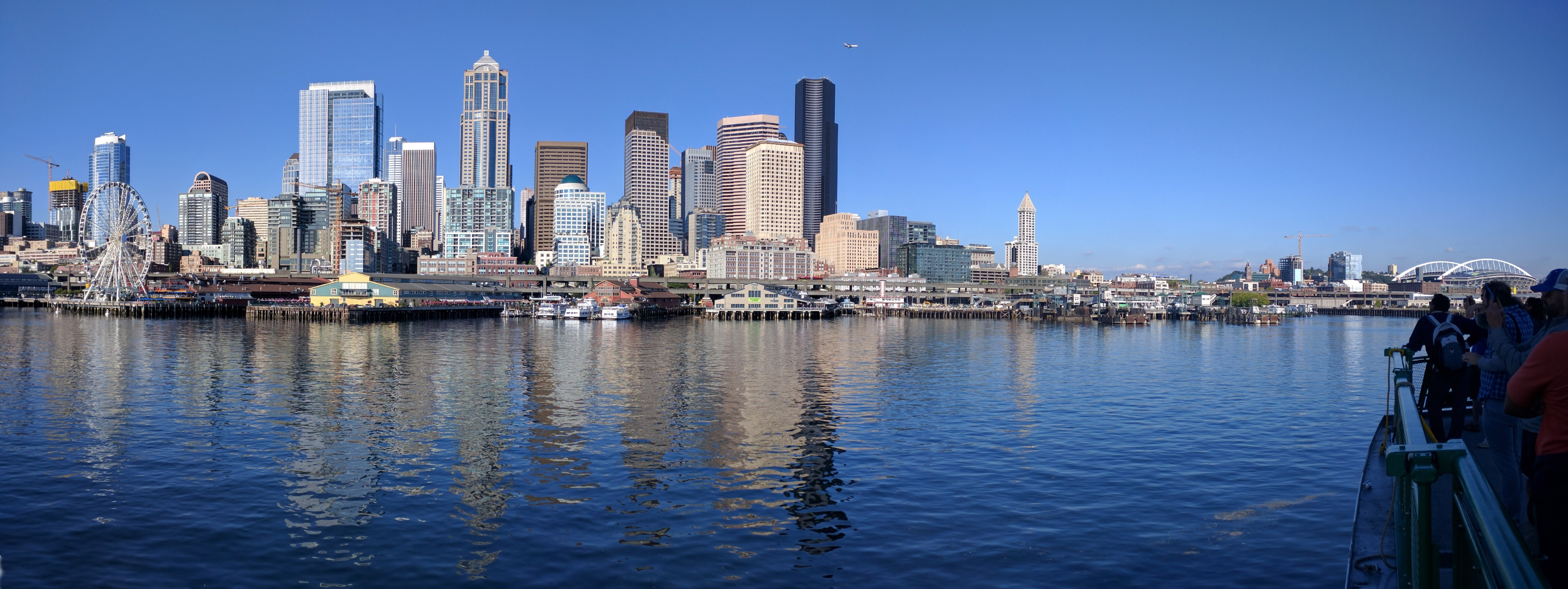
Seattle's waterfront from the Bainbridge Island ferry as it approaches the Seattle ferry terminal at Colman Dock

== See also ==
- Ferries in Washington State
