= MV Tacoma =

Ship built in 1997

- MV Tacoma off Colman Dock, Seattle

History
- Name: Tacoma
- Owner: Washington State Department of Transportation
- Operator: Washington State Ferries
- Port of registry: Seattle, Washington
- Route: Seattle–Bainbridge Island
- Builder: Todd Pacific Shipyards, Seattle, Washington
- Cost: $80 million
- Launched: August 29, 1996
- Acquired: August 18, 1997
- Maiden voyage: October 17, 1997
- In service: October 17, 1997
- Identification: IMO number: 9133977; MMSI number: 366772760; Callsign: WCX9244
- Status: In service
- Notes: Out of service between July 29, 2014 and March 27, 2015 due to catastrophic failure of electrical system.

General characteristics
- Class & type: Jumbo Mark-II-class auto/passenger ferry
- Length: 460 ft 2 in (140.3 m)
- Beam: 90 ft (27.4 m)
- Draft: 17 ft 3 in (5.3 m)
- Deck clearance: 15 ft 6 in (4.7 m)
- Installed power: Total 16,000 hp (12,000 kW) from 4 x EMD 16-710G Diesel-Electric engines
- Speed: 18 knots (33 km/h; 21 mph)
- Capacity: 2,500 passengers; 202 vehicles (max 60 commercial)

MV Tacoma is a Jumbo Mark-II-class ferry operated by Washington State Ferries. Launched in 1997, it was the first in its class in the Washington State Ferries fleet. Since delivery, the Tacoma has almost exclusively been assigned to the busy Seattle–Bainbridge Island route.

The Tacoma and its sister ship, the MV Wenatchee, suffered from excessive vibration during their early period of operation, until it was repaired during routine maintenance in 1999. The issue was addressed in the final Jumbo Mark II ferry, the MV Puyallup, before it launched.

== Electrical failure ==
On July 29, 2014, the vessel suffered a catastrophic electrical failure, in which most of the ship's electrical system was destroyed. The Tacoma lost power in Bainbridge Island's Eagle Harbor and dropped anchor to prevent her from beaching making it the "second time in 40 years that a state ferry was forced to drop anchor." The MV Sealth, which was serving the Seattle-Bremerton route at the time, made a detour up to Eagle Harbor to tow the Tacoma away from shore until tugboats could guide her back to the slip. The Tacoma remained out of service for nearly nine months while repairs were made. After four weeks of sea trials and approval from the United States Coast Guard, the Tacoma returned to service on the Seattle-Bainbridge route on March 28, 2015.
