= MV Wenatchee =

1998 Washington state ferry

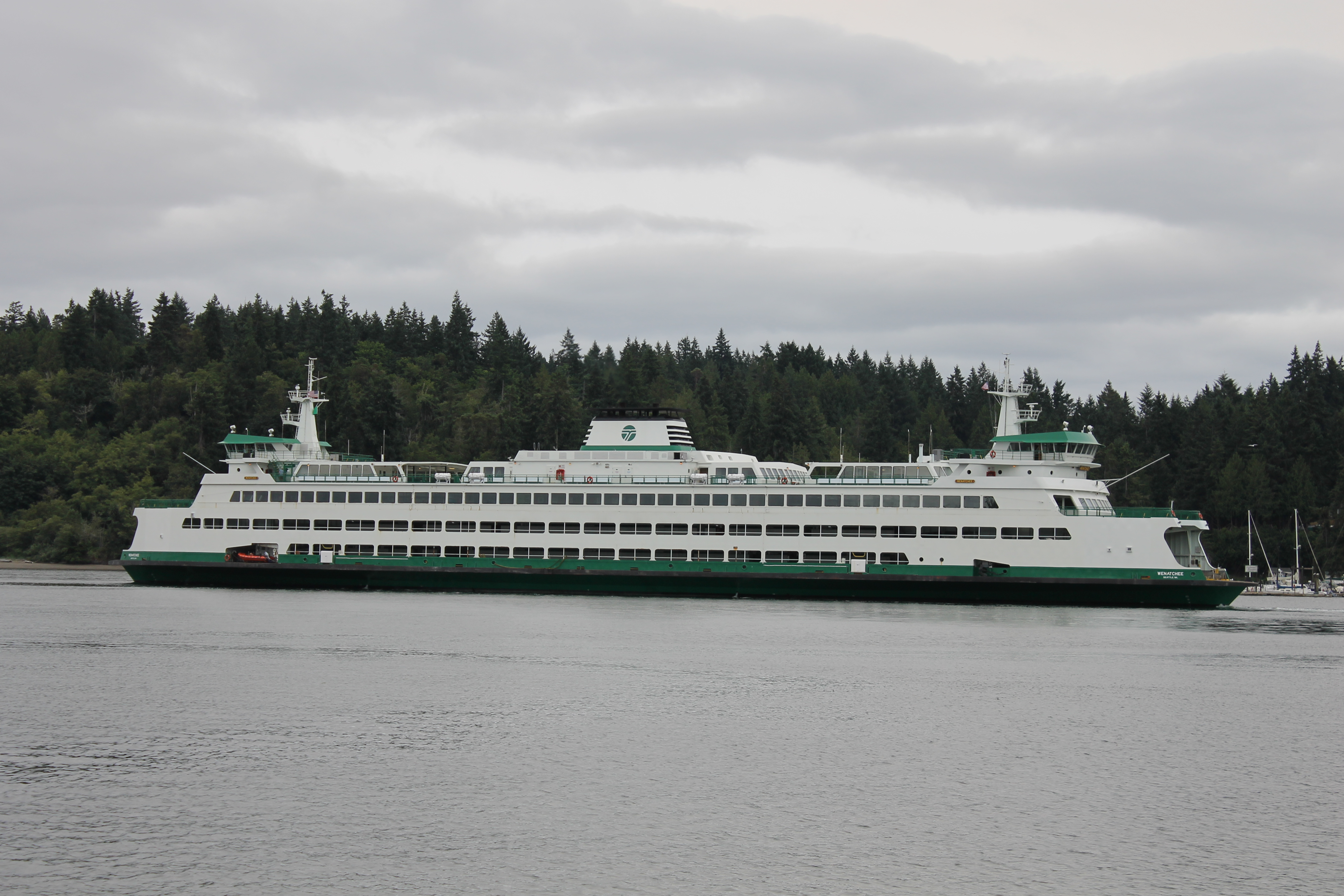
- MV Wenatchee departing Bainbridge maintenance facility in 2025

History
- Name: Wenatchee
- Owner: Washington State Department of Transportation
- Operator: Washington State Ferries
- Port of registry: Seattle, Washington
- Route: Seattle–Bainbridge Island
- Builder: Todd Pacific Shipyards, Seattle, Washington
- Cost: $80 million
- Completed: 1998
- Identification: IMO number: 9137351; MMSI number: 366749710; Callsign: WCY3378
- Status: In Service

General characteristics
- Class & type: Jumbo Mark-II-class auto/passenger ferry
- Displacement: 6,184 long tons (6,283 t)
- Length: 460 ft 2 in (140.3 m)
- Beam: 90 ft (27.4 m)
- Draft: 17 ft 3 in (5.3 m)
- Decks: 5 (2 vehicle decks, passenger deck, sun deck, nav bridge deck)
- Deck clearance: 15 ft 6 in (4.7 m)
- Installed power: 16,000 hp (12,000 kW) total from two EMD 710 V-16 diesel engine GenSets
- Propulsion: Diesel–electric hybrid
- Speed: 18 knots (33 km/h; 21 mph) (service, using two engines); 25 knots (46 km/h; 29 mph) (maximum, using four engines)
- Capacity: 2,499 passengers; 202 vehicles (max 60 tall vehicles)

MV Wenatchee is a Jumbo Mark-II-class ferry operated by Washington State Ferries. Launched in 1998, she was the second in her class in the fleet following the MV Tacoma. Since delivery, the Wenatchee has almost exclusively been assigned to the busy Seattle–Bainbridge Island route alongside the Tacoma.

MV Wenatchee docking at Colman Dock in Seattle

The Wenatchee and her older sister ship, the Tacoma, suffered from excessive vibration during their early period of operation, until she was repaired during routine maintenance in 1999. The issue was addressed in the final Jumbo Mark-II ferry, the MV Puyallup, before she launched.

The Jumbo Mark-II fleet is planned to be converted to diesel-electric hybrid beginning in 2023. The conversion was part of a state-mandated reduction in greenhouse gas emissions and was funded by part of a settlement from the Volkswagen emissions scandal. The Wenatchee is the first of the fleet to undergo conversion, which began in September 2023 and was scheduled to take one year to complete. Due to differences between the blueprints and the boat's condition, as well as other issues, the conversion's completion was delayed to mid-2025.

In April 2021, during sea trials following engine overhauls, the vessel suffered an engine fire and lost power, which led to an ongoing investigation by the United States Coast Guard and the National Transportation Safety Board.

The conversion to a hybrid system was completed in July 2025 at a total cost of $133 million. She returned to service on the Bainbridge Island–Seattle route on July 18, becoming the first hybrid electric vessel to enter the Washington State Ferries fleet. A month later, the Wenatchee was removed from service after two of its four drive motors temporarily went offline on arrival at Colman Dock in Seattle, creating a momentary power outage. She was moved to WSF's Eagle Harbor maintenance facility and was found to have issues with the control system's communication wires that caused intermittent stability.

== Incidents ==
In 2000, during a particularly low tide, she touched bottom while rounding Tyee Shoal at the entrance of Bainbridge Island's Eagle Harbor, resulting in minor keel and propeller damage. On August 30, 2009, she had a collision with the slip at Colman Dock in Seattle. There was heavy fog at the time and the vessel and slip were out of service for four days.
