= Lofall, Washington =

- Census-designated place
- Location within Washington (state) Location within the United States
- Coordinates: 47°48′41″N 122°39′23″W
- Country: United States
- State: Washington
- County: Kitsap

Area
  - Total: 2.00 sq mi (5.18 km^{2})
  - Land: 2.00 sq mi (5.18 km^{2})
  - Water: 0 sq mi (0.0 km^{2})
- Elevation: 344 ft (105 m)

Population (2020)
  - Total: 2,211
  - Density: 1,110/sq mi (427/km^{2})
- Time zone: Pacific
- ZIP Code: 98370
- Area code(s): 360, 564
- FIPS code: 53-39930
- GNIS feature ID: 2584998

Lofall is an unincorporated community and census-designated place (CDP) located in Kitsap County, Washington, United States. As of the 2020 census, Lofall had a population of 2,211.

A post office called Lofall was established in 1912, and remained in operation until 1934. The post office was named after H. Lofall, the original owner of the land where the post office was.

To its east lies Breidablick.

== Geography ==
Lofall is located in northern Kitsap County on the southeast side of Hood Canal, across which is South Point in Jefferson County. Lofall is bordered to the east by Washington State Route 3, which leads northeast 4 miles (6 km) to Port Gamble and south 19 miles (31 km) to Bremerton.

According to the U.S. Census Bureau, the Lofall CDP has an area of 2.0 square miles (5.2 km^{2}), of which 0.04 acres (179 m^{2}), or 0.003%, are water.

== Demographics ==
Historical population
Census	Pop.	Note	%±
2010	2,289		—
2020	2,211		−3.4%
U.S. Decennial Census; 2000 2010

Lofall first appeared as a census designated place in the 2010 U.S. census.

=== Racial and ethnic composition ===
Lofall CDP, Washington – Racial and ethnic composition Note: the US Census treats Hispanic/Latino as an ethnic category. This table excludes Latinos from the racial categories and assigns them to a separate category. Hispanics/Latinos may be of any race.
Race / Ethnicity (NH = Non-Hispanic)	Pop 2010	Pop 2020	% 2010	% 2020
White alone (NH)	2,046	1,845	89.38%	83.45%
Black or African American alone (NH)	26	27	1.14%	1.22%
Native American or Alaska Native alone (NH)	12	11	0.52%	0.50%
Asian alone (NH)	28	35	1.22%	1.58%
Native Hawaiian or Pacific Islander alone (NH)	5	3	0.22%	0.14%
Other race alone (NH)	0	24	0.00%	1.09%
Mixed race or Multiracial (NH)	79	134	3.45%	6.06%
Hispanic or Latino (any race)	93	132	4.06%	5.97%
Total	2,289	2,211	100.00%	100.00%

=== 2010 census ===
In 2010, the CDP had a population of 2,289 inhabitants. 1,202 were male, and 1,087 were female.
