= MV Puyallup =

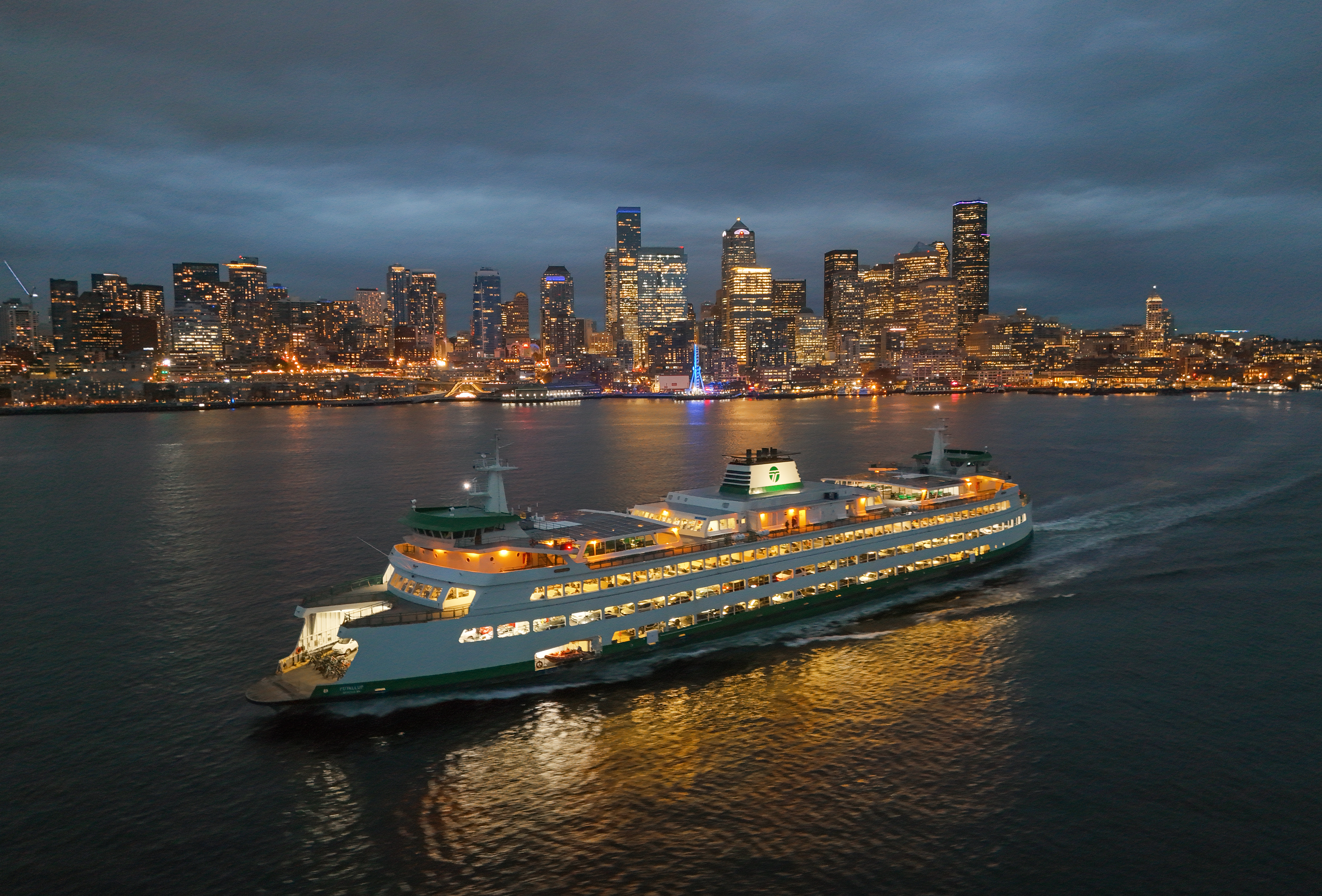
- Puyallup departing Colman Dock in Downtown Seattle

History
- Name: Puyallup
- Owner: Washington State Department of Transportation
- Operator: Washington State Ferries
- Port of registry: Seattle, Washington
- Route: Edmonds–Kingston ferry
- Builder: Todd Pacific Shipyards, Seattle, Washington
- Completed: 1999
- In service: 1999
- Identification: IMO number: 9137363; MMSI number: 366759130; Callsign: WCY7938
- Status: In service

General characteristics
- Class & type: Jumbo Mark-II-class auto/passenger ferry
- Displacement: 6,184 long tons (6,283 t)
- Length: 460 ft 2 in (140.3 m)
- Beam: 90 ft (27.4 m)
- Draft: 17 ft 3 in (5.3 m)
- Decks: 5 (2 vehicle decks, passenger deck, sun deck, nav bridge deck)
- Deck clearance: 15 ft 6 in (4.7 m)
- Installed power: 16,000 hp (12,000 kW) total from four EMD 710 V-16 diesel engines
- Propulsion: Diesel–electric
- Speed: 18 knots (33 km/h; 21 mph) (service, using two engines); 25 knots (46 km/h; 29 mph) (maximum, using four engines)
- Capacity: 2,499 passengers; 202 vehicles (max 60 tall vehicles)

MV Puyallup is a Jumbo Mark-II-class ferry operated by Washington State Ferries. This ferry and her two sisters are the largest in the fleet. Puyallup is normally assigned to the Edmonds–Kingston route, although she is often reassigned to the Seattle–Bainbridge Island route whenever either of her sisters assigned to that route are out of service.

In mid-2008, Puyallup was sent out of service for repainting and to have a new security system installed. She returned to service in January 2009. In the winter of 2013 she was hauled and her hull was stripped down to steel for a thorough inspection and scheduled maintenance. She was also fitted with new five-bladed propellers as an experiment to reduce vibration and increase efficiency.

== Incidents ==
There have been a few incidents in which passengers aboard Puyallup have disappeared. On April 15, 2001, a man disappeared while en route from Seattle to Bainbridge Island. Authorities suspected he fell overboard when the ship turned to enter Eagle Harbor while he was sitting on a railing. On January 13, 2009, a woman disappeared while the ferry was en route from Seattle to Bainbridge Island. Her husband found what he believed to be a suicide note.
