= Jumbo Mark-II-class ferry =

Auto/passenger ferries operated by Washington State

- MV Tacoma off Colman Dock, Seattle

Class overview
- Builders: Todd Pacific Shipyards, Seattle, Washington
- Operators: Washington State Ferries
- Preceded by: Jumbo class
- Built: 1997–1999
- In service: 1997–present
- Completed: 3
- Active: 2
- Laid up: 1

General characteristics
- Type: Auto/passenger ferry
- Tonnage: 4,936 tons
- Displacement: 6,184 long tons (6,283 t)
- Length: 460 ft 2 in (140.3 m)
- Beam: 90 ft (27.4 m)
- Draft: 17 ft 3 in (5.3 m)
- Decks: 5 (2 vehicle decks, passenger deck, sun deck, nav bridge deck)
- Deck clearance: 15 ft 6 in (4.7 m)
- Installed power: 16,000 hp (11,931.2 kW) total from four EMD 710 V-16 diesel engines
- Propulsion: Diesel–electric
- Speed: 18 knots (33 km/h; 21 mph) (service, using two engines); 25 knots (46 km/h; 29 mph) (maximum, using four engines)
- Capacity: 2,499 passengers; 202 vehicles (max 60 tall vehicles)

The Jumbo Mark II-class ferries are a series of ferries built for Washington State Ferries (WSF) between 1997 and 1999, at Todd Pacific Shipyards in Seattle. Each ferry can carry up to 2,500 passengers and 202 vehicles, making them the largest ferries in the fleet, and the second longest double-ended ferries in the world. They all have full galley service and a "quiet room" upstairs.

Ferries in this class include:

- Puyallup
- Tacoma
- Wenatchee

In 2018, WSF announced plans to convert the Jumbo Mark II-class to battery electric propulsion by switching two of the four engines in each ferry with batteries. Funding for the program was earmarked the following year, with the Wenatchee planned to be the first ferry to undergo conversion. The $150 million contract was awarded to Vigor Industrial in August 2023; Wenatchee is planned to be taken out of service for a year beginning in September 2023.
