= MV Hyak =

Retired ferryboat

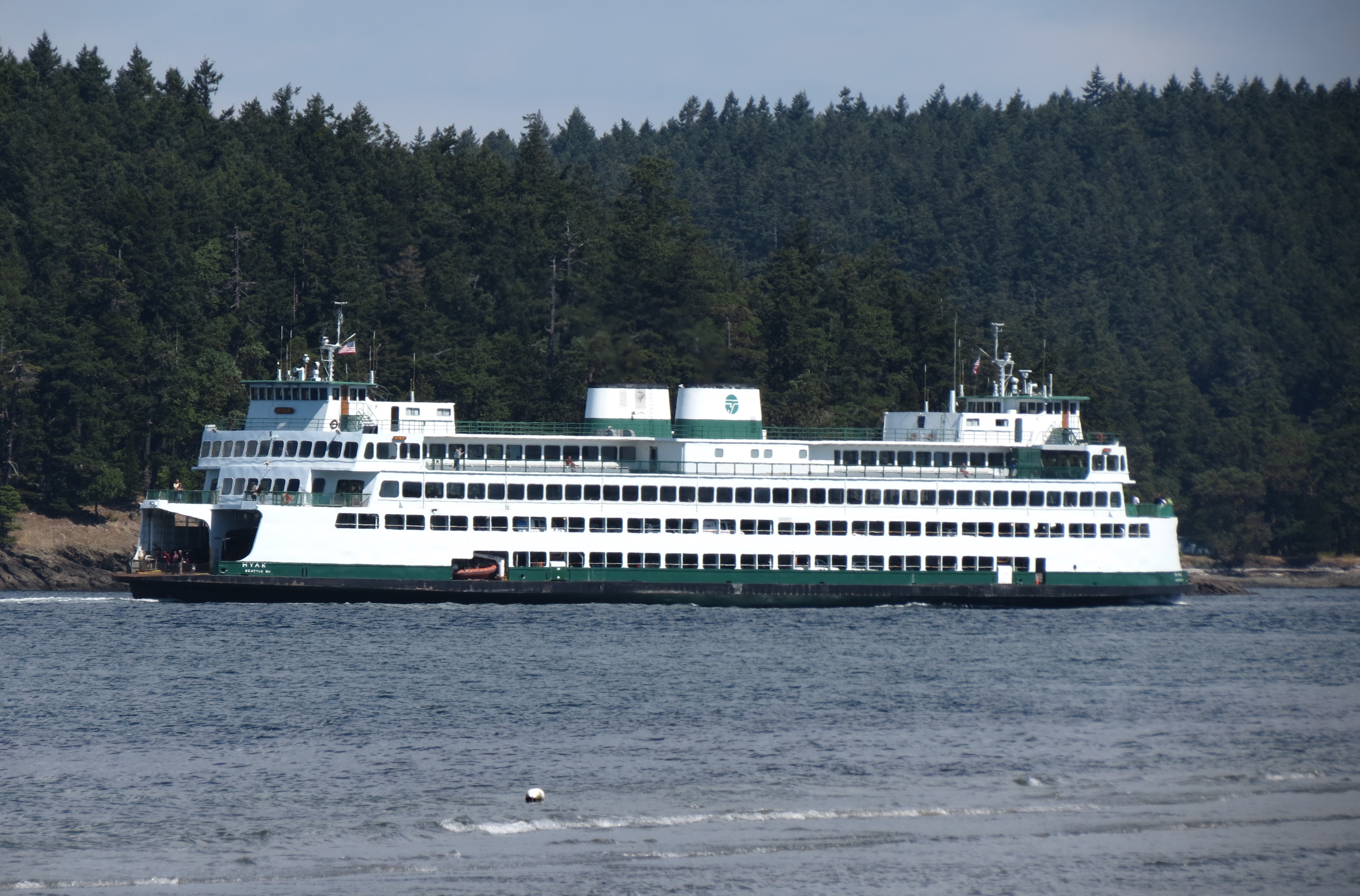
- The MV Hyak in Upright Channel, in between Lopez Island and Shaw Island

History
- Name: Hyak
- Owner: WSDOT
- Operator: Washington State Ferries
- Port of registry: Seattle, Washington, (United States)
- Route: Relief vessel
- Ordered: 1966
- Builder: National Steel and Shipbuilding Company shipyard, San Diego, California
- Cost: $6,500,000
- Laid down: 1966
- Launched: December 17, 1966
- Christened: December 17, 1966
- Completed: 1967
- Acquired: July 4, 1967
- Maiden voyage: July 19, 1967
- In service: July 20, 1967
- Out of service: June 30, 2019
- Identification: IMO number: 8835334; MMSI number: 366773030; Callsign: WX9439
- Status: Retired

General characteristics
- Class & type: Super-class auto/passenger ferry
- Tonnage: 2,704 GT; 1,214 NT
- Displacement: 3,634 long tons (3,692 t)
- Length: 382 ft 2 in (116.5 m)
- Beam: 73 ft 2 in (22.3 m)
- Draft: 18 ft 6 in (5.6 m)
- Decks: 5
- Deck clearance: 15 ft 6 in (4.7 m)
- Installed power: Total 8,000 hp (6,000 kW) from 4 x diesel-electric engines
- Propulsion: Diesel-electric (DC)
- Speed: 17 knots (31 km/h; 20 mph)
- Capacity: 2,500 passengers; 160 vehicles (max 30 commercial)

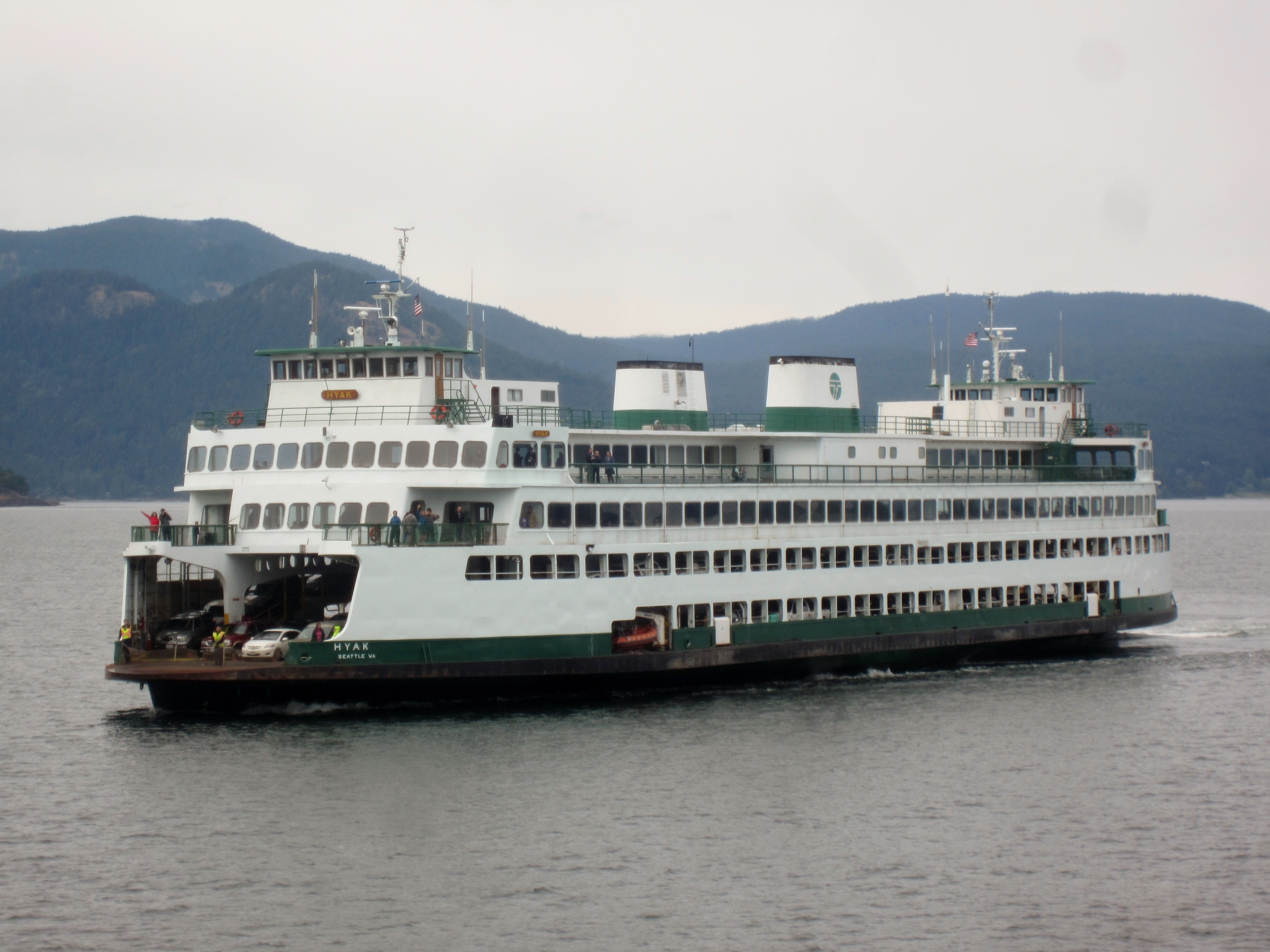
Hyak seen approaching Lopez Island from the MV Samish.

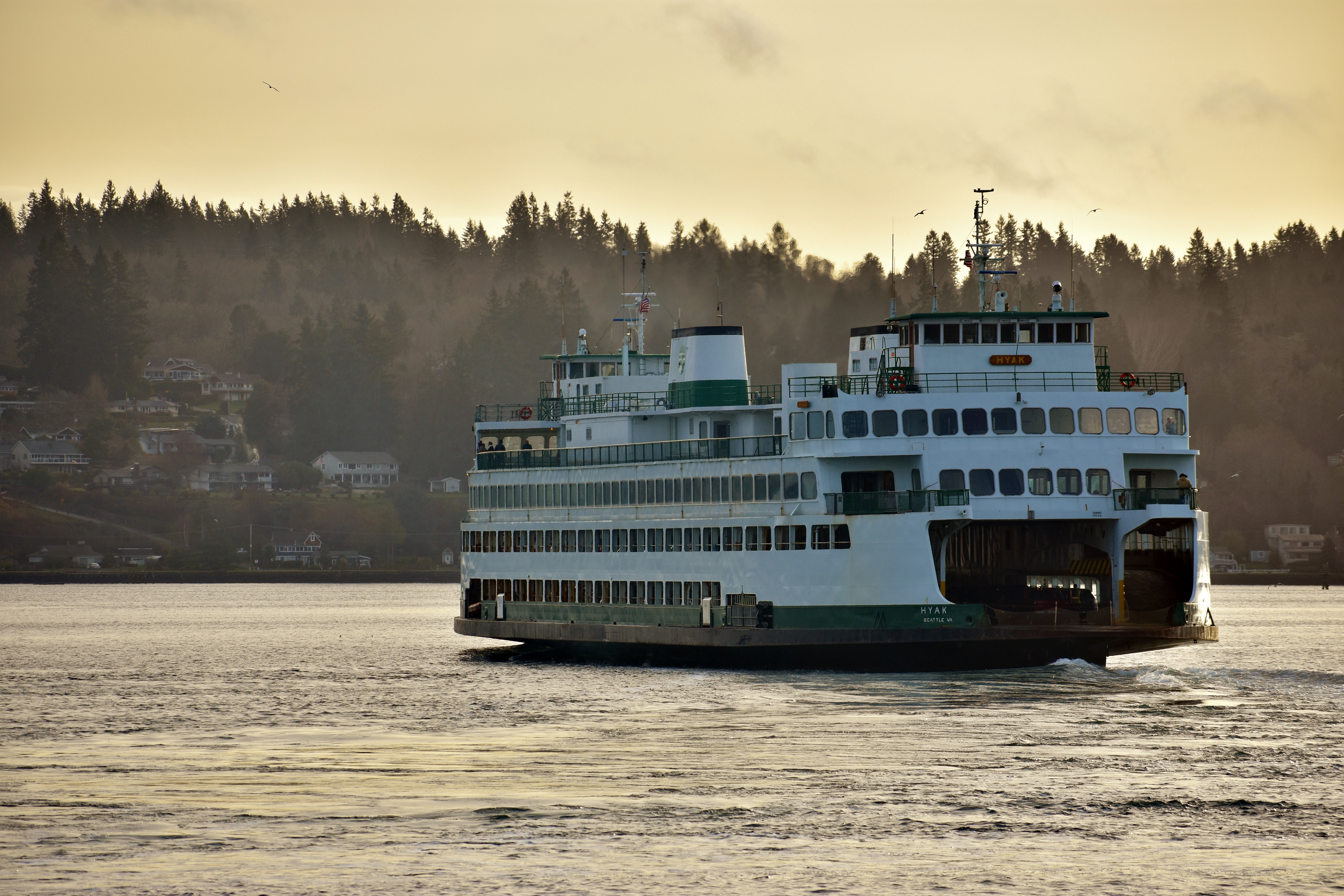
The Hyak departs Bremerton with her 9:45 AM sailing to Seattle.

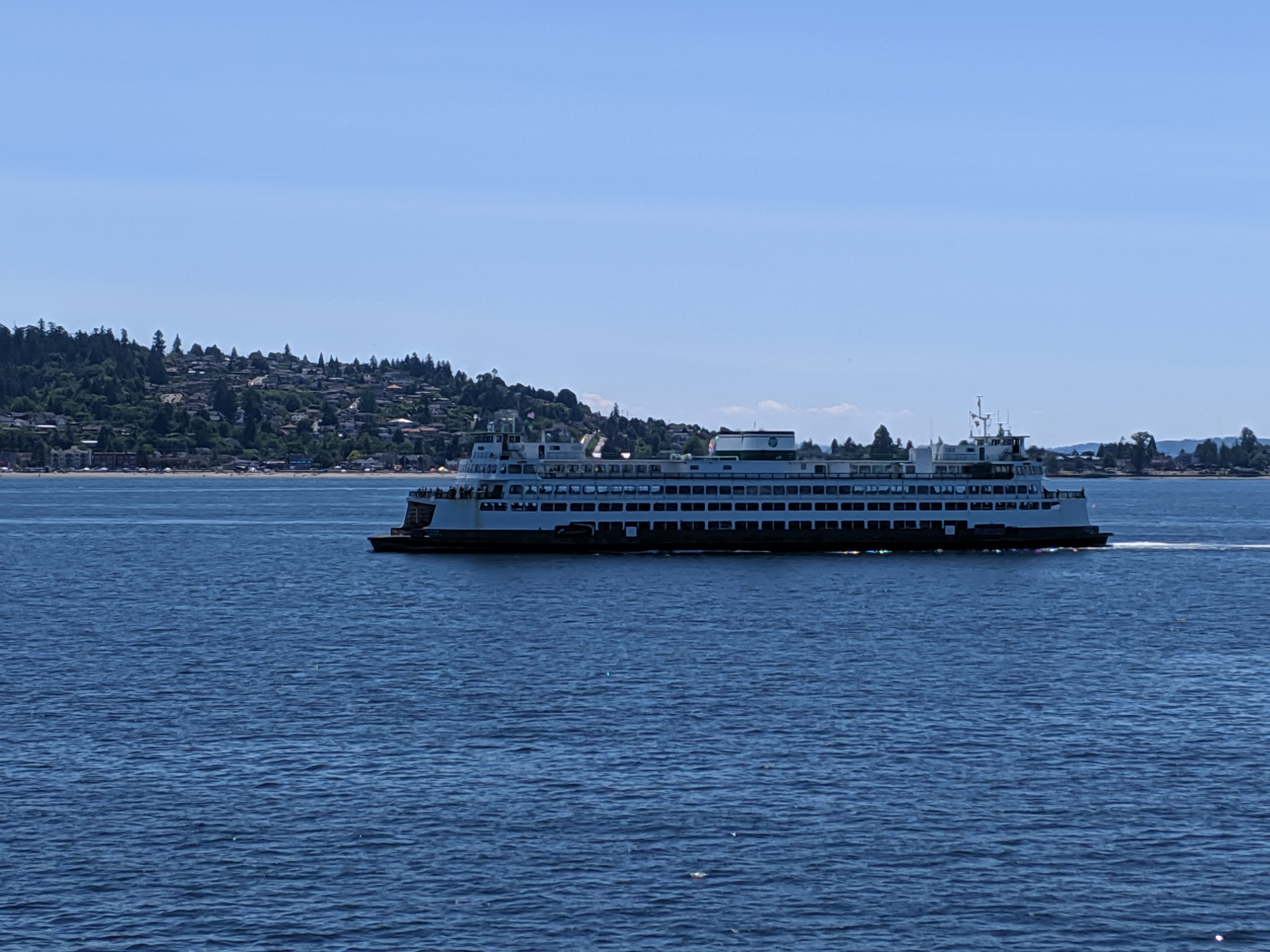
The Hyak seen passing Alki Point from the MV Tacoma on her final day of service

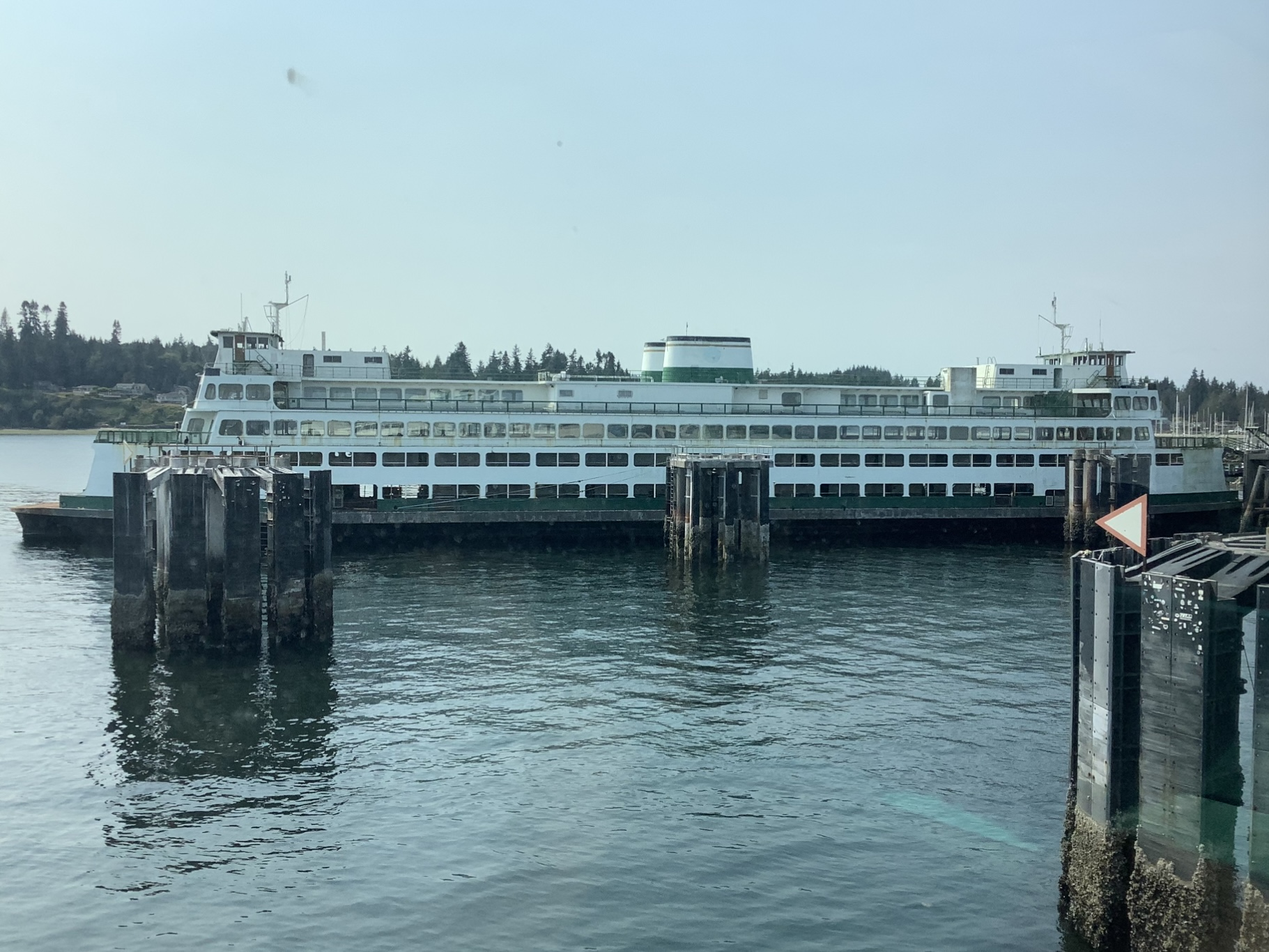
The retired Hyak docked in Kingston, pictured four years after final voyage, with clear aging

MV Hyak is a Super-class ferry that was operated by Washington State Ferries. Built in 1966 at the National Steel and Shipbuilding Company shipyard in San Diego, the ferry began service on July 20, 1967, and normally ran on the Seattle–Bremerton route or the Anacortes–San Juan Islands run.

Hyak is Chinook Jargon for "speedy".

== History ==
The Hyak was built by the National Steel and Shipbuilding Company of San Diego, California in 1966, at a cost of $6.5 million. It was launched and christened by Nancy Evans, wife of Governor Daniel J. Evans, on December 17, 1966. The vessel traveled north along the Pacific Coast in June 1967, but was delayed by a severe storm near San Francisco, California when it broke a temporary breakwater. She arrived in Seattle on July 4, several days later than scheduled, and was moved to the Todd Shipyards for repairs. The word Hyak is Chinook Jargon for "speedy".

The ferry was not able to enter service after arrival because of an ongoing labor dispute with the local chapter of the International Organization of Masters, Mates & Pilots. The union argued that the wage agreement it signed with Washington State Ferries did not cover new, larger vessels like the Hyak. The dispute reached the King County Superior Court, where a judge signed an injunction ordering the ferry to be crewed on its first run on July 19. The Hyak entered service that afternoon, and was assigned to the Seattle–Bremerton route, cutting the crossing time from 65 minutes to 45. The next day, the ferry made its first scheduled run and nearly rammed Pier 52 in Seattle after an engine failure. During the 1990s, she was on the Edmonds-Kingston route and she would fill in there and the Seattle-Bainbridge route during the last few years of her service life.

Unlike her sisters, the Hyak did not have her cabin refurbished. In June 2015, the Hyak was replaced by the MV Samish in the third sailing spot in the San Juans. It was moved to the Seattle–Bremerton route for the remainder of its life, but returned to the San Juan route several times to replace vessels undergoing maintenance. The Hyak primarily served as a standby vessel for the rest of the fleet and was considered for experimental conversion to use hybrid diesel-electric generators until the plan was scrapped in 2015. The retirement of the Hyak, originally anticipated for the arrival of MV Samish, was delayed into 2019 after MV Suquamish replaced it as a relief vessel.

The Hyak had a $37 million maintenance backlog that was left unaddressed by the state legislature, which allocated $2 million in supplemental funds to operate the ferry until June 2019. The supplemental funds were not extended in the 2019–21 transportation budget, signaling the vessel's retirement. On June 30, 2019, the Hyak made her final run on the Seattle–Bremerton route; the vessel's retirement caused schedule modifications on several routes to accommodate the downsized fleet. The Hyak will be stripped of her usable equipment and prepared for sale as surplus property.

=== Legacy ===
The vessel's horn was donated to Climate Pledge Arena, where it is used by the National Hockey League's Seattle Kraken every time they score a goal during home games. Four years later, the engine order telegraph was also salvaged for a new part of the pre-game show The Surge.

== Incidents ==
On April 19, 1977, the Hyak rammed the terminal slip at Seattle causing an estimated $500,000 worth of damage.

On April 14, 1986, the Hyak ran aground in Anacortes, Washington after a navigational error made by the crew, placing the ferry in shallow water above a reef. Only one injury was reported of the 250 people on board, but the ferry sustained damage that cost $250,000 to repair.

On September 13, 2013, the Hyak collided with a private 27-foot-long (8.2 m) sailboat between Orcas and Shaw islands. No one was injured. The sailboat, however, was damaged and sank about 20 minutes after the accident.
