= Sanpoil (disambiguation) =

The Sanpoil are a Native American people of the U.S. state of Washington.

Sanpoil may also refer to:

- Sanpoil River, a tributary of the Columbia River in Washington State
- M/V Sanpoil, the current Keller Ferry
