= Ferries in Washington (state) =

Overview of ferry transportation in the U.S. state of Washington

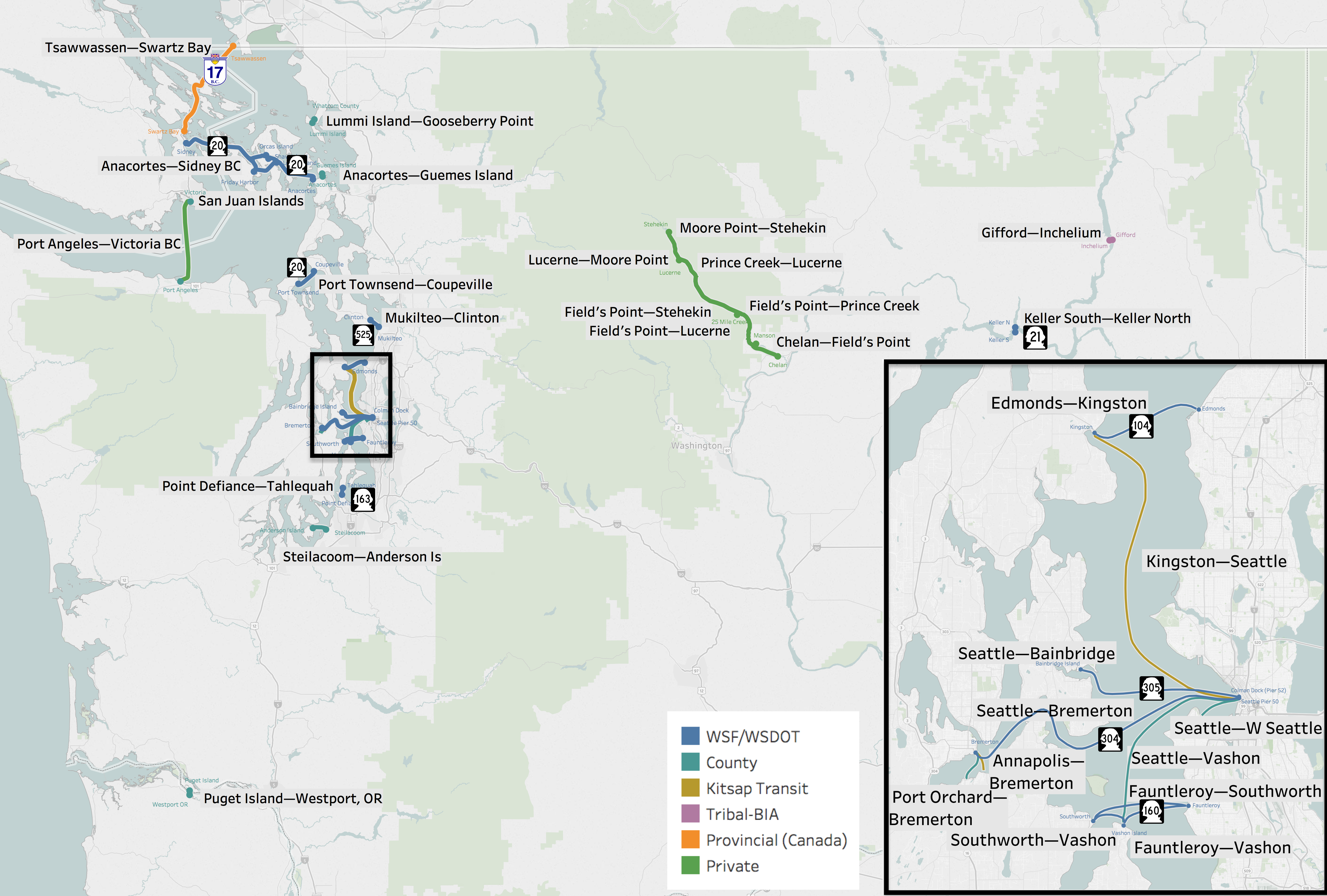
Ferry routes and terminals, with ownership shown by color.

The U.S. state of Washington is home to a number of public and private ferry systems, most notably the state-run Washington State Ferries.

== History ==
Due to Washington's geography which features large, deep bodies of water with many peninsulas and islands, ferries are a convenient means of connecting communities in the region. Most were operated by private companies until later acquisitions by governments, beginning with the state's takeover of the Keller Ferry on the Columbia River in 1930.

The Washington State Ferries system was created in 1951 from the state government's acquisition of a private firm. It operates large automobile ferries on Puget Sound and in the San Juan Islands. The agency also operated passenger ferries from 1986 to 2006, but was later prohibited from operating passenger-only routes. Other local operators, including the King County Water Taxi and Kitsap Fast Ferries, emerged in the 21st century to operate passenger-only routes. Several county governments operate their own ferry routes, with Kitsap Transit specifically authorized by the state legislature to run passenger ferries. An expansion of this authority was proposed by a legislator in 2025. The use of high-speed electric hydrofoils is under study for several systems in the Puget Sound regions.

== Washington State Ferries ==
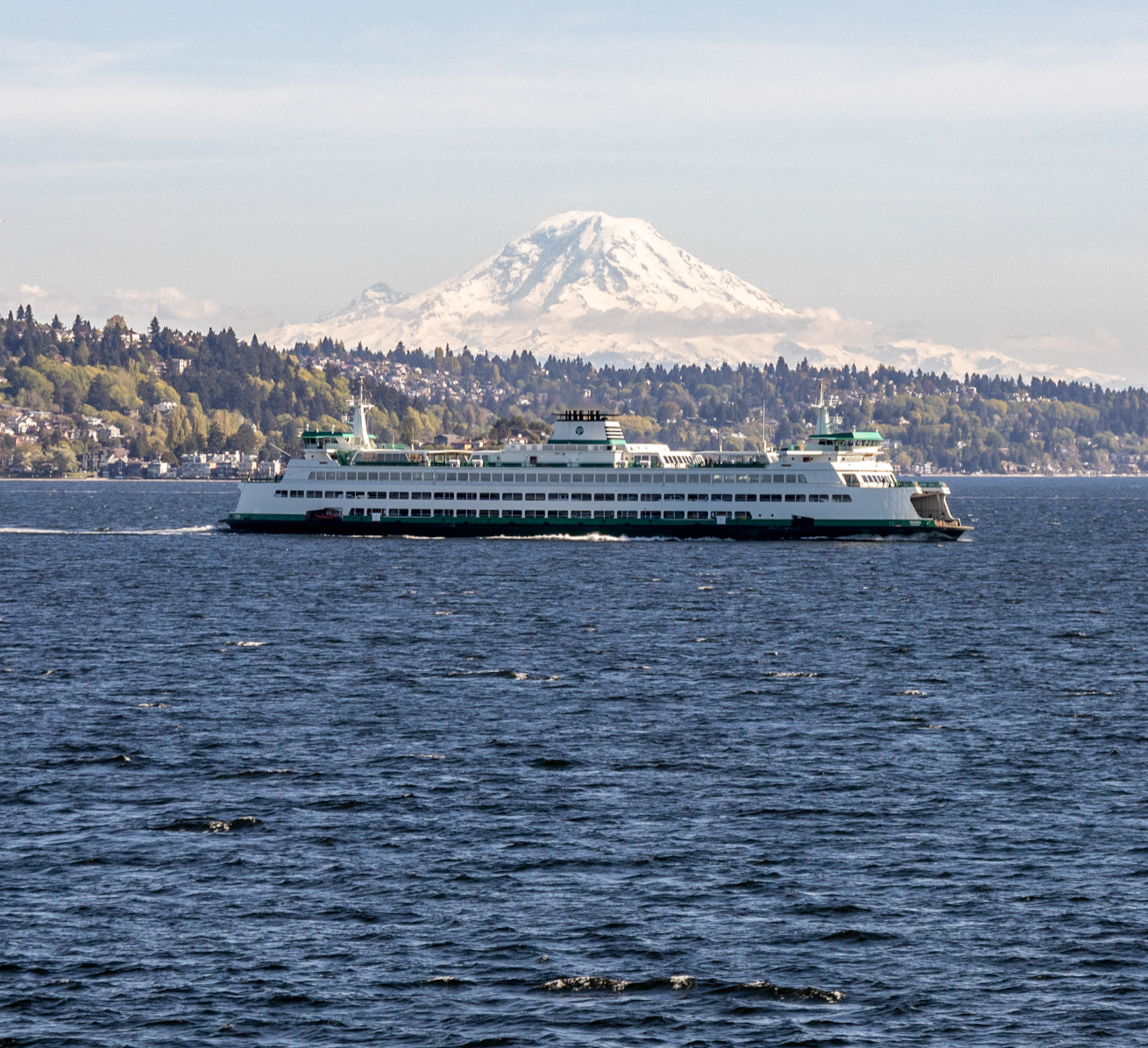
MV Tacoma on Puget Sound with Mount Rainier in the background

Washington State Ferries, owned and operated by the Washington State Department of Transportation (WSDOT), serves communities on Puget Sound and in the San Juan Islands. It is the largest fleet of passenger and automobile ferries in the United States and the third largest in the world.

=== WSDOT Ferries ===
Route name	Terminals				State route designation	Annual Ridership	Annual Vehicles Carried	Notes								
Route name	Terminals				State route designation	Annual Ridership	Annual Vehicles Carried	Notes	Anacortes–Sidney BC	Sidney, British Columbia	Friday Harbor, San Juan Island	Anacortes	SR 20 Spur	123,001	42,589	Route out of service due to vessel availability issues: Reservations Required; Only route that operates internationally; Route does not operate in Winter (open mid-March to mid-December)
Anacortes–San Juan Islands	Friday Harbor, San Juan Island			2,009,438	947,064	Reservations recommended; Not all trips serve all island terminals.						Anacortes	SR 20 Spur			
Anacortes–San Juan Islands	Lopez Island			2,009,438	947,064	Reservations recommended; Not all trips serve all island terminals.						Anacortes	SR 20 Spur			
Anacortes–San Juan Islands	Shaw Island			2,009,438	947,064	Reservations recommended; Not all trips serve all island terminals.						Anacortes	SR 20 Spur			
Anacortes–San Juan Islands	Orcas Island			2,009,438	947,064	Reservations recommended; Not all trips serve all island terminals.						Anacortes	SR 20 Spur			
Interisland	Friday Harbor, San Juan Island	Orcas Island	Shaw Island	2,009,438	947,064	Lopez Island	Walk-on passengers are not charged a fare on this route.						SR 20 Spur			
Port Townsend–Coupeville	Port Townsend			Coupeville, Whidbey Island	SR 20	819,285	372,130	Reservations recommended								
Mukilteo–Clinton	Clinton, Whidbey Island			Mukilteo	SR 525	4,073,761	2,234,650									
Edmonds–Kingston	Kingston			Edmonds	SR 104	4,114,181	2,127,315									
Seattle–Bainbridge Island	Winslow, Bainbridge Island			Seattle (Colman Dock)	SR 305	6,429,853	1,929,617									
Seattle–Bremerton	Bremerton			Seattle (Colman Dock)	SR 304	2,739,926	673,815									
Fauntleroy–Vashon	Vashon Island			West Seattle (Fauntleroy)	SR 160	3,059,587	1,738,721	All three services operated together as a "triangle route."								
Fauntleroy–Southworth	Southworth			West Seattle (Fauntleroy)	SR 160	3,059,587	1,738,721	All three services operated together as a "triangle route."								
Southworth–Vashon	Southworth			Vashon Island	SR 160	200,672	109,548	All three services operated together as a "triangle route."								
Point Defiance–Tahlequah	Tahlequah, Vashon Island			Tacoma (Point Defiance)	SR 163	812,786	473,924									

== Other ferries in Washington ==
=== Publicly operated ===
- The Keller Ferry carries State Route 21 across Lake Roosevelt on the upper Columbia River between the Colville Indian Reservation and Clark. It is operated by WSDOT and was the first ferry operated by the state of Washington.
- The Guemes Island ferry from Anacortes 5 minutes north to Guemes Island is operated by Skagit County, Washington.
- Wahkiakum County operates the Wahkiakum County Ferry between Puget Island, Washington and Westport, Oregon on the lower Columbia River.
- The Colville Confederated Tribes operates the M/V Columbia Princess a.k.a. the Gifford-Inchelium Ferry on the upper Columbia River.
- Pierce County operates the Steilacoom-Anderson Island Ferry providing service between Steilacoom, Anderson Island and Ketron Island, using two vessels, the Christine Anderson and the Steilacoom II.
- The Washington State Department of Corrections also operates a ferry from the same dock to the McNeil Island Corrections Center.
- The Lummi Island Ferry, also known as the M/V Whatcom Chief, from Gooseberry Point to Lummi Island is operated by Whatcom County.

=== Private ===
Many private ferries exist to serve residents of islands throughout Puget Sound and beyond into the Strait of Juan de Fuca. For example:

- High-speed catamarans, geared to tourists, run from Seattle to Victoria, British Columbia, and are operated by Victoria Clipper.
- Black Ball Transport operates the M/V Coho auto/passenger ferry between Port Angeles and Victoria.
- The M/V Charlie Wells crosses Case Inlet from the Key Peninsula (south of Vaughn, Washington) to Herron Island, a privately owned and operated island.
- Hat Express operates Thursday to Sunday between the Everett Marina and Gedney (Hat) Island Marina.

=== Passenger-only ===
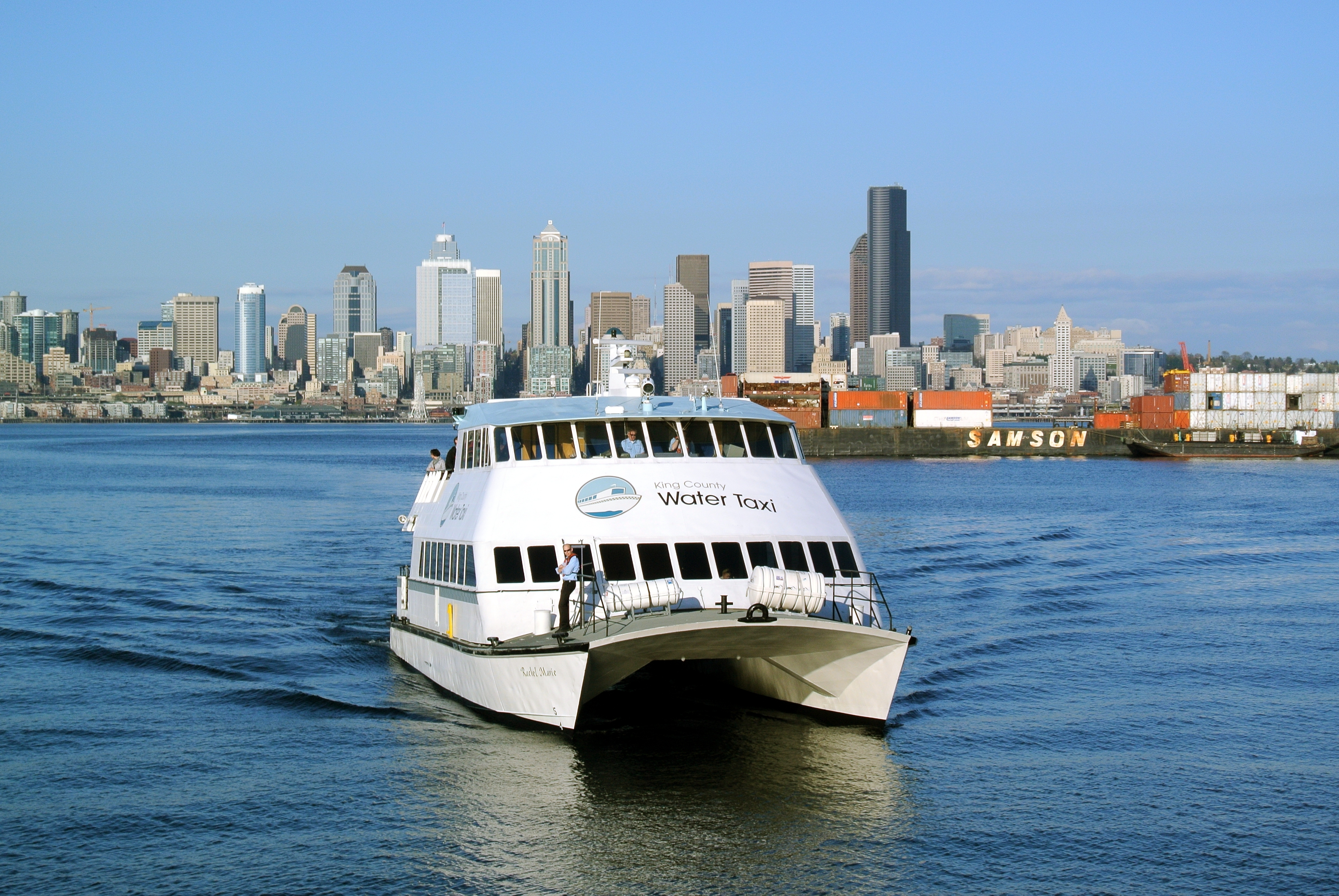
King County Water Taxi and Downtown Seattle

- The King County Department of Transportation operates two passenger-only ferry services known as the King County Water Taxi with service from Downtown Seattle to Vashon Island and West Seattle.
- Kitsap Transit operates passenger-only ferries between Port Orchard and Bremerton, and Annapolis and Bremerton. It also operates Kitsap Fast Ferries from Seattle to Bremerton, Kingston, and Southworth.
- The small Jetty Island Ferry runs the short distance between the Everett Marina and the man made, unpopulated Jetty Island in the summer months for tourists.
- The Lady of the Lake ferry runs year-round from Chelan to Stehekin on Lake Chelan.
- Drayton Harbor Maritime operates MV Plover between Blaine and Semiahmoo Resort during summer months.

=== Defunct ===
- From 2004 to April 2007, a private company, the Kitsap Ferry Co., provided passenger-only ferry service between Bremerton and Seattle, during weekday commute times. The service was canceled due to high costs and lack of support from Kitsap Transit, whose district voters failed to pass a sales tax increase for the foot ferry.
- The most recent run between Kingston and Seattle, called Aqua Express, shut down after two years of unprofitable service. Port of Kingston's SoundRunner service operated Spirit of Kingston between Kingston and downtown Seattle, but it too has ceased operations and the Spirit of Kingston has been purchased by the King County Ferry District. West Seattle to the Seattle central business district and Bremerton to Seattle have been other passenger-only routes attempted by private enterprise.
- The M/V El Matador crossed the channel of Grays Harbor, from Ocean Shores to Westport during summer months. It was discontinued in 2008 due to the fact that the Ocean Shores Marina has not been dredged, and the vessel is unable to enter without having problems.
- Vessels geared to tourists ran from Port Angeles to Victoria, British Columbia, and were operated by Victoria Express until it ended its passenger service in 2010.
- Puget Sound Express was contracted to run MV Chilkat Express from Downtown Seattle to Des Moines as part of a two-month pilot. It began service on August 10, 2022, and was scheduled to end on October 9.
