= Super-class ferry =

Auto/passenger ferries operated by Washington State

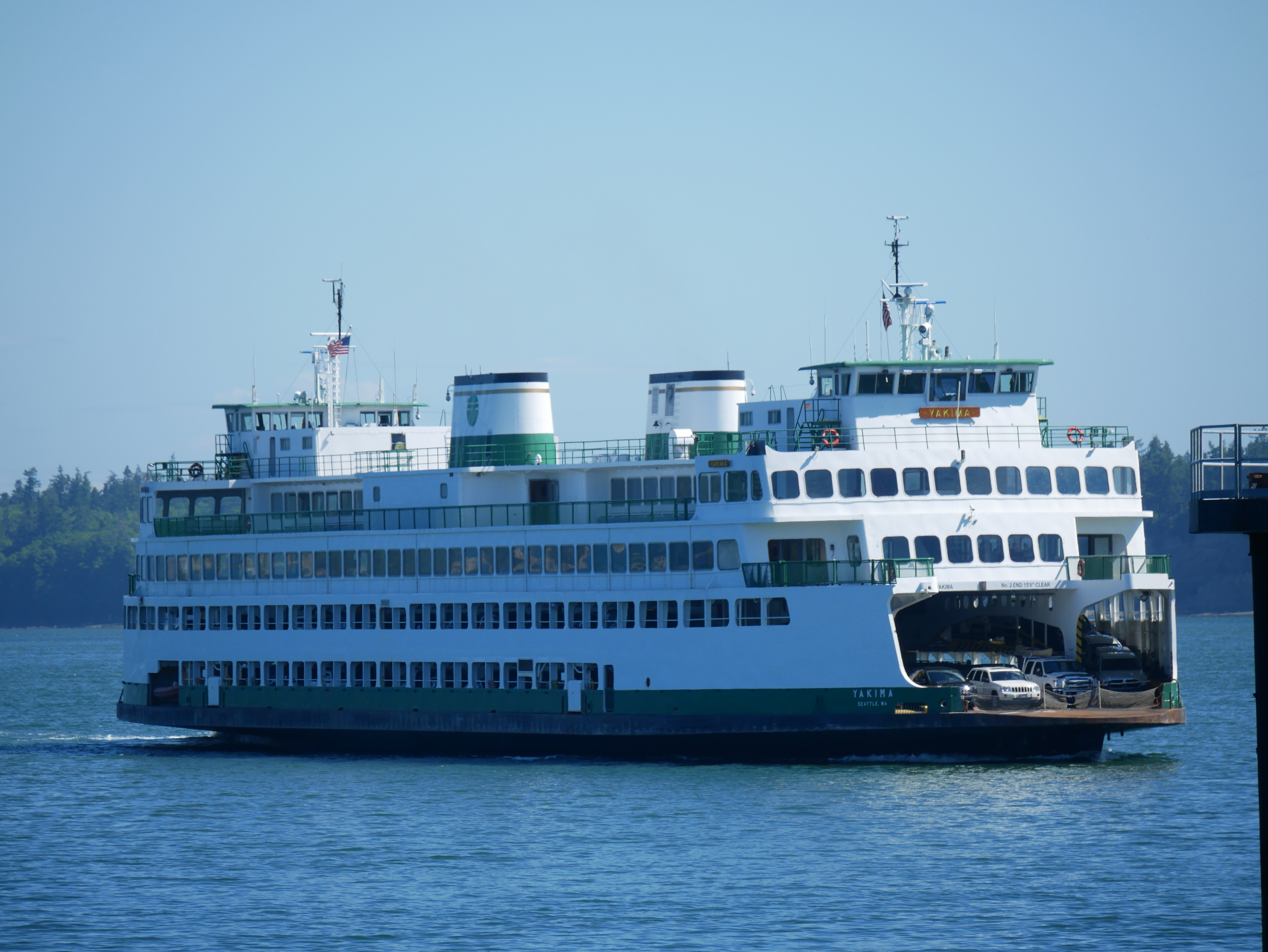
- The Yakima arrives at the Anacortes ferry terminal, June 2018

Class overview
- Builders: National Steel and Shipbuilding Company, San Diego, California
- Operators: Washington State Ferries
- Succeeded by: Jumbo class; Olympic class
- Built: 1967–1968
- In service: 1967–present
- Planned: 4
- Completed: 4
- Active: 2
- Retired: 2

General characteristics
- Class & type: Auto/passenger ferry
- Tonnage: 2,704 gross tonnage (GT); 1,214 net tonnage (NT)
- Displacement: 3,634 long tons (3,692 t)
- Length: 382 ft 2 in (116.5 m)
- Beam: 73 ft 2 in (22.3 m)
- Draft: 18 ft 6 in (5.6 m)
- Decks: 2 auto decks/2 passenger decks
- Deck clearance: 14 ft 5 in (4.4 m)
- Installed power: 8,000 hp (6,000 kW) total from four diesel engines
- Propulsion: Diesel–electric
- Speed: Top: 20 knots (37 km/h; 23 mph); Operating: 17 knots (31 km/h; 20 mph)
- Capacity: 1,800 passengers (originally 2,500); 144 vehicles (originally 160; maximum commercial vehicles 30)

The Super-class ferries are a class of 382-foot (116 m), 144-car ferries built in 1967 for Washington State Ferries.

== History ==
The Super-class ferry was designed to complement the smaller Evergreen State-class ferries, as well as to replace the aging Kalakala. The design of the Super class was done in Seattle by W.C. Nickum and Sons, a naval architectural firm, and Washington State Ferries. Funding for the Super-class ferry design and construction was made available by the United States Department of Housing and Urban Development (HUD), and state and federal funds. Once the design was complete, a low bid was accepted by the National Steel and Shipbuilding Company in San Diego, California, which constructed all four vessels over a period of two years.

The Super class was to designed to accommodate the rapidly expanding population growth in Puget Sound, especially in the Bremerton and Bainbridge Island areas. Each vessel was rated with a 20-knot (37 km/h; 23 mph) top speed, which was relatively unheard of in large ferries at the time. All four vessels in the class feature a two-level passenger deck and a vast sun deck with full access via sheltered outdoor stairwells at both ends of the vessel, indoor staircases via both passenger decks, and elevators which were later added to meet ADA requirements.

The first ferry to enter service, in 1967, was the Hyak, which replaced the Kalakala on the Seattle–Bremerton route. The 20-knot speed enabled the 16-mile (26 km) crossing to be made in 45 minutes, as opposed to an hour and fifteen minutes on the Kalakala which traveled at a maximum of 12 knots (22 km/h; 14 mph). Second to enter service was the Kaleetan in 1968, on the Seattle–Bainbridge Island route. The last two were the Yakima (Seattle–Bremerton) and Elwha (Seattle–Bainbridge Island), which entered service later that year.

The Super class was displaced on the Seattle–Bainbridge route less than five years later by the even larger Jumbo-class ferries. Starting in 2019, the Super class was replaced by the Olympic-class ferries.

== Ferries ==
The Super class consisted of four vessels. As of September 2021, two of those vessels are still in active service, and the other two have been retired.

The class consists of:

- Hyak – retired June 30, 2019
- Kaleetan – in active service as of September 2021
- Yakima – in active service as of September 2021
- Elwha – retired April 17, 2020
