= MV Elwha =

1968 Super-class ferry

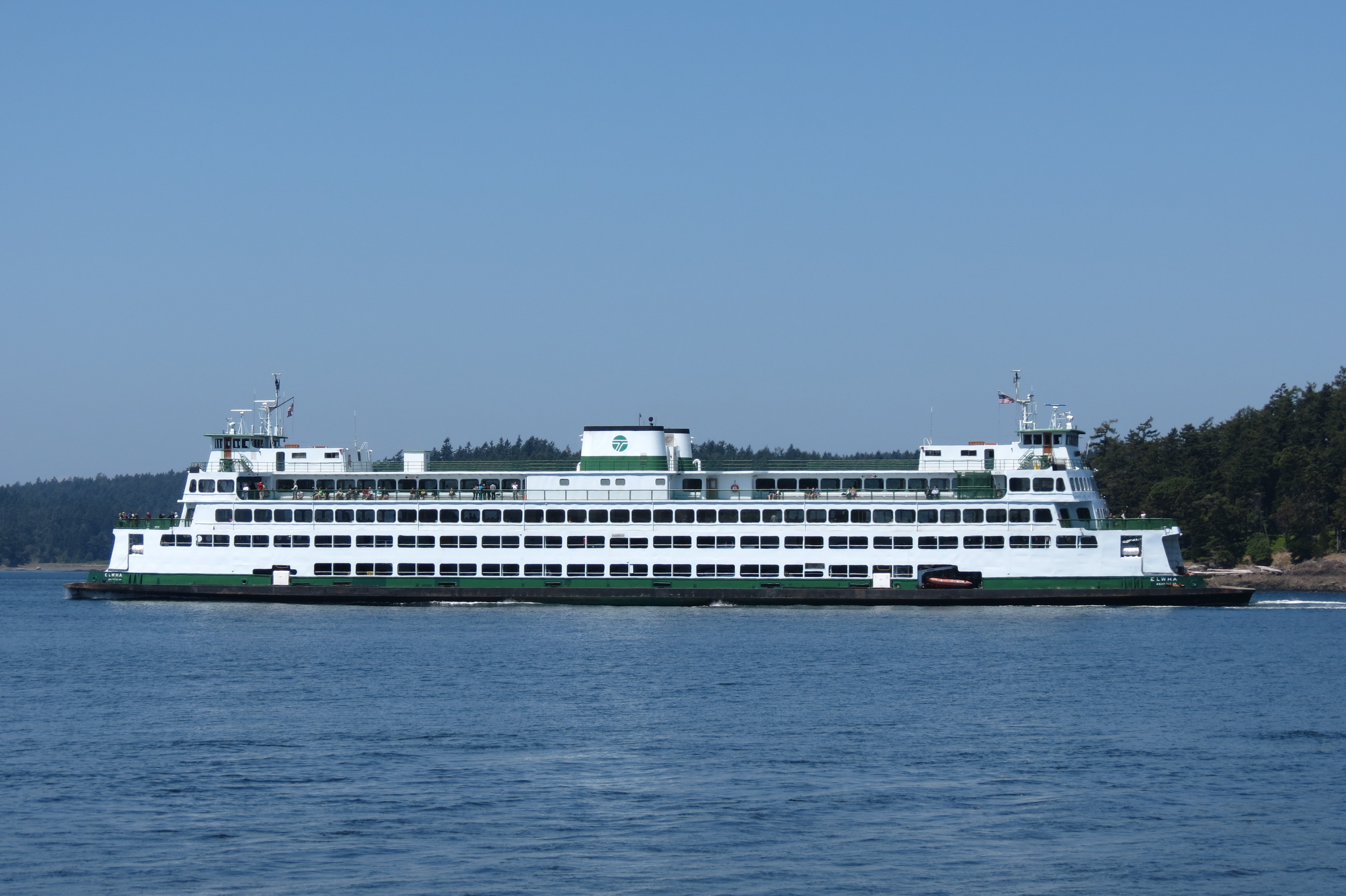
- The MV Elwha passing Flat Point between Lopez Island and Canoe Island

History
- Owner: WSDOT
- Operator: Washington State Ferries
- Port of registry: Seattle, Washington, United States
- Launched: December 16, 1967
- Christened: December 16, 1967
- Completed: 1967, rebuilt in 1991
- Maiden voyage: June 16, 1968
- Out of service: April 17, 2020
- Identification: IMO number: 8835358; MMSI number: 366773060; Callsign: WY3960
- Status: Retired

General characteristics
- Class & type: Super-class ferry
- Tonnage: 2,813 GT; 1,322 NT
- Displacement: 3,978 long tons (4,042 t)
- Length: 382 ft 2 in (116.5 m)
- Beam: 73 ft 2 in (22.3 m)
- Draft: 18 ft 9 in (5.7 m)
- Decks: 2 auto decks/2 passenger decks
- Deck clearance: 15 ft (4.6 m)
- Installed power: Total 10,200 hp (7,600 kW) from 4 × diesel-electric engines
- Speed: 20 knots (37 km/h; 23 mph)
- Capacity: 2,000 passengers; 144 vehicles (max 30 commercial) - On the international route, SOLAS passenger capacity is 1090 people.
- Crew: 14

MV Elwha was a Super-class ferry in the Washington State Ferry System. The 382-foot (116 m) vessel entered service in June 1968, and spent most of her career working the Anacortes-San Juan Islands-Sidney B.C. route. Elwha was retired in 2020 and set to be scrapped in 2024 until the sale to an Ecuadorian firm was cancelled amid contract issues. She was instead sold in 2025 to a local company to be converted into a floating office and warehouse.

== History ==
Elwha was built in 1967 in San Diego, California, as the last of the four Super-class ferries. She made her maiden voyage on June 16, 1968 on the Seattle-Bainbridge Island route, and remained on the route for the first four years of her career before being replaced in fall 1972 by the Walla Walla.

For much of the 1970s, the Elwha served as a maintenance relief vessel, filling in for other Super and Jumbo-class ferries when and where needed for maintenance cycles.

In the 1980s, Elwha was assigned to the Anacortes-San Juan Islands route, where she stayed, with rare exception, until her retirement in 2020.

=== Incidents ===
On October 2, 1983, the Elwha ran aground in Grindstone Harbor, near Orcas Island, on a submerged reef while carrying 100 passengers. The collision was initially blamed on the failure of a steering component, but was later found to have been caused by Captain Billy Fittro going off-course to give a visitor a view of her waterfront home. The captain resigned in lieu of being discharged a few days after the incident; ferry chief Nick Tracey was fired the following month, after failing to report Captain Fittro's past negligence. The collision caused $250,000 in damage and forced the ferry out of service for several weeks. The rock was later named "Elwha Rock" in 1989 after the ferry; the incident also inspired the song "Elwha on the Rocks", recorded by the Island City Jazz Band and played on Seattle-area radio stations.

In December 1990, a winter storm descended on the Puget Sound region while the Elwha was out of service for routine maintenance. Hurricane-force winds ripped mooring lines and repeatedly slammed the now partially adrift ferry into the concrete pier it was tied up alongside. The accident resulted in millions of dollars in damage and forever altered the ferry. The Elwha lost control while approaching the Anacortes terminal in January 1994 and destroyed the support structure for the pedestrian walkway. While on the Friday Harbor–Sidney run in July 1996, the ferry was taken on an alternate route around San Juan Island and was grounded on a rock, which damaged the hull.

On September 8, 1999, the vessel suffered another serious accident when a software glitch led to it ramming the Orcas Island ferry dock, causing $3.8 million worth of damage to the linkspan and other terminal structures.

=== Repairs and retirement ===
In April 2018, an inspection of the ferry uncovered 12,000 square feet (1,100 m^{2}) of corroded steel beneath the floor of the Elwha's main passenger cabin. Repairs to the ferry took seven months and cost $25 million.

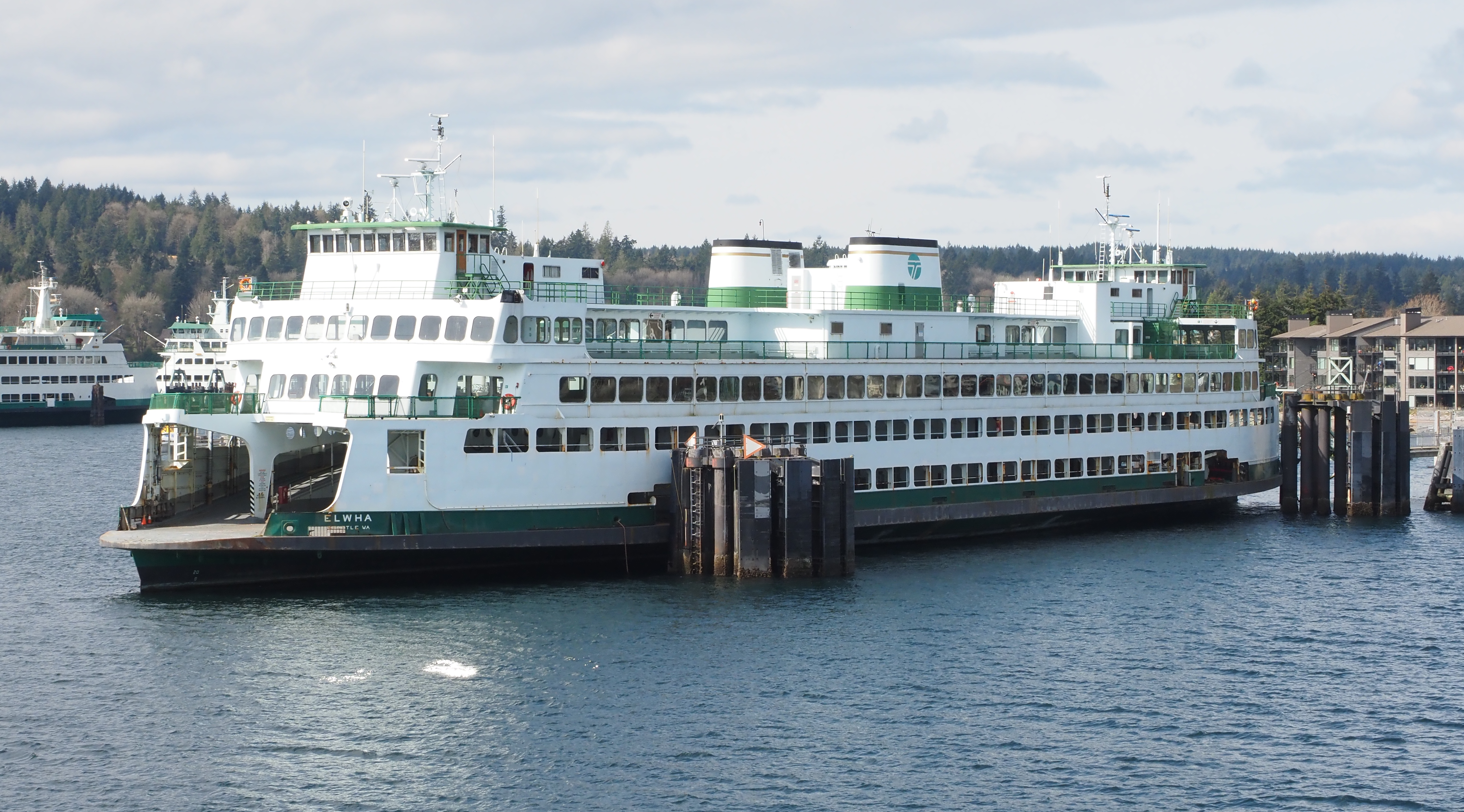
MV Elwha docked at Bainbridge Island

In July 2019, just eight months after her return to service, another routine inspection at Lake Union Drydock uncovered further steel corrosion on the ferry's car deck. Repairs were estimated at $35 million, and the ferry was placed in layup while WSF attempted to procure the necessary funding to repair the ferry. Following the passage of I-976 in November 2019, the State Legislature proposed to retire the ferry rather than fund the repairs. On April 17, 2020, following seven months of layup, the ferry was towed to Bainbridge Island to be taken out of service.

On August 16, 2024, the Washington State Department of Transportation (WSDOT) announced that the decommissioned Elwha and Klahowya would be sold for $100,000 each to Ecuadorian businessman Nelson Armas. The ferries would be scrapped and recycled in a "clean [and] green" facility in Ecuador after being towed from Eagle Harbor on Bainbridge Island. The two vessels were towed out into Elliott Bay on August 19 to begin their 35-day trip to Ecuador, but a malfunction with the towing equipment caused the trip to be postponed; the Elwha and Klahowya returned to Eagle Harbor. The crew on the tugboat were detained by U.S. Customs and Border Protection on August 30 after their work visas had expired. The sale of the two ferries was cancelled on September 5 after more issues with the tugboat and allegations of poor working conditions were disclosed; Armas forfeited the entire cost of the sale per the contract's terms.

WSF approved the sale of Elwha to Everett Ship Repair for $100,000 in January 2025. The company intends to reconfigure the ferry into a floating office and warehouse, replacing several trailers.
