= Ferries in Washington =

Ferries in Washington may refer to:

- Ferries in Washington (state)
- Ferries in Washington, D.C.
