= Public art of the Washington State Ferries system =

Public art of the Washington State Ferries system includes artwork on all or nearly all of the state's 23 ferries, available for viewing by millions of passengers annually. In addition to the public art installed aboard vessels, new terminal projects are required to set aside funds for artwork under Washington state law; a Kickstarter campaign funded art at the Banbridge Island terminal; and in one case, the hull of a former state ferry – MV Kalakala – is in the process of being repurposed as public art. Prior to the 2017 commissioning of the MV Chimacum, Washington State Ferries examined over 200 pieces of art before selecting 16 for display. Artwork for MV Suquamish was created by members of the Suquamish Tribe and selected by the tribal museum, to be displayed starting in 2018 for six to 12 years before replacement and return of the piece to the museum.

Seattle Arts Commission owns the Joshua Green Fountain, a bronze work by George Tsutakawa that was on display outside the main Colman Dock ferry terminal.

The agency has also displayed artwork by Washington youth on the covers of one million of its winter 2016 and spring 2017 sailing schedules.
