= MV Kaleetan =

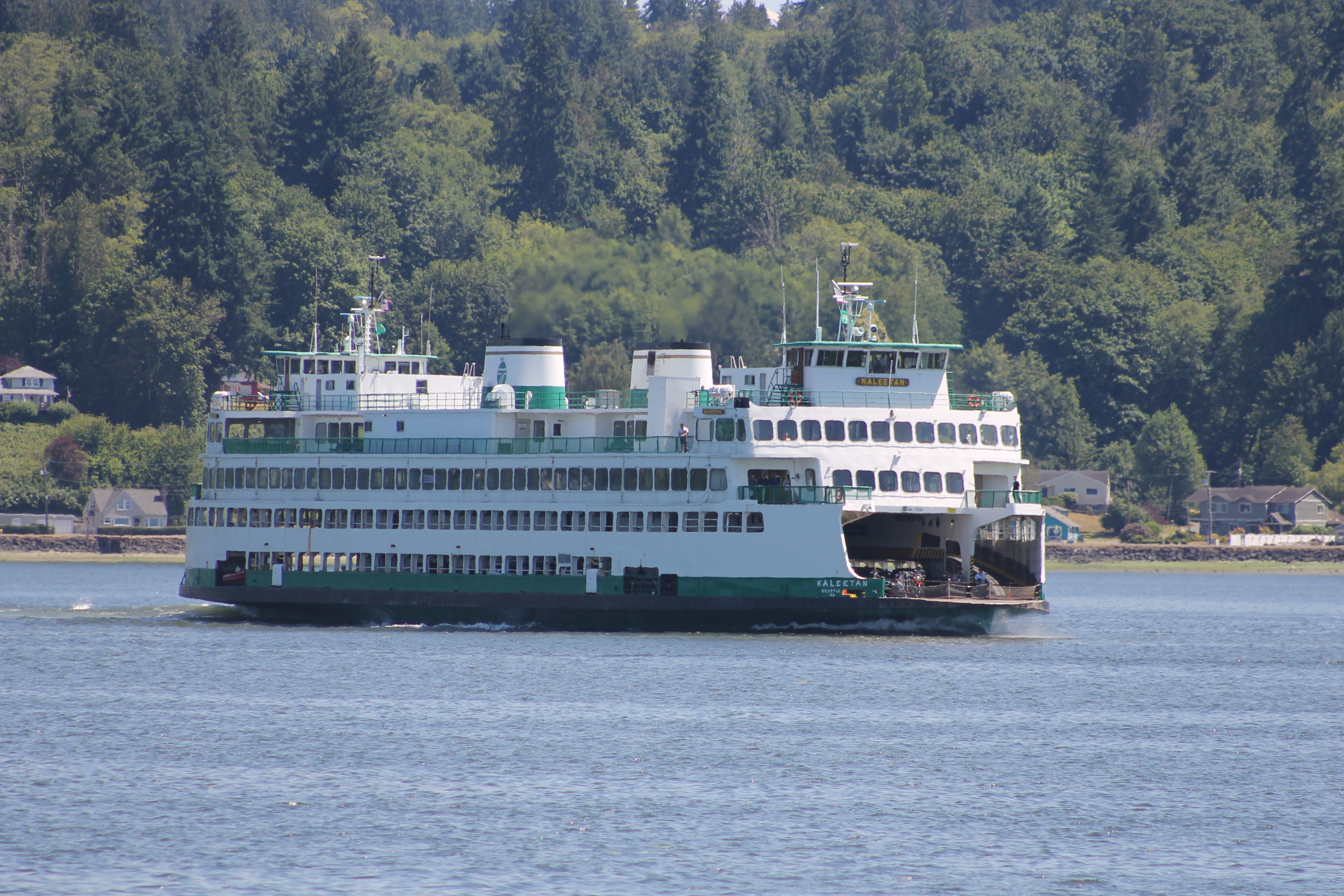
- Kaleetan in Bremerton in 2025

History
- Name: Kaleetan
- Owner: WSDOT
- Operator: Washington State Ferries
- Port of registry: Seattle, Washington
- Builder: National Steel and Ship Building (San Diego)
- Launched: March 12, 1967
- Completed: 1967
- Acquired: December 24, 1967
- In service: January 8, 1968
- Identification: IMO number: 8835346; MMSI number: 366772990; Callsign: WY2512
- Status: Operational

General characteristics
- Class & type: Super-class auto/passenger ferry
- Tonnage: 2,704 GT; 1,214 NT
- Displacement: 3,634 long tons (3,692 t)
- Length: 382 ft 2 in (116.5 m)
- Beam: 73 ft 2 in (22.3 m)
- Draft: 18 ft 6 in (5.6 m)
- Decks: 2 car decks 2 passenger decks (One with a Sun Deck Promenade)
- Deck clearance: 14 ft 5 in (4.4 m)
- Ramps: 4
- Installed power: Total 8,000 hp (6,000 kW) from 4 x diesel-electric engines
- Propulsion: 4 diesel-electric engines
- Speed: 17 knots (31 km/h; 20 mph)
- Capacity: 1,195 passengers; 144 vehicles (max 30 commercial); Originally 2,500 passengers; 160 vehicles
- Crew: 14

MV Kaleetan is a Super-class ferry operated by Washington State Ferries.

The Kaleetan (meaning arrow in Chinook Jargon) is named for a mountain peak northwest of Snoqualmie Pass. It can hold 144 vehicles, and 1868 passengers. It is in the third largest class of Washington State Ferries. It was built by National Steel and Shipbuilding in San Diego in 1967.

The Kaleetan went into service in early 1968 serving the Seattle-Bainbridge Island route. It was replaced by the Spokane in 1973 and moved north to the Anacortes-San Juan Islands route. It remained in the San Juans, until 1999, when it got a midlife upgrade.

Since its midlife overhaul, the Kaleetan has generally been assigned to the Seattle-Bremerton route, with periodic assignments in the San Juans when necessitated by maintenance schedules.
