= Elwha Rock =

Coordinates: 48°35′36.639″N 122°54′15.16″W

Elwha Rock is a submerged rock in Puget Sound. It lies in Cayou Channel (formerly known as Harney Channel) just west of Orcas Island's Grindstone Harbor at a depth of 5 feet (1.5 m) mean low water.

It was named for the ferry MV Elwha which ran aground on the then-uncharted rock in 1983. The ferry Nisqually ran aground on the same rock in 1994.

The Washington Board on Geographic Names approved the name in December 1989.

The rock was incorporated within San Juan Islands National Monument in 2013.
