= MV Chimacum =

Auto/passenger ferry operated in Washington State

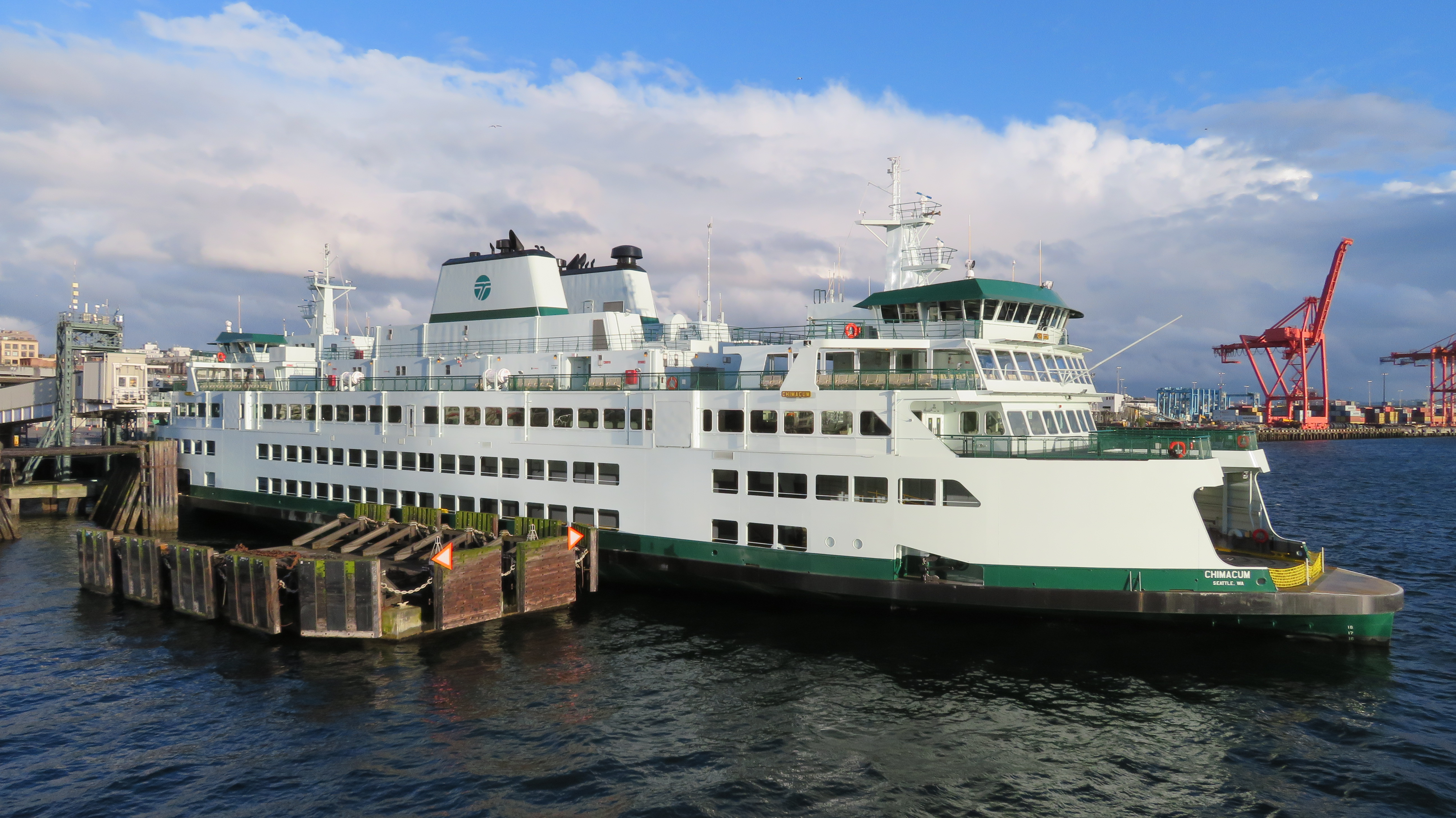
- Chimacum parked at Colman Dock in Downtown Seattle shortly after she was accepted by Washington State Ferries in April 2017

History
- Name: Chimacum
- Owner: Washington State Department of Transportation
- Operator: Washington State Ferries
- Port of registry: (United States) Seattle, Washington
- Route: Seattle–Bremerton
- Ordered: Spring 2014
- Builder: Vigor Industrial, Seattle, Washington
- Cost: $135 million (approximate)
- Laid down: December 9, 2014
- Launched: July 8, 2016
- Christened: September 14, 2016
- Acquired: April 7, 2017
- Maiden voyage: May 24, 2017 (temporary)
- In service: June 23, 2017 (official)
- Identification: IMO number: 9801770; MMSI number: 367712660; Callsign: WDI5854
- Status: In service

General characteristics
- Class & type: Olympic-class auto/passenger ferry
- Displacement: 4,363.77 long tons (4,433.80 t)
- Length: 362 ft 3 in (110.4 m)
- Beam: 83 ft 2 in (25.3 m)
- Draft: 18 ft (5.5 m)
- Depth: 24 ft 6 in (7.5 m)
- Decks: 5 (2 vehicle decks, passenger deck, sun deck, nav bridge deck)
- Deck clearance: 16 ft (4.9 m)
- Installed power: 6,000 hp (4,500 kW) total from two EMD 12-710G7C diesel engines
- Propulsion: Diesel
- Speed: 17 knots (31 km/h; 20 mph)
- Capacity: 1,500 passengers; 144 vehicles (max 34 tall vehicles)
- Crew: 14 (12 with sun deck closed)
- Notes: Source:

MV Chimacum is the third vessel of the Olympic-class auto ferries for the Washington State Ferries system. The ship was built by Vigor Industrial at their shipyard in Seattle, Washington and entered service on the Seattle–Bremerton route in 2017.

== Description and design ==
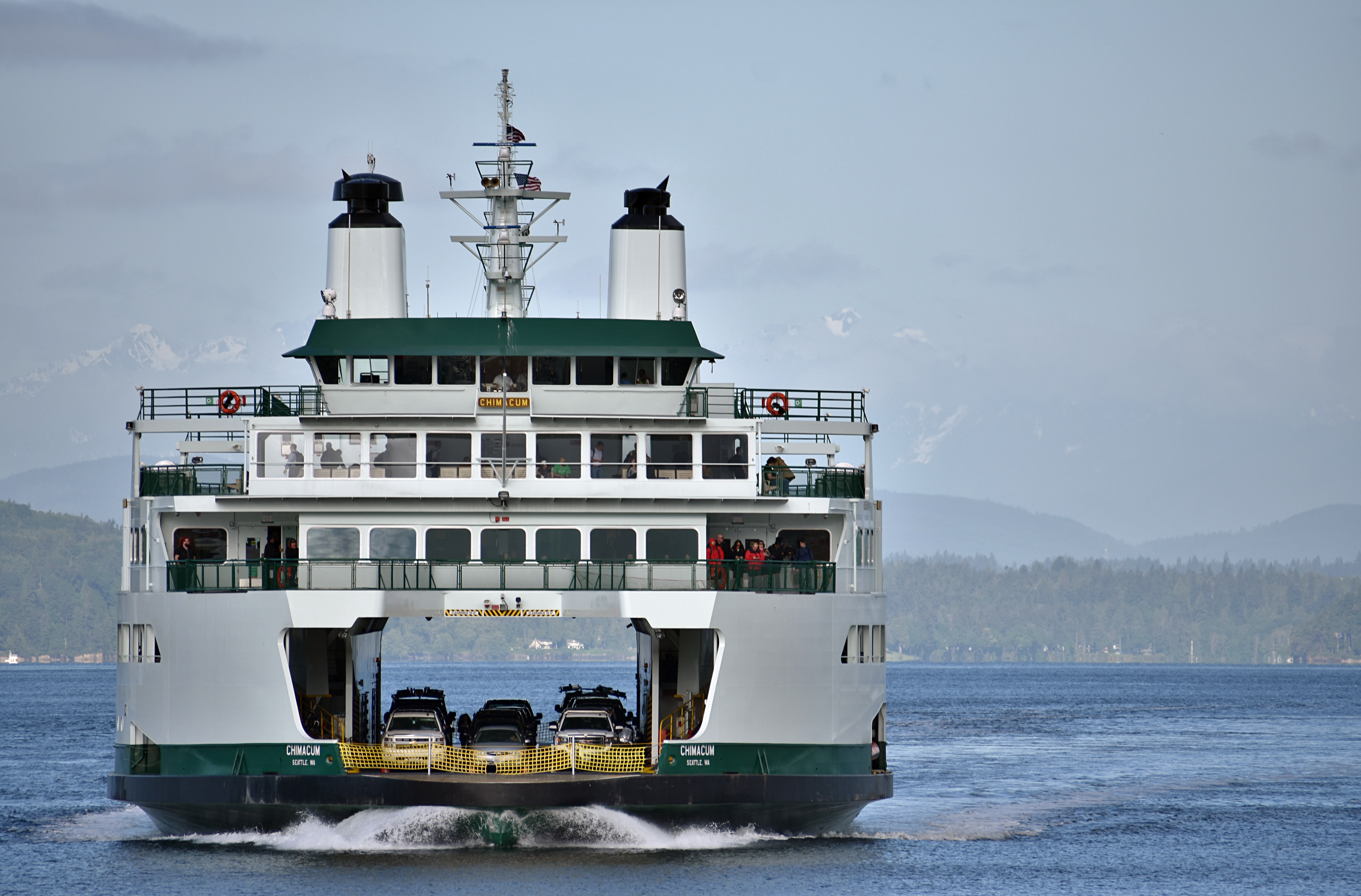
The Chimacum makes her first public arrival in Seattle after her first trip from Bremerton to Seattle with passengers on board

The Olympic-class auto ferries, also known as the 144 Car Ferries, are based on the Issaquah design. They measure 362 feet 0 inches (110.34 m) long overall and 335 ft 3 in (102.18 m) between perpendiculars with a beam at the lower vehicle deck of 83 ft 4 in (25.40 m) and a draft at design load waterline of 16 ft 6 in (5.03 m). The vessels have a displacement at design load waterline of 4,320 long tons (4,390 t).

Ferries of the Olympic class are powered by two Electro-Motive Diesel (EMD) two-stroke 12-710G7C diesel engines, each mounted at either end of the ferry turning a propeller at each end of the ship creating 6,000 shaft horsepower (4,500 kW) total. This gives the ships a maximum speed of 17 knots (31 km/h; 20 mph) and the vessels have capacity for 63,700 US gallons (241,000 L; 53,000 imp gal) of diesel fuel. The Olympic-class ferries were designed with two car decks, a sun deck and a passenger deck. They can load up to 144 automobiles, using a ramp that is two lanes wide. The ferries can embark 1,500 persons with seating for 1,300.

== Construction and career ==
The Olympic class is the result of the Washington State Department of Transportation requiring replacements for its aging ferry fleet. Funding for a third Olympic-class vessel was authorized in the Spring 2014 session of the Washington State Legislature, and the keel laying and first weld took place on December 9, 2014. The name Chimacum, the gathering place of the Chemakum tribe, was chosen by the Washington State Transportation Commission in November 2014.

She was christened on September 14, 2016 by Lynne Griffith, who at the time was serving as the head of the ferries system, the first woman to hold the office. The ceremony took place at the Vigor Industrial shipyard on Seattle's Harbor Island. She was delivered to Washington State Ferries on April 7, 2017, with her entry into service, replacing Klahowya, expected in the following months. The vessel cost $123 million approximately. Chimacum was forced into a three-day early temporary service on May 24 after Kitsap suffered a mechanical breakdown and all other vessels were in maintenance until Kaleetan, could replace her on the Seattle–Bremerton run to finish sea trials and training. The vessel entered regular service in June 2017 on the Seattle–Bremerton route. In November 2020, Chimacum was the only ferry servicing the route after emergency repairs were required for fleetmate Spokane.
