= MV Samish =

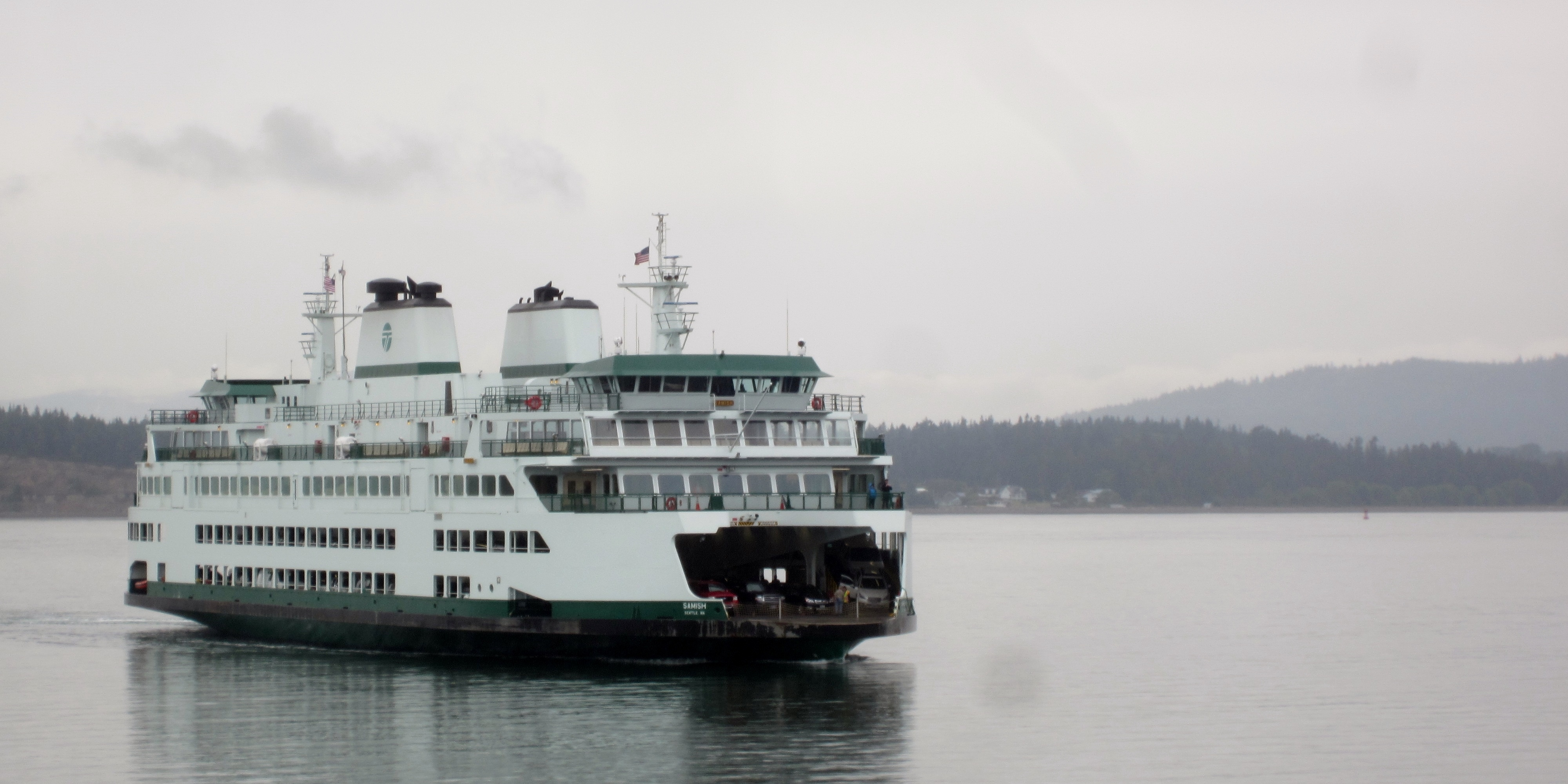
- Samish arriving in Anacortes in spring 2016.

History
- Name: Samish
- Owner: Washington State Department of Transportation
- Operator: Washington State Ferries
- Port of registry: Seattle, Washington, United States
- Route: Anacortes–San Juan Islands
- Ordered: Spring 2012
- Builder: Vigor Industrial, Seattle, Washington
- Cost: $126.45 million (approximate)
- Laid down: March 8, 2013
- Launched: May 12, 2014
- Christened: May 20, 2015
- Completed: April 10, 2015
- Maiden voyage: June 14, 2015
- In service: June 14, 2015
- Identification: IMO number: 9720251; MMSI number: 367649320; Callsign: WDH7552
- Status: In service

General characteristics
- Class & type: Olympic-class auto/passenger ferry
- Displacement: 4,384 long tons (4,454 t)
- Length: 362 ft 3 in (110.4 m)
- Beam: 83 ft 2 in (25.3 m)
- Draft: 18 ft (5.5 m)
- Depth: 24 ft 6 in (7.5 m)
- Decks: 5 (2 vehicle decks, passenger deck, sun deck, nav bridge deck)
- Deck clearance: 16 ft (4.9 m)
- Installed power: 6,000 hp (4,500 kW) total from two EMD 12-710G7C diesel engines
- Propulsion: Diesel
- Speed: 17 knots (31 km/h; 20 mph)
- Capacity: 1,500 passengers; 144 vehicles (max 34 tall vehicles)
- Crew: 14 (12 with sun deck closed)

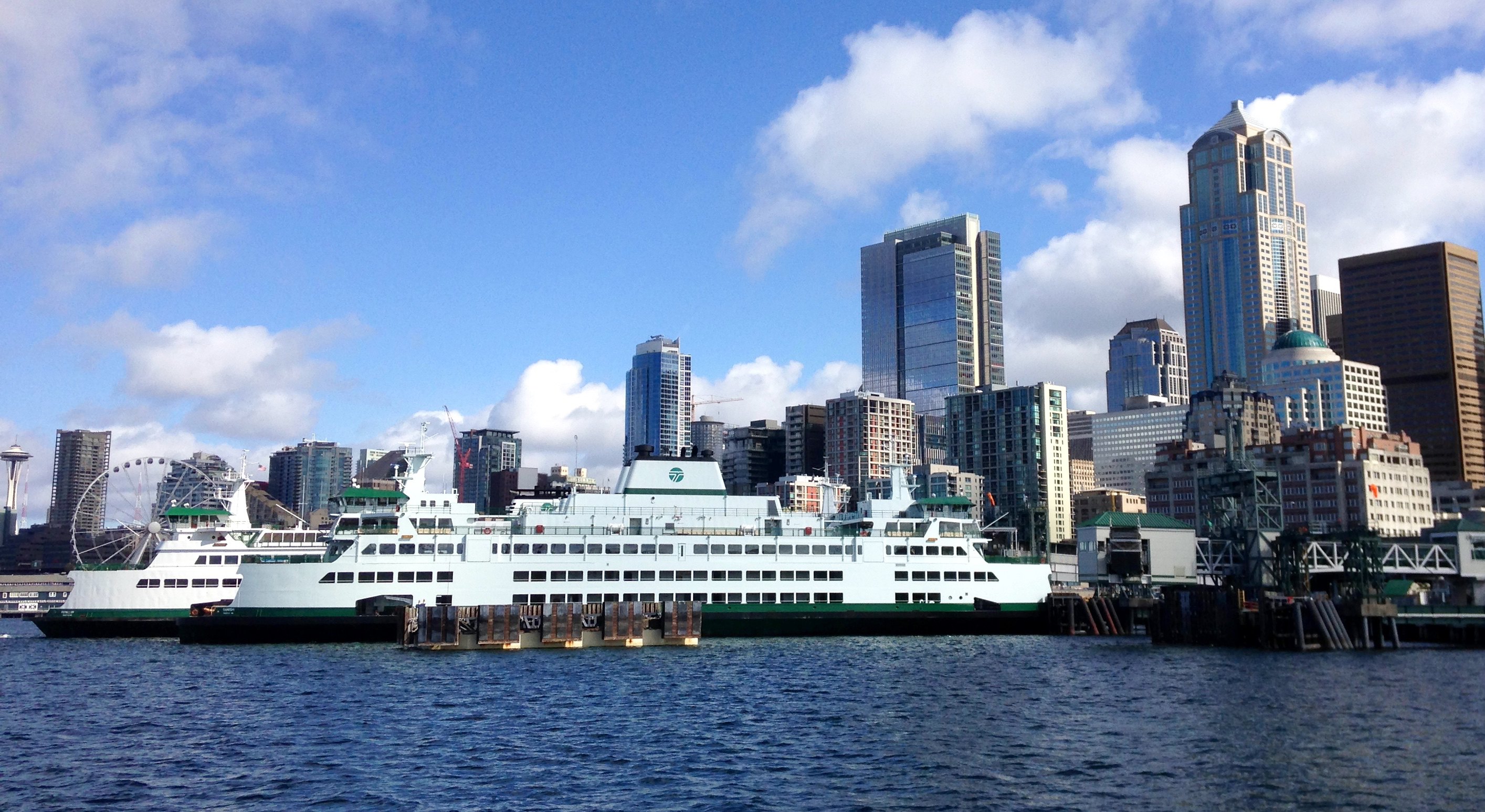
Samish parked at Colman Dock in Downtown Seattle shortly after she was accepted by Washington State Ferries in April 2015.

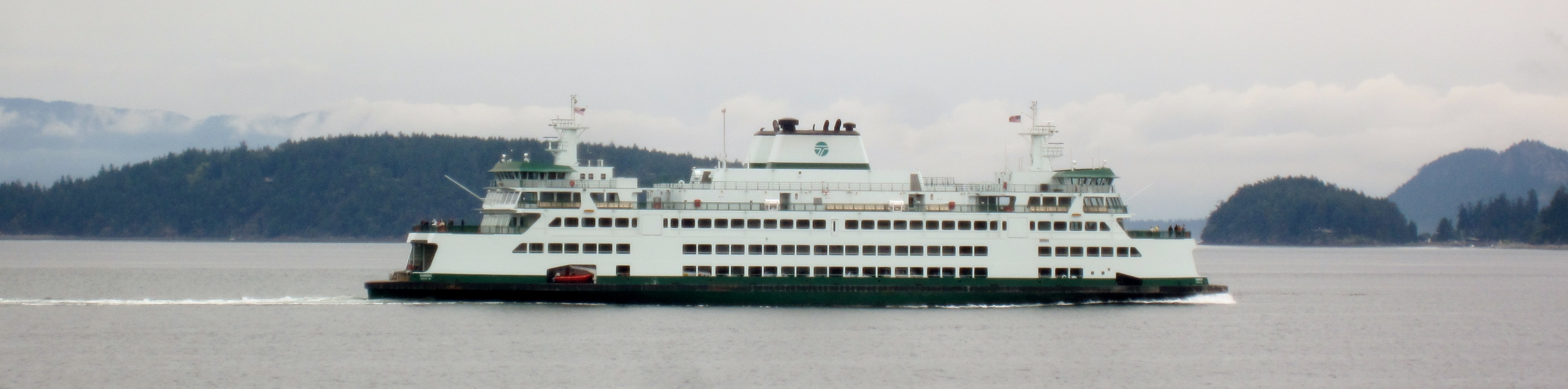
The MV Samish rounds Lopez Island, heading for Anacortes from Friday Harbor. Taken from the MV Hyak.

MV Samish is the second vessel of the Olympic-class auto ferries built by Vigor Industrial for the Washington State Ferries system. The vessel started service with her maiden voyage to Friday Harbor as the #3 Boat in the San Juans on June 14, 2015.

== History ==
Funding for a second Olympic-class vessel was authorized in the spring 2012 session of the Washington State Legislature and the keel laying and first weld took place on March 8, 2013.

The name Samish was decided by the Washington State Transportation Commission on November 13, 2012 (the same day of the naming of the MV Tokitae) after a public outreach process. The vessel is named after the Samish Indian Nation, a Coast Salish tribe whose name means "giving people".

On December 21, 2013, the ship's superstructure was rolled out from Nichols Brothers Boat Builders and sent to Seattle on December 23 to be joined with the hull which was under construction at the Vigor Shipyards.

The Samish was accepted by Washington State Ferries on April 10, 2015 and was officially christened on May 20 in Anacortes. The ship underwent two months of sea trials and crew training before entering service on the Anacortes/San Juan Islands route at the start of the Summer 2015 sailing season on June 14 at 9:05 am sailing from Anacortes to Friday Harbor.

The Samish is also listed as one of the 10 Best Passenger Ships of 2015 (the year she was launched), on Marine Log.

== Routes ==
The Samish is assigned to the Anacortes-San Juan Islands route. She has also served on the Mukilteo-Clinton, Edmonds-Kingston, and Seattle-Bremerton routes.

== Incidents ==
The Samish was pulled from service on February 21, 2016, after the discovery of a quarter-sized hole in the hull below the water line, later found during a drydock inspection to be linked to corrosion. The ferry was re-entered service on March 10 after some minor patchwork.

On August 7, 2017, the Samish was removed from service due to a problem with the number two drive engine, causing the Anacortes/San Juan Islands route to be operated on an emergency four boat schedule until a replacement boat entered service.

On March 10, 2024, the Samish assisted US Coast Guard crews in the rescue of 6 passengers and 2 dogs from a private vessel in distress in the Rosario Strait. Samish took on 4 passengers before the Coast Guard arrived, and positioned the ferry to provide protection from wind and waves for the rescue effort.

== Numbers and ship recognition ==
The Samish has three numbers used to identify it. The first is her IMO Number. The Samish's IMO Number is 9720251. Her MMSI (Marine Mobile Service Identity), 367649320. Her Radio Call Sign WDH7552. The Samish is owned by Washington State Ferries, a branch of the Washington State Department of Transportation. She is flagged in the United States, and listed as an AIS Passenger Vessel.
