= Olympic-class ferry =

Auto/passenger ferries operated by Washington State

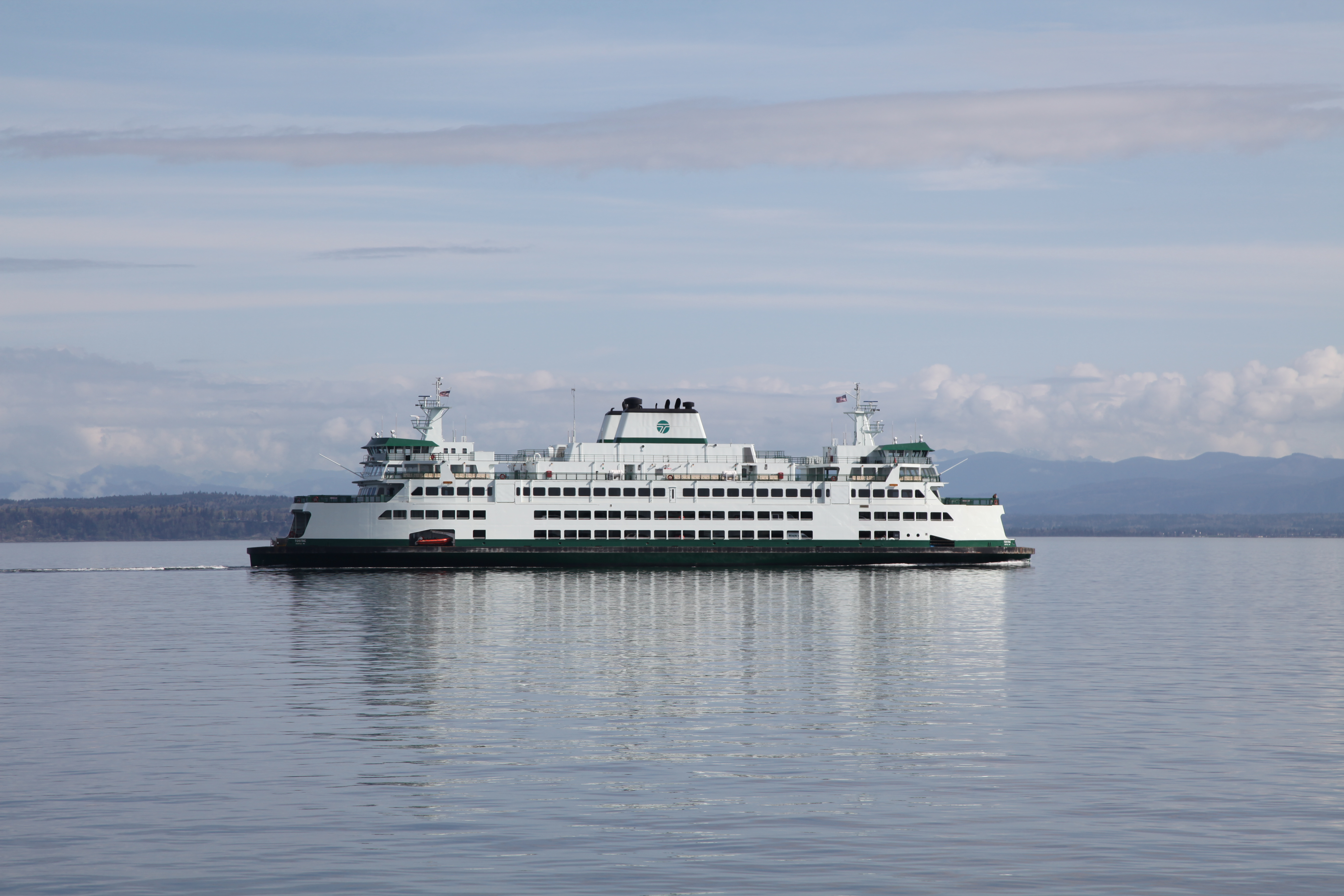
- The Tokitae en route from Clinton to Mukilteo.

Class overview
- Builders: Vigor Shipyards, Seattle, Washington
- Operators: Washington State Ferries
- Preceded by: Evergreen State class; Super class
- Built: 2012–2018
- In service: 2014–present
- Planned: 7
- Completed: 4
- Active: 4

General characteristics
- Type: Auto/passenger ferry
- Displacement: 4,384 long tons (4,454 t)
- Length: 362 ft 3 in (110.4 m)
- Beam: 83 ft 2 in (25.3 m)
- Draft: 18 ft (5.5 m)
- Depth: 24 ft 6 in (7.5 m)
- Decks: 5 (2 vehicle decks, passenger deck, sun deck, nav bridge deck)
- Deck clearance: 16 ft (4.9 m)
- Installed power: 6,000 hp (4,500 kW) total from two diesel engines or future lithium-ion battery
- Propulsion: Diesel (integrated electric propulsion capable)
- Speed: 17 knots (31 km/h; 20 mph)
- Capacity: 1,500 passengers; 144 vehicles (max 34 tall vehicles)
- Crew: 14 (12 with sun deck closed)

The Olympic class are roll-on/roll-off ferries designed for Washington State Ferries (WSF), a government agency in the U.S. state of Washington. They are the newest class in the WSF fleet and intended to replace the Evergreen State-class ferries that are near retirement age. The ferry design is based on the Issaquah-class ferries which have proven to be the most reliable and versatile in the fleet. The Olympic-class ferries are designed to serve all routes and terminals in the Washington State Ferries system. All vessels were built in Washington as required by state law since July 2001.

== Ferries ==
Ferries in this class include:

- MV Tokitae
- MV Samish
- MV Chimacum
- MV Suquamish

== History ==
In the early 2000s, Washington State Ferries began planning a replacement for their aging Steel Electric-class ferries, which were built in 1927 and were their oldest ferries. They were the only vessels in the fleet that were able to run on the Port Townsend-Keystone route as no other vessel could be used in the small, shallow Keystone Harbor. Washington State Ferries planned to move the ferry terminal out of Keystone Harbor and build a 144-car vessel to replace the 60-car Steel Electrics used on the route. Some local residents opposed this plan, so no new ferries were built. When the Steel Electrics were retired in 2007 due to hull corrosion, no auto ferries were able to serve the Port Townsend - Keystone route. The Steel Electrics were replaced by three smaller Kwa-di Tabil-class ferries that carry 64 cars and entered service between November 2010 and January 2012.

It was announced on June 20, 2012, in The Seattle Times that State of Washington Transportation Secretary Paula Hammond had selected the name "Olympic class" from more than 130 suggestions from department employees. On November 13, 2012, the Washington State Transportation commission named the first ferry MV Tokitae and the second MV Samish.

The Tokitae's hull was rolled out of the construction building onto a drydock on March 2, 2013. It was joined by the superstructure from Nichols Brothers Boatbuilders of Freeland, Whidbey Island on March 3, 2013. On March 5, 2013, the superstructure was on top of the hull.

The keel laying of the Samish happened on March 8, 2013. Washington State Governor Jay Inslee was the one to strike the first weld on the Samish.

Funding for a third Olympic-class vessel was authorized in the Spring 2014 session of the Washington State Legislature and the keel laying and first weld took place on December 9, 2014.

The name Chimacum was picked for the third ferry by the Washington State Transportation Commission in November 2014 after a public outreach process.

The Samish was accepted by Washington State Ferries on April 10, 2015, and christened on May 20 in Anacortes. The ship underwent two months of sea trials and crew training before entering service on the Anacortes/San Juan Islands route at the start of the Summer 2015 sailing season on June 14.

Funding for a fourth Olympic-class ship was authorized in the 2015 session of the Washington State Legislature with construction beginning on January 4, 2016.

The Chimacum joined the fleet on April 7, 2017.

Washington State Ferries took delivery of the Suquamish in July 2018, and the ship entered revenue service on the Mukilteo/Clinton run on October 4, 2018.

=== Hybrid diesel–electric series ===
In 2019, the state legislature contracted with Vigor to build five additional Olympic-class vessels. The ferries in this second series were to be powered by a hybrid diesel-electric powerplant built by ABB, with either on-board diesel engines or shore-based electrical connections charging a lithium-ion battery bank. The 2019 legislation allocated $99 million to the project, which funded design work, the purchase of major components for two ferries, and the beginning of construction on the first vessel. As of mid-2020, Vigor had planned to begin building the first hybrid Olympic-class ferry in 2021 for delivery in late 2023 or early 2024, contingent on the state allocating the remaining required funds in a 2021 session. However, in 2022, contract negotiations between WSDOT and Vigor broke down. In late 2023, WSDOT unveiled plans for a new hybrid electric vessel class based on the Olympic-class design- the first vessel of this new class is expected to enter service in 2028.
