= Keller Ferry =

Ferry crossing on Franklin D. Roosevelt Lake in the US state of Washington

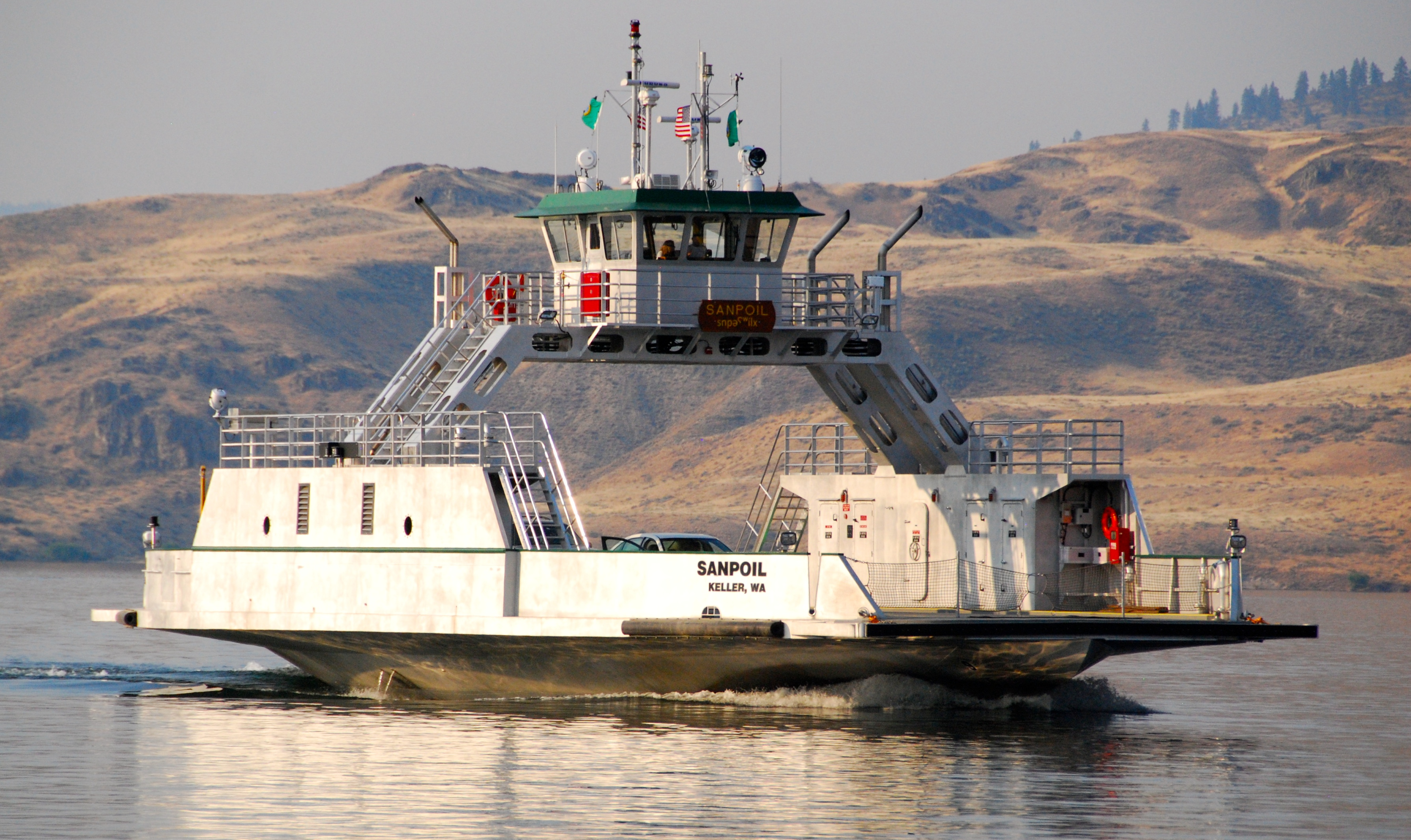
- Locale: Clark; Keller
- Waterway: Lake Roosevelt, Columbia River
- Transit type: Passenger and automobile ferry
- Operator: Washington State Department of Transportation
- Began operation: Early 1890s
- System length: 1.3 miles (2.1 km)
- No. of vessels: 1 (M/V Sanpoil)
- No. of terminals: 2

The Keller Ferry, historically the Clark Ferry, is a ferry crossing on Franklin D. Roosevelt Lake in the US state of Washington. The crossing carries State Route 21 between the Colville Indian Reservation in Ferry County and Clark in Lincoln County. The ferry crossing has been in operation since the 1890s and under state control since 1930. During that time, five vessels have served the crossing, including the Martha S., which operated from 1948 to 2013, and the current ferry, the M/V Sanpoil.

The M/V Sanpoil is the only Washington State Department of Transportation (WSDOT) owned and operated ferry in Eastern Washington; the others are on Puget Sound in Western Washington. This was the first ferry crossing operated by the state of Washington; Washington State Ferries did not begin operations on Puget Sound until 1951. The other fare-free public ferry in Eastern Washington, the Gifford–Inchelium ferry, is operated by the Colville Confederated Tribes.

Hours of operation are 6:00 a.m. to midnight 7 days per week; the ride is approximately 8 minutes. The fare to ride is free.

== Vessels ==
=== Keller, L. A. McLeod & San Poil ===
Before the construction of the Grand Coulee Dam, the Keller, a cable ferry, served the crossing, at the confluence of the Columbia River and the Sanpoil River. The Keller had an on-board motor to winch the boat across the river.

The L. A. McLeod, a Diesel powered side-wheeler, served the crossing from 1939 to 1944, a period which saw the completion of the Grand Coulee Dam and the formation of Lake Roosevelt.

Between 1944 and 1948, the route was served by a barge called the San Poil, which was pushed by a tugboat, the Ann of Wilbur.

=== Martha S. ===
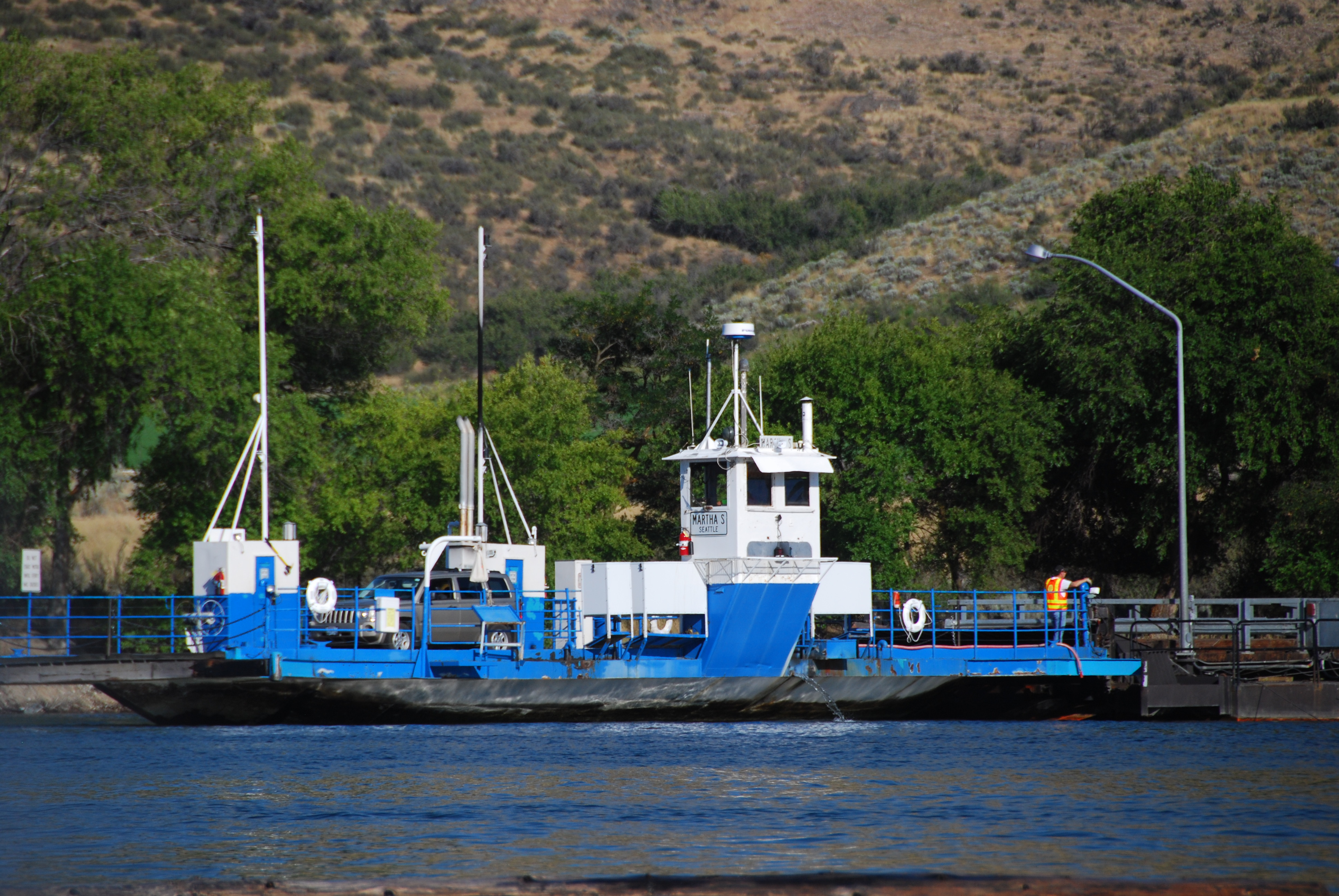
The Martha S.

Launched in 1948, the Martha S., was powered by two diesel engines making total 470 horsepower, and was 80 feet in length and 30 feet in beam. Its maximum capacity was 12 cars, or a single tractor-trailer truck alone, but it was unable to accommodate highway legal double tractor-trailer trucks. The ferry was in service from its launch until its retirement on Sunday, July 7, 2013. The vessel was named in honor of Martha Shain, the wife of State Highway Director Clarence Shain at the time it was put in service.

=== M/V Sanpoil ===
The current Keller ferry, the M/V Sanpoil, is 116 feet in length, and is designed to carry 20 passenger vehicles, two single tractor-trailer trucks and 9 passenger vehicles, or a double tractor-trailer truck and 8 passenger vehicles. It was christened, received a tribal blessing, and began service on August 14, 2013, after the Martha S. docks were refit to handle the larger replacement vessel. The name "Sanpoil" is an Anglicized version of the name of the native peoples of the surrounding area, and is the name of the river adjacent SR 21 to the north of the ferry.

The project to acquire a replacement ferry for the Martha S. was funded by the Washington State Legislature during the 2011 session. The Colville Confederated Tribes contributed $2 million of the approximately $12 million cost of the new vessel. On November 16, 2011, WSDOT awarded a contract for construction of the replacement vessel with delivery slated for May 2013. Justification for replacing the Martha S. included replacement parts for it no longer being commercially manufactured, requiring them to be custom-made as needed. The M/V Sanpoil was shipped overland via truck from Rainier, Oregon in March 2013.

== See also ==
- Ferries in Washington State
- Washington State Ferries
