= MV Yakima =

Ferry

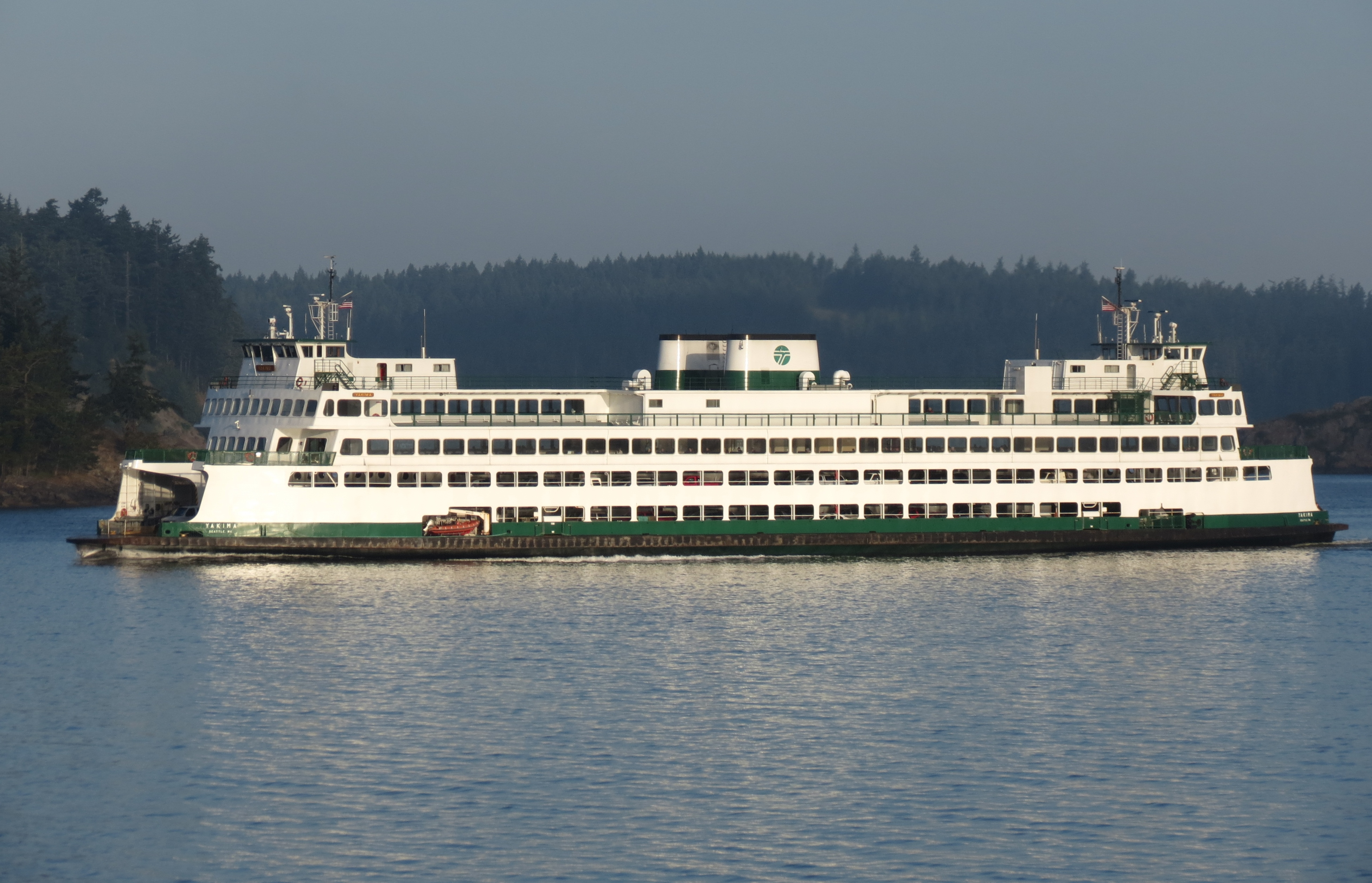
- Yakima in 2013

History
- Name: Yakima
- Owner: WSDOT
- Operator: Washington State Ferries
- Port of registry: Seattle, Washington, US
- Route: Anacortes-San Juan Islands
- Builder: National Steel and Shipbuilding of San Diego
- Launched: May 20, 1967
- Christened: May 20, 1967
- Completed: 1967
- Acquired: March 23, 1968
- Maiden voyage: March 23, 1968
- In service: March 1968
- Identification: IMO number: 8835360; MMSI number: 366772750; Callsign: WCD7863
- Status: Operational

General characteristics
- Class & type: Super-class auto/passenger ferry
- Tonnage: 2,704 GT; 1,214 NT
- Displacement: 3,634 long tons (3,692 t)
- Length: 382 ft 2 in (116.5 m)
- Beam: 73 ft 2 in (22.3 m)
- Draft: 18 ft 6 in (5.6 m)
- Decks: 5
- Deck clearance: 15 ft 6 in (4.7 m)
- Ramps: 4
- Installed power: Total 8,000 hp (6,000 kW) from 4 x diesel-electric engines
- Propulsion: 4 diesel-electric engines
- Speed: 17 knots (31 km/h; 20 mph)
- Capacity: 1,195 passengers; 144 vehicles (max 30 commercial)
- Crew: 14

MV Yakima is a Super-class ferry operated by Washington State Ferries. The Yakima was built in 1967 for the Seattle–Bremerton run and remained there until the early 1980s when she was moved to the Edmonds–Kingston run where she was a better match for ridership levels.

In 1999 she was extensively rebuilt, and then she was moved to the Anacortes–San Juan Islands route. She was removed from service in the spring of 2014 to have her drive motors rebuilt, and returned to service in Fall 2014.

It is believed that her alert horn is tuned to an A_{2}.

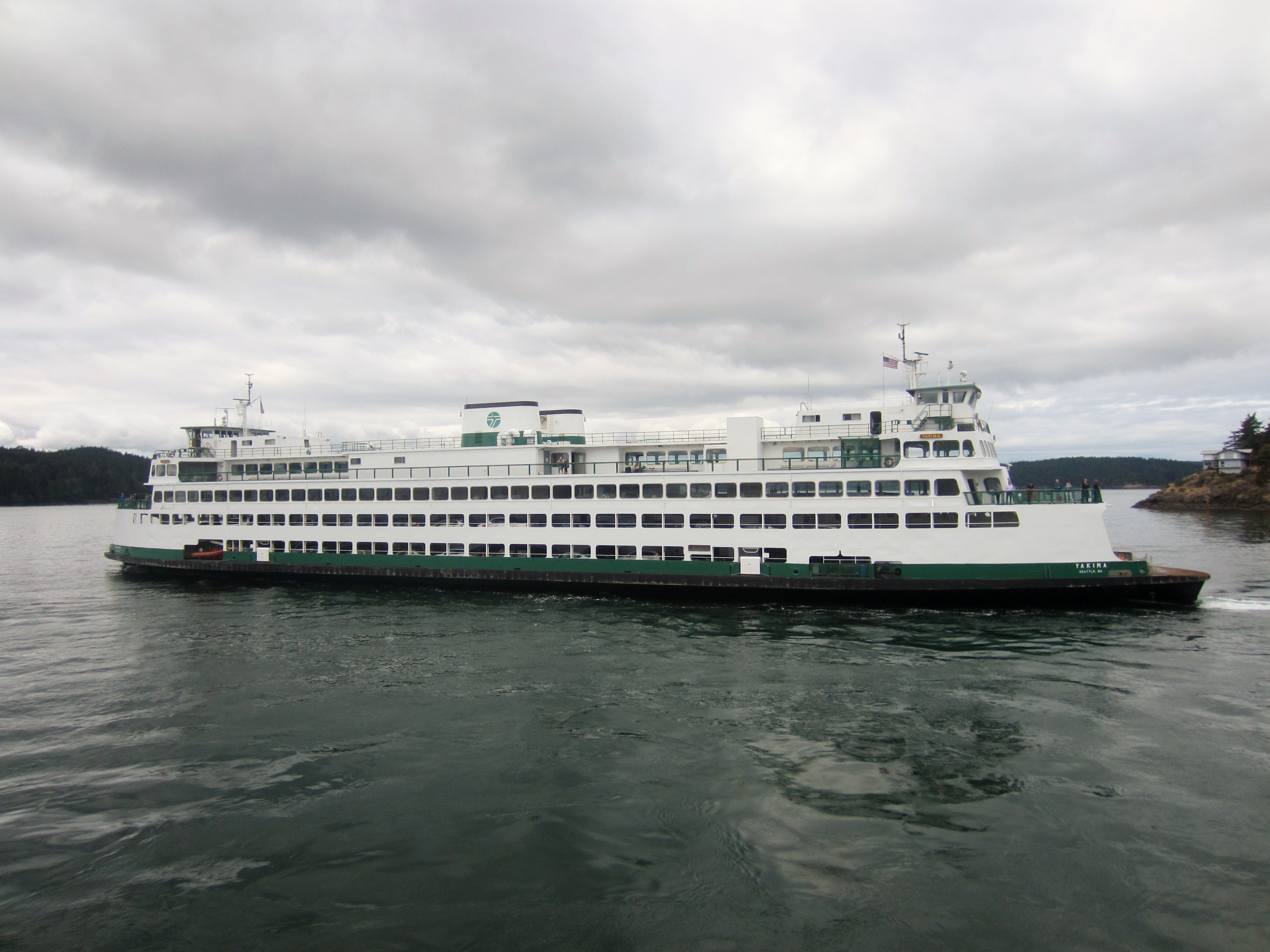
MV Yakima departing Orcas Island

In March 2016 there was a fire on the vessel while running in the San Juan Islands. The vessel clogged passage to and from Friday harbor for several hours and the ship was out of service for some time. The Yakima has since returned to service in the San Juans.
