= Clark, Washington =

Unincorporated community in Washington, United States

Clark, Washington Keller Ferry
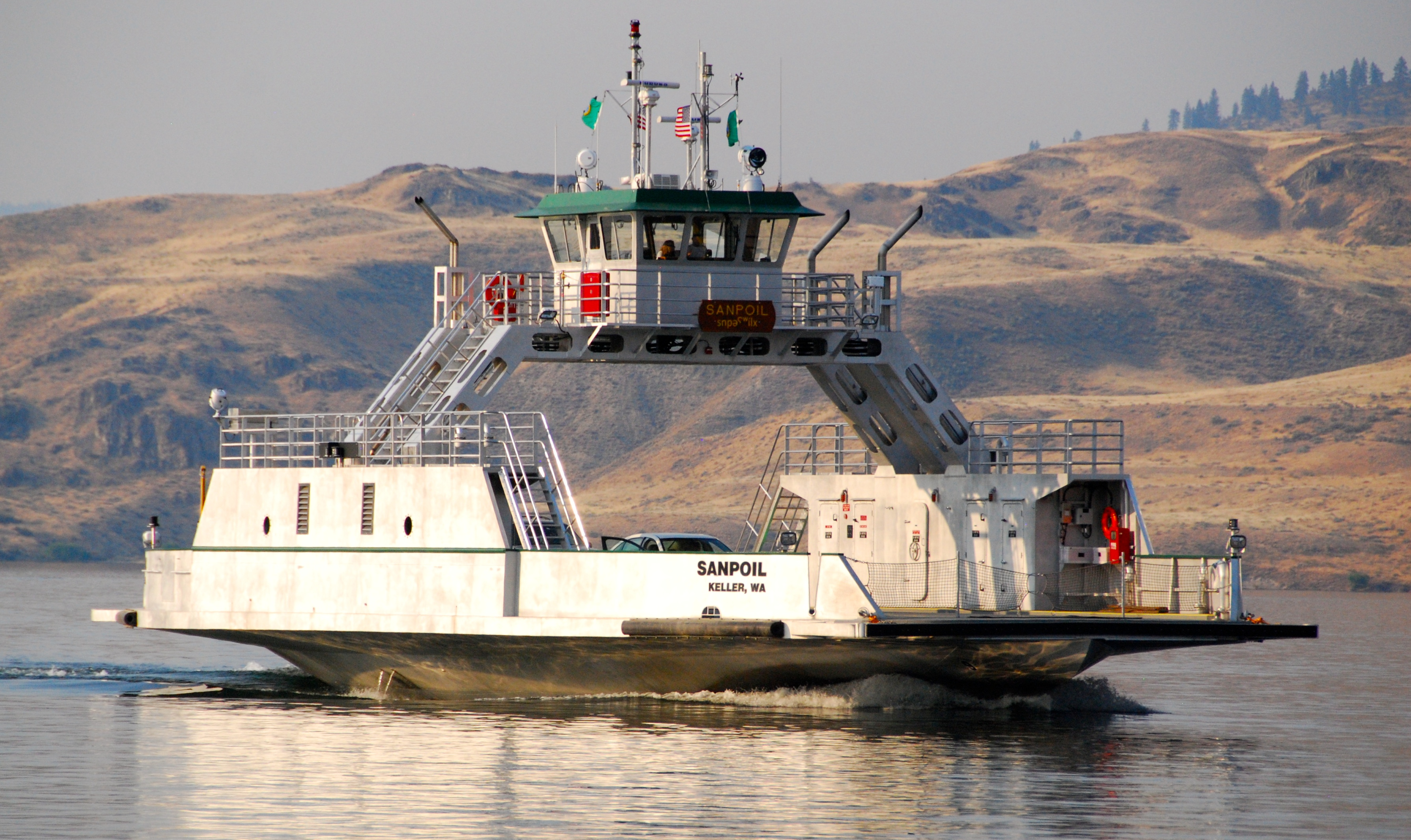
- The Keller Ferry

- Location within Washington (state) Location within the United States
- Coordinates: 47°55′29″N 118°41′21″W
- Country: United States
- State: Washington
- County: Lincoln County
- Named for: Todd Clark
- Time zone: UTC-8 (PST)
  - Summer (DST): UTC-7 (PDT)
- ZIP code: 99185
- Area code: 509
- GNIS feature ID: 2786072

Clark—also known as Keller Ferry—is an unincorporated community located along the Columbia River in the U.S. state of Washington, in Lincoln County. Most buildings in the community are grouped around the Keller Ferry Campground at the south side of the Keller Ferry crossing. There are several businesses, including a car repair shop and a convenience store. The community is located on Lake Roosevelt, just south of the Lake Roosevelt National Recreation Area. The town is named after Todd Clark. At one time, the town also had a post office.
