= Anacortes–San Juan Islands ferry =

Ferry routes in the U.S. state of Washington

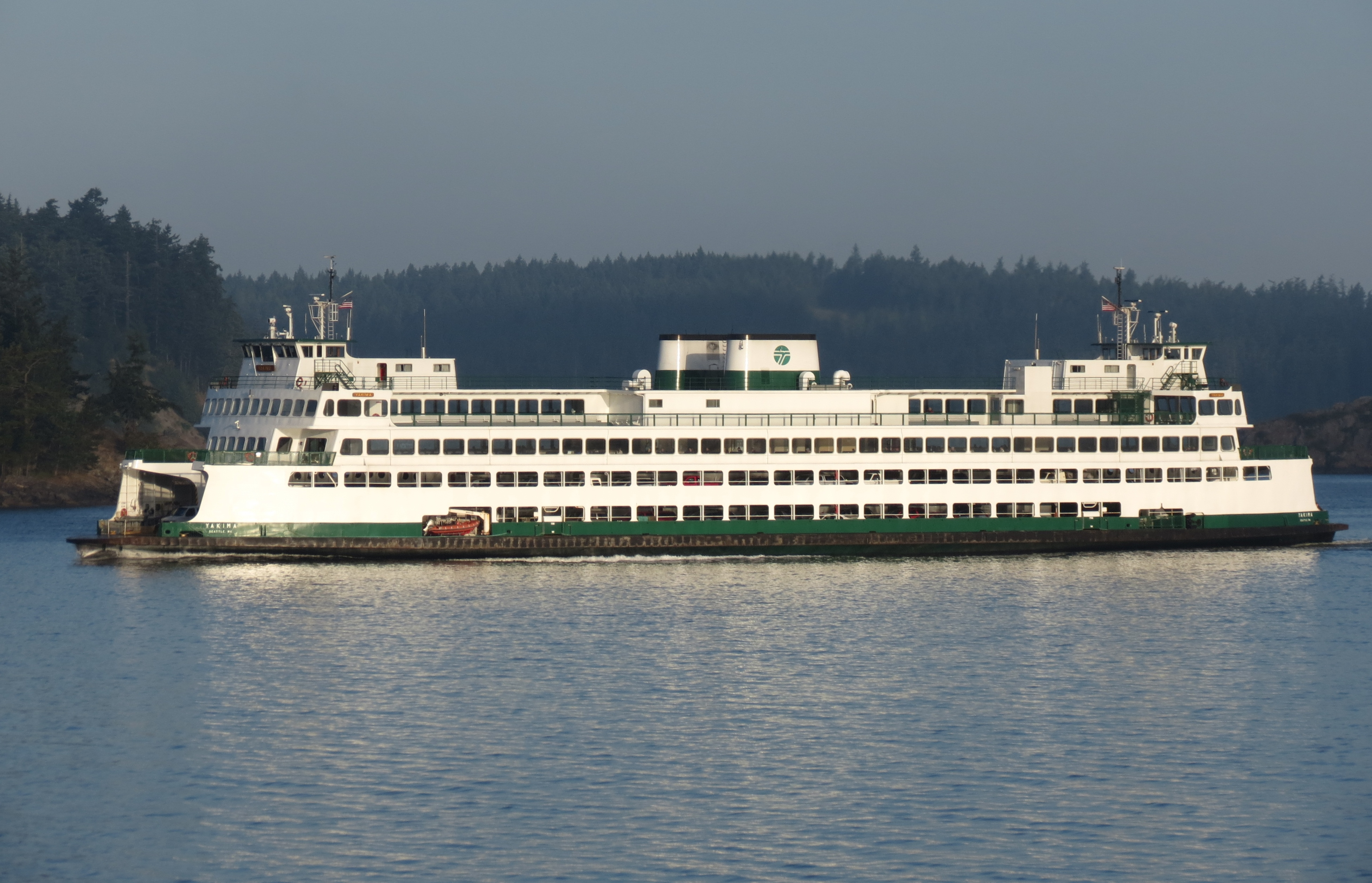
- MV Yakima in the San Juan Islands
- Locale: San Juan Islands
- Waterway: Rosario Strait; Haro Strait (Sidney only)
- Transit type: Auto/passenger ferry
- Route: Anacortes–Lopez Island–Shaw Island–Orcas Island–Friday Harbor–Sidney, BC
- Carries: SR 20 Spur
- Operator: Washington State Ferries
- Travel time: 1–2 hours (Anacortes–Friday Harbor)
- No. of terminals: 6
- Yearly ridership: 1,890,458 (2022)
- Yearly vehicles: 921,088 (2022)
- Connections at Anacortes
- Bus: Skagit Transit
- Road: SR 20 Spur
- Connections at Sidney, BC
- Bus: BC Transit
- Road: Highway 17
Route map
Ferry terminals on the Anacortes–San Juan Islands route

The Anacortes–San Juan Islands ferry is a system of ferry routes operated by Washington State Ferries in the United States. The routes serve Anacortes, Lopez Island, Shaw Island, Orcas Island, San Juan Island, and Sidney on Vancouver Island in Canada. Sidney service was suspended in March 2020 and is not planned to resume until 2030. The ferry routes are part of State Route 20 Spur (SR 20 Spur).

The mainland hub for the system is Anacortes on Fidalgo Island in Skagit County, which is connected to the rest of the state by SR 20 Spur. The ferries travel across Rosario Strait and through Thatcher Pass to reach the San Juan Islands. In the post-Covid 2023+ timeframe, approximately 2–4% of all scheduled sailings were cancelled, primarily due to vessel and staffing issues, though cancellations can also occur due to sea conditions in the Rosario Strait in the fall and winter.

The route is served by between three and five vessels. Year-round three vessels are used for domestic travel to the islands, with one of those vessels equipped for international travel between Anacortes and Sidney, BC (Vancouver Island) during the spring, summer and fall. A fourth vessel for inter-island travel between the islands is added during the spring, summer and fall schedules. During the busy summer tourism season, a fifth vessel is added to the route for domestic travel to the islands.

As of 2024, the main vessels on the Anacortes–San Juan Islands routes are:

- MV Kaleetan
- MV Samish
- MV Tillikum
- MV Yakima

As of December 2021, the MV Tillikum is used as the inter-island vessel during the spring, summer and fall schedules.

== History ==
Ferry service to the San Juan Islands was provided by a variety of companies and operators in the early 20th century. On April 26, 1922, the Anacortes–Sidney route was inaugurated on two converted steamships and later ran three daily sailings. The Puget Sound Navigation Company later cut the daily sailings to two and moved a midday trip to terminate in Bellingham instead of Anacortes. The state-owned Washington State Ferries took control of the routes in 1951 and assigned MV Vashon to the San Juan Islands runs. The international section survived proposed funding cuts in 1977, 1997, 2002, and 2009 that would have suspended or terminated service to Vancouver Island. Among the issues was a reduction in ridership and increased standards for international vessels imposed by the United States Coast Guard.

WSF began offering reservations for trips on the San Juan routes in January 2015 in response to chronic overcrowding of passenger vehicles. The reservations are split into batches, with spots released two months, two weeks, and two days prior to sailings; 10 percent were set aside for standby vehicles. Reservations were free but incurred a $10 fee if unused on the same day. The system was implemented following a 2009 mandate from the state legislature as a stopgap measure to control capacity while new vessels and expanded terminals were constructed. The reservations system suffered from website crashes and glitches in its first months, but was received well by local residents.

In March 2020, WSF suspended service to Sidney on Vancouver Island due to international travel restrictions imposed by Canada and the United States amid the COVID-19 pandemic. At the time, seasonal service had been expected to begin on March 29, but was delayed a month—and later indefinitely. A shortage of available maritime workers and vessels prevented service to Sidney from being restored after travel restrictions were lifted in 2021; the shortage also caused "unprecedented" service disruptions to the still-operating San Juan services, where 45 percent of trips from July 2021 to June 2022 were delayed. As of February 2023, the Sidney route is not planned to be restored until 2030 due to vessel availability issues.
