= Seattle–Bremerton ferry =

Ferry route in Seattle, Washington, U.S.

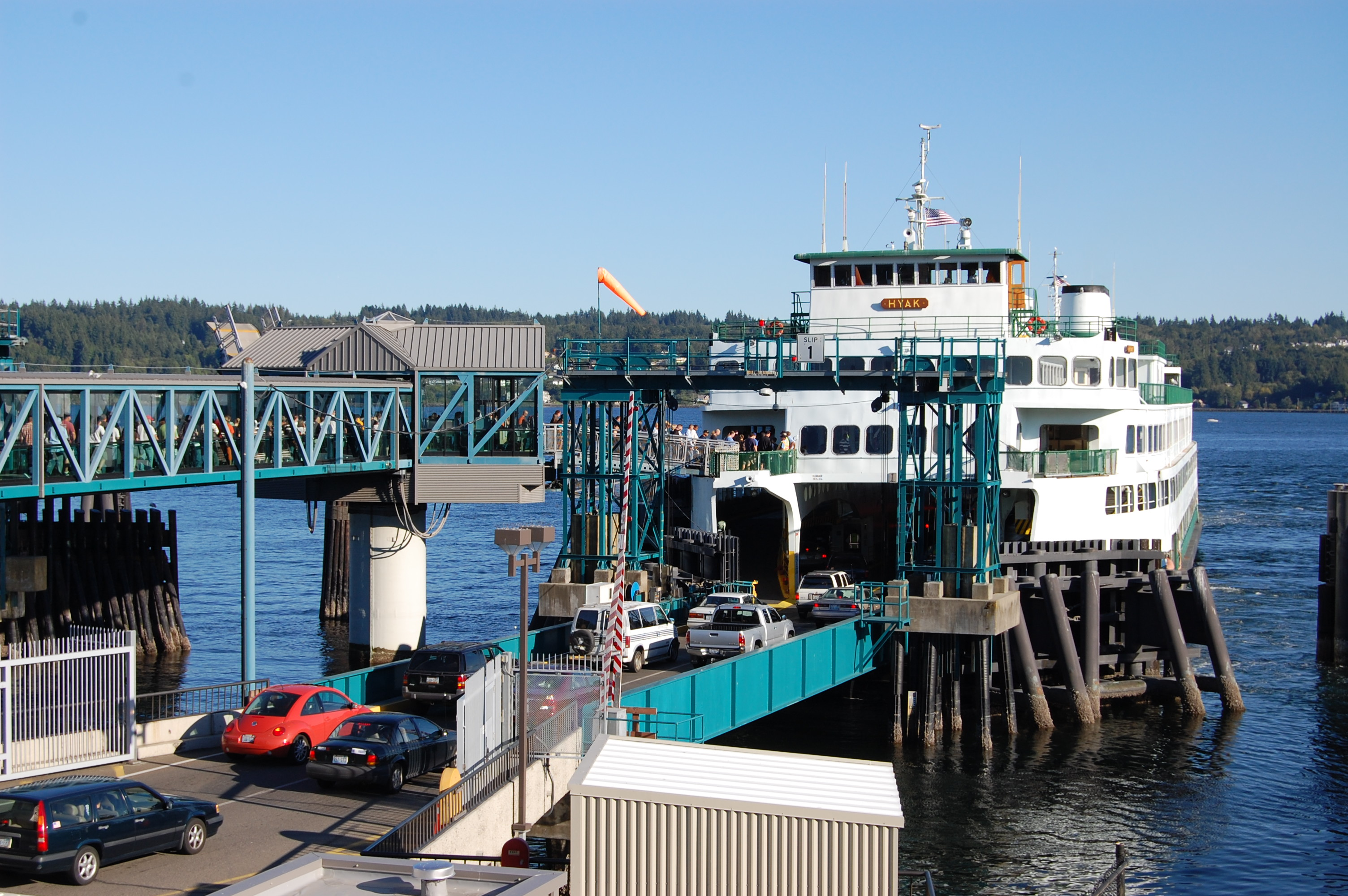
- Hyak boarding at Bremerton.
- Waterway: Puget Sound
- Route: Seattle – Bremerton, Washington
- Carries: SR 304
- Authority: Washington State Ferries (1951–present); Kitsap Fast Ferries (2017–present)
- Travel time: 60 minutes (2018); 45 minutes (1968)
- Connections at Bremerton
- Ship: Kitsap Foot Ferry
- Bus: Kitsap Transit, Mason Transit Authority
- Road: SR 304
- Connections at Seattle
- Ship: King County Water Taxi
- Tram: Pioneer Square station
- Bus: King County Metro, Sound Transit Express
- Road: SR 519
Route map
Ferry terminals on the Seattle–Bremerton route

The Seattle–Bremerton ferry is a ferry route across Puget Sound between Seattle and Bremerton, Washington. Since 1951, the route has primarily been operated by the state-run Washington State Ferries system, currently the largest ferry system in the United States. Kitsap Transit also runs passenger-only "fast ferries" service on the route.

== History ==
The Seattle–Bremerton ferry route was once known as the "Navy Yard route". Before ferry service, the route was served by steamships and steamboats, such as the Inland Flyer. The sternwheeler Bailey Gatzert, once considered one of the most prestigious vessels to operate on Puget Sound and the Columbia River, was converted to an automobile ferry and as such became the first ferry to run on the Seattle-Bremerton route. Another vessel to run on the route was the unique "streamlined" ferry Kalakala.

On December 17, 1973, the route's schedule was reduced from 18 daily sailings to 15, eliminating a previous clock-face schedule. Ridership from Bremerton declined by approximately 1 million passengers from 1978 to 1988. From 1986 to 2002, Washington State Ferries operated passenger-only service on the Bremerton route using specialized high-speed boats. After the service was cancelled, Kitsap Transit contracted with private companies to operate a similar service for several years, and later debuted its own service, Kitsap Fast Ferries, on July 10, 2017.

== Current status ==
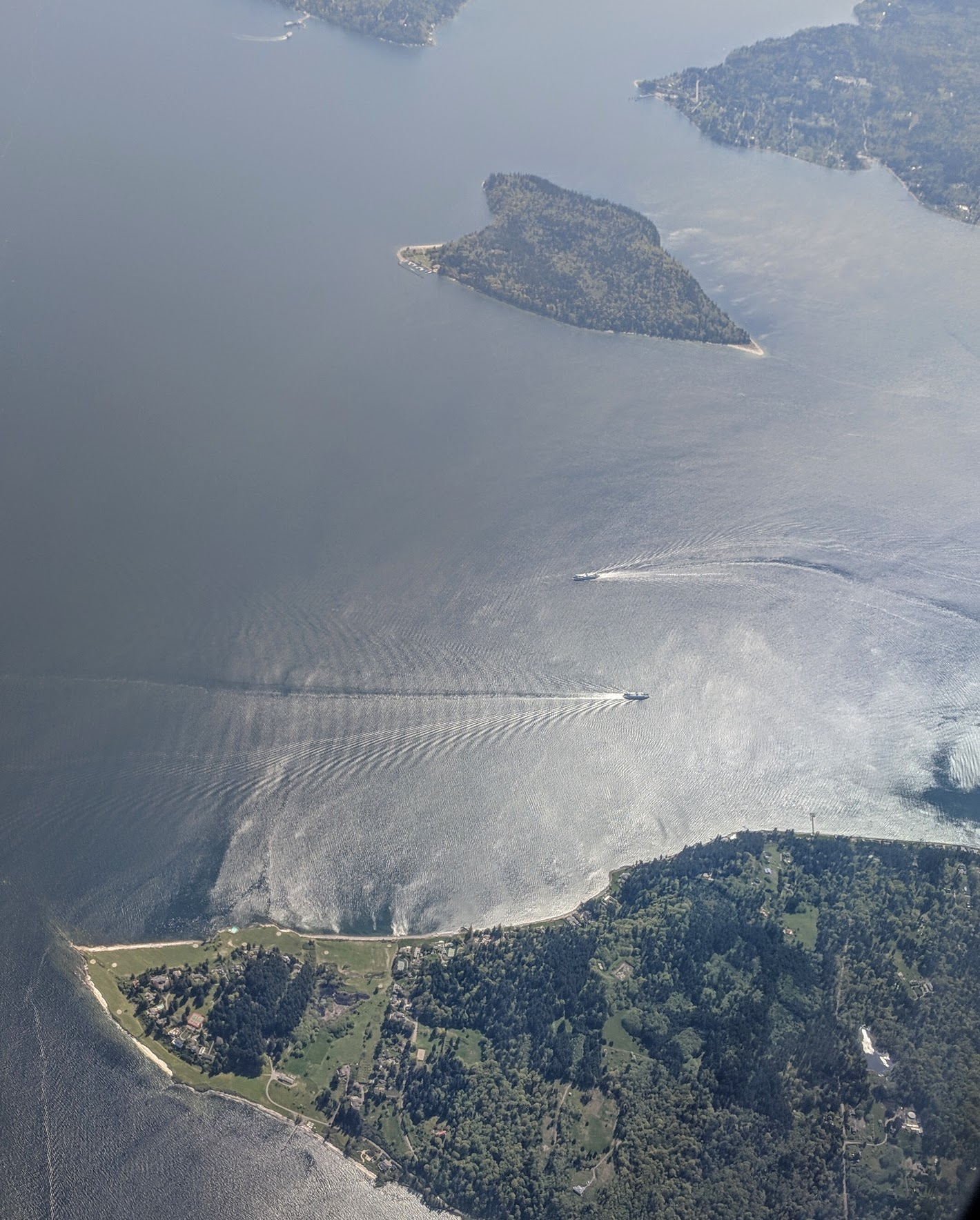
Aerial view of two Seattle–Bremerton ferries crossing near Fort Ward and Country Club of Seattle on Bainbridge Island

The route from Seattle departs from Colman Dock on the central Seattle waterfront. As of August 2025, the vessels normally assigned to the Seattle–Bremerton route are the Chimacum and Walla Walla.

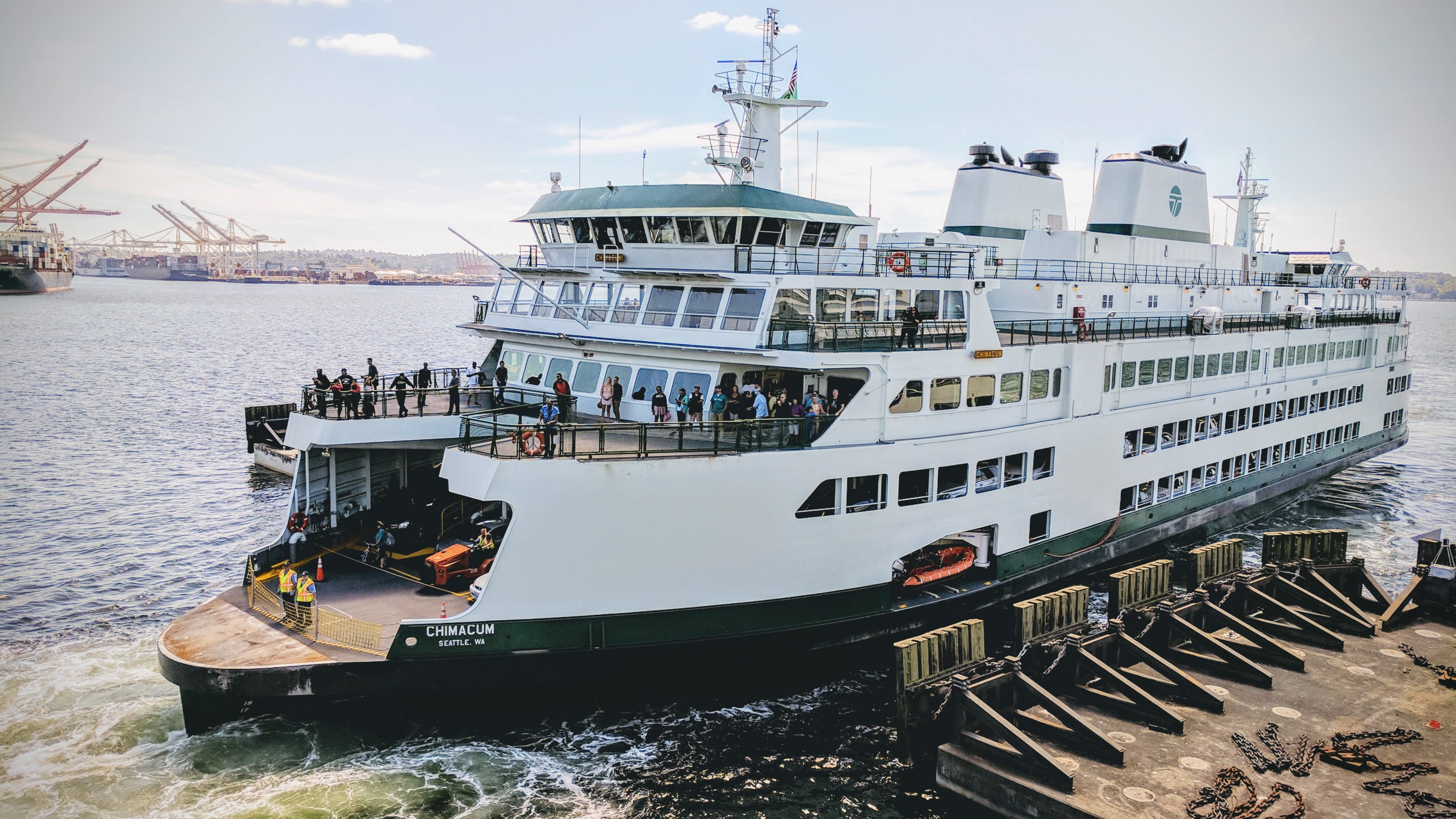
MV Chimacum, ferry on the Seattle–Bremerton route, arriving at Colman Dock in Seattle

== Popular culture ==
A ship (Klickitat) in this ferry route is mentioned in the Emergency! TV movie "Most Deadly Passage" that first aired in 1978.

== See also ==
- Ferries in Washington (state)
- Washington State Ferries
