= Kitsap Fast Ferries =

Passenger ferry system connecting Seattle to Kitsap County, Washington

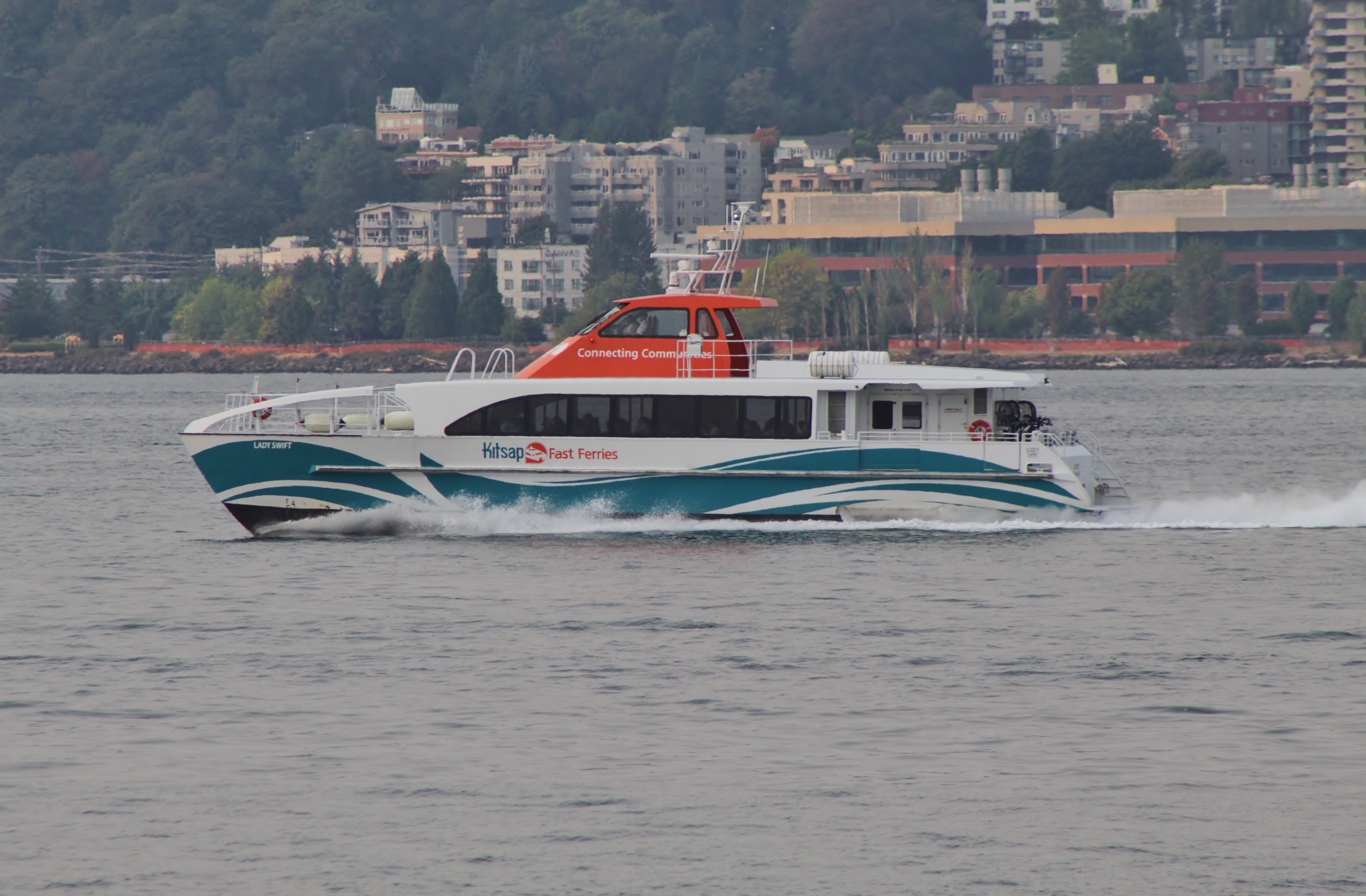
- M/V Lady Swift on Elliott Bay in Seattle
- Locale: Kitsap County, Washington
- Waterway: Puget Sound
- Transit type: Passenger ferry
- Operator: Kitsap Transit
- Began operation: July 10, 2017
- No. of lines: 3
- No. of vessels: 9
- No. of terminals: 4
- Yearly ridership: 1,187,800 (2025)
- Website: kitsaptransit.com/fastferry

Kitsap Fast Ferries is a passenger ferry service operating between Seattle and Kitsap County in the U.S. state of Washington. It is funded and operated by Kitsap Transit and began service in July 2017, with a single boat traveling between Seattle and Bremerton. A second route, from Seattle to Kingston, launched in November 2018, and a third route serving Seattle and Southworth began operating in March 2021. In 2025, the system had a ridership of 1,187,800.

The passenger-only ferry service, approved by voters in 2016, was preceded by one operated by Washington State Ferries between 1986 and 2003. This state-run system ceased operations after a class-action lawsuit forced its vessels to slow down when traveling through Rich Passage to reduce wake damage. Kitsap Transit briefly operated its own passenger ferries from 2004 to 2007, but failed to receive voter approval for two sales tax funding measures. The agency commissioned a low-wake vessel, Rich Passage 1, which was used from 2011 to 2012 for research and trial runs that determined it could operate at high speeds without creating a damaging wake.

== History ==
=== Earlier ferry services ===
During the late 19th century and early 20th century, the Puget Sound region was served by a variety of passenger steamship ferries known collectively as the "mosquito fleet". Some of these routes connected Kitsap County to docks in Seattle, eventually replaced by automobile-and-passenger ferry service operated by the Puget Sound Navigation Company, which became the state-operated Washington State Ferries system in 1951.

Washington State Ferries began exploring passenger-only ferry service between Seattle and Bremerton, Southworth and Vashon in the mid-1980s to help ease auto ferry traffic and quicken passenger commutes. A 400-passenger catamaran was leased from a private tour operator in 1985 for trial runs and began passenger service on October 15, 1986, serving the Seattle–Bremerton route. The $2.5 million ferry, known as the MV Express (later renamed MV Tyee), made the run in 38 minutes and averaged 28 to 29 miles per hour (45 to 47 km/h); though it failed to carry enough passengers to meet state expectations in its early months, it steadily grew to 22,000 monthly riders in 1989.

Operating funds for the ferry system, reliant on gas taxes raised by the state, were left out of the 1989 budget because of a dispute in the state government. As a result, the MV Tyee and two additional passenger-only ferries intended to serve Vashon Island were pulled from service in June 1989. The three ferries were loaned to the San Francisco Bay Area after the 1989 Loma Prieta earthquake left the San Francisco–Oakland Bay Bridge closed for repairs. In January 1990, the ferries returned to the Seattle area, and began regular passenger service on April 23, 1990.

By July 1990, however, the ferries were voluntarily slowed from 25 knots (46 km/h; 29 mph) to 12 knots (22 km/h; 14 mph) while passing through Sinclair Inlet and Rich Passage, on the approach to Bremerton, after shoreline residents complained of erosion and other damage from the wakes created by the faster ferries. The MV Chinook debuted in 1998 to replace the MV Tyee, incorporating a lightweight body and water-jet engines designed to create a smaller wake at high speeds. In March 1999, a group of 113 Rich Passage residents filed a class-action lawsuit against Washington State Ferries, seeking restitution for damaged waterfront properties that had been affected by wakes from the MV Chinook. An injunction from the King County Superior Court in July forced the ferries to slow to 12 knots (22 km/h; 14 mph) in Rich Passage, adding an extra 10 to 15 minutes to the Seattle–Bremerton run. In March 2000, the Washington State Supreme Court lifted the injunction, allowing the MV Chinook and sister vessel MV Snohomish to operate at high speeds by May. Washington State Ferries voluntarily slowed the two vessels to 12 knots (22 km/h; 14 mph) in October 2001, after concluding in an environmental study that the ferries were causing significant beach erosion in a small section of Rich Passage. The lawsuit was settled in April 2002, with the state paying $4.5 million and limiting ferry speeds to 16 knots (30 km/h; 18 mph).

The voter approval of Initiative 695 in 1999, which eliminated the motor vehicle excise tax used to fund ferry service, cut $93 million from the ferry system's budget by the end of 2001. Voter rejection of 2002's Referendum 51, which would have funded the replacement of car ferries with a gas tax, led the state to consider eliminating passenger-only service to Bremerton and Vashon Island to make up for the shortfall. In May 2003, the state legislature approved cuts to ferry service, including the elimination of passenger-only ferries. Passenger-only ferry service ceased operations on September 20, 2003, and the MV Chinook and MV Snohomish were sold in 2008 to Golden Gate Ferries in the San Francisco Bay Area after an unsuccessful auction on eBay.

=== Kitsap Transit trials ===
Prior to the cessation of passenger-only service in 2003, the state legislature passed a bill allowing non-state entities to operate their own public or private ferries near Washington State Ferries routes. Kitsap Transit, a public transit agency serving Kitsap County with bus service, decided to place a 0.3 percent sales tax increase and motor vehicle excise tax on the November 2003 ballot to fund a passenger-only ferry service to replace the state-run ferries. The ballot measure was rejected by 61 percent of voters, with support mostly coming from Bainbridge Island, downtown Bremerton, and Kingston.

Kitsap Transit instead partnered with private operators the following year, launching a Seattle–Bremerton route operated by Kitsap Ferry Company in August 2004. The new ferry service, traveling 40 minutes between the two terminals, struggled to attract riders in its early months, but grew from 200 daily passengers to 500 by the following May. Under the agreement, Kitsap Transit leased the ferry for $32,000 per month and paid for docking fees and fuel with local and federal grants.

The private ferry struggled to operate at a profit, leading Kitsap Transit to consider a new ballot measure to fund a public passenger-only ferry service. A 0.3 percent sales tax was placed on the February 6, 2007, ballot, and was rejected by 54.5 percent of voters. As a result, Kitsap Transit pulled its funding for the private Kitsap Ferry Company, and the company suspended service on March 30, 2007. Another private operator, Aqua Express, had already ceased operations of a passenger-only service from Kingston to Seattle after a few months in 2005 due to poor ridership and increasing fuel costs.

As part of the study, Kitsap Transit commissioned the construction of a $5.3 million, foil-assisted catamaran designed for low wakes, in 2009. The 118-passenger, 78-foot-long (24 m) vessel, named Rich Passage 1, was built in Bellingham by All American Marine and uses a lightweight composite body and hydrofoil to reduce weight and minimize wake. During the vessel's sea trials near Bellingham in 2010, it lost its hydrofoil during high-speed operation, setting the project back until a new hydrofoil was rebuilt in 2011. Testing in Kitsap County began in October 2011, and a passenger service trial was conducted in summer 2012. Rich Passage 1 performed 35-minute crossings between Bremerton and Seattle, traveling through Rich Passage at 38 knots (70 km/h; 44 mph) and the rest of the route at 27 knots (50 km/h; 31 mph) to reduce fuel consumption; the vessel reportedly created a wake "half that" from a larger automobile ferry and was found to have successfully operated without damaging beaches and bulkheads during full-speed tests. The passenger service did not attract expected ridership, blamed on the $7 fare without monthly passes, leading Kitsap Transit to consider a sales tax to subsidize service.

Operating costs for Rich Passage 1 were funded by federal grants as part of the study, but expired at the end of the passenger service trial in 2012. As a result, the vessel spent several years in out-of-water storage, with the exception of infill trips for Washington State Ferries routes and periodic test runs. During one of the infill trips, the ferry ran aground near Port Hadlock in January 2013, and was later damaged by a small fire while in storage in Port Townsend.

=== Ballot measure and service ===
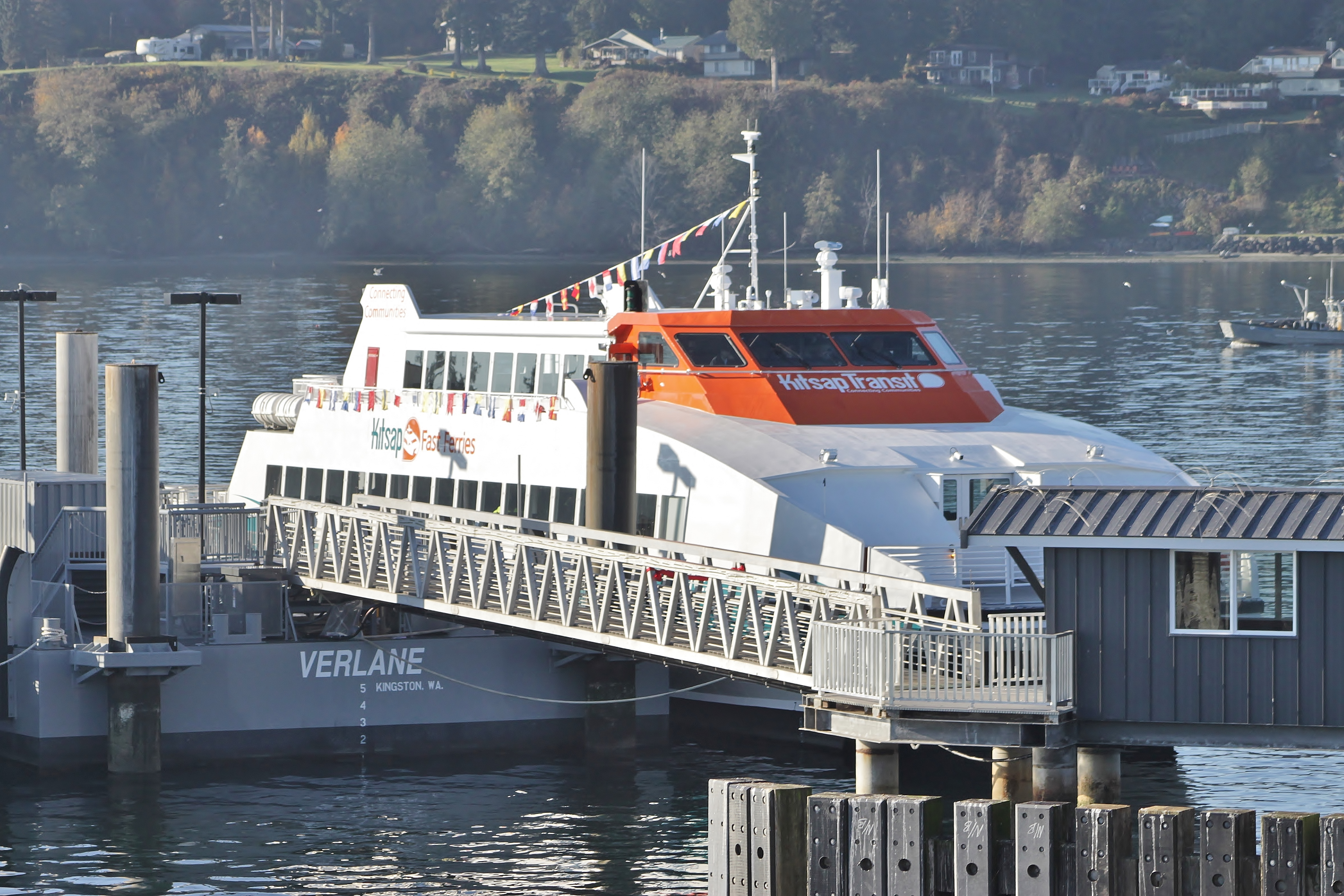
M/V Finest at the Kingston ferry terminal, 2018

In 2015, Kitsap Transit drafted a business plan for a "fast ferry" system serving Bremerton, Kingston, and Southworth from Seattle, funded by a local sales tax and fares. The Kitsap Transit board voted in April 2016 to place a 0.3 percent sales tax on the November 2016 ballot that would fund a three-route passenger-only ferry system to begin operation in 2017. The ballot measure, the third overall on passenger-only ferries in Kitsap County, was approved by 51.7 percent of voters on November 8, 2016, with the collection of sales taxes to begin the following April. In June 2017, Kitsap Transit finalized its operating plans, including a revision to initially operate the system itself as it continues to negotiate an operating contract with the King County Department of Transportation, and announced that service would begin on July 10, 2017.

Kitsap Fast Ferries service began on July 10, 2017, and fares were waived for the rest of the month. Due to multiple and repeated issues with Rich Passage 1 in its first six months of service, causing delays or cancellations to ferry trips, Kitsap Transit began negotiations with King County to lease Spirit of Kingston as a backup vessel. The Spirit of Kingston entered service in March during a week-long repair of Rich Passage 1, but was recalled by King County for use on the West Seattle Water Taxi.

The Kingston route began service on November 26, 2018, using MV Finest, a former NY Waterway catamaran acquired and refurbished by Kitsap Transit earlier in the year. MV Melissa Ann was announced as the route's backup vessel. Two new bus routes also launched to connect the Kingston ferry terminal to park and rides in Poulsbo and Suquamish, as well as an on-demand service.

The Southworth route began service on March 29, 2021, having been delayed several months due to the COVID-19 pandemic. The MV Enetai was commissioned to operate the route with capacity for 255 passengers. The Southworth terminal shares the existing one-slip facility used by Washington State Ferries, with coordinated departure times around ferry runs.

=== Future plans ===
In March 2023, Kitsap Transit selected Pier 48 as their preferred site for a new passenger ferry terminal in Downtown Seattle due to expected overcrowding of the existing Pier 50 facility shared with the King County Water Taxi. The site is south of Colman Dock and Pier 50 and was formerly used by Washington State Ferries as overflow for vehicles queueing.

An electric hydrofoil ferry is planned to be tested on the Bremerton route in the 2020s as part of a Kitsap Transit research program funded by the Federal Transit Administration. In 2024, the state government contributed $5.2 million towards construction of a 150-passenger hydrofoil ferry that would be designed by two local firms. As of 2025, the pilot project's 20-passenger prototype has $15 million that remains to be funded.

== Service ==
The Bremerton–Seattle route began service on July 10, 2017. It was followed by the Kingston route in November 2018 and the Southworth route in March 2021. All three routes charge a $2 eastbound fare and $10 westbound fare, offering monthly passes and PugetPasses for frequent passengers; reduced fare passengers are charged a $1 eastbound fare and $5 westbound fare. The regional ORCA card is accepted to pay one-way fares, along with exact cash and tokens. The routes generally run during peak periods on weekdays and have additional trips on Saturdays during the summer season to cover gaps in Washington State Ferries sailings. Saturday service between October and April was suspended in 2025. The additional runs, which were added in 2021 to compensate for a lack of state ferry service, are planned to continue through the 2026 FIFA World Cup with funding from the state government.

The Bremerton–Seattle route uses an online reservation system that is able to book up to 88 of the 118 seats on a given trip, with walk-ons to fill the rest of the seats. The route makes six daily round trips on weekdays and ten round trips on Saturdays, with no trips on Sundays. The journey takes an estimated 28 minutes, with an additional seven minutes for unloading and loading at each terminal.

As part of the launch of fast ferry service in 2017, Kitsap Transit introduced new express bus service to the Bremerton terminal that is timed to ferry departures and arrivals. The routes connect Bremerton to Silverdale, Poulsbo, and East Bremerton. Similar routes, including on-demand service, were also launched alongside the Kingston and Southworth fast ferries.

=== Routes ===
Kitsap Fast Ferries routes
| Route | Opened | Travel time | Termini | | Ridership (2024) |
| Route | Opened | Travel time | Western | Eastern | Ridership (2024) |
|---|---|---|---|---|---|
| Bremerton–Seattle | July 10, 2017 | 30 minutes | Bremerton Transportation Center | Colman Dock (Pier 50) | 563,833 |
| Kingston–Seattle | November 26, 2018 | 40 minutes | Kingston ferry terminal | Colman Dock (Pier 50) | 113,390 |
| Southworth–Seattle | March 29, 2021 | 26 minutes | Southworth ferry terminal | Colman Dock (Pier 50) | 374,336 |

== Vessels ==
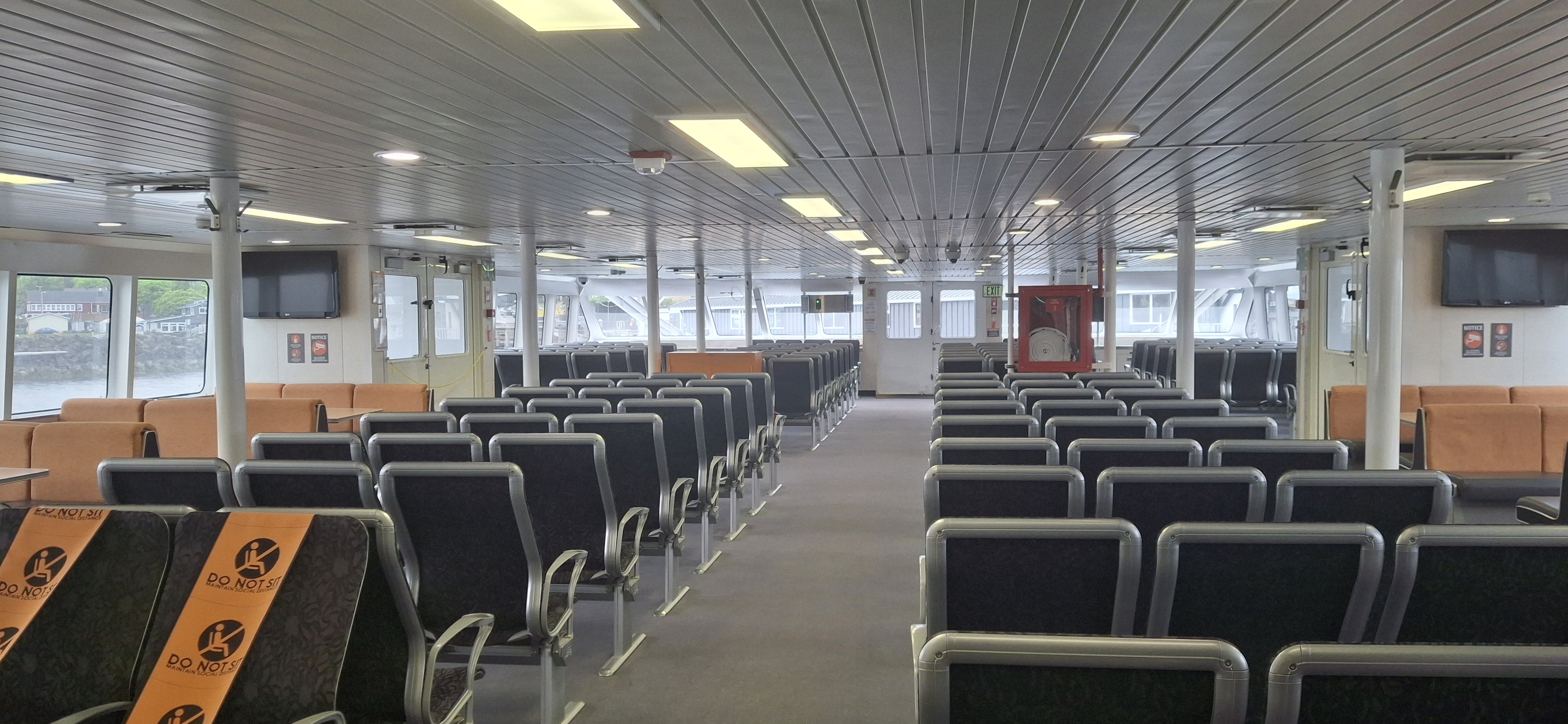
Passenger cabin of MV Solano

Fast Ferries service began initially with a single boat, the 118-passenger Rich Passage 1, in 2017. The vessel is a catamaran designed to create a very low wake while operating at high speeds by employing a special foil. A second boat of a similar design, MV Reliance, was delivered in April 2019 and is planned to serve as a backup for the Bremerton route. The Reliance features the same hydrofoil design as Rich Passage 1, but was built lighter and with a less powerful engine to comply with federal emissions standards. As of October 2016, the agency's plans called for the purchase of a 150-passenger catamaran for delivery in 2018, two 250-passenger bow loading catamarans for delivery in 2020 and 2021, and an additional 118-passenger high-speed, low-wake catamaran to be delivered in 2022.

In 2017, Kitsap Transit purchased MV Finest, a 350-passenger ferry from NY Waterway. The ferry was purchased and refurbished at a cost of $7.5 million at a shipyard on Whidbey Island and delivered to the agency in October 2018. The ferry entered service in November 2018 on the Kingston route. M/V Melissa Ann was leased as a backup vessel for M/V Finest on the Kingston run. In February 2018, the agency ordered the two planned low-wake catamarans from All American Marine at a cost of $15 million. The new Rich Passage-class vessels, with quieter exhaust and HVAC systems, are expected to be delivered in early 2019 and operate on the Bremerton route. The new vessels will be named after old Mosquito Fleet ships, including the Lady Swift, Illahee, Manette, Commander, Reliance, and Waterman. MV Waterman, built in 2019, is the first hybrid ferry to be used in Puget Sound and has 150 seats. In December 2018, the agency ordered two front-loading, 250-passenger vessels from Nichols Brothers Boat Builders for use on the Kingston and Southworth routes. Kitsap Transit took delivery of the two vessels, named Enetai and Commander, in 2020 and 2021.

=== Current fleet ===
Current fleet of Kitsap Fast Ferries
| Name | Image | Year built | Capacity | Length | Top speed (knots) | Notes |
|---|---|---|---|---|---|---|
| MV Rich Passage 1 | An image of M/V Rich Passage I near Bremerton, Washington, U.S. | 2011 | 118 | 72 ft (22 m) | 38 kn (70 km/h; 44 mph) | |
| MV Reliance | M/V Reliance departing Bremerton heading towards Seattle. | 2019 | 118 | 75 ft (23 m) | 37 kn (69 km/h; 43 mph) | |
| MV Finest | | 1996 | 349 | 114 ft (35 m) | 32 kn (59 km/h; 37 mph) | Acquired in 2018 |
| MV Lady Swift | | 2019 | 118 | 75 ft (23 m) | 37 kn (69 km/h; 43 mph) | |
| MV Enetai | | 2020 | 250 | 128 ft (39 m) | 37 kn (69 km/h; 43 mph) | Bow-loading design |
| MV Commander | | 2021 | 250 | 128 ft (39 m) | 37 kn (69 km/h; 43 mph) | Bow-loading design |
| MV Solano | | 2004 | 350 | 126 ft (38 m) | 32 kn (59 km/h; 37 mph) | Acquired in 2021 |

=== Former vessels ===
- MV Melissa Ann (2018–2022)
