= MV Rachel Marie =

Ferry between Skagway and Haines Borough

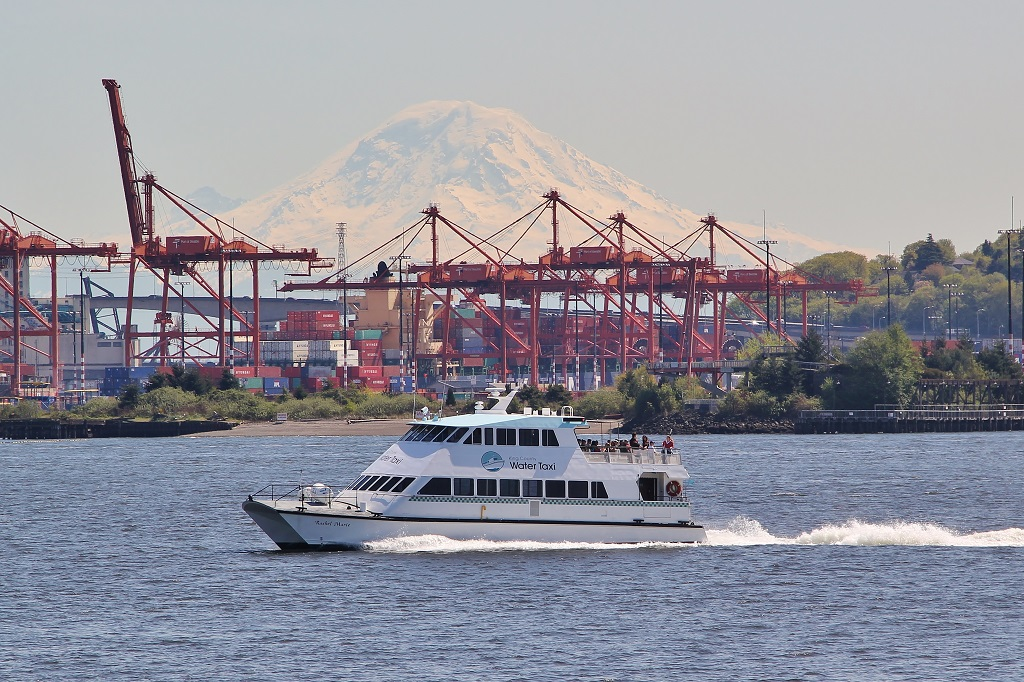
- The Rachel Marie in Eliott Bay on the Downtown Seattle-West Seattle route with Mount Rainier in the background in May 2013.

General characteristics
- Type: Catamaran passenger ferry
- Length: 77 ft (23.5 m)
- Beam: 29 ft (8.8 m)
- Draft: 5 ft (1.5 m)
- Decks: 2
- Installed power: 2 x 900 HP
- Speed: 24 kn
- Capacity: 172 passengers
- Crew: 3

Rachel Marie is a 77-foot (23 m), 172 passenger-only ferry operating between Skagway and Haines Borough, Alaska.She is owned by Four Seasons Marine and part of the Haines Skagway Fast Ferry fleet.

== History ==
Rachel Marie was built in 1988 along with her sister Melissa Ann at Nichols Boat Builders in Freeland, Washington for the United States Army. She was later sold to Four Seasons Marie which leased the vessel to Kitsap Transit for a Passenger-Only ferry route between Seattle and Bremerton.

From April 2010 and on, she was operated by the King County Ferry District on the Downtown Seattle to West Seattle route as part of the King County Water Taxi. The route runs all day from April to October each year and in Peak Hours only for the rest of the year. On May 18, 2013, she was replaced by the Spirit of Kingston on the Downtown Seattle to West Seattle route.

== Technical Information ==
The Rachel Marie has a catamaran hull and uses two 900 horsepower propulsion engines to cruise at an average speed of 24 knots. The vessel also is equipped with two radar systems, a GPS plotter, a depth sounder, and an automated information system transponder.
