= MV Melissa Ann =

Passenger-only ferry

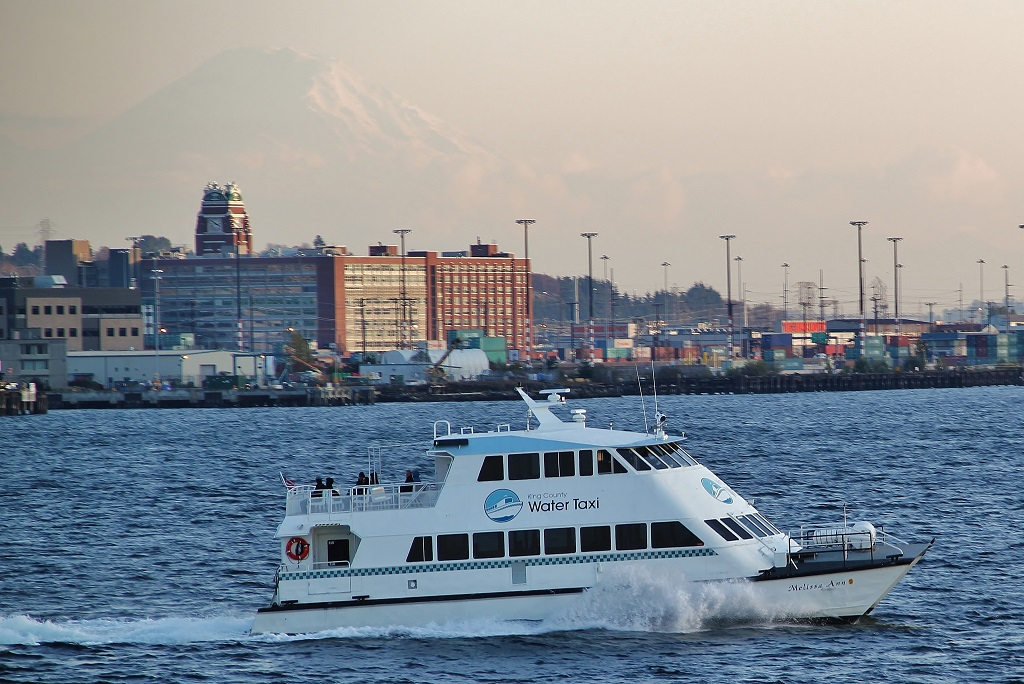
- The Melissa Ann in Eliott Bay on the Downtown Seattle-West Seattle route with Mount Rainier in the background on November 9, 2012

General characteristics
- Type: Catamaran passenger ferry
- Length: 77 ft (23.5 m)
- Beam: 29 ft (8.8 m)
- Draft: 5 ft (1.5 m)
- Decks: 2
- Installed power: 2 x 1400 HP
- Speed: 28 kn
- Capacity: 172 passengers
- Crew: 3

MV Melissa Ann is a 77-foot (23 m), 172 passenger passenger-only ferry owned by Four Seasons Marine and operated by Kitsap Transit as part of the Kitsap Fast Ferries fleet.

== History ==
The Melissa Ann was built in 1988 along with her sister Rachel Marie at Nichols Boat Builders in Freeland, Washington for the United States Army. She was later sold to Four Seasons Marine which leased the vessel for various passenger-only ferry services, including to Kitsap Transit for a passenger-only ferry route between Seattle and Bremerton and to the city of Honolulu for a passenger-only ferry route serving Oahu.

From October 2009 through 2015, she was operated by the King County Ferry District (later the King County Department of Transportation Marine Division) on the Downtown Seattle to Vashon Island route as part of the King County Water Taxi. In 2018, the ferry was leased by Kitsap Transit again, this time as a backup vessel for the Seattle-Kingston Fast Ferry route, before being returned to Four Seasons Marine in 2022.

The Melissa Ann was moved to Southern California to be operated on a Santa Catalina Island–Newport Beach route.

== Technical information ==
The Melissa Ann has a catamaran hull and uses two 1,400 horsepower propulsion engines to cruise at an average speed of 28 knots. The vessel also is equipped with two radar systems, a GPS plotter, a depth sounder, and an automated information system transponder.
