= King County Water Taxi =

Passenger ferry service in King County, Washington

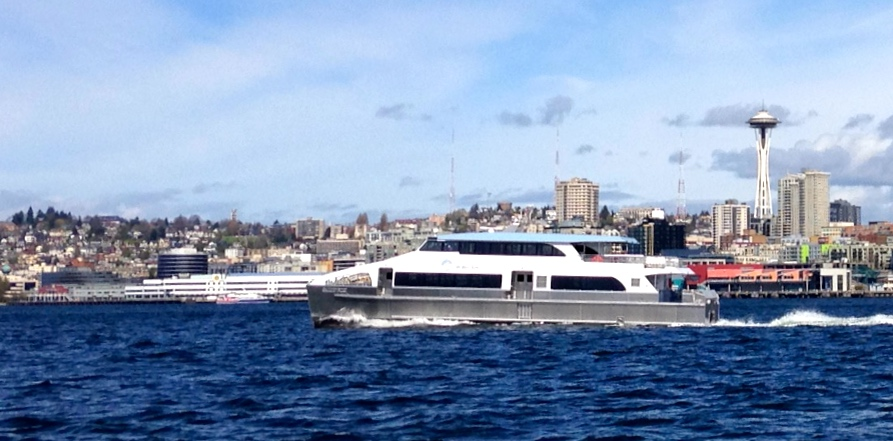
- MV Sally Fox on the Vashon/Downtown Seattle route
- Locale: King County, Washington, U.S.
- Waterway: Puget Sound
- Transit type: Water taxi
- Owner: King County
- Operator: King County Metro Transit Department, Marine Division
- Began operation: 1997
- System length: Vashon Island: 10 mi (16 km); West Seattle: 2 mi (3.2 km)
- No. of lines: 2
- No. of vessels: 3
- No. of terminals: 3
- Daily ridership: 1,093 (September 2024–March 2025)
- Website: kingcounty.gov

The King County Water Taxi is a passenger ferry service that operates two routes on Puget Sound in Seattle, Washington, United States. It is based out of the Colman Dock ferry complex in Downtown Seattle with service to West Seattle and Vashon Island. The system has three catamaran vessels and is operated by the King County Metro Transit Department, Marine Division.

The county government began operating passenger ferries in 1997 with the Elliott Bay Water Taxi, which ran from West Seattle to Downtown Seattle. A special-purpose district, named the King County Ferry District, was formed in 2007 to take over the West Seattle route and prepare for the transfer of the passenger-only Vashon Island run from Washington State Ferries, which was completed in 2009. The ferry district was dissolved in 2015 and merged into the county government; since 2019, the water taxi system has been operated by the King County Metro Transit Department, Marine Division.

== History ==
=== Early ferries of Puget Sound ===
West Seattle is the oldest neighborhood and the birthplace of the city of Seattle. It is surrounded on three sides by water and has both enjoyed and suffered its isolation from the "mainland" of downtown Seattle.

Between 1850 and 1930, hundreds of small, steam-powered ferries called the Mosquito Fleet carried travelers to and from numerous islands and peninsulas in the Puget Sound area, including West Seattle and Vashon Island.

The first licensed ferry in the Seattle area launched on December 24, 1888, traveled from Seacrest Park in West Seattle to downtown Seattle, as well as other water-bound location throughout the Puget Sound. It was a steam-powered sidewheel ship named the City of Seattle and made two trips a day, carrying West Seattle homesteaders east to the city, and weekend vacationers west to the beachfront. The King County government operated ferries to Vashon Island and West Seattle from Downtown Seattle from 1917 to 1922. The entire fleet was then leased to John L. Anderson. The West Seattle service was discontinued when the first bridge across the Duwamish River was built.

Over on Vashon Island, the passenger-only ferries were discontinued as the Mosquito Fleet faced increasing competition from the diesel-powered auto ferries. Vashon Island residents could now drive their vehicles onto a ferry to the Fauntleroy terminal in West Seattle.

Over time, a succession of bridges was installed to connect the West Seattle peninsula to downtown proper, beginning with the old wood-and-rail Spokane Street bridge in 1920. In 1970, calls for a modern solution brought attention to the growing problem of commuting to downtown; in 1978, the freighter ship Chavez crashed into the lower bridge spurring the city to build the high-level West Seattle Bridge and the low-level Spokane Street Bridge that are still the primary paths into and out of peninsula today. As West Seattle has grown in popularity, travel in and out of the peninsula has become more congested.

=== Elliott Bay Water Taxi ===
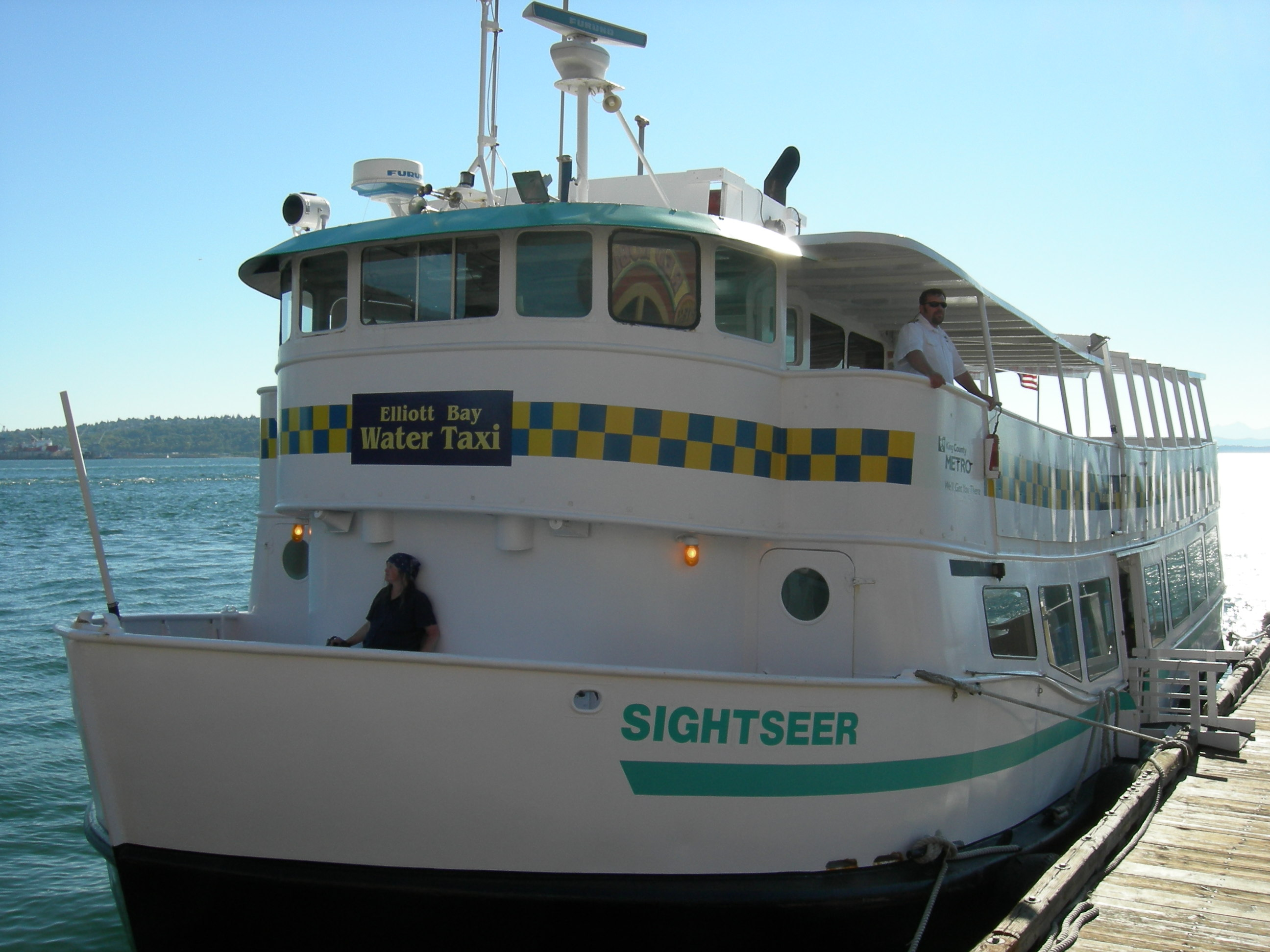
The Sightseer served as the second Elliott Bay Water Taxi.

The Elliott Bay Water Taxi started service in 1997 as a pilot project to give commuters an alternative to the congested West Seattle Bridge and Highway 99. The Water Taxi was operated by King County and only ran between April and October. King County leased the M/V Admiral Pete from Kitsap Harbor Tours (via Argosy Cruises) and later the M/V Sightseer from Argosy Cruises to operate the service. The vessel was only capable of traveling 8 knots, but the slow speeds proved popular with both commuters and tourists. The ferry quickly became a popular tourist attraction due to the view of the Seattle skyline as the vessel crosses Elliott Bay, the short walk to Alki Beach and the restaurants in West Seattle.

=== Vashon passenger-only ferry ===
The passenger-only ferry service between Vashon Island and Downtown Seattle started as a service of the Washington State Ferries in the early 1990s. The ferries proved popular with commuters as they offered a much faster connection to downtown Seattle than the alternative of taking the auto ferry to Fauntleroy and driving or taking transit to downtown. In 2006, the state legislature ordered Washington State Ferries to discontinue all passenger-only ferry services, but simultaneously enabled local authorities to form Ferry Districts with tax-collecting authority. The last run operated by the Washington State Ferries vessels came in September 2009.

=== King County Ferry District ===
In April 2007 the county formed the special-purpose King County Ferry District to take over operations of both the West Seattle and Vashon Island passenger-only ferries. The district is funded through a property tax levied on all property in the county. The ferry district took over operation of the West Seattle/Downtown Seattle route from King County on April 27, 2008.

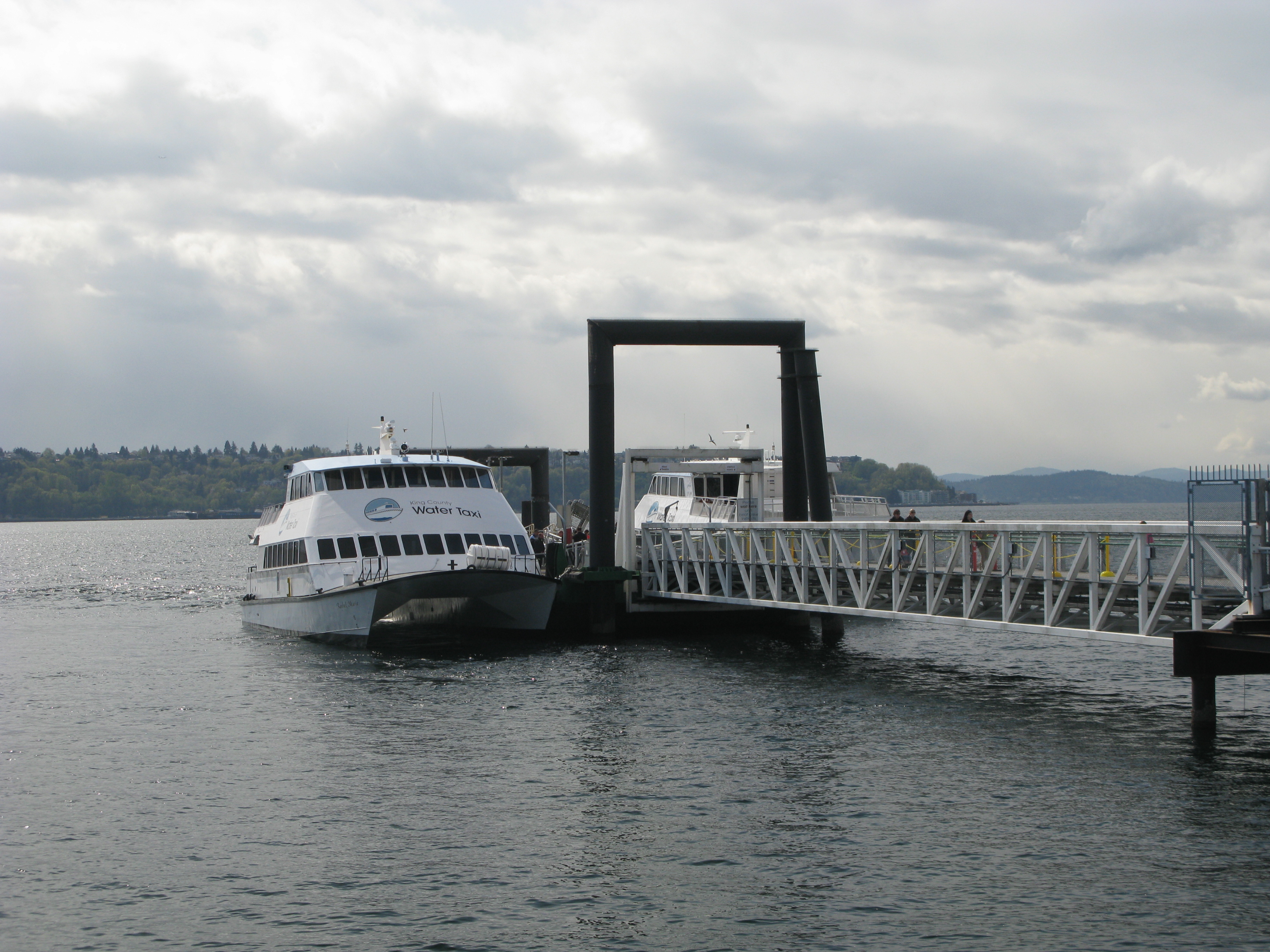
King County Water Taxi at Seattle's Pier 50 in 2010

In April 2009, the West Seattle route was renamed from the Elliott Bay Water Taxi to the King County Water Taxi. Later that year, on September 28, 2009, the Vashon Island/Downtown Seattle route was transferred from Washington State Ferries and became the second King County Water Taxi Route. King County Ferry District leased the catamaran MV Melissa Ann from Four Seasons Marine Services to operate the Vashon Island route. In addition to being more stable, the catamaran was also faster than the ships operated by the Washington State Ferries reducing travel time from 30 to 22 minutes.

In April 2010, the West Seattle route began operating year-round service from a newly rebuilt dock at Seacrest Park that allowed for wheelchair access. At the same time the West Seattle route started operating with the catamaran MV Rachel Marie (a sister ship of the Melissa Ann), also leased from Four Seasons Marine Services. The leased Sightseer was returned to Argosy Cruises.

In March 2013, the District added a third vessel to its fleet by acquiring the MV Spirit of Kingston that had been previously used on the failed SoundRunner ferry between Kingston and Downtown Seattle. The Spirit of Kingston is the first vessel to be owned by the ferry district. It was assigned to the West Seattle route where its smaller size, and more efficient engines proved a better fit than the Rachel Marie. The new vessel allowed the Rachel Marie to serve as a backup, saving the district on rental and lease expenses.

In 2014, the district received federal grants that allowed it to purchase two ships specifically designed for the needs of the King County Water Taxi.

=== King County Department of Transportation ===
In late 2014 the King County Council (made up of the same members as the King County Ferry District) voted to assume governance of the King County Ferry District. The consolidation of the district into county government saves money by eliminating redundant functions.

As of January 1, 2015, the King County Ferry District ceased to exist, and the King County Water Taxi became a service of the Marine Division of the King County Department of Transportation.

December 2014 saw the arrival of the first new vessel for the King County Water Taxi, the MV Sally Fox. After undergoing tests, the new ferry was placed into service on the Vashon Island/Downtown Seattle route on April 8, 2015. The addition of the Sally Fox to the fleet allowed the leased Rachel Marie to be returned to Four Seasons Marine Services in December 2014.

The second new vessel, the MV Doc Maynard was delivered in October 2015 and after modifications were made to the dock at Seacrest Park, the new ship began service on the West Seattle/Downtown Seattle route on January 7, 2016. The arrival of the Doc Maynard allowed the Spirit of Kingston to become the backup ship for King County and allowed the leased Melissa Ann to be returned to Four Seasons Marine Services in November 2015.

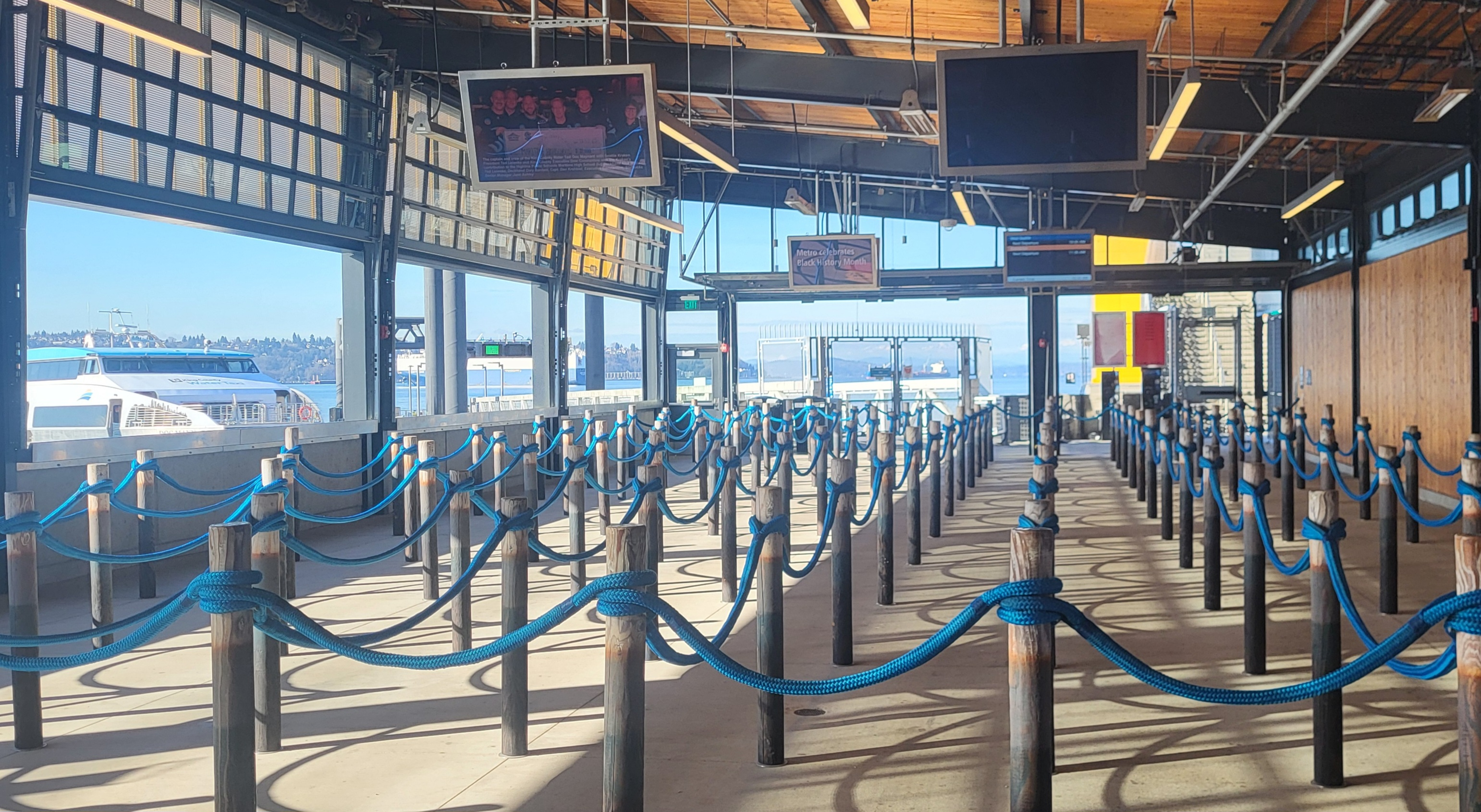
The interior of the 2019 Pier 50 passenger ferry terminal.

A new passenger ferry terminal at Colman Dock opened on August 13, 2019, to serve the King County Water Taxi and Kitsap Fast Ferries at Pier 50. For two years, passenger ferries were diverted to a temporary terminal to the north at Pier 52 while the old dock was demolished.

On January 1, 2019, King County Department of Transportation was dissolved and the Metro Transit Division became its own department, King County Metro Transit Department. The Marine Division is now part of the Metro Transit Department.

On November 2, 2023, the captain and crew of the Doc Maynard spotted a runaway container ship that was floating adrift towards the Seattle Aquarium. They used the ferry to push the barge away from the waterfront, taking no damage and only falling 15 minutes behind in taxi operations. The captain and crew were later honored by the King County Council and Seattle Kraken.

== Routes ==
=== West Seattle–Seattle ===
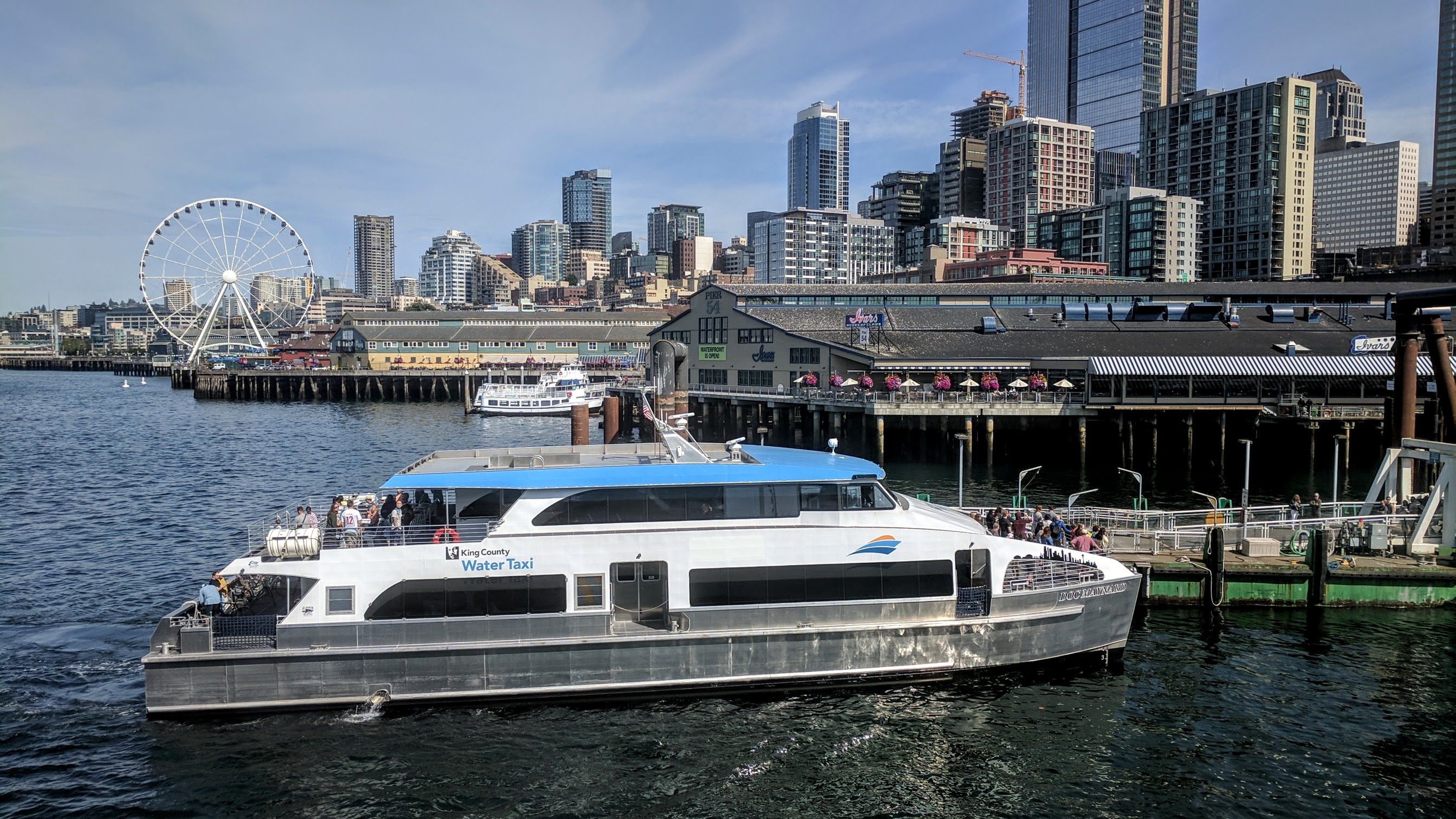
The MV Doc Maynard at the new (as of August 2017) temporary King County Water Taxi terminal at Pier 52, on the north side of the Seattle Ferry Terminal. This boat serves the West Seattle–Seattle route.

The West Seattle–Seattle route crosses Elliott Bay between Pier 50 on the downtown Seattle waterfront and Seacrest Park in West Seattle. The ferry's crossing time is approximately ten minutes during weekday commute hours and approximately 15 minutes at all other times. As of January 2016, the primary ferry for the route is the MV Doc Maynard.

The ferry operates year-round, and carried an average of 1,742 passengers during the commute hours in December 2014. Prior to 2021, the route only operated during peak commuter times on weekdays with limited seasonal service on weekends. In September 2021, due to construction on the West Seattle High Bridge, service was expanded to include midday sailings as part of a pilot program. The program continued in 2022 and was made permanent on October 16, 2023, alongside year-round weekend service.

King County Metro operates two shuttle bus routes that take passengers to and from the dock at Seacrest Park. Route 773 connects to the West Seattle Junction and route 775 connects to the Admiral District and Alki Beach.

=== Vashon Island–Seattle ===
The Vashon Island–Seattle route operates commuter service between Pier 50 on the downtown Seattle waterfront and Vashon Island. There are ten sailings in either direction every weekday, with most during the morning and evening peak periods. Each crossing takes approximately 22 minutes. The primary ferry for the route is MV Sally Fox, which carries an average of 400 passengers per day in each direction and was named for a Vashon activist. In 2023, the Vashon route carried 85,040 total passengers—an average of 341 per weekday.

The Vashon Island Ferry Terminal is also served by Washington State Ferries routes to Southworth in Kitsap County and the Fauntleroy terminal in West Seattle. Connecting services include King County Metro bus routes 118 and 119, which traverse Vashon and Maury islands. The route initially was peak-only with 12 round trips, but gained four mid-day rounds trips in 2024 with funding from the state legislature's supplemental transportation budget to compensate for reduced two-boat service on the Southworth–Vashon–Fauntleory ferry.

== Fares ==
As of September 1, 2022, the one-way fares for the King County Water Taxi are:

Fare type		West Seattle	Vashon Island
Adult	Cash or TVM Ticket	$5.75	$6.75
Adult	ORCA	$5.00	$5.75
Senior (65+) / Disabled / Medicare (Regional Reduced Fare Permit required)		$2.50	$3.00
Youth (0 to 18 years)		Free	Free
Low income (ORCA LIFT card required)		$3.75	$4.50

Crew members accept ORCA with a hand-held card reader, or passengers can pay with cash (no change given) or a pre-purchased tickets at the farebox on the vessel. Tickets can be purchased with credit or debit cards at vending machines located at each water taxi terminal.

== Fleet ==
- The Sally Fox was delivered in December 2014 and is assigned to the Vashon Island/Downtown Seattle route.
- The Doc Maynard was delivered in October 2015 and is regularly assigned to the West Seattle/Downtown Seattle route and serves as the backup vessel on the Vashon Island/Downtown Seattle route.
- The Spirit of Kingston was acquired in March 2013 and serves as the backup vessel on the West Seattle/Downtown Seattle route.
