= MV Finest =

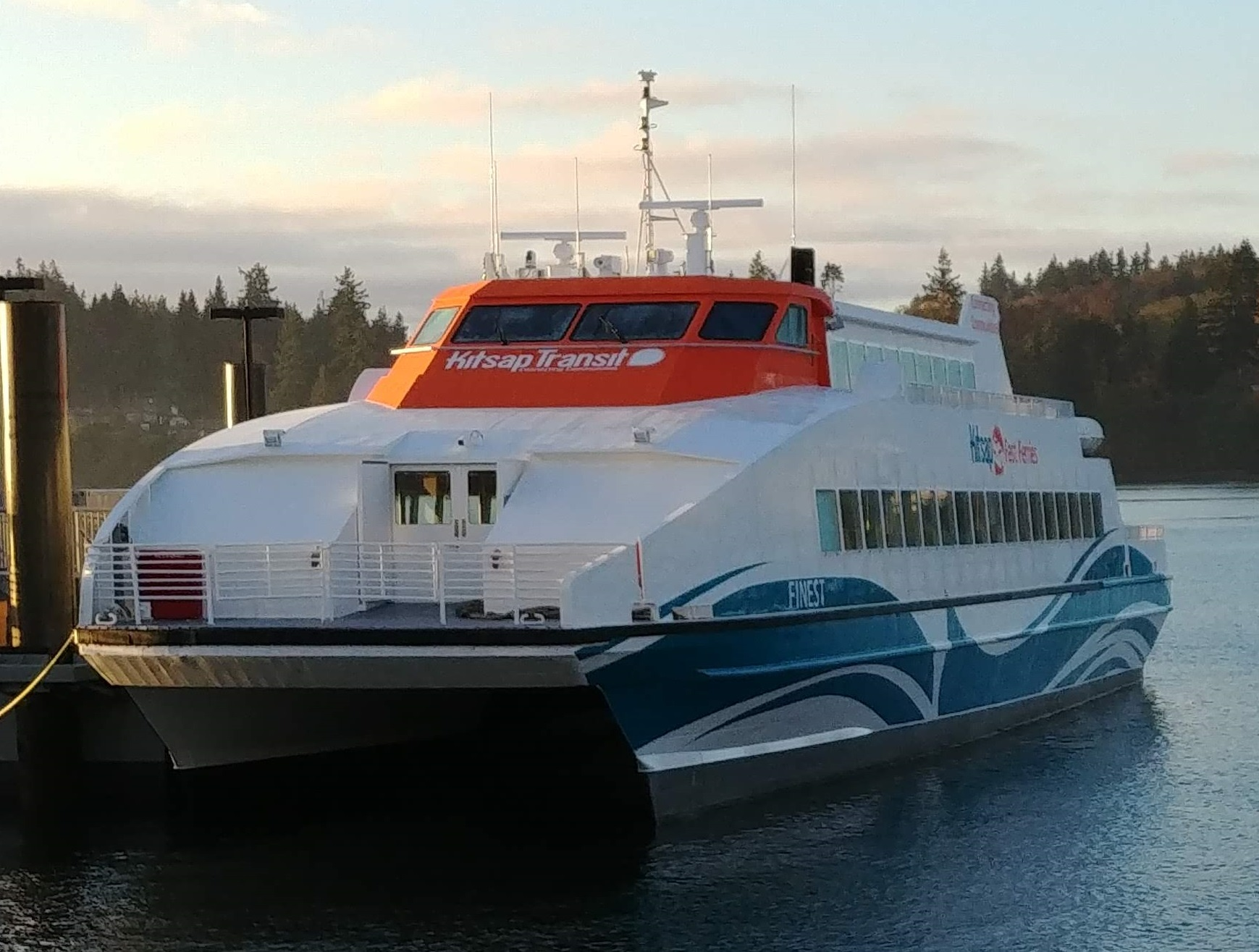
- MV Finest pierside in Kingston, Washington

History
- Owner: Port Imperial Ferry Corp.
- Route: Manhattan–Port Imperial, New Jersey
- Builder: Derecktor Shipyards
- Completed: 1996
- Identification: MMSI 366990580, IMO number: 9132076
- Owner: Kitsap Transit
- Port of registry: Bremerton, Washington, United States
- Route: Seattle–Port of Kingston, Kitsap County
- Acquired: October 2018
- Refit: March–October 2018, Nichols Brothers shipyard, Whidbey Island, $5 million
- Status: Started commuter service November 26, 2018

General characteristics
- Type: Catamaran high-speed craft (fast ferry)
- Tonnage: 408 GT
- Length: 38 m (124 ft 8 in)
- Beam: 10 m (32 ft 10 in)
- Height: 6 m (19 ft 8 in)
- Draft: 3 m (9 ft 10 in)
- Installed power: 2 × MTU 16V398 TE74 L marine diesel engines, 4,000 kW (5,400 hp) total
- Propulsion: Water jet drive
- Speed: 35 knots (65 km/h; 40 mph)
- Capacity: 350 passengers and 16 bicycles
- Notes: Vessel data via US Coast Guard Vessel Information Service unless noted

MV Finest is an aluminum-hulled catamaran fast passenger ferry built at Derecktor Shipyards in 1997 for New York Fast Ferry Services. She is owned and operated by Kitsap Transit on a Seattle–Kingston route since 2018. Finest is a former NY Waterway vessel and at one point provided service from the Massachusetts mainland to Martha's Vineyard and Nantucket.

== 9/11 maritime evacuation ==
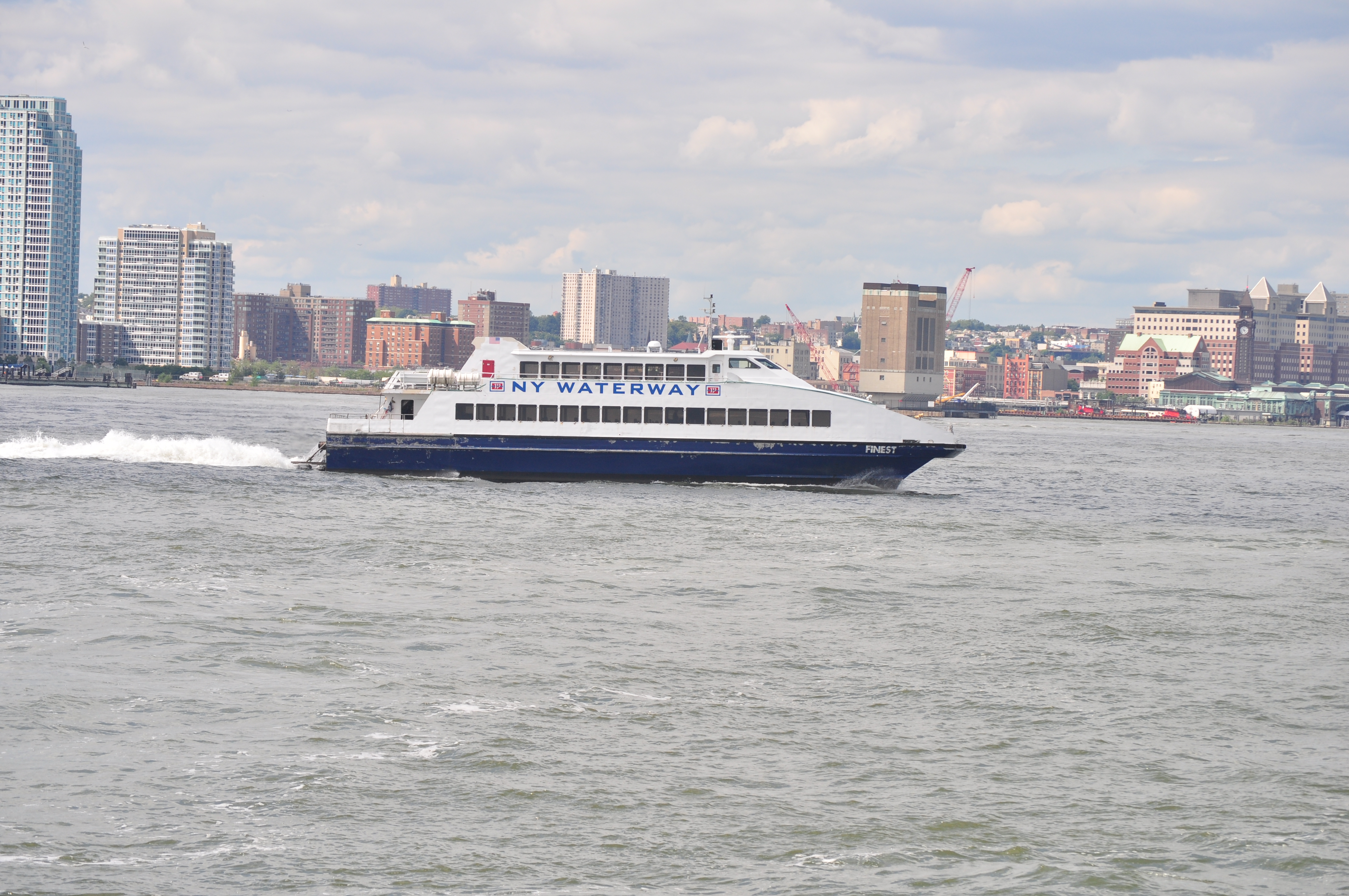
MV Finest on the Hudson in 2013

While in service in New York Harbor for New York Fast Ferry Services, Finest participated in the maritime evacuation of Lower Manhattan after the September 11, 2001 World Trade Center attacks. According to her captain, she was the second vessel to arrive at Manhattan to transfer injured people off the island.

== Puget Sound service ==
After her purchase by Kitsap Transit, she was moved through the Panama Canal in February 2018, on the back of another vessel, then overhauled in Washington State for more than $7.5 million.

In early November 2018, Kitsap Transit announced that Finest would begin Kitsap Fast Ferries passenger service on November 26 that year. The state governor visited the ship and terminal at Kingston while attending a ribbon-cutting ceremony on November 19 in advance of scheduled service.
