= MV Sally Fox =

Passenger-only ferry running between Seattle and Vashon Island

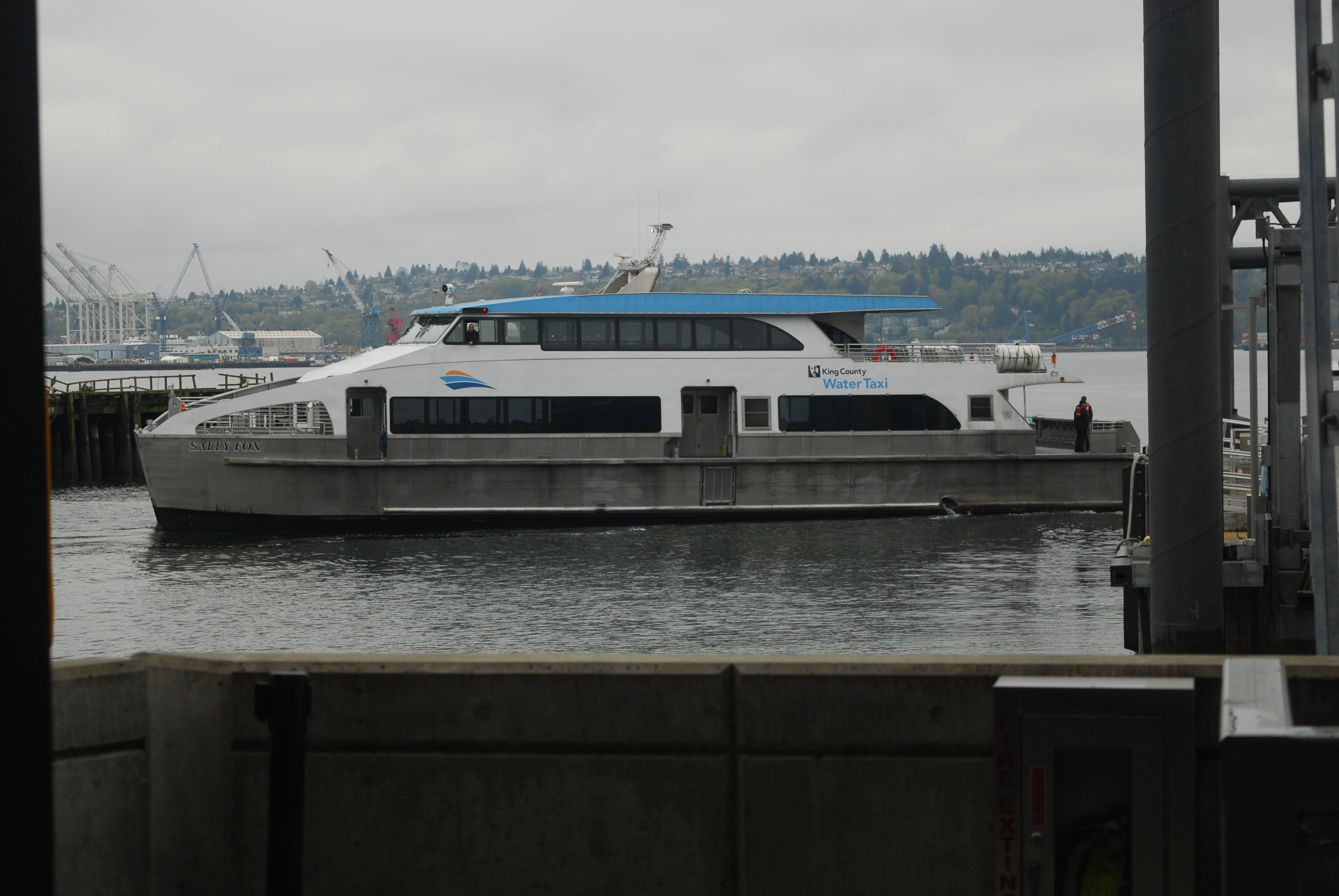

History
- Name: MV Sally Fox
- Owner: King County
- Operator: King County Water Taxi
- Port of registry: Seattle, Washington
- Route: Vashon Island–Seattle
- Builder: All American Marine
- Cost: US$6.25 million
- Laid down: 2014
- Launched: December 15, 2014
- Completed: 2014
- In service: April 8, 2015
- Identification: IMO number: 9776729; MMSI number: 338790000; Callsign: WDH7915

General characteristics
- Type: Catamaran passenger ferry
- Length: 104.3 ft (31.8 m)
- Beam: 32.9 ft (10.0 m)
- Draft: 3.6 ft (1.1 m)
- Decks: 2
- Installed power: 2 x 1,800 bhp (1,300 kW) (biodiesel engines)
- Propulsion: Fixed-pitch propellers
- Speed: Cruising: 28 knots (52 km/h; 32 mph); Maximum: 31 knots (57 km/h; 36 mph)
- Capacity: 278 passengers
- Crew: 3

MV Sally Fox is a passenger-only ferry built for the King County Water Taxi. The Sally Fox is 104 feet (32 m) long and has a capacity of 278 passengers seated in two indoor decks and outdoor balconies. The aluminum catamaran was built in 2014 by All American Marine in Bellingham, Washington for US$6.25 million (US$8.49 million in 2025 dollars), and is used primarily on the Vashon Island–Seattle route. The boat began operating on the Vashon route in April 2015, replacing two leased boats. The vessel was named for Sally Fox, a Vashon Island activist who fought for passenger ferry service to the island. It is the sister ship of the MV Doc Maynard, which entered service in 2016.
