= MV Spirit of Kingston =

Passenger-only ferry running between Seattle and West Seattle

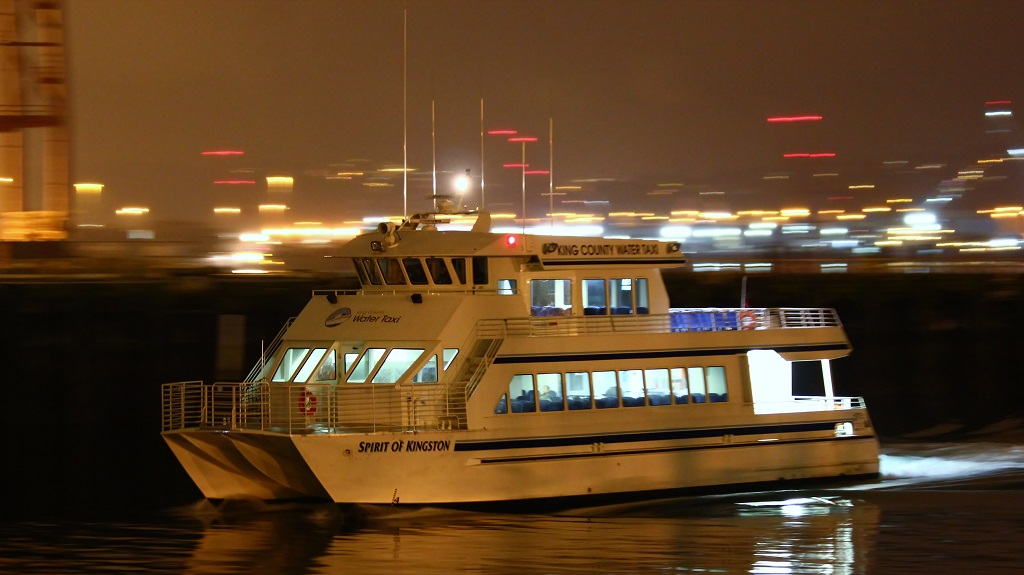
- Spirit of Kingston approaching Colman Dock, Seattle in 2013

History
- Name: MV Spirit
- Owner: Four Seasons Marine
- Port of registry: Juneau, Alaska
- Route: Skagway–Haines, Alaska
- Builder: All American Marine
- Laid down: July 2004
- Launched: December 2004
- In service: 2005
- Out of service: Summer 2010
- Fate: Sold to Port of Kingston

History
- Name: MV Spirit of Kingston
- Owner: Port of Kingston
- Operator: SoundRunner (Kingston)
- Port of registry: Kingston, Washington
- Route: Kingston–Seattle
- Christened: March 28, 2010
- Acquired: February 2010
- In service: October 2010
- Out of service: September 2012
- Fate: Transferred to King County

History
- Owner: King County
- Operator: King County Water Taxi
- Port of registry: Seattle, Washington
- Route: West Seattle–Seattle (backup)
- Acquired: March 2013
- In service: April 2013
- Identification: MMSI number: 367017270; Callsign: WDC3974

General characteristics
- Type: Catamaran passenger ferry
- Displacement: 43 (light)
- Length: 71.7 ft (21.9 m)
- Beam: 25.6 ft (7.8 m)
- Draft: 3 ft (0.9 m)
- Installed power: 4 x 740 hp (550 kW) Detroit Diesel Series 60; Northern Lights MP40C generators
- Propulsion: Hamilton HJ 362 waterjets
- Speed: Cruising: 28 knots (52 km/h; 32 mph); Maximum: 42.5 knots (79 km/h; 49 mph)
- Capacity: 149 passengers
- Crew: 3

MV Spirit of Kingston is a 65-foot (20 m), 149 passenger passenger-only ferry owned and operated as part of the King County Water Taxi fleet.

== History ==
Spirit of Kingston was built by All American Marine in Bellingham, Washington in 2004 and launched in January 2005. She was formerly in use in Alaska under the name Spirit as a ferry between Skagway and Haines and for eco-tourism. In early 2010 she was acquired by the Port of Kingston for their SoundRunner service via a $3.5 million Federal Transit Administration grant. She sailed between Downtown Seattle and Kingston until the service was discontinued in the fall of 2012.

On March 18, 2013, Spirit of Kingston was acquired by the King County Ferry District at no cost under an arrangement with the Federal Transit Administration, which had originally provided the grant funding to the Port of Kingston for its acquisition. Service was projected to begin in the late spring of 2013.

Two months after her acquisition by the KCFD, Spirit of Kingston entered service on the West Seattle/Downtown Seattle route.

In January 2016, the Spirit of Kingston was replaced by Doc Maynard. Spirit of Kingston now serves as the backup vessel on the West Seattle/Downtown Seattle route, when Doc Maynard or Sally Fox goes out of service.

== Technical information ==
Spirit of Kingston has a catamaran hull and has waterjet propulsion for a cruise speed of 28 knots and maximum speed of 42.5 knots. She is powered by four 14 L Detroit Diesel Series 60 engines that produce a total of 740 horsepower (550 kW) and meet EPA Tier 3 emissions standards.
