= Colman Dock =

Ferry terminal in Seattle, Washington, U.S.

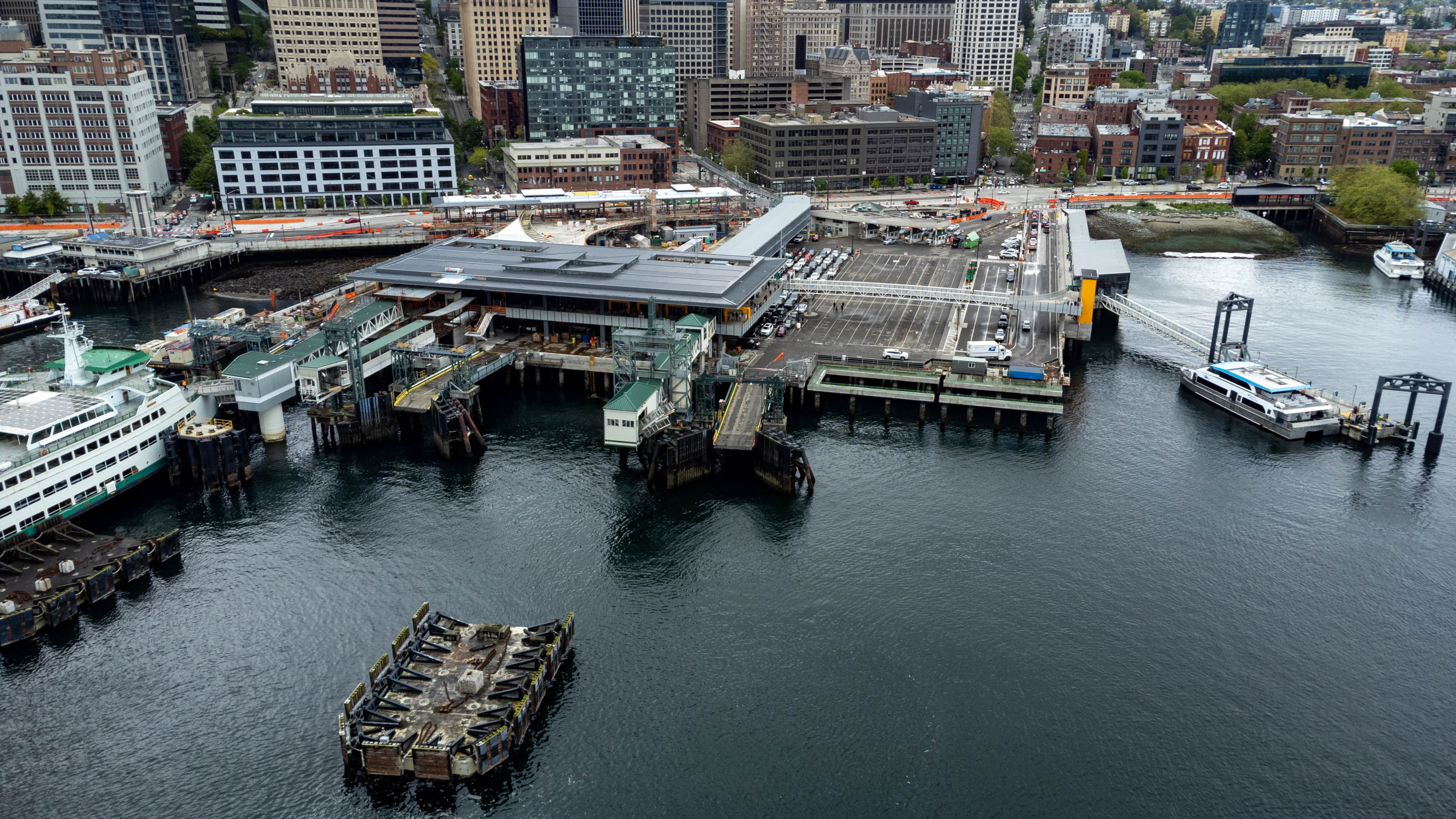
- Aerial view of Colman Dock during expansion in 2022
- Type: Ferry terminal
- Location: Seattle, Washington, U.S.
- Coordinates: 47°36′10″N 122°20′19″W
- Official name: Seattle Ferry Terminal
- Owner: Washington State Ferries (WSDOT)

Characteristics
- Total length: prior dock (1917): 700 ft (213.4 m)
- Width: prior dock (1917): 115 ft (35.1 m)

History
- Opening date: 1882
- Rebuilt: 1908, 1966, 2019–23

Colman Dock, also called Pier 52, is the primary ferry terminal in Seattle, Washington, United States. The original pier is no longer in existence, but the terminal, now used by the Washington State Ferries system, is still called "Colman Dock". The terminal serves two routes to Bainbridge Island and Bremerton and has an adjacent passenger-only facility at Pier 50 for King County Water Taxi and Kitsap Fast Ferries routes.

== Location ==
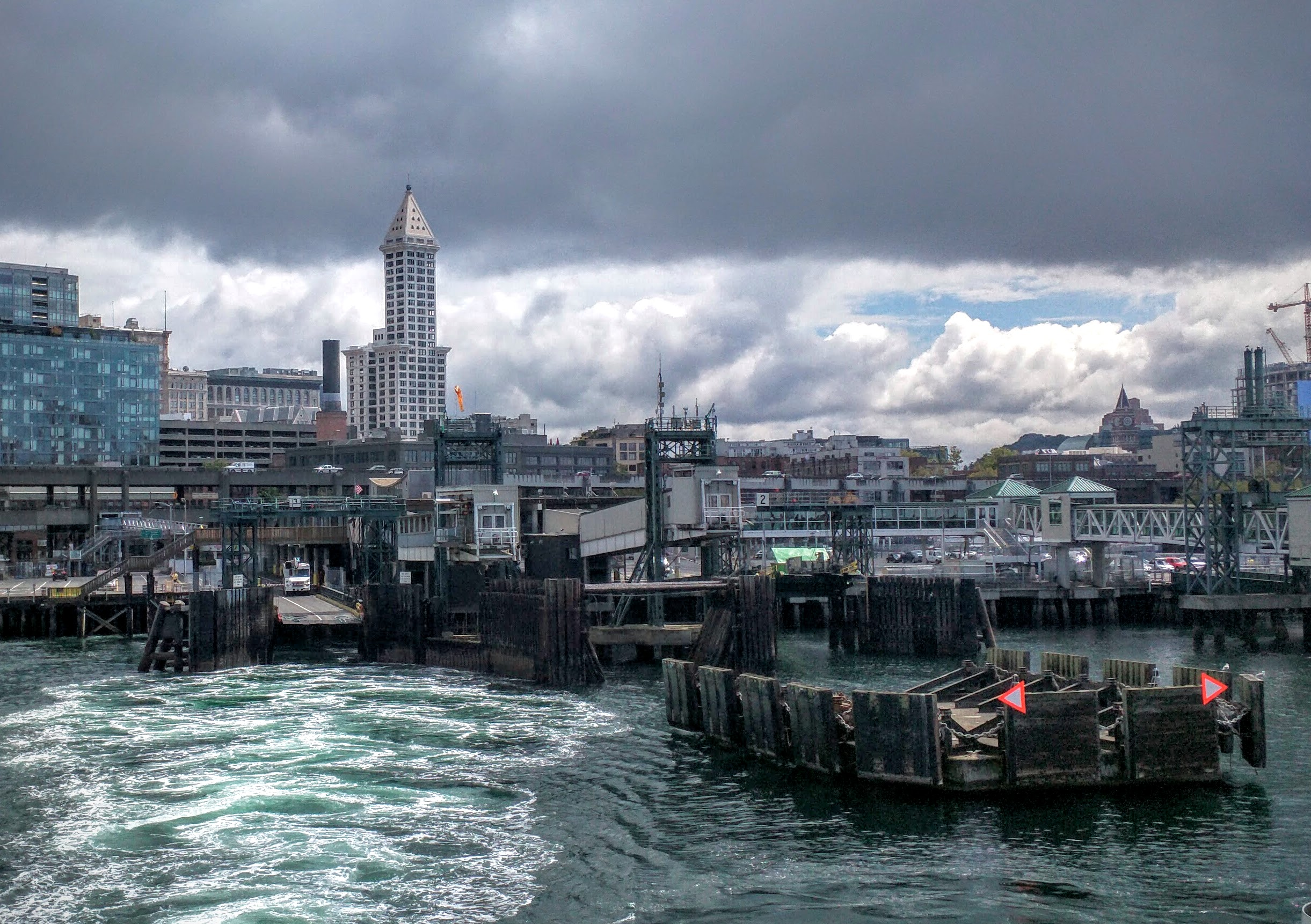
Colman Dock from the Seattle–Bainbridge Island ferry, with Smith Tower in the background

Originally Colman Dock was located at the foot of Columbia Street, and was immediately to the north of Pier 2. Before 1910, the wharf immediately to the north of Colman dock was used by the West Seattle ferry. In 1910 this wharf was replaced with the Grand Trunk Pacific dock. In 1964 the entire area was used for the much larger ferry terminal dock which exists today.

== History ==
Colman dock (clock tower on right) between 1912 and 1914.

Pier 52 was historically known as Colman Wharf. The original Colman Dock was built by Scottish engineer James Colman in 1882 for the Oregon Improvement Company's coal bunkers. It burned with most of the rest of the city in the Great Seattle Fire of 1889, but was quickly rebuilt. In 1908, Colman extended the dock to a total length of 705 feet (215 m) and added a domed waiting room and a 72-foot (22 m) clocktower. This expansion was designed by the Seattle architectural firm Beezer Brothers.

Colman also set up a company, the Colman Dock Company, to conduct the dock's business affairs. Following the merger of the La Conner Transportation Company, headed by Joshua Green (1869–1975), with the Puget Sound Navigation Company (PSN), headed by Charles E. Peabody (1857–1926) the Colman Dock Company, and the Colman Dock itself, came under PSN control. In 1910, PSN was approaching monopoly control over the inland steamship routes of western Washington, with the company's most serious challenger being the Kitsap County Transportation Company (KCTC), headed by Kitsap County businessman Warren L. Gazzam (1864–1961). The rivalry between the two companies became almost a personal matter between Green and Gazzam. In 1910, Green, having obtained control of Colman Dock, and engaged in a rate war with KCTC, ordered KCTC not to land its boats at Colman Dock. KCTC then moved several piers north, to the Galbraith, Bacon dock.

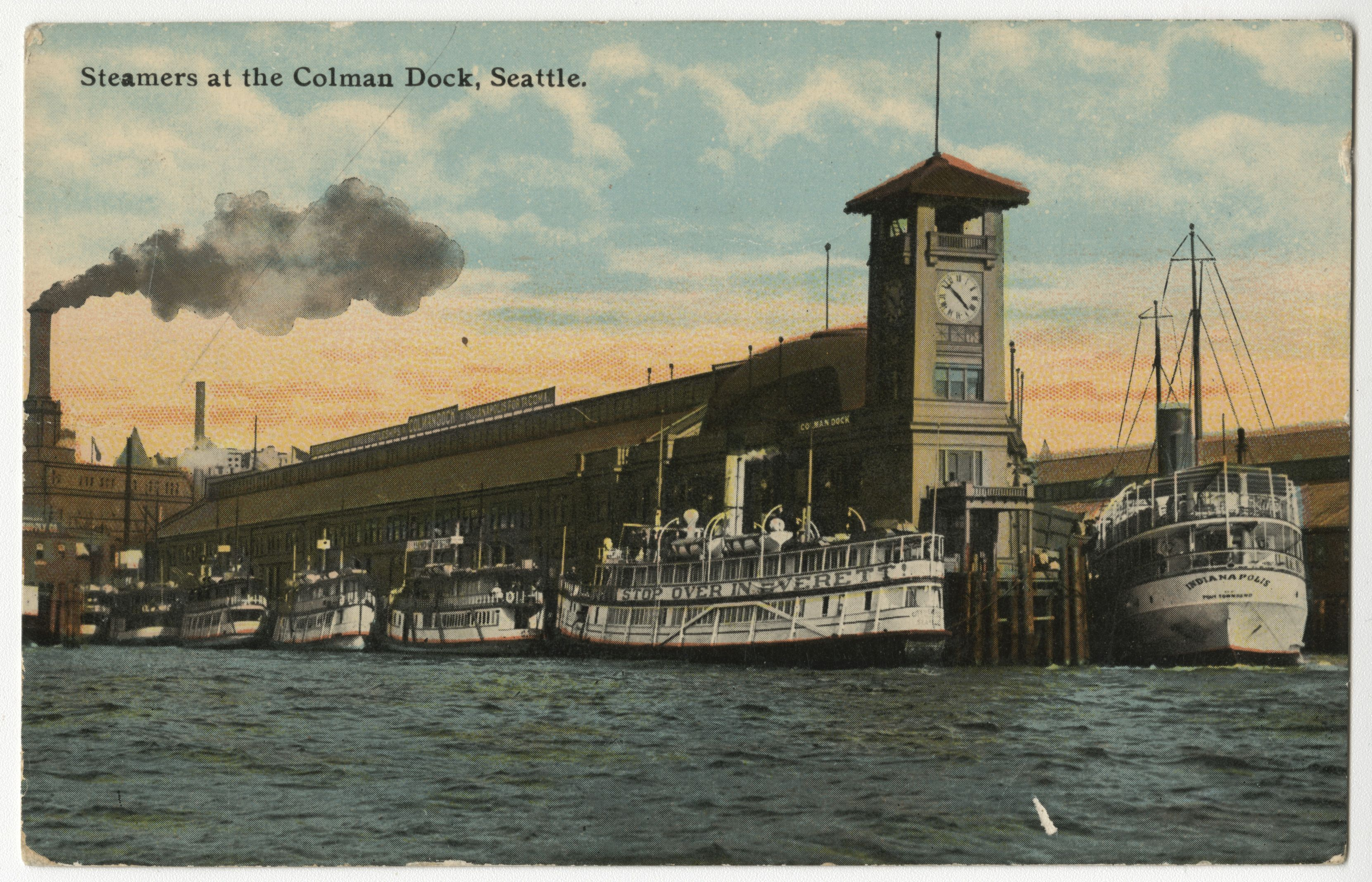
Colman Dock with mosquito fleet ships in the early 1910s

Colman Dock was seriously damaged when, on the night of April 25, 1912, the steel-hulled ship Alameda accidentally set its engines "full speed ahead" instead of reversing, and slammed into the dock. The dock tower fell into the bay and the sternwheeler Telegraph was sunk. The clock was salvaged, as was the Telegraph, and the dock was reconstructed with a new tower. No one died in the Alameda accident, but a less dramatic accident the following month proved fatal. On May 19, 1912, a gangplank collapsed as passengers were boarding the Black Ball steamer Flyer. At least 60 people fell into the water. One woman and one child died.

In 1917, Colman Dock was owned and operated by Colman Dock Company, with B. P. Morgan as manager. Colman Dock was the terminal of the Puget Sound Navigation Company, the Merchants Transportation Company, and several Puget Sound shipping lines. Colman Dock measured 700 by 115 feet (213 by 35 m), with 1,400 feet (430 m) of berthing space. In 1917 an overhead walk (still in existence in 1983) led from the Seattle business district to the waiting room, from which most of the Puget Sound steamship passenger traffic originated. There were also adjustable passenger gangplanks and adjustable freight slips. In 1917 Colman Dock was equipped with a Barlow marine elevator. Colman Dock could accommodate 14 Puget Sound steamboats at one time. There were offices on the north side of the overhead walk.

In the mid-1930s Puget Sound Navigation Company modernized Colman Dock, using an Art Deco style that matched their streamlined signature ferry MV Kalakala.

In 1935, Colman Dock became the Seattle terminal for what had been the Alki–Manchester ferry when the dock at Alki Point washed out.

In 1951, Washington State bought out PSNC and took over the ferry system. The state paid $500,000 for the ferry terminal at Colman Dock.

Work on the present terminal began a decade later; there have been several reconfigurations and modernizations since. The very month that the state ferry terminal opened, it was the subject of another accident. The Kalakala, which had recently been voted Seattle's second biggest attraction after the then-new Space Needle, rammed the terminal February 21, 1966. Though dramatic, the damage proved not to be severe. The ferry needed only minor repairs and was back in service the next day. Repairs to the slip cost $80,000 and took two months to complete.

The clock from the old Colman Dock tower fell into the bay in the 1912 Alameda accident and was reinstalled. It was later removed in the 1936 renovation and stored in pieces at a warehouse for forty years. The clock was rediscovered in 1976 and purchased by the Port of Seattle in 1985; the restored was gifted to the Washington State Department of Transportation and reinstalled on the present Colman Dock on May 18, 1985. It was removed in 2018 to prepare for the replacement of the terminal facilities and underwent another round of restoration work. The clock is planned to be reinstalled in 2025.

The MV Wenatchee arriving at Colman Dock

=== Redevelopment ===
The first phase of the new terminal building opened on September 15, 2019. The remainder of the 20,000-square-foot (1,900 m^{2}) main building was opened in November 2022 and can hold up to 1,900 passengers in the waiting area, which has 362 seats and twelve turnstiles. The entry building along Alaskan Way was opened on August 3, 2023, with plans for a grab-and-go retail counter and other vendor spaces to open at a later date. The Colman Dock expansion added 50,000 square feet (4,600 m^{2}) of new indoor space, which was re-oriented to face the water, and cost $489 million to construct.

The pedestrian bridge, built parallel to Marion Street at the site of the former overpass, began construction in July 2022 and is scheduled to be completed in September 2023. The concrete bridge is 110 feet (34 m) long and 16 feet (4.9 m) wide, supported by a series of Y-shaped columns. The new bridge is expected to cost $6.3 million with funding from WSDOT and the city government. A section of the former bridge along the north side of the Commuter Building was demolished in late 2020 following the opening of a temporary bridge above Western Avenue and Columbia Street.

The plazas at Colman Dock were given indigenous Lushootseed names suggested by local tribes that were approved by the Washington State Transportation Commission in June 2023. The north plaza at Columbia Street, ʔulułali, was named by the Suquamish Tribe for a term meaning "a place of traveling water"; the south plaza at Yesler Way, sluʔwił, was named by the Muckleshoot Tribe for "a canoe pass". Signage at both plazas was installed in March 2025.

== Service ==
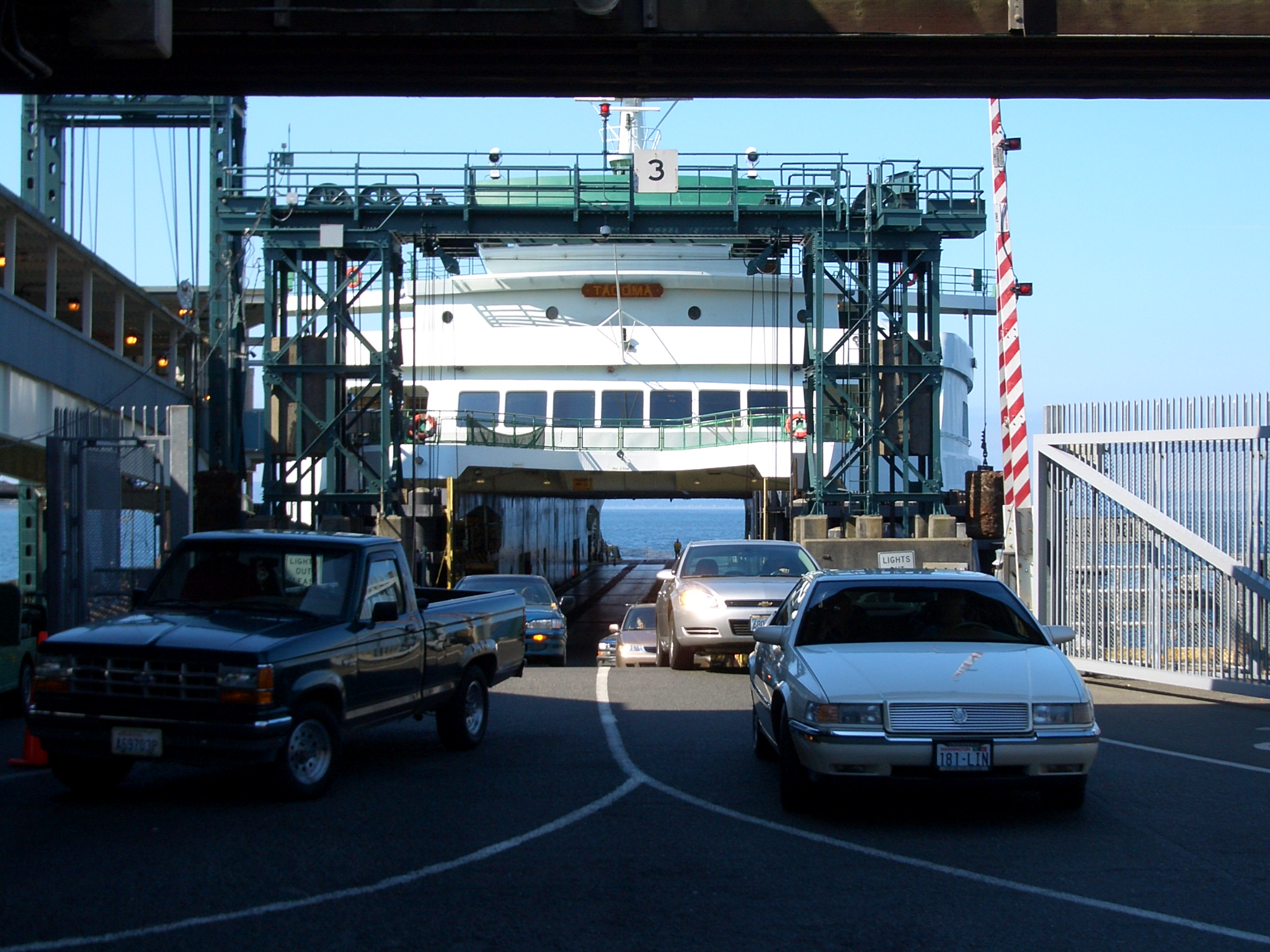
Ferry unloading at Colman Dock, 2006.

Two automobile ferry routes currently depart from Colman Dock: the Seattle–Bainbridge Island ferry and the Seattle–Bremerton ferry. The terminal building can hold 1,900 people and the outdoor queueing area has space for 611 vehicles.

Two passenger-only ferry systems, the King County Water Taxi and Kitsap Fast Ferries, operate out of a separate facility at Pier 50 on the south side of Colman Dock. The water taxi serves West Seattle and Vashon Island, while the Fast Ferries serve Bremerton and Kingston. From 2017 to 2019, passenger ferries used a temporary passenger-only dock at the north side of Pier 52. The new Pier 50 facility opened on August 12, 2019, with a covered waiting area that can hold 500 people. A pedestrian overpass opened in 2020 that connects it to the Washington State Ferries facility.

== See also ==
- Colman Building
