= MV Doc Maynard =

Passenger-only ferry running between Seattle and West Seattle

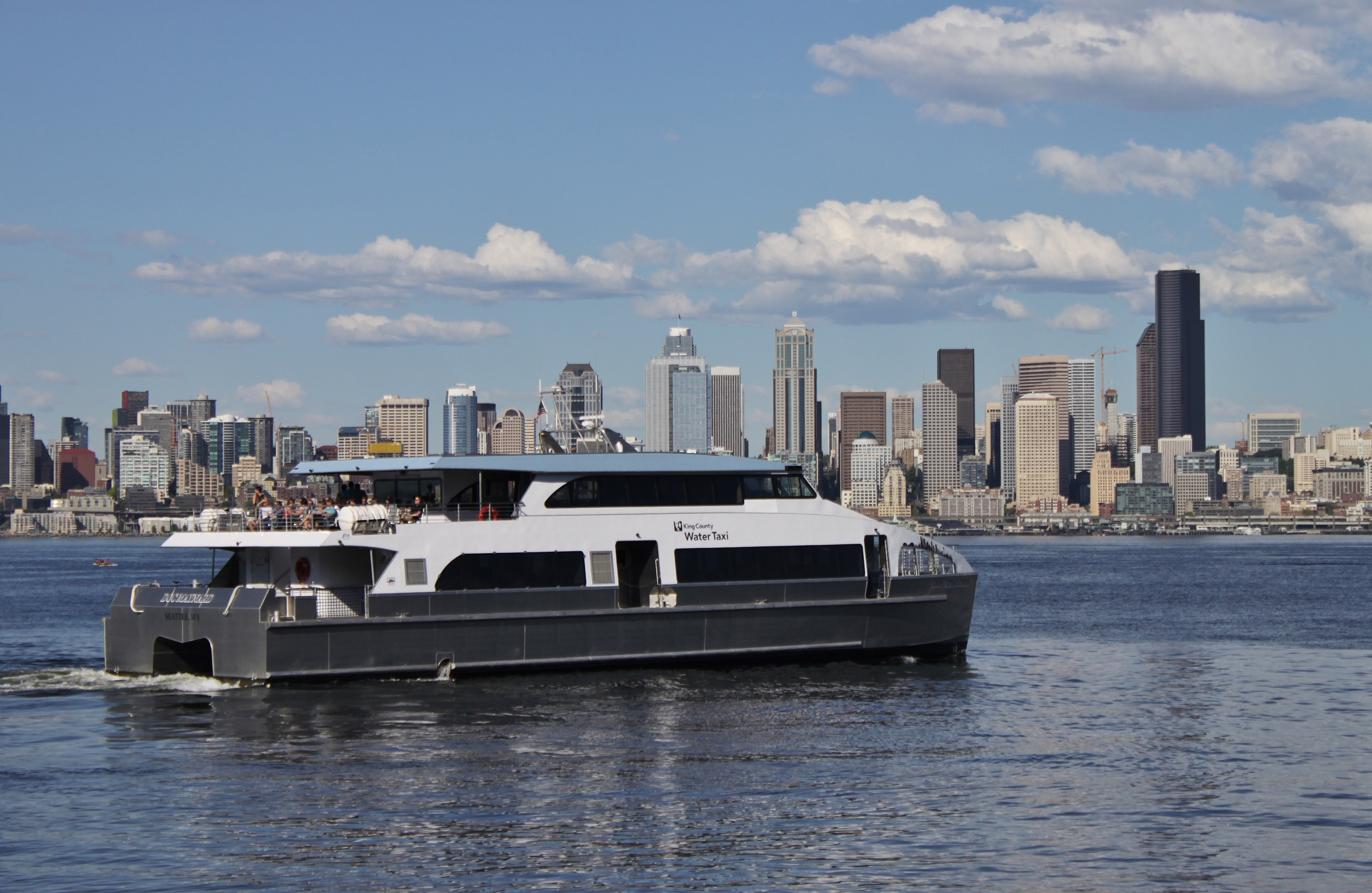

History
- Name: MV Doc Maynard
- Owner: King County
- Operator: King County Water Taxi
- Port of registry: Seattle, Washington
- Route: West Seattle–Seattle
- Builder: All American Marine
- Cost: US$6.25 million
- Laid down: 2014
- Completed: 2015
- Maiden voyage: September 18, 2015
- In service: January 7, 2016
- Identification: IMO number: 8793316; Call sign: WDI3125; MMSI number: 338224000

General characteristics
- Type: Catamaran passenger ferry
- Length: 104.3 ft (31.8 m)
- Beam: 32.9 ft (10.0 m)
- Draft: 3.6 ft (1.1 m)
- Decks: 2
- Installed power: 2 x 1,800 bhp (1,300 kW) (biodiesel engines)
- Propulsion: Fixed-pitch propellers
- Speed: Cruising: 28 knots (52 km/h; 32 mph); Maximum: 31 knots (57 km/h; 36 mph)
- Capacity: 278 passengers
- Crew: 3

MV Doc Maynard is a passenger-only ferry built for the King County Water Taxi. The Doc Maynard is 104 feet (32 m) long and has a capacity of 278 passengers seated in two indoor and outdoor decks. It was built in 2015 by All American Marine in Bellingham, Washington for US$6.25 million (US$8.29 million in 2024 dollars), and is used primarily on the West Seattle–Seattle route. The vessel was named for David Swinson "Doc" Maynard, one of the pioneer founders of Seattle. It is the sister ship of the MV Sally Fox, which entered service in 2015.

== Operational history ==
On November 2, 2023, the MV Doc Maynard successfully intercepted a container barge that went adrift on course for the Seattle waterfront, redirecting it to the Pier 66 Marina's wall. The Maynard was not damaged and only fell 15 minutes behind schedule in taxi operations.
