= Issaquah (disambiguation) =

Issaquah, Washington, is a suburb of Seattle in the U.S. state of Washington.

Issaquah may also refer to:

== Places and businesses ==
- Issaquah Alps, a nearby mountain range
- Issaquah Creek, a minor stream
- Issaquah Highlands, a residential neighborhood
- Issaquah High School, a high school
- Issaquah School District, the city's school district
- Issaquah station, a historic railroad depot

== Transportation ==
- Issaquah 100 class ferry, a class of state ferries
- Issaquah (steam ferry), a steam ferry built in 1914
- MV Issaquah, a state ferry built in 1979
