= MV Kittitas =

American ferry vessel

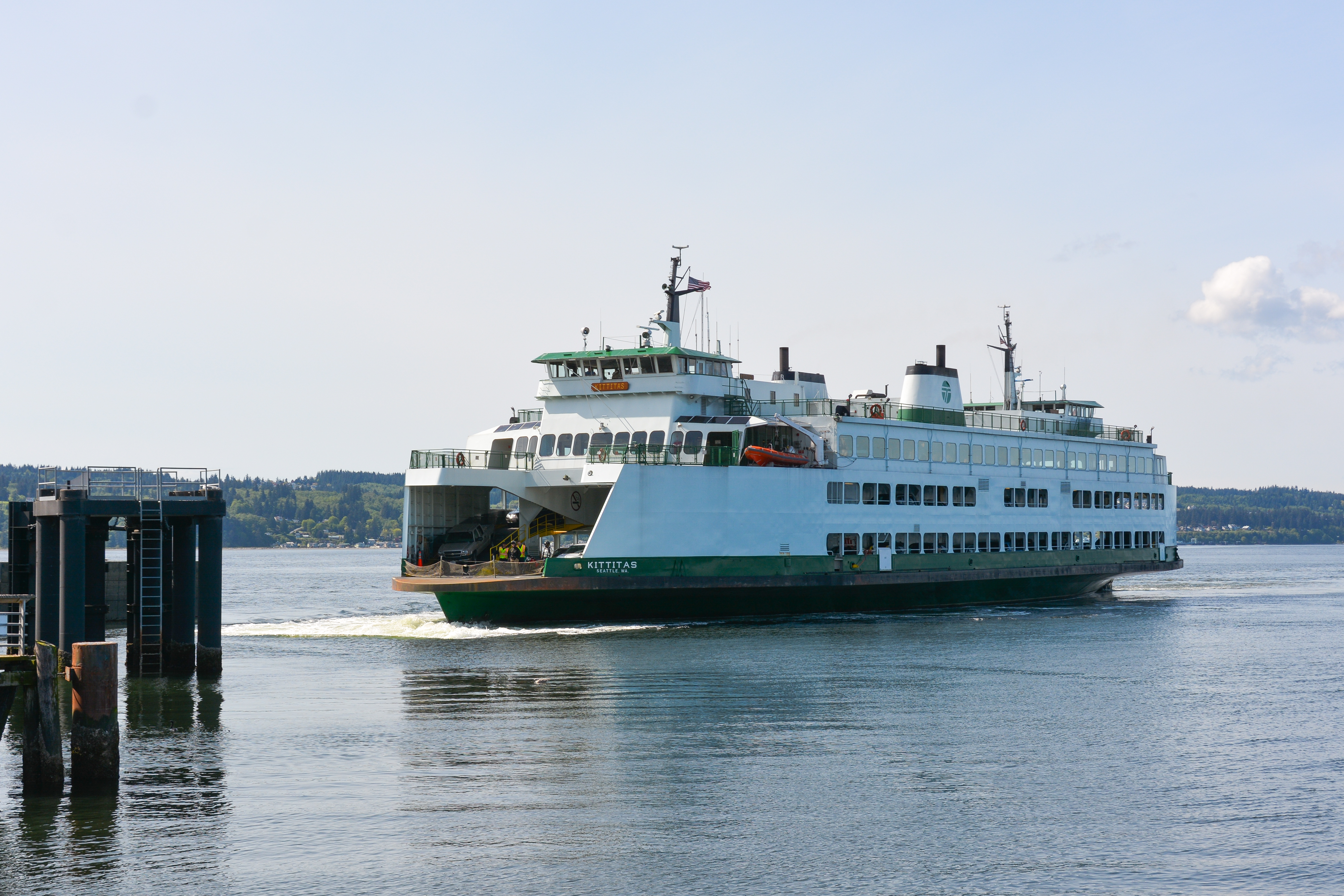
- Kittitas arriving at Mukilteo in 2014

History
- Name: Kittitas
- Owner: WSDOT
- Operator: Washington State Ferries
- Port of registry: Seattle, Washington, United States
- Route: Fauntleroy-Vashon Island-Southworth (as of October 11, 2023)
- Ordered: 1979; Original 1978 plans shelved
- Builder: Marine Power and Equipment, Seattle
- Laid down: 1979
- Christened: 1980
- Completed: 1980; Refit: 1990
- In service: 1980
- Identification: IMO number: 7808114; MMSI number: 366772960; Callsign: WYQ9302; Official Number: D627507
- Status: In service

General characteristics
- Class & type: Issaquah-class auto/passenger ferry
- Displacement: 3,310 long tons (3,360 t)
- Length: 328 ft (100.0 m)
- Beam: 78 ft 8 in (24.0 m)
- Draft: 16 ft 6 in (5.0 m)
- Decks: 4
- Deck clearance: 15 ft 10 in (4.8 m)
- Installed power: Total 5,000 hp (3,700 kW) from 2 diesel engines
- Propulsion: Diesel
- Speed: 16 knots (30 km/h; 18 mph)
- Capacity: 1,200 passengers; 124 vehicles (max 26 commercial)

MV Kittitas is an Issaquah-class ferry operated by Washington State Ferries.

== History ==
The Kittitas was built in 1980, as the second Issaquah-class ferry. When delivered it acted as a relief boat until it was moved to the Mukilteo–Clinton route in the mid 1980s. In 1990, in order to keep up with growing demand, the Kittitas underwent a capacity expansion by adding additional vehicle areas above the vehicle areas along the outside edge of the ferry. These upgrades had been planned for in the original design of the vessels. The ferry's passenger cabin was updated in the late 1990s. Included in the upgrades were the removal of many tables located in the passenger cabin to allow for the bench seats to be spaced closer together in some sections of the ship. The galley area was also upgraded and each ship was given a unique look. The original color on the Kittitas was yellow, and her new colors are a mix of turquoise and orange.

The Kittitas serves the triangle route along with the MV Cathlamet and MV Sealth.
