= MV Cathlamet =

Ship built in 1981

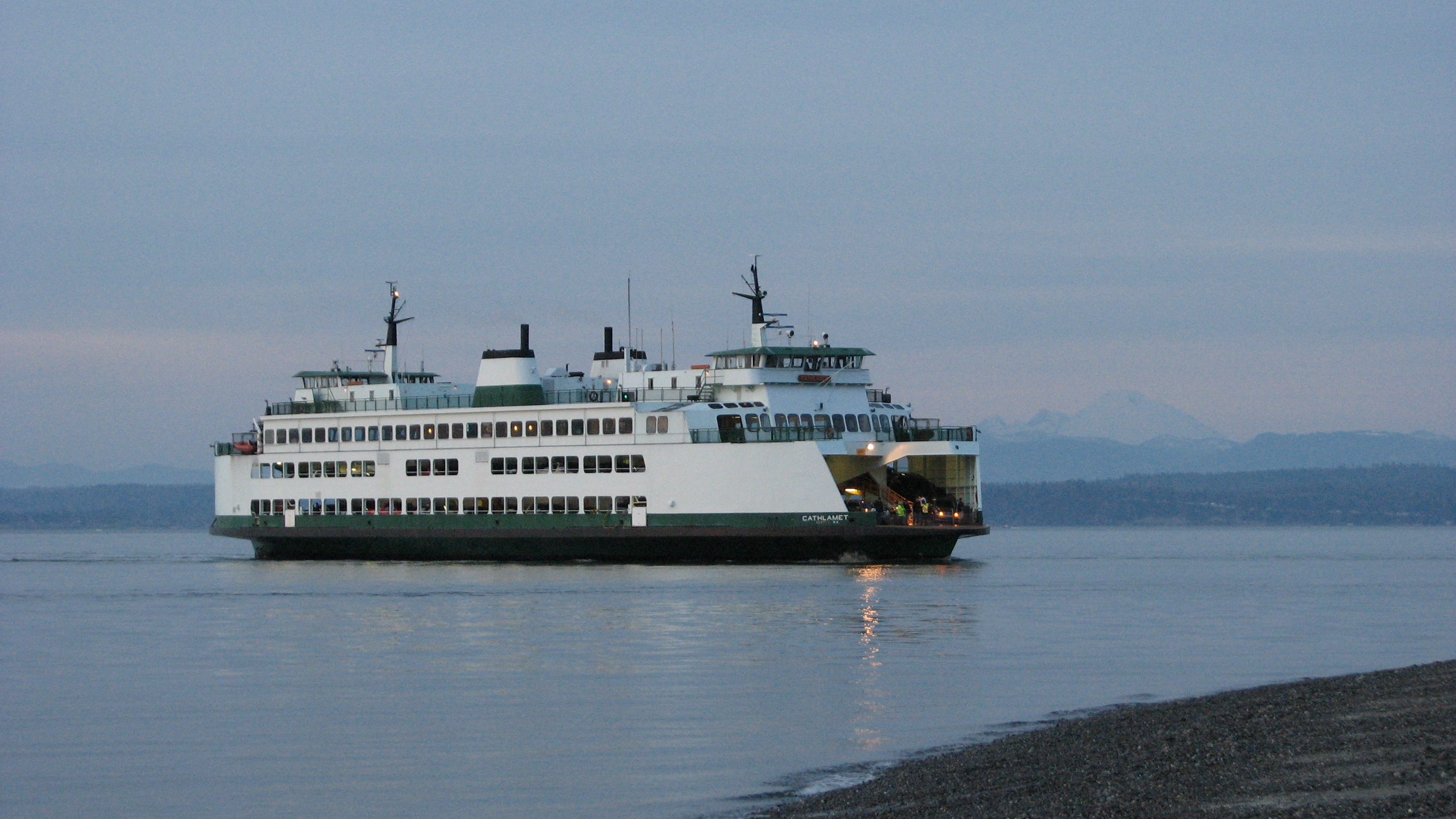
- Cathlamet in 2009

History
- Name: Cathlamet
- Owner: WSDOT
- Operator: Washington State Ferries
- Port of registry: Seattle, Washington, United States
- Route: Fauntleroy-Vashon Island-Southworth
- Builder: Marine Power and Equipment, Seattle
- Completed: 1981; Refit: 1991
- Identification: IMO number: 7808138; MMSI number: 366773070; Callsign: WYR7641; Official Number: 636551
- Status: In service

General characteristics
- Class & type: Issaquah-class auto/passenger ferry
- Length: 328 ft (100.0 m)
- Beam: 78 ft 8 in (24.0 m)
- Draft: 16 ft 6 in (5.0 m)
- Decks: 2 car decks; 1 passenger cabin deck
- Deck clearance: 15 ft 6 in (4.7 m)
- Installed power: Total 5,000 hp (3,700 kW) from 2 diesel engines
- Speed: 16 knots (30 km/h; 18 mph)
- Capacity: 1,200 passengers; 124 vehicles (max 26 commercial)
- Crew: 12

The MV Cathlamet is an Issaquah-class ferry operated by Washington State Ferries.

== History ==
The Cathlamet was built in 1981, as an Issaquah-class ferry, for service on the Mukilteo-Clinton route. In 1991, in order to keep up with growing demand, the Cathlamet, along with many of her sister ships were upgraded from Issaquah class to Issaquah 130-class ferries, by adding additional vehicle areas above the vehicle areas along the outside edge of the ferry. These upgrades had been planned for in the original design of the vessels. The ferry's passenger cabin was updated in the late 1990s, included in the upgrades were the removal of many tables located in the passenger cabin to allow for the bench seats to be spaced closer together in some sections of the ship, and an upgrade of the galley area.

== Control issue ==
The Cathlamet is infamous in Puget Sound as it has on several occasions struck ferry docks while attempting to dock—occasionally referred to by Whidbey Island residents as the "Can't-land-it" and the "Crash-lamet," and a 1986 crash at the Mukilteo dock caused $500,000 in damage. The problem was eventually traced to the computer that controls the pitch of the props, which because of a large amount of unshielded wiring, would short out a couple of signal lines causing the props to re-angle for full propulsion, instead of reversing. The computer system was eventually replaced in the early 2000s, and since then, the Cathlamet has had two collisions.

== Status ==
In late June 2014, the new Olympic-class ferry Tokitae replaced the Cathlamet on the Mukilteo/Clinton route. As a result, the Cathlamet was assigned to the Southworth/Vashon/Fauntleroy route to replace the Klahowya. Since being assigned to the North Vashon Triangle route, the Cathlamet has often been used as a relief boat elsewhere showing up on the Seattle-Bremerton route or the Mukilteo-Clinton route in planned and unplanned shortages. In 2011 she sailed between Edmonds and Clinton for a few days due to work being done on the Mukilteo dock.

On the morning of February 18, 2021, a propulsion issue was found on the Cathlamet, forcing the Sealth to take over the Southworth–Vashon Island–Fauntleroy route. Washington State Ferries estimated that repairs on the ferry would last at least a month. A year later, on July 28, 2022, the Cathlamet collided with the pilings near the Fauntleroy dock, sustaining significant damage to one end in the process. According to WSDOT, no injuries were reported. An investigation attributed the accident to human error, and Cathlamet returned to service in April 2023.
