= MV Kitsap =

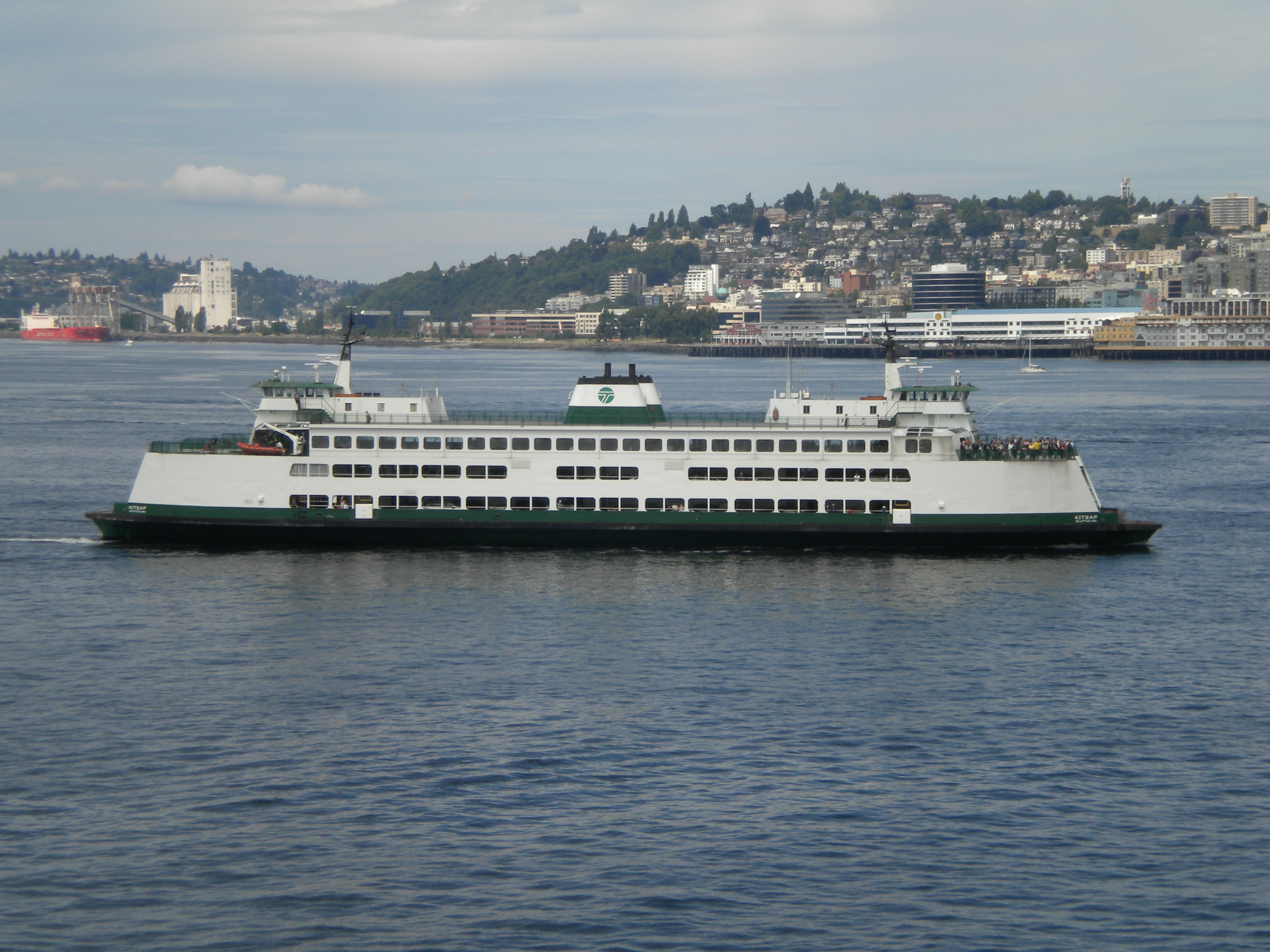
- MV Kitsap arrives in Downtown Seattle (2011)

History
- Name: MV Kitsap
- Owner: WSDOT
- Operator: Washington State Ferries
- Port of registry: Seattle, Washington, United States
- Route: Southworth-Fauntleroy-Vashon
- Builder: Marine Power and Equipment, Seattle
- Launched: 17 October 1980
- Completed: 1980; Refit: 1992
- Identification: IMO number: 7808126; MMSI number: 366772980; Callsign: WYR3421; Official Number: 630023
- Status: In service

General characteristics
- Class & type: Issaquah-class auto/passenger ferry
- Length: 328 ft (100.0 m)
- Beam: 78 ft 8 in (24.0 m)
- Draft: 16 ft 6 in (5.0 m)
- Decks: 2 car decks 1 passenger deck
- Deck clearance: 15 ft 8 in (4.8 m)
- Installed power: Total 5,000 hp (3,700 kW) from 2 diesel engines
- Speed: 16 knots (30 km/h; 18 mph)
- Capacity: 1,200 passengers; 124 vehicles (max 26 commercial)
- Crew: 12

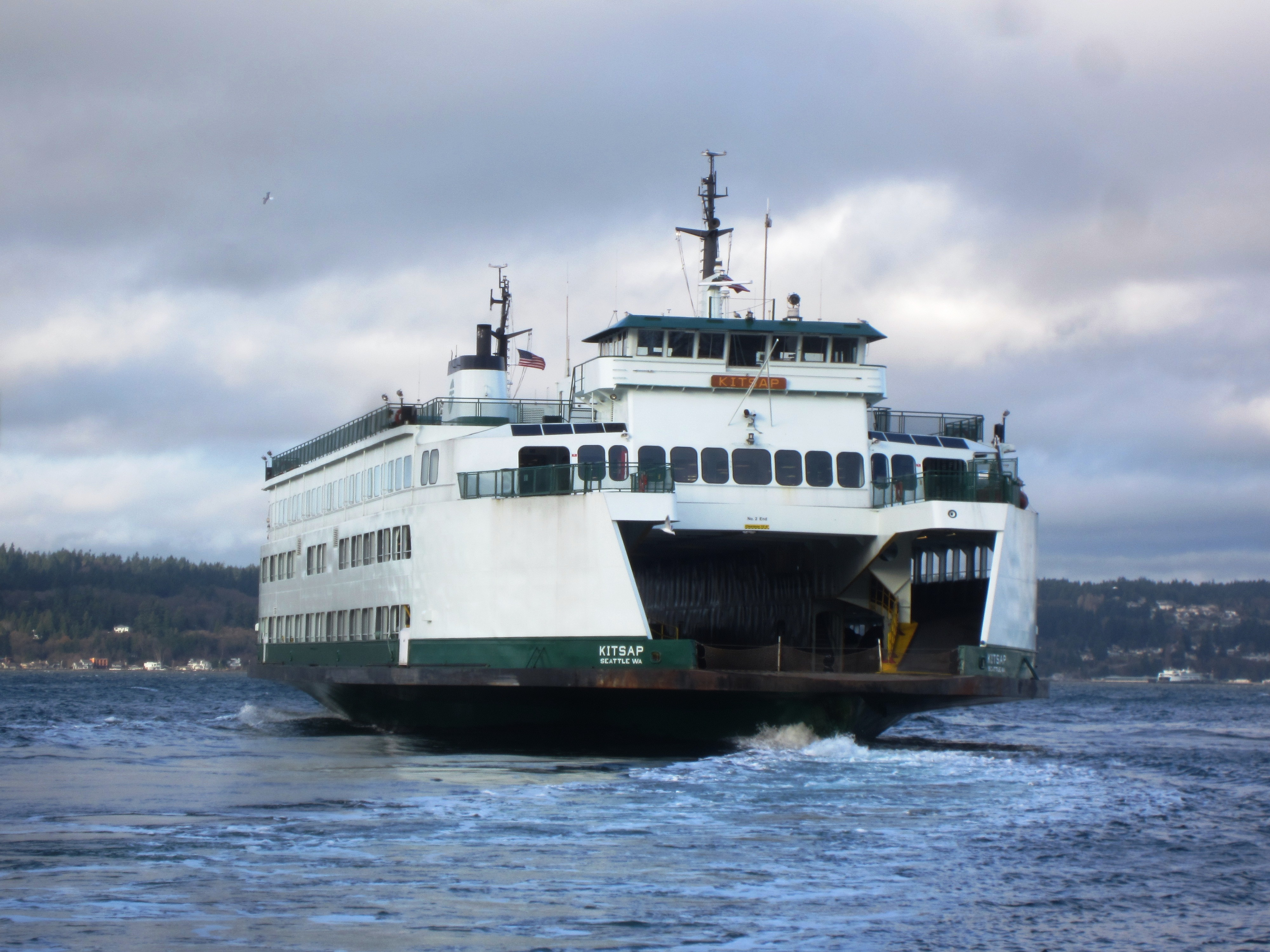
Leaving Mukilteo while filling in for the MV Tokitae.

MV Kitsap is an Issaquah-class ferry operated by Washington State Ferries. The Kitsap was built in 1980 as an Issaquah class and upgraded in 1992 moving it to the Issaquah 130 class due to adding an upper car deck. The vessel also received interior upgrades. The vessel used to have a rainbow color of blue, but has since been renovated with interior colors light, and dark blue, and dark green.

This vessel was originally used on the Seattle–Bremerton route. Over time, larger boats have generally displaced the Kitsap from the Seattle-Bremerton route, and the ferry has spent more and more time as a relief boat, filling in for ferries on other runs when they are out of service. The Kitsap is most frequently found on the Mukilteo-Clinton route, but is also often found on the Fauntleroy-Vashon-Southworth, Anacortes-San Juan Islands, and Seattle-Bremerton routes.

== Incidents ==
- In 1987, after a punk rock concert featuring Seattle band The Accüsed and British band G.B.H., rowdy concertgoers returning to Seattle from Natasha's in Bremerton incited a riot aboard the Kitsap, resulting in damages that cost $40,000.
- In 1991, the Kitsap collided with the MV Sealth in heavy fog in Rich Passage. Five years later, she ran aground on nearly the same spot as the collision.
