= MV Suquamish =

Ship launched in 2018

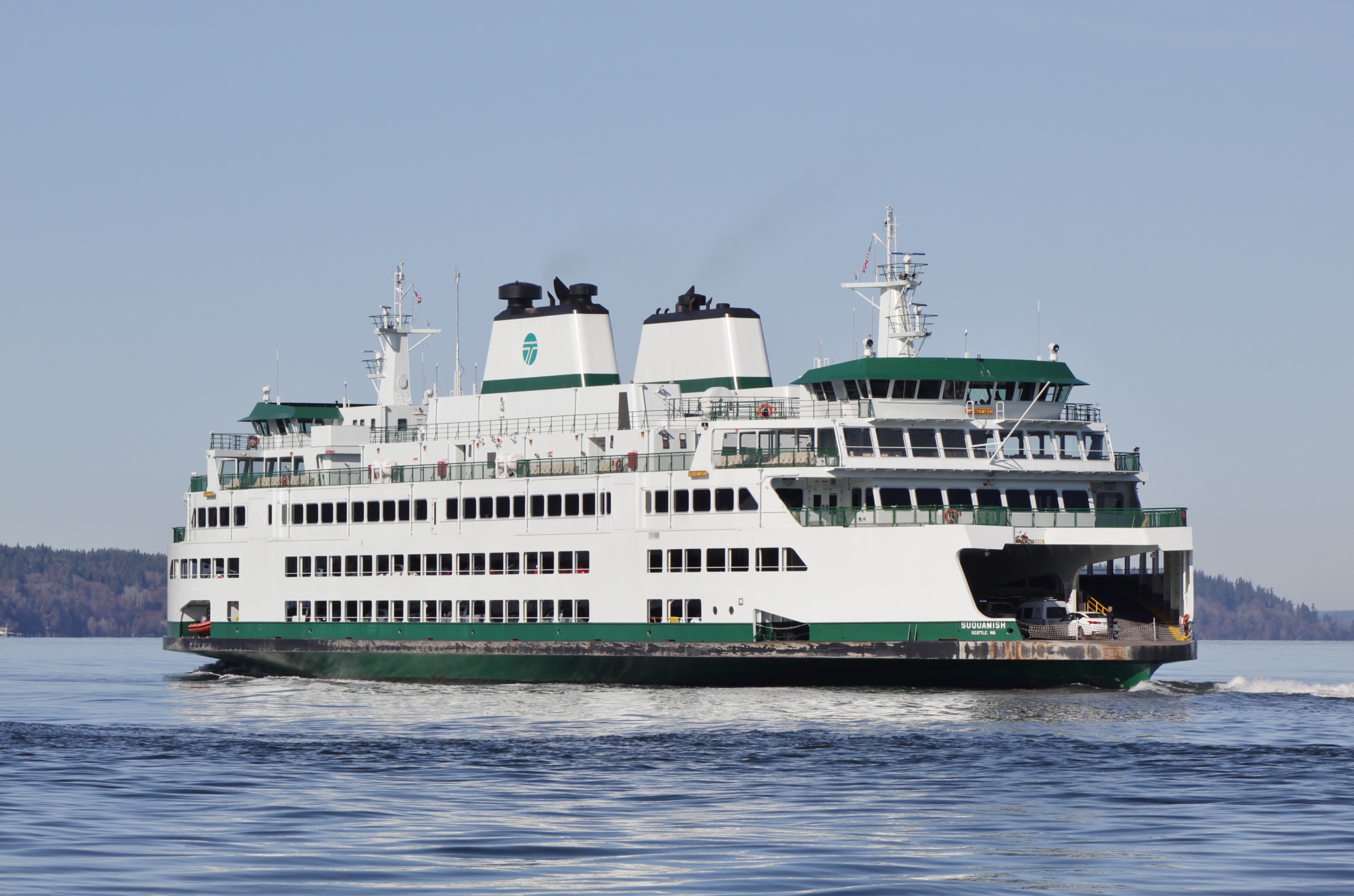
- MV Suquamish leaving Mukilteo

History
- Name: Suquamish
- Owner: Washington State Department of Transportation
- Operator: Washington State Ferries
- Port of registry: Seattle, Washington, United States
- Route: Mukilteo–Clinton ferry
- Ordered: July 2015
- Builder: Vigor Industrial, Seattle, Washington
- Cost: $122 million (approximate)
- Laid down: May 2016
- Launched: October 20, 2017
- In service: October 4, 2018
- Identification: IMO number: 9801782; MMSI number: 368027230; Callsign: WDJ9559
- Status: In service

General characteristics
- Class & type: Olympic-class auto/passenger ferry
- Displacement: 4,384 long tons (4,454 t)
- Length: 362 ft 3 in (110.4 m)
- Beam: 83 ft 2 in (25.3 m)
- Draft: 18 ft (5.5 m)
- Depth: 24 ft 6 in (7.5 m)
- Decks: 5 (2 vehicle decks, passenger deck, sun deck, nav bridge deck)
- Deck clearance: 16 ft (4.9 m)
- Installed power: 6,000 hp (4,500 kW) total from two EMD 12E-23B Tier IV diesel engines
- Propulsion: Diesel
- Speed: 17 knots (31 km/h; 20 mph)
- Capacity: 1,500 passengers; 144 vehicles (max 34 tall vehicles)
- Crew: 14 (12 with sun deck closed)

MV Suquamish is an Olympic-class ferry that is operated by Washington State Ferries and the inaugural sailing was at 12:30pm on October 4, 2018. The vessel carries 144 cars and 1,500 passengers.

She primarily serves as a maintenance relief boat for other ferries, but also sails regularly on the Mukilteo–Clinton route during the summer peak with her sister ship, the MV Tokitae.

== History ==
On March 16, 2016, the Washington State Transportation Commission chose to name the ferry Suquamish after the Suquamish tribe. Two other names, Cowlitz and Sammamish, were also considered for the ferry but ultimately rejected.

At the keel laying in May 2016, Suquamish tribe members blessed the boat and were joined by Governor Jay Inslee and Senator Christine Rolfes in a ceremonial weld strike. The ferry's superstructure was assembled in Tacoma, while the hull and car deck was built in Seattle. The superstructure was moved to Seattle for final assembly in August 2017 and completed sea trials in July 2018. The Suquamish was placed on the Mukilteo–Clinton route and entered service on October 4, 2018.
