= Issaquah (steam ferry) =

American steam ferry built in 1914

- Issaquah in California service.

History
- Name: Issaquah
- Owner: Anderson Steamboat Company; Rodeo-Vallejo Ferry Co.
- Builder: John L. Anderson (1868–1941)
- Launched: March 7, 1914
- Maiden voyage: May 2, 1914

General characteristics
- Type: steam ferry
- Tonnage: 288
- Length: 114.2 ft (34.81 m)
- Beam: 38.2 ft (11.64 m)
- Depth: 8.9 ft (2.71 m) depth of hold.
- Installed power: twin steam engines, 125 hp (93 kW) each.
- Propulsion: propellers
- Capacity: 40 cars, 600 passengers
- Crew: 6

Issaquah was a steam ferry built in 1914 that operated on Lake Washington and in San Francisco Bay.

== Design and construction ==
Issaquah was built in 1914 by Capt. John L. Anderson at his shipyard on Lake Washington at Houghton, Washington. On launching, Issaquah slid down the shipway and then became stuck in the mud, and had to be towed off. The vessel is reported to have been acquired by Anderson Steamboat Company at a cost of $33,571 in May, 1914.

Her steam engines were manufactured by Seattle Machine Works. They had two cylinders, with bores of 9 inches (23 cm) and 18.25 inches (46.4 cm), and a stroke of 14 feet (4.3 m).

Captain Anderson was a prominent boatbuilder and steamboat operator on Lake Washington, and the Issaquah was the most elaborate vessel he had ever built. Issaquah was the first ferry built by a private owner in the Puget Sound region. Issaquah was also one of the first ferries in the region designed and constructed to transport automobiles. The upper deck included a hardwood dance floor which was used when the ferry was taken out on moonlight excursions.

== Lake Washington service ==
Issaquah was placed on the route running from Leschi to Mercer Island and then to Newport. In 1891 the eastern terminus of this route connected to a road that ran to Lake Sammamish, Fall City, Preston, Issaquah, North Bend, and Snoqualmie, Washington. It is doubtful whether Issaquah ever carried the full licensed complement of automobiles when on Lake Washington.

== California service ==
In 1917, the private ferry owners on Lake Washington, which meant Captain Anderson as a practical matter, were undercut by competition from King County. Another problem was that all of the company's docking facilities had to be reconstructed after the opening of the Lake Washington Ship Canal in 1916 caused the level of the water in Lake Washington to be lowered by 9 feet (2.74 metres).

As a result of these difficulties, Anderson was forced to leave the private ferry business. On September 30, 1917, Issaquah ceased operations on Lake Washington. After being operated during the month of November 1917 by the Seattle Port Commission, the vessel was sold in early 1918 to the Rodeo-Vallejo Ferry System, operating in northern San Francisco Bay.

The ferry departed from Houghton on May 30, 1918, having first been boarded up and loaded with cord wood for use as fuel. Issaquah steamed out to Neah Bay, where more wood was taken on and the ferry was taken in tow to San Francisco Bay. Two men stayed on Issaquah during the tow, keeping steam up and running the vessel's propellers, as the tug was insufficiently powerful to accomplish the task alone. The ferry arrived in good condition and began service on the Carquinez Strait on July 4, 1918.

The ferry remained in service under the name Issaquah in the Vallejo-Martinez area until after World War II. After the Carquinez Bridge was completed in 1927, the ferry was shifted to the Mare Island routes from Vallejo, Martinez, and Benicia. In 1948 the ferry was purchased by D. J. Arques, owner of a Sausalito shipyard, for $1,000.

Issaquah can be seen in the 1965 Jimmy Stewart movie "Dear Brigitte" beached on the mud behind the Charles van Damme at the northern end of the Sausalito waterfront.

== See also ==
- MV Issaquah, ferry built in 1979

== Disposition ==
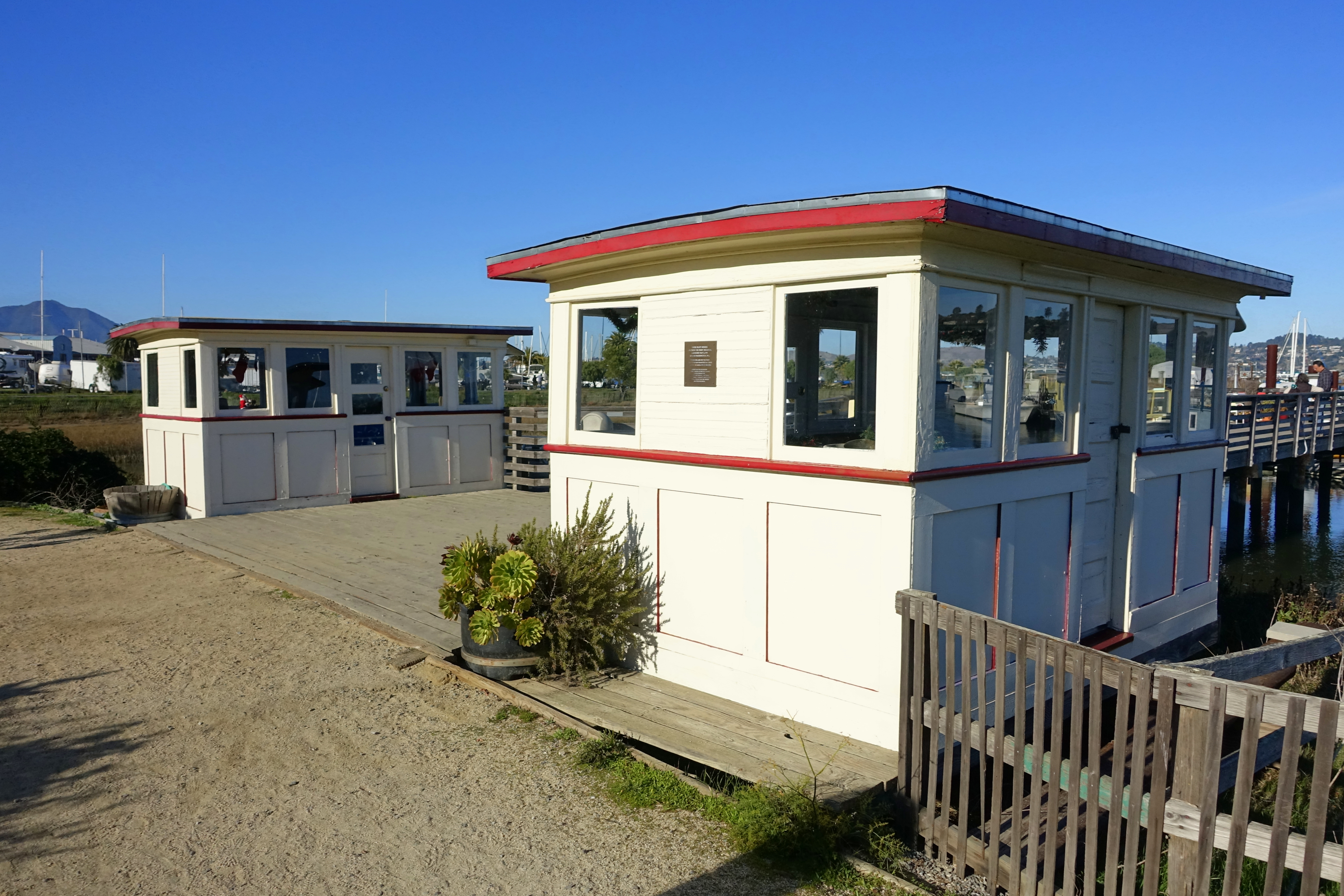
Issaquah pilot houses

The ferry ended up abandoned on a mud flat in Sausalito, California. In the 1970s the two pilot houses were salvaged from the mud flats and restored. They are the sole remnants of the vessel and as of 2011 are displayed as a museum attraction at 300 Napa Street, Sausalito, California.
