= Issaquah-class ferry =

Auto/passenger ferries operated by Washington State

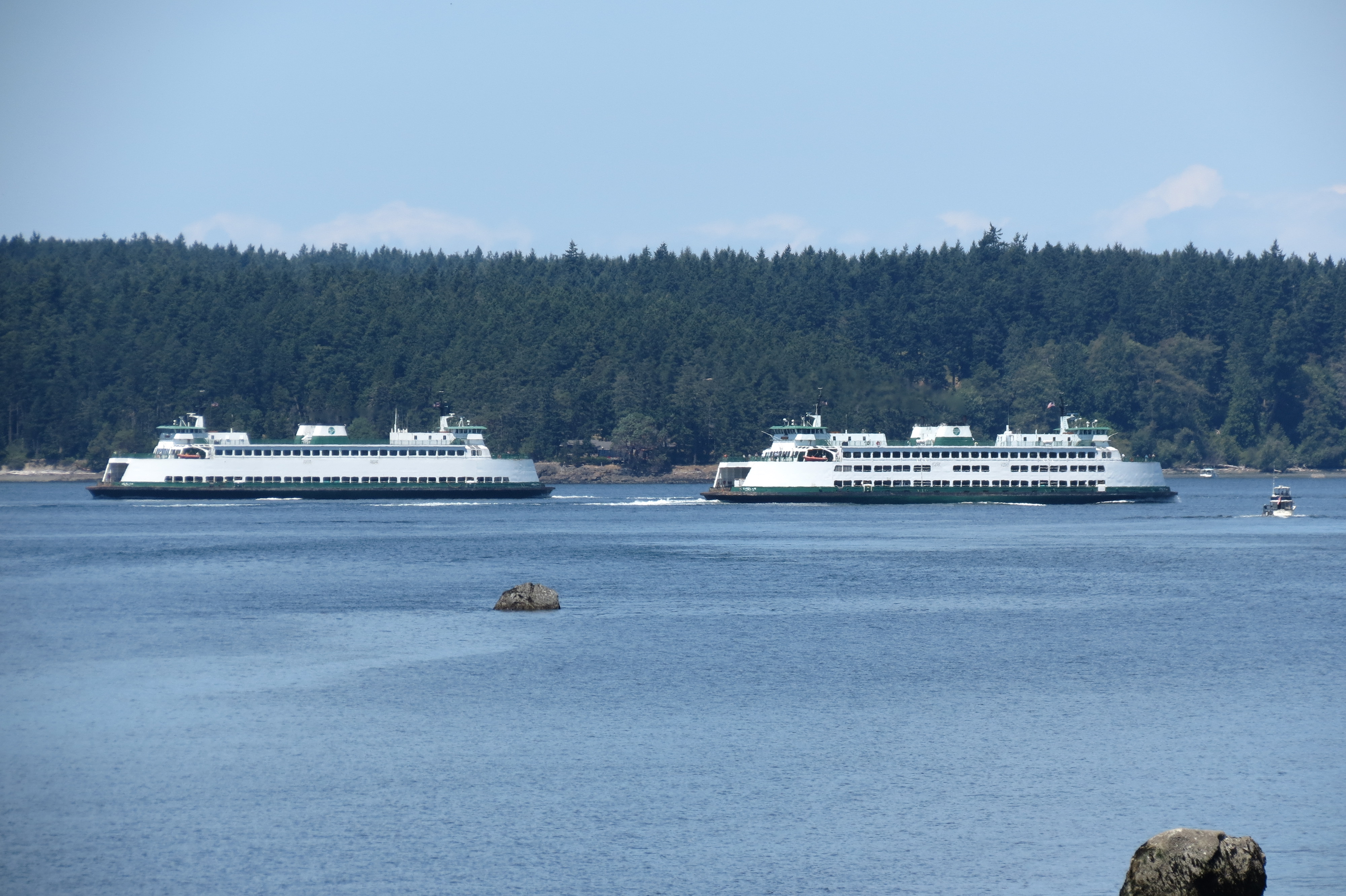
- The original Issaquah-class vessel Sealth at left with upgraded vessel Chelan at right

Class overview
- Builders: Marine Power and Equipment, Seattle, Washington
- Operators: Washington State Ferries
- Built: 1979–1982
- In service: May 1980–present
- Completed: 6
- Active: 6

General characteristics
- Type: Auto/passenger ferry
- Tonnage: 2,477 gross tonnage (GT)
- Displacement: 3,310 long tons of displacement
- Length: 328 ft (100 m)
- Beam: 78 ft 8 in (23.98 m)
- Decks: 3 or 4 (1 or 2 auto decks, passenger deck, nav bridge deck)
- Deck clearance: 15 ft 2 in–15 ft 10 in (4.6–4.8 m)
- Propulsion: 5,000 hp (3,700 kW) total from two diesel engines
- Speed: 16 knots (30 km/h; 18 mph)
- Capacity: 1,200 passengers (1,090 on international service); Sealth: 90 vehicles (30 tall vehicles); Others: 124 vehicles (24 tall vehicles)
- Crew: 14

The Issaquah class are a series of six auto and passenger ferries built for the Washington State Ferries system in the late 1970s until the early 1980s.

Originally, each vessel was built to accommodate 100 vehicles and 1,200 passengers but were built with accommodations to add an additional car deck. In the early to mid-1990s, five of the six vessels were modified with the additional car deck. The lone exception is the MV Sealth, which Washington State Ferries assigns to the San Juan Islands route in the summer, where her additional capacity for tall vehicles without the second deck has proven useful.

The Chelan was upgraded to international SOLAS safety standards in 2005, allowing her to make the crossing between Anacortes and Sidney, British Columbia.

== History ==
The Issaquah class got off to a problematic start, when the $106 million contract to build the six ferries was awarded to Marine Power and Equipment (MP&E) on April 6, 1978. The company had no prior experience building large vessels, and it was later revealed that some lawmakers may have personally benefited from the contract being awarded to MP&E.

As it built the Issaquah class, MP&E was accused of substituting cheap materials and cheap labor and groups said that it was enabled by poor oversight by the Washington State Department of Transportation. The largest problem with the ferries was the propulsion system. Prior vessels purchased for Washington State Ferries had used a diesel–electric transmission, where diesel engines turned an electric generator, which produced electricity, which in turn was used to power electric motors that turned the propellers. Instead MP&E chose a more traditional setup with diesel engines turning the propellers through a series of clutches and gearboxes, which turned out to be extremely problematic causing the vessels to ram the terminal piers, and in one case, inadvertently dropping into reverse while docked, causing a car to fall into the water.

== Vessels ==
Ferries in this class include:

- Cathlamet – (Auto capacity increased in 1993)
- Chelan – (Auto capacity increased in 2001, upgraded to meet SOLAS safety standards)
- Issaquah – (Auto capacity increased in 1989)
- Kitsap – (Auto capacity increased in 1992)
- Kittitas – (Auto capacity increased in 1990)
- Sealth
