= MV Sealth =

Auto/passenger ferry operated by Washington State

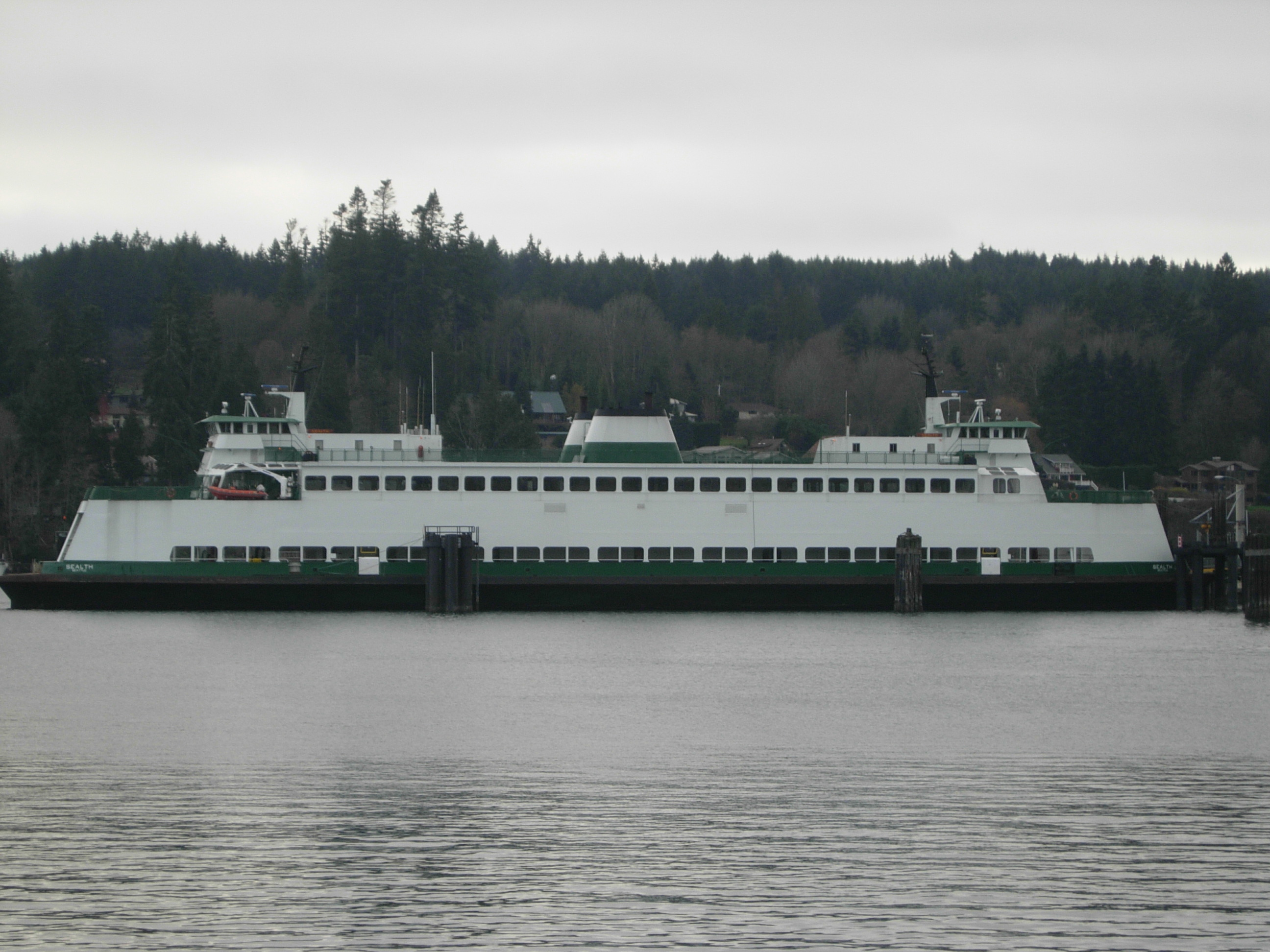
- MV Sealth docked at Bainbridge Island

History
- Name: Sealth
- Owner: WSDOT
- Operator: Washington State Ferries
- Port of registry: Seattle, Washington, United States
- Route: Seattle - Bremerton
- Builder: Marine Power and Equipment, Seattle
- Completed: 1982; Refit: 2006
- In service: 1985
- Identification: IMO number: 7808152; MMSI number: 366710820; Callsign: WAK7089; Official Number: 662478
- Status: In Service - Seattle - Bremerton

General characteristics
- Class & type: Issaquah-class auto/passenger ferry
- Displacement: 3,310 long tons (3,360 t)
- Length: 328 ft (100 m)
- Beam: 78 ft 8 in (23.98 m)
- Draft: 15 ft 6 in (4.72 m)
- Decks: 1 auto deck/1 passenger deck
- Deck clearance: 15 ft 2 in (4.62 m)
- Installed power: Total 5,000 hp (3,700 kW) from 2 diesel engines
- Propulsion: Diesel
- Speed: 16 knots (30 km/h; 18 mph)
- Capacity: 1,200 passengers; 90 vehicles (max 30 commercial)
- Crew: 10

MV Sealth is a Issaquah-class ferry operated by Washington State Ferries. She is named for Chief Sealth. The Sealth underwent cabin rebuilding in last 2006, after which she was in service on the Fauntleroy-Vashon-Southworth route. The Sealth was then the #2 vessel on the route. Earlier she was taken out of service due to a seam needing weld repairs.

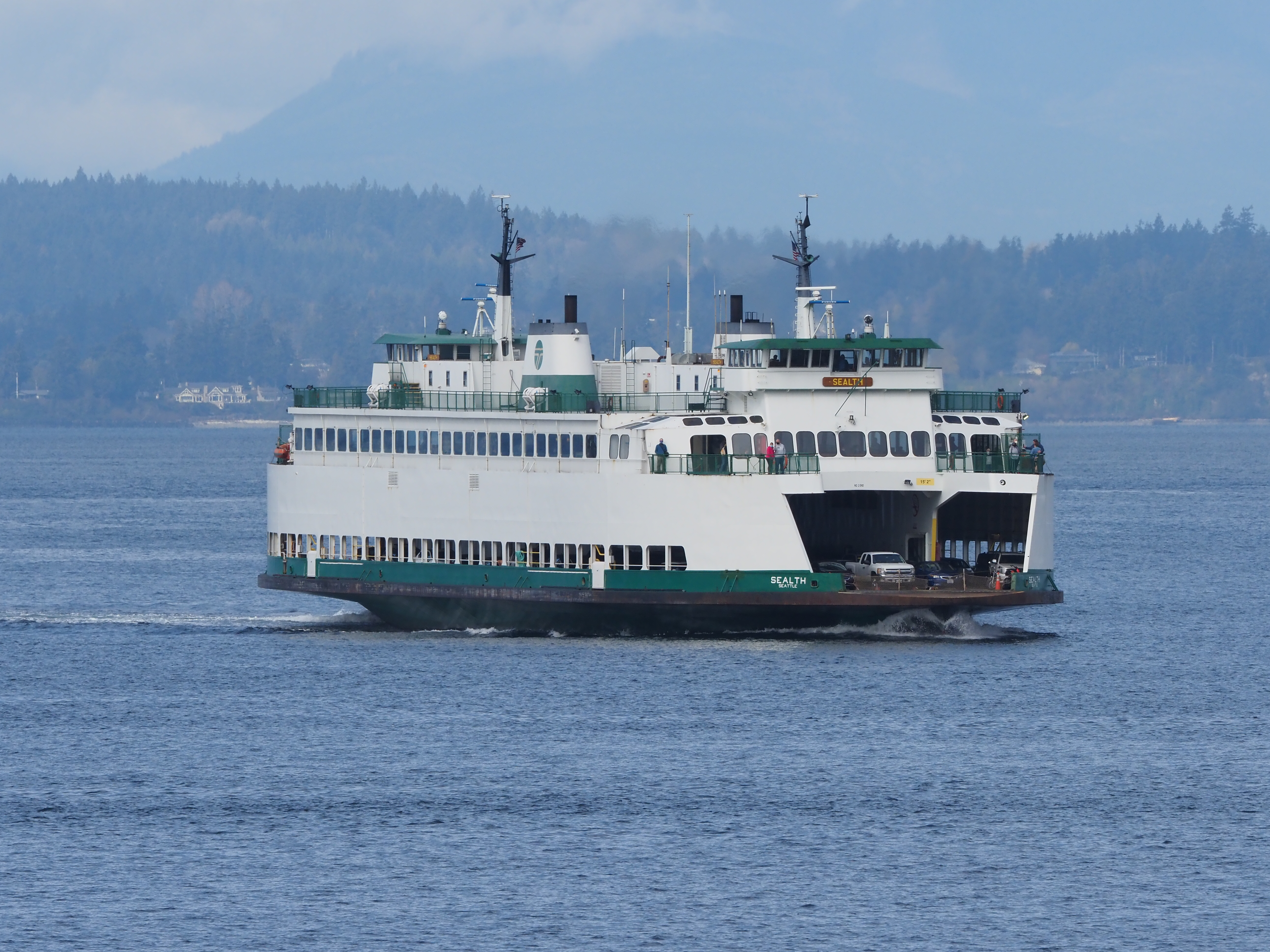
Sealth nearing Colman Dock

The Sealth was not listed to return to the San Juan Islands in late 2015. She was in service at Seattle/Bremerton and switched to the Vashon route mid-fall and she remained there until the Winter 2016 schedule began. She replaced the MV Klahowya as the inter-island ferry in the San Juans when it was retired. She is currently on the San Juan’s inter-island and San Juans Anacortes routes during low traffic times of day.

== Incidents ==
On November 7, 2012, the Sealth was serving the Bremerton run when a hole four feet under the waterline at No. 2 end port side was discovered. The ferry was pulled from service in the day and the leak was fixed a week later at Dakota Creek Shipyard of Anacortes. This caused the MV Salish to be put on the run, causing a loss of 30% percent of the run's regular car capacity.

In 1991, the Sealth collided with the MV Kitsap in Rich Passage in heavy fog. No major damage was reported.
