= MV Issaquah =

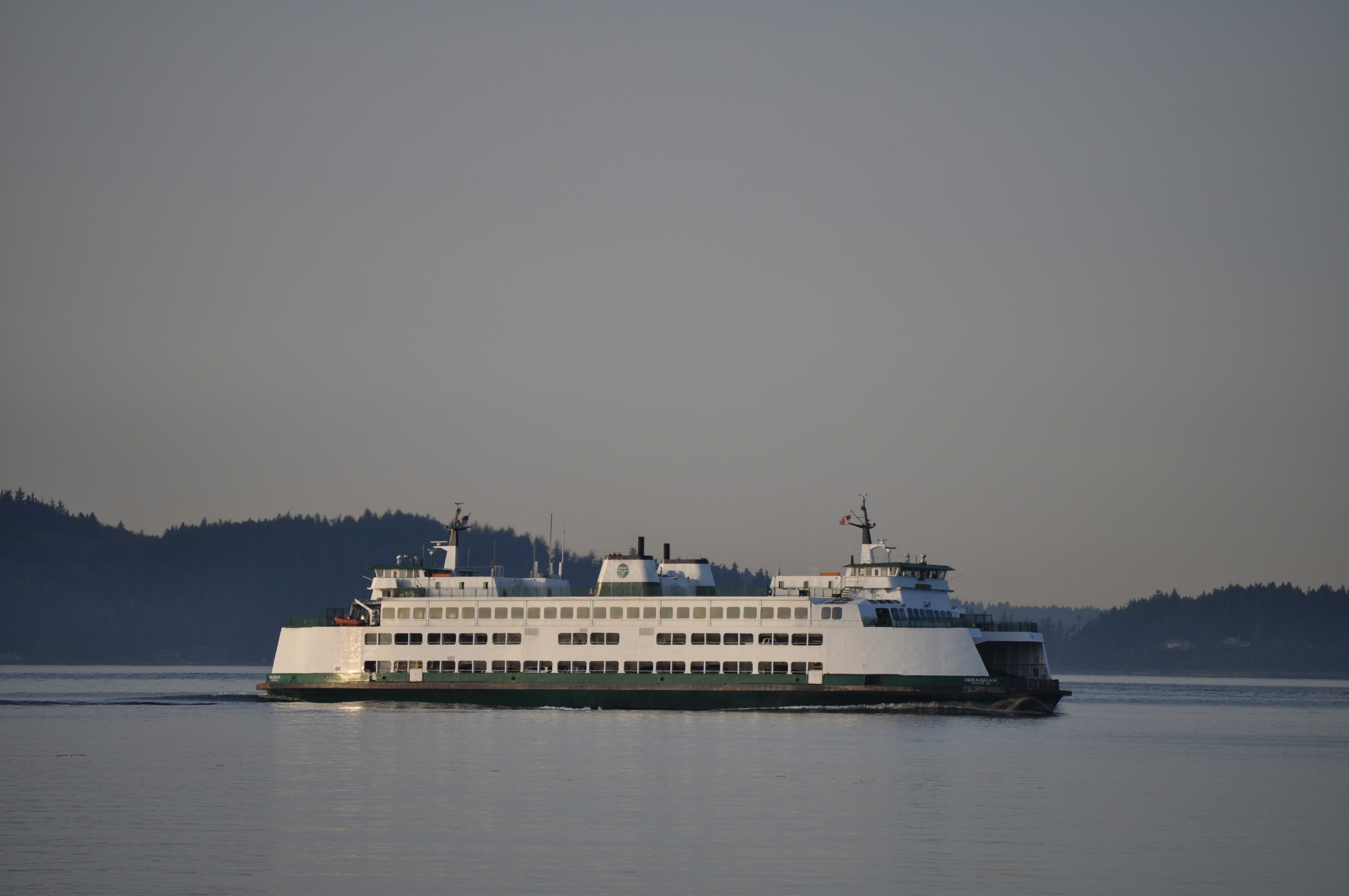
- The Issaquah

History
- Name: MV Issaquah
- Owner: WSDOT
- Operator: Washington State Ferries
- Port of registry: Seattle, Washington, United States
- Route: Fauntleroy- Vashon Island- Southworth (as of 30 September 2017)
- Ordered: 1979; Original 1978 plans and design shelved, redesigned and replanned 1979.
- Builder: Marine Power and Equipment, Seattle
- Cost: $36,000,000; Original 1978 cost $59,040,000
- Laid down: 1979
- Launched: 1979
- Christened: 1979
- Completed: 1979; Refit: 1989
- Acquired: 1979
- Maiden voyage: 1979
- In service: 1979
- Identification: IMO number: 7808102; MMSI number: 366773040; Callsign: WSD3625; Official Number: 624022
- Status: In Service

General characteristics
- Class & type: Issaquah-class auto/passenger ferry
- Displacement: 3,310 long tons (3,360 t)
- Length: 328 ft (100.0 m)
- Beam: 78 ft 8 in (24.0 m)
- Height: 81 ft 8 in (24.89 m)
- Draft: 16 ft 6 in (5.0 m)
- Decks: 2 car decks 1 passenger deck
- Deck clearance: 15 ft 8 in (4.8 m)
- Installed power: Total 5,000 hp (3,700 kW) from 2 diesel engines
- Propulsion: Diesel
- Speed: 16 knots (30 km/h; 18 mph)
- Capacity: 1,200 passengers; 124 vehicles (max 26 commercial)
- Crew: 12

MV Issaquah is an Issaquah-class ferry operated by Washington State Ferries.

The ferry spent her early years on the Seattle/Bremerton route, then shifted around the system for a time before being placed on the Southworth/Vashon/Fauntleroy route. She also occasionally serves the Mukilteo/Clinton and Anacortes/San Juan Islands route.

In 2025, a 7 feet (2.1 m) long, 2.5 feet (0.76 m) wide, and 2.5 feet (0.76 m) tall Lego model of the ship was installed on the passenger deck. The model, containing 37,000 Lego pieces and completed in 2001, was designed and built by a local architect who donated it to Washington State Ferries.
