= MV Tokitae =

Passenger ferry operated by Washington State Ferries

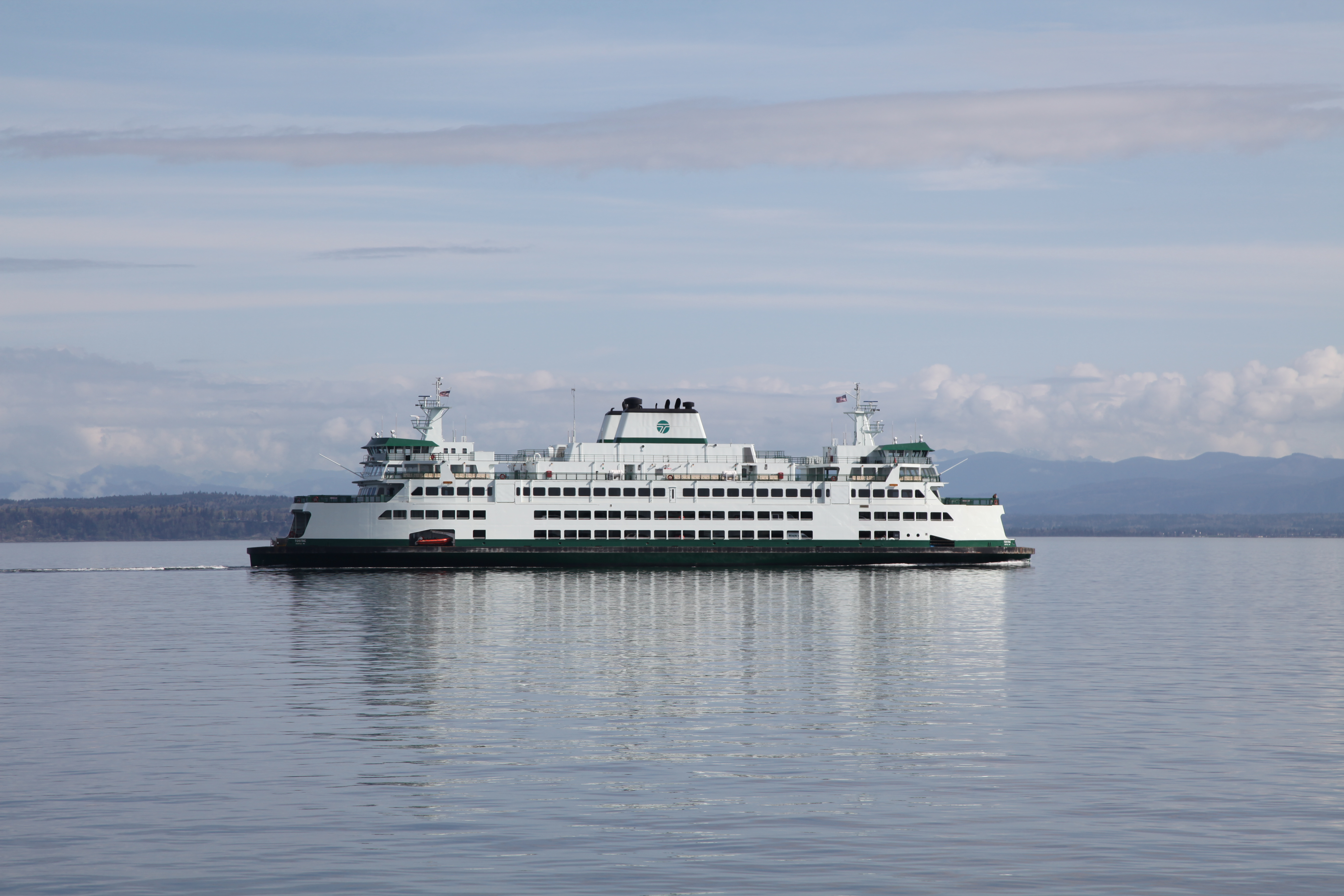
- Tokitae en route from Clinton to Mukilteo, 2015

History
- Name: Tokitae
- Owner: Washington State Department of Transportation
- Operator: Washington State Ferries
- Port of registry: Seattle, Washington, United States
- Ordered: 2011
- Builder: Vigor Shipyards, Seattle, Washington
- Cost: $144 million
- Laid down: March 29, 2012
- Launched: July 19, 2013
- Christened: March 20, 2014
- Maiden voyage: June 30, 2014
- In service: June 30, 2014
- Identification: Call sign: WDH3588; IMO number: 9720160; MMSI number: 367608860
- Status: In service

General characteristics
- Class & type: Olympic-class auto/passenger ferry
- Displacement: 4,384 LT (4,454 t)
- Length: 362 ft 3 in (110.4 m)
- Beam: 83 ft 2 in (25.3 m)
- Draft: 18 ft (5.5 m)
- Depth: 24 ft 6 in (7.5 m)
- Decks: 5 (2 vehicle decks, passenger deck, sun deck, nav bridge deck)
- Deck clearance: 16 ft (4.9 m)
- Installed power: 6,000 hp (4,500 kW) total from two EMD 12-710G7C diesel engines
- Propulsion: Diesel
- Speed: 17 knots (31 km/h; 20 mph)
- Capacity: 1,500 passengers; 144 vehicles (max 34 tall vehicles)
- Crew: 14 (12 with sun deck closed)

MV Tokitae is an Olympic-class passenger ferry operated by Washington State Ferries which entered service on June 30, 2014. It serves the Mukilteo-Clinton route.

== Naming ==
On November 13, 2012, the Washington State Transportation Commission named the ferry Tokitae. The word tokitae has been reported in media as a Chinook Jargon "greeting" that means "nice day, pretty colors." Its meaning is instead listed in Chinook Jargon dictionaries like Gibbs (1863) and Gill (1909) as simply "pretty." Gibbs lists it as Kalapuyan in origin and states that was not in common use by 1863.

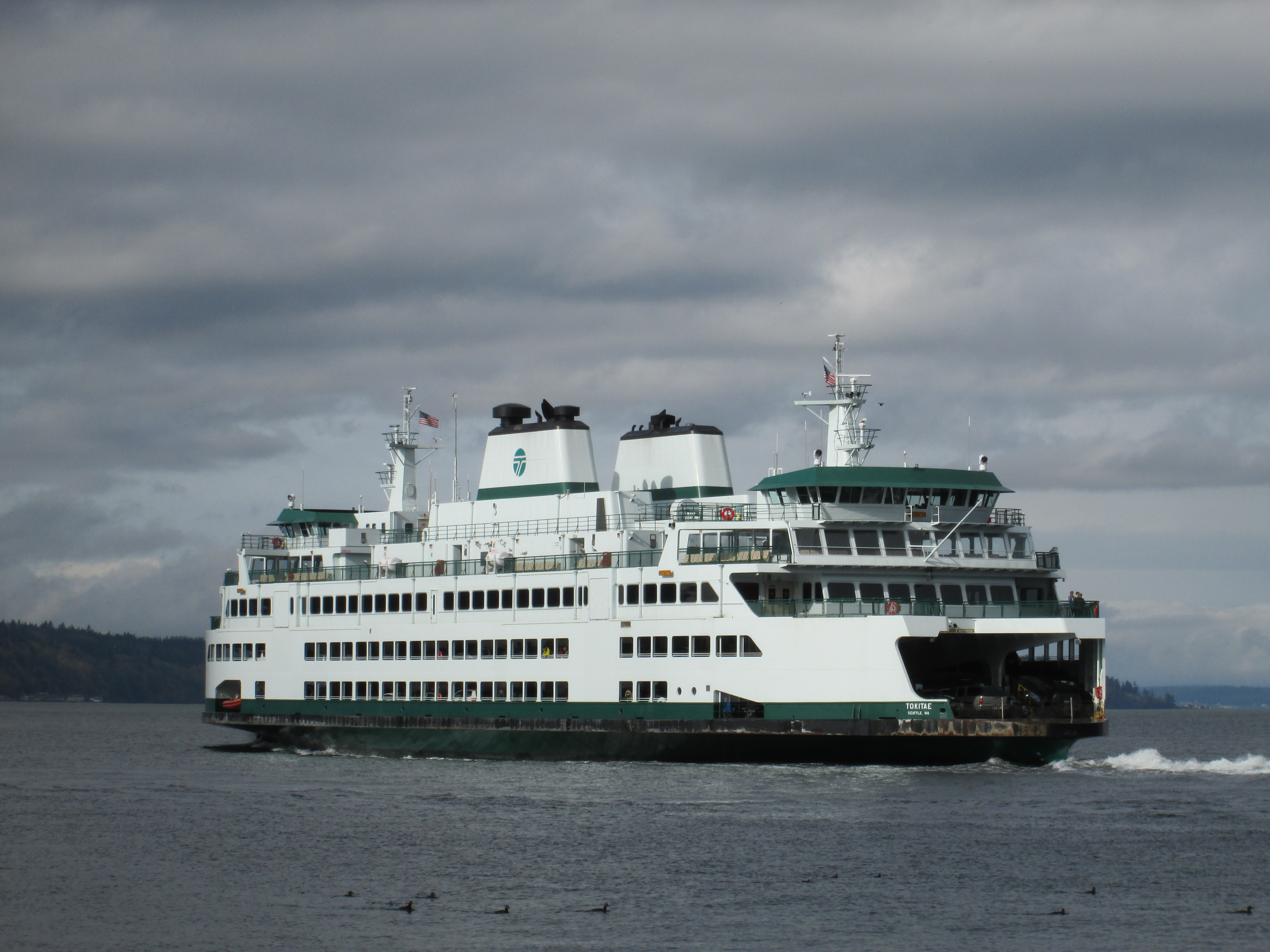
MV Tokitae en route to Clinton, Whidbey Island.

Tokitae was also the earliest name of an orca that had been captured in Penn Cove, Whidbey Island on August 8, 1970. Jesse White, the veterinarian who bought the captured orca in Seattle for the Miami Seaquarium, gave her that name, but she was renamed Lolita in Miami. Orca Network promoted the choice of Tokitae for the ferry under construction, to promote the cause of returning the captive orca to her natal waters, and the Washington state government was sympathetic. The ferry's route crosses a passage where the orca and her orca community were chased during her capture.

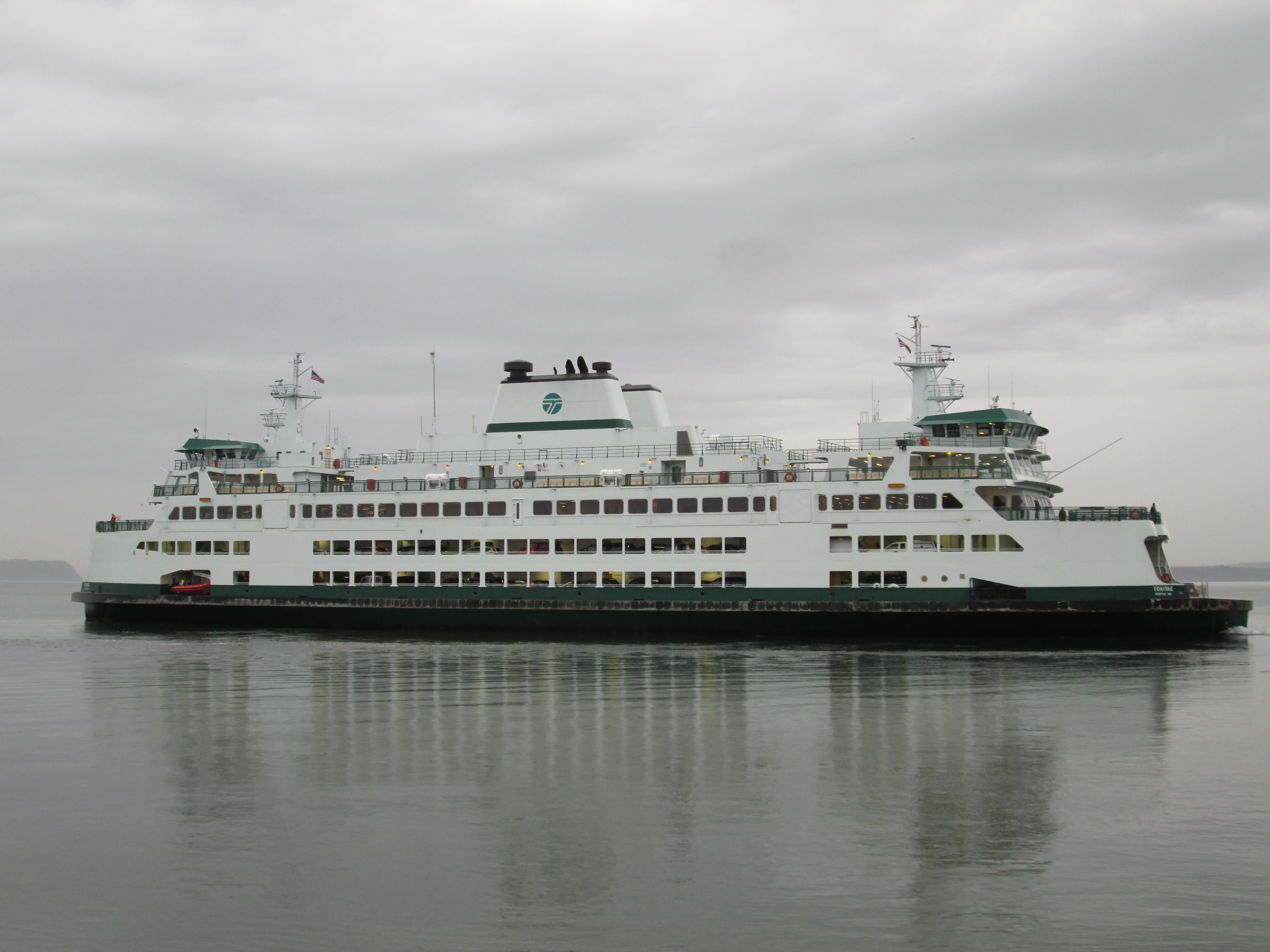
MV Tokitae departing Mukilteo

== History ==
=== Construction ===
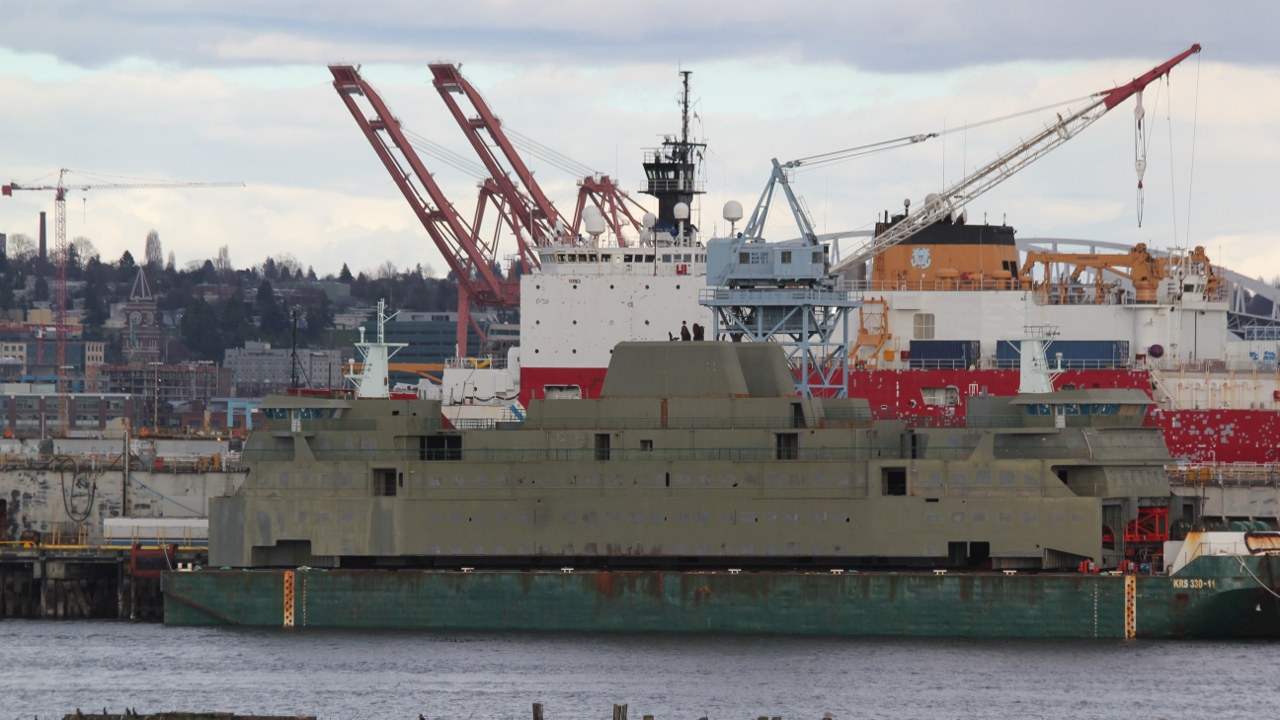
MV Tokitae's superstructure arriving at Vigor Shipyards in March 2013

The contracts for the Tokitae were signed on November 1, 2011, and its keel was laid on March 29, 2012.

The Tokitae's hull was rolled out of the Vigor construction building onto a drydock on March 2, 2013. It was joined by the completed superstructure the following week; it was built by Nichols Brothers Boat Builders of Freeland, a community on Whidbey Island.

The ferry was floated out of its dry dock and launched in Elliott Bay on July 19, 2013. The Tokitae was christened by state Secretary of Transportation Lynn Peterson on March 20, 2014 at Vigor, during a ceremony opened to the media, officials and workers.

=== Launch and early problems ===
The official public unveiling occurred on June 8, 2014, at the Clinton ferry terminal. The ferry made its maiden voyage on June 30, 2014. The Tokitae's first week of service was marred by a hydraulic leak and a design flaw that caused cars to scrape against the car ramps. In the vessel's first 13 months it lost propulsion a total of 18 times.
