= SkyKing =

SkyKing may refer to:

== Airlines ==
- SkyKing Limited, a defunct airline formerly based on the Turks and Caicos Islands (merged into Air Turks and Caicos)
- Sky King, Inc., a charter airline based in the United States

== Other uses ==
- Nickname for Richard Russell, American airport ground operator involved in the 2018 Horizon Air Q400 incident
- Skyking (film), a 2026 documentary film about the 2018 Horizon Air Q400 incident
- Skyking messages, a type of communication that can interrupt an Emergency Action Message
