= Longbranch, Washington =

Unincorporated community in Washington, United States

Longbranch
- Unincorporated community and Census-designated place
- Location within the state of Washington
- Coordinates: 47°14′20″N 122°45′20″W
- Country: United States
- State: Washington
- County: Pierce

Area
  - Total: 20.01 sq mi (51.8 km^{2})
  - Land: 19.69 sq mi (51.0 km^{2})
  - Water: 0.32 sq mi (0.83 km^{2})
- Elevation: 190 ft (58 m)
- Time zone: UTC-8 (Pacific (PST))
  - Summer (DST): UTC-7 (PDT)
- ZIP codes: 98351
- Area code: 253
- GNIS feature ID: 2584999

Longbranch is an unincorporated community and census-designated place in Pierce County, Washington, United States. It is located on the Key Peninsula, along Filucy Bay between Pitt Passage and Balch Passage. Longbranch is primarily residential (like nearby Home and Lakebay) and includes a marina, church, and community center.

As of the 2020 census, Longbranch had a population of 4,141.

The community was named after Long Branch, New Jersey.

== History ==
In 1934, Longbranch was linked by ferry service with Steilacoom, Anderson and McNeil islands. The ferry continues in operation, but no longer connects to Longbranch.

== Demographics ==
Historical population
Census	Pop.	Note	%±
2010	3,784		—
2020	4,141		9.4%
U.S. Decennial Census; 2000 2010

Long Branch first appeared as a census designated place in the 2010 U.S. census.

=== Racial and ethnic composition ===
Longbranch CDP, Washington – Racial and ethnic composition Note: the US Census treats Hispanic/Latino as an ethnic category. This table excludes Latinos from the racial categories and assigns them to a separate category. Hispanics/Latinos may be of any race.
Race / Ethnicity (NH = Non-Hispanic)	Pop 2010	Pop 2020	% 2010	% 2020
White alone (NH)	3,333	3,295	88.08%	79.57%
Black or African American alone (NH)	35	45	0.92%	1.09%
Native American or Alaska Native alone (NH)	60	79	1.59%	1.91%
Asian alone (NH)	59	65	1.56%	1.57%
Native Hawaiian or Pacific Islander alone (NH)	8	17	0.21%	0.41%
Other race alone (NH)	5	35	0.13%	0.85%
Mixed race or Multiracial (NH)	140	334	3.70%	8.07%
Hispanic or Latino (any race)	144	271	3.81%	6.54%
Total	3,784	4,141	100.00%	100.00%
