= Cody Balogh =

American football player (born 1986)

No. 79
- Position: Offensive tackle

Personal information
- Born: February 14, 1986 (age 40); Fort Benning, Georgia
- Listed height: 6 ft 6 in (1.98 m)
- Listed weight: 303 lb (137 kg)

Career information
- High school: Steilacoom (WA)
- College: Montana
- NFL draft: 2008: undrafted

Career history
- Chicago Bears (2008–2009)*
- * Offseason or practice squad member only

Career NFL statistics
- Games played: —
- Games started: —
- Fumble recoveries: —

Cody Balogh (born February 14, 1986) is an American former professional football offensive lineman. He was signed by the Bears as an undrafted free agent in 2008. He played college football at Montana.

== Early life ==
Cody was first-team all-conference at Steilacoom High School, in Steilacoom, Washington, on both offense and defense in both his junior and senior years, respectively. He was named a first-team all-state by the Tacoma News Tribune and participated in the Washington All-Star Game as a senior. He also was a two-year starter in basketball and played on a team that was ranked No. 2 in the state his senior year.

== College career ==
Cody attended the University of Montana, where he was a four-year letterwinner (2004–07). He started the final 41 games of his college career. He was an honorable mention all-Big Sky as a senior, starting all 12 games, 11 while playing at left tackle, and 1 while playing at left guard. He served as the Grizzlies captain as Montana went 11–0 and won the Big Sky title. He was also selected as the Paul Weskamp Award winner, which is given annually to Montana's Outstanding Offensive Lineman. He was named a third-team All-American by The Sports Network as a junior, and started all 14 games at left tackle and was a first-team all-Big Sky selection. He also helped lead the Grizzlies to a 10–1 regular season record (only losing an away game to the Iowa Hawkeyes), a Big Sky Championship, and an appearance in the National Semifinals. As a sophomore, Balogh started all 12 games helping the Grizzlies to qualify for the NCAA Tournament, but the Grizzlies fell in the first round. Balogh started the final 3 games of his freshman season, including the quarterfinal, semifinal and Division I-AA Championship Game which Montana lost, 31–21, to James Madison.

== Professional career ==
=== Chicago Bears ===
Balogh was undrafted in the 2008 NFL draft. In May 2008, Balogh tried out for the Chicago Bears in their annual rookie minicamp following the draft. After the rookie minicamp, Balogh was signed as an undrafted free agent. His arrival on the scene was considered a "nice surprise" by the Chicago Sun-Times.

After spending his rookie season on the practice squad, Balogh was re-signed to a future contract on December 29, 2008. Cody was waived on the September 5 cutdown to the 53 man regular season roster.

== Personal ==
Cody is the son of Steven and Patricia Balogh. In college, he majored in health and human performance.
