= Ketron Island, Washington =

Coordinates: 47°09′25″N 122°38′05″W

Ketron Island, Washington saʔilc
- CDP
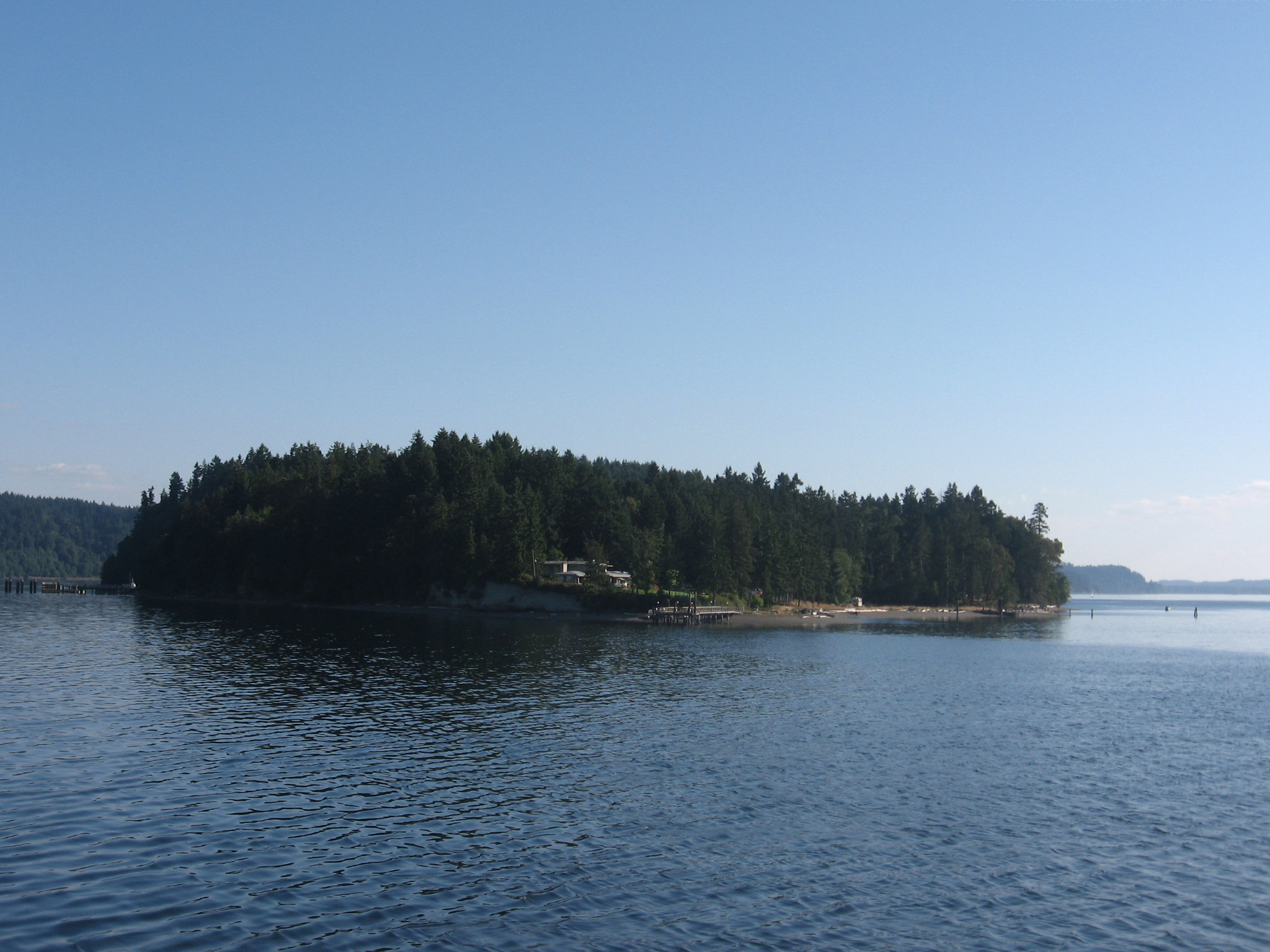
- Interactive map of Ketron Island, Washington
- Country: United States
- State: Washington
- County: Pierce
- Elevation: 256 ft (78 m)

Population (2020)
  - Total: 20
- Time zone: UTC-8 (Pacific (PST))
  - Summer (DST): UTC-7 (PDT)
- ZIP code: 98388
- Area code: 253
- GNIS feature ID: 2584988

Ketron Island (Lushootseed: saʔilc) is an island and a census-designated place (CDP) in Pierce County, Washington, United States. The island had a population of 17 people according to the 2010 census, and 20 people at the 2020 census.

Ketron Island is located in southern Puget Sound just off the shoreline from Steilacoom. It lies between the mainland near the city of Steilacoom and Anderson Island near the extreme south end of Puget Sound. The island has a land area of 221 acres (89 hectares). The former Washington State Ferries vessel, the MV Olympic, lies in her final resting place on the eastern shore of the island, near the ferry terminal.

== History ==
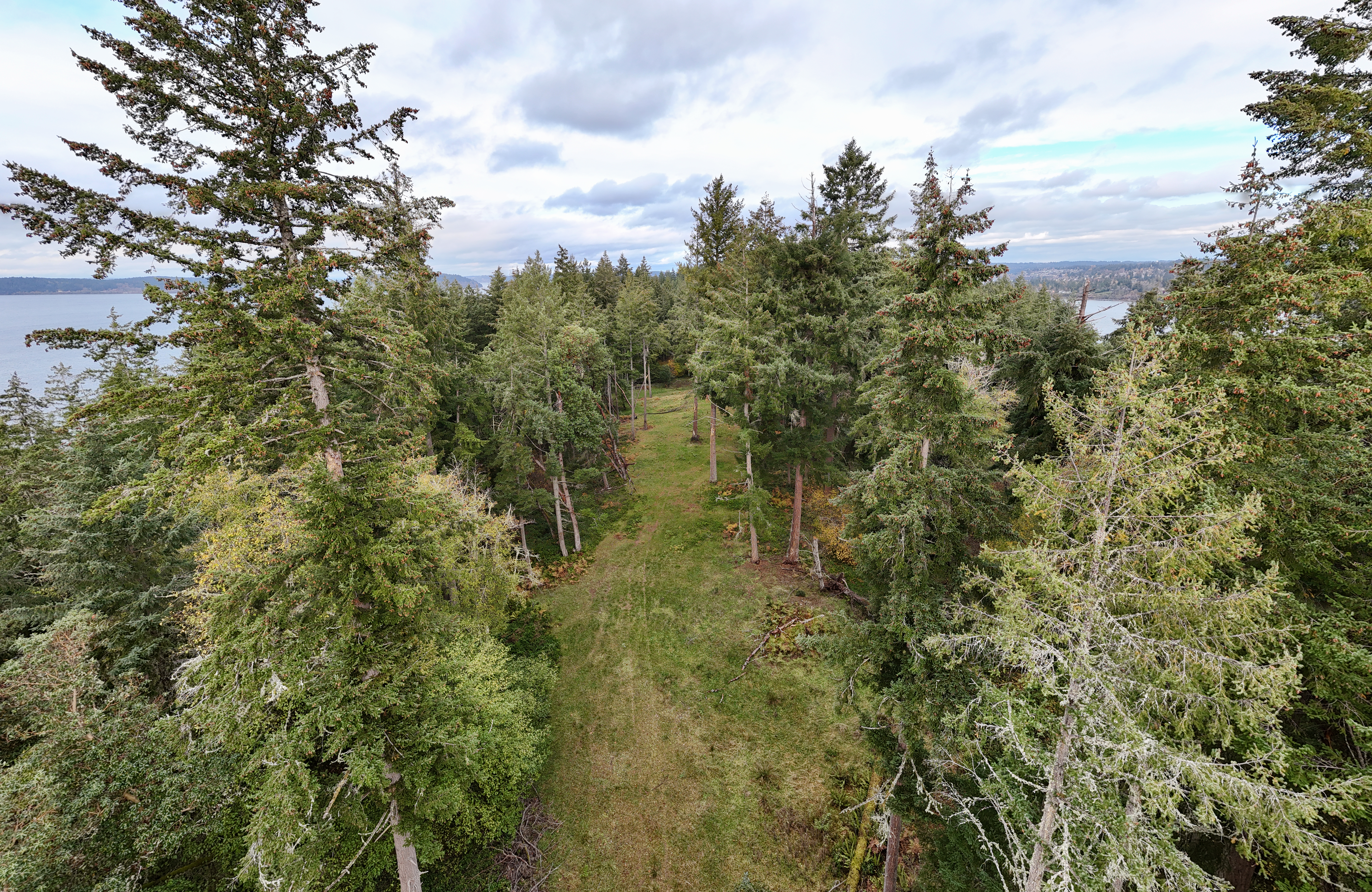
Crash site of the 2018 Horizon Air Q400 incident

The British explorer and navigator George Vancouver camped on Ketron Island in May of 1792.

The island's name in the Lushootseed language is saʔilc, meaning "bad rock". The island was originally named "Kittson Island" in English by Charles Wilkes during the Wilkes Expedition of 1838–1842, but was misspelled "Ketron" by his cartographers. The island was named for William Kittson, an employee of the Hudson's Bay Company, who supervised the construction of Fort Nisqually in 1833 and served as its chief factor.

The entire island was bought by an entrepreneur in 1946 with plans to build 200 homes, but this attempt was abandoned due to the cost of a sewer system.

On August 10, 2018, an empty Horizon Air Q400 was stolen from Seattle–Tacoma International Airport and crashed on the southern tip of Ketron Island, killing the sole occupant, Richard Russell, also known as the "Sky King".

== Demographics ==
Historical population
Census	Pop.	Note	%±
2010	17		—
2020	20		17.6%
U.S. Decennial Census; 2000 2010

Ketron Island first appeared as a census designated place in the 2010 U.S. census.

=== Racial and ethnic composition ===
Ketron Island CDP, Washington – Racial and ethnic composition Note: the US Census treats Hispanic/Latino as an ethnic category. This table excludes Latinos from the racial categories and assigns them to a separate category. Hispanics/Latinos may be of any race.
Race / Ethnicity (NH = Non-Hispanic)	Pop 2010	Pop 2020	% 2010	% 2020
White alone (NH)	14	14	82.35%	70.00%
Black or African American alone (NH)	1	0	5.88%	0.00%
Native American or Alaska Native alone (NH)	0	0	0.00%	0.00%
Asian alone (NH)	0	0	0.00%	0.00%
Native Hawaiian or Pacific Islander alone (NH)	0	0	0.00%	0.00%
Other race alone (NH)	1	0	5.88%	0.00%
Mixed race or Multiracial (NH)	0	4	0.00%	20.00%
Hispanic or Latino (any race)	1	2	5.88%	10.00%
Total	17	20	100.00%	100.00%

== Transportation ==
Ketron is accessible only by ferry. The Steilacoom/Anderson Island/Ketron Island run is the only one operated by Pierce County. The ferry service to Ketron is available four times per day. The ferry runs between 5:45 AM to 8:00 PM Monday through Sunday.

The ferry Steilacoom II was put into service in January 2007 to work side by side with the aging ferry Christine Anderson. The Steilacoom II still serves with the Christine Anderson to transport islanders from both Ketron and Anderson Island.

== Education ==
The island is served by the Steilacoom Historical School District. Steilacoom High School is the district's comprehensive high school.
