= Emeka Egbuka =

American football player (born 2002)

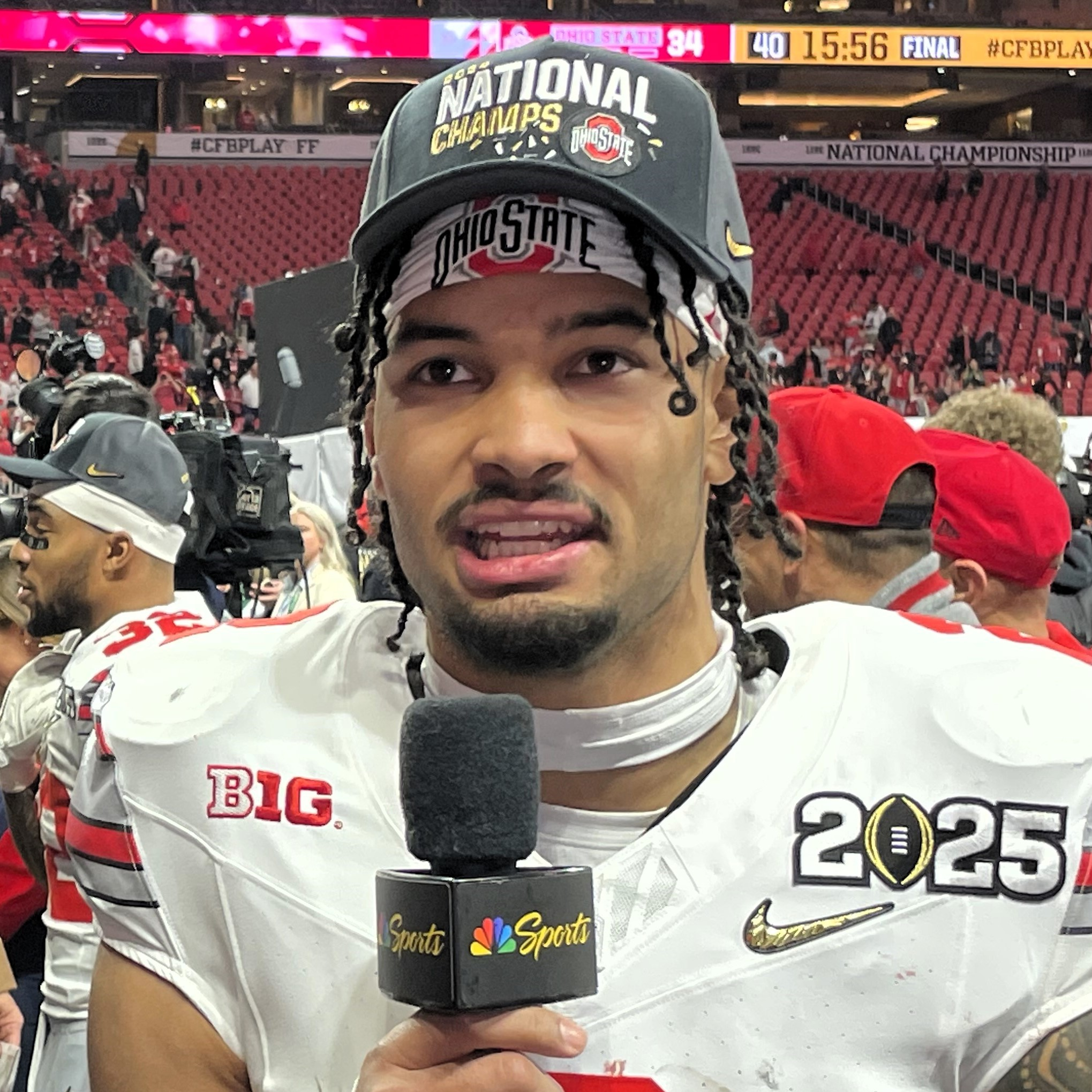
- Egbuka after National Championship game with Ohio State Buckeyes in 2025

No. 2 – Tampa Bay Buccaneers
- Position: Wide receiver
- Roster status: Active

Personal information
- Born: October 14, 2002 (age 24); Tacoma, Washington, U.S.
- Listed height: 6 ft 1 in (1.85 m)
- Listed weight: 205 lb (93 kg)

Career information
- High school: Steilacoom (Steilacoom, Washington)
- College: Ohio State (2021–2024)
- NFL draft: 2025: 1st round, 19th overall pick

Career history
- Tampa Bay Buccaneers (2025–present)

Awards and highlights
- PFWA All-Rookie Team (2025); CFP national champion (2024); Second-team All-Big Ten (2022); 2× Third-team All-Big Ten (2023, 2024)

Career NFL statistics as of Week 7, 2026
- Receptions: 91
- Receiving yards: 1,178
- Receiving touchdowns: 8
- Stats at Pro Football Reference

Emeka Egbuka (born October 14, 2002) is an American professional football wide receiver for the Tampa Bay Buccaneers of the National Football League (NFL). He played college football for the Ohio State Buckeyes, finishing as their career receptions leader prior to being selected by the Buccaneers in the first round of the 2025 NFL draft.

== Early life ==
Egbuka was born in Tacoma, Washington and grew up in Steilacoom, Washington. He began playing football at a young age, and initially wanted to play college football for the Oregon Ducks. His admiration for the program came from their uniforms and his idolization of late Ducks linebacker Fotu Leiato, a fellow Steilacoom native and childhood mentor of Egbuka. He attended Steilacoom High School and was named the Washington Gatorade Player of the Year as a junior after he caught 83 passes for 1,607 yards and 25 touchdowns and compiled 2,240 all-purpose yards with three punt return touchdowns and four rushing touchdowns. Egbuka was also a standout baseball athlete, playing center fielder throughout his youth career. When he was 8 years old, he won the MLB's Pitch, Hit & Run competition for his age group. Egbuka credits baseball as a contributor for his athleticism, and claims it helped him develop into a better wide receiver. Egbuka was rated a five-star recruit and committed to play college football at Ohio State.

== College career ==
Egbuka joined the Ohio State Buckeyes as an early enrollee in January 2021, forgoing his senior season at Steilacoom which had been moved to the spring due to COVID-19. He played in 11 games as a freshman and caught nine passes for 191 yards. He also returned 20 kickoffs for 580 yards and was named honorable mention All-Big Ten Conference. As a sophomore in 2022, Egbuka recorded over 1,000 receiving yards. He set the school's career receptions record during his 2024 senior season with 205.

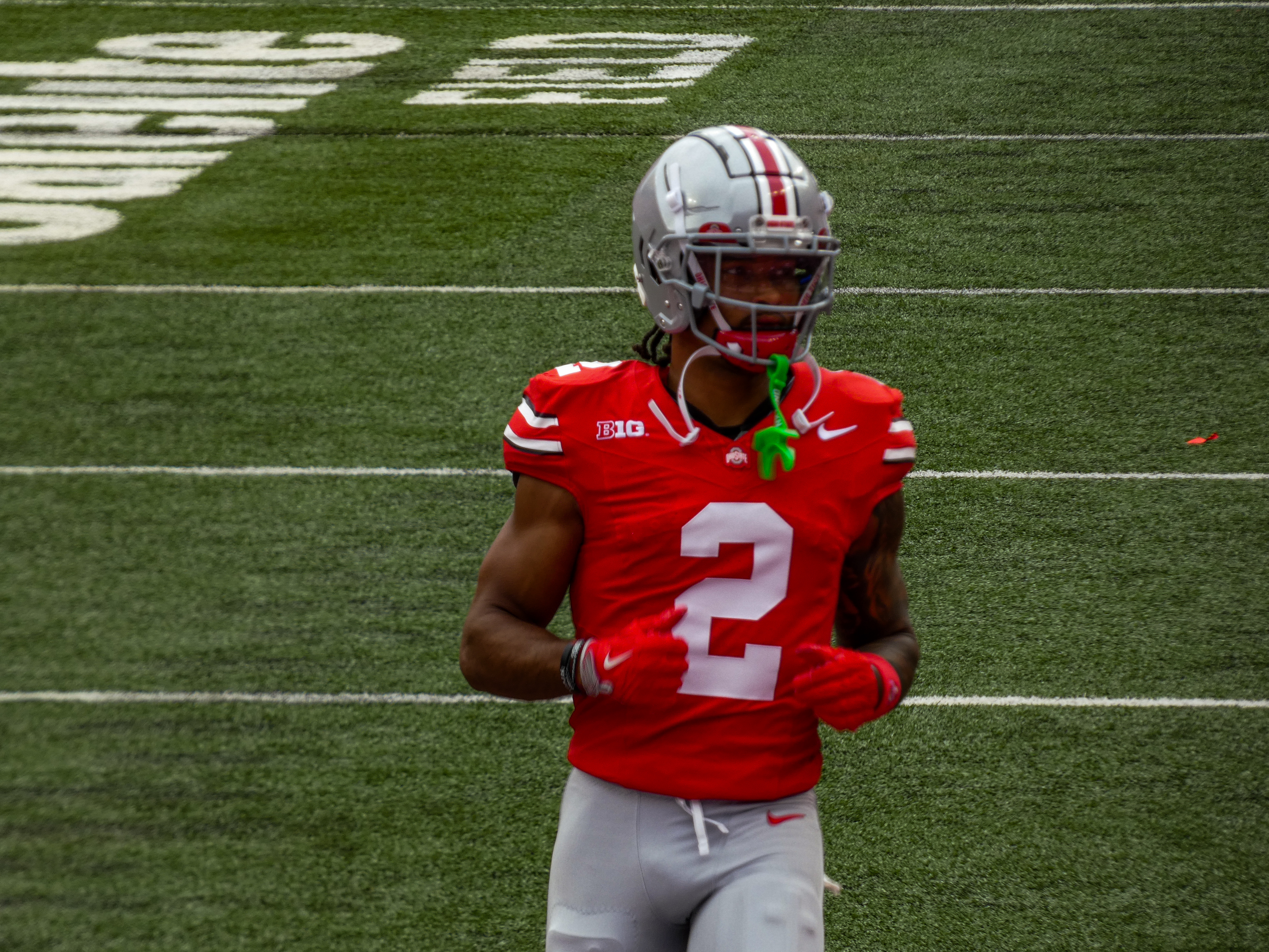
Egbuka with Ohio State in 2024

== Professional career ==
Pre-draft measurables
Height	Weight	Arm length	Hand span	Wingspan	40-yard dash	10-yard split	20-yard split	20-yard shuttle	Vertical jump
6 ft 0 7/8 in (1.85 m)	202 lb (92 kg)	31 1/2 in (0.80 m)	9 5/8 in (0.24 m)	6 ft 4 5/8 in (1.95 m)	4.45 s	1.50 s	2.57 s	4.12 s	38 in (0.97 m)
All values from NFL Combine/Pro Day

Egbuka was selected in the first round with the 19th overall pick by the Tampa Bay Buccaneers in the 2025 NFL draft. In his NFL debut against the Atlanta Falcons, Egbuka had four receptions for 67 yard and two touchdown catches, one of them being the game-winning score.

On October 2, 2025, Egbuka was named the NFL's Offensive Rookie of the Month for September. The following Sunday, a clip from the NFL on Fox postgame show went viral in which Rob Gronkowski mispronounced Egbuka's name, calling him "Emeka Egbegboo." He finished the 2025 season with 63 receptions for 938 yards and six touchdowns as a rookie.

== Career statistics ==
=== NFL ===
Legend
**Bold**	Career high

Year	Team	Games		Receiving					Rushing					Fumbles	
Year	Team	GP	GS	Rec	Yds	Avg	Lng	TD	Att	Yds	Avg	Lng	TD	Fum	Lost
2025	TB	17	13	63	938	14.9	77	6	2	9	4.5	9	0	0	0
2026	TB	2	2	8	79	9.9	17	1	1	-3	-3.0	-3	0	0	0
Career		19	15	71	1,017	14.3	77	7	3	6	2.0	9	0	0	0

=== College ===
College statistics
Year	Team	GP	Receiving				Rushing				Kick returns				Punt returns			
Year	Team	GP	Rec	Yds	Avg	TD	Att	Yds	Avg	TD	Ret	Yds	Avg	TD	Ret	Yds	Avg	TD
2021	Ohio State	11	9	191	**21.2**	0	—	—	—	—	**20**	**580**	**29.0**	0	—	—	—	—
2022	Ohio State	13	74	**1,151**	15.6	**10**	**11**	**87**	**7.9**	**2**	1	25	25.0	0	**11**	**75**	**6.8**	0
2023	Ohio State	10	41	515	12.6	4	5	25	5.0	0	—	—	—	—	7	23	3.3	0
2024	Ohio State	**16**	**81**	1,011	12.5	**10**	8	33	4.1	0	1	16	16.0	0	1	-1	-1.0	0
Career		49	205	2,868	14.0	24	24	145	6.0	2	22	621	28.2	0	19	97	5.1	0

== Personal life ==
Egbuka's grandfather Ron Frederick was elected mayor of DuPont, Washington, in 2020. Egbuka is of Igbo Nigerian descent through his father. He got engaged to soccer player Laney Egbuka (née Matriano) in January 2026. The couple married on July 3, 2026. Egbuka is a Christian.
