= MV Olympic =

Former ferry used on Puget Sound

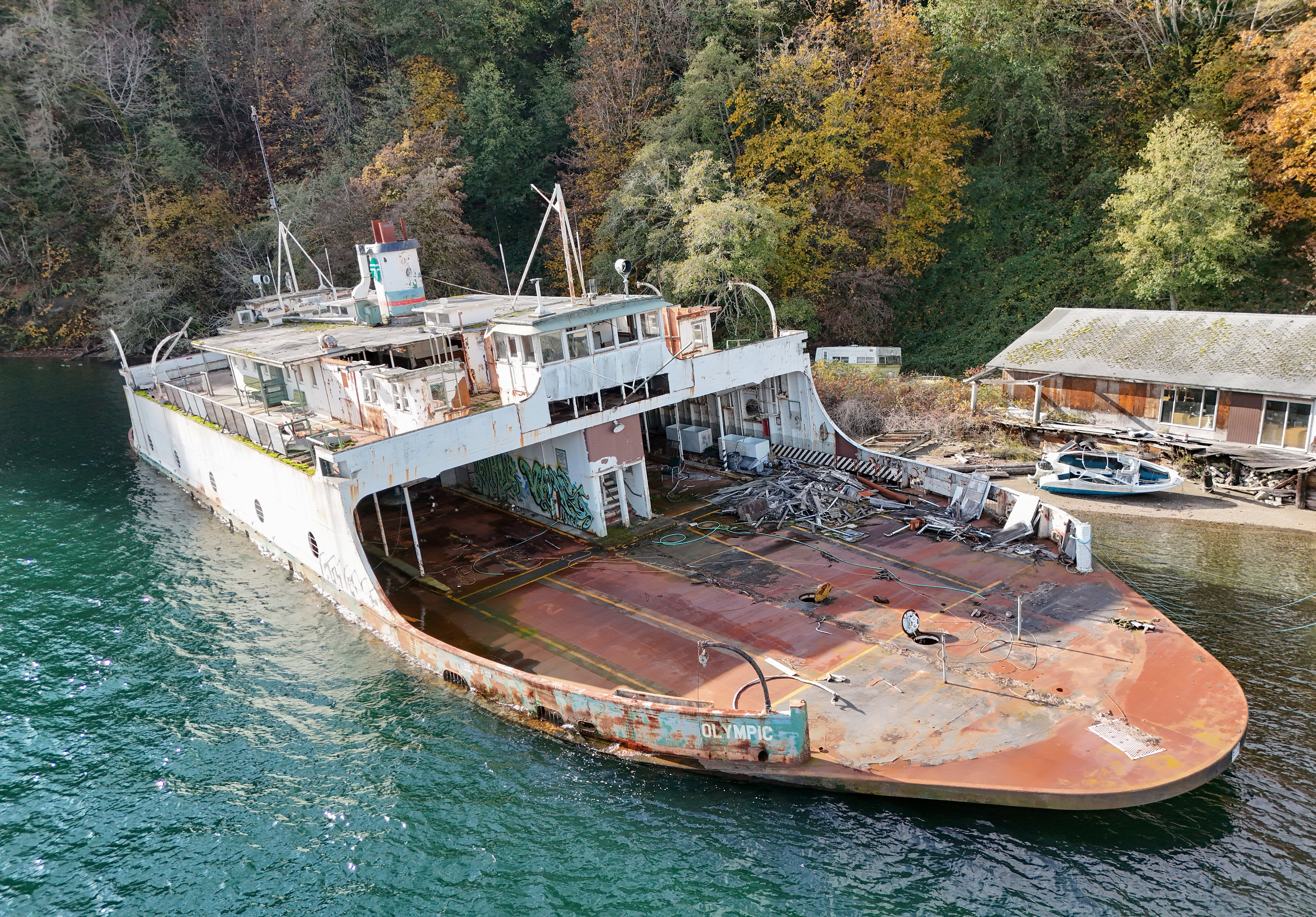
- Olympic beached off Ketron Island, 2024

History
- Name: Governor Harry W. Nice
- Operator: Claiborne–Annapolis Ferry Company
- Route: Chesapeake Bay
- Builder: Maryland Drydock Company
- Launched: December 11, 1937
- In service: 1938
- Name: Olympic
- Owner: Washington State Department of Transportation
- Route: Various Puget Sound routes
- Acquired: 1951
- In service: 1954
- Out of service: 1993
- Status: Abandoned off Ketron Island

General characteristics
- Type: Auto/passenger ferry
- Length: 206 ft (63 m)
- Capacity: About 600 passengers, 50 cars

MV Olympic (also known as Olympic II) is a former automobile ferry that operated in Maryland and Washington state. Originally named the MV Gov. Harry W. Nice, it was built for the Claiborne–Annapolis Ferry Company on Chesapeake Bay in Maryland and operated there from 1937 to 1952. The ferry was then sold to the Washington State Ferries system and rechristened as the Olympic, named for the Olympic Mountains, and served various route until 1993. Olympic was sold in 1997 and has been beached on Ketron Island since 2010.

== Service ==
=== Governor Harry W. Nice ===
The vessel was launched on December 11, 1937, at the Maryland Drydock Company and entered service as the motor ferry Governor Harry W. Nice on the Chesapeake Bay, operating for the Claiborne–Annapolis Ferry Company.

Following the opening of the Chesapeake Bay Bridge in 1952, Maryland's transbay ferry operations ended and the vessels were sold.

=== Washington State Ferries ===
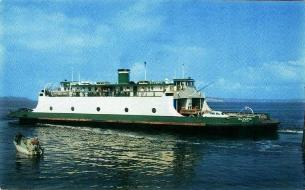
The vessel operating in Washington

Washington State Ferries (WSF) acquired the vessel, renamed it Olympic, and placed it into service in 1954. The ferry operated on several Puget Sound routes as a single-engine automobile ferry with a capacity of approximately 600 passengers and 50 vehicles. Olympic was retired from service in 1993.

In 1997, the state declared Olympic surplus and sold it at auction to Bainbridge Island resident Darrell McNabb for $71,000. McNabb proposed rehabilitating the vessel for reuse and kept Olympic moored in Eagle Harbor. He later offered the ferry for sale and donated it to the Pacific Maritime Foundation for resale. The vessel was listed for sale on eBay in 2009 and on the foundation's website but remained moored in Eagle Harbor.

== Abandonment ==
In May 2010, Olympic was purchased by Tom Palmer and towed south for relocation and potential reuse. During the transit, the ferry ran aground along the shoreline off Ketron Island. The vessel later broke free from its initial grounding during a windstorm and shifted position, prompting responses and investigations by authorities concerning shoreline impacts, navigational safety, and the condition of its moorings.

The ferry has remained beached since 2010. Its size has complicated removal efforts, and because the vessel rests on private property, legal authority and access have further limited the ability of public agencies. Pierce County declared the former ferry a "public nuisance"; however, efforts to require removal or disposal have failed, and the vessel continues to deteriorate in place.
