= Sequalitchew Creek =

Coordinates: 47.0700°N 122.4000°W

- Sequalitchew Creek, lower canyon

- Location of the mouth of Sequalitchew Creek in Washington Sequalitchew Creek (the United States)

Physical characteristics
- Source
  - location: Sequalitchew Lake
- Mouth
  - location: DuPont Wharf, Nisqually Reach
- Length: 38.4 mi (61.8 km)
- Discharge
  - average: 812,500 US gallons per day (1.2571 cu ft/s; 0.03560 m^{3}/s)

Basin features
- Watershed: Chambers-Clover Watershed

Sequalitchew Creek, located in DuPont, Washington emanates from Sequalitchew Lake, Fort Lewis, Washington, was the location of the original Fort Nisqually trading post established in 1833 by the Hudson's Bay Company. The historic, natural flow of Sequalitchew Creek runs from Sequalitchew Lake, through Edmonds Marsh, down the canyon and out to the Puget Sound.

== History ==
Methodist Episcopal Mission marker at Sequalitchew Creek, N47 06 30.5, W122 38 57.7, WGS 84

Lands around the creek were territory of Coast Salish tribes, including the Steilacoom people, a Coast Salish tribe.

In 1832 the area that became Fort Nisqually was sited by Hudson's Bay Company's chief trader, Archibald McDonald. In cooperation with the Nisqually people, a storehouse for blankets, seeds, and potatoes was built at the mouth of Sequalitchew Creek.

- 1839: Nisqually Methodist Episcopal Mission was established, bringing the first U.S. citizens into the Puget Sound region near the creek canyon.
- 1841: Wilkes U.S. Exploring Expedition set up an observatory on the bluff near the creek to survey, map and chart the waters of Puget Sound. They joined the Americans at the mission to hold the first Fourth of July celebration west of the Mississippi River.
- 1843: Second Fort Nisqually. Business became mainly agricultural, and the fort was relocated on a flat-plains area near the banks of Sequalitchew Creek.
- 1904: First joint Army-National Guard training exercises on west coast were held. The massive encampment near Sequalitchew Creek included the “Buffalo Soldiers” of the 9th Cavalry.

In 1959 and 1960, Sequalitchew Lake was utilized by the Washington Department of Fisheries as a fish farm that reared and released coho salmon to Sequalitchew Creek. From 1976 until the mid-1990s the Washington Department of Fisheries operated a coho salmon fish hatchery and rearing facility on Sequalitchew Lake. In the past, Native Americans caught from 3,500 to 4,000 fish annually in Sequalitchew Creek.

== Course ==
Sequalitchew Creek Beach

The total drainage basin of the Creek encompasses 38.4 square miles (99 km^{2}). This watershed begins at Kinsey Marsh, draining via Murray Creek into American Lake. Seasonal overflow from American Lake feeds Sequalitchew Lake. The water level of both lakes is maintained year-round by springs and water table seepage. A diversion dam, built by Fort Lewis around 1950, lies near the headwaters of the Creek. The dam drains through a canal that originates in Hamer Marsh, east of the Creek. Just south of Sequalitchew Lake, the canal passes under the Creek through a series of complicated culverts. It continues west for one mile (1.6 km), and turns north to empty into Puget Sound at Tatsolo Point, off Steilacoom-DuPont Road, DuPont. The creek bed still carries water, in the form of ground water runoff, down the same historic creek path, finally emptying into the Puget Sound.

Sequalitchew Beach and railroad tracks

== Creek trail and beach ==
The area can be traversed on an old narrow gauge railway roadbed that ran from the DuPont Company area to Puget Sound. The trail leads to Sequalitchew beach. The creek corridor is used by hundreds of species, including eagles, hawks, song birds, herons, ducks, owls, frogs, salamanders, snakes, beaver, raccoons, coyotes, deer, and rabbits. The waters off Sequalitchew Beach are inhabited by harbor seal and gray whale.

== Proposed mining expansion ==
A proposed 177-acre (0.72 km^{2}) expansion of Glacier Northwest's (recently renamed as Cal-Portland, previously known as Lone Star Gravel) existing gravel mine will involve the removal of 184 acres (0.74 km^{2}) of forest and topsoil surrounding Sequalitchew Creek. If allowed, it will create a 550-acre (2.2 km^{2}) hole in the underlying gravel as 40 million tons of gravel is extracted over the next 14 years. The pit will be 80 feet (24 m) deep and expose the underlying Vashon Aquifer. The flow from this exposed aquifer (estimated at 6.5 million gallons per day) will be directed down a man made ditch to Sequalitchew Creek with a flow eight times that of present Sequalitchew Creek. The dewatering of the aquifer will lower the groundwater level in the vicinity by as much as 30 feet (9.1 m), thereby draining nearby Edmonds Marsh, a Class I wetland. Nearby Pond Lake, McKay Marsh, Bell Marsh and Hammer Marsh will be adversely affected.

=== DuPont staff recommendation ===
On January 16, 2009, Bill Kingman, DuPont Planning Department signed on behalf of the City of DuPont to accept the proposed mining expansion as follows, (directly quoting):

Approval of expansion of the aggregate mine into the area proposed is recommended, but with conditions that change some of the characteristics of the proposal.

This approval would include:

1. Expansion of aggregate removal throughout the 177 acres (0.72 km^{2}) proposed would be allowed.
2. Groundwater aquifer dewatering to lower the water table for access to additional aggregate would be allowed. This initially would be accomplished through interceptor wells. In the long term, construction of a portion of the proposed new North Sequalitchew Creek channel would permanently intercept groundwater and discharge to the existing Sequalitchew Creek.
3. Mitigation for potential groundwater aquifer drawdown impacts on Edmond Marsh would be accomplished by replacing invasive vegetation by native vegetation that will result in equal or greater wetland function and values.
4. Removal of the “Kettle Wetland” would be allowed with mitigation consisting of creation of replacement wetlands that may be located adjacent to the proposed new North Sequalitchew Creek channel.
5. Displacement of wetland functions at the Seep and Riparian Forest wetlands adjacent to Sequalitchew Creek due to interception of groundwater from the excavation for aggregate removal would be approved with mitigation consisting of replacement wetlands.
6. The conditions of approval would not allow the excavation of the north side of the existing Sequalitchew Creek ravine but would, instead, require installation of a bored pipeline approximately 500 feet (150 m) long.

Glacier Northwest's current Conditional Use Permit to expand the mine, and dewater the aquifer and creek violates the 1994 Settlement Agreement as established by the Nisqually Delta Association. DuPont Municipal Code specifically protects wetlands. Although a signatory, the city of DuPont ignored the '94 agreement and their own municipal code and did not discourage Glacier from applying to expand their mining extraction. In accordance with the '94 Agreement, parties are now meeting regularly to determine next steps.

=== Sequalitchew Village ===
City of DuPont's 2008 Draft Comprehensive Land Use Plan, p. 47 describes future use of the mining area, Sequalitchew Creek and dewatering of the aquifer to include total build out of approximately 2,138 residences. The proposed neighborhood would be named Sequalitchew Village.

=== Memorandum of understanding ===
A memorandum of understanding has been crafted regarding the supplemental review process for Glacier NW's mining expansion at Sequalitchew Creek. The document was introduced to the council at their October 13, 2009 meeting, to be signed and approved. Several council members expressed concern about lack of public review. Public review and comment is currently being solicited, after which the document will then be again considered at the November 10, 2009 meeting.

== Fauna ==
In a 1982 Weyerhaueser environmental impact statement, the following vertebrate species were found in the creek:

=== Fish ===
- Steelhead
- Chinook salmon
- Coho salmon
- Chum salmon
- Pink salmon
- Coastal cutthroat trout
- Black bullhead

=== Birds ===
- Common loon
- Red-throated loon
- Red-necked grebe
- Horned grebe
- Pied-billed grebe
- Double-crested cormorant
- Green heron
- Mallard
- Gadwall
- Pintail
- Green-winged teal
- Blue-winged teal
- American wigeon
- Northern shoveler
- Wood duck
- Ring-necked duck
- Canvasback
- Greater scaup
- Lesser scaup
- Common goldeneye
- Bufflehead
- White-winged scoter
- Surf scoter
- Black scoter
- Ruddy duck
- Red-breasted merganser
- Turkey vulture
- Sharp-shinned hawk
- Cooper's hawk
- Red-tailed hawk
- Bald eagle
- Osprey
- American kestrel
- Blue grouse
- Ruffed grouse
- California quail
- Ring-necked pheasant
- Virginia rail
- American coot
- Killdeer
- Common snipe
- Spotted sandpiper
- Greater yellowlegs
- Least sandpiper
- Western sandpiper
- Parasitic jaeger
- Glaucous-winged gull
- Herring gull
- California gull
- Ring-billed gull
- Mew gull
- Bonaparte's gull
- Common tern
- Common murre
- Pigeon guillemot
- Marbled murrelet
- Cassin's auklet
- Rhinoceros auklet
- Band-tailed pigeon
- Rock dove
- Mourning dove
- Barn owl
- Great horned owl
- Short-eared owl
- Rufous hummingbird
- Belted kingfisher
- Northern flicker
- Pileated woodpecker
- Yellow-bellied sapsucker
- Hairy woodpecker
- Downy woodpecker
- Willow flycatcher
- Pacific-slope flycatcher
- Western wood pewee
- Olive-sided flycatcher
- Violet-green swallow
- Tree swallow
- Northern rough-winged swallow
- Barn swallow
- Cliff swallow
- Purple martin
- Canada jay
- Steller's jay
- Crow
- Northwestern crow
- Black-capped chickadee
- Chestnut-backed chickadee
- Bushtit
- Red-breasted nuthatch
- Brown creeper
- Dipper
- House wren
- Winter wren
- Bewick's wren
- Long-billed marsh wren
- American robin
- Varied thrush
- Hermit thrush
- Swainson's thrush
- Townsend's solitaire
- Golden-crowned kinglet
- Ruby-crowned kinglet
- Water pipit
- Cedar waxwing
- Northern shrike
- Starling
- Solitary vireo
- Warbling vireo
- Yellow warbler
- Yellow-rumped warbler
- MacGillivray's warbler
- Common yellowthroat
- Wilson's warbler
- Western meadowlark
- Yellow-headed blackbird
- Brewer's blackbird
- Red-winged blackbird
- Brown-headed cowbird
- Western tanager
- Black-headed grosbeak
- Purple finch
- House finch
- Pine siskin
- American goldfinch
- Red crossbill
- Spotted towhee
- Savannah sparrow
- Vesper sparrow
- Dark-eyed junco
- White-crowned sparrow
- Fox sparrow
- Song sparrow

=== Mammals ===
- Masked shrew
- Trowbridge's shrew
- Vagrant shrew
- Dusky shrew
- Pacific water shrew
- Shrew-mole
- Townsend's mole
- Pacific mole
- Bat
- Raccoon
- Long-tailed weasel
- Striped skunk
- Coyote
- Northern shrike harbor seal
- Townsend's chipmunk
- Western gray squirrel
- Beaver
- Deer mouse
- Townsend's vole
- Oregon vole
- Muskrat
- House mouse
- Pacific jumping mouse
- Porcupine
- Snowshoe hare
- Eastern cottontail
- Black-tailed deer
- Gray whale

=== Reptiles and amphibians ===
- Brown cave salamander
- Northern rough-skinned newt
- Western redback salamander
- Oregon slender salamander
- Boreal toad
- Pacific tree frog
- Northern red-legged frog
- Bullfrog
- Northwestern fence lizard
- Northern alligator lizard
- Pacific rubber boa
- Puget Sound red-sided garter snake
- Wandering garter snake
