= Steilacoom Historical School District =

School district in Steilacoom, Washington

Address
- 511 Chambers Street Steilacoom, Washington, 98388; United States

District information
- Type: Public
- Grades: Pre-K through 12th
- Established: 1854
- Superintendent: Kathi Weight
- NCES District ID: 5308460

Students and staff
- Students: 3,248
- Student–teacher ratio: 19.94:1

Other information
- Website: www.steilacoom.k12.wa.us

Steilacoom Historical School District No. 1 is a public school district in Steilacoom, Washington, United States. It serves the city of Steilacoom, the communities of DuPont and Anderson Island, and portions of Lakewood and unincorporated Pierce County.

The SHSD is the oldest school district in Pierce County, being founded in 1854 in the Washington Territory. In 1975 the Steilacoom School District Board approved consolidation with the Anderson Island School District and the DuPont-Fort Lewis School District and was renamed Steilacoom Historical School District No. 1. The district did not have a high school until the establishment of Steilacoom High School in 1984. Until then, high school students had to graduate from schools in the nearby Tacoma School District and Clover Park School District.

In the 2015–2016 school year, the district had an enrollment of 3,248 students.

== History ==
Communities in the district include: Steilacoom, Anderson Island, DuPont, Ketron Island, and portions of Lakewood and University Place.

== Schools ==
The district operates five elementary schools, one middle school, and one high school.

=== Elementary schools ===
- Anderson Island Elementary School
- Cherrydale Primary School
- Chloe Clark Primary School
- Saltar's Point Elementary School
- PreSchool and ECEAP (Pre-K)

=== Middle school ===
- Pioneer Middle School

=== High school ===
- Steilacoom High School

=== Virtual school ===
From 2005 to 2012 the school district had a partnership with the Washington Virtual Academy (WAVA), a K-8 virtual school operated by a private organization and hosted by the SSD. Students attended online classes provided by the WVA and supported by the school district through home schooling. Enrollment was not restricted to those within the school district and students from across the state attended. The partnership between WAVA and SSD began in 2006 with 652 students registered. The partnership was ended at the end of the 2011–12 school year following a dispute between the private contractor and the school district. Approximately 25 students in the district were enrolled.

In the model offered through WAVA, students receive direct instruction from designated adults, such as their parents, with assistance of materials provided by WAVA. These materials include a teacher's guide, curriculum materials, books, workbooks, and materials for assignments. Student evaluations are conducted by the instructing adult. Approximately one-quarter of the work is online. Students are able to work at different grade levels in different subjects and advance when they reach certain levels of proficiency. Certified teachers who monitor progress, talk regularly with students and parents, and answer questions were assigned to each family. Online instruction and field trips for groups of students are arranged. Students must take standard state and school district exams.

== Governance ==
The district is governed by a board of directors elected from the district at large. Each of the five directors is elected for a term of four years.

The school board president is Samuel T. Scott and the superintendent is Kathi Weight.
