= 2018 Horizon Air Bombardier Q400 incident =

Aircraft crash in United States

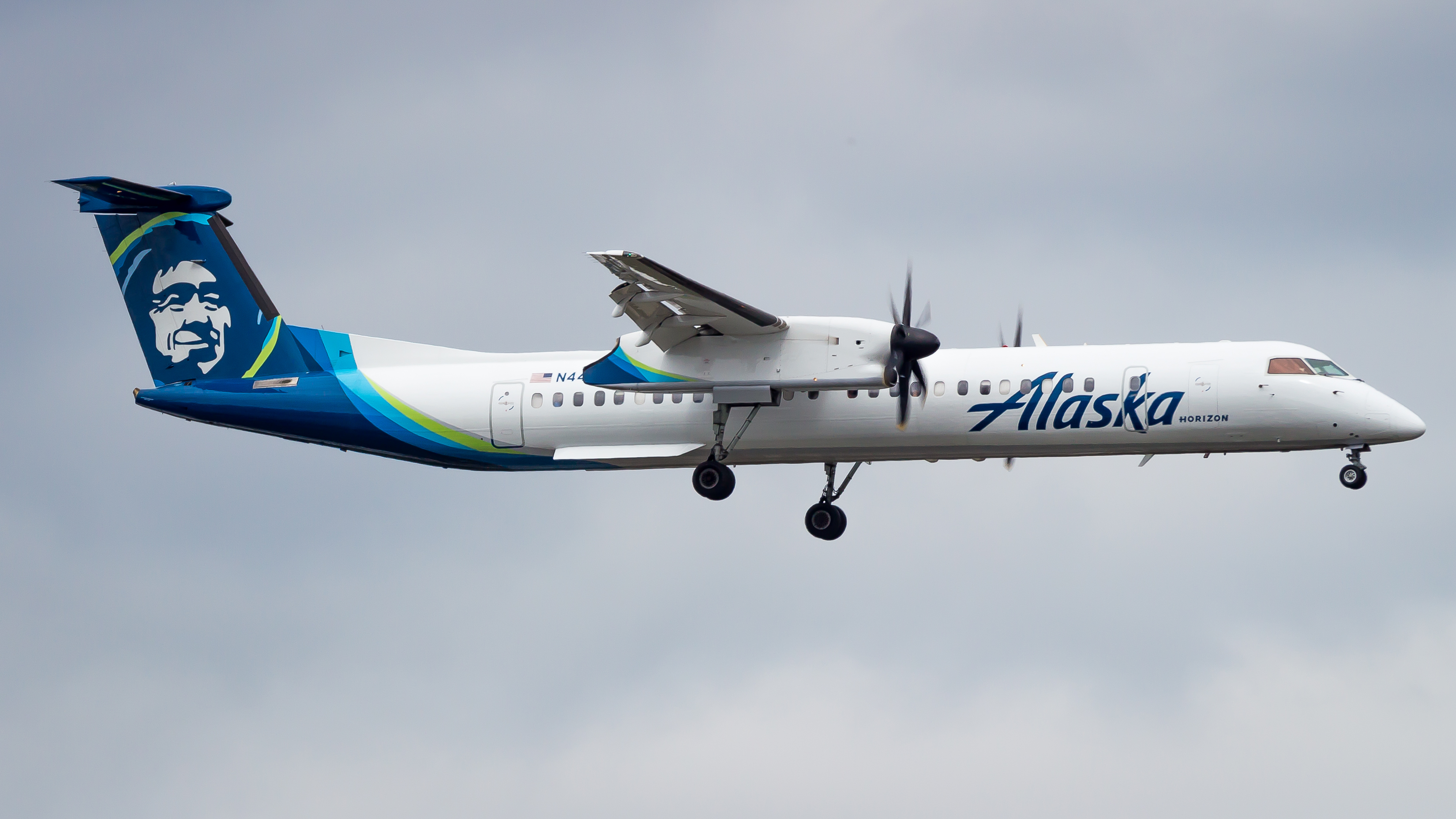
- N449QX, the aircraft involved in the incident, in June 2018

Incident
- Date: August 10, 2018
- Summary: Unauthorized aircraft takeoff and suicide
- Site: Ketron Island, Washington, United States; 47.1497661°N 122.6380510°W

Aircraft
- Aircraft type: Bombardier Q400
- Operator: Horizon Air operating for Alaska Airlines
- Registration: N449QX
- Flight origin: Seattle–Tacoma International Airport
- Occupants: 1
- Fatalities: 1
- Survivors: 0

On August 10, 2018, a Bombardier Q400 operated by Horizon Air was stolen from Seattle–Tacoma International Airport (Sea–Tac) by 28-year-old Richard Russell, a Horizon Air ground service agent with no piloting experience. After Russell performed an unauthorized takeoff, two McDonnell Douglas F-15 Eagle fighters were scrambled to intercept the aircraft. Sea–Tac air traffic control made radio contact with Russell, the sole occupant, who described himself as a "broken guy ... got a few screws loose, I guess." About 1 hour and 15 minutes after takeoff, Russell successfully executed a loop before purposely crashing the aircraft on the sparsely populated Ketron Island in Puget Sound with the intent to die by suicide. There were no collateral human injuries; Russell was the sole fatality.

== Aircraft ==
The aircraft was a De Havilland Dash 8-400, owned by Horizon Air (and operating for Alaska Airlines) MSN 4410, registered as N449QX, and built by Bombardier Aviation in 2012. It was equipped with two Pratt & Whitney PW150A engines. It landed at Seattle–Tacoma International Airport at 13:35 local time the afternoon of the incident, after an in-service flight from Victoria, British Columbia. It was not scheduled to fly again that day.

== Incident ==
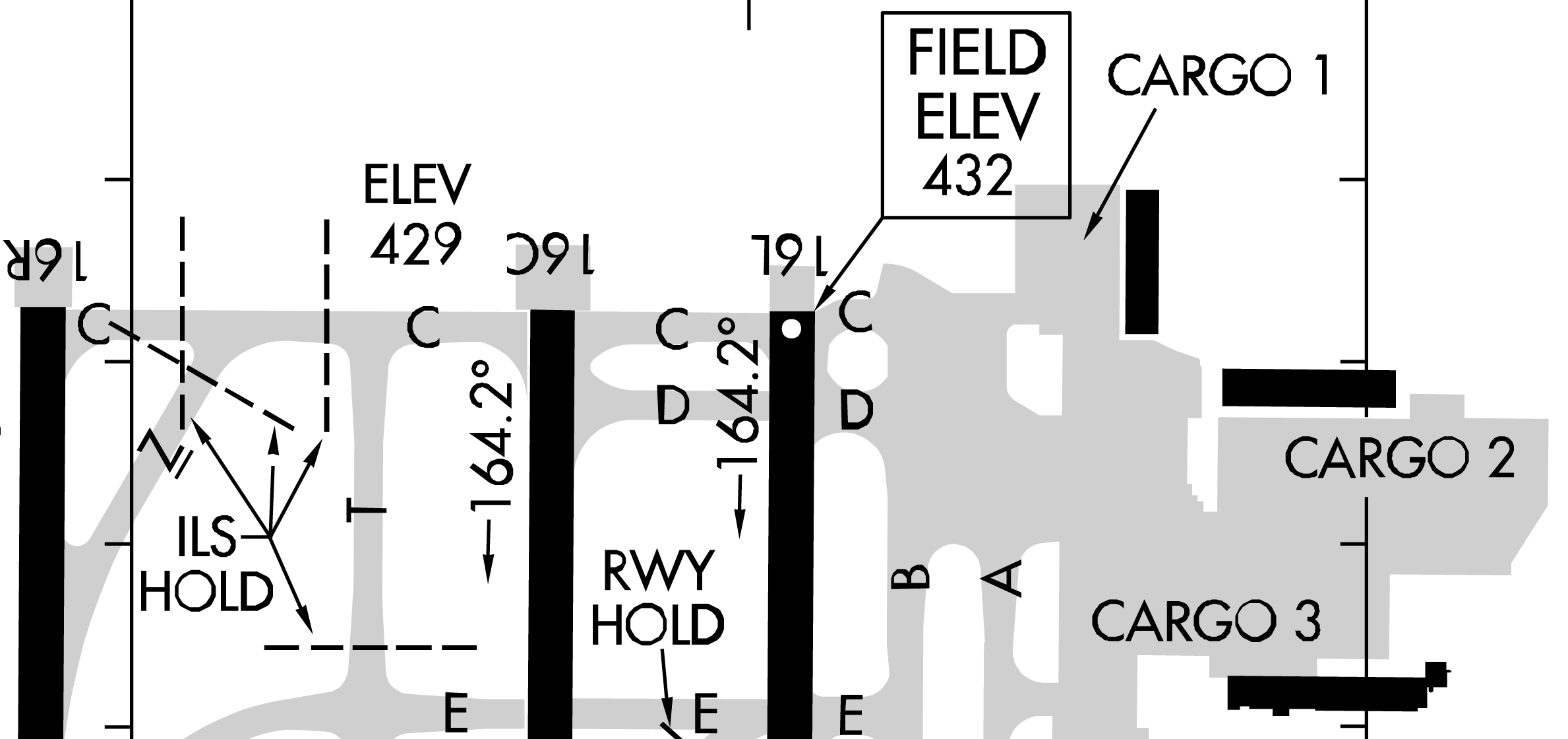
Chart of the far northern end of Seattle–Tacoma International, showing the location of Cargo 1 and runway 16C

Location of Seattle–Tacoma International Airport (north) and Ketron Island (south) within northwestern Washington state.

Conversation between Russell and ATC

The aircraft was stolen from Plane Cargo 1 at the north end of Sea–Tac Airport and maneuvered to runway 16C via taxi. Seattle Tower tried several times to get the pilot of the aircraft to identify himself but received no response. A nearby Alaska Airlines jet on the ground reported that the aircraft began a takeoff roll with its wheels smoking, and an unauthorized takeoff was made at 19:32 local time (02:32 UTC, August 11). In response, two McDonnell Douglas F-15C Eagles of the Oregon Air National Guard's 142nd Fighter Wing under the command of NORAD were scrambled at around 20:15 local time from Portland Air National Guard Base to intercept it. Both were armed with AIM-9 Sidewinder and AIM-120 AMRAAM air-to-air missiles and reached supersonic speeds, which generated sonic booms on the way to the Puget Sound area. A KC-135R Stratotanker refueling tanker was also scrambled from Fairchild Air Force Base to support the F-15 flight. Flights in and out of Sea–Tac Airport were temporarily suspended.

Seattle–Tacoma air traffic control (ATC) maintained radio contact with the occupant. The transmissions were quickly recorded and posted on social media websites. The pilot said he was a "broken guy ... got a few screws loose, I guess. Never really knew it until now." When ATC suggested he land the plane at Joint Base Lewis–McChord, the occupant refused: "Those guys will rough me up if I try and land there. I think I might mess something up there, too. I wouldn't want to do that." He asked ATC if he could get a job as a pilot with Alaska Airlines if he successfully landed the aircraft. ATC said, "they would give you a job doing anything if you could pull this off", to which he replied, "Yeah right! Nah, I'm a white guy." He spoke of wanting to do "a couple maneuvers, to see what it can do", and requested the coordinates of an orca that had been brought to national attention, saying, "I want to go see that guy." He stated that he did not want to hurt anyone, and in the final minutes of the communication apologized to his friends and family. Near the end of the flight, the aircraft performed a barrel roll over Puget Sound, recovering approximately ten feet (3 m) above the water. A veteran pilot said the maneuver "seemed pretty well executed, without either stalling or pulling the wings off." When an air traffic controller requested he land the plane after this maneuver, he said: "I don't know. I don't want to. I was kind of hoping that was gonna be it, you know?" He added that he "wasn't really planning on landing it."

The two F-15s attempted to direct the aircraft toward the Pacific Ocean and did not fire at it. The Q400 ultimately crashed at 20:43 local time on Ketron Island in Puget Sound, Pierce County, Washington, killing Russell and destroying the aircraft. A tow boat crew was the first to respond. Delayed by the need to wait to catch the Steilacoom–Anderson Island ferry, firefighters from West Pierce Fire and Rescue and other nearby departments arrived on the island about an hour and a half after the crash, where they then contended with the island's thick brush. The fire burned a two-acre (0.8 ha) area, but it was extinguished by the following morning. No injuries were reported to residents of the sparsely populated island even though the crash site was close to at least one cabin, which was occupied at the time of the incident.

== Investigation ==
The Pierce County Sheriff's Office thanked the public for its accurate information and acknowledged on August 11 that federal agencies would lead the investigation, primarily the Seattle office of the Federal Bureau of Investigation (FBI). It described the perpetrator, identified as 28-year-old Richard Russell, as suicidal and said his actions did not constitute a "terrorist incident". Alaska Air Group CEO Brad Tilden announced on the same day that the airline was coordinating with the Federal Aviation Administration, the FBI, and the National Transportation Safety Board, and was "working to find out everything we possibly can about what happened". On August 12, the FBI said that it had recovered the flight data recorder along with components of the cockpit voice recorder. The equipment was sent to the National Transportation Safety Board for processing.

On November 9, the FBI stated that it had completed its investigation. Terrorism was ruled out, and Russell was found to have acted alone. The final descent at Ketron Island was determined to be intentional, and suicide was listed as the manner of death. The FBI stated, "Interviews with work colleagues, friends, and family—and review of text messages exchanged with Russell during the incident—identified no information suggesting the theft of the aircraft was related to wider criminal activity or terrorist ideology. Although investigators received information regarding Russell's background, possible stressors, and personal life, no element provided a clear motivation for Russell's actions."

== Richard Russell ==
Richard Russell
- Undated photo of Russell
- Born: September 19, 1989; Key West, Florida, US
- Died: August 10, 2018 (aged 28); Ketron Island, Washington, U.S.
- Other names: "Beebo" "Sky King" (posthumously)
- Occupation: Ground service agent

Richard Russell was a Horizon Air ground service agent from Sumner, Washington. He had been part of a tow team, which repositions aircraft on the airport apron, for about four years. An operational supervisor for Horizon Air described Russell as "a quiet guy" who was "well liked by the other workers". During his communication with air traffic control, Russell made a complaint about wages, stating: "Minimum wage, we'll chalk it up to that. Maybe that will grease some gears a little bit with the higher-ups."

Russell was born in Key West, Florida, and moved to Wasilla, Alaska, at the age of seven. From early childhood he was known as "Beebo" to his friends and family. He attended Wasilla High School, where he wrestled and competed in track and field. He was a hard-hitting football fullback in high school, scoring six touchdowns in his senior year, after which he moved to North Dakota to join the football team at Valley City State University. He left for Southwestern Oregon Community College, where he met his wife at a Campus Crusade for Christ meeting. They married in 2012. Together, they started a bakery in North Bend, Oregon. They sold the bakery in 2015 so his wife could be closer to her family; they settled in Sumner, Washington, and Russell found employment with Horizon Air. He was an avid traveler and attended Washington State University Global Campus, majoring in social science. He had planned to seek a management position at Horizon Air or become a military officer after receiving his degree. He was active in his church and a leader in the local Christian youth ministry Young Life.

Horizon Air CEO Gary Beck stated that, as far as the company knew, Russell did not have a pilot's license. Beck said the aerial maneuvers were "incredible" and that he "did not know how [Russell] achieved the experience that he did." During his conversation with air traffic control, Russell said he "[knew] what [he was] doing a little bit" because he had experience playing video games. After the incident, Joel Monteith, a pilot for SkyWest Airlines, relayed to an emergency dispatcher that in 2017, he saw Russell and another man "pointing and flipping switches" in the cockpit of a SkyWest aircraft parked at Sea–Tac Airport. Monteith stated the men told him they were training to use the aircraft's auxiliary power unit so they could tow it, but said it was "suspicious" that they left when he confronted them. Monteith also recalled that Russell had been in the cockpit of an Embraer 175 with him, and that Russell asked him about his "flows, which is the preflight preparation I do for takeoff." Some co-workers said that Russell had probably trained himself to fly using amateur flight simulation software.

Russell's family released a statement on August 11, stating they were "stunned and heartbroken" and "devastated by the events".

== Aftermath ==
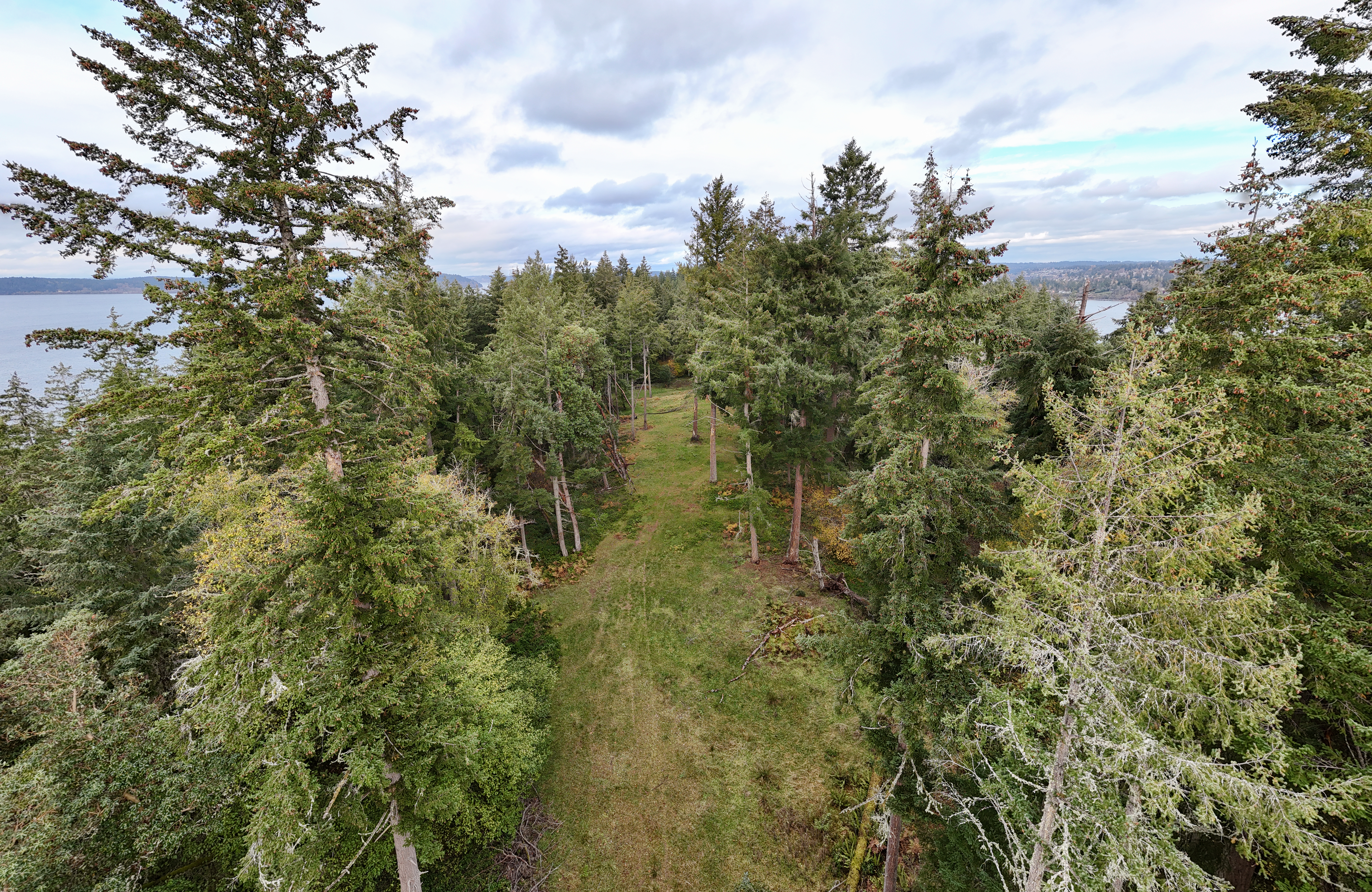
Ketron Island crash site in 2024

In the days after the crash, cleanup and recovery crews contracted by Alaska Airlines and its insurers removed debris from the island. As of 2019, this cleanup effort was still ongoing, with pieces of aircraft wreckage still being located on the island after the first anniversary of the incident. Residents of the island bore some cleanup costs, and negotiations were initiated for their reimbursement by Alaska Airlines' insurers. The aircraft was worth $30 million, which was paid under the company's insurance policy "with no deductibles."

Videos and radio transmissions of the event were followed online, immediately sparking a meme, with people dubbing Russell "Sky King". People expressed an emotional connection with him as seen through postings on social media, T-shirts, and tribute songs. According to Rolling Stone magazine, he has become a folk hero in the following years.

On April 14, 2022, the FBI released over 500 pages of documents related to the investigation.

== In popular culture ==
A film was later made about this incident that was released on April 14, 2026, titled #Skyking. The film was created in dedication to Richard Russell.

== See also ==
- 2003 Angola Boeing 727 disappearance – another instance of aircraft theft
- 1999 Air Botswana ATR 42 crash – an instance of an employee stealing an aircraft and crashing it
