= Clara Antoinette McCarty Wilt =

Clara Antoinette McCarty Wilt (1858–1929) was the first graduate of the University of Washington and the first woman superintendent of the Pierce County School District.

== Early life ==
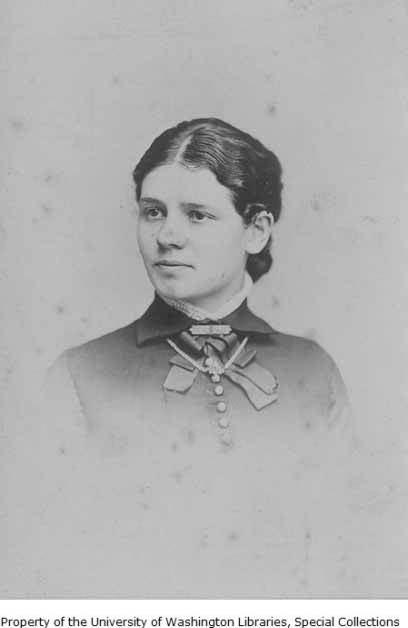
Clara McCarty Wilt, 1882

McCarty was born on February 12, 1858, in Steilacoom, Washington. She was born to Jonathan Warren and Ruth Jane Kincaid McCarty. Jonathan and Ruth were two of the original settlers of the town of Sumner, Washington. They were married on January 7, 1855, in the Sumner area. Clara was the second of five children: Charles C., Laura Candace, Mary Estelle, William W., and Frank Truman. In the years following their marriage, Jonathan and Ruth, along with Ruth's family moved to Fort Steilacoom when Sumner was threatened by Native Americans. While in Fort Steilacoom, Ruth had Clara in 1858.

In 1859, Clara's family went back to their settlement to find it completely destroyed by Native Americans. They started a new farm, and Clara's father worked as mailman servicing Seattle and other places around the area, as well as keeping up the farm. In 1869, when Clara reached her preteens, she and her family moved to Seattle so that she and her siblings could receive a better education. There, Clara's father worked in the meat business, continued his work as a mailman, and hauled coal from Lake Union to the bay.

=== Family ===
Clara married John Henry Wilt (1852–1907) on July 13, 1882. Together, they had one child, Clara May Wilt.

== Accomplishments ==
Clara was a woman of many firsts. She is even recognized for purchasing the first typewriter in Pierce County.

=== University of Washington Graduate ===
In 1876, Clara Antoinette McCarty Wilt graduated from the Territorial University, now known as the University of Washington, at the age of 18. She was the first person to successfully graduate from the university, let alone the first woman to graduate. She graduated with a bachelor's degree in science. At the time, the Territorial University was located in what is now downtown Seattle, wedged between 4th and 6th Avenues on the west and east and Union and Seneca Streets on the north and south. In 1861, the first university building had four floors, and thirty-five rooms. Tuition was twenty two dollars a quarter when Clara attended the university. After graduating from the university, Clara taught in various schools, and then she attended the University of California. In her honor, McCarty Hall, a dormitory on the current UW campus is named after her.

=== Superintendent of Pierce County Schools ===
On November 2, 1880, Clara was elected Superintendent of Pierce County Schools. With this achievement, she was the first Superintendent of Pierce County Schools, as well as being the first woman to hold office in the Washington Territory.

== Later life and death ==
In her later years, Clara was very involved in her community, including working as a YMCA secretary, typing for the County Court, and acting as secretary in her church. She was also involved in her local historical society. She died on January 19, 1929, at 71 years of age.
