= Steilacoom–Anderson Island ferry =

Ferry route in the U.S. state of Washington

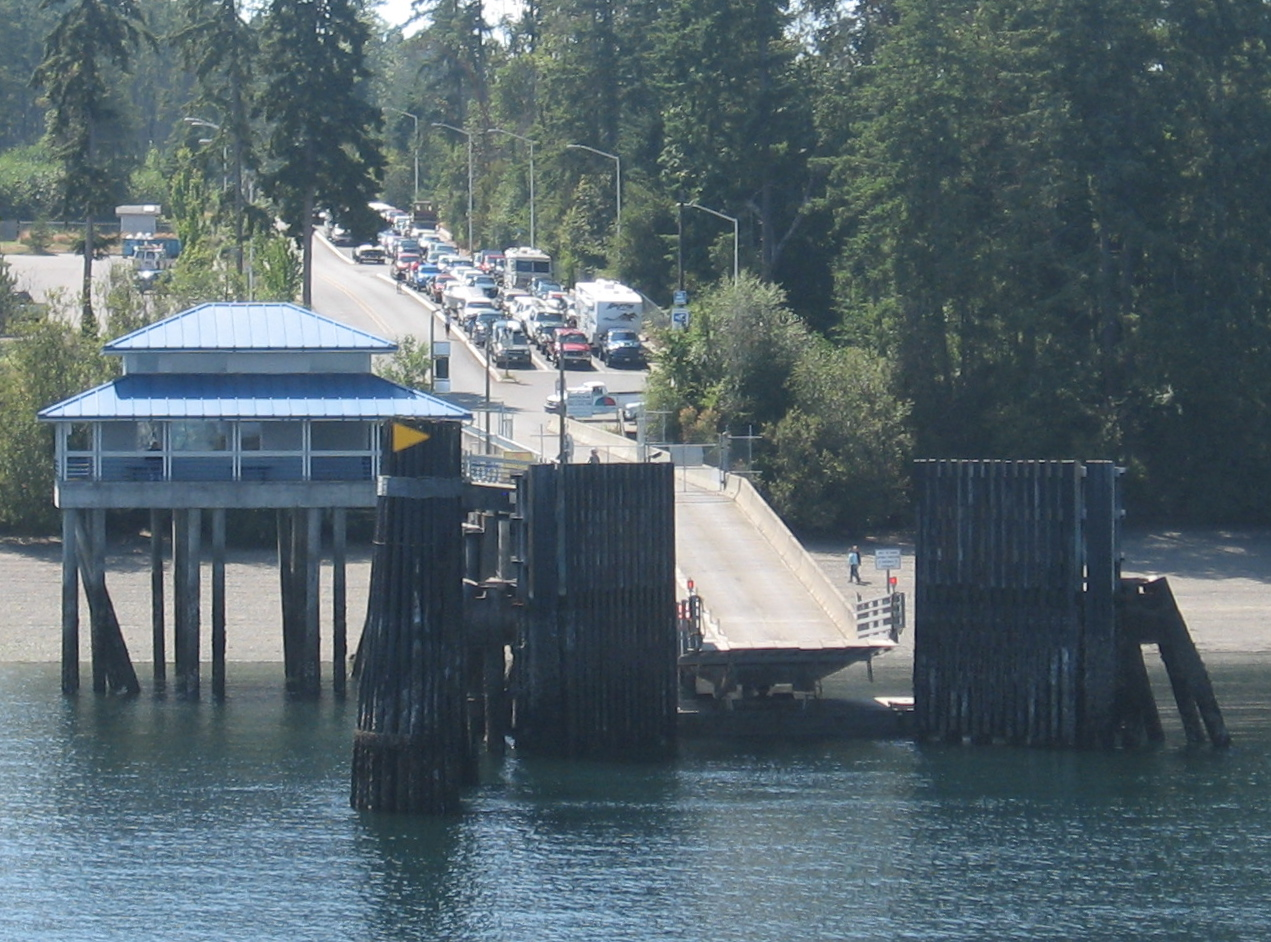
- Anderson Island ferry terminal
- Waterway: Puget Sound
- Route: Steilacoom–Anderson Island–Ketron Island
- Authority: Pierce County Ferry
- Began operation: 1922
- Yearly ridership: 94,717 (2010)
- Yearly vehicles: 99,139 (2010)

The Steilacoom–Anderson Island ferry is a ferry route in southern Puget Sound which is owned and operated by Pierce County, Washington. The route also serves Ketron Island.

== History ==
The first ferry service to Anderson Island was on April 1, 1922, with the ferry Elk (later renamed Airline), running under a contract between Pierce County, Washington and the Skansie Brothers. Elk was new at the time, 67 ft (20.42 m), and could transport 16 automobiles. The Skansie brothers were successful at securing other ferry contracts, and they built most of their ferries, including Elk in their own shipyard. Traffic increased and by 1924, the Skansies were able to put another ferry on the route, the City of Steilacoom, with a capacity for 30 automobiles. The City of Steilacoom had a single deck with a small elevated control room, and a ramp, and looked like a powered barge.

In 1934–35, the ferry service was still being conducted by the Skansie brothers, who were doing business as the Washington Navigation Company, under Mitchell Skansie, president. The ferry continued to depart from Steilacoom, and made stops at Anderson Island, Longbranch, Washington and McNeil Island, with no stop listed for Ketron Island. Four runs per day were made in 1934–35, with additional trips if traffic demanded.

In 1938 Pierce County assumed control of the ferry service over and contracted it out for operation. In 1939, Pierce County bought the ferry Pioneer, which had been built in 1916, to serve as reserve boat. Pioneer had been employed on the Deception Pass ferry until 1935, when that route was eliminated by the construction of the Deception Pass Bridge. Pioneer was sold in 1964.

In 1967 Pierce County bought the wooden-hulled motor ferry Tourist II (98 ft (29.87 m), 95 tons, capacity: 22 automobiles), which had been running on the Astoria–Megler route from 1924 to 1966, and renamed the vessel Islander. Although over 40 years old, Islander had been well maintained and was in excellent condition.

In 1995 the M/V Christine Anderson was placed on the route.

== Current status ==
In 2010 the ferry on the route M/V Christine Anderson was renovated at a cost of $1.5 million, 80% of which was paid for by the Federal Transit Administration. The work took 8 weeks in dry dock. In addition, $71,000 worth of repairs were done to the Steilacoom, Anderson Island, and Ketron Island ferry docks. 62% of this cost was paid for with Federal stimulus funds.

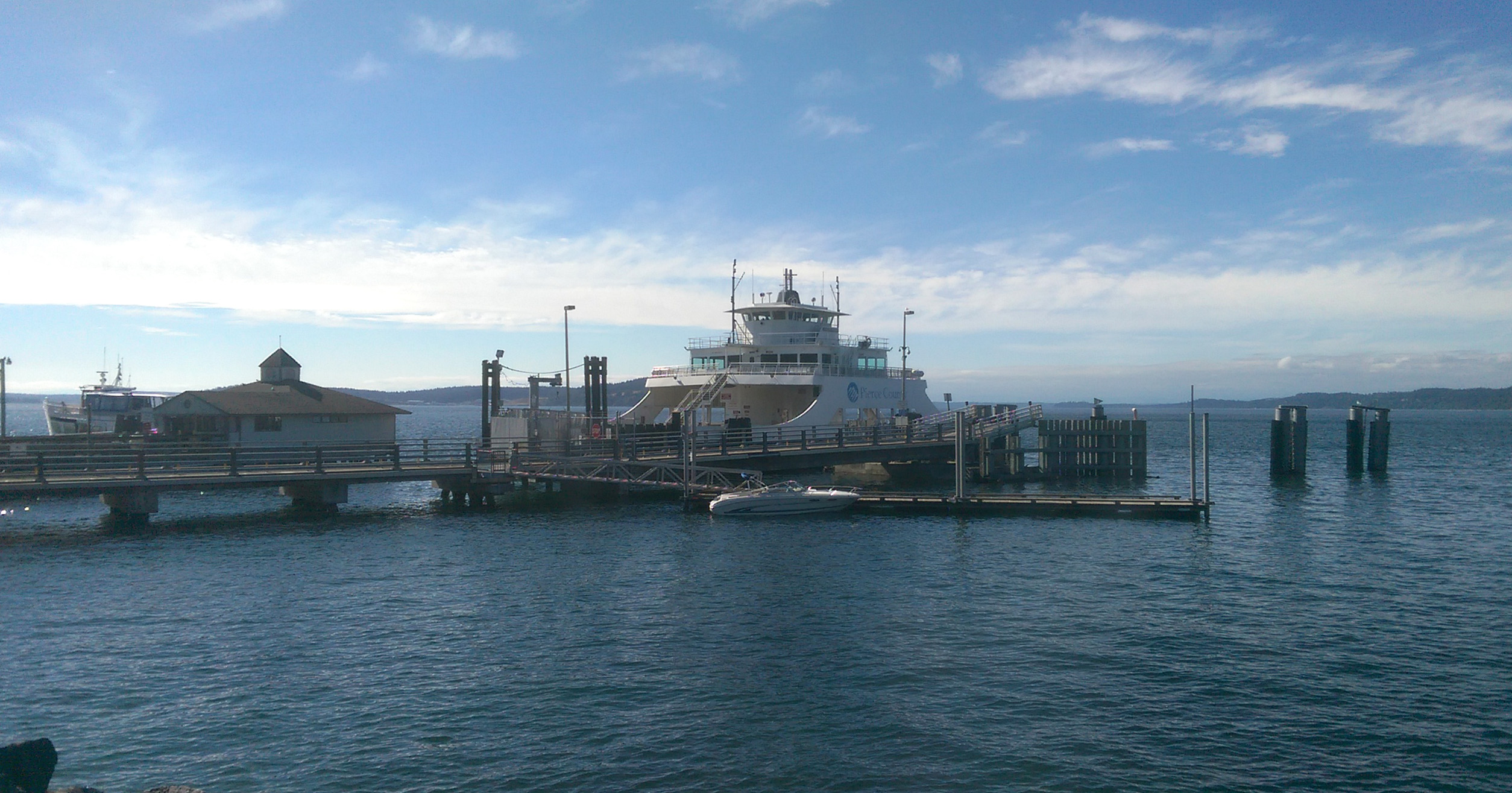
Ferry at the Steilacoom dock

There are 10 to 14 runs from Steilacom to Anderson Island per day, depending on the day of the week. Four runs per day detour to Ketron either from (mornings) Steilacoom Dock or back from Anderson Island (evenings).
