= DuPont, Washington =

- City
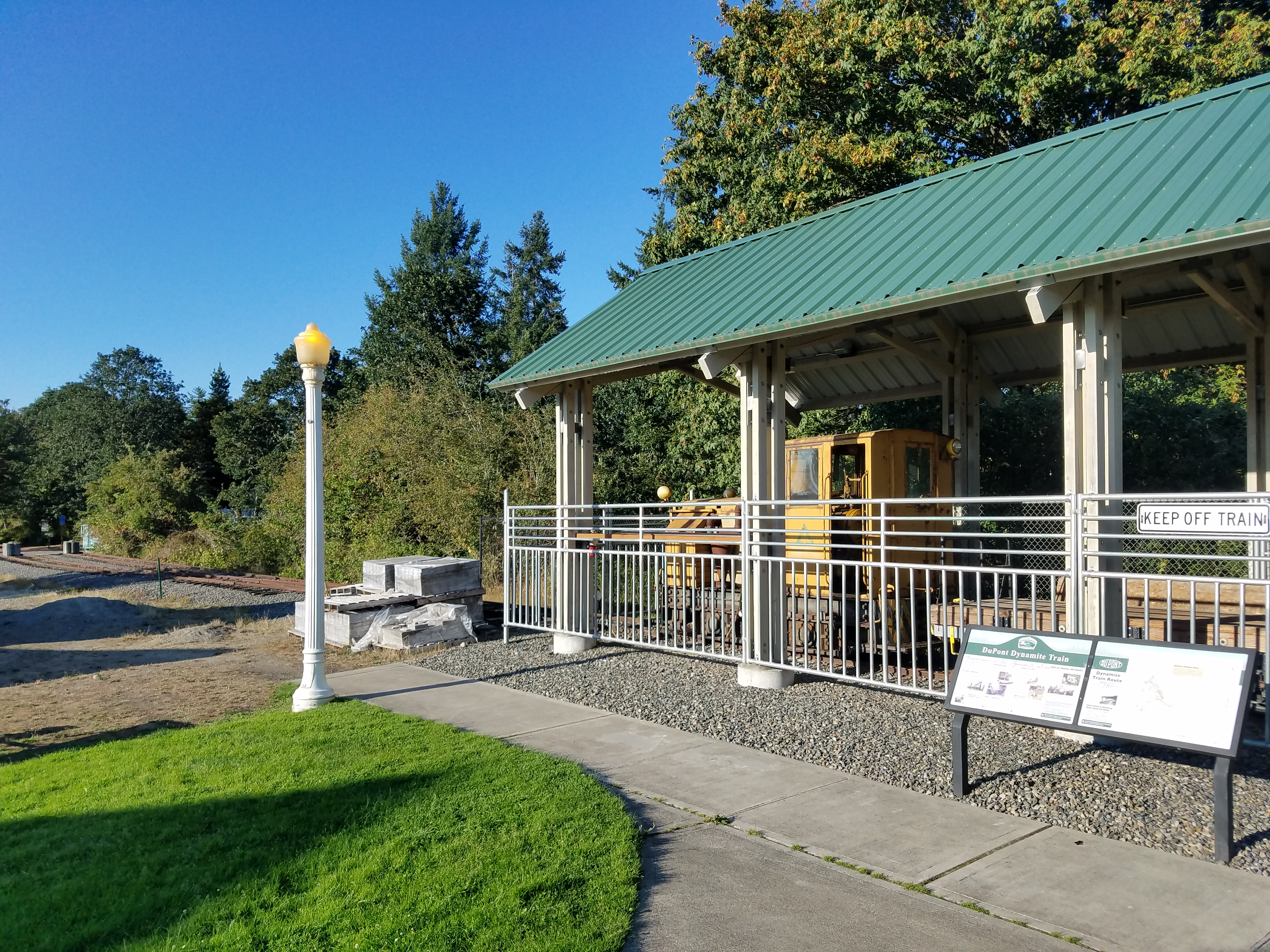
- DuPont dynamite train exhibit in DuPont Village

- Flag Logo

- Location of DuPont, Washington
- Coordinates: 47°6′1″N 122°38′41″W
- Country: United States
- State: Washington
- County: Pierce
- Incorporated: April 15, 1951

Government
  - Type: Mayor–Council
  - Mayor: Ronald Frederick
  - Deputy Mayor: Mike Winkler

Area
  - Total: 5.85 sq mi (15.15 km^{2})
  - Land: 5.82 sq mi (15.07 km^{2})
  - Water: 0.031 sq mi (0.08 km^{2})
- Elevation: 207 ft (63 m)

Population (2020)
  - Total: 10,151
  - Estimate (2021): 10,112
  - Density: 1,635.3/sq mi (631.41/km^{2})
- Time zone: UTC-8 (PST)
  - Summer (DST): UTC-7 (PDT)
- ZIP code: 98327
- Area code: 253
- FIPS code: 53-18965
- Website: dupontwa.gov

DuPont is a city in Pierce County, Washington, United States. The population was 10,151 at the 2020 census. Originally a company town, the city is named after the DuPont chemical company which operated an explosives manufacturing plant in the area from 1909 to 1975.

== History ==
There was a Native American presence in the area for the last 10,000 years. At the time of contact the Nisqually Tribe lived in relative peace and prosperity in their aboriginal homeland of about two million acres (810,000 ha) near the present-day towns of Olympia, Tenino, and DuPont, and extending to Mount Rainier. Tribal life changed radically with the advent of Euro-American settlement about 150 years ago. Forced to compromise its interests and rights over the years, the Tribe always sought to maintain its integrity and dignity. Subsisting on shellfish from the beaches and salmon from Sequalitchew Creek. Captain George Vancouver mapped the area in 1792, and in 1833, the Hudson's Bay Company established a fur trading post at Fort Nisqually as a halfway point between Ft. Vancouver and Ft. Langley. The fort was relocated upstream in 1843. It was relocated to expand on the fort to house more workers and to have better access to fresh water. Charles Wilkes of the United States Exploring Expedition held the first American Independence Day celebration west of the Mississippi River in the present-day DuPont area on July 5, 1841.

The first school in the area was the Nisqually Methodist Mission school, which operated from 1840 through 1842. Chloe A. Clark was appointed teacher at the school. The first public school was established in 1852. By 1869, the Hudson Bay Company had to sell the land to the U.S. government for $650,000. The Oregon Treaty of 1846 gave the land of the Oregon Territory to the U.S. but still allowed the HBC to continue operating in the area. American farmers in the area resented this decision and pushed out the company by establishing their own market place and squatting on company land. By 1865, there were about 150 illegal squatters on company property who would harass the livestock of the Hudson's Bay Company. A few of the farmers urged Congress to remove the fort as well as the Puget Sound Agricultural Company from the Pacific Northwest. These conditions made it hard to continue operations in the region so the fort was closed.

The land was up for grabs once Hudson's Bay Company left and many farmers bought the land. In 1906, the DuPont chemical company purchased a 5-square-mile (13 km^{2}) area from the farmers for construction of an explosives plant, as the company was in the midst of expanding into the west. The plant was built on the initial 1833 Ft. Nisqually site and was completed in 1909. During its nearly 70-year history, the plant produced dynamite for the U.S. military as well as for the construction of various civilian projects including the Grand Coulee Dam, the Alcan Highway, and the Panama Canal.

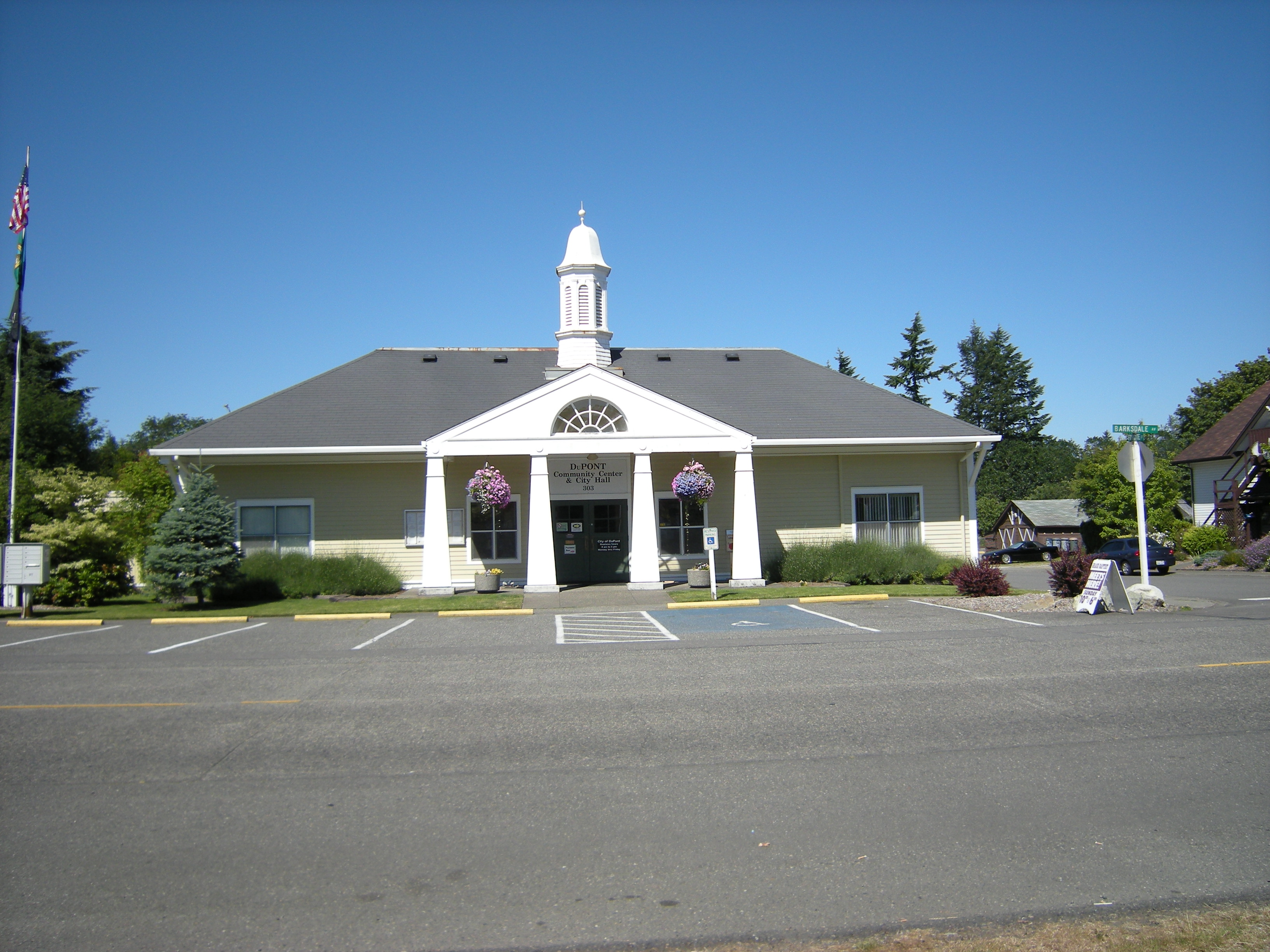
Dupont City Hall

A company town was set up about a mile east of the explosives manufacturing facility. By 1909, the village had two houses for the plant managers and 58 houses for the workers, which increased to over 100 houses by the end of 1917. The village was re-designated as the town of DuPont on March 26, 1912, but it was not officially incorporated as a town until 1951, when the company started selling the houses to the employees. The original company town, roughly bounded by Santa Cruz St, Penniman St, Brandywine Ave, and DuPont Ave, was added to the National Register of Historic Places as the DuPont Village Historic District in 1987.

The dynamite plant was shut down in 1975 and the land was subsequently purchased by the Weyerhaeuser company for $12 million. The initial plan was to use the 3,000 acres (1,200 ha) of land to construct a lumber export plant, but the company eventually decided to further develop the town under a New Urbanism model. DuPont, Weyerhaeuser, and the state Department of Ecology began decontamination of the original explosives plant site in 1991, with a golf course being built on the former location of the plant. In recent years, DuPont has undergone a transformation with the realization of the modern planned community of "Northwest Landing". The city is expected to have a built-out population of more than 12,000.

In 1975, the midden for the Sequalitchew Archeological site was added to the National Register of Historic Places, it being the oldest known midden in Washington.

=== Present day ===
DuPont remains a growing community. The elementary school in DuPont, Chloe Clark Elementary (which hosted kindergarten through fifth grade), reached capacity in the 2007–2008 school year. As a result, starting from the following school year, Steilacoom Historical School District realigned all three elementary schools. Chloe Clark Elementary and Cherrydale Primary in Steilacoom now only have students from grades K-3. Saltar's Point Elementary in Steilacoom now serves 4th and 5th grades. Pioneer Middle School relocated from Steilacoom to DuPont in August 2008. The new school received the LEED award for its "Green" Design elements.

DuPont is divided into several subdivisions, each with its own design style and/or building contractors. Northwest Landing is the most visible due to a sign along the freeway drawing attention to it. Several businesses have opened in the downtown area, but development has slowed in recent years. Hoffman Hill is the largest in area, and houses about 60% of the total population. The Historic Village, a residential area which is on the registry of historic places, is the only part of DuPont that is not a modern planned community. Bell Hill is considered the most expensive area of the city. DuPont features trails and green belts throughout, and is about 95% built-out according to the master plan.

On December 18, 2017, an Amtrak train derailed near DuPont, killing three people and injuring more than 100 others.

== Geography ==
According to the United States Census Bureau, the city has a total area of 5.88 square miles (15.23 km^{2}), of which 5.86 square miles (15.18 km^{2}) is land and 0.02 square miles (0.05 km^{2}) is water.

=== Sequalitchew Creek trail and beach ===
Within the city limits of DuPont, next to the city hall, lies the Sequalitchew Creek trail which can be accessed by the old narrow gauge railway roadbed which ran from the old Powderworks plant to Puget Sound. The trail leads to Sequalitchew Beach. The creek corridor hosts hundreds of species, including bald eagles, hawks, McKay's bunting, song birds, herons, ducks, owls, frogs, salamanders, snakes, beaver, raccoons, coyotes, deer, and rabbits. The waters off Sequalitchew Beach are inhabited by harbor seals, marbled murrelet and gray whales.

=== Other trails and wildlife areas ===
DuPont's other trails and its parks offer similar access to wildlife and exceptional opportunities for outdoor activity. The trail and greenbelt system provides a wide cross-section of DuPont's geographic and natural environments, while maintaining an urban feel. Full maps can be obtained from the visitor center, city hall, and the history museum.

== Demographics ==
Historical population
Census	Pop.	Note	%±
1920	600		—
1960	354		—
1970	384		8.5%
1980	559		45.6%
1990	592		5.9%
2000	2,452		314.2%
2010	8,199		234.4%
2020	10,151		23.8%
2021 (est.)	10,112		−0.4%
U.S. Decennial Census; 2020 Census

=== 2020 census ===
As of the 2020 census, DuPont had a population of 10,151. The median age was 32.4 years. 29.2% of residents were under the age of 18 and 8.8% of residents were 65 years of age or older. For every 100 females there were 97.1 males, and for every 100 females age 18 and over there were 92.8 males age 18 and over.

97.5% of residents lived in urban areas, while 2.5% lived in rural areas.

There were 3,652 households in DuPont, of which 44.0% had children under the age of 18 living in them. Of all households, 62.4% were married-couple households, 13.6% were households with a male householder and no spouse or partner present, and 20.4% were households with a female householder and no spouse or partner present. About 20.6% of all households were made up of individuals and 7.3% had someone living alone who was 65 years of age or older.

There were 3,791 housing units, of which 3.7% were vacant. The homeowner vacancy rate was 1.0% and the rental vacancy rate was 5.1%.

Racial composition as of the 2020 census
Race	Number	Percent
White	5,790	57.0%
Black or African American	863	8.5%
American Indian and Alaska Native	84	0.8%
Asian	1,359	13.4%
Native Hawaiian and Other Pacific Islander	126	1.2%
Some other race	379	3.7%
Two or more races	1,550	15.3%
Hispanic or Latino (of any race)	1,341	13.2%

=== 2010 census ===
As of the 2010 census, there were 8,199 people, 3,023 households, and 2,185 families residing in the city. The population density was 1,399.1 inhabitants per square mile (540.2/km^{2}). There were 3,241 housing units at an average density of 553.1 per square mile (213.6/km^{2}). The racial makeup of the city was 68.7% White, 8.1% African American, 0.5% Native American, 10.2% Asian, 1.1% Pacific Islander, 2.6% from other races, and 8.9% from two or more races. Hispanic or Latino of any race were 9.7% of the population.

There were 3,023 households, of which 47.6% had children under the age of 18 living with them, 58.0% were married couples living together, 11.6% had a female householder with no husband present, 2.7% had a male householder with no wife present, and 27.7% were non-families. 24.0% of all households were made up of individuals, and 6.9% had someone living alone who was 65 years of age or older. The average household size was 2.71 and the average family size was 3.27.

The median age in the city was 32 years. 33.4% of residents were under the age of 18; 5.2% were between the ages of 18 and 24; 37.1% were from 25 to 44; 17.2% were from 45 to 64; and 7.1% were 65 years of age or older. The gender makeup of the city was 47.2% male and 52.8% female.

=== 2000 census ===
As of the 2000 census, there were 2,452 people, 936 households, and 670 families residing in the city. The population density was 430.6 inhabitants per square mile (166.3/km^{2}). There were 977 housing units at an average density of 171.6 inhabitants per square mile (66.3/km^{2}). The racial makeup of the city was 74.63% White, 8.20% African American, 0.82% Native American, 7.34% Asian, 0.69% Pacific Islander, 2.24% from other races, and 6.08% from two or more races. Hispanic or Latino of any race were 6.36% of the population.

There were 936 households, out of which 40.1% had children under the age of 18 living with them, 63.8% were married couples living together, 6.0% had a female householder with no husband present, and 28.4% were non-families. 23.2% of all households were made up of individuals, and 3.7% had someone living alone who was 65 years of age or older. The average household size was 2.61 and the average family size was 3.12.

In the city, the population was spread out, with 29.9% under the age of 18, 5.0% from 18 to 24, 40.8% from 25 to 44, 17.8% from 45 to 64, and 6.5% who were 65 years of age or older. The median age was 32 years. For every 100 females, there were 93.7 males. For every 100 females age 18 and over, there were 94.2 males.

The median income for a household in the city was $52,969, and the median income for a family was $57,202. Males had a median income of $42,946 versus $36,741 for females. The per capita income for the city was $22,742. About 2.2% of families and 4.6% of the population were below the poverty line, including 3.5% of those under age 18 and 2.5% of those age 65 or over.

== Education ==
The city is in the Steilacoom Historical School District. Steilacoom High School is the district's comprehensive high school.
