= Steilacoom High School =

Location
- 54 Sentinel Drive; Steilacoom, Washington 98388; United States; 47°10′45″N 122°34′33″W

Information
- Type: Public high school
- Established: 1981
- School district: Steilacoom Historical School District
- Principal: Jacob Tyrrell
- Staff: 41.60 (FTE)
- Grades: 9-12
- Enrollment: 964 (2023–2024)
- Student to teacher ratio: 23.17
- Campus type: Closed
- Colors: Red & Gold
- Athletics conference: 2A SPSL Sound
- Mascot: Sentinels
- Newspaper: The Sentinel Sound
- Website: shs.steilacoom.k12.wa.us

Steilacoom High School (or SHS) is a public high school in Steilacoom, Washington, United States and is part of the Steilacoom Historical School District. It is the oldest, and to date the only, high school in the school district. Prior to its establishment, students attended grades 9–12 in the neighboring Tacoma School District and Clover Park School District. SHS was established in 1981 for grades 9 and 10, with grades 11 and 12 starting in the following two years. The facility underwent a $23 million modernization and expansion in 2007–09.

Communities in the district include: Steilacoom, Anderson Island, DuPont, and portions of Lakewood and University Place.

== Athletics ==
SHS offers a variety of seasonal sports:

- Fall: Boys Cross Country, Girls Cross Country, Boys Golf, Girls Golf, Football, Girls Soccer, Girls Swim, Boys Tennis, Volleyball
- Winter: Boys Basketball, Girls Basketball, Boys Swim, Boys Wrestling, Girls Wrestling, Girls Bowling, Girls Flag Football
- Spring: Baseball, Softball, Girls Tennis, Boys Soccer, Boys Track, Girls Track

== Notable alumni ==
- Cody Balogh, former American football offensive lineman
- Emeka Egbuka, Tampa Bay Buccaneers wide receiver
