= Skyking =

2026 documentary film

- Directed by: Patricia Gillespie
- Based on: 2018 Horizon Air Bombardier Q400 incident
- Produced by: Christopher Cowen; Linsey Romero; Abby Davis; Mary Lisio; Liz Massie; Lisa Remington; David Sloan; Claire Weinraub
- Cinematography: Víctor Tadashi Suárez; Jeremy Benning; Nathanial Harper
- Edited by: Emiliano Battista; Alexis Johnson
- Music by: Craig DeLeon
- Distributed by: Hulu
- Release date: 14 April 2026
- Running time: 70 minutes
- Country: United States
- Language: English

#Skyking, also known as #Skyking: Panic in the Sky, is a 2026 feature-length documentary film directed by Patricia Gillespie, and based on the events of the 2018 Horizon Air Bombardier Q400 incident, where Richard "Beebo" Russell stole a Bombardier Q400 with no intention of landing it.

The film was created in dedication to Richard Russell.

== Cast ==
- Connor Stoops as Richard "Beebo" Russell
  - Some voice audio of Richard during the events from the ATC and CVR were used in documentary.
- Colleen Connor
- Andreas Hyneman
- Karen Russell
- Danny Puntero
- Phil Puntero
- Amber Hewitt
- Mary Russell
- Hannah Russell

== Production ==
Production was done through a combination of pre-existing footage from the incident, and through CGI.

== Release ==
The film premiered at the 2026 South by Southwest Film & TV Festival in Austin, Texas on March 12, 2026. Once the premiering had wrapped, the film was released on Hulu and Disney+ on April 14, 2026.

== Reception ==
The film was given several positive reviews from critics on Rotten Tomatoes, John Anderson stated on the Wall Street Journal; "While Ms. Gillespie can’t solve the mystery of why exactly her subject did what he did, she has created a novel kind of crime film, one aided in no small way by what seems to be the complete flight recording from Russell’s mad act."

Johnny Loftus stated on Decider; "#SKYKING is at once a harrowing live audio journey into a dangerous airborne situation and an effective examination of the personal issues and cultural forces that led to it." Carla Hay stated on Culture Mix, one day after the film was released on Hulu and Disney+, stating; "The documentary #SkyKing gives empathetic perspectives of Richard 'Beebo' Russell and his mental health crisis that led to him stealing a Horizon Air plane (with no passengers on board) in 2018. Most of the people interviewed are his loved ones."

However, one negative review was made toward the film, specifically on the soundtrack, and it was from Chase Hutchinson of the Inlander stating; "Save for a more misguided musical choice near the end that sees the film falling prey to the online mythologizing that still surrounds the incident, it mostly manages to delve deeper into what happened and what it means all these years later."
