= Steilacoom, Washington =

- Town
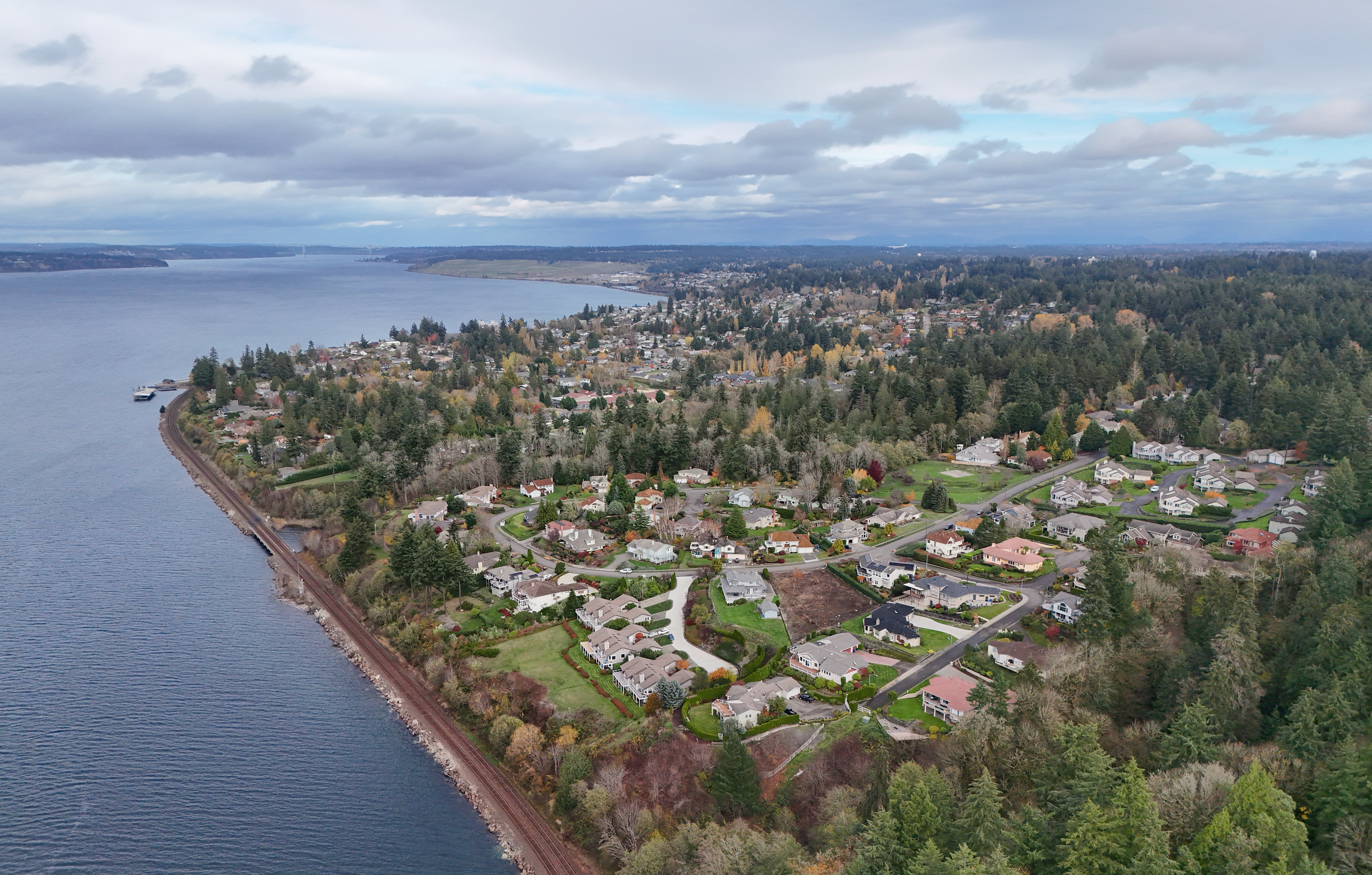
- Cormorant Park neighborhood

- Location of Steilacoom, Washington
- Coordinates: 47°10′12″N 122°35′36″W
- Country: United States
- State: Washington
- County: Pierce

Government
  - Mayor: Dick Muri

Area
  - Total: 2.05 sq mi (5.31 km^{2})
  - Land: 2.01 sq mi (5.21 km^{2})
  - Water: 0.042 sq mi (0.11 km^{2})
- Elevation: 213 ft (65 m)

Population (2020)
  - Total: 6,727
  - Density: 3,177.3/sq mi (1,226.75/km^{2})
- Time zone: UTC-8 (Pacific (PST))
  - Summer (DST): UTC-7 (PDT)
- ZIP code: 98388
- Area code: 253
- FIPS code: 53-67770
- GNIS feature ID: 2413332
- Website: townofsteilacoom.org

Steilacoom (/ˈstɪləkəm/ STIL-ə-kəm) is a town in Pierce County, Washington, United States. The population was 6,727 at the 2020 census. Steilacoom incorporated in 1854 and became the first incorporated town in what later became the state of Washington. It has also become a bedroom community for service members stationed at Joint Base Lewis–McChord, aka McChord AFB and Fort Lewis.

Based on per capita income, Steilacoom ranks 61st of 522 areas ranked in the state of Washington.

== Name ==
The origin of the name "Steilacoom" is unclear. According to the Legacy Washington program, the town's name is derived from a Native American word meaning "little pink flower". Another possibility is that it was named by fur traders with the Hudson's Bay Company (HBC) and is an adaptation of Tail-a-Koom, the name of a Native American chief. In 1824, chief factor John Work called the town "Chilacoom". Another early spelling was "Chelakom". The Town of Steilacoom says it was named after the Steilacoom tribe, especially their main village in the Tacoma area, located on Chambers Bay. Robert Hitchman noted in Place Names of Washington that Steilacoom Creek, which feeds into Chambers Creek, held the name before the town.

== History ==
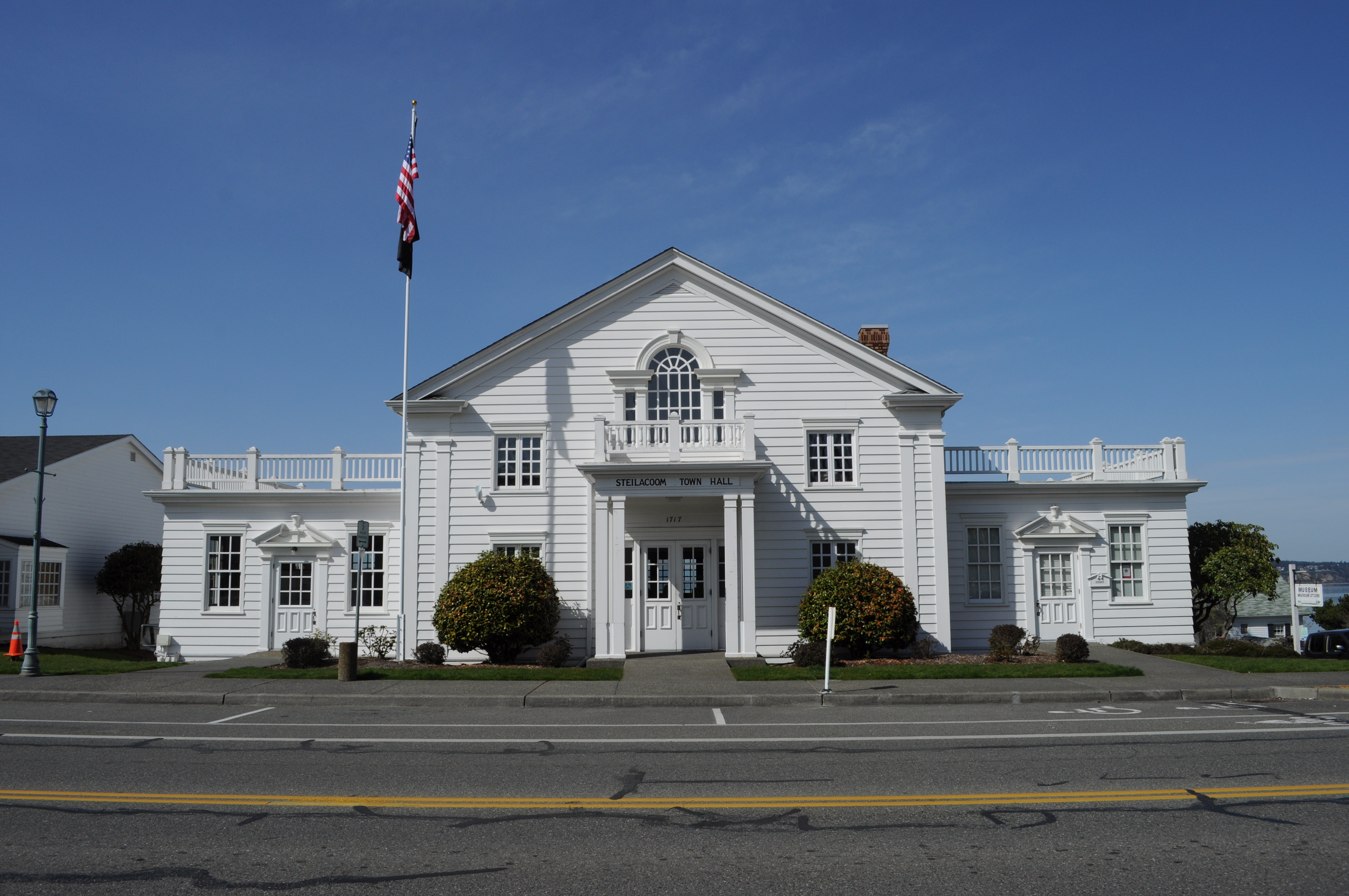
Town hall

The Steilacoom people, a Coast Salish tribe, lived in what became the city of Steilacoom. Their main village was called Scht’ləqʷəm, later anglicized as Steilacoom. William Bright says the name comes from the Southern Coast Salish subgroup /č'tílqʷəbš/, anglicized as "Steilacoom".

The United States Army established Fort Steilacoom in August 1849 following attacks on Fort Nisqually. European-American settlement at Steilacoom began with Lafayette Balch, a sea captain from Maine who arrived in 1851. The following year, Balch opened a sawmill to process and export lumber to San Francisco and named the settlement "Port Steilacoom". An adjacent settlement, Steilacoom City, was founded in June 1851 by John B. Chapman. The two settlements were merged into Steilacoom, which was named the county seat of Pierce County on December 12, 1852, and incorporated on April 22, 1854. Steilacoom was the first town in Washington Territory to be incorporated.

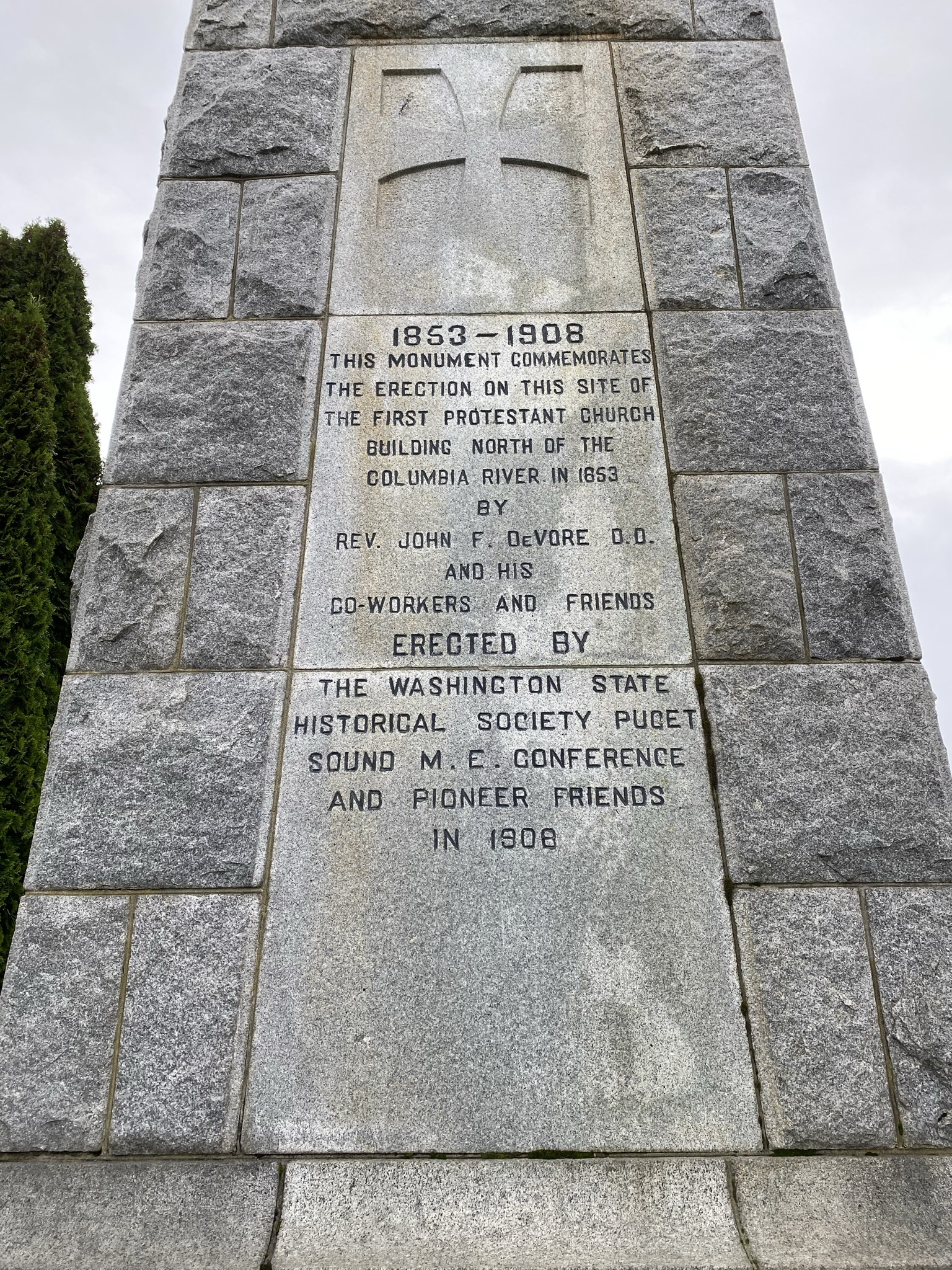
First Protestant Church North of the Columbia Monument

Steilacoom had the first jail in Washington and the first sawmill. It has four individual buildings and sites listed on the National Register of Historic Places, including the oldest Catholic Church in the state, the first Protestant Church north of the Columbia River, as well as the Steilacoom Historic District, with 68 contributing properties. The town remained prominent in the region until the construction of the Northern Pacific Railway, which opened in 1873 with a terminus in Tacoma. The county seat was moved from Steilacoom to Tacoma in 1880; an interurban streetcar was built in 1891 to connect the two cities. Fort Steilacoom was redeveloped into Western State Hospital, a state-run mental health facility that now lies in the adjacent and larger city of Lakewood.

== Geography ==
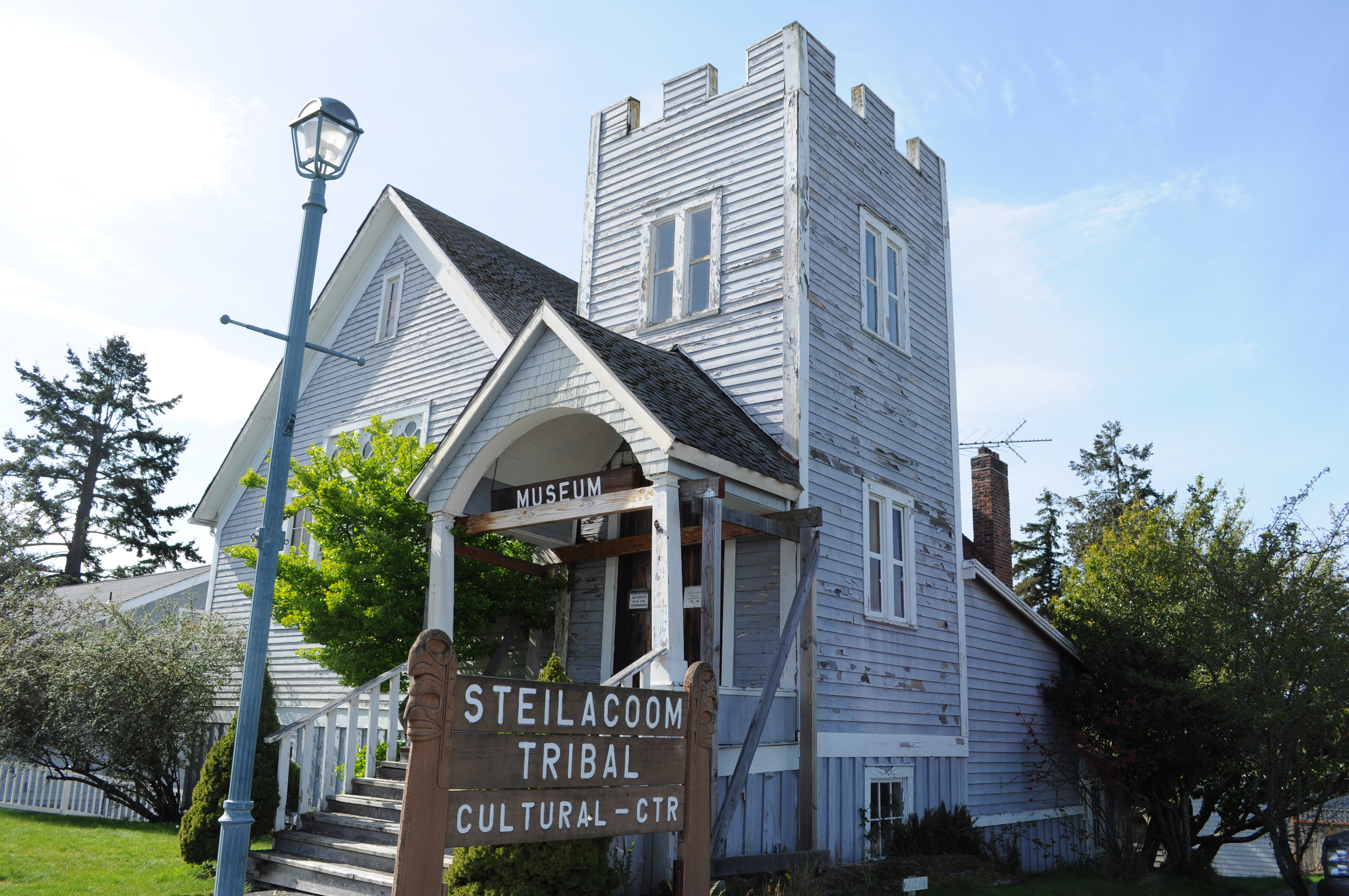
Steilacoom Tribal Cultural Center and Museum, a former church on Lafayette Street.

Steilacoom is situated on Puget Sound between the Nisqually River delta and the Tacoma Narrows. It sits across from Anderson and Ketron islands to the west and McNeil Island to the northwest. The city is bordered to the south by Joint Base Lewis–McChord, a major military installation, and to the north by Chambers Bay, a public golf course. According to the United States Census Bureau, the town has a total area of 2.07 square miles (5.36 km^{2}), of which, 2.04 square miles (5.28 km^{2}) is land and 0.03 square miles (0.08 km^{2}) is water.

== Transportation ==
There are no state highways in Steilacoom. Drivers can access Interstate 5 or State Route 512 by driving through the adjacent city of Lakewood.

BNSF operates a railroad running along Steilacoom's shoreline, with the Union Pacific Railroad having trackage rights on this line as well. However, there is no active station in the city and passenger trains do not stop there. Passenger service to the city ended in 1971. With the November 18, 2021 opening of the Point Defiance bypass route, Amtrak passenger service is now on an inland line from Tacoma through South Tacoma, Lakewood and DuPont, essentially parallel to Interstate 5. With this new route in operation, Steilacoom's rail line is now for freight only.

Pierce County maintains a Steilacoom-Anderson Island Ferry which departs from Steilacoom and serves Anderson and Ketron islands.

== Education ==
Public schools are operated by the Steilacoom Historical School District #1, which was first established in 1854.

Steilacoom High School is the district's comprehensive high school.

== Demographics ==
Historical population
Census	Pop.	Note	%±
1880	250		—
1890	270		8.0%
1900	284		5.2%
1910	430		51.4%
1920	564		31.2%
1930	722		28.0%
1940	832		15.2%
1950	1,233		48.2%
1960	1,569		27.3%
1970	2,850		81.6%
1980	4,886		71.4%
1990	5,728		17.2%
2000	6,049		5.6%
2010	5,985		−1.1%
2020	6,727		12.4%
U.S. Decennial Census; 2020 Census

=== 2010 census ===
As of the 2010 census, there were 5,985 people, 2,559 households, and 1,715 families residing in the town. The population density was 2,933.8 inhabitants per square mile (1,132.7/km^{2}). There were 2,793 housing units at an average density of 1,369.1 per square mile (528.6/km^{2}). The racial makeup of the town was 77.1% White, 4.7% African American, 0.7% Native American, 7.3% Asian, 1.4% Pacific Islander, 1.5% from other races, and 7.3% from two or more races. Hispanic or Latino of any race were 6.7% of the population.

There were 2,559 households, of which 26.9% had children under the age of 18 living with them, 50.3% were married couples living together, 12.2% had a female householder with no husband present, 4.5% had a male householder with no wife present, and 33.0% were non-families. 26.7% of all households were made up of individuals, and 8.5% had someone living alone who was 65 years of age or older. The average household size was 2.34 and the average family size was 2.79.

The median age in the town was 42.4 years. 20.3% of residents were under the age of 18; 9.2% were between the ages of 18 and 24; 23.5% were from 25 to 44; 29.6% were from 45 to 64; and 17.4% were 65 years of age or older. The gender makeup of the town was 48.3% male and 51.7% female.

=== 2000 census ===
As of the 2000 census, there were 6,049 people, 2,570 households, and 1,721 families residing in the town. The population density was 2,916.9 people per square mile (1,128.3/km^{2}). There were 2,674 housing units at an average density of 1,289.4 per square mile (498.8/km^{2}). The racial makeup of the town was 78.46% White, 6.70% African American, 0.84% Native American, 5.87% Asian, 0.61% Pacific Islander, 1.65% from other races, and 5.87% from two or more races. Hispanic or Latino of any race were 5.41% of the population.

There were 2,570 households, out of which 27.8% had children under the age of 18 living with them, 53.8% were married couples living together, 9.8% had a female householder with no husband present, and 33.0% were non-families. 26.5% of all households were made up of individuals, and 7.2% had someone living alone who was 65 years of age or older. The average household size was 2.35 and the average family size was 2.83.

In the town, the age distribution of the population showed 22.8% under the age of 18, 9.2% from 18 to 24, 28.6% from 25 to 44, 26.0% from 45 to 64, and 13.3% who were 65 years of age or older. The median age was 38 years. For every 100 females, there were 96.5 males. For every 100 females age 18 and over, there were 93.4 males.

The median income for a household in the town was $46,113, and the median income for a family was $54,725. Males had a median income of $40,505 versus $34,136 for females. The per capita income for the town was $27,124. About 6.9% of families and 8.1% of the population were below the poverty line, including 15.0% of those under age 18 and 3.7% of those age 65 or over.

== Notable residents ==
- Emeka Egbuka, American football player
- Clara Antoinette McCarty Wilt, the first graduate from the University of Washington
- Nick Brown, Attorney General for the State of Washington.
