= Steilacoom =

Steilacoom may refer to:

== People ==
- Steilacoom people, an historical Coast Salish tribe who lived near the Puget Sound
- Steilacoom Tribe of Indians, a contemporary heritage group, unrecognized as a tribe

== Places ==
- Fort Steilacoom, a former US Army outpost near Lake Steilacoom
- Fort Steilacoom Park, the largest park in Lakewood, Washington
- Lake Steilacoom, a lake in Pierce County, Washington, approximately 2.5 miles southwest of Tacoma, Washington
- Steilacoom Creek, an older name for Chambers Creek, in Washington State
- Steilacoom, Washington, a town in Pierce County, Washington
- Colloquially, in Washington State, "Steilacoom" is also used to refer to Western State Hospital, although the hospital is actually in the neighboring city of Lakewood, Washington
