= Clover Creek (Washington) =

Stream in Washington, United States

Coordinates: 47°9′25″N 122°31′43″W

Map of Clover Creek

Clover Creek is a creek in Pierce County, Washington. Clover Creek rises near Frederickson, flows through Spanaway and Parkland, is diverted under the main runway of McChord Air Force Base and Interstate 5, and into Lakewood, where it spills into Lake Steilacoom.

The creek was named for the wild clover growing along its course. Its drainage basin is 74 square miles (190 km^{2}). The creek is 13.8 miles (22.2 km) long. Clover Creek was the traditional home of the Sastuck band of the Steilacoom Tribe of Indians.
