= Fort Steilacoom Park =

Park in Washington, United States

Coordinates: 47.17°N 122.56°W

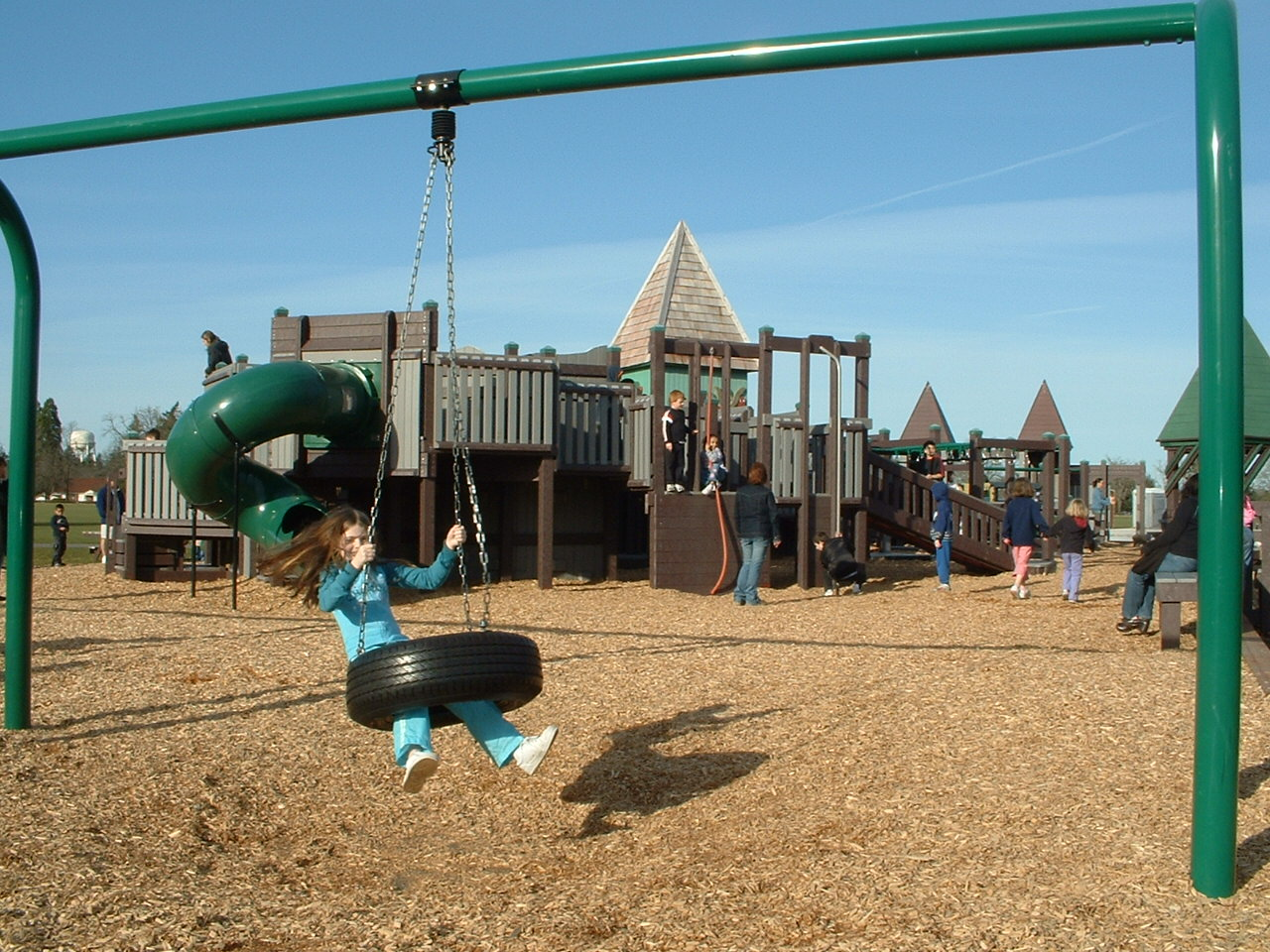
Children play on the playground at Fort Steilacoom Park.

Fort Steilacoom Park in Lakewood, Washington is the largest park in the city. The 340-acre (1.4 km^{2}) park includes Waughop Lake, an off-leash dog park, and several soccer fields and baseball fields. It is adjacent to Pierce College, historic Fort Steilacoom, and Western State Hospital.

The area became a homesteader's farm circa 1844, then became Fort Steilacoom in 1849. In 1868, the government purchased it for use as the "Insane Asylum for Washington Territory". Hospital residents grew crops and orchards in the park area, and planted many of the poplar trees that line the lake shore. More than 3,000 hospital residents are buried in the cemetery near the parking lot.

The park is the site of high school cross country meets in the fall and Pierce College utilizes it for athletic activities. In September or October the Fort Steilacoom Invite is held, hosted by Lakes High School. It is currently the second largest meet in Washington state.

Other events that occur here include the Lakewood Farmers Market, The Lakewood SummerFest, and the Fiesta de la Familia.
