= Death of Adre-Anna Jackson =

Unsolved 2005 child murder in Washington state

Coordinates: 47.123°N 122.535°W

Adre-Anna Jackson
- Born: 1995; Lakewood, Washington, U.S.
- Died: April 2006 (aged 10–11); Lakewood, Washington, U.S.

Adre-Anna Anita Jackson, also spelled Adreanna or Adre'Anna was a missing person of Native American descent from Lakewood, Washington. She disappeared at age 10 while walking to school in December 2005 in "a high-crime area with a large number of registered sex offenders". Her mother had sent her out on a three-block walk not knowing school had been canceled because of snow and did not report her missing until late in the day.

== Search, death investigation and suspects ==
In April 2006, her skeletonized body was found by children in a thicket near 7500 block of 146th Street Southwest in Tillicum in an abandoned lot that was "a popular passageway for school-aged children and a hangout for transients and drug users", identified as Jackson by use of her dental records. The finding followed a highly publicized search by bloodhounds and 120 personnel from the Lakewood police and fire departments, search-and-rescue teams from Pierce County and nearby Joint Base Lewis-McChord, and sonar scans of American Lake off Silcox Island organized by the Federal Bureau of Investigation (FBI). Investigators determined the death was suspicious but had not determined the exact cause of death as of 2017.

Child murderer Terapon Adhahn was a person of interest in the case and his former home was searched for evidence in 2007.

Her death appeared on the FBI's most wanted list from 2005 through 2019. As of 2020, there was a $60,000 cash reward – contributed by the FBI, local authorities, and individuals – for information leading to her killer or killers.

=== Cold case unit involvement ===
The case remained unsolved as of April 2025, when the Washington State Attorney General's cold case unit, formed in 2023, reviewed the case for potential investigation by the unit.

== See also ==
- List of solved missing person cases (post-2000)
- List of unsolved murders (2000–present)
- Missing and murdered Indigenous women
