= Lakewood Playhouse =

- Interactive map of Lakewood Playhouse
- Location: Washington
- Coordinates: 47°09′56″N 122°30′50″W

Lakewood Playhouse is a theatre in Lakewood, Washington.

== History ==
Lakewood Playhouse was founded in 1938. They currently have a 180-seat theatre in the Tacoma area, at the Lakewood Towne Center.
