= Waughop Lake =

- Location within Washington (state) Location within the United States
- Location: Lakewood, Pierce County, Washington
- Coordinates: 47°10′13″N 122°33′55″W
- Type: lake
- Primary inflows: groundwater
- Primary outflows: none
- Basin countries: United States
- Surface area: 33 acres (13 ha)
- Average depth: 7 ft (2.1 m)
- Surface elevation: 226 ft (69 m)

Waughop Lake is a lake less than 1.6 km (1.0 mi) east of Steilacoom in Pierce County, Washington, United States. The lake lies within Fort Steilacoom Park, in the city of Lakewood, Washington. Waughop Lake has a surface area of approximately 33 acres (130,000 m^{2}) and a mean depth of 7 feet (2.1 m). The lake is fed by groundwater and has no surface drainage channels.

The lake is named after Dr. John Wesley Waughop, former superintendent of the Washington State Hospital for the Insane. The hospital, now known as Western State Hospital, lies across from the park on Steilacoom Boulevard SW. Remnants of part of the hospital are incorporated into the trail. The lake is circled by a 9/10-mile paved loop trail.

Waughop Lake is refilled with trout that, unless caught, die within a few weeks. One of the primary researchers of this lake, Michele La Fontaine, has done studies on the algae and dissolved oxygen content. The depth fluctuates about 2 feet a year, gaining 2 feet in winter and losing 2 feet due to evaporation.

== History ==
Ash from Mount Mazama sits at about 420 cm deep, indicating that Waughop Lake is well over 8,000 years old.

=== Western State Hospital ===
For about 65 years, Western State Hospital used the land around the lake as farmland. Manure and other agricultural waste were dumped into the lake. This contributes to the abundance of algae in the lake.

=== Modern history ===
In 2020 and 2023 the lake was treated with alum to reduce algae and improve water quality. Volunteer groups visit the lake regularly to do planting and weeding.

== Life ==
Waughop Lake is home to many animals and plants, including mallards, deer, Canada geese, raccoons, robins, squirrels, and other small birds.

== Algae ==
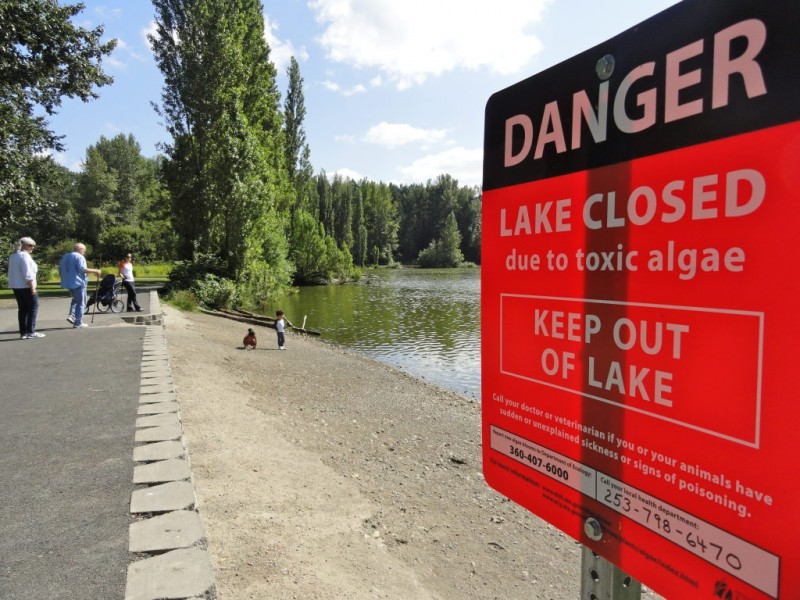
A sign at Waughop lake says that the lake is closed.

Algae in Waughop Lake has affected the lake for a long time. The algae are fed by nitrogen, supplied by the duck droppings and sediment, which the lake has plenty of. There are serious algae blooms, and it is not advisable to come into contact with the water. During algae blooms, the lake may be closed or restricted to visitors. For some of the year, fishing is restricted due to the algae problem. The bulk of the algae is green cyanobacteria, a phylum or waterborne photosynthesizing prokaryotes.
