= Steilacoom people =

Historical Native American tribe in Washington, United States

Steilacoom
Total population
- Extinct as a sovereign entity At least 3 (including those of ancestral descent)

Regions with significant populations
- Washington, United States

Languages
- Lushootseed (Southern), English

Religion
- Traditional folk religion; Christianity, incl. syncretic forms

Related ethnic groups
- Other Lushootseed-speaking peoples, esp. the Puyallup and Nisqually peoples

The Steilacoom people (Lushootseed: č̓tilqʷəbš) are Lushootseed-speaking Southern Coast Salish people, Indigenous to the southern Puget Sound region of Washington state.

== Name ==
The name Steilacoom is an anglicization of their Lushootseed endonym. In their native Lushootseed language, their name is č̓tilqʷəbš. The name is derived from sč̓itilqʷəb, the name of the main Steilacoom village in historic times. The name means "near the water."

In English, the Steilacoom have also been called Stailakoom, Chillacum, Scht'ilaqwam, Steilacoomamish, Steilaquamish, Steilakumamish, and Stelakubalish.

== Territory and subdivisions ==
By 1855, the Steilacoom controlled a large portion (approximately 10,000 acres) of the Tacoma Basin and the nearby coastline, with their core land base being the area surrounding Steilacoom Creek and what is now Steilacoom, Washington. Within their territory were two major waterways: Steilacoom Creek (Lushootseed: sč̓itilqʷəb) and Sequalitchew Creek (Lushootseed: sčəgʷaliču). The islands of Anderson, McNeil, and Fox were also used by the Steilacoom. These islands, as well as the Nisqually River's delta, were not owned by one people, and instead were shared equally between the groups of the vicinity, including the Steilacoom.

They neighbored the Puyallup and Nisqually, to whom they are closely related culturally and linguistically. Various writers have classified the Steilacoom as a part of the Puyallup and Nisqually, however this stems primarily from the terms being used as a stand-in for all the related peoples of the southern Puget Sound area.

Historically, the Steilacoom were not a unified people. There were five original bands which today make up the Steilacoom. These bands include the Steilacoom, the Sastuck, the Spanaway, the Tlithlow, and the Sequalitchew. The Steilacoom proper originally controlled just Steilacoom Creek. The Sastuck were on Clover Creek, the Spanaway were on Lake Spanaway, the Tlithlow were on Murray Creek, and the Sequalitchew were located on Sequalitchew Creek.

An archaeological site on the north shore of Chambers Creek in Pierce County, Washington, was confirmed by Western Washington University archaeologist Herbert C. Taylor Jr. as being a Steilacoom summer encampment.

== History ==
The Steilacoom were one of the first peoples affected by colonization in western Washington, as the first trading post, army post, church, and town located north of the Columbia River were founded inside their territory. In 1849, Fort Steilacoom was constructed on their land, located about 6 miles north of Fort Nisqually. In the writings of Hudson's Bay Company factors William F. Tolmie and John McLaughlin, as well as in the writers of the fort's staff, the Steilacoom are mentioned heavily. Later, in 1850, Port Steilacoom was built at their main settlement, and a year later, Steilacoom City was built just upriver. Prior to European contact, the Steilacoom were believed to number around 500. However, their population was decimated by colonization and several vicious smallpox epidemics, together claiming up to two-thirds of their total population. By 1853, their population was reported by Fort Steilacoom officers to be at 175, and by 1854, it had decreased to just 25 individuals.

In 1854, the Steilacoom were signatory to the Treaty of Medicine Creek, under which they ceded their land to the United States in return for a reservation. They did not receive a reservation inside their territory; they were instead instructed to remove to the nearby Puyallup, Nisqually, and Squaxin Island reservations. Following this, many of the remaining Steilacoom families settled on the nearby reservations. Others moved to the Skokomish and Port Madison reservations, while some still stayed behind.

From 1855 to 1856, during the Puget Sound War, the Steilacoom were forcibly removed from their territory and placed on Fox Island by J. V. Weber, Indian agent.

By 1900, just four pockets of the Steilacoom remained off-reservation, at Steilacoom, DuPont, Roy, and Yelm. The leader of the Steilacoom at this time was John Steilacoom, who died shortly later in 1906. His older cousin Joseph McKay became leader following his death, and would later move to the Puyallup Reservation.

== Culture and society ==
For the Steilacoom, the highest level of governance was the village. Villages were autonomous, and although they were linked via alliance and shared customs, language, culture, and history, they were truly autonomous and one had no formalized authority over another. Married women generally settled in the husband's village, and people tended to marry outside of their village. During the winter, the village was the focus of all economic and social activity. However, during the summer, people left their village and traveled to other villages in which they had relatives or friends to pursue summer hunting, fishing, and gathering activities.

The Steilacoom were primarily reliant on fishing for their food. Although they neighbored peoples who were more reliant on hunting, due to their locality on the coast and small creeks, they did not rely as much on hunting and adopted the horse later than their neighbors like the Nisqually. When the Steilacoom did go hunting, they generally traveled to general hunting grounds not owned exclusively by themselves.

=== Language ===
The traditional language of the Steilacoom is Lushootseed (also called Puget Sound Salish), of which they spoke the southern dialect.

== Steilacoom Tribe ==
The Steilacoom Tribe is an unrecognized tribe based in Steilacoom Washington which claims descent from the historic Steilacoom people. They are neither a federally recognized tribe nor a state-recognized tribe. The organization has attempted to seek recognition and/or compensation from the federal government since 1929. Most recently, they were denied federal recognition in 2008.

The organization is run by a nine-member council, led by a chairperson. From 1975 until her death, Joan Ortez served as chairperson following the resignation of Lewis Layton. As of 1986 the group claimed about 615 members. As of 2003 there were 665 members, and as of 2008 there were 800 members. The Bureau of Indian Affairs found in 2008 that only three of the members were descended from 19th or 20th century Steilacoom people.

The group formed the Steilacoom Tribal Museum Association in 2019, under which they operate facilities like a museum, cafe, and business office.

== See also ==
- Puyallup people
- Nisqually people
