= Roger BelAir =

Author and entrepreneur

Roger BelAir is a successful entrepreneur, author, and keynote speaker at business conventions. However, he is best known for introducing the game of pickleball into jails and prisons in US.

== Career ==
In the 1980s Roger was a Vice President of Seattle-First National Bank, the largest bank in the Pacific Northwest at that time. While maintaining his banking career, he and Nick Briney founded BelAir & Briney, an investment company. In 1984 the firm was profiled in the cover story of Money magazine.

In 1987, he published his book titled ''Make a Fortune Buying Discount Mortgages'' at Doubleday publishers. This was followed by ‘’How to Borrow Money from a Banker: A Business Owner’s Guide'' published by the American Management Association. The success of the banking book led to Roger being a popular presenter at business conventions around the country on the topics of finance and dealing with financial institutions.

== Involvement in Pickleball ==
In 2017 CBS's 60 Minutes aired a segment on Sheriff Tom Dart who runs Chicago's Cook Country Jail. While watching the program, Roger observed many of the inmates were simply playing cards or watching TV and decided to introduce pickleball in the prisons.

He contacted Sheriff Dart and offered his services which were accepted. The introduction of the game at the jail proved to be a huge success. Disciplinary problems were reduced and gang members who previously wouldn't talk to each other played pickleball together. His introduction of the game in Chicago was featured in a front-page story in USA Today. The success of his program in Chicago led Roger to various prisons in various states.

Pickleball is currently the fastest-growing sport in the country. Others now are replicating Roger's efforts by teaching the game at prisons in their communities. In 2023 he co-founded PICLeague.org, a non-profit that supports instructors who are replicating his efforts and teaching the game in prisons. The game is now being played in 82 prisons across 25 states. Pickleball in Prison™, a documentary about Roger and his work in prisons, is in production now from producer Daniel Ostroff. The California Department of Corrections and Rehabilitation published a story about the filming, on their website. https://www.cdcr.ca.gov/insidecdcr/2024/12/04/pickleball-in-prison-filming-enhances-rehabilitation/
