= Trenchcoat Robbers =

The Trenchcoat Robbers, Ray Lewis Bowman and William Arthur "Billy" Kirkpatrick, are a pair of bank robbers from the United States. Their biggest heist was the February 1997 robbery of a Seafirst Bank branch in Lakewood, Washington that netted $4.4 million. Their modus operandi involved picking the lock of closed banks, tying up the employees, and stealing from the vault. Their first robbery is believed to have happened in September 1982. Their disguises included trenchcoats, wigs, fake mustaches, hats and glasses. They are believed to have robbed 28 banks in the United States.

Kirkpatrick was arrested after a search of his car resulting from a speeding ticket showed that he had four guns, two bags of fake mustaches, a key-making machine, locksmith tools and nearly two million dollars in two padlocked footlockers. Kirkpatrick's girlfriend was arrested and charged with aiding and abetting after trying to post Kirkpatrick's bail. She then told police that his partner was a man named Ray. Ray Bowman was arrested after a search of his house turned up guns, money and other evidence.

The statute of limitations had expired for many of their robberies by the time they were arrested. Two men had earlier been arrested for allegedly robbing an armored car and charged with two of the Trenchcoat robberies. The two robbery convictions were later overturned. Kirkpatrick was sentenced to fifteen years and eight months in prison on August 19, 1999; he was Federal inmate # 15294-047 and was released on 1 July 2011. Bowman was sentenced to twenty-four years and six months in prison. Bowman was Federal inmate # 10431-045 and died while in prison at age 67 on 6 May 2011 per the Federal Bureau of Prisons website.
