= Lakewood Catholic Parish Family =

Latin Catholic parish family in Lakewood, Washington

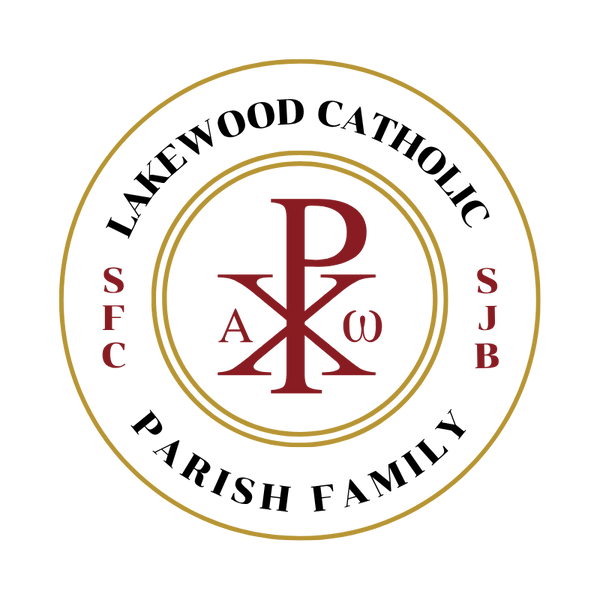
- Logo
- Founded: July 1, 2024
- Type: Latin Catholic Parish Family
- Location: Lakewood, Washington, United States
- Region served: Lakewood and surrounding areas, Pierce County, Washington
- Pastor: Rev. Louis R. Cunningham
- Parent organization: Archdiocese of Seattle
- Website: lakewoodcatholic.org

The Lakewood Catholic Parish Family is an American Latin Catholic parish family in the Archdiocese of Seattle in Lakewood, Washington, United States, comprising two parishes, St. Frances Cabrini and St. John Bosco, sharing a single pastor under the Archdiocese of Seattle's Partners in the Gospel restructuring initiative meant to combat the priest shortage in the archdiocese and wider United States. The parish family was established on July 1, 2024, and given the Parish number 37 when the archdiocese reorganized its 136 parishes into 60 parish families.

The two parishes share staff and programs while retaining separate worship sites. The main parish, St. Frances Cabrini, runs the affiliated St. Frances Cabrini Catholic School, while the St. John Bosco Parish canonically administers the active Church of the Immaculate Conception mission in nearby Steilacoom.

== Background ==
=== Lakewood, Washington ===
Lakewood, Washington is a city in Pierce County, about 10 miles (16 km) south of downtown Tacoma. For long an unincorporated community, Lakewood was incorporated on February 28, 1996, becoming Pierce County's second-largest city. Its population grew rapidly between 1939 and 1949, from roughly 3,000 to 17,000, largely due to the expansion of nearby military installations. The city now has nearly 64,000 residents and a substantial military population from the adjacent Joint Base Lewis–McChord.

=== Partners in the Gospel ===
Partners in the Gospel is a pastoral planning initiative the Archdiocese of Seattle announced in January 2023 in response to declining engagement and a shortage of priests. The archdiocese announced final parish family assignments on February 3, 2024, and the restructuring took effect July 1, 2024, consolidating 136 parishes into 60 parish families, each led by one pastor. Each family is expected to operate jointly for about three years before merging into a single canonical parish.

St. Frances Cabrini and St. John Bosco were assigned together as Parish Family 37 in the Tacoma–Pierce County deanery.

== Parish leadership ==
Clergy and staff shared across both parishes, as of 2024:

| Role | Name |
|---|---|
| Pastor | Rev. Louis R. Cunningham |
| Parochial Vicar | Rev. Dean Mbuzi |
| Senior Priest in residence | Rev. Paul J. Brunet |
| Deacon | George Mounce |
| Deacon | Jeff Greer |
| Deacon | Mauricio Anaya |
| Pastoral Associate for Faith Formation | Gabriela Grossman |
| Director of Music, Liturgy & Parish Life | Joe Greey |
| Director of Communications, Small Groups, Charitable Works | Fabiana Pacheco |
| Director of Sacraments and Youth Catechesis | Susy Martinez |

== Member parishes ==
=== St. Frances Cabrini Catholic Parish ===
St. Frances Cabrini Catholic Parish
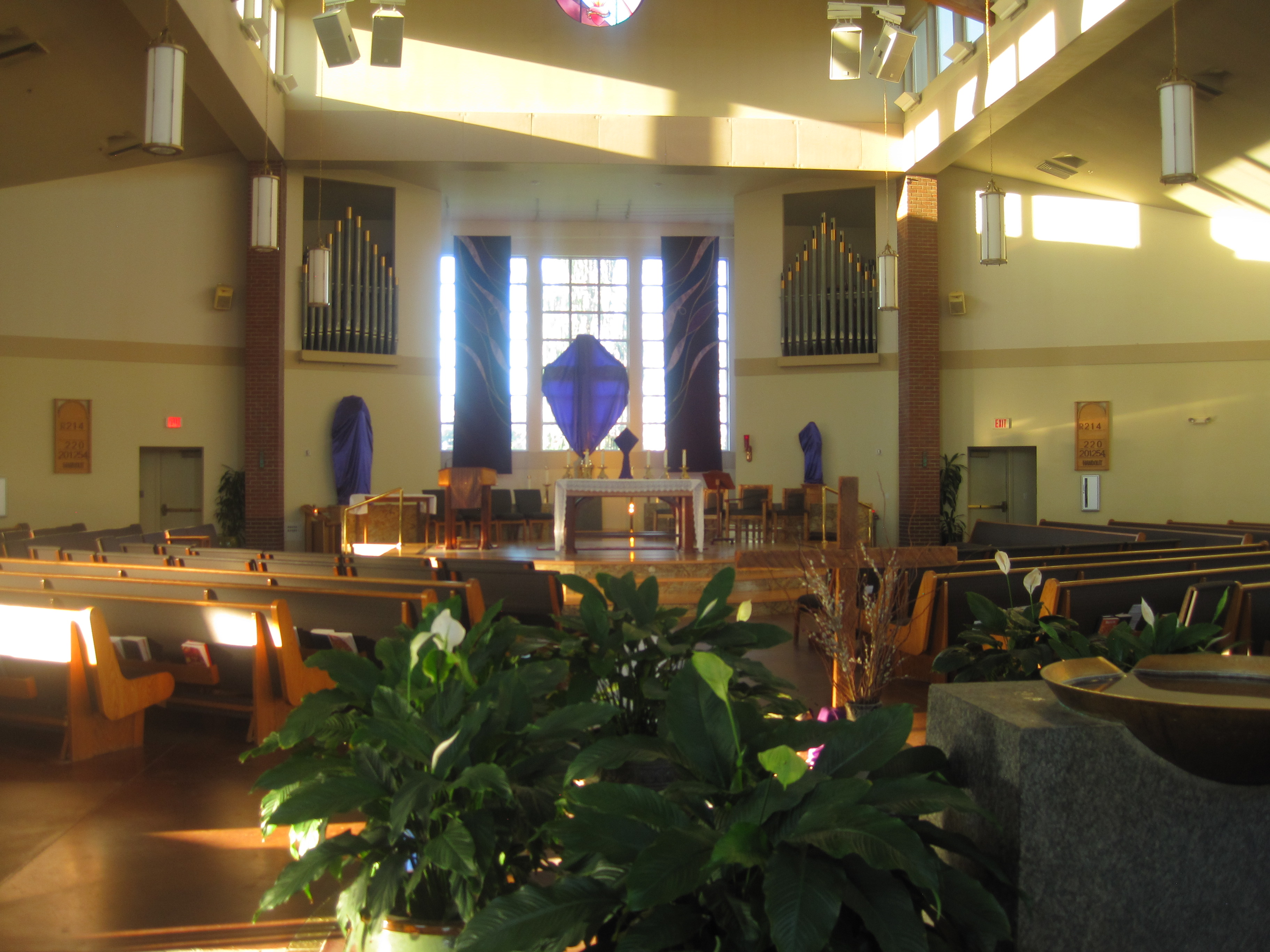
- The nave, photographed in 2026
- St. Frances Cabrini Catholic Parish
- 47.1601°N 122.5122°W
- Location: 5715 108th Street SW, Lakewood, Washington 98499
- Denomination: Catholic
- Sui iuris church: Latin Church
- Website: cabrini.us

History
- Founded: January 18, 1952
- Dedication: Frances Xavier Cabrini

Administration
- Archdiocese: Archdiocese of Seattle

Clergy
- Vicar: Rev. Dean Mbuzi
- Pastor: Rev. Louis R. Cunningham

St. Frances Cabrini is the older of the two parishes, and the one used for rites of initiation, due to its larger size; It was founded in 1952 and named after Saint Frances Xavier Cabrini, the first U.S. citizen canonized by the Catholic Church.

Archbishop Thomas A. Connolly established the parish on January 18, 1952; its first Mass was celebrated ten days later in the gymnasium of Visitation Villa, a Catholic girls' school on the site now occupied by Lakewood Towne Center. St. Frances Cabrini Catholic School opened the following year, staffed by Holy Names Sisters living in the on-site Cabrini Convent, and the current church building was dedicated in 1964.

School enrollment declined through the 1970s as fewer women religious were available to teach; the convent closed in 1986 and became parish offices. The parish marked its 50th anniversary in 2003, and the school received its third consecutive accreditation from the Western Catholic Educational Association in 2017.

Mass is celebrated in the only in the Mass of Paul VI in both English and Spanish, with a Swahili Mass on the third Sunday of each month. Ministries include catechetical formation, the OCIA program, and Eucharistic adoration. St. Frances Cabrini Catholic School, at 5621 108th Street SW, offers pre-K through grade eight.

Mass schedule (as of 2026) (Note: All Masses at St. Frances Cabrini are celebrated in the Novus Ordo):

- Sunday: 8:00 AM, 10:00 AM, 12:30 PM (Spanish); Swahili Mass every third Sunday
- Weekday: Mon–Thu 7:30 AM, Fri 8:30 AM
- Vigil (Saturday): 5:00 PM
- Reconciliation: Thursday 4:00–6:00 PM, Saturday 3:00–4:45 PM
- Eucharistic adoration: First Fridays after 8:30 AM Mass; First Saturdays 6 PM–6 AM

==== 2021 Mass disruption ====
On October 24, 2021, a man disrupted the 11:00 AM Sunday Mass at St. Frances Cabrini and was physically restrained by parishioners near the altar after approaching pastor Fr. Paul Brunet; the incident was captured on video that circulated widely online. The man had been served a no-trespass order on October 11 following weeks of what the parish described as abusive and threatening conduct toward staff, and was arrested and booked for criminal trespass after returning to the church in violation of that order. In a letter to parishioners, Brunet wrote that the parish and school had worked with local police and private security to increase safety measures following the incident.

== St. John Bosco Catholic Parish ==
St. John Bosco Catholic Parish
- St. John Bosco Catholic Parish
- 47.1554°N 122.5775°W
- Location: 10508 112th Street SW, Lakewood, Washington 98498
- Denomination: Catholic
- Sui iuris church: Latin Church
- Website: stjbosco.org

History
- Founded: June 1, 1968
- Dedication: John Bosco

Administration
- Archdiocese: Archdiocese of Seattle

Clergy
- Vicar: Rev. Dean Mbuzi
- Pastor: Rev. Louis R. Cunningham

St. John Bosco Parish, founded in 1968, is named for Saint John Bosco (1815–1888), the Italian priest who founded the Salesians of Don Bosco and is known for his work with disadvantaged youth. He was canonized in 1934; his feast day is January 31, and he is patron saint of youth, students, apprentices, and editors. Although formally established in 1968, the parish traces its lineage to the first Catholic church built in Washington Territory.

The parish traces its roots to the Church of the Immaculate Conception in Steilacoom, the oldest Catholic church in what is now the Archdiocese of Seattle, built by soldiers at Fort Steilacoom around 1857 and moved to its current downtown Steilacoom site in 1864. It served as the region's mother church until 1880 and has since been a mission chapel, administered by St. John Bosco Parish today.

Archbishop Connolly canonically established St. John Bosco Parish itself in June 1968, drawing its parish territory from Visitation Parish and St. Frances Cabrini Parish. In November 1971 the current church was dedicated by Archbishop Conolly. A 1991 expansion added a parish hall and offices, and a Blessed Sacrament Chapel and prayer garden followed in 1998.

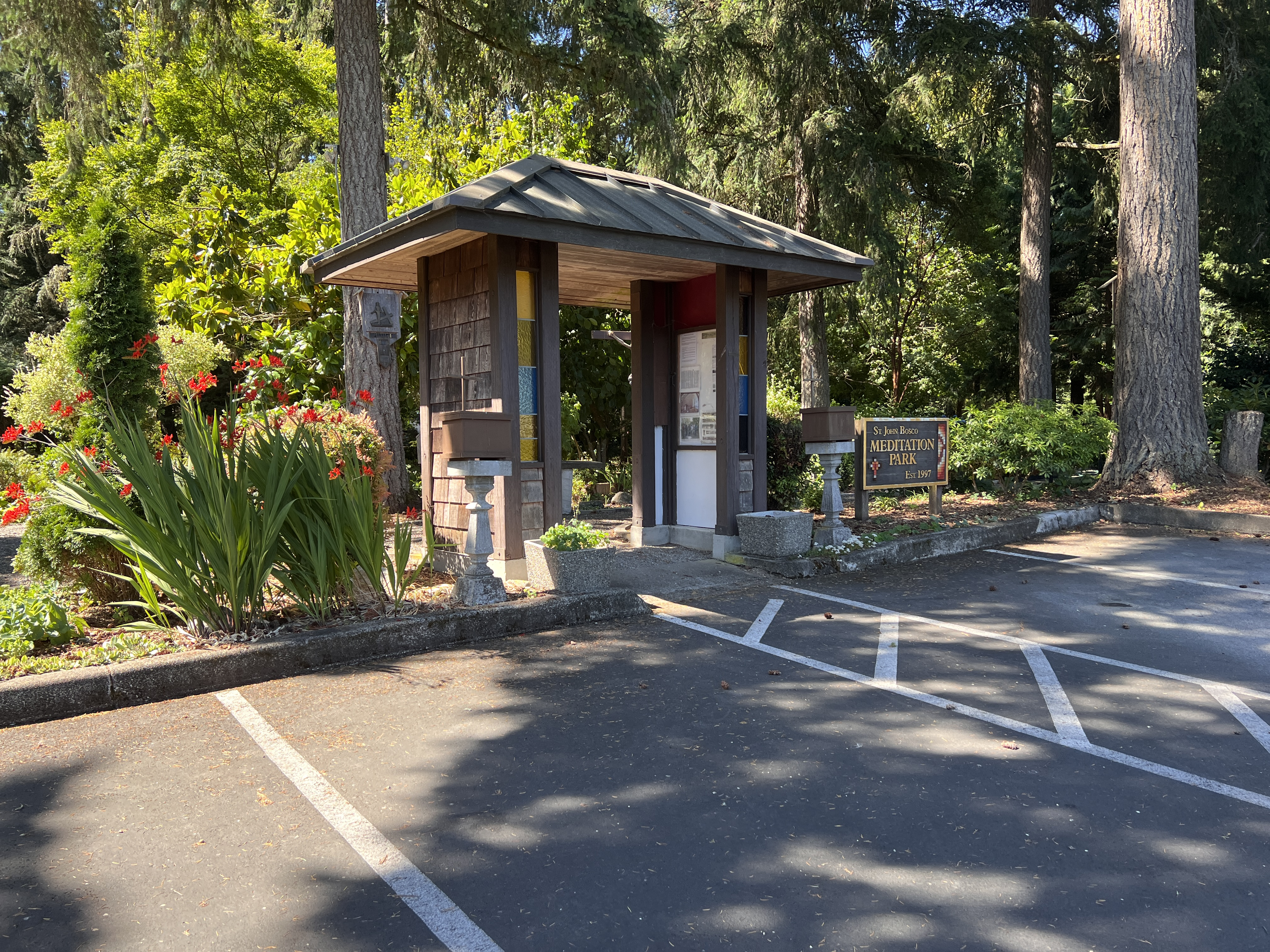
Entrance to the prayer garden, 2025

As part of the Lakewood Catholic Parish Family, St. John Bosco shares ministries with St. Frances Cabrini, including catechetical formation, Bible study, and Eucharistic ministries.

Mass schedule (Note: All Masses at St. John Bosco are celebrated in the Novus Ordo) (as of 2024):

- Sunday: 10:00 AM
- Vigil (Saturday): 5:00 PM
- Reconciliation: Saturday after Vigil Mass; Thursday 5:00 PM (with Rosary)
- Eucharistic adoration: First Friday after 8:30 AM Mass; First Saturday 8:00–9:00 AM

== See also ==
- Roman Catholic Archdiocese of Seattle
- Frances Xavier Cabrini
- John Bosco
- Lakewood, Washington
- Immaculate Conception Church, Steilacoom, Washington
- Partners in the Gospel
