= Terapon Adhahn =

Thai convicted sex offender

Terapon Dang Adhahn (born c.1965) is a Thai convicted sex offender and a former Bhikkhu who, in May 2008, was sentenced to life in prison for raping and murdering 12-year-old Zina Linnik in Tacoma, Washington.

Charges were filed against him involving the rape and abduction of 11-year-old Sabrina Rasmussen near Fort Lewis, Washington in 2000 and the repeated sexual assaults of a teenage acquaintance that spanned from 2000 to 2004.

== Early life and education ==
Adhahn was born in Bangkok, Thailand to Pennsiri Bower and a Thai father. As a child, Adhahn was allegedly raped repeatedly by an older sibling. It was also reported that his father physically abused him until his parents divorced around the time Adhahn was 3 or 4. After Adhahn's father left, his mother married an American serviceman named John Bower and the family moved to San Diego in 1977.

== Career ==
Following his high school graduation, Adhahn took part in traditional Buddhist ceremonies and became a Buddhist monk.

He later became a legal United States resident and enlisted in the United States Army. Adhahn married Barbara Harris in 1986 and had two children. In his two tours of duty, Adhahn would serve at Fort Dix in New Jersey, Germany, and Fort Lewis. His wife went with him. In 1989, he moved to Western Washington and settled in Tacoma. Investigators believe he may have visited the area prior to his move. Adhahn separated from his wife in September 1990 and filed for divorce in May 1998. Around this time Adhahn was living with another woman who gave birth to a son. For a time, he lived with his aunt in Fort Worth, Texas.

== Criminal history ==
=== Rape and incest conviction ===
In 1990, Adhahn was convicted of rape and incest against his half sister when she was 16. Following the conviction, Adhahn served two months in jail and attended court ordered treatment for five years. He was classified as a level one ("low risk") sex offender and required to register as a sex offender. Adhahn did not face deportation due to his status as a legal resident with federal law dictating that it was not a requirement for first-time offenders. In 1992, he was convicted of intimidation with a weapon in Tacoma, but officials at the Immigration and Naturalization Service (INS) were not aware of this second conviction and Adhahn was allowed to stay in the country.

=== Zina Linnik ===
Zina Linnik was abducted from behind her home in the Hilltop Neighborhood of Tacoma during a 2007 Fourth of July celebration. Her father heard a scream and ran to the back to find one of Zina's flip-flop shoes on the ground and a gray van leaving. He was able to make out a partial on the van's license plate which was traced back to Adhahn. Through his lawyer, Adhahn told police where they could find the Tacoma girl's body, though he reportedly did not confess to her abduction or murder. On July 20, Pierce County prosecutors said they planned to charge Adhahn in Zina's case with aggravated murder, which, at the time, carried a maximum penalty of death in Washington state. However, because Pierce County prosecutors agreed not to seek the death penalty if Adhahn would cooperate with police and help find Linnik's body, Adhahn faced a maximum penalty of life in prison.

After his 2007 arrest, Adhahn was also a person of interest in the murder of Adre-Anna Jackson, and his former home was searched for evidence that same year.

In April 2008, Adhahn pleaded guilty to raping and murdering Linnik.

=== Amber Hagerman ===
Following the discovery of Zina Linnik's body, Adhahn's name and profile was submitted to the Arlington police department in connection with the 1996 abduction and slaying of Amber Hagerman. Adhahn's mother and brother lived near the Fort Worth area at the time of Amber's death though no evidence has been found that places him in the area during this time. During this time period that Amber went missing, Adhahn was required to attend mandatory sex offender therapy sessions on a weekly basis in Tacoma, Washington. Tacoma police contacted the Arlington department when similarities appeared between Amber's case and a 2000 Fort Lewis rape and abduction that Adhahn was charged with.

== Status ==
Adhahn made national and international headlines for unfounded rumors (as he was not in Texas when Amber was abducted) that he was the abductor and murderer of Amber alert namesake Amber Hagerman. As of March 2021, he is housed in the Washington State Penitentiary in Walla Walla, Washington doing time for Linnik's murder. His inmate number is 968071.
