= Penn Square Bank =

Oklahoma bank that went bankrupt after making energy-related loans

- Type: Bank
- Industry: Financial services
- Founded: 1960
- Defunct: 1982
- Fate: Bankrupt after making energy-related loans
- Headquarters: Oklahoma City, Oklahoma, United States
- Area served: Oklahoma
- Key people: Bill Patterson (energy-lending chief that was convicted)
- Products: Loans for oil extraction, banking services
- Owner: The Rooney family

Penn Square Bank was a small American commercial bank located in Oklahoma City, Oklahoma. The bank made a large number of poorly underwritten energy-related loans that it sold to other banks. Losses on these loans led to significant financial problems in these banks. Penn Square Bank declared bankruptcy in July 1982.

== History ==
The bank was founded in 1960 and was located in the rear of the Penn Square Mall in Oklahoma City. The bank made its name in high-risk energy loans during the late 1970s and early 1980s Oklahoma and Texas oil boom. Between 1974 and 1982, the bank's assets increased more than 15 times to $525 million and its deposits swelled from $29 million to more than $450 million. As a result primarily of irresponsible lending practices in connection with the sale of over $1 billion in "loan participations" to other banks throughout America, Penn Square Bank failed in July 1982. Unlike most previous bank failures since the Federal Deposit Insurance Corporation (FDIC) was formed, the uninsured depositors suffered losses as no other bank was willing to assume the deposits. As most of the deposits came from other financial institutions and represented high interest-rate jumbo certificates of deposit that were largely uninsured, this represented a major loss for the depositors. The investigation by the FDIC after the bank failure uncovered 451 possible criminal violations.

The bank is often cited as being partly responsible for the collapse of Continental Illinois National Bank and Trust Company of Chicago, which had to write off $326 million in loans purchased from Penn Square. In addition, there were major losses at other banks, including Seattle First National Bank, Michigan National Bank, and Chase Manhattan Bank in New York. The bank's collapse coincided with the 1980s oil glut and Penn Square was the first of 139 Oklahoma banks that failed in the 1980s. The insolvency was the subject of two best-selling books and led to a two-year prison term for the bank's energy-lending chief, Bill Patterson.

== Penn Square alumni ==
- Bill P. (Beep) Jennings (b. 1923, d. 2003)
- William G. "Bill" Patterson
- Laurence Francis Rooney Jr. (b. 1925, d. 1980)
- Richard C. Haugland
- William Eugene Rowsey III
