= Pierce College (Washington) =

Community college district in Washington, U.S.

Coordinates: 47.172°N 122.571°W

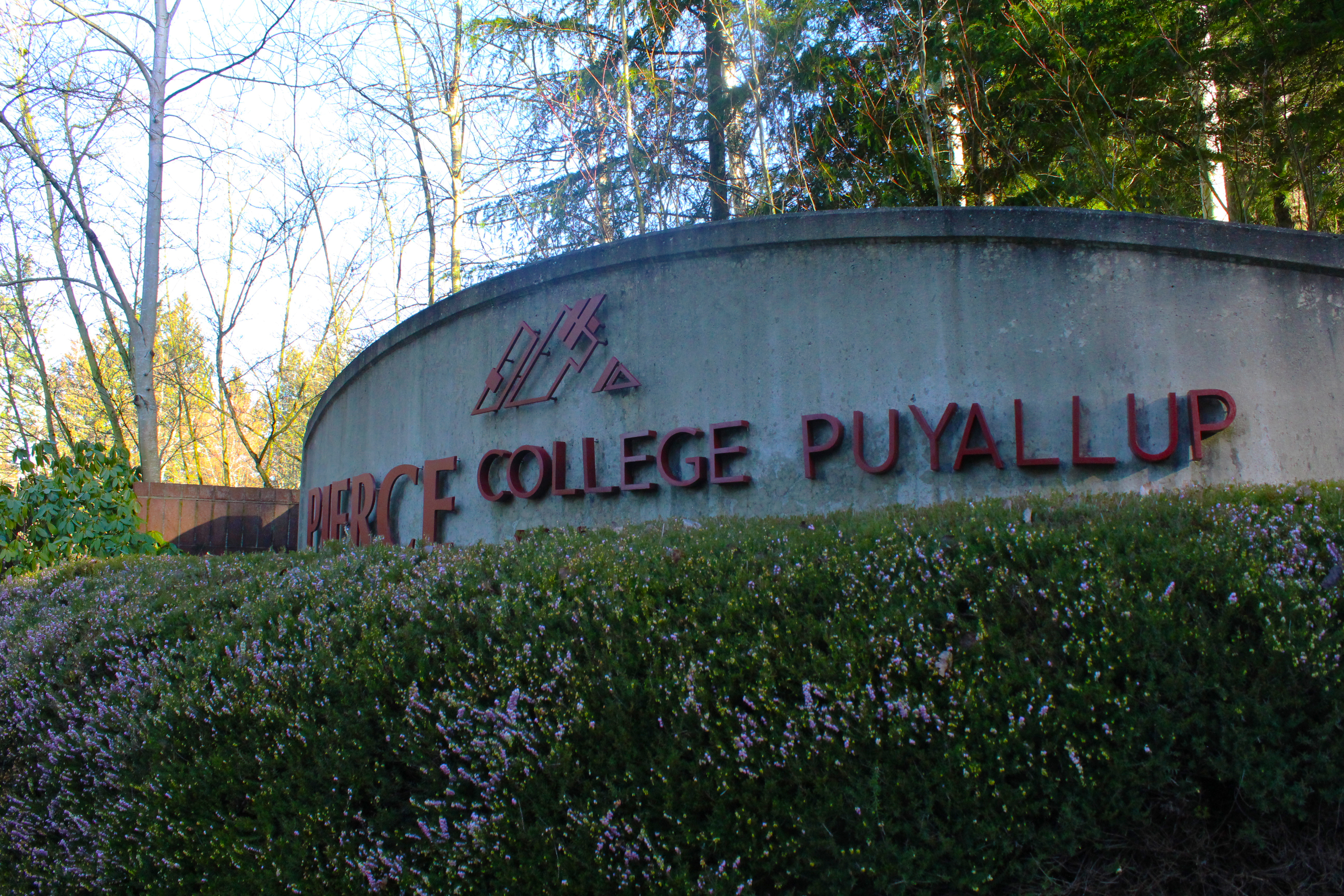
- Entrance sign at Pierce College Puyallup
- Other name: Pierce College District 11
- Former names: Clover Park Community College (1967–1970); Fort Steilacoom Community College (1970–1986)
- Type: Public community college district
- Established: 1967
- Accreditation: Northwest Commission on Colleges and Universities
- Affiliations: Washington State Board for Community and Technical Colleges
- Chancellor: Julie A. White
- President: Matthew A. Campbell (Fort Steilacoom); Chio Flores (Puyallup)
- Location: Lakewood, Washington; Puyallup, Washington
- Nickname: Raiders
- Sporting affiliations: Northwest Athletic Conference
- Website: www.pierce.ctc.edu
- Fort Steilacoom campus

Pierce College is a public community college system in Pierce County, Washington, United States. It comprises two primary colleges, Pierce College Fort Steilacoom in Lakewood and Pierce College Puyallup in Puyallup, and two additional learning centers. The colleges are operated by the Pierce College District, which is overseen by the Washington State Board for Community and Technical Colleges (SBCTC). The district is led by chancellor Julie A. White; the two colleges also have their own president.

== Administration ==
The Washington State Board for Community and Technical Colleges oversees the colleges, who together make up the state's college district 11. Alongside the college districts in Seattle and Spokane, the Pierce College District is one of three districts containing more than one community or technical college. The chancellor and chief executive officer of the college district is Julie A. White, PhD, who began her term in 2023. The president of Pierce College Fort Steilacoom is, as of 2026, Matthew A. Campbell, EdD, while the president of the Puyallup location is Maria del Rosario "Chio" Flores, PhD.

== History ==
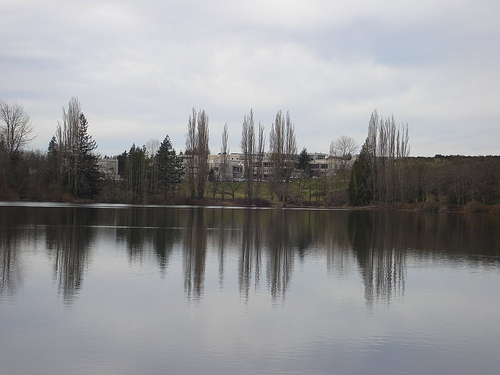
Fort Steilacoom campus in 2006

Pierce College was established in 1967, as Clover Park Community College. Marion Oppelt, PhD, served as its first president. Students attended classes in a converted Albertsons grocery store building, as well as at various locations at military bases and high schools. In 1970, after establishing a permanent. 140-acre (57 ha) campus near Fort Steilacoom, the college renamed itself to Fort Steilacoom Community College.

In 1986, the college expanded to a second location in Puyallup and was renamed Pierce College. The Puyallup campus opened in the fall of 1990 with only one building, the Gaspard Education Center. The campus expanded in 1996 with the opening of the Brouillet Library Science Center.

Pierce College was recognized by the State Board for Community and Technical Colleges as Washington's 34th community college in 1999. The Puyallup campus expanded again in 2004 with the College Center building, in 2008 with the Health Education Center Puyallup, and in 2010 with the Arts and Allied Health Building.

== Academics ==
The district enrolls over 13,500 students, with a student-to-faculty ratio of 20∶1. Pierce College offers eight associate degrees and six Bachelor of Applied Science degrees in over 100 courses of study, including accounting, anthropology, computer science, criminal justice, geography, and writing. Classes are held on the quarter system and the college is accredited by the Northwest Commission on Colleges and Universities.

Pierce College also offers Running Start – whereby high school students can earn college credits towards an associate degree – and classes in English as a second language as well as GED programs. The college was ranked the number one community college for veterans by the Military Times in 2021.

== Student life ==
The two campuses are approximately 20 miles apart. The Puyallup location has a larger student population.

=== Athletics ===
The Pierce College Raiders athletics program fields six women's teams, three men's teams, and a cheer squad in the Northwest Athletic Conference – West Region. The men's teams are baseball, basketball, and soccer, while the women's teams are basketball, cross country, soccer, softball, track and field, and volleyball.

=== Publications ===
The student newspaper of Pierce College Puyallup was The Puyallup Post, published monthly. The Post was founded in 1994 and was originally called "The Puyallup Campus Post" when it was an insert in The Pioneer, the student newspaper on the Fort Steilacoom campus. The Post closed during the COVID-19 pandemic, but was reincarnated as The Pinnacle in 2024. Other publications include SLAM, a "student literary and arts magazine" at the college. It is published annually and features student writing and multimedia works.

== Notable alumni ==
- Oscar Hilman
- Steve Hofbauer, mayor of Palmdale, California
- Megan Jendrick, Olympic gold medalist swimmer and author
- Demetrious Johnson, professional mixed martial artist, first UFC Flyweight Champion
- Joyce McDonald (attended 1980, 1997), politician
