= Seafirst Bank =

Defunct American bank

Seafirst Corporation
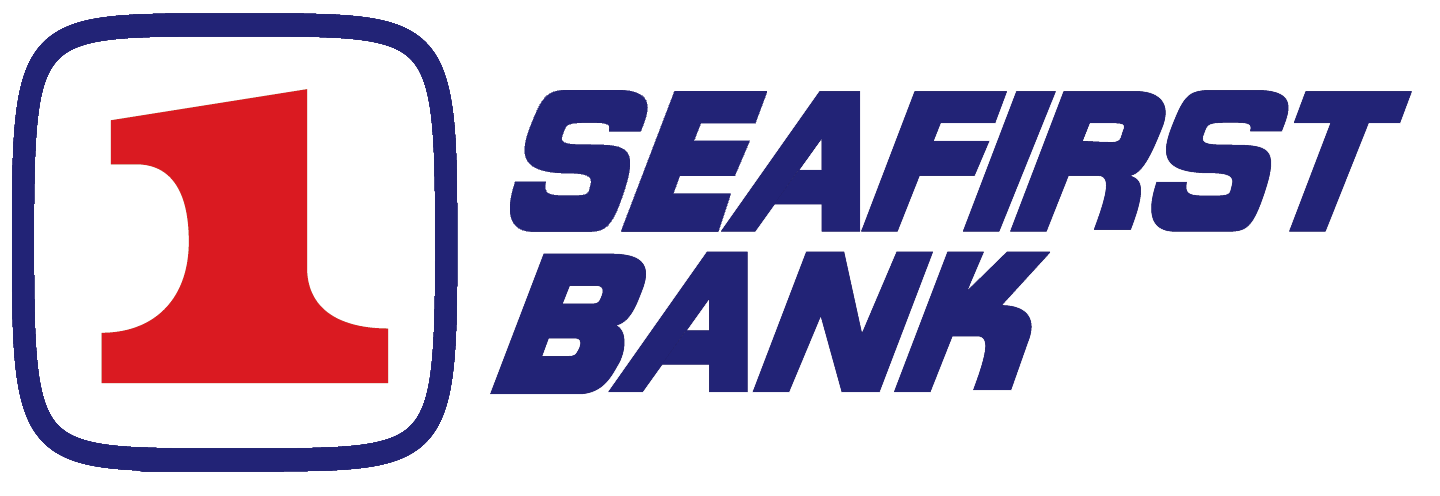
- Trade name: Seafirst Bank
- Company type: Public (1974–1983); Subsidiary (1983–1999)
- Traded as: NYSE: SFC
- Industry: Banking
- Founded: November 11, 1929; 96 years ago in Seattle, Washington (as First Seattle Dexter Horton National Bank); July 1, 1977; 48 years ago (as Seafirst Corporation)
- Defunct: September 27, 1999; 26 years ago
- Fate: Merged into Bank of America
- Successor: Bank of America
- Headquarters: Seattle, Washington
- Area served: Washington
- Parent: BankAmerica (1983–1999)
- Subsidiaries: Seattle-First National Bank

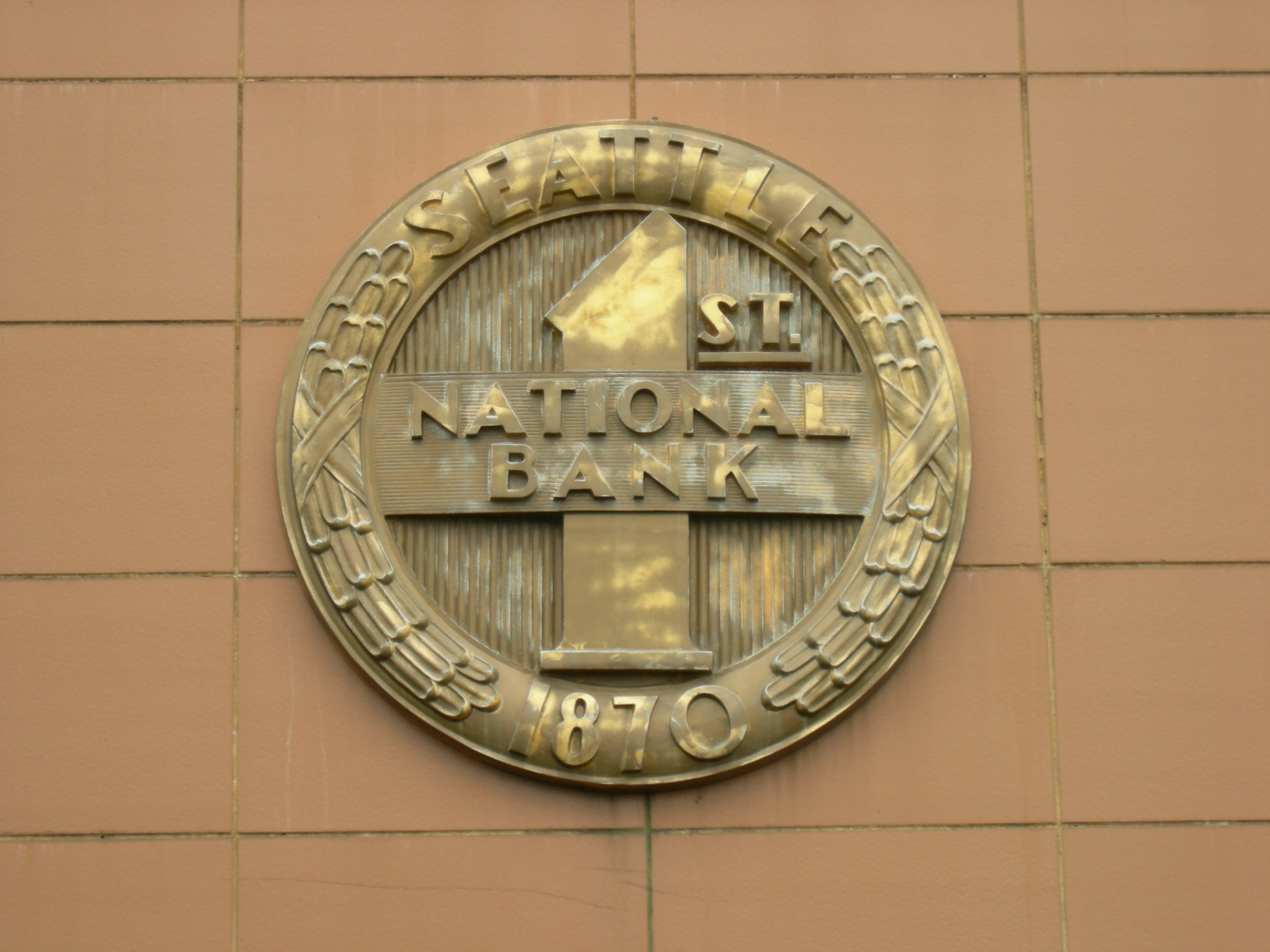

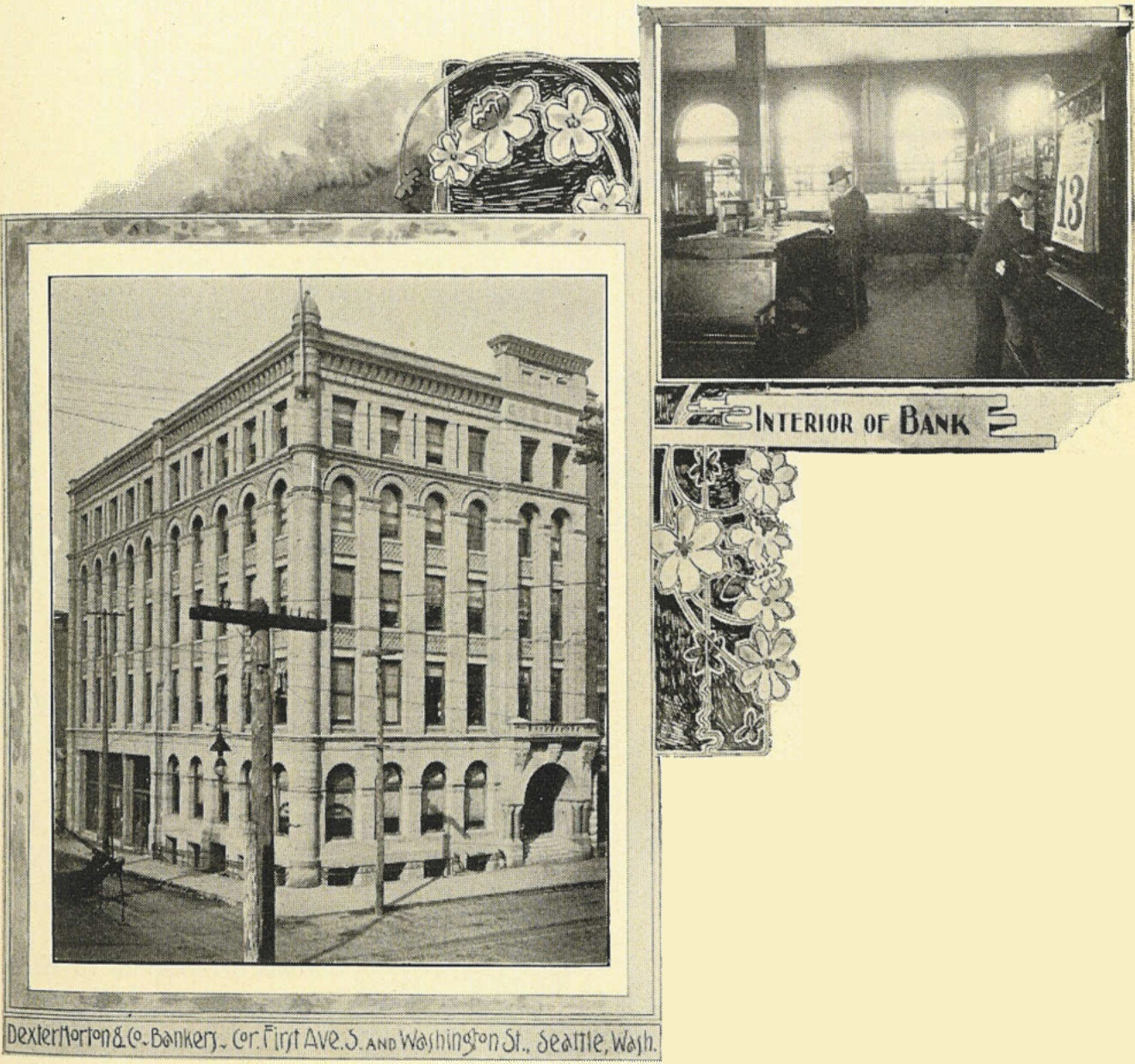
The Bank of Dexter Horton & Co., First South and Washington in Seattle's Pioneer Square neighborhood, 1900. As of 2009 the building is still in use as the Maynard Building.

Seafirst Corporation was an American bank holding company based in Seattle, Washington. Its banking subsidiary, Seafirst Bank, was the largest bank in Washington, with 235 branches and 497 ATMs across the state.

Formed in 1929 via the merger of Seattle's three largest banks, Seafirst was acquired in 1983 by BankAmerica after posting huge losses from loans it purchased from the failed Penn Square Bank; the Seafirst brand was retired in 1999 after NationsBank acquired BankAmerica the previous year and subsequently implemented the Bank of America brand nationwide.

== History ==
Seafirst Corporation was formed on November 11, 1929, from the merger of Seattle's three largest banks, the First National Bank Group (founded 1882), the Dexter Horton National Bank (founded 1870 by Dexter Horton), and Seattle National Bank (founded 1889), the bank was originally named First Seattle Dexter Horton National Bank. In 1931, the bank changed its name to First National Bank of Seattle, and again in 1935 to Seattle-First National Bank.

In 1944, the bank won a case before the US Supreme Court, United States v. Seattle-First Nat. Bank, by arguing that it did not have to pay a transfer tax when it converted from a state to a federally chartered bank. In 1970 it was using the name Firstbank. Seafirst Corporation was formed as a bank holding company for the Seattle-First National Bank on July 1, 1974.

=== 1983 merger ===
In April 1983, San Francisco–based BankAmerica Corporation announced the pending acquisition of the ailing Seafirst Corporation for $400 million in cash and stock, when Seafirst was at risk of seizure by the federal government after becoming insolvent following the demise of Oklahoma City–based Penn Square Bank. Seafirst had acquired a significant share of Penn Square's energy loan debt by participating in loans originated by that bank. Penn Square Bank collapsed in 1982, and the FDIC's decision to pay off only insured deposits rendered the participation assets valueless.

The acquisition was completed in July 1983. In September 1983, the bank began to use the Seafirst Bank brand for advertising purposes while still keeping Seattle-First National Bank as the legal name for the bank. For the next quarter-century, Seafirst Bank maintained a high degree of autonomy and reigned as the largest bank in Washington.

On February 10, 1997, $4.4 million was stolen from the Seafirst branch of Lakewood by the Trenchcoat Robbers.

Following the 1998 merger of BankAmerica Corp. and NationsBank Corp. into the modern Bank of America Corporation, Seafirst finally assumed the Bank of America brand on September 27, 1999.

== See also ==
- Columbia Seafirst Center, corporate headquarters (1985–1999)
- Seafirst Building, corporate headquarters (1969–1985)
