= Silcox Island =

Island

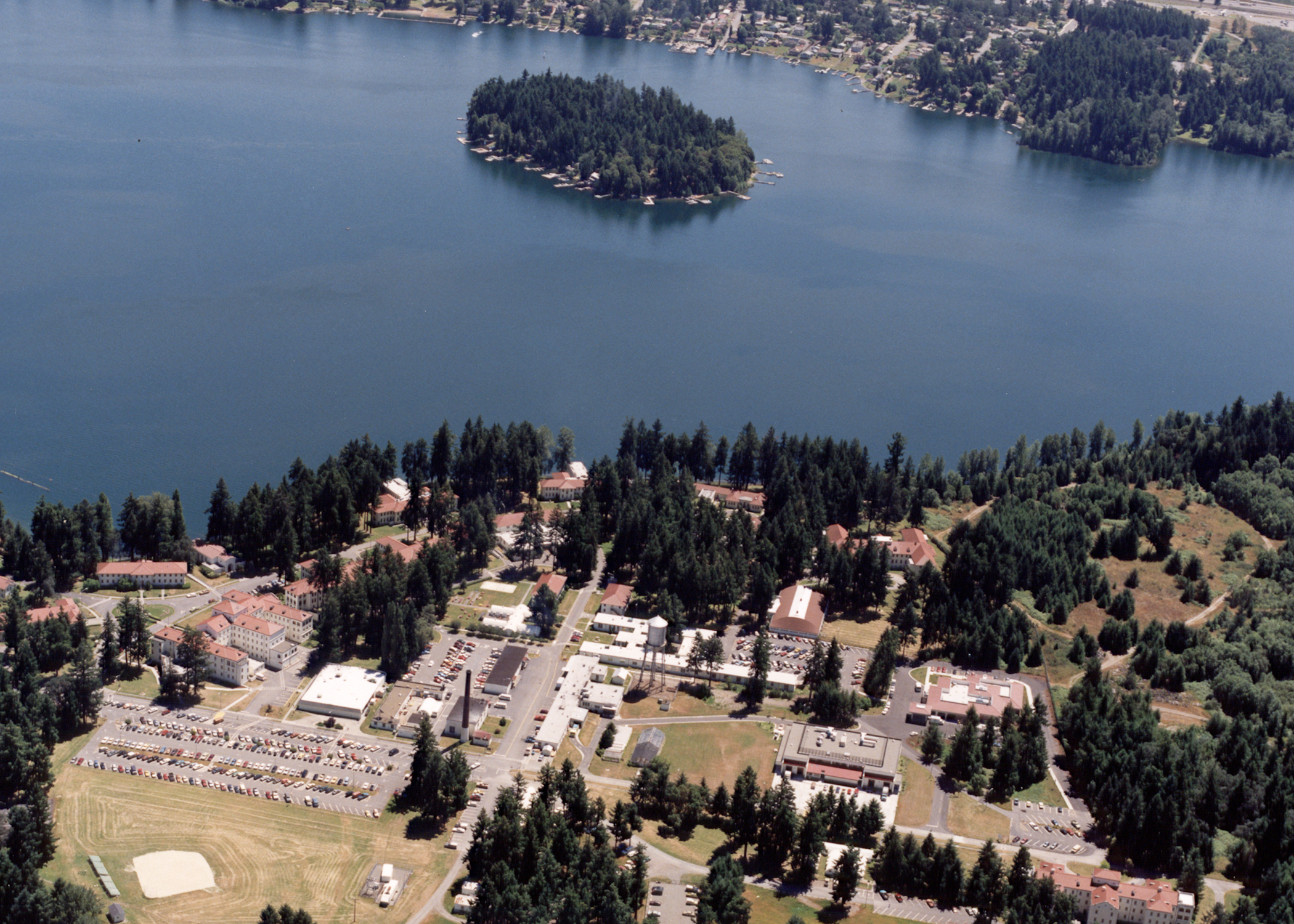
- Silcox Island in American Lake

- Location within Washington (state)

Geography
- Location: Lakewood, Washington
- Coordinates: 47°07′44″N 122°33′53″W
- Adjacent to: American Lake

Administration
- United States of America
- State: Washington
- County: Pierce

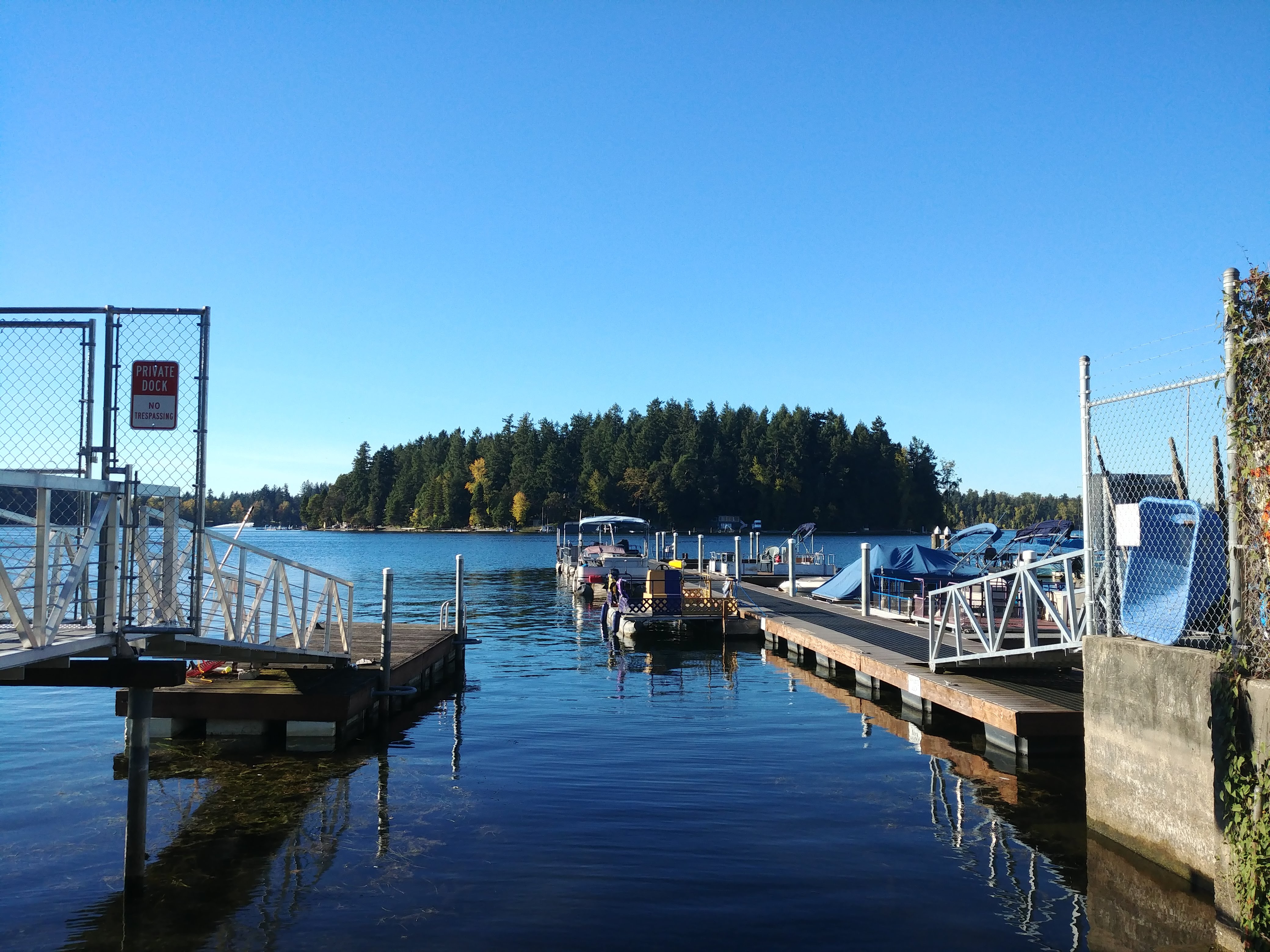
Silcox Island seen from shore of American Lake

Silcox Island is an inhabited island in American Lake in Pierce County, Washington. It is in the city of Lakewood, Washington. Although the island has had homes built on it, it is still mostly forested.

== History ==
Silcox Island is named for Albert Silcox, who originally acquired the land. Although at first he and his family were the sole inhabitants, financial needs led him to sell to friends, beginning with George Sells and Sells' son-in-law, Earl Trowbridge. Over time, more and more lots were established and sold.

Until 1968, there was no electric or telephone service to the island. After a cable was run from near Bill's Boathouse, most residents had their homes electrified. Although a few homes were connected to septic tanks, many used outhouses well into the 1980s.

== Climate ==
The Köppen climate classification is warm-summer Mediterranean climate (Csb). The average temperature is 9 °C (48 °F). The warmest month is July at average 20 °C (68 °F), and the coolest is December at −1 °C (30 °F). Annual precipitation is 1,498 millimeters (59.0 in). The wettest month is March, with 203 millimeters (8.0 in), and the driest is July, with 25 millimeters (0.98 in).

Silcox Island

Climate chart (precipitation, max. and min. temperature)
J	F	M	A	M	J	J	A	S	O	N	D
146 4 −2	163 6 −3	203 7 −1	135 12 2	104 17 7	66 21 10	25 26 14	31 25 12	115 21 9	153 14 5	181 7 −1	177 1 −3
- █ Average max. and min. temperatures in °C
- █ Precipitation totals in mm
Imperial conversion
J	F	M	A	M	J	J	A	S	O	N	D
5.7 39 28	6.4 43 27	8 45 30	5.3 54 36	4.1 63 45	2.6 70 50	1 79 57	1.2 77 54	4.5 70 48	6 57 41	7.1 45 30	7 34 27
- █ Average max. and min. temperatures in °F
- █ Precipitation totals in inches
