= Seafirst Bank robbery =

1997 bank heist in Lakewood, Washington, U.S.

Coordinates: 47°15′10″N 122°26′20″W

- Date: February 10, 1997
- Location: Seafirst Bank in Lakewood, Washington, U.S.
- Perpetrator: Trenchcoat Robbers
- Outcome: Cash robbery of $4,461,681

On February 10, 1997, the Seafirst Bank branch of Lakewood, Washington, was robbed of $4,461,681 in cash by Billy Kirkpatrick and Ray Bowman, also known as the Trenchcoat Robbers. An investigation by the Federal Bureau of Investigation and the Internal Revenue Service caught the two, and they were both sent to 15 years in prison in 1999. It stands as one of the largest robberies in U.S. history.

== Background ==
Billy Kirkpatrick, from Hovland, Minnesota, and Ray Bowman, from Kansas City, Missouri, were two criminals from the Midwest known as the Trenchcoat Robbers, who performed robberies across the United States from the 1970s to the 1990s. In the 1970s, they stole disco records from record stores, and then in the 1980s they started robbing banks at gunpoint. From then until February 1997, they stole $3.5 million in 26 heists across the country. Because they wore trench coats during their robberies, the two were named the Trenchcoat Robbers by the Federal Bureau of Investigation, who had very little information on the culprits. In 1997, Kirkpatrick was 57 and Bowman was 53.

Starting in January 1997, the two staked out the Seafirst Bank branch of Lakewood, Washington. The bank was a repository for other banks, businesses, and a casino, and at the close of business, the cash was stored in the bank's main vault. They stayed at a hotel in Kent, and took time to blend in with the locals, eating at high-end restaurants and attending a piano recital at the University of Washington. They cased the bank, finding out the vault was "packed with an extraordinary amount of cash" to cover an upcoming payday of soldiers at Fort Lewis, and devised a getaway route. The two stole a Jeep Cherokee using a set of manufacturer's master keys that Kirkpatrick had bought in the mail after posing as a locksmith.

== Robbery ==
At 6:30 p.m. on February 10, Kirkpatrick and Bowman approached the bank, wearing trench coats, sunglasses, and FBI caps. Kirkpatrick was wearing an earpiece connected to a police scanner in his coat pocket. Using a small L-shaped prying tool, they unlocked the bank door, and entered with their guns drawn. Three women who were working there were storing their cash for the night. They ordered the three women into the vault, and secured their wrist with plastic electrical ties. The two told the employees they didn't intend to use violence. Then they started stuffing the vault's bundled cash into duffel bags. Before leaving, they tied the women's ankles to a table. The duffel bags were driven out the front door on a metal cart, and loaded into the back of their Jeep Cherokee. The robbery was completed within minutes. It is one of the biggest robberies in U.S. history, with $4,461,681 stolen. The amount of cash weighed about 335 pounds (152 kg). As soon as the two drove away, one of the women freed herself and set off the alarm.

== Aftermath ==
The FBI immediately suspected the Trenchcoat Robbers. A special FBI task force, "Trenchrob", was convened shortly after. Agents went to every hotel on the Interstate 5 corridor, and stopped people in traffic to ask them if they noticed anything suspicious happening near the bank. A week later, they found a getaway car, but it was clean of identifiable information like fingerprints.

Kirkpatrick and Bowman had spent the night after the heist in a hotel in Portland, Oregon, and then split up, with each person taking half of the money. Kirkpatrick went to a Holiday Inn in Eagan, Minnesota, to be with his girlfriend, Myra J. Penney. He had brought "four or five" duffel bags. Bowman visited safe deposit boxes in Colorado, Iowa, Missouri, Nebraska, and Utah. After the trips, he put the rest of the money in three safe deposit boxes in Kansas City, in Kirkpatrick's newly built custom log home in the northern Minnesota woods, and $338,000 was given to Bowman's friend in a trunk. In May, Kansas City police witnessed Bowman uncovering a weapons cache.

Kirkpatrick paid $174,000 in cash for the Minnesota home. The details of the house were argued between Bowman and the builder, Michael Senty. Senty reported the cash payments to the IRS, which was a starting point for the new law enforcement investigation. In August, IRS agent Billy Waters served a subpoena for Penney. It led to agents finding $1.8 million in Bowman's car trunk, and he was arrested in October.

On November 3, Kirkpatrick and Penney rented a hotel room in Eagan, planning to stay until November 14. However, on November 9, Kirkpatrick flew to Las Vegas and put all his cash in the trunk of a rented car. On November 10, on his way back to Minnesota, he was stopped by a Nebraska state trooper, Chris Bigsby, for driving seven miles per hour over the speed limit. Bigsby used a drug-sniffing dog for a search, and after the dog found nothing, he searched the trunk. He found 4 guns, locksmith tools, masks, fake police badges, and $2 million in a set of foot lockers. Some of it was traceable to the Seafirst Bank. A judge later found the warrantless search illegal, forcing prosecutors to drop weapons charges against Kirkpatrick. By that time, Myra Penney, had driven to Lincoln, Nebraska, with $100,000 in cash to bail Kirkpatrick out of jail. Penney's cash also contained markings from Seafirst. Facing 20 years in prison, Penney cooperated with the FBI, and gave up the name of Kirkpatrick's partner, "Ray", who was in Kansas City. It was discovered Kansas City police were watching Bowman in May. On November 14, Kirkpatrick's Hovland home and hotel room in Eagan were raided.

Police and federal agents raided Bowman's house in December, where they found "$97,000 [in] cash, key-making and lock-picking equipment, and a small armory of guns and ammunition". Authorities searched a dozen safe deposit boxes around the Midwest, and found $1.5 million in cash. Bowman's brother then handed the authorities two locked briefcases containing a total of $480,000.

In early 1998, a federal grand jury indicted Kirkpatrick and Bowman for robbing banks nationwide. In March 1999, the two were sentenced to 15 years in prison; Kirkpatrick pled guilty to the robberies, and Bowman was found guilty in a trial.

== See also ==
- List of bank robbers and robberies
