= Gravelly Lake =

Lake in Washington, United States

- Location within Washington (state) Location within the United States
- Location: Lakewood, Pierce County, Washington, United States
- Coordinates: 47.1470°N 122.5313°W
- Primary inflows: groundwater
- Primary outflows: seepage
- Basin countries: United States
- Surface area: 160 acres (65 ha)
- Average depth: 38 ft (12 m)
- Max. depth: 57 ft (17 m)
- Water volume: 264,800,000 cu yd (202,500,000 m^{3})
- Shore length^{1}: 2.1 mi (3.4 km)
- Surface elevation: 220 ft (67 m)
- ^{1} Shore length is not a well-defined measure.

Gravelly Lake is a lake located in Lakewood in Pierce County, Washington, United States. The lake is fed by groundwater and has no surface drainage channels.

The lake is surrounded by higher-priced homes and estates. Out of the three main lakes in Lakewood, Gravelly Lake is the most prestigious and expensive. Called Cook‑al‑chy (pond lily) by the native people, the lake was named Gravelly Lake due to the gravel-covered lake bed.

The lake has two legal public access points, both of which are overgrown and are not viable for access.
