= Steve Hofbauer =

American fire inspector and politician from California

Steven D. "Steve" Hofbauer

Mayor of Palmdale, California
- Incumbent
- Assumed office December 2018
- Preceded by: Jim Ledford

Personal details
- Party: Republican
- Spouse: Barbara Hofbauer
- Children: 2
- Occupation: Senior Fire Inspector, politician

Steven D. "Steve" Hofbauer is an American politician and former senior Fire Inspector from California. Hofbauer was the last directly elected mayor of Palmdale, California before the city changed its process to a rotating system.

== Education ==
Hofbauer attended Pierce College, Los Angeles Valley College, UCLA Extension, California State University, Los Angeles, and other colleges.

== Career ==
Since 1980, Hofbauer started his paramedic career with Los Angeles Fire Department. Hofbauer is a former senior Fire Inspector, licensed EMT, and paramedic. He served multiple tours of duty as a Medical Team Leader with the L.A. County Disaster Medical Assistance Team. He received highly specialized training as a member of the elite National Medical Response Team, a unit of the US Public Health Service, trained to treat victims of industrial, nuclear or chemical accidents, or terrorist acts involving Weapons of Mass Destruction.

In 1990, he became a Palmdale Planning Commissioner. In 2003, Hofbauer became a member of the city council for Palmdale, California. On November 6, 2018, he was elected mayor of Palmdale, defeating Jim Ledford and V. Jesse Smith with 44.3% of the votes. A Republican, he was sworn in as mayor on December 11, 2018.

== Awards ==
- 1994 Los Angeles Community Protector award.
- 2018 Certificate of Valor. Presented by Los Angeles County Fire Department.

== Personal life ==
Hofbauer and his wife Barbara have two children. Hofbauer and his family live in Palmdale.

In July 2022, Hofbauer was hospitalized at Cedars-Sinai Medical Center in Los Angeles Thursday to undergo tests for an auto-immune disorder, after spending two days at Antelope Valley Hospital.
