= Maynard Building =

Office building in Seattle, WA

Coordinates: 47°36′04″N 122°20′04″W

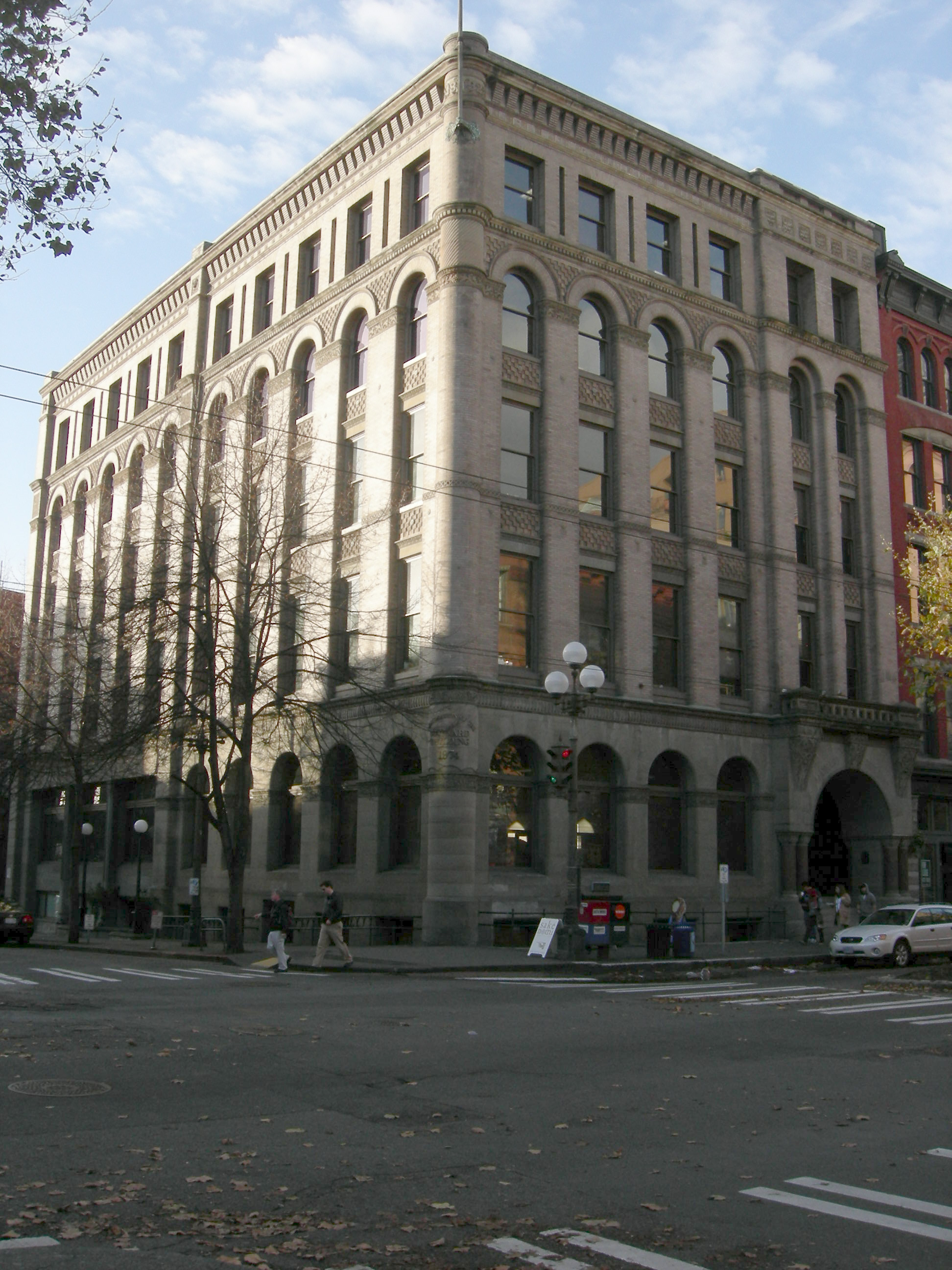
The building's exterior in 2007

The Maynard Building is a five-story office building in Seattle, Washington, United States. Constructed in 1892 on a Romanesque Revival design by Albert Wickersham, the masonry building was originally known as the Dexter Horton Building and housed Dexter Horton's nascent banking business, which eventually grew into Seafirst Bank. Located at 119 First Avenue South in the city's Pioneer Square neighborhood, the building took its current name in honor of Doc Maynard. The Maynard Building underwent a major refurbishment between 1974 and 1975.

The Maynard Building was constructed on the site of a previous building also known as the Dexter Horton Building. During the Seattle riot of 1886 Governor Watson Squire's martial law decree was read from the steps of that building to "yells and howls of defiance" from the assembled mob.
