= Immaculate Conception Catholic Church (Steilacoom, Washington) =

Historic church in Washington, United States

- Steilacoom Catholic Church
- U.S. National Register of Historic Places
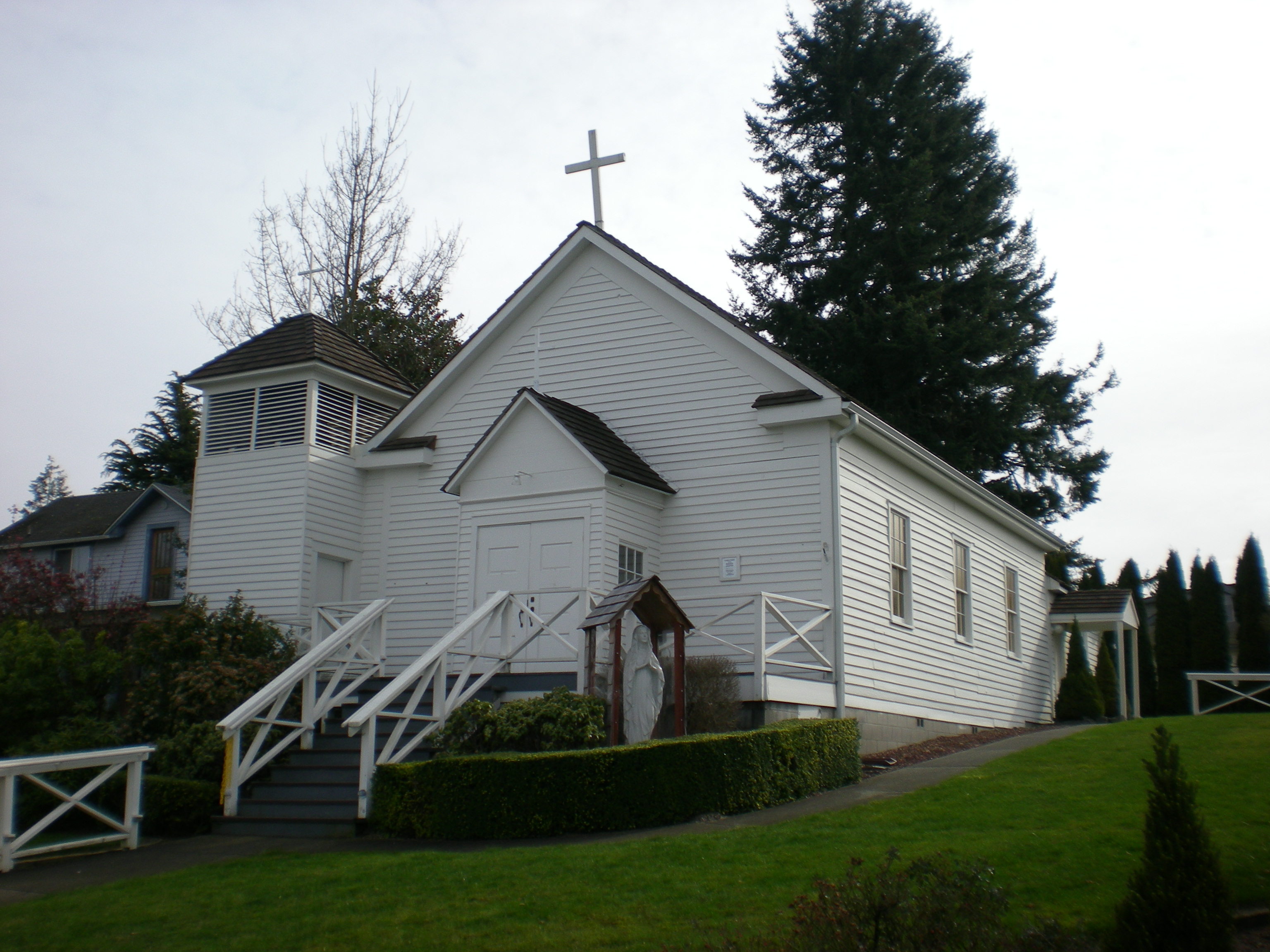
- Image of the church, c. 2008

- Location within Washington (state)
- Location: Steilacoom, Washington
- Coordinates: 47°10′16.3″N 122°35′36.91″W
- Built: 1855
- NRHP reference No.: 74001972
- Added to NRHP: July 30, 1974

The Immaculate Conception Catholic Church (also known as the Church of the Immaculate Conception) is a Latin Catholic church in Steilacoom, Washington, United States. It was originally built in 1855 near Fort Steilacoom, but was moved to its present location in 1864. It was the first Catholic church built in Washington. It was a mission church.
The church was added to the National Register of Historic Places in 1974. The church is part of the Lakewood Catholic Parish Family, and is administered by St. John Bosco Catholic Parish.

== See also ==
- List of the oldest buildings in Washington (state)
- Lakewood Catholic Parish Family

== Sources ==
- Dunkelberger, Steve; Neary, Walter (2005). Lakewood. Charleston, SC: Arcadia. ISBN 0-7385-3045-X. OCLC 62790524.
- Roberts, George; Roberts, Jan (1999). Discover historic Washington State : a travel guide to hundreds of historical places in the Evergreen State. Baldwin Park, CA: Gem Guides Book Co. ISBN 1-889786-07-1. OCLC 42846701.
