= American Lake =

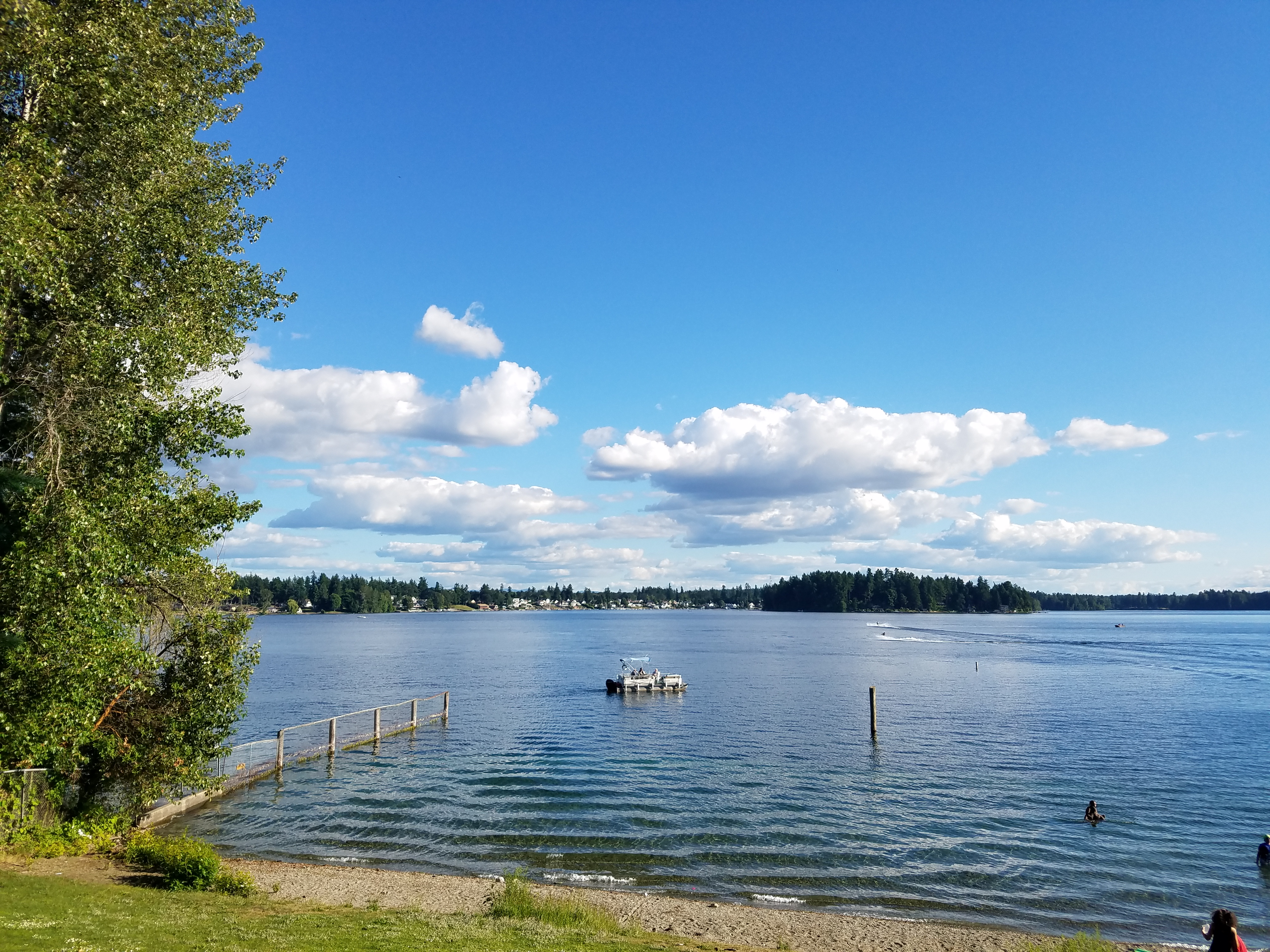
- American Lake seen from the north park

- Location within Washington (state) Location within the United States
- Location: Lakewood, Pierce County, Washington
- Coordinates: 47°07′48″N 122°34′01″W
- Type: Lake
- Primary inflows: Groundwater, Murray Creek
- Primary outflows: Sequalitchew Creek
- Catchment area: 25 sq mi (65 km^{2})
- Basin countries: United States
- Surface area: 1,091.3 acres (441.6 ha)
- Average depth: 53 ft (16 m)
- Max. depth: 90 ft (27 m)
- Surface elevation: 238 ft (73 m)

American Lake is a lake in Lakewood, Washington at Joint Base Lewis-McChord. It is the largest natural lake in Pierce County. There are two public parks on the large lake: American Lake North Park, and Harry Todd Park. Both have lakeside beaches for swimming, or picnicking. The first also features a boat launching area; the latter has tennis courts. There is a fishing dock located at Harry Todd Park. Fishing is a popular activity at American Lake, with cutthroat trout, largemouth bass, rainbow trout, rock bass, smallmouth bass, Sockeye salmon (kokanee) and yellow perch the most sought-after game fish. The Washington State Department of Fish and Wildlife regularly monitors the health of the fishery and stocks favored species regularly.

== Areas of interest ==
=== Summer's Cove ===
A small and mostly quiet area on the JBLM side where soldiers' families often swim on off duty days during the summer. It is located away from the fishing areas and near other areas of interest, including a nearby park and shore.

=== Russell Landing Marina and Launching Dock ===
A marina located near Summer's Cove that features a boat launch, a picnic area, and motor boat, kayak, and jet ski rentals. The marina is maintained by the United States Army's Family and MWR Programs.

== Islands ==
The lake contains or has contained these islands: Barlow Island, Beard Island, Cors Island, Short Island, and Silcox Island, which is inhabited. Barlow Island was acquired by the State of Washington for Camp Murray in 1931.
