= Lake Steilacoom =

- Location within Washington (state) Location within the United States
- Location: Lakewood, Pierce County, Washington
- Coordinates: 47°9′42″N 122°31′57″W
- Type: reservoir
- Primary inflows: Ponce de Leon Creek, Clover Creek
- Primary outflows: Chambers Creek
- Basin countries: United States
- Surface area: 306 acres (124 ha)
- Average depth: 11 ft (3.4 m)
- Max. depth: 20 ft (6.1 m)
- Surface elevation: 210 ft (64 m)
- Islands: 1

Lake Steilacoom is a reservoir approximately 4 km (2.5 mi) southwest of Tacoma in Pierce County, Washington, United States. Its boundaries lie entirely within the city of Lakewood, Washington. The reservoir covers approximately 306 acres (1,240,000 m^{2}), has a mean depth of 11 feet (3.4 m) and a maximum depth of 20 feet (6.1 m). Lake Steilacoom is a freshwater lake and drains into Puget Sound via Chambers Creek, which begins at its northern tip. The lake is fed at its southeastern end by two creeks: Ponce de Leon Creek, which originates in springs below what is now Lakewood Towne Center, as well as Clover Creek which flows from its source near Frederickson to the lake.

The reservoir was created in 1853 when Andrew Byrd built a dam across Chambers Creek, flooding what had previously been a small pond in a wetland. The dam was used for his sawmill (also built in 1853) and a grist mill (100 yards downstream, in 1857). A public boat launch can be found on the eastern shore in Edgewater Park. The Rhodesleigh mansion is located by the lake. The smaller pond was known as Lake Wyatchew prior to the dam's installation, and was briefly known later as Byrd's lake.

The Interlaaken Bridge was built in the 1920s over a narrow in the lake; it was closed in 2024 after "rapid deterioration" was discovered in the wood beams.

According to Nisqually tribe legend, the lake was possessed by an evil female monster known as Whe-atchee. Legends of the creature attacking people go back over a century.

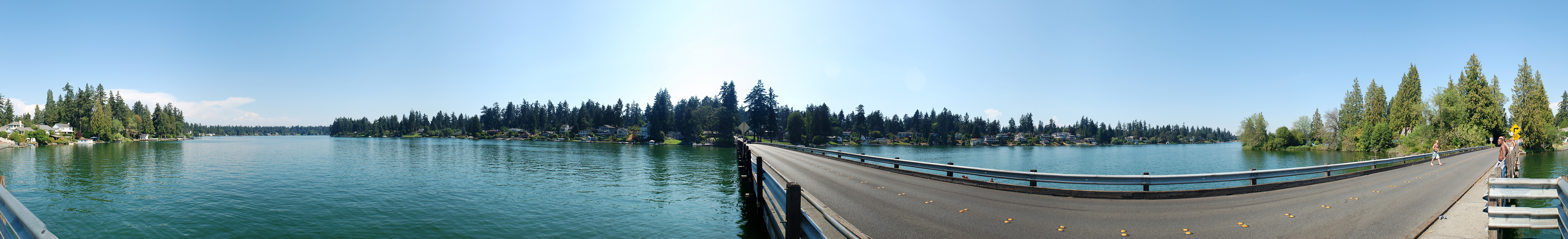
360° panorama of Lake Steilacoom as viewed from the Interlaaken Drive Bridge on a sunny July afternoon.

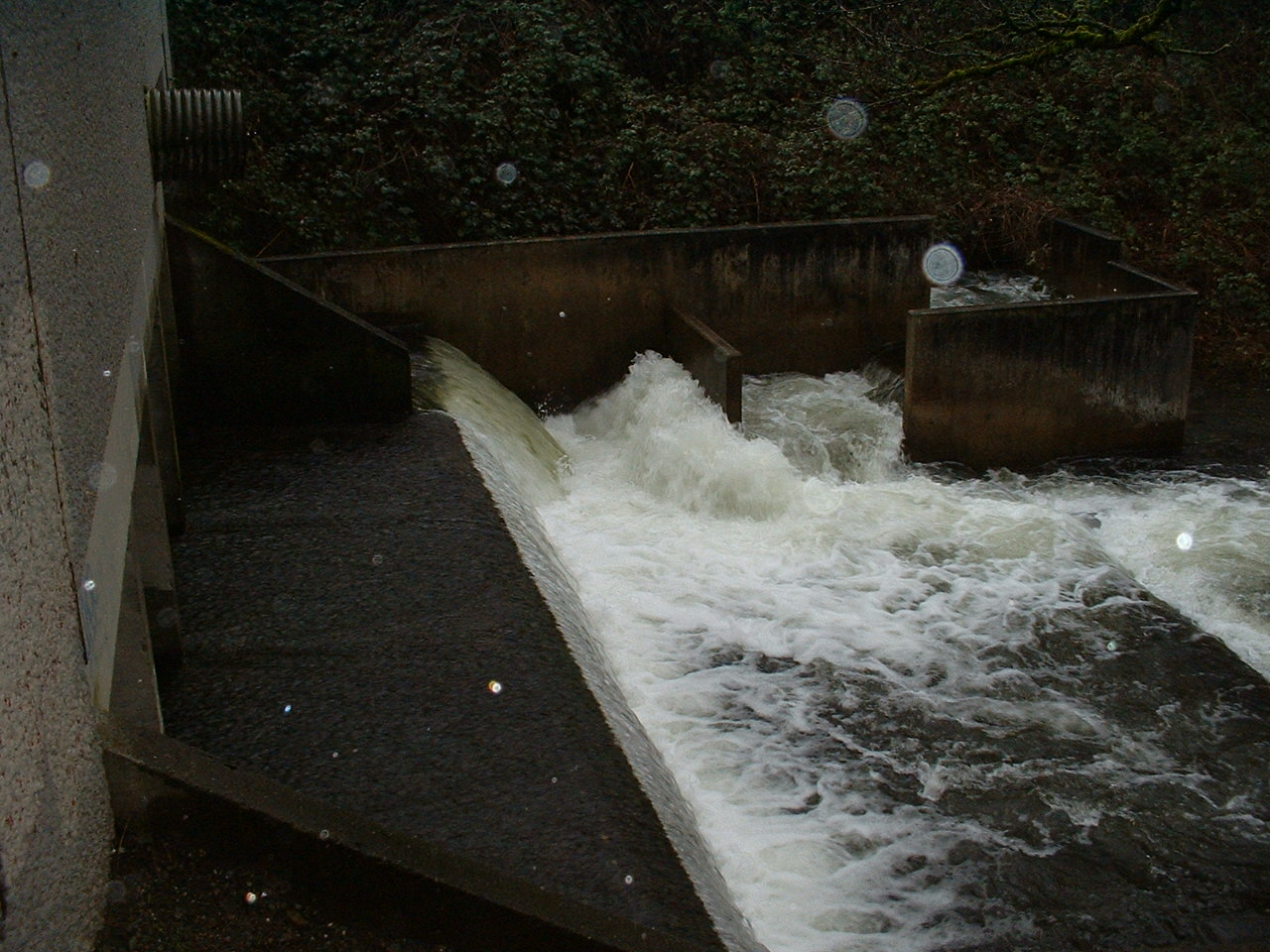
Lake Steilacoom Dam
