= Chambers Creek (Washington) =

Creek in Washington, United States

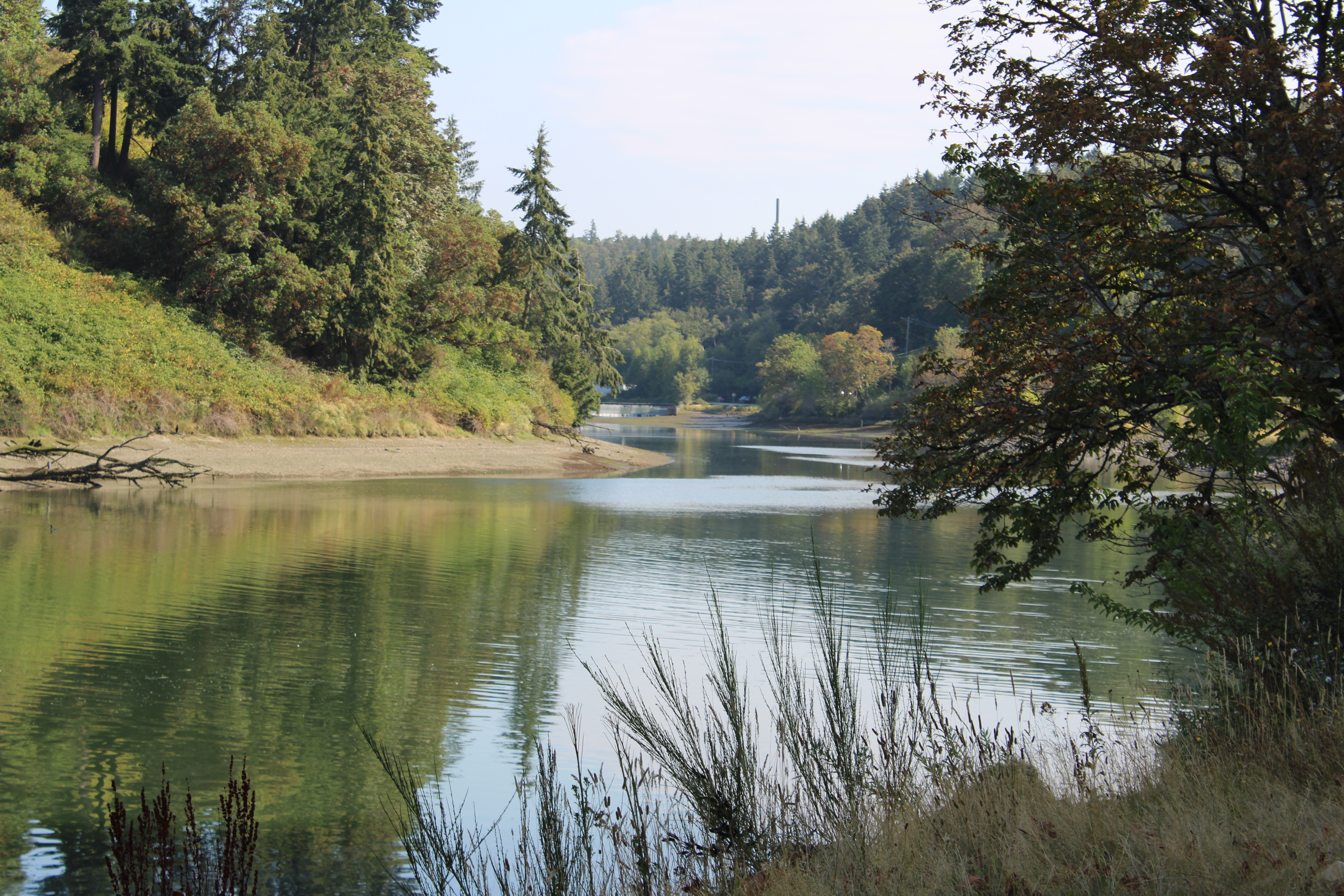

- Location of the mouth within Washington Chambers Creek (Washington) (the United States)

Location
- Country: United States
- State: Washington
- Counties: Pierce
- Cities: Lakewood, University Place, Steilacoom

Physical characteristics
- Source: Lake Steilacoom
- Mouth: Puget Sound
  - coordinates: 47°11′33″N 122°34′25″W

Chambers Creek is a creek in Washington. It is fed by Lake Steilacoom in Lakewood, Washington.

== Name ==
Chambers Creek was named for Thomas M. Chambers, who settled near Olympia, Washington, in 1846 and later built a sawmill on the creek.

The creek was also known as Steilacoom Creek, for the Coast Salish tribe whose territory on its north side.

== History ==
Abitibi Consolidated Inc. owned a paper mill along the south side of the lower reaches of the creek until 2010. The creek is dammed just upstream from the mill to provide water for the now-defunct mill, which began to be demolished in 2011 after the land was purchased by Tim Ralston.

Much of the lower reaches of Chambers Creek is part of the Chambers Creek Properties, a series of recreational sites owned and operated by Pierce County.

The creek is a popular location for fishing, walking, and skimboarding.
