= Lakewood Towne Center =

Shopping center on Lakewood, Washington

Coordinates: 47.163°N 122.516°W

- Location: Lakewood, Washington
- Address: 5731 Main Street SW Lakewood, WA 98499
- Opened: August 8, 1957; 69 years ago Villa Plaza; September 15, 1989; 37 years ago Lakewood Mall; August 2, 2002; 24 years ago Lakewood Towne Center
- Closed: 2001; 25 years ago Lakewood Mall
- Demolished: 2001; 25 years ago
- Developer: Villa Plaza Investment Company for Villa Plaza; Basil Vyzis for Lakewood Mall; ATC Realty Sixteen for Lakewood Towne Center
- Manager: Kite Realty Group
- Owner: Kite Realty Group
- Num. of stores: 58 as of 2026
- Website: https://www.shoplakewoodtownecenter.com/

Lakewood Towne Center is a shopping center located in Lakewood, Washington, a suburb of Tacoma. Lakewood Towne Center was created when MBK Northwest bought and demolished the enclosed portion of the failing Lakewood Mall in 2001, and turned the site into an open air destination by creating four distinct components, including a civic center with a city hall as its centerpiece, a power center, entertainment center, and a neighborhood center. Lakewood Mall itself had been a replacement for the outdoor Villa Plaza Shopping Center.

== Villa Plaza ==
Villa Plaza Shopping Center opened in 1957 on the site of the former Roman Catholic girls’ school, Visitation Villa. Visitation Villa was open from 1923 to 1954. On May 3, 1958, former boxing heavyweight champions Joe Louis and Max Baer visited and signed autographs before being flown by helicopter to the B & I Circus Store in Tacoma.

== Lakewood Mall ==
In 1985 developer Basil Vyzis acquired Villa Plaza and developed the enclosed Lakewood Mall which opened in 1989 on the site of the former Villa Plaza. Throughout the short life of the mall it suffered from poor reputation, stores that were never occupied, and the closings of major anchor tenants. Vyzis died in 1996.

== Lakewood Towne Center ==
In 2001 Lakewood Mall was acquired from ATC Realty Sixteen Inc. (a Wells Fargo subsidiary) by MBK Northwest (a Mitsui subsidiary) for $28 million. MBK had previously redeveloped the Jantzen Beach SuperCenter in Portland, Oregon and the Parkway SuperCenter in Tukwila, Washington. The enclosed portion of Lakewood Mall was demolished in 2001, leaving the anchor stores largely intact to make way for Lakewood Towne Center, which opened in 2002.

In 2004, MBK sold two-thirds of its interest in the mall to Inland Western for $81.1 million. The mall has more than 80 tenants.

On September 15, 2022, it was announced that Bed Bath & Beyond would be closing as part of a plan to close 150 stores nationwide.

== Sources ==
- City of Lakewood History
- Lakewood to Get 'Power Center'
- Lakewood Towne Center
- Villa Plaza Shopping Center (Lakewood Mall)
- MBK Northwest: Lakewood Towne Center
- Third Time’s the Charm for Lakewood retail
