= Steilacoom Tribe =

Cultural heritage organization in Washington (state)

Steilacoom Tribe Steilacoom Tribal Museum Association
- Named after: Steilacoom people
- Type: Nonprofit organization
- Headquarters: Steilacoom, Washington
- Location: United States
- Members: 800
- Chairperson: Rebecca Unzueta
- Website: steilacoomtribe.com

The Steilacoom Tribe, also Steilacoom Tribe of Indians, is an unrecognized tribe based in Steilacoom, Washington which claims descent from the historic Steilacoom people. They are neither a federally recognized tribe, nor a state-recognized tribe.

== History ==
Beginning in 1929, members embarked on an unsuccessful process of official recognition by the United States government, when they filed a petition in the Court of Claims, which they eventually dropped. In 1937, the Bureau of Indian Affairs suggested their members merge with the Nisqually Indian Tribe. However, the Nisqually protested the deal, fearing the loss of their self-determination, as, at the time, the Nisqually were smaller in number.

In 1951, the tribe was run by chairman Lewis Layton, an enrolled member of the Confederated Tribes of the Colville Reservation. In 1956, the tribe once again filed a claim under the Indian Claims Commission for the lands ceded during the treaty and won $9,246.32, however, they never accepted the money. They also filed for intervenor status during United States v. Washington (a landmark fishing rights case) but were denied.

== Leadership ==
The organization is run by a nine-member council, led by a chairperson. From 1975 until her death in 2006, Joan Ortez served as chairperson following the resignation of Lewis Layton.

== Membership ==
According to their own claims, 90 percent of the membership descends from Steilacoom people during treaty times. A 2008 investigation by the Bureau of Indian Affairs (BIA) found that "only three of them are documented descendants of persons described in 19th and early 20th century documents as Steilacoom Indians" with the remainder having Native ancestry from other sources. (Note: "The PF found that over 90 percent of the 612 STI members documented that they are Indian descendants, but only three of them are documented descendants of persons described in 19th and early 20th century documents as Steilacoom Indians" (Artman 2008, p.2))

As of 1986, the group claimed about 615 members. As of 2003 there were 665 members, and as of 2008 there were 800 members.

== Steilacoom Tribal Museum Association ==
The group formed the Steilacoom Tribal Museum Association, 501(c)(3) nonprofit organization in 2019. They operate a museum, which contains a snack bar and café, and business office, both in Steilacoom.

== See also ==
- Steilacoom people
- Nisqually Indian Tribe
- Puyallup Tribe of Indians
- Duwamish Tribe
