= Western State Hospital (Washington) =

Psychiatric hospital in Washington State, United States

- Washington Department of Social and Health Services
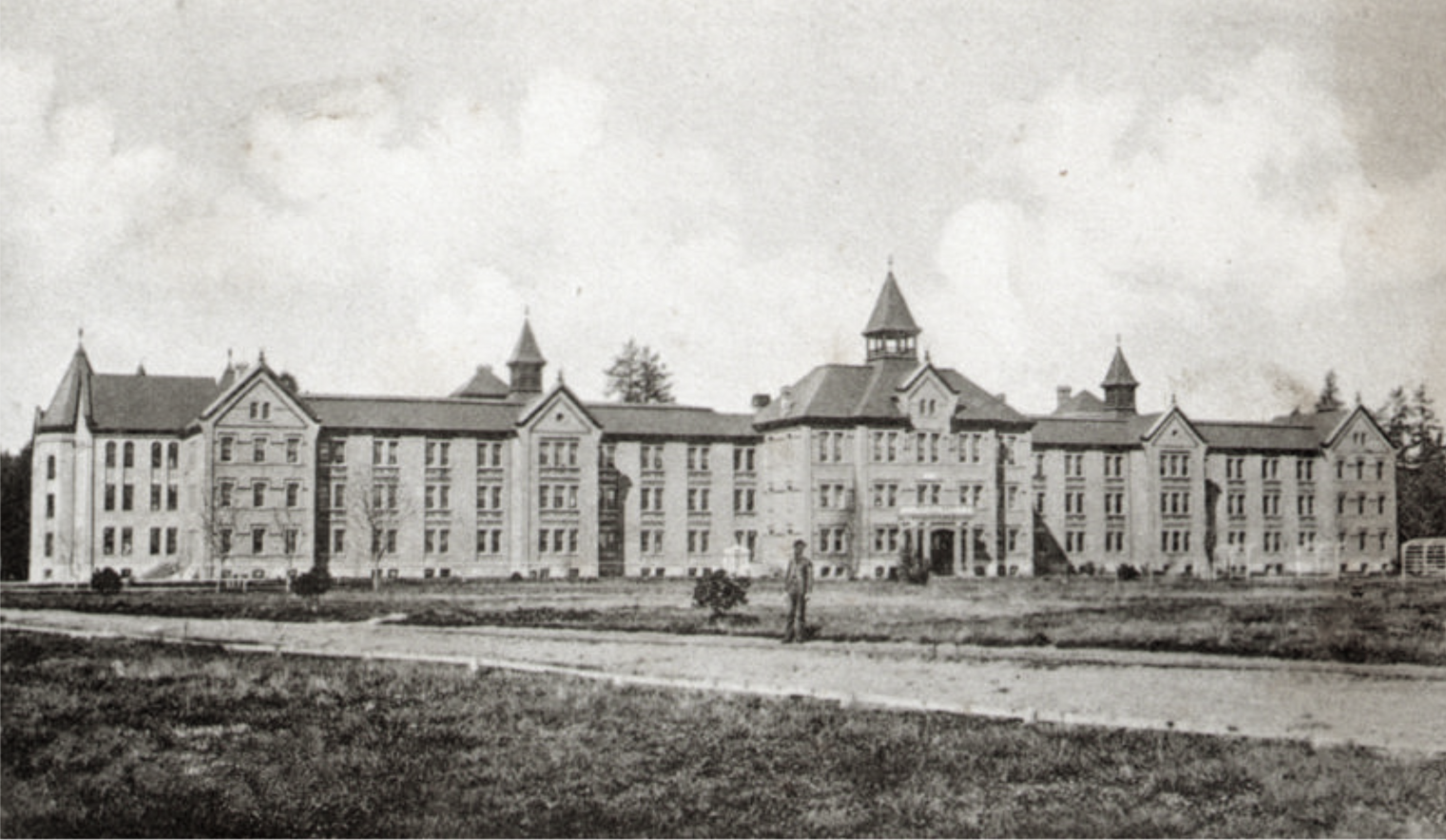
- Main hospital building, 1892

Geography
- Location: 9601 Steilacoom Blvd. SW; Lakewood, Pierce County, Washington, United States
- Coordinates: 47.178°N 122.565°W

Organization
- Care system: CMS
- Type: Psychiatric

Services
- Emergency department: No
- Beds: 806

History
- Founded: 1871

Links
- Website: Official Website at DSHS
- Lists: Hospitals in Washington state

Western State Hospital is a psychiatric hospital located at 9601 Steilacoom Boulevard SW in Lakewood, Washington. Administered by the Washington Department of Social and Health Services (DSHS), it is a large facility with 806 beds, and Washington's second-oldest state-owned enterprise (after the University of Washington).

One of two state-owned adult psychiatric hospitals, the other being Eastern State Hospital in Medical Lake, the hospital currently treats patients using psychiatric medications, mental health counseling, group therapy, drug, psychiatric rehabilitation, and behavior modification therapies. The hospital is divided into 4 specific acute treatment areas: PTRC Central and South for the treatment of civil and voluntarily committed adult patients, PTRC East for the treatment of older and geriatric patients, both civil and voluntary, the Center for Forensic Services that provides court-ordered evaluations and treatment for patients with legal charges or convictions, and the Child Study and Treatment Center, which provides treatment for children under the age of 18 years.

== History ==
The facility was established in Washington Territory as Fort Steilacoom Asylum in 1871, predating statehood by almost 20 years, in former buildings of Fort Steilacoom, which was a U.S. Army post from 1849 to 1868. In 1875, the territorial government took control due to complaints about patient neglect, brutal abuse and poor living conditions.

The original asylum was demolished in 1886 to make way for a larger building. This building, renamed Western Washington Hospital for the Insane, was designed by John G. Proctor and completed in 1887. Lillis and Goss added to the building in 1891, Oliver Perry Dennis and Lillis in 1893, Anton Berens in 1899, and Julius Zittel and Eivind Anderson in 1927. In 1915, the building was renamed Western State Hospital.

One of the hospital's better known patients was Frances Farmer.

== Incidents and controversies ==
On May 7, 1915, M. A Thompson of Tacoma was found dead in his cot after he had been strangled by his own sheets while attempting to get free. He had been committed the previous day and had been strapped to his bed due to violent behavior.

On May 24, 1915, the body of E. H. Hochsttler of Aberdeen was found at Salmon Beach in Tacoma. He had committed suicide by tying a weight around his neck before drowning himself. He had escaped from Western State three days prior.

Before the 2000s, a facilities worker found a shed full of cremated human remains packed into tobacco tins and canning jars.

Following news reports of hospital worker understaffing and several involuntarily committed patients escaping, including a person accused of murder, Governor Jay Inslee fired Western State Hospital's Chief Executive Officer, Ron Adler, on Tuesday, April 12, 2016. This also followed years of litigation involving workplace discrimination, sexual harassment, and excessively long patient admission times.

== Notable patients ==
- Frances Farmer, actress
- Isaac Zamora, perpetrator of the 2008 Skagit County shootings
