= Fort Steilacoom =

Coordinates: 47.179°N 122.564°W

- U.S. National Register of Historic Places
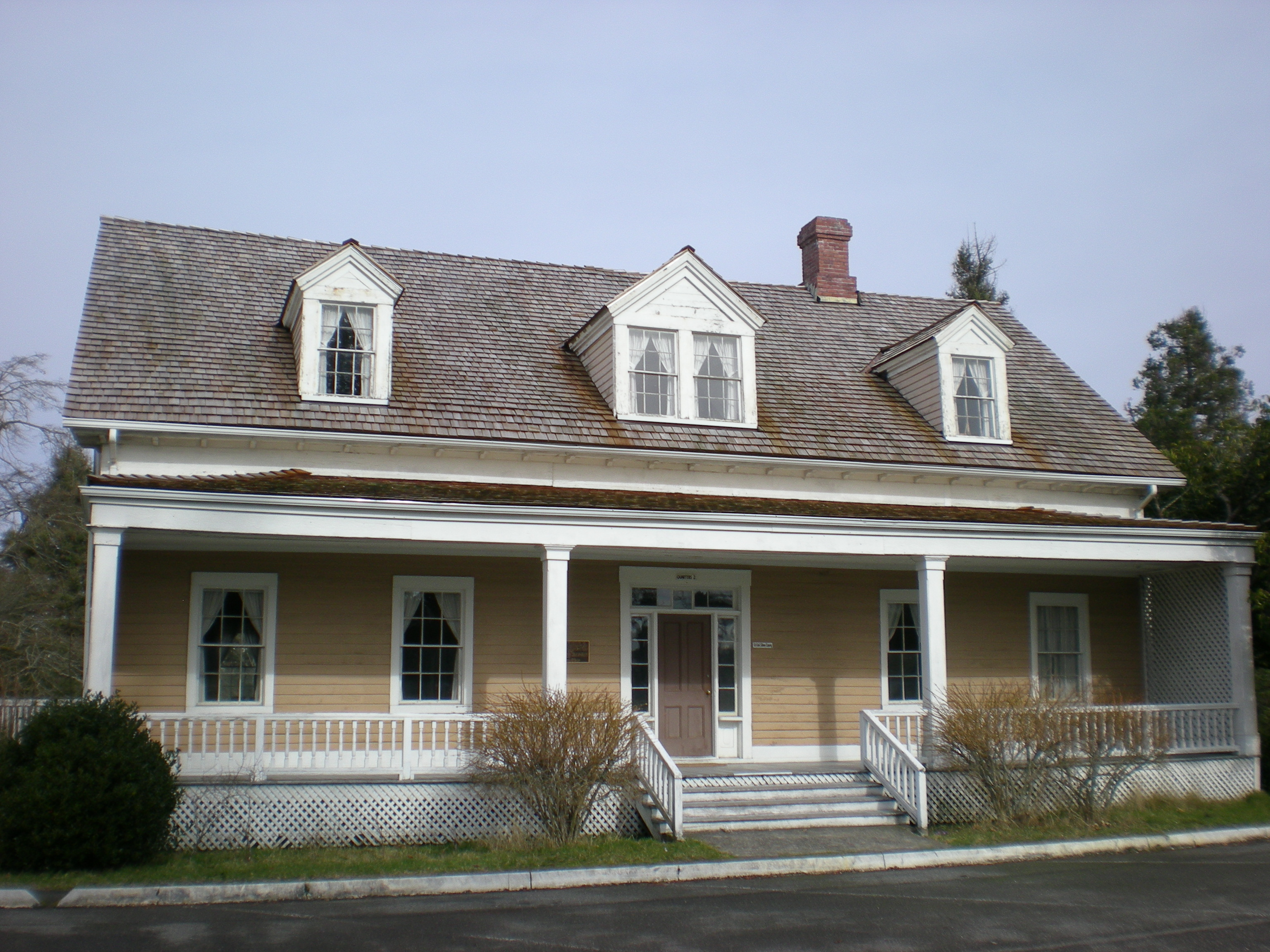
- Silas Casey's Officer's Quarters
- Location: Lakewood, Washington, U.S.
- Architect: A.V. Kautz
- NRHP reference No.: 77001350
- Added to NRHP: November 11, 1977

Fort Steilacoom was founded by the U.S. Army in 1849 between Lake Steilacoom and the Town of Steilacoom. It was among the first military fortifications built by the U.S. north of the Columbia River in what was to become the State of Washington. The fort was constructed at that site due to civilian agitation about the massacre in 1847 at the Whitman Mission and because of a Native attack on May 1, 1849, on the nearby British Fort Nisqually, in which an American bystander was killed.

The indigenous Nisqually Tribe attacked white settlers in the area on October 29, 1855, as a result of their dissatisfaction with the Treaty of Medicine Creek that had been imposed on them the previous year, particularly angered that their assigned reservation curtailed the traditional fishing economy. The fort was headquarters for the U.S. 9th Infantry Regiment during this "Indian War" of 1855–56. In the course of the conflict, Volunteer U.S. Army Colonel Abram Benton Moses was killed. At the conclusion of the war, Territorial Governor Isaac Stevens brought Chief Leschi of the Nisqually tribe to trial for the death of Moses during a skirmish at Connell's Prairie on October 31, 1855.

Since the death had occurred in combat, the United States Army refused to carry out the sentence of death on the grounds of Fort Steilacoom, maintaining that he was a prisoner of war. The territorial legislature therefore passed a law authorizing Leschi's execution at the hands of civilian authorities. On February 19, 1858, Leschi was hanged in what is today the city of Lakewood. He was exonerated in 2004.

Fort Steilacoom was decommissioned as a military post in 1868. In 1871, Washington Territory repurposed the fort as an insane asylum, with the barracks serving as patient and staff housing. Fort Steilacoom is now Western State Hospital.

Four original cottages remain and are preserved as part of a living museum, alongside a cemetery with civilian burials from the fort era (all known military burials were relocated to the San Francisco National Cemetery in the 1890s).
