= Lakewood, Washington =

City in Washington, United States

Lakewood
- City
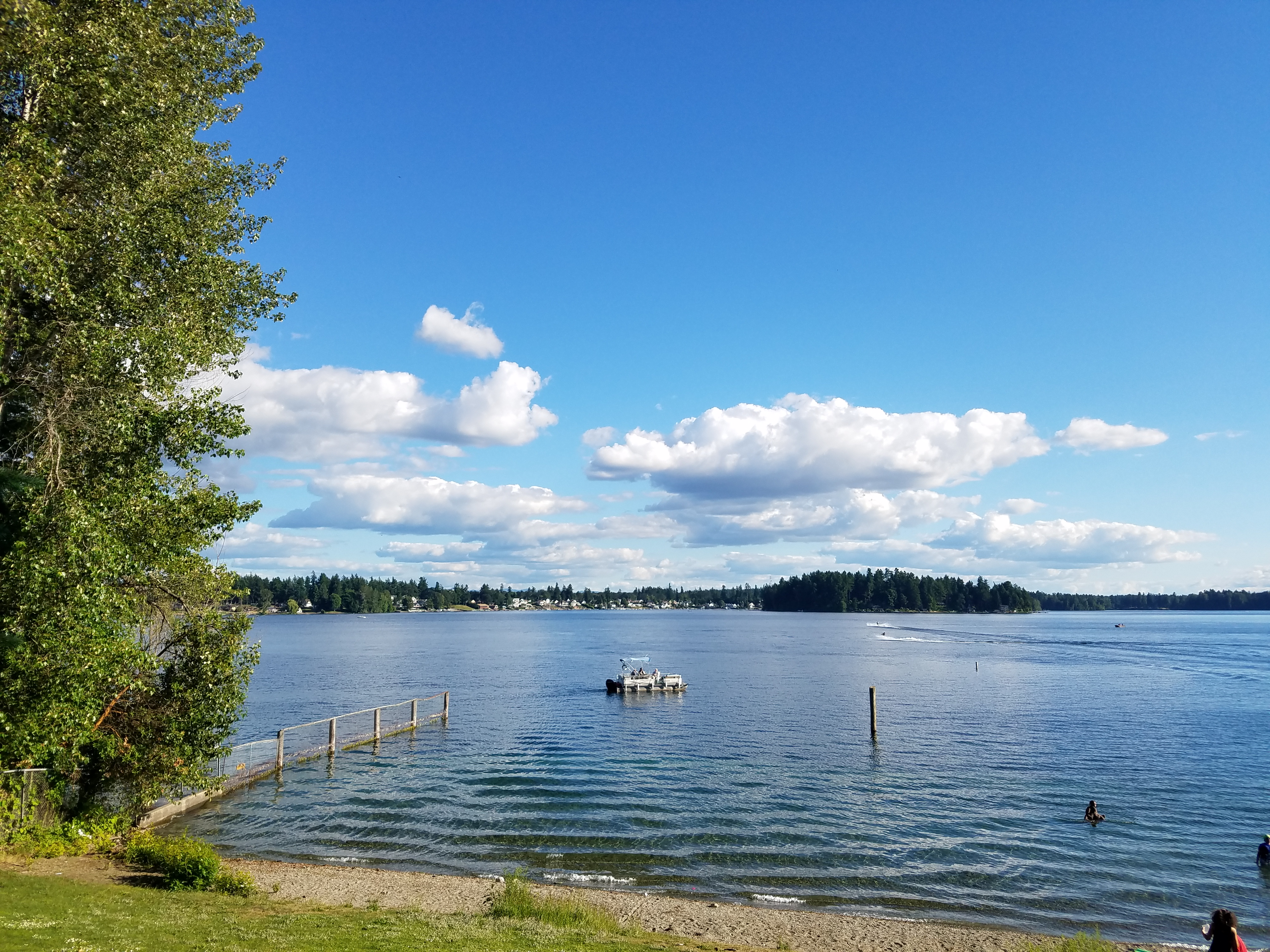
- American Lake

- Seal

- Location of Lakewood in Pierce County and Washington
- Coordinates: 47°09′32″N 122°31′15″W
- Country: United States
- State: Washington
- County: Pierce
- Settled: 1833
- Incorporated: February 28, 1996

Government
  - Type: Council–manager
  - Mayor: Paul Bocchi
  - City Manager: Doug Russell
  - Deputy Mayor: Patti Belle

Area
  - Total: 18.89 sq mi (48.93 km^{2})
  - Land: 17.06 sq mi (44.18 km^{2})
  - Water: 1.83 sq mi (4.74 km^{2}) 9.39%
- Elevation: 207 ft (63 m)

Population (2020)
  - Total: 63,612
  - Estimate (2024): 62,709
  - Rank: US: 632nd WA: 21st
  - Density: 3,670/sq mi (1,416/km^{2})
- Demonym: Lakewoodian
- Time zone: UTC–8 (Pacific (PST))
  - Summer (DST): UTC–7 (PDT)
- ZIP codes: 98439, 98498, 98499
- Area code: 253
- FIPS code: 53-38038
- GNIS feature ID: 2411615
- Sales tax: 10.1%
- Website: cityoflakewood.us

Lakewood is a city in Pierce County, Washington, United States. The population was 63,612 at the 2020 census. It is the second-largest city in the county, behind Tacoma, and is a suburban bedroom community. Lakewood is adjacent to the McChord AFB portion of Joint Base Lewis–McChord, a major military installation for the U.S. Army and U.S. Air Force.

== History ==
Lakewood was officially incorporated as a city on February 28, 1996, on the same day as Edgewood. It immediately became the second largest city in Pierce County and among the largest in the state. Three previous attempts to incorporate as a city had been rejected by voters in 1971, 1990, and 1994 before it was approved by a 20-point margin on March 14, 1995, within a smaller area. Historical names include Tacoma/Lakewood Center and Lakes District (this name was used by the U.S. Census in the 1970 and 1980 Census). Lakewood is home to the Clover Park School District, the Lakewood Water District, Fort Steilacoom Park and Western State Hospital, a regional state psychiatric hospital. Thornewood Castle was built in the vicinity of Tacoma in the area that is now Lakewood.

A small community near Arlington in Snohomish County with the name Lakewood had used the name for their post office since 1909, which led to confusion between the two areas. The United States Postal Service suggested that the new city be renamed due to frequent mixups in mail delivery that required the two post offices to forward deliveries with a one-day delay. The Snohomish County post office was renamed to North Lakewood in 1998 by the Postal Service due to the other community's unincorporated status.

In 1997, the Seafirst Bank robbery happened in Lakewood.

On November 29, 2009, four Lakewood Police Department officers were shot and killed at a coffee shop in Parkland by ex-convict Maurice Clemmons. All four officers had served with the department since its inception in 2004 and died at the scene; two baristas and several customers in the shop were not injured. Clemmons was shot and killed by a Seattle police officer two days later. The shooting is believed to be the most deadly attack on law enforcement in the state of Washington, and among the deadliest attacks on law enforcement in the United States.

== Geography ==
According to the United States Census Bureau, the city has a total area of 18.95 square miles (49.08 km^{2}), of which, 17.17 square miles (44.47 km^{2}) is land and 1.78 square miles (4.61 km^{2}) is water.

There are several lakes within the city limits. The largest is American Lake, at 1,091 acres (442 ha) with an average depth of 53 feet (16 m), followed by Lake Steilacoom, Gravelly Lake, Lake Louise, and Waughop Lake. The Waughop Lake is incorporated into the aforementioned Fort Steilacoom Park. A number of small creeks flow through Lakewood, some of which drain into nearby Puget Sound. The largest of these, Chambers Creek, flows from Lake Steilacoom to Chambers Bay between nearby University Place and Steilacoom.

== Demographics ==
Historical population
Census	Pop.	Note	%±
1970	48,195		—
1980	54,533		13.2%
1990	58,412		7.1%
2000	58,211		−0.3%
2010	58,163		−0.1%
2020	63,612		9.4%
2024 (est.)	62,709		−1.4%
U.S. Decennial Census; 2020 Census

Lakewood also boasts one of the few true International Districts in the South Sound along South Tacoma Way and Pacific Highway, with Korean, Vietnamese, Chinese, Latino and other influences (the population of Lakewood's Tillicum neighborhood is nearly half non-English speaking).

=== 2020 census ===
As of the 2020 census, Lakewood had a population of 63,612. The median age was 36.8 years. 21.4% of residents were under the age of 18 and 16.0% of residents were 65 years of age or older. For every 100 females there were 98.1 males, and for every 100 females age 18 and over there were 96.6 males age 18 and over.

100.0% of residents lived in urban areas, while 0.0% lived in rural areas.

There were 25,506 households in Lakewood, of which 28.6% had children under the age of 18 living in them. Of all households, 40.4% were married-couple households, 22.2% were households with a male householder and no spouse or partner present, and 29.2% were households with a female householder and no spouse or partner present. About 30.5% of all households were made up of individuals and 10.9% had someone living alone who was 65 years of age or older.

There were 26,999 housing units, of which 5.5% were vacant. The homeowner vacancy rate was 1.3% and the rental vacancy rate was 5.0%.

Racial composition as of the 2020 census
Race	Number	Percent
White	31,287	49.2%
Black or African American	8,335	13.1%
American Indian and Alaska Native	841	1.3%
Asian	5,807	9.1%
Native Hawaiian and Other Pacific Islander	2,512	3.9%
Some other race	5,737	9.0%
Two or more races	9,093	14.3%
Hispanic or Latino (of any race)	11,516	18.1%

=== 2010 census ===
As of the 2010 census, there were 58,163 people, 24,069 households, and 14,412 families living in the city. The population density was 3,387.5 inhabitants per square mile (1,307.9/km^{2}). There were 26,548 housing units at an average density of 1,546.2 per square mile (597.0/km^{2}). The racial makeup of the city was 59.3% White, 11.8% African American, 1.3% Native American, 9.0% Asian, 2.6% Pacific Islander, 7.3% from other races, and 8.7% from two or more races. Hispanic or Latino of any race were 15.3% of the population.

There were 24,069 households, of which 29.8% had children under the age of 18 living with them, 39.3% were married couples living together, 15.1% had a female householder with no husband present, 5.5% had a male householder with no wife present, and 40.1% were non-families. 32.3% of all households were made up of individuals, and 9.5% had someone living alone who was 65 years of age or older. The average household size was 2.36 and the average family size was 2.98.

The median age in the city was 36.6 years. 22.7% of residents were under the age of 18; 10.9% were between the ages of 18 and 24; 26.4% were from 25 to 44; 26.5% were from 45 to 64; and 13.6% were 65 years of age or older. The gender makeup of the city was 49.0% male and 51.0% female.

== Economy ==
As of 2023, Lakewood has a total of 30,662 full-time jobs, of which over 9,000 are in the healthcare sector. The largest employer is St. Clare Hospital, with 598 employees, followed by Aero Precision and the Korean Women's Association. The city's economy is highly dependent on its proximity to Joint Base Lewis-McChord, a major military installation with 55,000 total employees. The city had $1.65 billion in taxable retail sales in 2022.

== Arts and culture ==
Local sites include:

- Fort Steilacoom, a historic army fort.
- Lakewold Gardens, an estate garden.
- Lakewood Towne Center, a shopping center.
- Lakewood Playhouse, a theater founded in 1938.
- Thornewood, a historic estate.

=== Library ===
Lakewood is served by the Pierce County Library System, which has operated a public library in the area since it was annexed in 1996. An earlier library had been established in the community in February 1947 at a hobby shop in the Clover Park Shopping Center. It moved between various buildings, including the basement of a local school, while funds were collected by the Friends of the Lakes District Library for a permanent building. The Flora B. Tenzler Memorial Library opened on August 1, 1963, with donations from the Tenzler Foundation to cover the cost of construction and furnishings.

The Tenzler Library was expanded in 1974 with additional funds from the foundation and renamed to the Lakewood Library in 1982. The Pierce County Library System closed the branch in June 2022 after several building inspections had found substantial roof damage that would cost an estimated $22 million to repair. The Lakewood location had been one of the most-used in Pierce County prior to the COVID-19 pandemic. An interim Lakewood location opened in September 2024 after two years of lease negotiations; it cost $9.5 million to construct and includes 75,000 square feet (7,000 m^{2}) of interior space. A permanent replacement is planned to be rebuilt on the same site as the original Lakewood Library at an unspecified date.

== Education ==
The Clover Park School District, which includes most of the city, operates all public schools within Lakewood. Private schools include St Frances Cabrini School, St Mary's Christian School, and Lakewood Lutheran School.

Lakewood is also home to Pierce College's Fort Steilacoom branch campus and Clover Park Technical College.

Portions of Lakewood are in the Steilacoom Historical School District and Tacoma Public Schools.

== Media ==
Lakewood's news is primarily covered by The News Tribune (Tacoma), and sometimes by the media in Seattle. Earlier weekly newspapers for the community were the Lakewood Log (circa 1930s), Suburban Times (1960s–1982), Lakewood Press (1980s), and Lakewood Journal (1990s).

KLAY-AM radio provides Lakewood-specific talk radio. KVTI-FM, known as "I-91 FM", broadcast top 40 music from its Lakewood studio at Clover Park Technical College until 2010, when the college transferred management of the station to Washington State University's Northwest Public Radio who discontinued the locally produced programming in favor of a network feed from the University's Pullman campus. The Clover Park School District operated KCPQ (thus the call letters) until 1980, when the district sold the station to Kelly Broadcasting.

Lakewood receives Seattle area television and radio stations.

== Religion ==
Religion in Lakewood reflects the broader religious composition of Washington state and the South Puget Sound. Christianity is the largest religious tradition, with a strong presence of non-denominational Protestant churches alongside Roman Catholic, Baptist, Lutheran, Methodist, Pentecostal, and Orthodox Christian congregations. Roman Catholicism is represented principally by the Lakewood Catholic Parish Family, According to the Pew Research Center Religious Landscape Study, 51% of adults in Washington identify as Christian, including 23% Evangelical Protestant, 14% Catholic, and 9% Mainline Protestant, while 38% identify as religiously unaffiliated. The city’s proximity to Joint Base Lewis–McChord and its diverse population have also contributed to the presence of Muslim, Buddhist, Hindu, and Sikh communities.

== Infrastructure ==
=== Transportation ===
The western terminus of State Route 512 is in Lakewood, at its intersection with Interstate 5. A highway across Joint Base Lewis–McChord, to be part of State Route 704, was planned in the 2000s to connect with Interstate 5 in Lakewood. It was postponed and later cancelled due to high costs and issues in environmental review.

Lakewood is served by Pierce Transit, a public transit operator that serves the county and is headquartered in the city. Lakewood station is served by Pierce Transit and Sound Transit Express buses as well as the Sounder commuter rail system. It opened in 2012 as the southern terminus of the Sounder S Line, which runs north through Tacoma and the Green River Valley to Seattle.

=== Police ===
The City of Lakewood contracted with the Pierce County Sheriff's Office for police services between 1996 and 2004. Independent police and patrol operations under the Lakewood Police Department began on November 1, 2004.

=== Firefighters ===
Lakewood is served by West Pierce Fire and Rescue (WPFR). WPFR was formed by merging Lakewood Fire District 2 into University Place Fire District 3 in 2011. WPFR has 6 stations with 5 located in Lakewood and 1 located in University Place. WPFR also serves the Town of Steilacoom through a contract for services, however, service is provided to the Town via the stations located in Lakewood.

=== Utilities ===
Electricity service within the city is provided by three entities. The east side of Lakewood is served by Lakeview Light and Power, a nonprofit cooperative that primarily uses hydroelectricity from the federal Bonneville Power Administration. Tacoma Power, a public utility based in Tacoma with its own hydroelectric facilities, serves the north side of the city. Puget Sound Energy, a private company that uses a mix of natural gas, coal, wind, and hydroelectricity, serves the western side of the city and is the sole provider in Lakewood of natural gas for heating. The Lakewood Water District provides tap water to 17,680 connected customers in the city and surrounding areas, as well as neighboring Steilacoom. The independent water district has 31 groundwater wells and a capacity of 27 million US gallons (100 Ml). Lakewood's sanitary sewer and waste treatment system is maintained by Pierce County Public Works and Utilities, while the city government controls and treats stormwater.

=== Health care ===
Lakewood is the home of St. Clare Hospital, a general hospital that includes a Level IV trauma center and other services. It originally opened in 1961 as Lakewood General Hospital and was gradually expanded to a 105-bed facility within the following 25 years. A new, eight-story hospital building with 86 private beds opened in September 1989 at a cost of $18 million. Lakewood General was acquired by non-profit Catholic healthcare system Franciscan Health Services in July 1990 and renamed to St. Clare Hospital.

The federal government's Veterans Health Administration operates the VA American Lake Medical Center, which serves as an auxiliary facility for the VA Puget Sound Medical Center in Seattle. It originally opened in 1924 as a veteran's hospital on a portion of Fort Lewis. The U.S. military also operates Madigan Army Medical Center on Joint Base Lewis–McChord, one of the largest military hospitals in the United States. The Washington state government operates Western State Hospital, a psychiatric hospital with 745 beds on the site of Fort Steilacoom in Lakewood.

== Notable people ==
- Zach Banner, professional American football player
- Llewellyn Chilson, U.S. Army soldier
- Emeka Egbuka, NFL wide receiver for the Tampa Bay Buccaneers
- Edgar N. Eisenhower, attorney and brother of U.S. president Dwight D. Eisenhower
- William Hardin Harrison, U.S. Army General and first mayor of Lakewood
- Adre-Anna Jackson, unsolved death
- Jermaine Kearse, professional American football player
- Craig Lancaster, novelist
- James S. Russell, U.S. Navy Admiral

== Sister cities ==
- Bauang, La Union, Philippines
- Danzhou, China (friendship city)
- Gimhae, South Korea (since 2022; upgraded from friendship city)
- Okinawa, Japan
