= List of the oldest buildings in Washington =

List of the oldest buildings in Washington may refer to:

- List of the oldest buildings in Washington (state)
- List of the oldest buildings in Washington, D.C.
