= DuPont Village Historic District =

Historic district in Washington, United States

- U.S. National Register of Historic Places
- U.S. Historic district
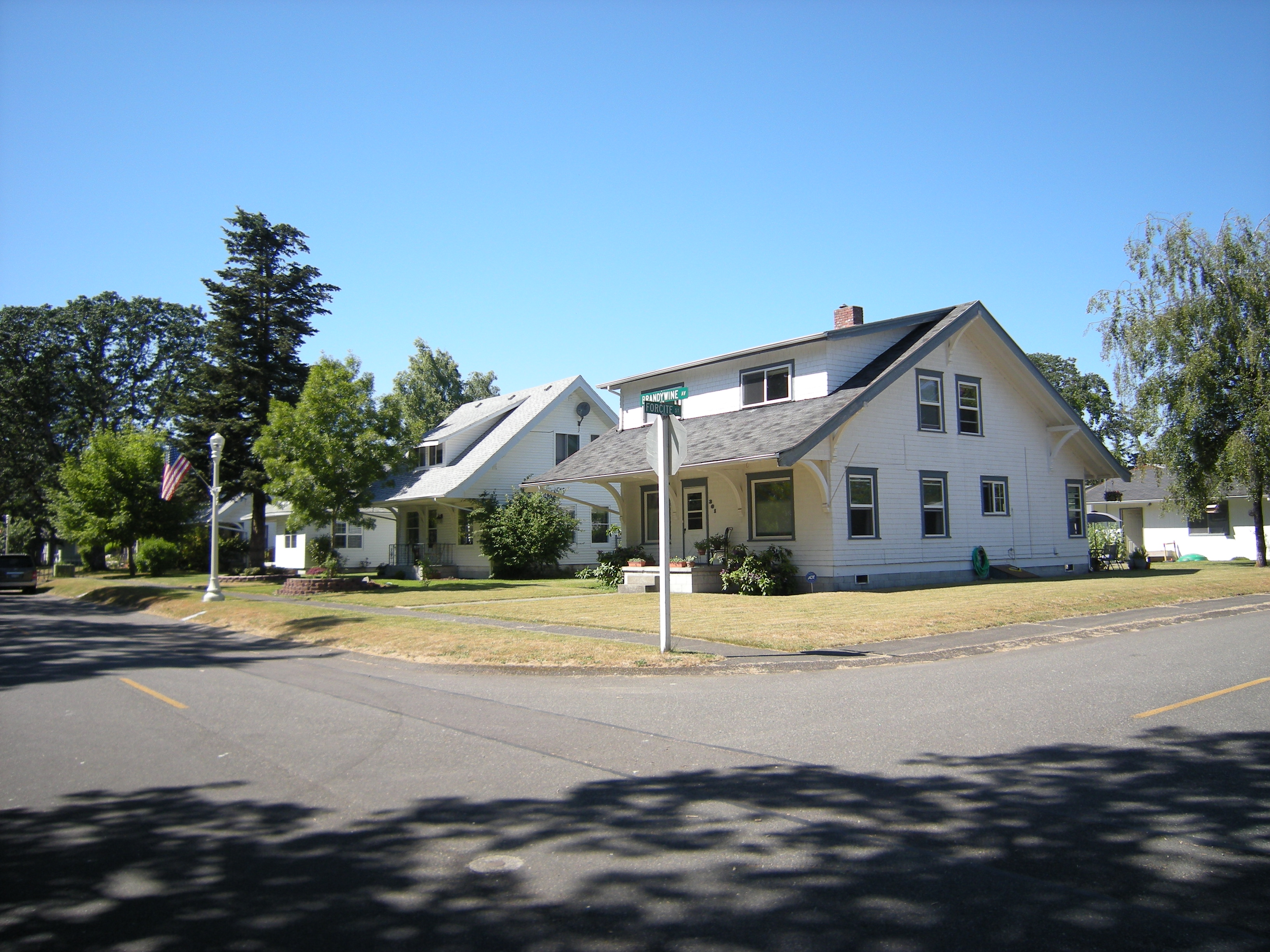
- Street corner in the district

- Location within Washington (state) Location within the United States
- Location: Roughly bounded by Santa Cruz, Brandywine, DuPont, and Penniman, DuPont, Washington
- Coordinates: 47.096904°N 122.630578°W
- Area: 43 acres (17 ha)
- Built: 1906-1915
- Architect: E. I. du Pont de Nemours and Company
- Architectural style: Bungalow, Craftsman, American Foursquare
- NRHP reference No.: 87001542
- Added to NRHP: September 10, 1987

The DuPont Village Historic District is a historic district and neighborhood of DuPont, Washington. It is roughly bounded by Brandywine Ave, DuPont Ave, Santa Cruz St, and Penniman St. The village was originally a company town built by the DuPont chemical company to house workers for the nearby dynamite plant.

It was listed on the National Register of Historic Places in 1987; the listing included 80 contributing buildings on 43 acres (17 ha).

== History ==
The village is near the area where the original Fort Nisqually once stood. The fort was built by the Hudson's Bay Company in 1833 and operated until 1869, after which the last officer at the fort, Edward Huggins, gained ownership of the land. The Huggins family sold the land to E. I. du Pont de Nemours and Company in 1906.

The DuPont company underwent a corporate restructuring and expansion under Pierre S. du Pont beginning in 1903. During this expansion, the company decided to build a new dynamite plant in the Pacific Northwest, spurred by the growth of mining in Alaska, the building of railroads on the West Coast, and the construction of buildings and infrastructure in western cities. The company chose the old Fort Nisqually site as the location of the plant due in part to its proximity to roads, rail lines, and marine shipping lanes. Construction on the plant began in 1908, and the company began building a permanent village to house the plant workers about a mile southeast of the fort site the following year.

The first 58 houses in the village were built in 1909, including particularly large houses for the plant superintendent and assistant superintendent. Construction continued over the following decade with six more houses in 1912, six more in 1915, and 33 more in 1916. By 1917, the company town also had two stores as well as a butcher shop, club house, hotel, playground, school, and church. Generally, the size of a worker's house correlated with the position of the worker in the company hierarchy, with most lower-level workers living in smaller houses while workers in management positions at the plant living in larger houses. DuPont named the village streets after important people in the company or other plants run by the company. For example, Brandywine Ave was named after Brandywine Creek in Delaware, the site of DuPont's first gunpowder plant; Santa Cruz street was named after a plant in California; Penniman Ave was named after Russell S. Penniman, chemist and manager of DuPont's west coast operations; and Barksdale Ave was named after Hamilton Barksdale, a company executive who helped select the location for the Pacific Northwest dynamite plant.

The dynamite plant operated for nearly 70 years, from 1909 to 1976. Explosives manufactured by the plant were used for military efforts during World War I and World War II as well as for numerous civilian projects such as mining, railroad construction, and building of the Panama Canal. The plant employed 280 workers in 1943, of which 115 lived in the village. Most of the remainder commuted in from Tacoma. By 1959, the plant had produced over 1 billion pounds (450 million kilograms) of dynamite.

The DuPont company owned all the houses in the village until 1951, at which point they no longer saw the need to operate the company town due to improvements in transportation to the area as well as a larger portion of plant workers living in distant neighborhoods outside the village. In 1951, the company began selling the houses to the workers, and the residents chose to incorporate as the town of DuPont, Washington. The former butcher shop served as the town hall from then until 1977, when the building became home to the DuPont Museum. Plant workers continued to make up the majority of the town residents until the plant closed in 1976. Weyerhaeuser bought the plant after it closed and demolished it, but the original village was left intact, and greenbelts were set up around the village area to protect it from further development. The village was added to the National Register of Historic Places on September 10, 1987.

== Significance ==
The district includes 119 buildings over its 43 acres (17 ha), of which 80 are considered contributing members of the historic district. It contains the town's only surviving structures from the 1909-1976 DuPont dynamite plant era. The district provides a well-preserved example of one of the many company towns that were built across rural Pierce County during the early 20th century when local economic activity was expanding in various industries. The 1987 National Register of Historic Places nomination form notes that the DuPont Village is the only one of those company towns that "remains intact as a complete entity."
