= List of the oldest buildings in Washington (state) =

This article lists the oldest extant buildings in Washington (state), including extant buildings and structures constructed prior to and during the United States rule over Washington. Only buildings built prior to 1860 are suitable for inclusion on this list, or the building must be the oldest of its type.

In order to qualify for the list, a structure must:

- be a recognizable building (defined as any human-made structure used or intended for supporting or sheltering any use or continuous occupancy);
- incorporate features of building work from the claimed date to at least 1.5 metres (4.9 ft) in height and/or be a listed building.

This consciously excludes ruins of limited height, roads and statues. Bridges may be included if they otherwise fulfill the above criteria. Dates for many of the oldest structures have been arrived at by radiocarbon dating or dendrochronology and should be considered approximate. If the exact year of initial construction is estimated, it will be shown as a range of dates.

== List of oldest buildings ==
Building	Image	Location	First built	Use	Notes
The Prince's Cabin		Frenchtown, Washington	1837	Fur Trader cabin	Hudson's Bay Company fur trader's log cabin moved to current historical site from a Cayuse wintering location.
Granary at Fort Nisqually		Tacoma, Washington	1843	Trading Post granary	Hudson's Bay Company
Covington House		Vancouver, Washington	1848	Residence	
Grant House		Vancouver, Washington	1850	Residence	
John R. Jackson House		Lewis County, Washington	1850	Residence	Oldest building in the state used as a courthouse; also known as Jackson Courthouse
Miles Weston House		Steilacoom, Washington	1852-53	Residence	Oldest house in Steilacoom
Daniel R. Bigelow House		Olympia, Washington	1854	Residence	Oldest house in Olympia
Judge Columbia Lancaster House		Ridgefield, Washington	1850–1855	Residence	
Factor's House at Fort Nisqually		Tacoma, Washington	1855	Trading Post	Hudson's Bay Company
Steilacoom Catholic Church		Steilacoom, Washington	1855	Church	Oldest Catholic church in Washington; Moved to present location in 1864.
Cape Disappointment Light		Ilwaco, Washington	1856	Lighthouse	First lighthouse lit in the state
Pickett House		Bellingham, Washington	1856	Residence	Oldest house in Bellingham
Cape Flattery Light		Neah Bay, Washington	1857	Lighthouse	
Claquato Church		Chehalis, Washington	1857	Church	Oldest church building on original foundation
Joseph Borst House		Centralia, Washington	1857	Residence	
New Dungeness Light Station		Sequim, Washington	1857	Lighthouse	
Davidson House		Steilacoom, Washington	1858	Residence	
T. G. Richards and Company Store		Bellingham, Washington	1858	Commercial	Oldest brick building in the state built with brick from San Francisco
Colonel Granville & Henrietta Haller House		Coupeville, Washington	1859	Residence	Original portion of the house is the originally separate Brunn House
O. B. McFadden House		Chehalis, Washington	1859	Residence	Oldest house in Chehalis
J. F. Strong House		Spokane, Washington	1879	Residence	One of oldest buildings in Spokane
Ward House		Seattle, Washington	1882	Residence	One of oldest buildings in Seattle

== See also ==
- National Register of Historic Places listings in Washington (state)
- History of Washington (state)
- Oldest buildings in the United States
