= DuPont Museum =

DuPont Historical Museum
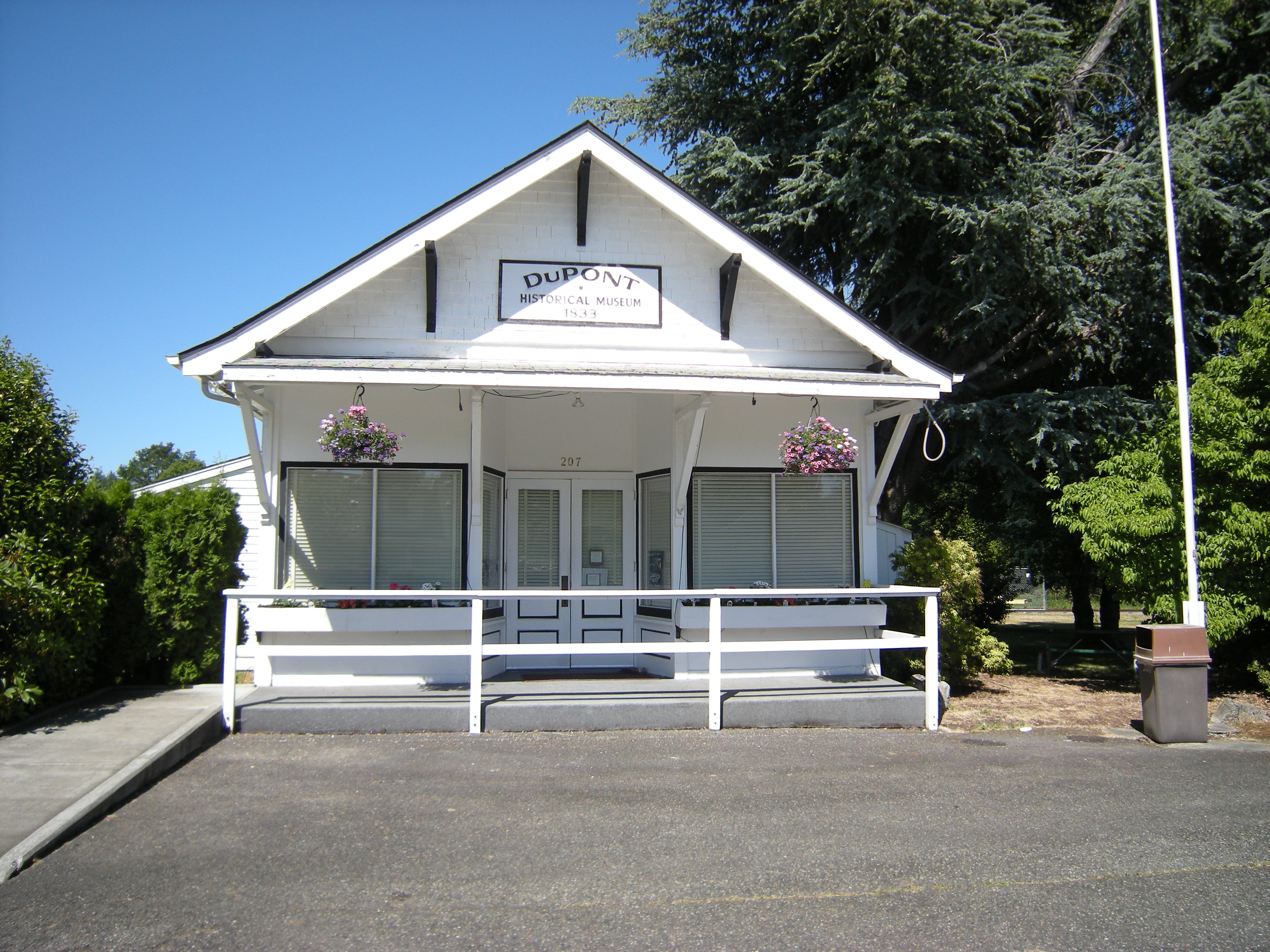
- DuPont Museum in 2008
- Established: 1977
- Location: 207 Barksdale Avenue; DuPont, Washington, USA
- Coordinates: 47.0954°N 122.6284°W
- Type: History
- Curator: Linda Cumberbatch
- Website: dupontmuseum.com

The DuPont Museum is a historical museum in DuPont, Washington. It is located in the DuPont Village Historic District. The museum contains exhibits and artifacts relating to the city's history, including both when it was the locale of the Hudson's Bay Company's Fort Nisqually as well as when it was a company town for the DuPont dynamite plant.

The museum was opened in 1977 in the former DuPont City Hall building. In 1982 a non-profit foundation, the DuPont Historical Society, was formed to operate the museum. The museum continues to support the 8,000, and growing, citizens of DuPont and Pierce County.

The museum organizes the annual "Hudson's Bay Day" celebration commemorating the role of the Hudson's Bay Company and Fort Nisqually in local history.
