= Antoine Langlois =

Antoine Langlois (1812-1892) was a Catholic priest that acted as a missionary in the Pacific Northwest and later California.

== Early life ==
Anthony Langlois was born in Saint-Pierre-de-la-Rivière-du-Sud, Quebec, on 10 November 1812. Langlois studied at Collège de Sainte-Anne-de-la-Pocatière. He was ordained as a minister by Pierre-Flavien Turgeon at Cathedral-Basilica of Notre-Dame de Québec in 1838. After several assignments in Quebec, Langlois joined Jean-Baptiste Bolduc on a journey to the Pacific Northwest to aid Catholic conversion efforts there.

== Polynesia ==
Langlois departed from Boston on 14 September 1841 and sailed for the Pacific Ocean via the Cape Horn. Their vessel visited the port of Valparaíso at the end of December, where they waited for 63 days for another ship to continue ferrying them. They then went across Oceania to visit the Gambier Islands and other parts of the Polynesian Triangle. Next Langlois and Bolduc on 5 May 1842 reached the Kingdom of Tahiti. The two priests had a meeting with Queen Pōmare IV to explain their status as British subjects rather than French.

Heading north from Tahiti, on 21 June their ship reached the Kingdom of Hawaii. Greeted by fellow Catholic Louis Désiré Maigret, he informed the two priests that they had to wait several days for the next ship to visit Honolulu, the Hudson's Bay Company barge Cowlitz. On 18 August the Cowlitz left the port of Honolulu for the Columbia River.

== Pacific Northwest ==
Disembarking at Fort George on 19 September, the Catholics met priests from the Methodist Mission departing the region for the United States of America. Langlois and Bolduc on 15 October reached Fort Vancouver where they were greeted by John McLoughlin. The two priests reached St. Paul on 17 October after traveling through the Willamette Valley and Oregon City. Vicar general François Blanchet, their superior, after having the men join him in performing religious services, gave them their appointments. Langlois was to remain at St. Paul while Bolduc was to winter at the St. Francis Xavier Mission.

Over the next six years Langlois was often stationed at St. Francis Xavier to proselytise among the Cowlitz people. During this time he met members of the Jesuit Order, such as Michael Accolti, John Nobili and Pierre-Jean De Smet, who likely had an influence on him in considering joining the order. Intending to study further in Quebec, Langlois departed from the Pacific Northwest early in 1849.

== California ==
While in the Boomtown of San Francisco, Father Jean Baptiste Brouillet convinced Langlois to remain there to administer the spiritual needs of the California Gold Rush city. He was active in the city until at least 1853. Bishop Joseph Alemany of the Diocese of Monterey appointed Langlois as vicar of the northern half of the spiritual district. He joined the Dominican Order in 1853 and remained an active member until the late 1860s. Langlois later was appointed to be the pastor in Spanishtown on the coast, arriving on 21 July 1866 and remained until 1872. Langlois' last position was as chaplain of the Congregation of Christian Brothers in Oakland, later appointment to an additional location in Martinez during 1872. Langlois died on 9 May 1892.
