= Ward House (Seattle) =

Historic house in Washington, United States

Coordinates: 47.6186°N 122.3242°W

- U.S. National Register of Historic Places
- Seattle Landmark
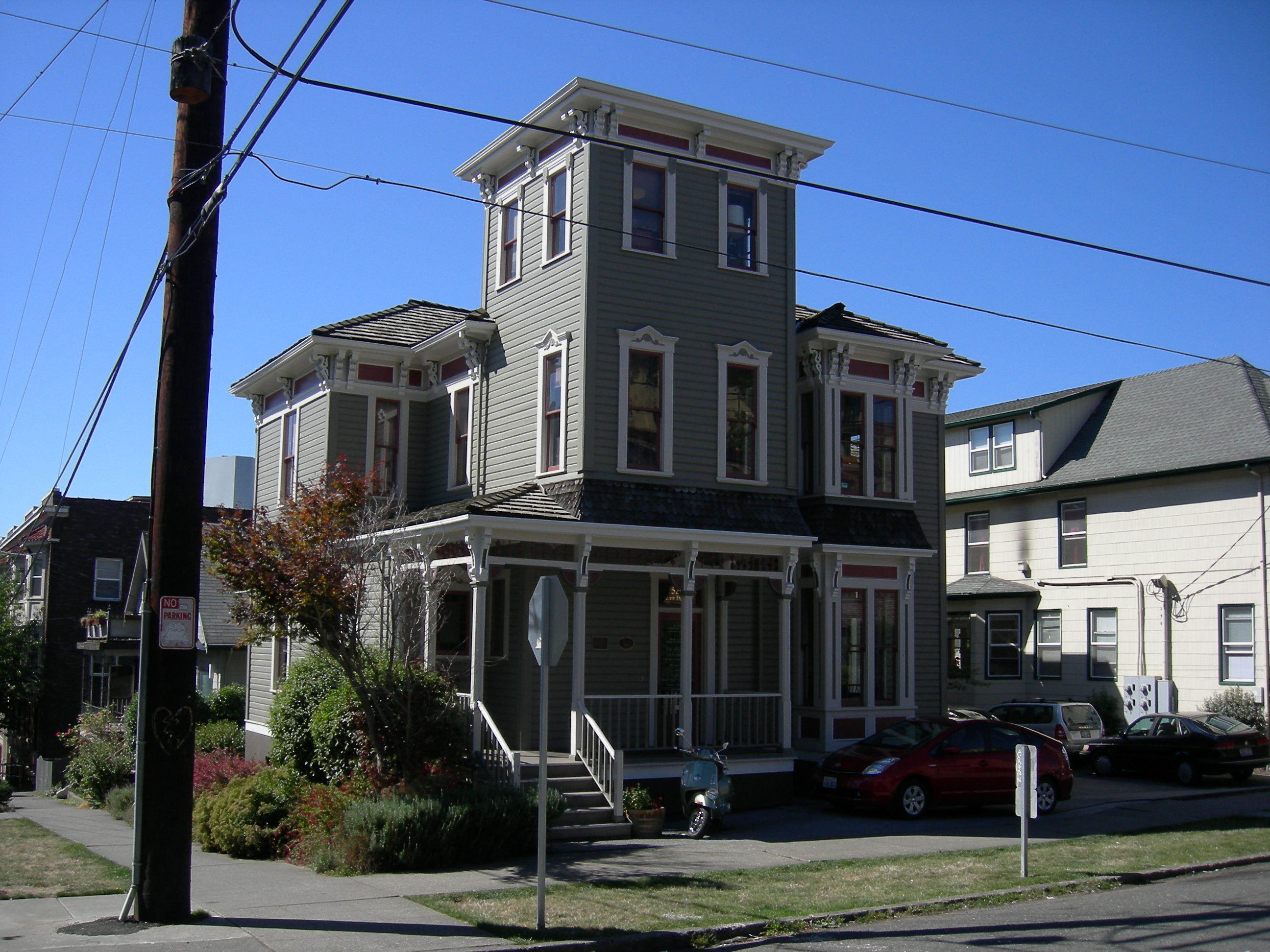
- Ward House, 2007

- Location within Downtown Seattle Location within Washington (state) Location within the United States
- Location: 520 E. Denny Way; Seattle, Washington
- Built: 1882
- Architectural style: Italian Villa
- NRHP reference No.: 72001277

Significant dates
- Added to NRHP: March 16, 1972
- Designated SEATL: December 13, 1976

The Ward House is a house on Capitol Hill in Seattle, Washington, USA. Having been built in 1882, it is one of the oldest standing houses in Seattle. Existing houses reportedly built before 1882 in Seattle include the 2629 East Aloha Street (1881), 727 28th Avenue (1870) and Maynard's House located at 3045 64th Avenue Southwest (approximately 1860 ± 2 years). Besides being listed on the National Register of Historic Places, the house, now used for offices, is also an official City of Seattle landmark.

== History ==
The building, originally located at the Southwest corner of Pike Street and Boren Avenue (11th Avenue at the time of construction), was designed, built and originally owned by carpenter and real estate speculator George W. Ward and his wife Louise Van Doren Ward. The Wards came to the Northwest in 1871 from Ottawa, Illinois, first settling on a farm in the White River valley before moving to Seattle city to be closer to their children's schools. George applied his carpentry skills to building homes and soon went into the real estate, insurance and loan business, becoming a partner in the firm of Llewellyn and Ward. By the 1890s he had moved up in his carpentry career, serving as treasurer and later president of the Pacific Manufacturing Company who made doors, sashes and blinds at the foot of Vine Street. During this time the Wards helped to establish the Japanese Baptist mission in the city and would run it for 26 years, with Louise working as a teacher and secretary and George serving as superintendent of the mission's night school.

The Wards moved out of the house around 1897 and it was converted into a boarding house. In 1906 it was moved 60' south and rotated 90 degrees to face Boren Avenue in order to make way for commercial development along Pike Street and it would eventually be sandwiched between two apartment buildings, serving as an annex to the Crest Hotel to the North. The home survived there for 80 years, outlasting most of its contemporaries in the area. In 1962, the architect Victor Steinbrueck wrote of it, "…this fanciful example of residential Victorian carpenter Gothic, one of the most interesting and apparently sound of the rare few remaining… could be made delightfully attractive by sympathetic preservation…"

The home's architectural significance was further recognized in 1972 when it was nominated for state landmark status. Nonetheless, it was vacant and deteriorating by 1974 and was scheduled for demolition in the mid-1980s. The owners, Dr. and Mrs. Michael Buckley, donated the structure to Historic Seattle, a nonprofit architectural preservation organization chartered as a public development authority by the city. Historic Seattle in turn sold it to David Leen, a local lawyer, for $7,500. On April 6, 1986, Leen moved the Ward House from its First Hill lot on Boren Avenue between Union and Pike Streets to its current location at the corner of E. Denny Way and Belmont Avenue E. Leen worked to restore the building using fixtures and furniture from the original time period. The building was occupied by Leen's law office, as well as several other solo practices, until 2016. It is now owned and occupied by Tola Capital, LLC.

== See also ==
- List of the oldest buildings in Washington (state)
