= Jean-Baptiste-Zacharie Bolduc =

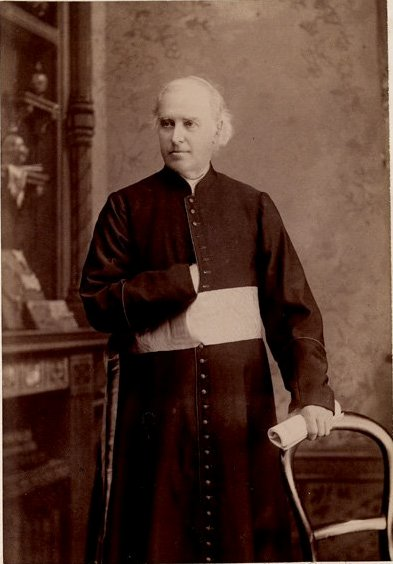
- Jean-Baptiste-Zacharie Bolduc
- Born: 30 November 1818; Saint-Joachim, Quebec
- Died: 8 May 1889 (aged 70); Quebec City

Ecclesiastical career
- Religion: Catholic Church
- Ordained: 22 August 1841
- Title: Prelate

Jean-Baptiste-Zacharie Bolduc (30 November 1818 – 8 May 1889) was a French Canadian Jesuit. His career started as a missionary in the Pacific Northwest, where he resided for eight years. Later he worked in the Catholic medical efforts in Québec.

== Early life ==
Jean-Baptiste Bolduc was born in Saint-Joachim, Lower Canada and ordained as a priest on 22 August 1841.

== Polynesia ==
Along with Antoine Langlois, another Catholic priest, Bolduc was sent to aid Catholic conversion efforts in the Pacific Northwest, with the two priests sailing from Boston on 14 September 1841. Their vessel visited the port of Valparaíso at the end of December, where they waited for 63 days for another ship to continue ferrying them. A tour of the Polynesian Triangle commenced, with the Gambier Islands visited first. The Kingdom of Tahiti was reached on 5 May 1842. The two priests had a meeting with Queen Pōmare IV to explain their status as British subjects rather than French.

Next their ship sailed for the Kingdom of Hawaii, the voyage ending on 21 June. The priests were greeted by fellow Catholic Louis Désiré Maigret, who informed them that they had to wait several days for the next ship to visit Honolulu, the Hudson's Bay Company barge Cowlitz. Bolduc occupied his time by teaching at a school for Native Hawaiian children. The Cowlitz entered Honolulu on 1 August and departed for the Columbia River on the 18th.

== Pacific Northwest ==
The priests disembarked at Fort George on 19 September, where they met priests from the Methodist Mission departing for the United States of America. Plying the Columbia on a canoe, the priests were greeted by John McLoughlin at Fort Vancouver on 15 October. Traveling through the Willamette Valley and Oregon City, the two Jesuits reached St. Paul on 17 October. Waiting for them was their superior, Vicar general François Blanchet, who, after having the men join him in performing religious services, gave them their appointments. Bolduc was to winter at the St. Francis Xavier Mission while Langlois was to remain at St. Paul.

On 30 October Bolduc reached St. Francis Xavier, the church still under construction. He found many Cowlitz "still infidels, who do not want to give up their superstitions at all to submit to the yoke of the gospel." Despite this a former slave freed by Modeste Demers gave valuable service as a translator, and many Cowlitzes requested baptisms when near death. He witnessed an eruption of Mount St. Helens on 5 December. Bolduc was eager to explore the northern Puget Sound, along with Vancouver Island, to locate the site of a permanent missionary station. He joined James Douglas and a detachment of HBC employees at Fort Nisqually on 10 March 1843. Douglas was leading the party to Vancouver Island to establish Fort Victoria. Departing on the Beaver on the 13th, the party reached Whidbey Island the next day. A temporary chapel was constructed out of sailing canvas and pine by several HBC employees. Bolduc estimated that a gathering of 1,200 Klallams, Cowichans and Songhees was convened on the 19th, a Sunday, to hear his sermon.

After the sermon he prepared to visit islands within the Puget Sound. As his expected vessel was delayed, Bolduc hired the services of several new converts to escort him to Whidbey Island. Manned by a Cowichan noble and ten of his servants, Bolduc's rented canoe sailed south on 24 March and reached the island the next day. Bolduc spent several days waiting for Netlam, a prominent nobleman among the Lower Skagit tribe. Netlam had sailed north to Vancouver prior to Bolduc's arrival, expecting to accompany the priest to his village. After returning to his residency, Netlam promised to order the construction of a house for Bolduc. Over 200 men created a dwelling with the dimensions of 28 by 25 feet in two days. Bolduc was pleased with the gesture, reporting that "Certainly the timbers were round; but the roof was covered with cedar bark and interior covered in rush matting." He went on to perform baptisms, hold prayer sessions and teach canticles to Skagit and Klallam inhabitants. While there was rapt interest in canticles, the language barriers prevented an effective explanation of Catholic theology. He additionally stated that "During my stay among them I had experienced only comforts from them." Bolduc departed on 3 April for Fort Nisqually and thence on to St. Francis Xavier Mission. He left the Mission in October 1844 for a school in the Willamette Valley for primarily the children of American and French-Canadian farmers, where he remained throughout 1845.

== Quebec ==
Departing from the Pacific Northwest in 1850, Bolduc attended the Séminaire de Québec for a year. He acted as Vicar of Saint-Roch, along with serving as chaplain of the naval hospital in Québec City from 1851 to 1867. From 1851 to his death, Bolduc was chaplain of an asylum. Additional he served as Prosecutor of Roman Catholic Archdiocese of Quebec from 1867 until 1899.
