= Fort Nisqually =

- Fort Nisqually Site
- U.S. National Register of Historic Places
- Location: NW of Dupont off I-5
- Nearest city: DuPont, Washington
- NRHP reference No.: 74001971
- Added to NRHP: October 16, 1974

- Fort Nisqually Granary
- U.S. National Register of Historic Places
- U.S. National Historic Landmark
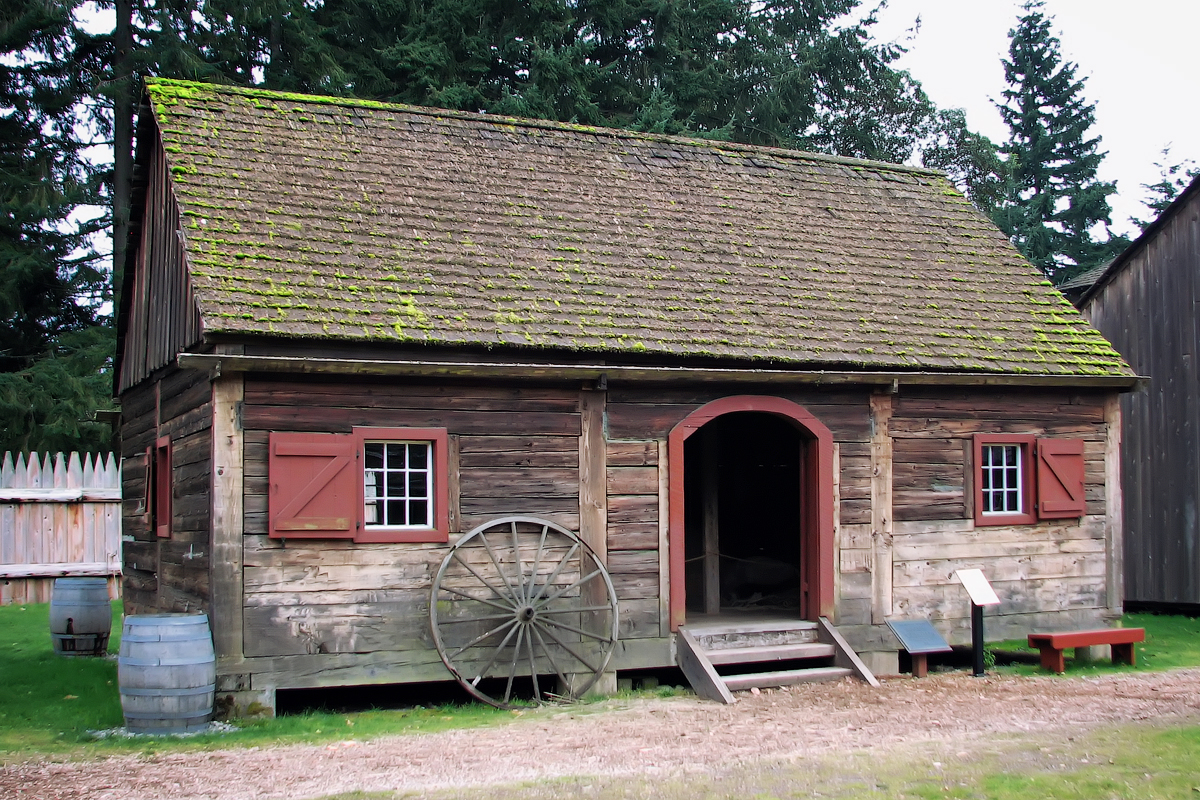

- Location within Washington (state)
- Location: Point Defiance Park; Tacoma, Washington
- Coordinates: 47°18′12.2256″N 122°31′58.9872″W
- Area: 726 square feet
- NRHP reference No.: 70000647

Significant dates
- Added to NRHP: April 15, 1970
- Designated NHL: April 15, 1970

Fort Nisqually was an important fur trading and farming post of the Hudson's Bay Company in the Puget Sound area, part of the Hudson's Bay Company's Columbia Department. It was located in what is now DuPont, Washington. Today it is a living history museum located in Tacoma, Washington, USA, within the boundaries of Point Defiance Park. The Fort Nisqually Granary, moved along with the Factor's House from the original site of the second fort to this park, is a U.S. National Historic Landmark. Built in 1843, the granary is the oldest building in Washington state and one of the only surviving examples of a Hudson's Bay Company "post-and-plank" structure. The Factor's House and the granary are the only surviving Hudson's Bay Company buildings in the United States.

== Foundation ==
The Hudson's Bay Company expanded to the west coast by forming the Columbia District to oversee its operations in what was known by American interests as the Oregon Country. Forts would be built in the District at central fur gathering locations, accessible to a large number of tribes. In 1824, Fort Vancouver was built a few miles from the Columbia River to the south, and Fort Langley was built in 1827 on the Fraser River to the north. The Cowlitz Portage, an overland and shortcut route, was soon created, and thus a vital link between the two forts was established. After the attack and murder of Alexander McKenzie and four men in his party on this route (in revenge for which the HBC leveled an unrelated S'Klallam village, killing twenty-seven people), it was determined a fort located at a halfway point was needed for safety and security reasons.

The new midway location was at Nisqually, chosen for its excellent ship anchorage. Fort Nisqually, situated at the top of a bank above Puget Sound, has a perfect anchorage for ships coming in from the ocean. In May 11, 1841, Captain Charles Wilkes, leader of the U.S. Exploring Expedition, anchored at Nisqually. "The anchorage off of Nisqually is very contracted because the bank rapidly shelves and soon drops off into deep water." On July 5, 1841, the expedition celebrated the first Fourth of July on the West Coast of the American continent. Fort Nisqually's convenience for overland travel, the friendliness of the local tribes, and its prairies for grazing animals and growing crops made the location ideal. Nisqually House, built in April 1832, is located near the mouth of Sequalitchew Creek on the plains north of the Nisqually River Delta, in what is now the town of DuPont, Washington. It was a 15 by 20 feet warehouse. The staff was only three men with a few supplies left behind to manage it. It was notably the first European trading post on the Puget Sound.

== Operations ==
One year later, in May 1833, Chief Trader Archibald McDonald returned with William Fraser Tolmie and seven men to begin the construction of a permanent fort. Tolmie spent the year there and wrote about the region extensively. The men were dependent upon the surrounding native villages for sustenance because they were unable to find much game to hunt. Relations with neighboring Indigenous people began to deepen, the officers of the post meeting with Chief Gray Head of the Steilacooms in 1833. Trading with the nearby Puyallup tribe and more distant S'Klallams developed in the same year.

Fort Nisqually was operated and served by Scottish gentlemen, Native Americans, Hawaiian Kanakas, French-Canadians, Métis, West Indians, Englishmen and, in later years, a handful of Americans. Fort Nisqually grew from an obscure trading post to a major international trading establishment, despite not being a true military outpost. The fort's main export was beaver pelts that could be used for making a beaver-pelt top hat. Over the time Fort Nisqually functioned as a trading post, about 5,000 beaver, 3,000 muskrat, 2,000 raccoon and 1,500 river otter furs were collected.

=== Puget Sound Agricultural Company ===
Founded in 1840, the Pugets Sound Agricultural Company (PSAC) was formed as a subsidiary of the HBC to meet its contractual obligations with the Russian-American Company in the RAC-HBC Agreement. Fort Nisqually and Cowlitz Farm were attached to the new venture, though it remained staffed and managed by HBC personnel. In 1841 mostly Métis families from the Red River Colony were hired by the PSAC to become pastoralists and farmers upon its two stations. After traveling overland to Fort Vancouver with James Sinclair, 14 emigrant families from the Red River Colony chose Fort Nisqually as their final destination. The station was removed in 1843 to be closer to Edmonds Marsh and Sequalitchew Creek, putting it in proximity of a water source and timber.

Fort Nisqually started to export livestock and crops for local consumption and export to principally to Russian Alaska, the Kingdom of Hawaii and Alta California. The herds of cattle, originally from Mexico, numbered over 2,000 in 1845 and supplied many of the HBC forts in the region. The sheep herds maintained were "aristocrats of the wool breeds", being composed of mixtures of Chevoit, Leicester and Southdown breeds. The flocks numbered almost 6,000 in 1845, doubled in size by 1849 but began a decrease of numbers until by 1856 the station had a little over 5,000.

Tolmie was the manager of the PSAC from 1843 to 1857, overseeing the pastoral and agricultural projects from Fort Nisqually. His tenure covered the transition from British to American control beginning in 1846 as result of the Oregon Treaty and the Puget Sound War. He was well respected because of his experience with the region and maintained friendly relations with the British, Indigenous peoples and American settlers.

=== Description ===
Catholic missionary Jean Bolduc described the station in 1843 as having:

...an enclosure of fir logs, on an average eighteen feet high, enclosing a space one hundred fifty feet on each side and having a small unarmed bastion at the four corners. Inside is a house for the superintendent, a store for trading in furs and several small buildings for the lodging of servitors and voyageurs.

=== Oregon Treaty ===
The 1846 treaty between the United States and Great Britain established the border between British North America and the United States at the 49th parallel, which left Fort Nisqually on American soil. Early American settlers around Puget Sound began arriving in numbers during the 1850s to claim land authorized by the Donation Land Claim Act. This group was dependent upon Fort Nisqually for provisions and supplies, unable to make the needed food themselves. Bartering was the norm, with agricultural produce accepted as payment. Squatters from the United States became a problem for Fort Nisqually. Twenty-eight separate attempts to take portions of the fort's land happened in 1851, jumping to 50 incidents two years later. The herds of Fort Nisqually became targeted as well, an officer reporting in 1854 that "two or three bands of Americans [are] constantly about the plains killing our beef..." With the fur trade in decline and increasing harassment from American settlers, tax collectors, and revenue agents, Fort Nisqually closed in 1869. A former employee of Fort Nisqually, Edward Huggins, became an American citizen and took over the site as his homestead.

== Management ==
Manager	Position	Tenure
Francis Heron	Chief Trader	1833–1834
William Kittson	clerk	1834–1840
Alexander C. Anderson	clerk	1840–1841
Joseph T. Heath		1841
William Henry McNeill	Chief Trader	1841–1842
Angus McDonald	postmaster	1842–1843
William Fraser Tolmie	clerk	1843–1847
William Fraser Tolmie	Chief Trader	1847–1855
William Fraser Tolmie	Chief Factor	1855–1859
Edward Huggins	clerk	1859–1870

== Restoration ==
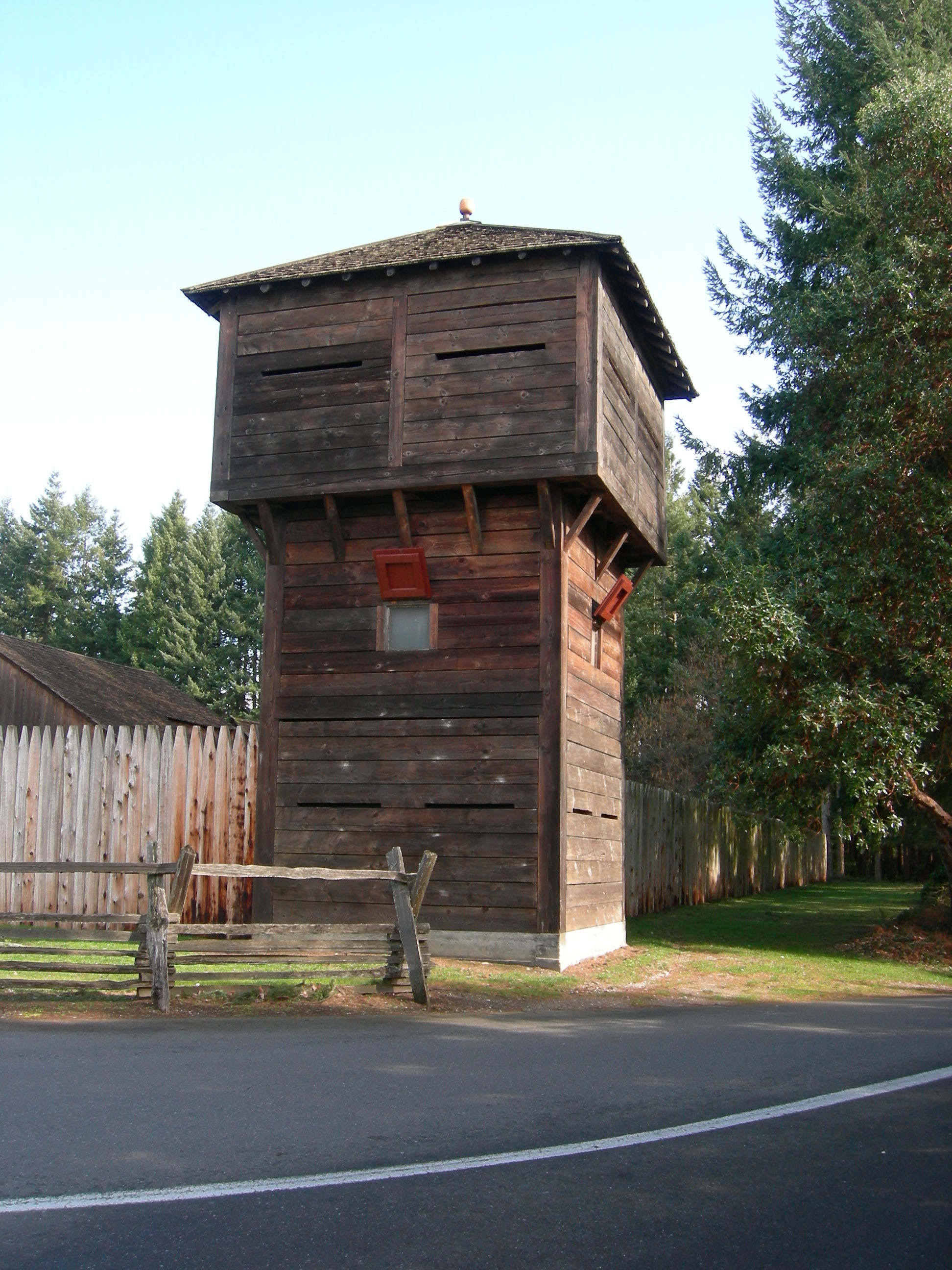
The restored Fort Nisqually blockhouse at Point Defiance Park.

In the 1930s a decision was made to build a reconstruction of Fort Nisqually in a new location: Point Defiance Park in Tacoma, Washington, approximately 15 miles from the original fort. The restoration was part of President Franklin Roosevelt's New Deal program, which provided jobs to a nation stricken by the Great Depression. The effort was funded and backed by the WPA and the Tacoma Businessmen's Association. Only two buildings, the granary and the factor's house, were moved from their original locations. The remainder had fallen into decay and were not relocated to Point Defiance.

The Fort Nisqually Granary was declared a National Historic Landmark in 1970.

== Modern use ==
Today, the restored Fort Nisqually is a living history museum run by employees and volunteers. Two of the original buildings – the Factor's House and the Granary – remain. In addition, there is a trade store, working blacksmith shop, laborers' dwelling house, laundry, root cellar, demonstration kitchen, and kitchen garden. Fort Nisqually has seen recent changes designed to capture its original character. These changes include, most significantly, the restoration of the Factor's House, as well as the relocation and restoration of the two 1830s era bastions. In addition, a section of the palisades wall is designed to replicate the 1847 era wall.

Archeology was conducted in 1988–89 to determine the placement, orientation and size of the northeast bastion and palisades wall. Hundreds of artifacts were discovered and catalogued and have been added to the historical record. In addition, much research has been conducted using the original journals as well as hundreds of letters of Edward Huggins. Huggins was a clerk of the HBC who arrived in 1850. Huggins, originally a Londoner, eventually became an American citizen and homesteaded the land and buildings after it was abandoned by the HBC. He lived on the land until 1906, when he died of colon cancer. The restored fort is managed by Metro Parks Tacoma.

The 1833 location is on The Home Course golf course in DuPont. The 1843 location in DuPont, where the buildings now at Point Defiance were originally located, is owned by The Archaeological Conservancy, is managed by DuPont Historical Society, and is closed to the public, except when opened as part of the Fort Nisqually celebration held each year. Logs mark the location of the original walls, but there are no buildings remaining. The only visible remnants of the original fort are a line of black locust trees, planted in the 1850s. DuPont's History Museum has information on the site plans and a collection of other items from the Hudson's Bay Company.

== See also ==
- List of the oldest buildings in Washington (state)

== Bibliography ==
- Bagley, Clarence B. (1915), "Journal of Occurrences at Nisqually House, 1833", The Washington Historical Quarterly, 6 (3), University of Washington: 179–197, JSTOR 40474397
- Beidleman, Richard G. (1958), "Early Fur Returns from the Pacific Northwest", Journal of Mammalogy, 39 (1), American Society of Mammalogists: 146–147, doi:10.2307/1376620, JSTOR 1376620
- Galbraith, John S. (1950), "The British and Americans at Fort Nisqually, 1846-1859", The Pacific Northwest Quarterly, 41 (2), University of Washington: 109–120
- Gibson, James R. (1985), Farming the Frontier, the Agricultural Opening of the Oregon Country 1786-1846., Vancouver, B.C.: University of British Columbia Press
- Hunt, Herbert; Kaylor, Floyd C. (1917), Washington, West of the Cascades: Historical and Descriptive; the Explorers, the Indians, the Pioneers, the Modern, vol. 1, Seattle: S. J. Clarke Publishing Co.
- Sperlin, O.B. (1917), "Washington Forts of the Fur Trade Regime", The Washington Historical Quarterly, 8 (2), University of Washington: 103–113
- Watson, Bruce M. (2010), Lives Lived West of the Divide: A Biographical Dictionary of Fur Traders Working West of the Rockies, 1793-1858, Okanagan: The Centre for Social, Spatial and Economic Justice of the University of British Columbia
