= Joseph Borst House =

Historic house in Centralia, Washington

- U.S. National Register of Historic Places
- Washington State Heritage Register
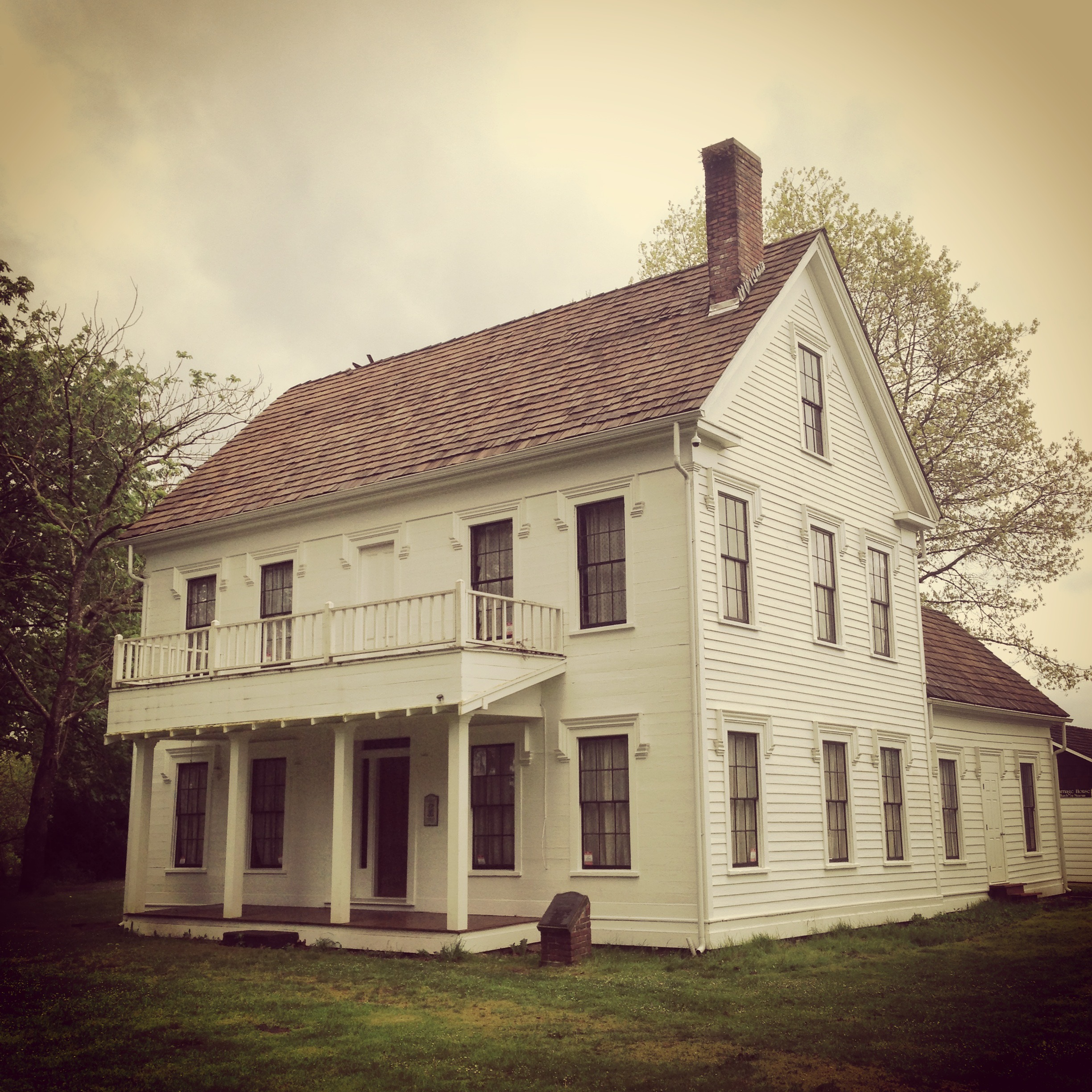
- Joseph Borst House, 2012

- Location within Washington (state)
- Location: 302 Bryden Avenue, Centralia, Washington
- Coordinates: 46°43′11.3″N 122°59′0.4″W
- Area: less than one acre
- Built: 1856
- Architect: Jacob Ort
- Architectural style: Greek Revival
- NRHP reference No.: 77001345

Significant dates
- Added to NRHP: December 27, 1977
- Designated WSHR: December 27, 1977

The Joseph Borst House is an historic residence located in Centralia, Washington at the confluence of the Chehalis and Skookumchuck rivers. The home was listed on the National Register of Historic Places (NRHP) in 1977.

The 2 1/2-story, Greek Revival home was constructed beginning in 1856 for Joseph Borst and family, early pioneers in the Chehalis Valley and present-day Centralia. The Borst's built up their homestead to include a blockhouse, ferry, hotel, store, and an early school. A barn, noted for its size, was built in 1861 and remained operational until it was demolished in 1969 due to weather damage.

The family lived on the grounds into the early 1900s. The home and surrounding land was purchased by the city in two separate transactions in the 1920s and 1950s. Further acreage was given to Centralia for use as a park, donated by Borst descendants. The city attempted to sell the home in 1955 but due to community protest, the building was saved and became part of the Fort Borst Park complex, remaining under Centralia ownership. Outside of the Borst House, no original outbuildings remain on the grounds.

The Borst residence is mostly unaltered and noted for architectural features such as a large front porch and balcony, original clapboard siding, and Gothic Revival window casements. A kitchen addition matches the main structure. The interior layout is simple, containing a steep staircase with noticeable wear and tear after decades of use. Notable details include a large soapstone fireplace, opulent marble baseboards in the parlor, and original woodwork. The home has been a public historic site and museum since the late-1980s, overseen by volunteer efforts. Several personal items from the Borst family are displayed in the house.

The grounds contain an arboretum, remnants of a children's graveyard, and several monuments and plaques. A pioneer replica village, containing a church, one-room schoolhouse, and an interactive museum, was begun in the 1990s and expanded in the early 21st century.

== History ==
=== Construction and early residence ===
The historic pioneer home of the Borst family was completed approximately in 1857 or 1858 on a 640-acre (260 ha) Donation Land Claim. Built by carpenter Jacob Ort and taking almost two years, other structures were added to the lands, including a barn in 1861. The Borst claim became known as Fort Borst, containing a hotel, store, and warehouse; a school for local children began in 1868. A cable ferry landing existed at the homestead, shuttling people over the Skookumchuck River to continue travels onwards to Tumwater and Olympia over what was then called Military Road, or the original path of the Cowlitz Trail. (Note: The ferry was reported as being government owned. A 2 foot (0.61 metres)-wide post, anchored near the blockhouse, was listed as remaining by 1914.) Prior to the American Civil War, Ulysses S. Grant and first governor of the Washington Territory, Isaac Stevens dined at the Borst home. Additional visitors included other military men of note, including George A. Custer, Phillip Sheridan and William T. Sherman.

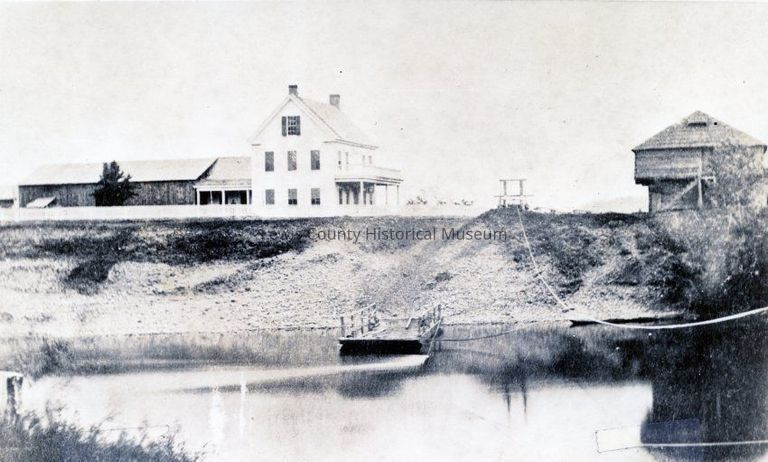
Borst House with barn, blockhouse, and ferry landing, pre-1900

Several myths exist about the construction and purpose of the historic home. One legend states that Joseph, after his wife Mary Adeline accepted his offer of marriage, pledged to build her a large, white mansion. Another story mentions that Mary would only agree to a wedding engagement if a promise of a grand home was offered first. An additional narrative states that the house was constructed to give Mary a sense of permanence after her and her family moved often in her youth. Documentation supports that Joseph began construction in late-1856, the family living in a blockhouse on the grounds in the interim. Known as the Fort Borst Blockhouse, the fortification was built in 1856. The Borsts later moved into what was known as the "Coats Store", a relocated, fully inventoried merchandise store next to the blockhouse; Joseph purchased the building in nearby Skookumchuck. The mansion, after completion, was declared "one of the most handsome along the road from Vancouver to Steilacoom.

=== 20th century and historical preservation ===
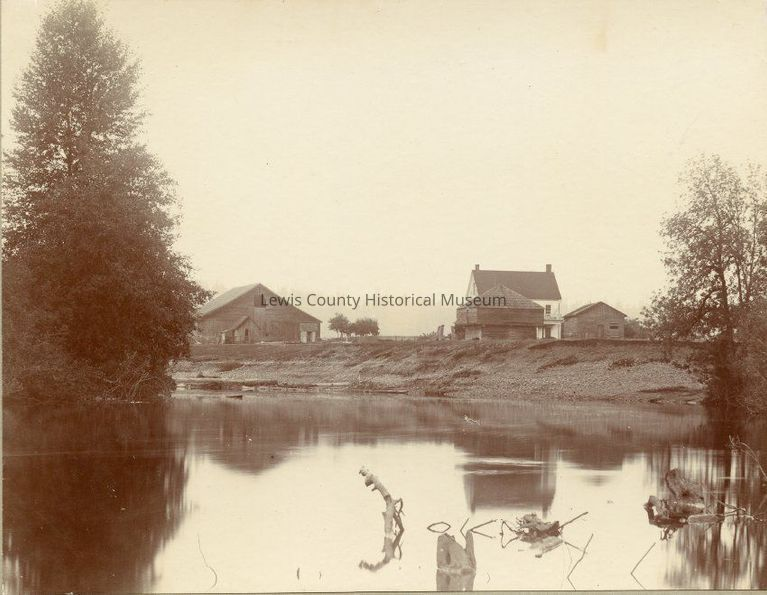
Chehalis River and Borst House with barn and blockhouse, pre-1900

The grounds of the Borst homestead was used as an airport in the early 1900s. The first such airstrip in the county, aircraft no longer used the Borst property after the 1928 opening of the Chehalis–Centralia Airport. A racecar track, which also served as an equestrian center, existed on the property until 1965.

By 1915, the Coats Store had been demolished and the hotel moved into the city for use as a residence. The city of Centralia purchased the Borst house and a surrounding 15 acres (6.1 ha) in 1921 for $30,000; (Note: Additional sources mention the cost of the 1921 Borst House purchase as $20,000.) the family was allowed to continue to live at the home. After their children grew into adulthood, Joseph and Mary Borst moved into another extravagant home in Centralia, leasing the original homestead during their retirement. One of their sons donated 100 acres (40 ha) of the land claim to the city of Centralia in 1922, the grounds becoming Fort Borst Park.

By the 1950s, both the historic home and barn were reported to be either in excellent condition or in disrepair. In July 1953, the city outright purchased the home and another 26 acres (11 ha) surrounding the residence for $20,000. By October, the house and grounds were being considered as a location for a county museum and "historical center".

In February 1955, the city proposed selling the property in full for $20,000. (Note: The attempts to sell the Borst homestead in 1955 led to offers reaching no higher than $22,000.) The grounds were planned to be converted into a new neighborhood. Protests followed which led to a March open house after the city created a public ballot to determine the sale of the home; the event attracted more than 1,200 people. A public vote saved the Borst site by a 3-to-1 ratio; despite the vote, the house and outbuildings were reported to remain in poor shape.

Since the 1955 purchase, the home remained unchanged and the city provided standard maintenance. Restoration fundraising efforts were begun in March 1963 to repair damages caused by the Columbus Day storm of 1962. By June, only $400 of the necessary $3,000 had been raised. The barn, massive in size (Note: No official measurements of the Borst barn have been found.) and admired within the region, was used to house grain and livestock. The outbuilding remained in working order until it was condemned, finally demolished in November 1969 due to severe, irreparable damages from the Columbus Day storm. Pieces of the structure were sold to raise money for the city's park department. (Note: The initial round to sell portions of the Borst barn netted under $300.) At the time of the Borst House's addition to the National Register of Historic Places, no outbuildings remained on the property.

Throughout the 1960s and 1970s, the home was used as a caretaker residence; by 1983, the house was occupied by the city's parks and recreation director. In the late 1980s, Centralia began efforts to protect the home as an historic site. Management and upkeep fell mostly on volunteer efforts. Despite the historical nature of the Joseph Borst House, vandalism remained a threat into the next century and 2010s.

=== Joseph Borst and family ===
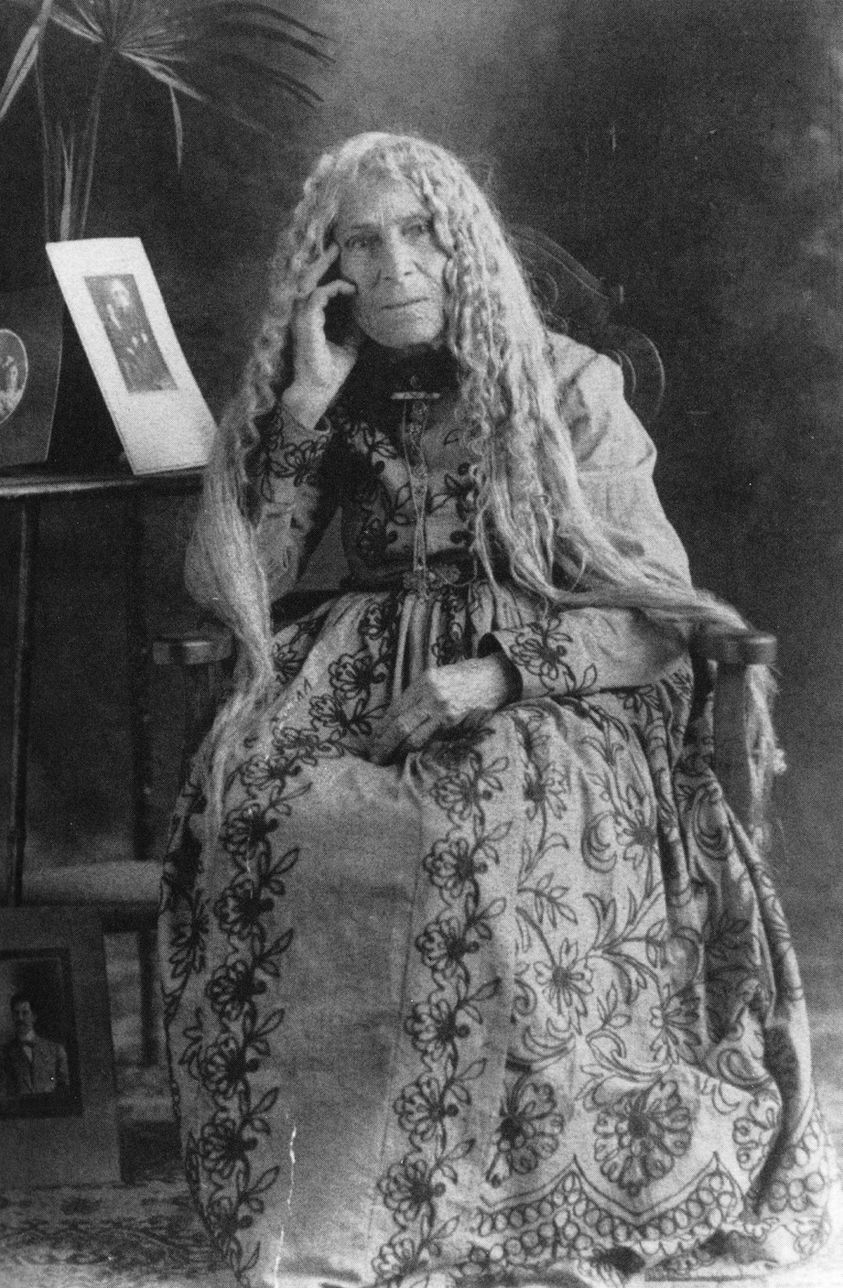
Mary Borst, 1913

Joseph Borst, and his wife Mary Adeline (Roundtree), were among the earliest non-indigenous settlers in the Chehalis Valley. Joseph was born in 1822 in Schoharie County, New York, migrating to what was then the Oregon Territory in 1845 along with Judge Sidney Ford and family, of Fords Prairie note. After building a small cabin on Ford's claim, he served in a militia after the Whitman Massacre and temporarily prospected for gold in California and British Columbia between 1848 and 1851. He returned to the valley in 1851. Mary Adeline and her family settled in Gray's Harbor after they began a trail journey from Illinois in 1852.

The two met in 1854 after Joseph came to the Roundtree's homestead and sawmill on the Black River looking to purchase lumber. They married later that same year, settling in Joseph's original cabin on his 320-acre (130 ha) claim. In 1855, the Borst's and their first daughter moved to Fort Henness in Grand Mound during the Puget Sound War; they stayed for approximately 16 months. During their stay, Joseph had the historic Fort Borst Blockhouse constructed for $500, originally as use to store grain. (Note: Mary Borst gave birth to their second daughter, Ada, while living in the blockhouse.) The blockhouse has been moved several times due to concerns over the changing course of the Chehalis and Skookumchuck rivers; the first relocation was in 1915. For brief times the structure was located off the Borst claim and within Centralia. It was permanently moved back to the land claim as part of Fort Borst Park.

The Borst's eventually had a total of nine children and their landholdings grew to encompass hundreds of acres in such locales as Adna, the valley in Boistfort, and as far away as Ellensburg. Joseph died on October 29, 1885; Mary followed decades later on February 12, 1920, at the age of 81.

== Geography ==
The Joseph Borst House is situated on a flat parcel on the north bank of the Chehalis River in the community of Fords Prairie. The home is also directly west of the river's junction with the Skookumchuck River. The land is considered to be a part of the city of Centralia. A 100-acre (40 ha) remnant of the Borst land claim is used as Fort Borst Park, with the house and detached structures part of the recreational site. The homestead was located on the Cowlitz Trail and was a stop for travelers during early settler migration.

The home, at times referred to as a mansion, is located on Bryden Avenue and the main entrance faces east. The Chehalis River is located directly south with a modern-type detached garage and sheds located to the rear of the home. A metal maintenance shed, at a further distance to the west, is situated on grounds that once contained the Borst barn.

== Architecture and features ==
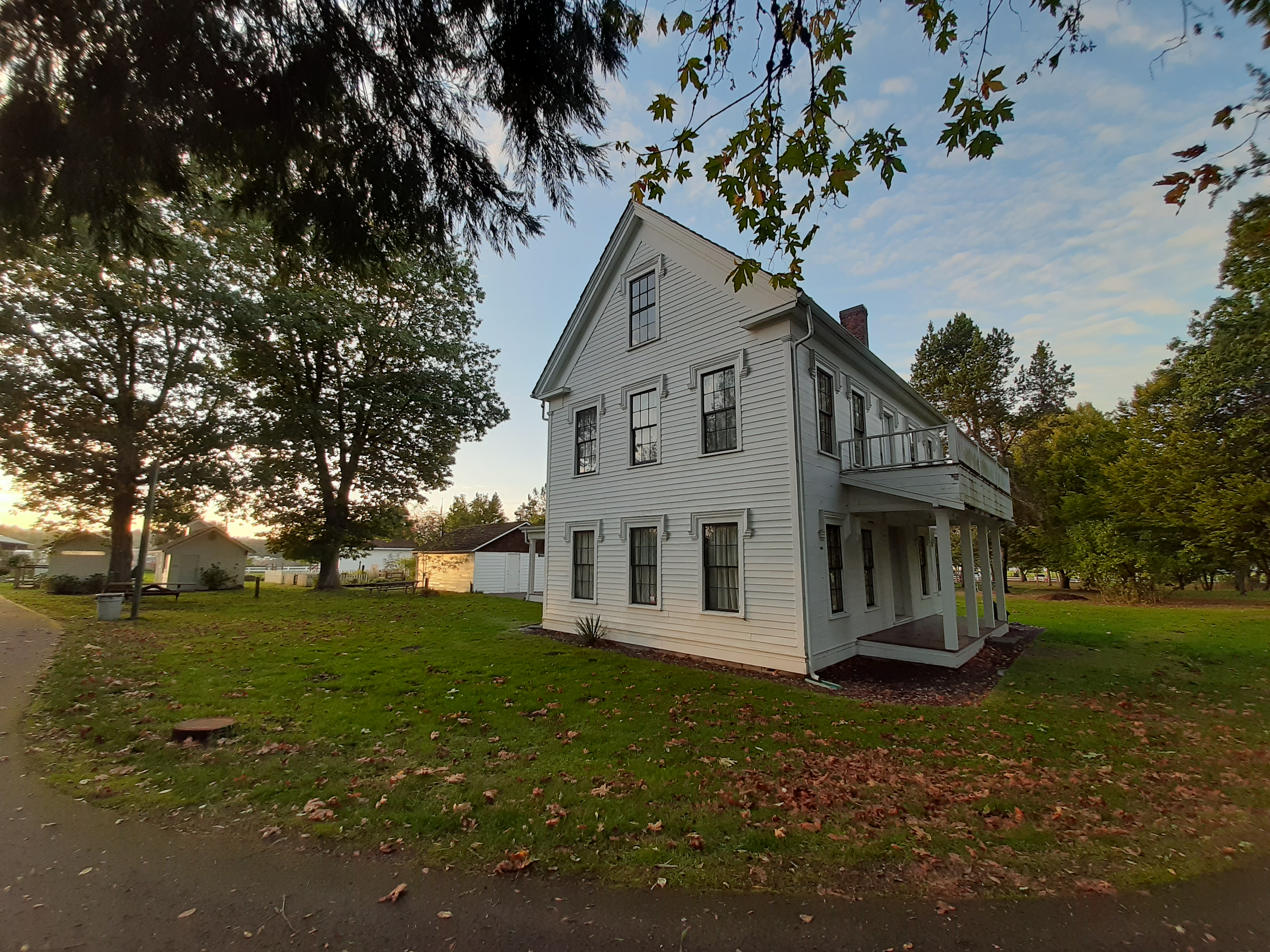
Southeast corner and grounds, 2020

Unless otherwise noted, the details provided are based on the 1977 National Register of Historic Places (NRHP) nomination form and may not reflect updates or changes to the Joseph Borst House in the interim.

The Joseph Borst House is a 2 1/2, wood-frame residence. A 1 1/2 kitchen addition sits to the rear, or west side, of the home. The gable roof over the original core is steeply pitched, oriented in a north-to-south direction. Timber posts, hewed, make up the foundation. The home is considered to be styled in Greek Revival architecture.

=== Exterior ===
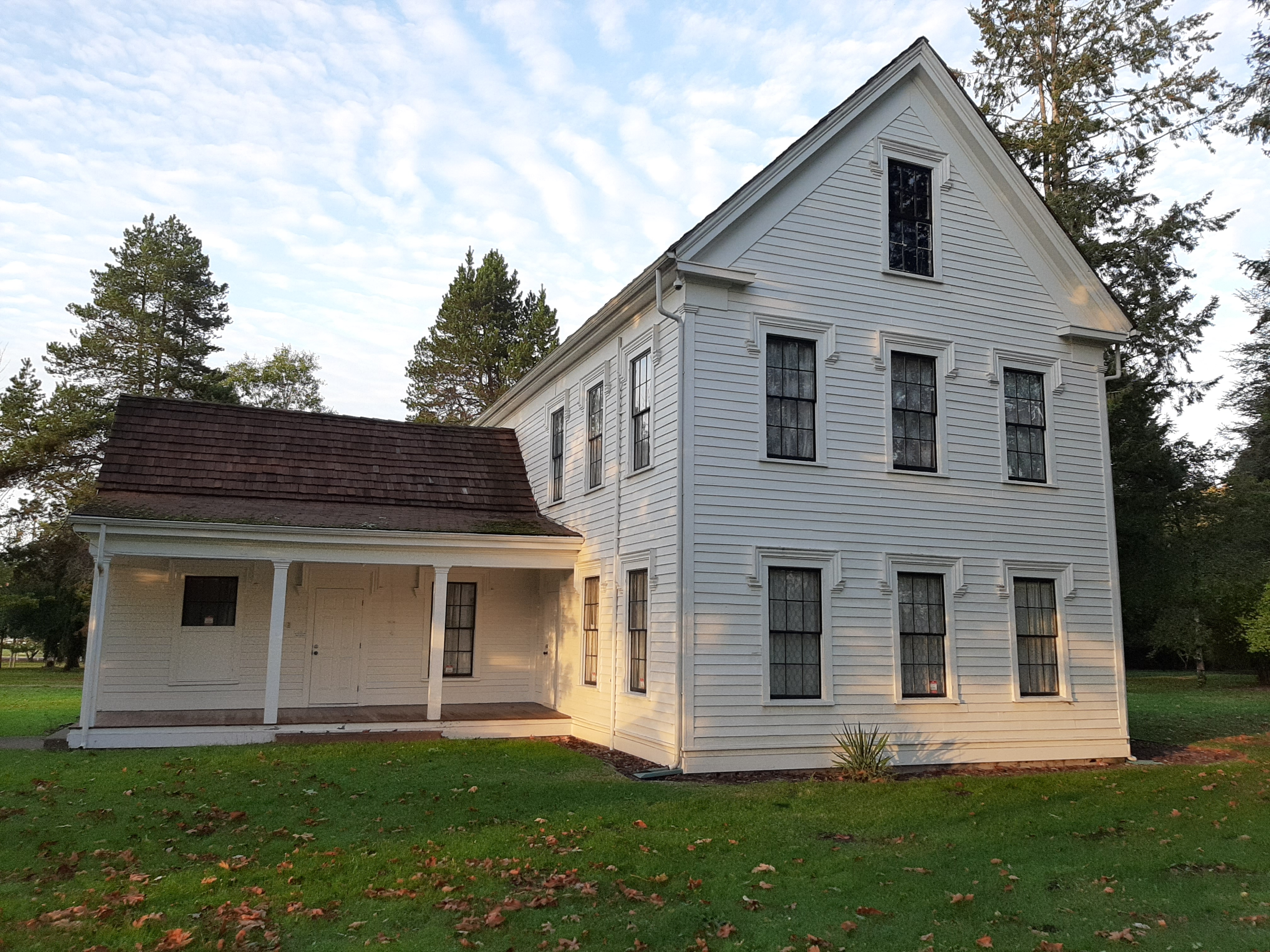
Kitchen addition and side entrance, 2020

The exterior is sheathed in 1 in (2.5 cm) thick fir planks, oriented vertically. Installed with wooden pegs, original flush-board siding protects the front and east portions of the exterior walls. Clapboard siding, consider most likely to be non-original, exists on the remaining sides and rear, as well as the kitchen addition. Ends of the siding and corner boards were reported to have been dipped in white, lead paint to ensure protection against water intrusion and rot. The exterior is known for its white paint and green trim.

The chief carpenter was Jacob Ort, a German settler. A Danish man, whose name is now unknown, was responsible for the interior carpentry. Timber for the construction was sourced from Tumwater; window casings and hardware were reported to come from San Francisco.

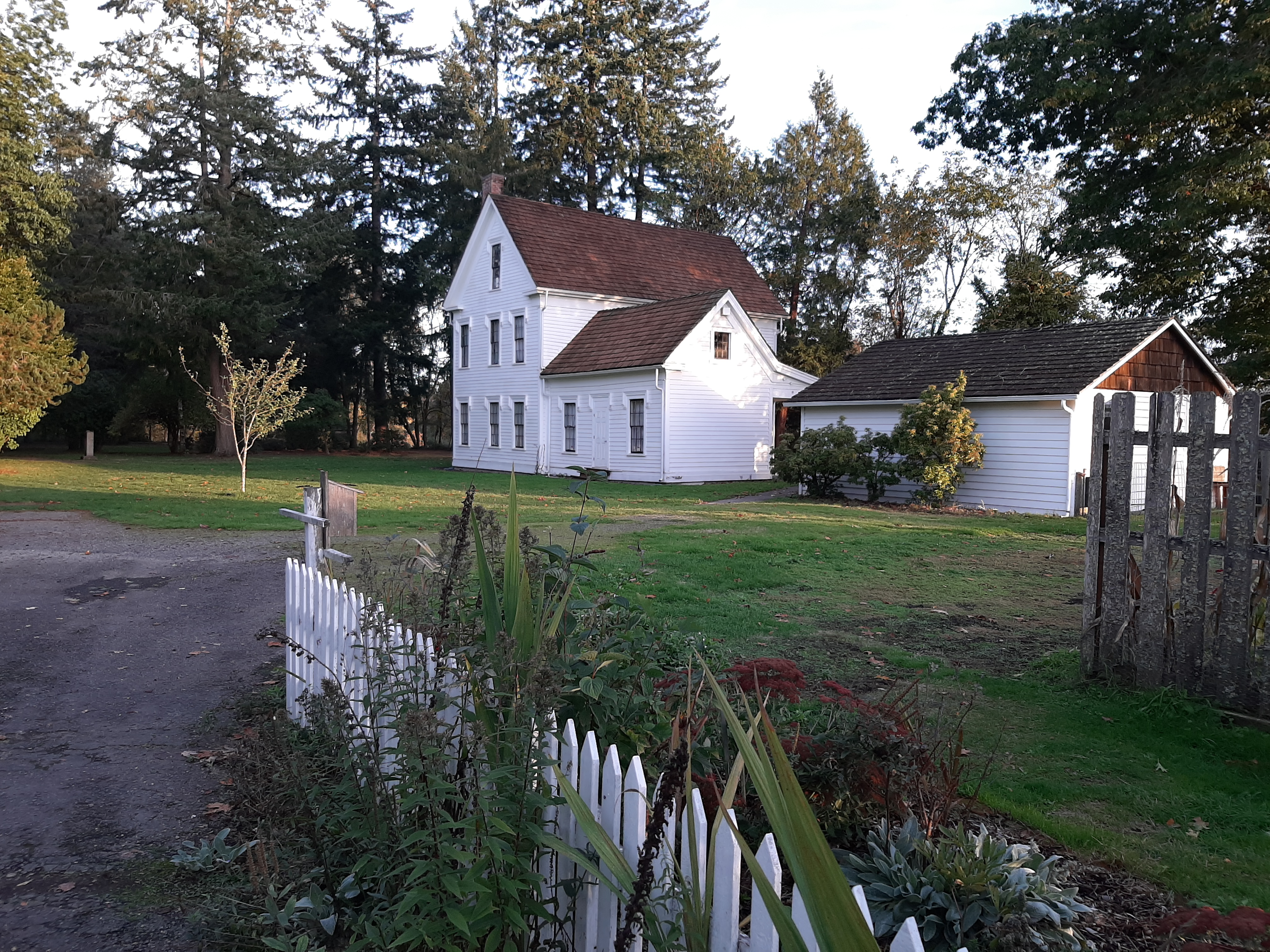
Rear view, garage and garden, 2020

Notable features include trimmed box cornices with returns and corner boards with pilaster caps. An extensive frieze at the soffit is trimmed in molding and according to the NRHP form, provides added "dignity and style to the mansion". The most prominent feature is the shed roof front porch. Originally a much larger balcony, it was altered by Borst's grandson, Joseph, in the 1930s; the alteration is suspected due to deterioration. The covered porch is supported by square posts to house a triangular entablature and a second-story balustrade deck. A similar, but smaller type porch is located at the kitchen addition entrance though it lacks a second story deck.

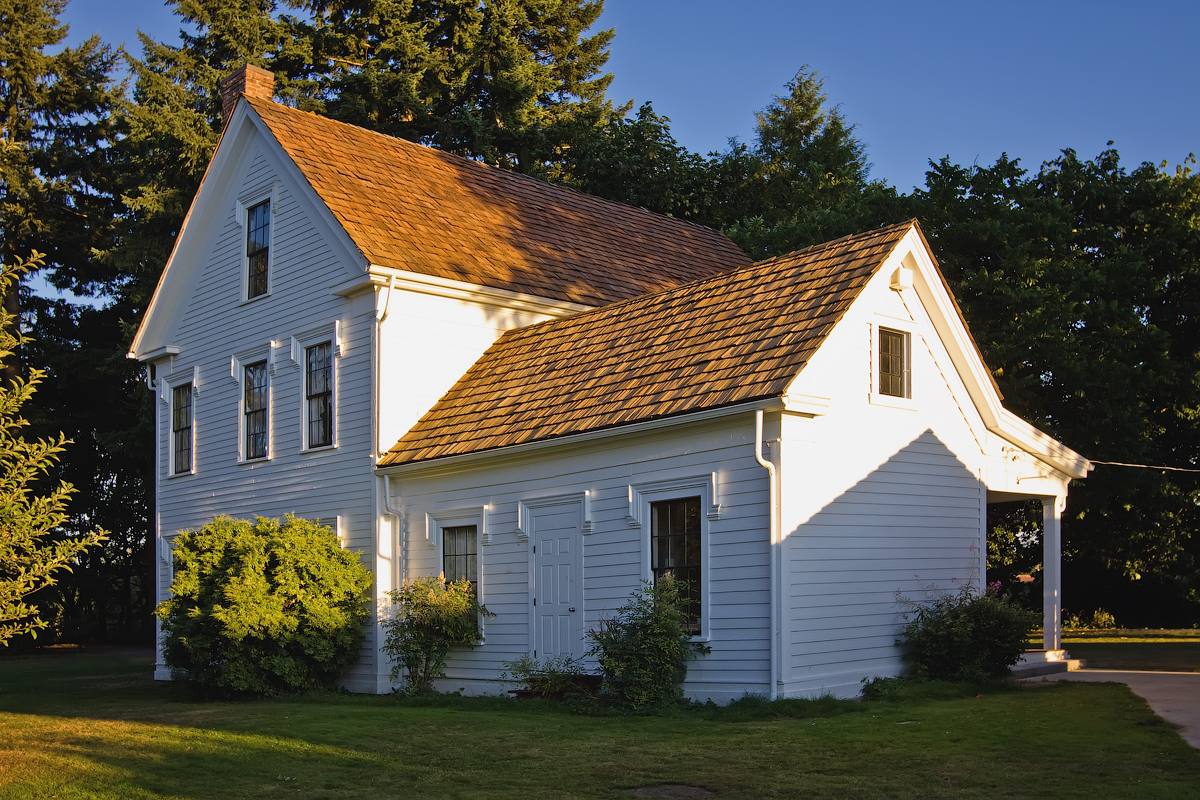
Side view and kitchen wing, 2011

The front door is recessed and is flanked by sidelights and crowned with a transom. Window casements, or fenestrations, are simple, six-over-six sashes; original glazing was still noted at the time of the NRHP nomination. The window style, considered Gothic Revival is consistent around the structure, including the kitchen addition. Once a universal detail on the home, green louver shutters containing cut nails and hand-wrought hinges remained around two windows at the rear of the historic structure.

As of 2013, many of the blown plate glass windows remain, though several have been destroyed due to acts of vandalism. Historic property regulations prevent the city from protecting the casements with plexiglass or other safety coatings.

=== Interior ===
At the time of the historic designation, the interior was considered to be mostly unaltered with exception of minor alterations. Wear and tear was noted to the stairwell and foyer by the 1950s. The floor plan is simple, with a central hallway for the stairwell and small rooms with tall ceilings in each corner on both floors. Wide plank flooring of original installation remained throughout the house, with some rooms on the first floor updated to modern, 3 in (7.6 cm) tongue and groove flooring.

Walls are plaster, containing horse hair for additional strength, and worked over hand-split cedar lath. Varnished woodwork, such as molding and trim, are almost entirely original and handmade. The grain of the carpentry was considered by the NRHP nomination to be "remarkable" yet "crude", though in an "interesting pattern". Wooden doors throughout the house are grained as well, and are either in a two or four panel style.

A formal parlor was most likely located in the main front room of the Borst home. Due to the era and remote location of the home, the original baseboards in the parlor, red-and-gray veined cream marble, are thought unusual and opulent. A rare alteration in the house is a partitioned dressing room and bath located at the back of the parlor. The stairway, original to the structure, contains thick, circular balusters. A steep staircase projects into a second floor room, providing additional access to the attic.

The kitchen addition was modernized for appliances and plumbing but similar to the house, mostly original to when it was constructed. A main feature of the wing is a dining room with a soapstone fireplace, noted for its methods of construction. The hearth and box were built and molded so that it could not crack. (Note: The NRHP nomination classifies the fireplace as being made of Tenino sandstone.) The shallow fireplace has a projecting chimney with a carved mantle with panels of pilaster details.

Furnishings and personal items of the Borst family were returned to the home beginning with the 1980s restoration efforts. Items include the Borst family bible, chairs, and a cabinet featuring porcelain dishes.

=== Outbuildings ===
As of 2020, residential pumphouses that were installed in the 1960s to provide water for the Borst Park Arboretum remain on the grounds.

==== Borst barn ====
The 1861 barn, for a time the largest structure in the Washington Territory, was built of hand sawn timber up to 1 foot (0.30 metres) thick; boards were joined with wooden pegs. It originally had a shake roof, with cedar support posts anchored 5 feet (1.5 m) deep. The posts were charred at the ends to prevent rot and insect damage. Large enough that a wagon team could turn around in the barn, Borst claimed it was built to last for at least 80 to 85 years.

During the 1962 storm, an entire side was ripped away, exposing numerous antiques that were stored in the barn. Insurance funds paid for a partial dismantling. The barn was briefly considered to be moved and rebuilt in 1964 as a community center, possibly as a home for Evergreen Playhouse. Despite efforts to raise funds to save the building, a council vote in November 1969 sealed the demolition. An editorial in the local Daily Chronicle remarked that the loss was a "poor reflection" upon Centralia and that future generations "will be unable to understand our poor judgment and lack of concern for a unique treasure". Lumber from the barn was used by residents in their own homes.

=== Extinct features ===
Chimneys original to the home had been removed and the front veranda once spanned the length of the main façade. Evidence of the original porch remains in the clapboard and the existence further supported by historic photographs. The green shutters were reported as still existing around the casements by 1953. (Note: Photographs used in local newspapers as late as 1994 show the green shutters continuing to be displayed around the home.)

The original cookstove, recalled as the "envy of the region" contained a hot water reservoir. The Borst property once contained an outhouse.

=== Grounds ===
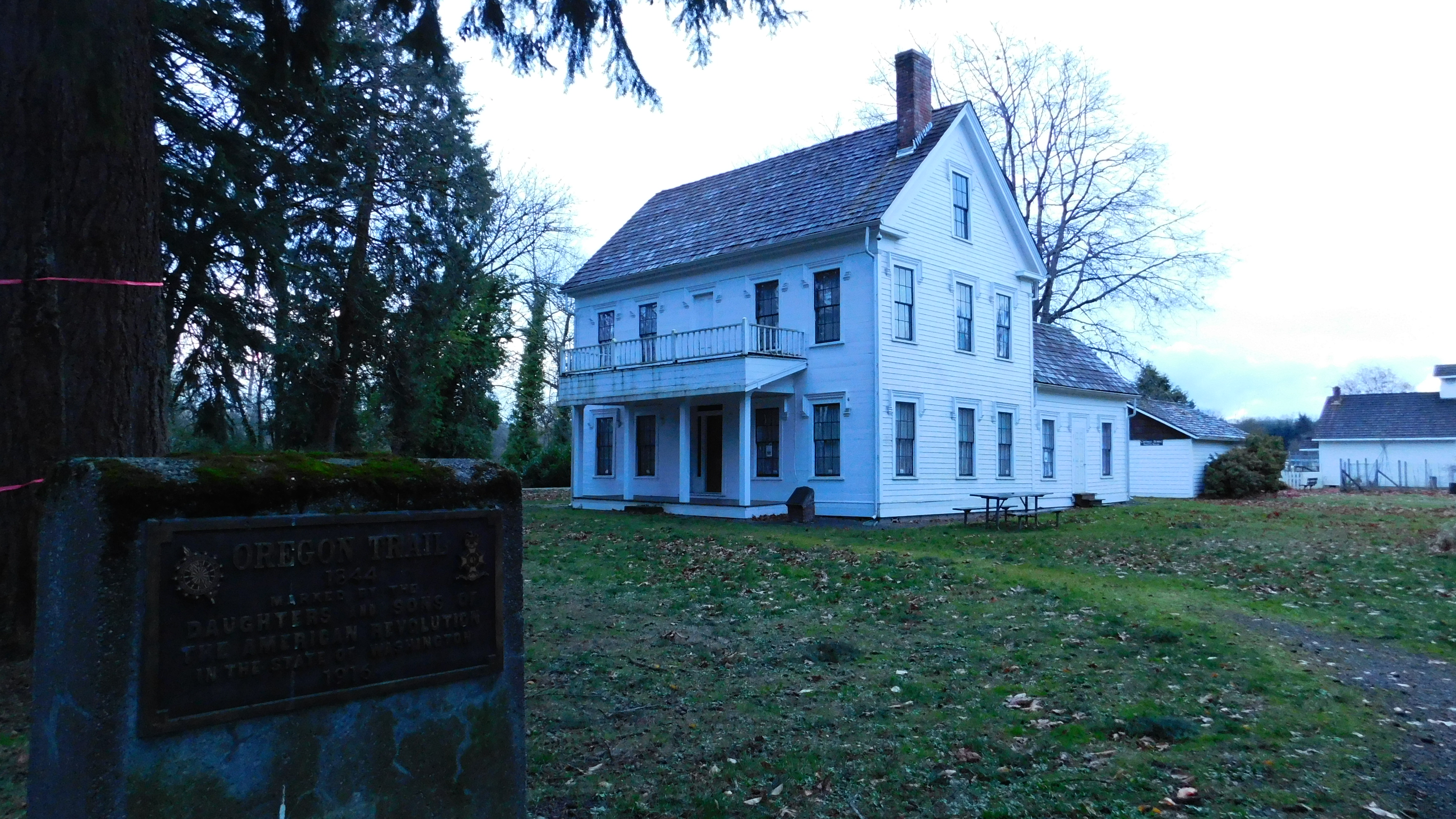
Oregon Trail marker, 2024

A marker for the Oregon Trail was placed on the Borst grounds most likely in 1916. In the ensuing decades, the monument was moved to different locations throughout the city, including within Fort Borst Park. Eventually difficult to locate, the marker was found outside the city's parks department building and relocated back outside of the Borst House in 1994. The monument, one of twelve in Southwest Washington, was refurbished and unveiled during a rededication ceremony in September 2019.

A peach orchard was planted in the 1930s and was reported to span 20 acres (8.1 ha); the orchard was removed after the city purchased the home in 1953. Near the home is an heirloom garden that is under care of volunteers. The gardens contain a variety of fruits, herbs, and vegetables. Several flower beds also reside in the garden area; a gazebo was built over the flower beds in 2005.

Close to the home is a sapling of a 170-year old butternut tree from the Tumwater homestead of pioneer settler, George Bush. It was planted in October 2017.

==== Borst Park Arboretum ====
On the grounds is the Borst Park Arboretum, which began in 1960 by volunteer effort and included the planting of 100 trees of 25 different species from around the world. Meant to connect an open space (Note: An arena once occupied the open space that was the beginning site of the arboretum. The venue was cleared away after a grandstand was lost in a fire.) between the Borst House and the wooded area of Fort Borst Park, the first trees were planted on March 16, 1961. The Fort Borst Arboretum Society officially formed that year. With exceptions for vandalism, each tree is marked with scientific identifiers and if applicable, names of donors and memorialized persons.

The arboretum, for a time, was a teaching site for Centralia College students. Overseen by the society, the 18.5 acres (7.5 ha) site spans from the front door of the carriage house to the Chehalis River. Rhododendrons were planted beginning in 1970; a gift of 1,000 rhododendrons and azaleas for the gardens were accepted by the city in 1986. Between 300 and 500 trees were reported to exist at the arboretum by the mid-1990s.

By the mid-2010s, the site was in a state of disrepair. The rhododendron garden was overgrown to the point where it had been forgotten, but restoration efforts beginning in 2015 by the society helped to uncover plaques and memorials. Improvements to the Borst children's cemetery were undertaken as well. As of 2020, 195 trees are recorded on the arboretum grounds.

==== Cemetery ====
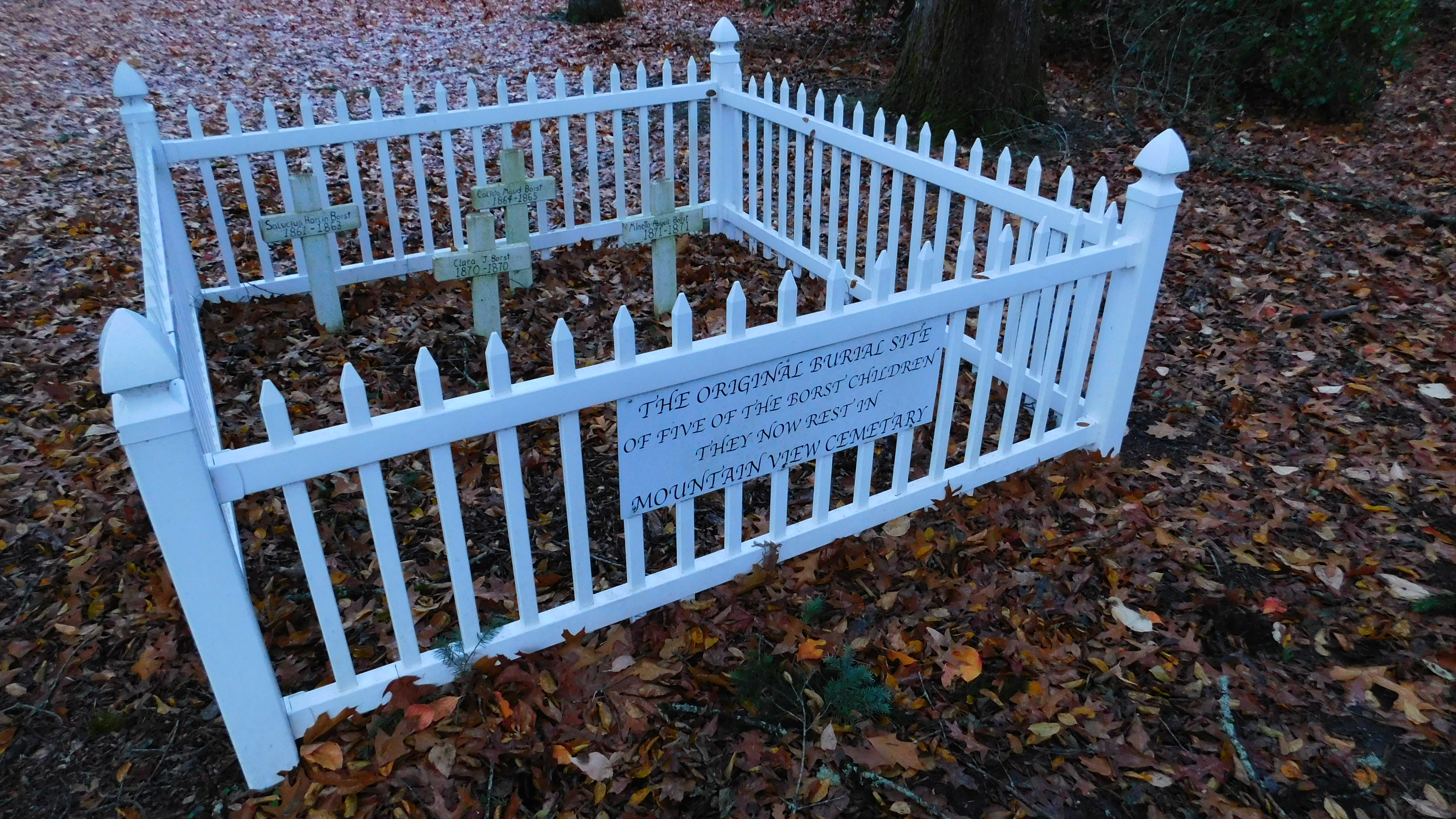
Borst children's cemetery, 2024

A small cemetery is located northeast of the house that once contained the graves of five Borst children. The graveyard was once larger, with several monuments and unmarked graves noted by 1915. A monument, honoring Joseph Borst, stands in what would have been the middle of the larger cemetery area. The children were buried during the 1860s and 1870s, made necessary by a lack of a community cemetery in the area at the time. The remains were moved to nearby Mountain View Cemetery in the early 20th century under Mary Borst's permission, where they have resided since. A white picket fence surrounds the plot, with crosses marking the original placement of Calista, Clara, Menetta, Salucius, and an unnamed child known as Baby Borst.

==== Replica village ====
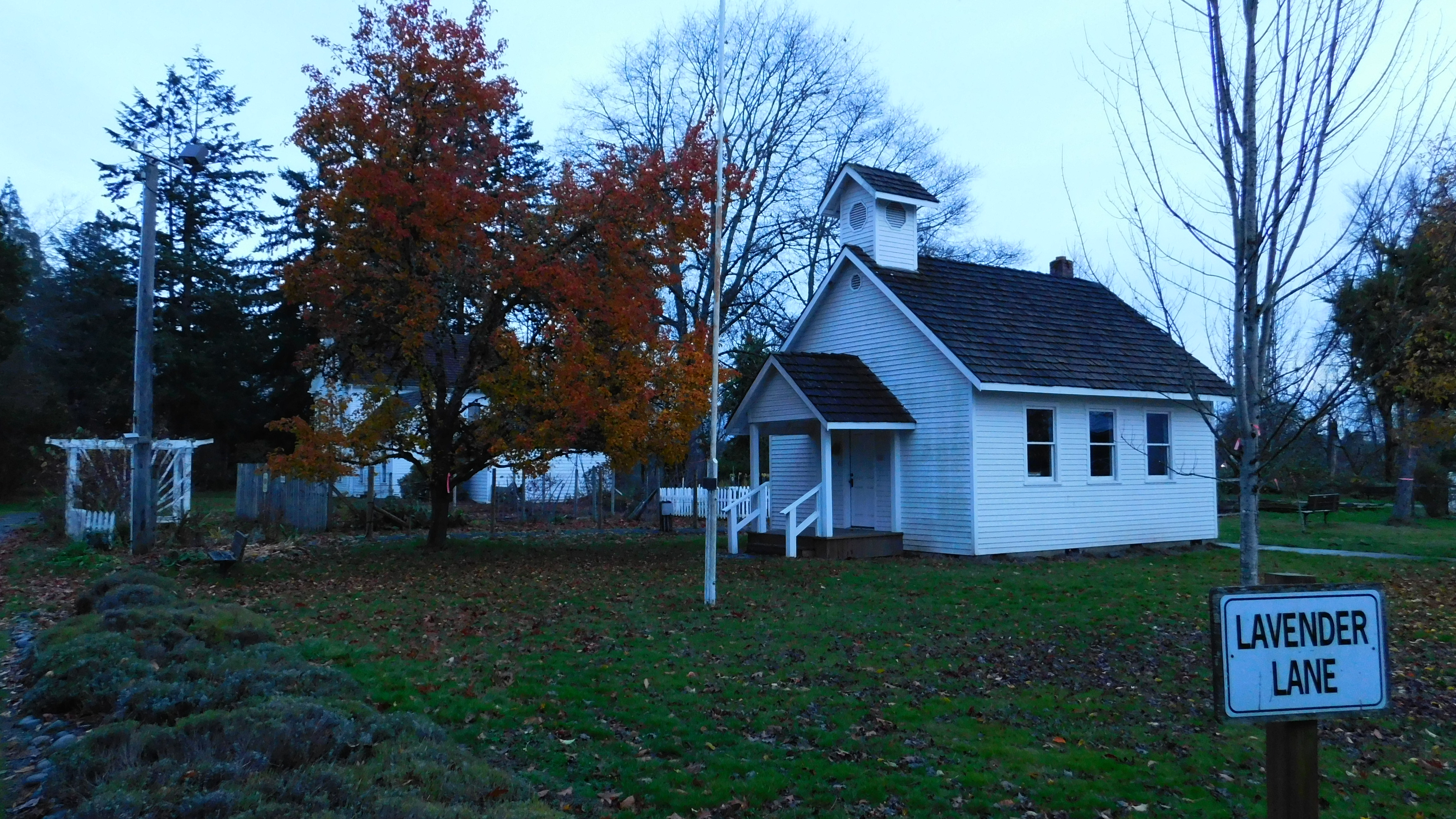
Pioneer Replica Schoolhouse and Lavender Lane, 2024

A volunteer effort created an 1800s village-style site on the Borst House grounds, to the rear of the residence. Known as Pioneer Village Centralia, it started with the build of a one-room schoolhouse in 1995. A carriage house known as the Hands-On Carriage Museum followed in 2012. The museum contains an interactive exhibit and was built using reclaimed lumber from the Borst barn. A pathway, given the moniker Lavender Lane, connects structures in the village.

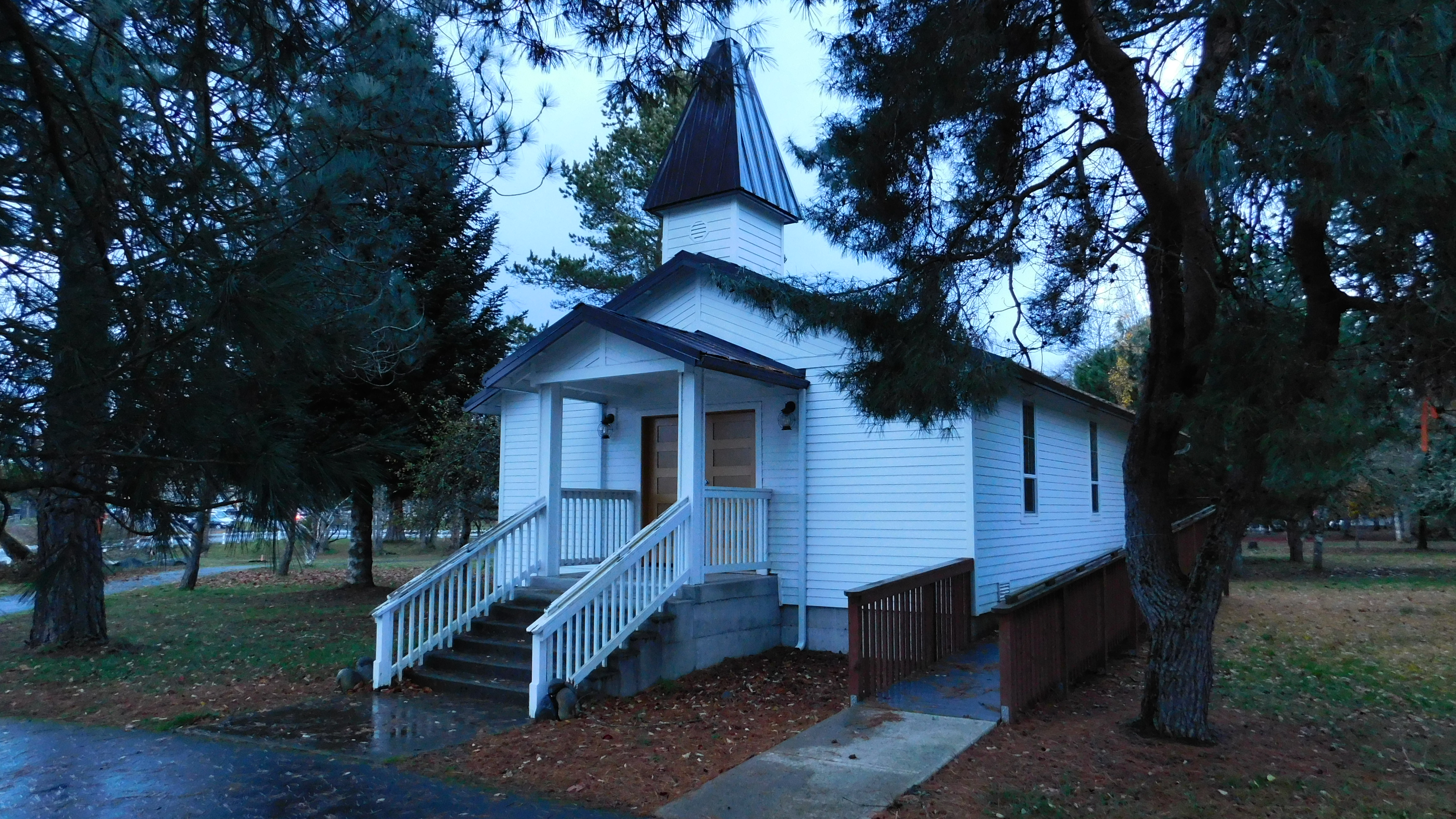
Pioneer Replica Church, 2024

The schoolhouse was begun under the efforts of the Lewis County Retired Teachers Association in cooperation with the Centralia parks department. Construction began in early 1995 and initial costs were estimated at $15,000. The structure features a bell tower with an 1886 bell from a former schoolhouse. The interior was decorated in 1890s fashion, devoid of modern amenities. A dedication to open the school was held in September 1996. Final costs were reported at $22,000, kept low thanks to numerous labor and building material donations. A visitor log book was introduced, allowing people to recount their personal histories of attending a one-room schoolhouse.

Although no church was recorded as having been located on the Borst property, a replica of a church was constructed at the Borst site beginning in 2017 with a dedication held in September 2021. Known as the Replica Pioneer Church at the Borst Home Museum, the house of worship is a copy of a church built by the parents of Mary Borst. Though created by a non-profit, the Borst Pioneer Village Committee, and built by volunteer efforts and numerous local donations, the church is owned by the city and is of use as a rental facility for events.

=== Renovations and restorations ===
The roof of the home was renovated after 1953 to include wood shake shingles.

== Tourism ==
The Borst House was first open for public tours in 1986. Overseen by volunteers, the site's tourist availability has been mostly continuous with closure exceptions for maintenance or remodeling efforts. Tours are free but days and hours are limited, occurring one Saturday every month. Museum volunteers play the part of Borst family members or an aggregate of early pioneers, dressing in period clothing.

Carriages that were housed in the original carriage house were returned to the city in 2011. The horse-drawn transports, a hack and a hearse, had been stored at the Lewis County Historical Museum. The two carriages were stored as surplus by Centralia until 2017, donating the items back to the museum.

The Borst House was featured in the 1999 independent movie, The Immigrant Garden.

== Significance ==
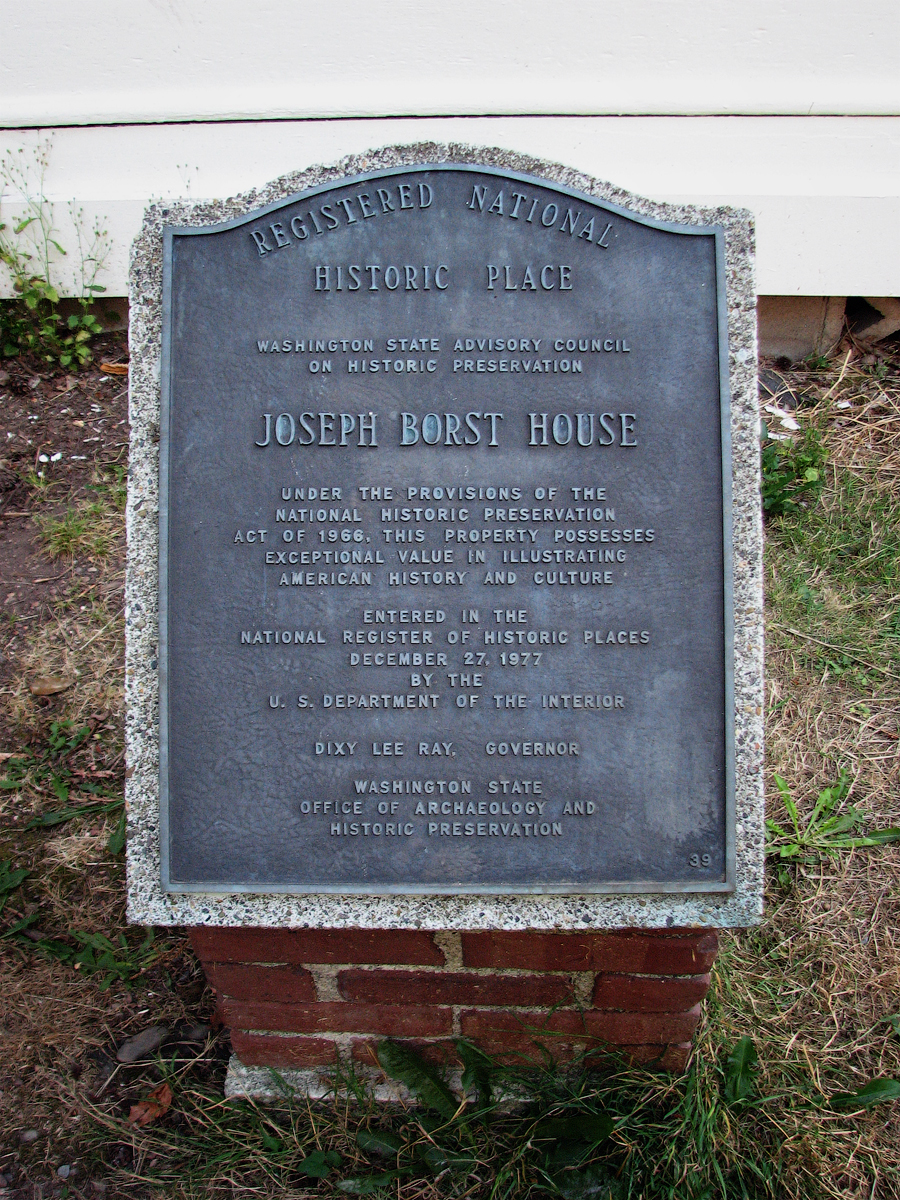
Borst House NRHP plaque

The Joseph Borst House was added to the National Register of Historic Places and Washington State Heritage Register on December 27, 1977. The NRHP considered the home's architectural style to be a "finely-detailed example" of Greek Revivalism, an unusual style in the region at the time. Additionally, the residence showcased variations in architectural details common, or of fashion, to the local community during the time of its construction. Noted for its construction during the mid-1850s regional uprisings of Native American people, the home was also recognized for its spaciousness, structural design, and "attention to refinements of style and detail". The nomination declared the building's architecture to be an embodiment of the mindset of settlers and pioneers to "civilize", soften, and stabilize the wilderness quality of the Washington Territory" during the age.
