= National Register of Historic Places listings in Screven County, Georgia =

Location of Screven County in Georgia

This is a list of properties and districts in Screven County, Georgia that are listed on the National Register of Historic Places (NRHP).

This National Park Service list is complete through NPS recent listings posted April 24, 2026.

== Current listings ==
	Name on the Register	Image	Date listed	Location	City or town	Description
1	Brier Creek Battlefield	Brier Creek Battlefield	January 27, 2020 (#100004899)	Brannens Bridge Rd. one mile south of Old River; 32°48′42″N 81°28′58″W	Sylvania vicinity	
2	Georgia Welcome Center	Georgia Welcome Center	December 29, 2011 (#11000959)	8463 U.S. 301/Burton's Ferry Highway; 32°56′16″N 81°31′02″W	Sylvania	Dedicated in January 1962, this was the first welcome center in Georgia. It is reportedly the oldest roadside welcome center in the U.S. that is still in use.
3	Harris-Murrow-Trowell House	Harris-Murrow-Trowell House	March 30, 2009 (#09000187)	473 Old Louisville Road; 32°31′04″N 81°31′49″W	Oliver	Built ca. 1888
4	Seaborn Goodall House	Seaborn Goodall House	October 17, 1977 (#77000443)	North of Sylvania at junction of U.S. 301 and GA 24; 32°49′37″N 81°37′29″W	Sylvania	Built in 1815; now owned by the D.A.R. website
5	Samuel Shepard Lines House		July 14, 1983 (#83000240)	Northeast of Sylvania, 17809 Sunburst Rd; 32°56′15″N 81°35′43″W	Sylvania	Destroyed by fire in 1986
