= Georgia State Route 73 =

State highway in Georgia, United States

State Route 73
- Georgia State Route 73; mainline in red, bannered routes in blue

Route information
- Maintained by GDOT
- Length: 77.96 mi (125.46 km)
- Existed: 1931–present

Major junctions
- South end: US 25 / US 301 / SR 23 / SR 57 / SR 144 in Glennville
- US 280 / SR 30 / SR 129 in Claxton; I-16 near Register; US 25 / US 80 / SR 26 / SR 67 in Statesboro
- North end: US 301 at the South Carolina state line east of Millhaven

Location
- Country: United States
- State: Georgia
- Counties: Tattnall, Evans, Bulloch, Screven

Highway system
- Georgia State Highway System; Interstate; US; State; Special
← SR 72	→ SR 73W

State Route 73 (SR 73) is a 77.96-mile-long (125.46 km) state highway in the eastern part of the U.S. state of Georgia. It connects Glennville with the South Carolina state line, via Claxton, Statesboro, Dover, and Sylvania. Except for a brief portion in the Sylvania area, it is completely concurrent with U.S. Route 301 (US 301). Its southern terminus is at US 25/US 301/SR 23/SR 57 and SR 144 in Glennville. Its northern terminus is at the South Carolina state line, east of Millhaven, where US 301 enters that state.

== Route description ==
=== Tattnall County ===
SR 73 begins concurrent with US 25/US 301 (Veterans Boulevard) at an intersection with SR 144 (Barnard Street) in Glennville, within the southeastern part of Tattnall County. This intersection is the northern end of the concurrency of US 25/US 301 with SR 23/SR 57. Here, US 25, US 301, and SR 73 travel to the north-northeast, through a mostly commercial area. Just before an intersection with the eastern terminus of Cloverdale Road, they begin a curve to the north-northwest. They leave the city limits of Glennville and curve back to the north-northeast. They cross over Beards Creek just before passing Smith State Prison. They intersect the southern terminus of Hugh Driggers Road and the western terminus of Bird Ford Lake Road, the latter of which leads to the Smith State Prison Training Center. The concurrency meets what was the southern terminus of former SR 250 just before traveling through Gooseneck. The three highways pass Groover Pond and then enter the south-central part of Evans County.

=== Evans County ===
US 25, US 301, and SR 73 cross over Grice Creek and then enter the community of Deans Crossing. There, they intersect the eastern terminus of Bay Branch Church Road and the western terminus of Green Cypress Church Road, the latter of which leads to Evans County Landfill. Just past this community, they pass Evans County Fire Rescue Station No. 5. After they pass Dyess Pond, they cross over Bull Creek. The three highways curve back to the north-northwest and pass Richards Pond. Then, they curve to a nearly due north direction. They pass Claxton Elementary School just before entering Claxton, where it is known as South Duval Street and is also known as Norman W. Fries Memorial Highway. In downtown, they cross over some railroad tracks of Georgia Central Railway and then intersect US 280/SR 30/SR 129 (Main Street, also known as Albert Parker Highway). Here, the concurrency becomes known as North Duval Street. Just south of an intersection with the eastern terminus of MLK Jr. Drive and the western terminus of East Long Street, they begin a curve to the northeast. At the northern end of this curve, they leave the city limits of Claxton. They pass Smith Transitional Center, the Women's Probation Detention Center, and the Evans County Maintenance Facility, before intersecting the northern terminus of an entrance road to the Claxton Poultry Farms. They pass Rocks River Park just before crossing over the Canoochee River on the Earnest W. Strickland Memorial Bridge. After passing the Claxton–Evans County Airport, US 25, US 301, and SR 73 curve to the north-northwest. Just after curving back to the north-northeast, they pass Lewis Pond and cross over Rocky Branch. After passing Beasley Pond and crossing over Thick Creek, the highways curve to the north. They intersect the northern terminus of SR 169 and the southern terminus of Caddie Green Road. They pass Oliffs Pond. After curving back to the north-northeast, they enter Bulloch County.

=== Bulloch County ===
US 25, US 301, and SR 73 immediately curve back to the north-northwest and cross over Scott Creek. After curving back to the north-northeast, they pass Nevils Pond. They curve back to the north-northwest and have an interchange with Interstate 16 (I-16; Jim Gillis Highway). The concurrency becomes known as Jones Lane Memorial Highway. The three highways curve back to the north-northeast and then intersect SR 46. After curving to the northeast, they cross over Lotts Creek and then begin paralleling some railroad tracks of Norfolk Southern Railway (NS). They pass East Georgia State College's Statesboro campus, a Georgia State Patrol post, and Ogeechee Technical College just before entering Statesboro. Immediately after entering the city limits, they intersect SR 67 Byp., as well as the southern terminus of US 25 Byp., US 301 Byp., and SR 73 Byp. (Veterans Memorial Parkway). They intersect the eastern terminus of Rucker Lane and the western terminus of Old Register Road, the latter of which leads to Georgia Southern University (GSU). A short distance later, they meet the northern terminus of Parrish Drive, which also leads to GSU. Just before the intersection with the southern terminus of Azalea Drive, the three highways curve to the north-northeast. At this intersection, they begin paralleling the eastern edge of W. Jones Lane Memorial Park. They intersect the northern terminus of Southern Drive, which is the last access road for GSU. They cross over Beautiful Eagle Creek and then intersect Tillman Road. Here, they leave the memorial park and enter downtown Statesboro. They cross over Little Lotts Creek and then over the NS railroad line they were paralleling. Then, they intersect SR 67 (Fair Road), which joins the concurrency. The four highways intersect Grady Street, which leads to the city's police and fire departments. Just north of this intersection, they pass the Statesboro–Bulloch County Library. An intersection with the eastern terminus of Bulloch Street leads to the Statesboro–Bulloch County Recycling Center. An intersection with the eastern terminus of West Main Street and the western terminus of East Main Street leads to Averitt Arts Center. On the northeastern corner of this intersection is the Bulloch County Courthouse. Just south of an intersection with the eastern terminus of Elm Street, the concurrency curves to the north-northwest. They intersect US 80/SR 26 (Northside Drive). Here, US 25 and SR 67 depart the concurrency to the left. At an intersection with Parrish Street, US 301 and SR 73 turn right and travel to the east-northeast and make a very gradual curve to the northeast. Just before an intersection with the southern terminus of Mathews Road, they cross over the NS railroad line. They intersect the northern terminus of US 301 Byp./SR 73 Byp. (Veterans Memorial Parkway), which leads to Willingway Hospital. This intersection is immediately before the highways leave Statesboro. They cross over Mill Creek then curve to the north-northeast. They intersect the eastern terminus of Holland Industrial Park and the western terminus of Statesboro Airport Road, the latter of which leads to Statesboro–Bulloch County Airport. They travel through rural areas of the county and cross over the Ogeechee River and enter Screven County.

=== Screven County ===
US 301 and SR 73 become known as the H. Walstein Parker Memorial Highway. They intersect the southern terminus of Dover Road, which leads to Dover. They travel on a bridge over some railroad tracks of Norfolk Southern. In Cooperville, they intersect SR 17. Almost immediately after this intersection, they curve to the north. They begin paralleling Simmons Branch just before curving back to the north-northeast. Just north of an intersection with the eastern terminus of Jackson Branch Road, they leave Simmons Branch. They cross over the South Fork Ogeechee Creek and passes Lee Pond. The two highways travel through Goloid before crossing over Ogeechee Creek. Almost immediately after entering Sylvania, they intersect the southern terminus of Waters Station Road. Here, just one block to the west, is the southern terminus of Frontage Road West, a frontage road for US 301. Just north of Waters Station Road, they begin a curve to the north-northwest. Almost immediately, they intersect SR 21 (Sylvania Bypass), which joins the concurrency. Just past this intersection, SR 73 splits off of US 301 to the east-northeast. This intersection is the southern terminus of SR 73 Loop, which is US 301's companion state highway through most of the Sylvania area. SR 73 takes on the name of West Ogeechee Street. Immediately, SR 73 curves back to the north-northeast. Immediately, it intersects the southern terminus of Frontage Road East, another frontage road for US 301. It passes Bennett Lake and then curves to the east-northeast. It intersects SR 21 Bus. (Mims Road), which leads to Optim Medical Center – Screven. SR 21 Bus. begins a concurrency with SR 73. They intersect the northern terminus of Lewis Place and the southern terminus of South Community Drive, the latter of which leads to Screven County Library. They travel on a bridge over some railroad tracks of Ogeechee Railway. At an intersection with South Main Street, where the city hall of Sylvania is located, SR 21 Bus. splits off to the south-southeast. SR 73 turns left onto North Main Street and travels to the north-northwest. It then curves to the north and crosses over Buck Creek before an intersection with the southern terminus of Habersham Road and the western terminus of Torrington Road. It then meets the northern terminus of Frontage Road East before intersecting US 301 and the northern terminus of SR 73 Loop. Here, US 301 and SR 73 begin their second concurrency. They head to the north and curve to the north-northeast before they cross over Indian Branch. They curve back to the north. After bending back to the north-northwest, they begin a concurrency with SR 24. Immediately, they cross over Beaverdam Creek on the Jacksonboro Bridge. A short distance later, SR 24 splits off from the concurrency to the north-northwest. Then, they curve to the northeast and cross over Brier Creek. They cross over Beaverdam Creek again. They curve to the east-northeast and pass the Georgia Welcome Center. Then, they cross over the Savannah River on the Burton's Ferry Bridge, where US 301 enters South Carolina. At the state line, SR 73 ends.

=== National Highway System ===
The following portions of SR 73 are part of the National Highway System, a system of routes determined to be the most important for the nation's economy, mobility, and defense:

- From I-16, south-southeast of Register, to the northern end of the southern concurrency with US 301, southwest of Sylvania
- The entire length of the northern concurrency with US 301, from the northern part of Sylvania to the South Carolina state line east of Millhaven

== History ==
The roadway that would eventually become SR 73 was established between January 1, 1920, and September 23, 1921, as part of SR 26 southwest of Statesboro. SR 73 was established between November 1930 and January 1932 between US 280/SR 30 in Claxton north-northeast to SR 26 southwest of Statesboro. A northern segment was also established from SR 24 north of Sylvania northeast to the South Carolina state line. The next month, the paths of SR 26 and SR 46 west of Statesboro were swapped. Between November 1932 and May 1933, a central segment of SR 73 was established between US 80/SR 26 in Statesboro and SR 21 in Sylvania. There is no indication as to whether this segment connected to either of the previously established ones. Between April and October 1934, SR 73 was extended south-southwest from Claxton to SR 23 in Glennville. Between September 1938 and July 1939, US 25 was designated on the path of SR 73 from Glennville to southwest of Statesboro and on SR 46 (and possibly SR 73) from this point to Statesboro.

Between November 1946 and February 1948, US 301 was designated on the entire length of each segment of SR 73 (and US 25), and on SR 46 and SR 24 between them. By April 1949, SR 24 was extended to the southeast, with a concurrency with US 301/SR 73 north-northeast of Sylvania. Between June 1963 and January 1966, the path of SR 46 southwest of Statesboro was shifted to the southeast. Its former path, on US 25, was indicated to be part of SR 73. In 1970, SR 73 Loop was designated on its proposed path, with US 301 shifted onto it. US 301's former path was redesignated as US 301 Business (US 301 Bus.).

== Major intersections ==
County	Location	mi	km	Destinations	Notes
Tattnall	Glennville	0.000	0.000	US 25 south / US 301 south (Veterans Boulevard south) / SR 23 / SR 57 (Veterans Boulevard south / Barnard Street west) / SR 144 (Barnard Street) – Reidsville, Baxley, Ludowici, Fort Stewart, Gordonia-Alatamaha State Park & Golf Course, Watermelon Creek Vineyard	Southern terminus; southern end of US 25 and US 301 concurrencies
Tattnall		4.697	7.559	Old Highway 250 north	Southern terminus of Old Highway 250; former SR 250 north
Evans	Claxton	15.644	25.177	US 280 / SR 30 / SR 129 (Main Street / Albert Parker Highway) – Reidsville, Lyons	
Evans	Canoochee River	17.504	28.170	Earnest W. Strickland Memorial Bridge	
Evans		22.006	35.415	SR 169 south / Caddie Green Road north – Bellville	Northern terminus of SR 169; southern terminus of Caddie Green Road
Bulloch		26.346	42.400	I-16 (Jim Gillis Highway / SR 404) – Macon, Savannah	I-16 exit 116
Bulloch		29.982	48.251	SR 46 – Metter, Savannah, Meinhardt Vineyards	
Bulloch	Statesboro	35.439	57.034	US 25 Byp. north / US 301 Byp. north / SR 67 Byp. (Veterans Memorial Parkway / SR 73 Byp. north) – Millen, Sylvania, Paulson Stadium, Georgia Southern University, Magnolia Springs State Park	Southern terminus of US 25 Byp., US 301 Byp., and SR 73 Byp.; provides access to Statesboro–Bulloch County Airport and Willingway Hospital
Bulloch	Statesboro	37.313	60.049	SR 67 south (Fair Road) – Pembroke, Hinesville, Fort Stewart	Southern end of SR 67 concurrency
Bulloch	Statesboro	38.434	61.854	US 25 north / US 80 / SR 67 north (Northside Drive / SR 26) – Swainsboro, Savannah	Northern end of US 25 and SR 67 concurrencies
Bulloch	Statesboro	39.970	64.325	US 301 Byp. south (Veterans Memorial Parkway / SR 73 Byp. south) – Claxton, Georgia Southern University, Ogeechee Technical College	Northern terminus of US 301 Byp. and SR 73 Byp.; provides access to Willingway Hospital
Screven	Cooperville	49.318	79.370	SR 17 – Savannah, Millen	
Screven	Sylvania	59.369	95.545	SR 21 south (Sylvania Bypass) – Savannah	Southern end of SR 21 concurrency
Screven	Sylvania	59.536	95.814	US 301 north / SR 21 north / SR 73 Loop north – Millen	Northern end of US 301 and SR 21 concurrencies; southern terminus of SR 73 Loop
Screven	Sylvania	60.839	97.911	SR 21 Bus. west (Mims Road) – Millen	Southern end of SR 21 Bus. concurrency; provides access to Optim Medical Center – Screven
Screven	Sylvania	61.238– 61.403	98.553– 98.819	SR 21 Bus. east (South Main Street) – Savannah	Northern end of SR 21 Bus. concurrency; roundabout connecting two one-way pairs
Screven	Sylvania	62.401	100.425	US 301 south / SR 73 Loop south – Statesboro, Savannah	Southern end of US 301 concurrency; northern terminus of SR 73 Loop; provides access to Optim Medical Center – Screven
Screven		66.272	106.654	SR 24 east – Newington	Southern end of SR 24 concurrency
Screven	Beaverdam Creek	66.345	106.772	Jacksonboro Bridge	
Screven		66.941	107.731	SR 24 west – Waynesboro, Augusta, Sardis	Northern end of SR 24 concurrency
Savannah River		77.963	125.469	US 301 north – Allendale	Northern terminus; northern end of US 301 concurrency; continuation into South Carolina over Burton's Ferry Bridge
1.000 mi = 1.609 km; 1.000 km = 0.621 mi: Concurrency terminus

== Special routes ==
=== Glennville bypass ===
State Route 73 Bypass
- Location: Glennville, Georgia
- Existed: 1946–1985

State Route 73 Bypass (SR 73 Byp.) was a bypass for SR 73 that partially existed in Glennville. Between the beginning of 1945 and the end of 1946, it was established from SR 144 in the eastern part of the city to US 25/SR 73 north of it. By February 1948, it was extended southwest, west, and west-northwest to US 25/US 301/SR 23 in the southern part of the city. By April 1949, it was truncated to its previous southern terminus. In 1953, the bypass was extended again, this time just slightly to SR 144 Loop. Between June 1963 and the end of 1965, it was truncated again to its original southern terminus. In 1985, the bypass was decommissioned.

The entire route was in Tattnall County.

Location	mi	km	Destinations	Notes
			SR 144	Southern terminus
			SR 23 Conn.	
			US 25 / US 301 / SR 73	Northern terminus
1.000 mi = 1.609 km; 1.000 km = 0.621 mi

=== Statesboro bypass ===
State Route 73 Bypass
- Location: Statesboro, Georgia
- Length: 6.9 mi (11.1 km)
- Existed: 1993–present

State Route 73 Bypass (SR 73 Byp.) is a 6.9-mile-long (11.1 km) four-lane bypass of SR 73. It travels south-to-north in the southern and eastern parts of the city of Statesboro. It is completely concurrent with U.S. Route 301 Bypass (US 301 Byp.) for its entire length. US 301 Byp./SR 73 Byp., along with US 25 Byp. (and SR 67 Byp.), makes up the Veterans Memorial Parkway, which forms a near circle around the southern part of the city. The entire length of SR 73 Byp. is part of the National Highway System, a system of routes determined to be the most important for the nation's economy, mobility, and defense. The Veterans Memorial Parkway was established in 1993.

=== Sylvania loop route ===
State Route 73 Loop
- Location: Sylvania, Georgia
- Length: 3.03 mi (4.88 km)
- Existed: 1970–present

State Route 73 Loop (SR 73 Loop) is a 3.03-mile-long (4.88 km) loop route of SR 73 that exists in the western part of Sylvania. It is completely concurrent with US 301. It is the only special route of SR 73 that is not concurrent with a special route of US 301.

The loop begins concurrent with US 301/SR 21 just southwest of the city limits of Sylvania. This intersection is the northern end of SR 73's southern concurrency with US 301. The three highways travel to the north-northwest, just west of the city. They have a frontage road on the western side of the roadway. A short distance later, a frontage road on the eastern side of the roadway joins it. They pass Screven County Elementary School, with the east frontage road having access to it. They curve to the north-northeast and intersect Rocky Ford Road, which leads to Screven County's agricultural center, public works department, landfill, and prison, as well as a Georgia State Patrol post, the sheriff's department, and Rocky Ford. They meet the western terminus of SR 21 Bus. (Mims Road). At this intersection, SR 21 splits off to the northwest. US 301 and SR 73 Loop then cross over some railroad tracks of Norfolk Southern Railway. They curve to the east-northeast and have an intersection with the northern terminus of Singleton Avenue and the southern terminus of Buttermilk Road. They begin a curve back to the north-northeast and have an intersection with Habersham Road. The eastern frontage road ends before they intersect SR 73 (North Main Street). Here, SR 73 Loop ends, and SR 73 begins its northern concurrency with US 301.

The entire length of SR 73 Loop is part of the National Highway System, a system of routes determined to be the most important for the nation's economy, mobility, and defense.

A central segment of SR 73 was built between US 80/SR 26 in Statesboro and SR 21 in Sylvania between November 1932 and May 1933. Between June 1963 and January 1966, a western bypass of the city, designated as SR 73 Loop, was proposed between two intersections with US 301/SR 73 (one south-southwest of the city and the other north-northwest of it). In 1970, it was established on this path, with US 301 being shifted onto it. US 301's former path through the city (on SR 73) was redesignated as US 301 Business (US 301 Bus.). In 1993, the path of SR 21 in Sylvania was shifted to the southwest, replacing the entire length of SR 829 and on a concurrency with US 301/SR 73 Loop. Its former path was redesignated as SR 21 Bus.

The entire route is in Screven County.

Location	mi	km	Destinations	Notes
	0.000	0.000	US 301 south / SR 21 south (Statesboro Highway) / SR 73 (West Ogeechee Street) – Statesboro, Springfield, Sylvania	Southern terminus; southern end of US 301 and SR 21 concurrencies
Sylvania	1.921	3.092	SR 21 north / SR 21 Bus. east (Mims Road) – Millen, Sylvania, Screven County Industrial Park, Screven County Recreation Department	Northern end of SR 21 concurrency; western terminus of SR 21 Bus.; SR 21 Bus. provides access to Optim Medical Center – Screven
Sylvania	3.025	4.868	US 301 north (Burtons Ferry Highway) / SR 73 (North Main Street) – Allendale, Sylvania	Northern terminus; northern end of US 301 concurrency
1.000 mi = 1.609 km; 1.000 km = 0.621 mi: Concurrency terminus
