= Screven County School District =

School district in Georgia (U.S. state)

Address
- 216 Mims Road Sylvania, Georgia, 30467-1997; United States
- Coordinates: 32.75095°N 81.646526°W

District information
- Grades: Pre-school - 12
- Superintendent: Dr. Jim Thompson
- Accreditation(s): Southern Association of Colleges and Schools; Georgia Accrediting Commission

Students and staff
- Enrollment: 3,130
- Faculty: 186

Other information
- Telephone: (912) 564-7114
- Fax: (912) 564-7104
- Website: www.screven.k12.ga.us

Screven County School District is a public school district in Screven County, Georgia, United States, based in Sylvania. It serves the communities of Hiltonia, Newington, Oliver, Rocky Ford, and Sylvania.

== Schools ==
The district has one high school, one middle school, and one elementary school:

- Screven County High School
- Screven County Middle School
- Screven County Elementary School
