= Hiltonia =

Hiltonia can refer to:

- Hiltonia, Georgia
- Hiltonia, Trenton, New Jersey
