= John R. McKinney =

United States Army Medal of Honor recipient

John Randolph McKinney
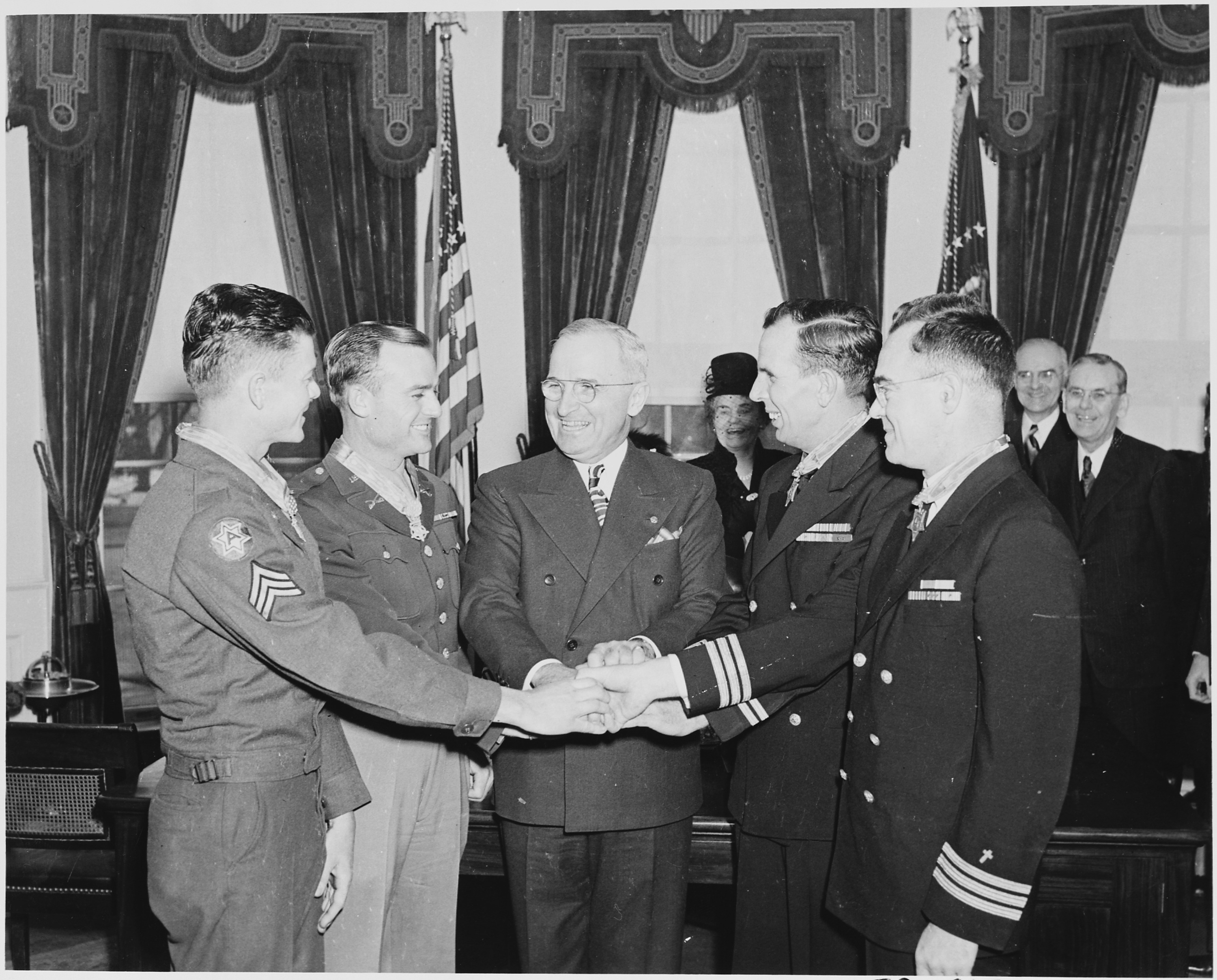
- McKinney (left) with President Harry S. Truman (center) and other Medal of Honor recipients at the medal presentation ceremony.
- Born: February 26, 1921; Woodcliff, Georgia, US
- Died: April 5, 1997 (aged 76); Sylvania, Georgia, US
- Military career
- Allegiance: United States
- Branch: U.S. Army
- Rank: Sergeant
- Nickname: "Mac"
- Units: Company A, 123rd Infantry Regiment, 33rd Infantry Division
- Conflicts: World War II
- Awards: Medal of Honor

John Randolph McKinney (February 26, 1921 – April 5, 1997) was a United States soldier who received the Medal of Honor in World War II during the campaign to recapture the Philippines from Japanese forces in 1945. Although greatly outnumbered by about 100 Japanese soldiers, McKinney was single-handedly able to secure a crucial battlefield area before reinforcements arrived. He was presented the Medal of Honor in a White House ceremony by President Harry S. Truman on January 23, 1946.

McKinney enlisted in the United States Army from Screven County, Georgia in November 1942. He served as a Sergeant in the United States Army.

== Medal of Honor citation ==
McKinney, John R.
Rank and organization: Sergeant (then Private), U.S. Army, Company A, 123d Infantry, 33d Infantry Division
Place and date: Tayabas Province, Luzon, Philippine Islands, May 11, 1945
Entered service at:Woodcliff, Georgia
Citation:

He fought with extreme gallantry to defend the outpost which had been established near Dingalan Bay. Just before daybreak approximately 100 Japanese stealthily attacked the perimeter defense, concentrating on a light machinegun position; having completed a long tour of duty at this gun, Pvt. McKinney was resting a few paces away when an enemy soldier dealt him a glancing blow on the head with a saber. Although dazed by the stroke, he seized his rifle, bludgeoned his attacker, and then shot another assailant who was charging him. Meanwhile, one of his comrades at the machinegun had been wounded and his other companion withdrew carrying the injured man to safety. Alone, Pvt. McKinney was confronted by ten infantrymen who had captured the machinegun with the evident intent of reversing it to fire into the perimeter. Leaping into the emplacement, he shot seven of them at pointblank range and killed three more with his rifle butt. In the melee the machinegun was rendered inoperative, leaving him only his rifle with which to meet the advancing Japanese, who hurled grenades and directed knee mortar shells into the perimeter. He warily changed position, secured more ammunition, and reloading repeatedly, cut down waves of the fanatical enemy with devastating fire or clubbed them to death in hand-to-hand combat. When assistance arrived, he had thwarted the assault and was in complete control of the area. Thirty-eight dead Japanese around the machinegun and two more at the side of a mortar 45 yards distant was the amazing toll he had exacted single-handedly. By his indomitable spirit, extraordinary fighting ability, and unwavering courage in the face of tremendous odds, Pvt. McKinney saved his company from possible annihilation and set an example of unsurpassed intrepidity.

== Heroism on Luzon, Philippines ==
US Army Pvt. John McKinney had stood guard duty and had just gone to his tent in the early hours May 11, 1945 on the island of Luzon, Philippines. The vanguard of a Japanese force slipped past the guard post. Sgt. Fukutaro Morii threw open McKinney's tent flap and slashed down with his sword, no doubt to minimize the sound of the as-yet undetected attack. He severed part of McKinney's ear. McKinney, a skilled hunter from Georgia, grabbed the rifle he slept with, bashed Morii in the chin and finished him off with another blow to the head.

Over the next 36 minutes, McKinney protected the flank of his company and his sleeping comrades by killing 38 of the enemy. McKinney did so through point-blank, kill-or-be-killed encounters as well as rapid-fire, accurate shots with various M1 rifles he picked up and fired at charging enemies. Early in the engagement, he returned to his foxhole where he eliminated first one wave and then part of the second wave of the main attack force. Several in the second wave made it to the foxhole where McKinney first shot and then clubbed his assailants in hand-to-hand combat.

== Awards and decorations ==

Badge	Combat Infantryman Badge		
1st row	Medal of Honor		Bronze Star Medal
2nd row	Purple Heart	Army Good Conduct Medal	American Campaign Medal
3rd row	Asiatic-Pacific Campaign Medal with two campaign stars	World War II Victory Medal	Philippine Liberation Medal

== Death ==
McKinney died on April 5, 1997.

== Legacy ==
The State of Georgia renamed a highway The John R. McKinney Medal of Honor Highway in his honor.

== See also ==
- List of Medal of Honor recipients
