= Millhaven =

Millhaven may refer to:

- Millhaven Institution, a Canadian prison
- Millhaven, Ontario, a community in Canada
- Millhaven Creek, Ontario, Canada
- Millhaven, Georgia, a community in the United States
