= Dover, Georgia =

- Unincorporated community
- Location within Georgia
- Coordinates: 32°34′38″N 81°42′54″W
- Country: United States
- State: Georgia
- County: Screven
- Elevation: 102 ft (31 m)
- Time zone: UTC-5 (Eastern (EST))
  - Summer (DST): UTC-4 (EDT)
- ZIP code: 30424
- Area code: 912
- GNIS feature ID: 355538

Dover is an unincorporated community in Screven County, Georgia, United States. The community is located at the intersection of U.S. Route 301, Georgia State Route 17, and Georgia State Route 73, 11.7 miles (18.8 km) south-southwest of Sylvania. Dover has a post office with ZIP code 30424.

== History ==
A post office called Dover has been in operation since 1886. According to tradition, the community was named after a place mentioned in a Baptist publication.
