= Samuel Shepard Lines House =

Historic house in Georgia, United States

- U.S. National Register of Historic Places
- Location within Georgia
- Location: 17809 Sunburst Rd., northeast of Sylvania in Screven County, Georgia
- Coordinates: 32.93752°N 81.59531°W
- Area: less than one acre
- Built: 1857
- Architectural style: Plantation Plain
- NRHP reference No.: 83000240
- Added to NRHP: July 14, 1983

The Samuel Shepard Lines House, located northeast of Sylvania, Georgia, was built in 1857. It was listed on the National Register of Historic Places in 1983.

It is a one-story Plantation Plain-style raised cottage. The listing included two other contributing buildings and one other contributing structure.

The house burned to the ground in 1986. However, the property remained listed on the National Register.

The exact location of the property is not clear. Alternative possibilities are:

- 32.93752°N 81.59531°W, coordinates per LandmarkHunter
- 32.935742°N 81.595612°W, converted from the nom form
- 32.93762°N 81.59544°W, also converted from the nom form
- 32.9375°N 81.595556°W, another
- 32.937616°N 81.95439°W, yet another.
