= Georgia State Route 73 Bypass =

Georgia State Route 73 Bypass may refer to:

- Georgia State Route 73 Bypass (Glennville): a former bypass route that existed in Glennville
- Georgia State Route 73 Bypass (Statesboro): a bypass route that exists in Statesboro
