= WAWS =

WAWS may refer to:

- WAWS (FM), a radio station (107.3 FM) licensed to serve Claxton, Georgia, United States
- WFOX-TV, a television station (channel 32, virtual 30) licensed to serve Jacksonville, Florida, United States, which held the call signs WAWS-TV in 1981 and WAWS from 1981 to 2014
