= 159th Liaison Squadron =

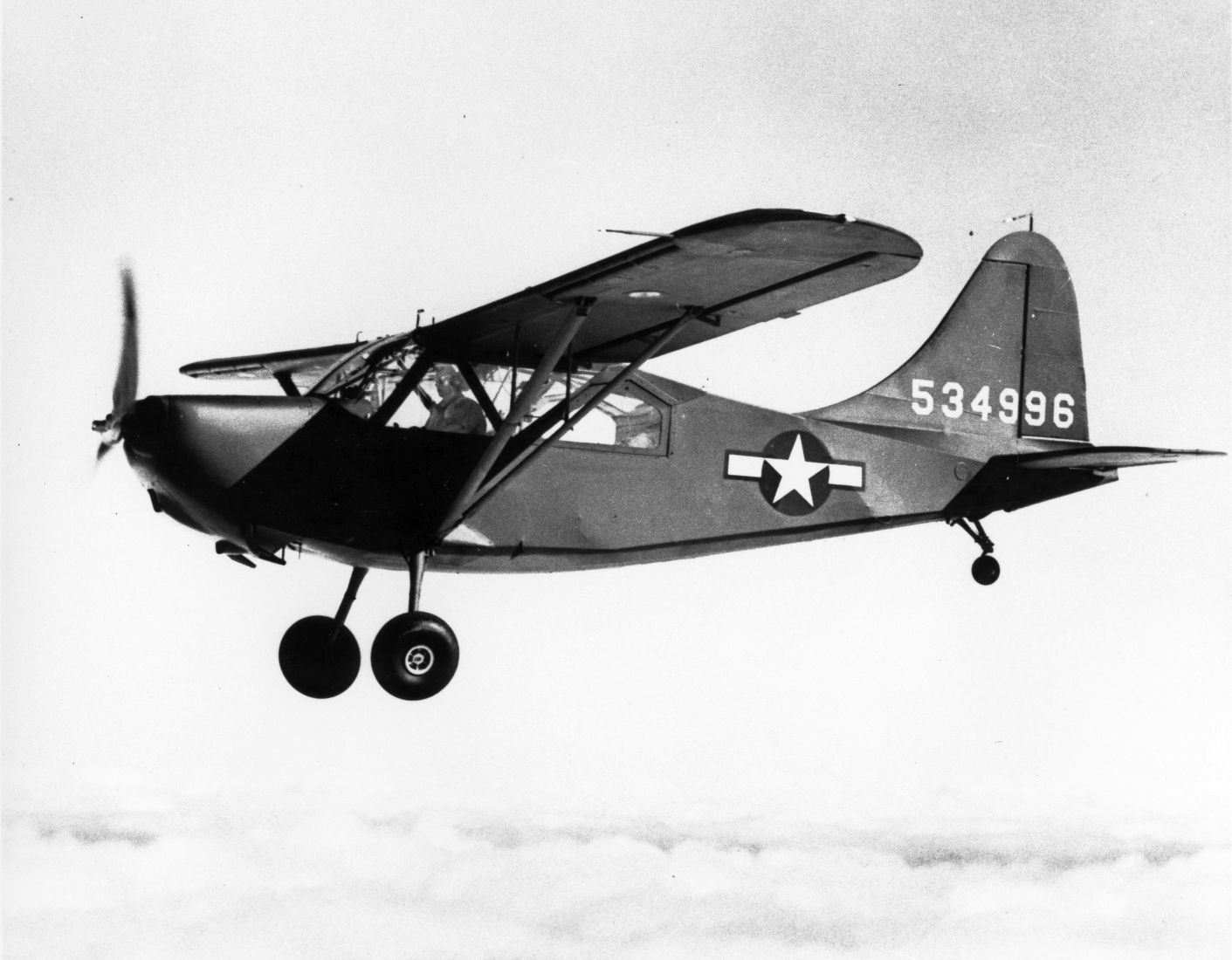
- The Stinson L-5 Sentinel was the main aircraft of the 159th Liaison Squadron
- Active: 1944–1946
- Country: United States
- Branch: United States Army Air Forces
- Type: Liaison
- Role: Liaison, Reconnaissance, Air Resupply
- Part of: 3d Air Commando Group
- Engagements: World War II (Asia-Pacific Theater): Battle of Luzon

- Decorations: Philippine Republic Presidential Unit Citation

Commanders
- Notable commanders: Capt. Rush H. Limbaugh Jr.** 1st Lt. William G. Price III

The 159th Liaison Squadron is an inactive United States Air Force unit. It was last assigned to V Fighter Command, and was inactivated on 31 May 1946 at Itami Airfield, Japan.

The squadron was a World War II Air Commando unit, primarily seeing combat during the Philippines Campaign (1944–45) with the 3d Air Commando Group. Flying unarmed Stinson L-5 Sentinel and UC-64A Norseman light aircraft, the squadron flew courier and aerial reconnaissance missions and dropped munitions and supplies to American and Philippine forces fighting in the Battle of Luzon.

== History ==
=== Origins and training ===
The unit was activated on 1 March 1944 at Cox Field, Paris, Texas under Second Air Force. after a brief time for organization, the squadron was moved to Pounds Field, near Tyler, Texas. Upon arrival, the squadron was composed of 109 enlisted and 12 officer personnel. At Pounds, the squadron was equipped with the Stinson L-5 Sentinel, single engine light observation aircraft and on 1 May it was designated as a Commando squadron, being assigned to the 3d Air Commando Group.

After a period of training, the squadron was reassigned to Statesboro Army Airfield on 1 June where it joined with the 157th and 160th Liaison Squadrons which had been organized at Brownwood Army Air Field, Texas. There it found the 341st Airdrome Squadron, which would serve as the service organization for all of the Liaison Squadrons. The first part of the month of June was spent in setting up the squadron at its new location. Thirty-two L-5 and three UC-64A aircraft were available for flying during the month. Emphasis was continually placed upon short field landings, minimum altitude cross-country flights and formation flying. Training was brought up to date in camouflage, medical subjects and intelligence. Classes in code, blinker, the actual reading of panels from the air, and first aid continued during the month, increasing the proficiency of the pilots in these subjects.

The mission of the Liaison Squadrons was to deploy to the Philippine Islands in support of ground combat units, providing courier service, battlefield observation, medical evacuation and delivery of supplies and munitions by parachute drop or landing on nearby roads and unimproved airstrips. By the beginning of October 1944, the squadrons were judged ready to deploy. From Statesboro Army Air Field, Georgia the Squadron moved to Cross City AAB. Florida. In October they transferred to Drew Field, Tampa Florida for final preparations.

After several weeks, the squadrons began leaving by train on 24 October, heading for Camp Stoneman, Oakland California where the men were issued tropical uniforms, attending more classes and lectures, getting shots and filling out an endless number of forms. On 6 November, the men boarded ferries to board the USS General M. L. Hersey, their transport to the war zone in the Southwest Pacific. A brief stop was made at Guadalcanal, which had become a major logistics base, then they proceeded to Finschafen and Hollandia on New Guinea. On 26 November the ship departed for Leyte, where it arrived on 30 November near the village of Palo.

=== Leyte ===
Upon arrival, it was found that the squadron was not expected, and there was no place for the men to be quartered. Pup tents were issued and they were directed to find a place to bivouack. At the same time, a period of rain began and the tents began to sink into the muddy ground. It took three days before they were able to move to a beach encampment near San Roque. Also cots arrived which enabled the men to stay above the water which ran through the tents constantly.

After a few days at the arrival camp, the squadrons began to move to a new airfield in the vicinity of Tanauan. It was there that the squadrons were given their assignments to V Fighter Command, and then to the 86th Fighter Wing. The airfield, however, required much construction to turn it into a functional facility and most of December was involved in construction activities. While waiting for the arrival of their planes, the men of the squadrons used a single bulldozer and their hands to work on the airfield, giving it the name "Mitchell Field", after 2d Lieutenant William Mitchell, who led the construction effort. Also the squadron was able to borrow a few L-5s from the 25th Liaison Squadron to fly proficiency flights.

=== Battle of Luzon ===
On 9 January 1945, two Corps of the Sixth United States Army landed on the shores of Lingayen Gulf, just a few miles south of where the Japanese had invaded the island on 22 December 1941. From the landing beaches, the Corps drove south to the Manila area while maintaining a strong defensive line to the North. In this liberated beachhead, two major airfields plus smaller liaison landing strips were hastily constructed. With the landings on Luzon, the members of the three 3d Commando Group's Liaison Squadrons gathered their equipment and supplies and loaded onto LST 919 for the trip to the Lingayen beachhead. Upon arrival, the units moved by truck convoy on 1 February to a rough airstrip near Calaiso, where some landing strips, carved out by the men of the 168th Field Artillery Regiment, were being used by an L-5 Stinson for artillery spotting.

While moving to Luzon, back on Leyte, some new L-5Bs had arrived in crates and a detachment of the squadron had remained to assemble the aircraft. After assembling the aircraft, making some test flights, and configuring some bomb shackles for the carrying and dropping of supplies, some auxiliary gas tanks were installed in the rear of the cockpit to increase the planes' range. On 6 February, twenty-eight modified L-5Bs of the squadron took off from Leyte for the airstrip at Calasio. They were escorted by some Marine Corps Vought F4U Corsairs and a Navy PBY Catalina that provided both navigation and fighter protection. As more planes were assembled on Leyte, they were also ferried up to equip the other two squadrons on Luzon.

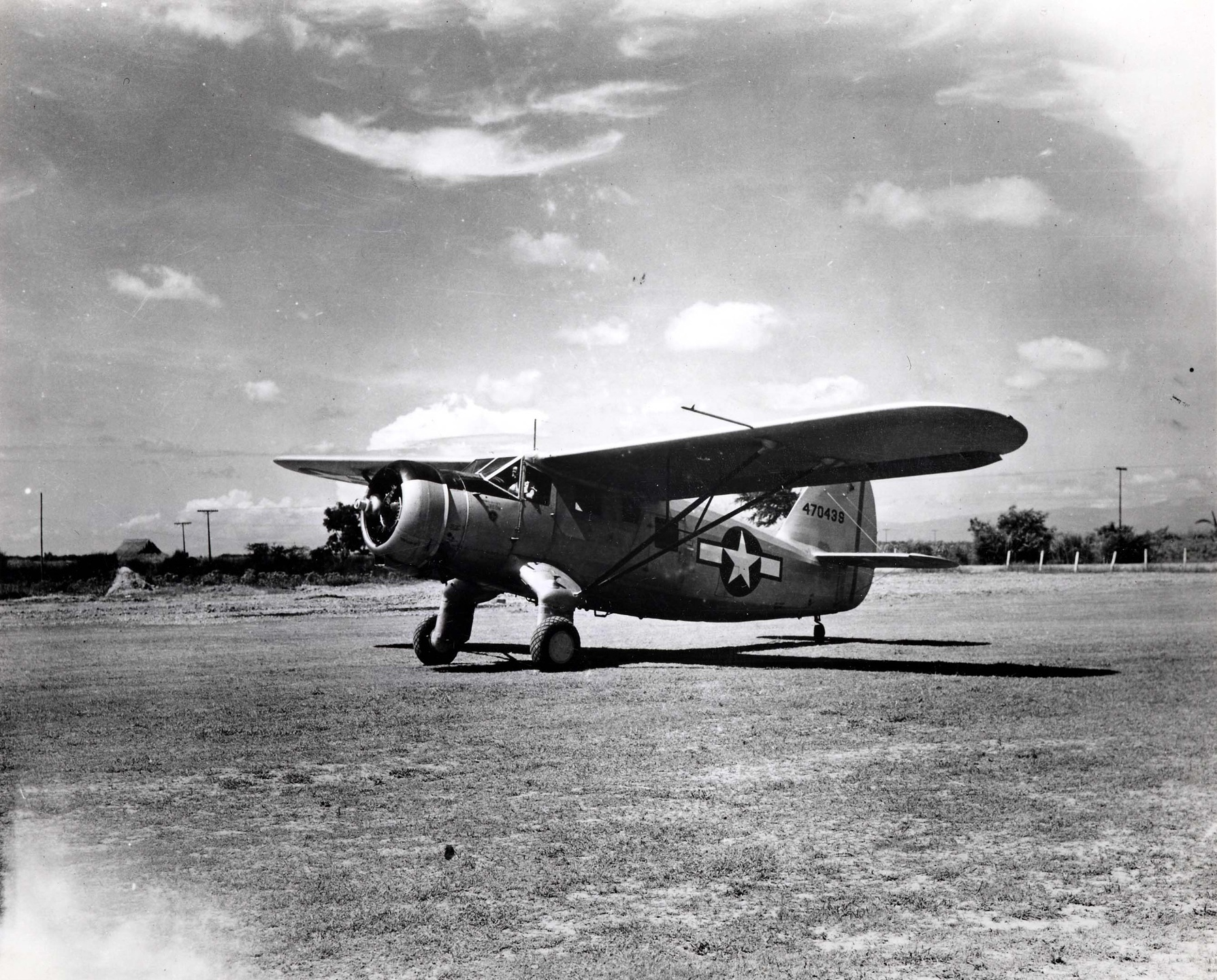
Noorduyn UC-64A Norseman (s/n 44-70439) from the 3rd Air Commando Group.

Upon their arrival in the combat zone, the men and pilots of the squadron immediately began flying missions, evacuating wounded, flying supply missions and also performing battlefield reconnaissance with individuals flying as many as 20 missions a day. In its first three weeks in combat, the squadron evacuated over 1,500 wounded, flew seventy supply missions, delivering over 14,000 pounds of supplies. With such a heavy schedule of flights, it was not long before the first combat loss occurred. On 10 February, while flying over Japanese-occupied Nichols Field on a reconnaissance flight, SSGt Donald McDonell suffered wounds when the plane was hit by ground fire. Both of the planes wingtips were blown off and he suffered wounds to a knee and wrist; however he managed to coax the plane back to a recently captured landing strip in Grace Park, one of Manila's northern suburbs. He recovered from his wounds; the plane was written off.

A few days after the Lingayen landings, the guerrillas of the U.S. Army Forces in the Philippines (Northern Luzon), along with Philippine Scouts, began to strike in force in the rear areas of Japanese-occupied territory. The men of this unit were a mixture of Americans who were stay-behinds from the Battan Campaign who escaped from Japanese forces and Filipinos who continued the fight after the surrender in April 1942. By mid-February 1945, the Japanese had been pushed back into the mountains of Luzon near Vigan. Seeking to exploit the situation, Fifth Air Force directed that supplies be flown into the area to aid the guerrilla forces. Several airfields which the Air Commandos chose where in pretty bad shape, with the runways pockmarked with shell holes. The planes operated from crude strips in the mountains, evacuating wounded, bringing in supplies, and supporting behind-the-lines operations of the Alamo Scouts. The unit also directed air strikes. Three 159th pilots lost their lives in the operation. S/Sgt Jack Smith was lost when his plane was hit by ground fire. He was carrying out two guerrillas wedged in the back seat. Despite the plane crashing and burning, his passengers survived without injury. G/O Robert Hutchinson and passenger Cpl. Alfred Bennet crashed in a narrow valley near Cervantes while trying to climb out of a confined area. Ferdinand Marcos was a member of the Filipino guerrillas and had his headquarters at Luna.

A second detachment supported the 308th Bomb Wing. The detachment operated off a drained rice paddy adjoining the Lingayan Air Strip and was housed in a Nipa hut in the middle of a bomb dump. Activities included courier service, delivering weapons to guerrillas behind enemy lines, search missions, marking bombing targets and air sea rescue. One aircraft was damaged when its engine quit over the trees at the end of the landing strip. The pilot, S/Sgt Neil Livesay, received a written commendation from 5th Air Force HQ for his outstanding airmanship. His passenger was the 5th AF Flying Safety Officer.

A third detachment operated out of Bacolod on Negros Island in support of Marines and the 40th Infantry Division during the Negros campaign. It was while performing a drop mission that M/Sgt Oliver M. Edwards, a Flight Leader, was shot down and later killed by the Japanese. His passenger was also killed and beheaded. M/Sgt was post-humorously awarded the Silver Star for his action in support of the 40th Infantry Division. He was also the first 159th member killed in action.

A fourth detachment operated off the main street of Cebu City in support of the Americal infantry division. In addition to evacuation and supply missions, they participated in directing naval bombardment of the island, with naval observers aboard. Many of the evacuation missions were performed at night.

Throughout the spring of 1945, as American forced cleared the Japanese from Luzon, squadron aircraft evacuated the wounded and the sick, dropped food and medical supplies to guerrilla forces as well as American infantry, directed artillery fire and air strikes, ferried officers from place to place, and performed all manner of tasks which it was assigned. An unusual mission carried out by the 157th was to lay a telephone line between two mountaintop positions. Another atypical operation was to broadcast propaganda to Japanese troops from large speakers mounted to the wing struts of an L-5.

In mid-April, the squadron received some glider pilots who were checked out on the L-5, which enabled the regular squadron pilots to get some much needed rest from their grueling schedules. The Japanese were retreating quickly and the order of the day was to pursue and attack them whenever possible, liberating village after village. However it was not all work and combat for the unit. Softball games were held and other forms of recreation were encouraged. Occasionally movies were shown and on one occasion, the visit of comedian Joe E. Brown was held. The news of the surrender of Germany on 7 May was welcomed. Combat continued through May and into June and at the end of the month, General MacArthur declared the Luzon Campaign over at midnight of 30 June/1 July 1945. However, the Japanese were still active in the Cagayan Valley, where the enemy had chosen to gather the remnants of their forces. Mission after mission was flown into the area, and it was not until 25 July that the Cagayen Valley was secured.

=== Okinawa ===
With the war winding down in the Philippines it was evident another move was in store. On 15 July, the squadron was ordered to move to Okinawa. The ground echelon left Mablecat on 15 June for Subic Bay to board an LST for the trip. The pilots were left behind and attached to the 160th LS. Upon arrival, the squadron set up a camp at Yontan Airfield, where the main Fifth Air Force airfield was located. After a few days, they moved to an area just north of the village of Bise on the Motobu Peninsula. Back on Luzon, the 157th's pilots began installing 75-gallon belly tanks on their L-5s and UC-64s to make the long over-water flight to Okinawa. The planes took off from Mabalcat and landed at Gabu on the coast, where their tanks were topped off and the planes given a thorough inspection. From there, the planes took off, shepherded by a pair of Air-Sea Rescue PBY Catalinas in a loose formation. After a seven-hour flight, and very low on gasoline, the squadron's planes touched down at Yontan without incident.

At the end of July, the squadron received orders to move to Ie Shima. However, on 6 August, the atomic bomb was dropped on Hiroshima, Japan and three days later a second atomic bomb devastated Nagasaki. On 14 August the Japanese announced their surrender. On 19 August, the squadron witnessed a bit of history when a pair of Japanese Mitsubishi G4M "Betty" Bombers, painted white with green crosses landed on the island on their way to Manila. They were carrying a surrender delegation to meet General MacArthur for surrender negotiations. The Japanese transferred to a C-54 Skymaster at Yontan while their crews stayed behind to tend to their planes and be observed by curious onlookers. The war ended on 2 September without any combat being seen by the squadron on Okinawa.

=== Inactivation ===
The end of the war found the squadron dispersed between Ie Shima, Yontan Airfield and some personnel still on Luzon. Personnel began to be sent back to the United States to be demobilized, and on 19 September, the remnants of the 159th left for Kanoya, Japan assigned to V Fighter Command to be part of the American occupation force.

The 159th was assigned the duty of flying into various Japanese Airfields to monitor the ordered disabling of the Japanese aircraft. Some humorous incidents occurred with this operation. S/Sgt. Hankison landed on one field and found all the top Japanese commanders in formation and offering to surrender all the men, 100 aircraft and 50 tanks to him. At another field the pilot saw all the personnel run for cover when he flew over the field. The L-5s were particularly useful, due to its ability to land on roads and other locations where bomb damage had made airfields useless. Eventually, its personnel remained in the theater long enough to have amassed the required number of "points" and by the spring of 1946, most personnel had returned to the United States. The unit itself was inactivated by Fifth Air Force at the end of May 1945.

.** Captain Rush H. Limbaugh Jr, (father of the radio talk-show host) was assigned and assumed command of the squadron on 21 May 1944. He had formerly been assigned to the Key Field Replacement Training Unit (TE), Key Field, Meridian, Mississippi. Shortly after the squadron's arrival at Drew Field, Tampa, Florida, he was hospitalized with acute appendicitis and replaced by Lt. William G. Price III.

=== Lineage ===
- Constituted as 159th Liaison Squadron, 23 February 1944

Activated on 1 March 1944
Re-designated: 159th Liaison Squadron (Commando), 1 May 1944
Re-designated: 159th Liaison Squadron, 25 November 1945
Inactivated on 31 May 1946

=== Assignments ===
- II Tactical Air Division, 1 March 1944
- I Tactical Air Division, 18 April 1944
- 3d Air Commando Group, 1 May 1944

Attached to: 5th Air Liaison Group (Provisional), May–September 1945
Attached to: 310th Bombardment Wing, September 1945-25 March 1946

- V Fighter Command, 25 March-31 May 1946

=== Stations ===
- Cox Field, Texas, 1 March 1944
- Pounds Field, Texas, 25 March 1944
- Statesboro Army Airfield, Georgia, 1 June 1944
- Cross City Army Airfield, Florida, 18 August 1944
- Drew Field, Florida, 6–26 October 1944
- Lete, Philippines, 1 December 1944
- Mangaldan Airfield, Philippines, 31 January 1945

Detachment operated from: Negros, 1 April-24 June 1945
Detachment operated from: Cebu, Unknown-25 June 1945

- Okinawa, 30 August 1945
- Kanoya Airfield, Japan, 10 September 1945
- Itami Airfield, Japan, October 1945-31 May 1946

=== Aircraft ===
- Stinson L-5 Sentinel, 1944–1946
- UC-64A Norseman, 1944–1946
