= Seaborn Goodall House =

Historic house in Georgia, United States

- U.S. National Register of Historic Places
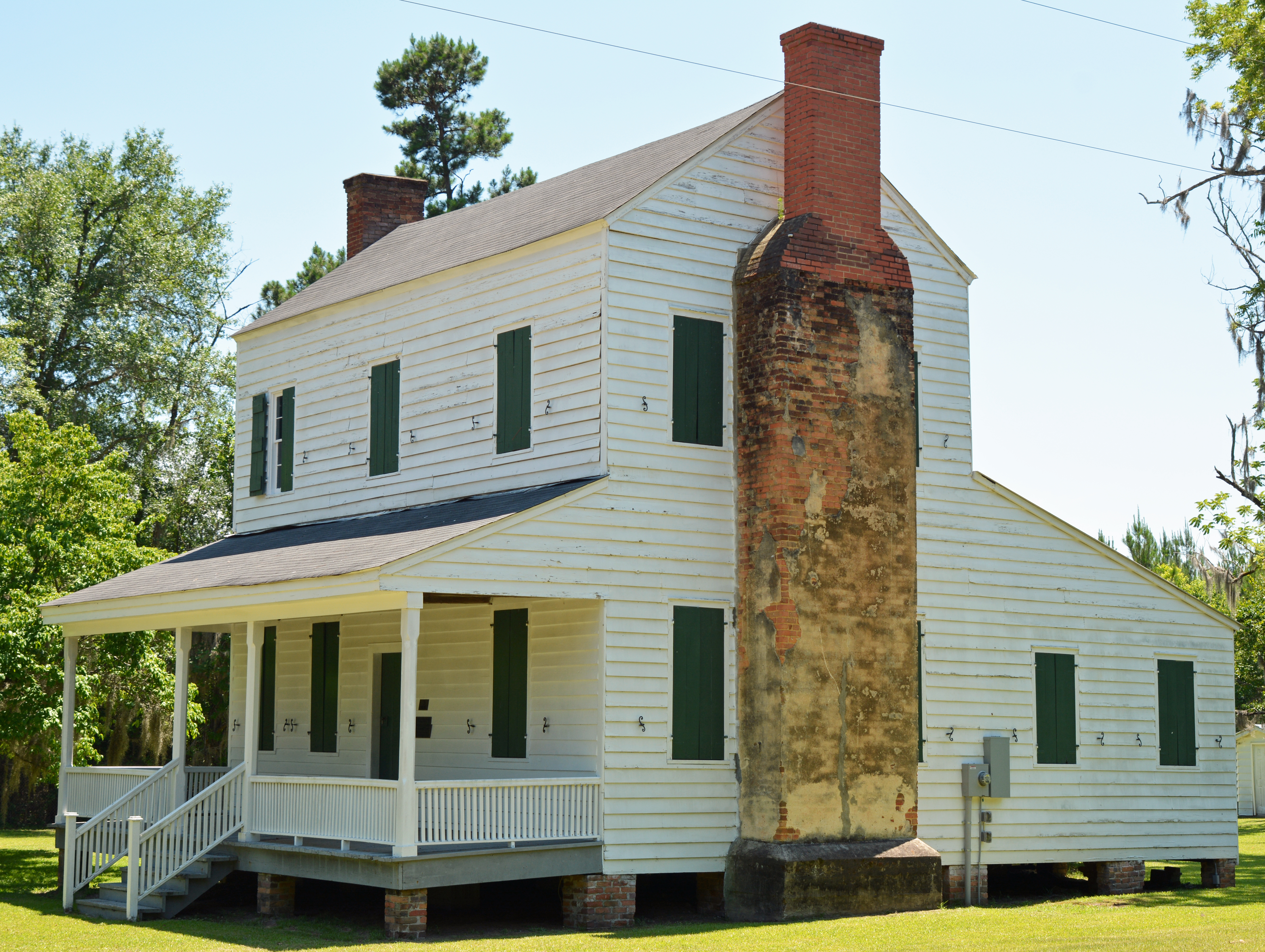

- Location within Georgia
- Location: North of Sylvania at junction of U.S. 301, Sylvania, Georgia
- Coordinates: 32.82686°N 81.62472°W
- Area: 3.7 acres (1.5 ha)
- Built: 1815
- Architectural style: "plantation plain"
- NRHP reference No.: 77000443
- Added to NRHP: October 17, 1977

The Seaborn Goodall House in Screven County near Sylvania, Georgia was built in 1815. It is a Plantation Plain-style house. It was listed on the National Register of Historic Places in 1977. It has also been known as the Goodall-Dell House and locally as the Dell-Goodall House .

It was built in Jacksonborough, a former town which was the county seat of Screven County from 1795 to 1847, by Seaborn Goodall. According to the house's NRHP nomination,

He was the son of Pleasant Goodall, a Revolutionary soldier who fought at Brier Creek. Goodall was a prominent citizen of the county, a mason, pioneer in establishing the Methodist faith, and Clerk of the Superior Court of Screven County from 1816 - 1836. In 1820 he rescued Lorenzo Dow from a mob in town and harbored him in his home. Later Dow cursed the town to be destroyed except for the Goodall House. The town soon deteriorated away and only the Goodall home remains today.

The house now owned by the D.A.R.
