= Savannah Dragway =

Dragway

Coordinates: 32.048516°N 81.177056°W

Savannah Dragway was an eighth-mile (200 m) dragstrip used by the NHRA located near in Savannah, Georgia. The track opened as a quarter-mile (400 m) facility in 1968, but safety concerns and rising insurance costs caused it to convert to the smaller distance in the mid-1980s. They were almost forced to close down at the end of 2005, this was because a neighbour filed many noise complaints and also because their lease was expiring but the lease was extended into 2006 at the last minute.

In 2004, half a dozen people were hit by lightening at the dragway.

An eighth-mile track called "Savannah River Dragway" opened in 2006 in Screven County. It is further from Savannah, 50 miles (80 km) northwest of the old Savannah Dragway location.
