= Maffin =

Maffin may refer to:

- Bongo Maffin, a South African kwaito music group.
- Maffin Bay, known as Teluk Maffin in Indonesian, a small bay in the Pacific Ocean.
