= Harris-Murrow-Trowell House =

Historic house in Georgia, United States

- U.S. National Register of Historic Places
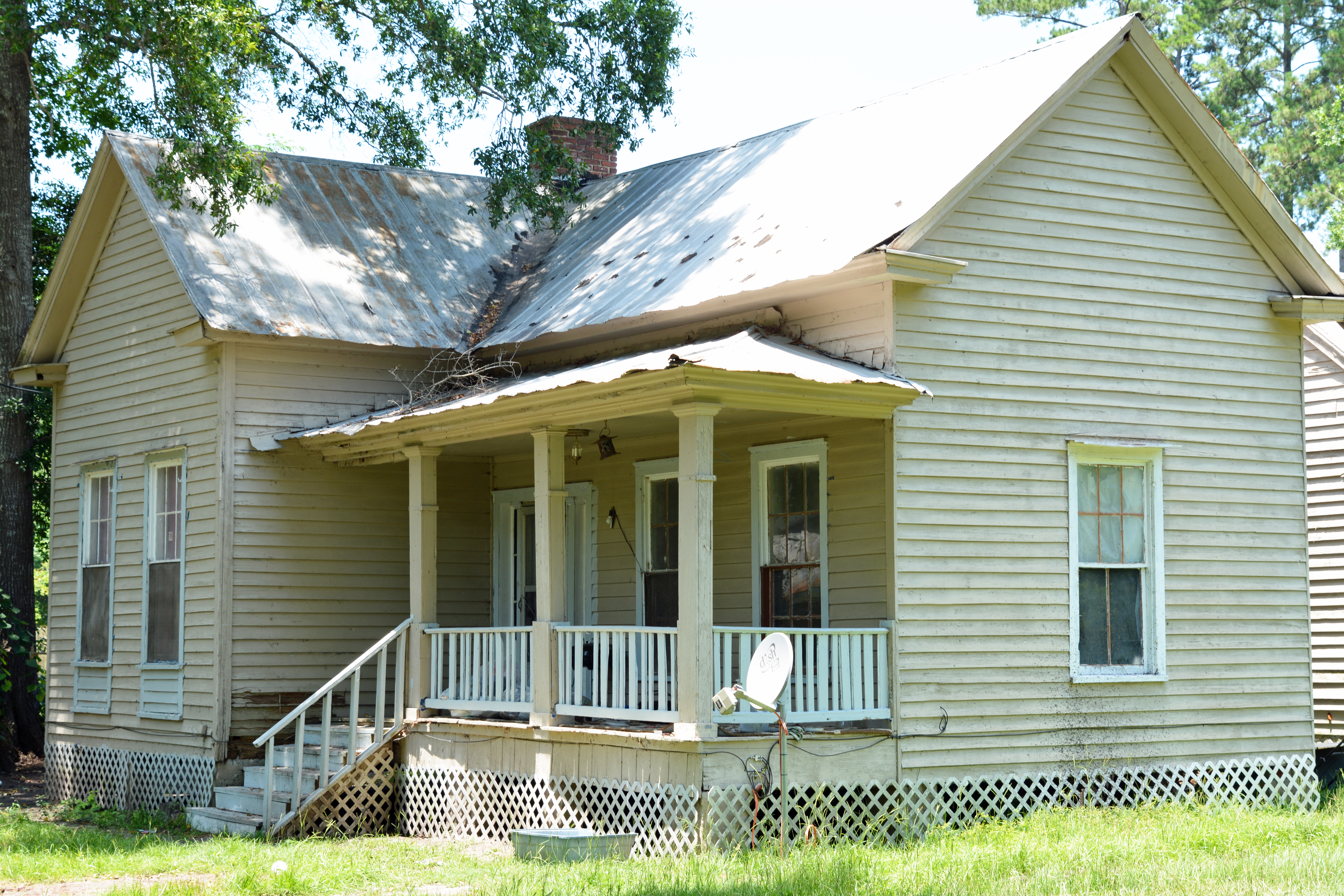

- Location within Georgia Location within the United States
- Location: 473 Old Louisville Rd., Oliver, Georgia
- Coordinates: 32.51778°N 81.53016°W
- Area: less than one acre
- Built: c.1888—1889
- Architectural style: gabled wing cottage
- NRHP reference No.: 09000187
- Added to NRHP: March 30, 2009

The Harris-Murrow-Trowell House in Screven County, Georgia was built c. 1888—1889 as one of the first houses in the small village of Oliver, after Central of Georgia Railway established a stop there. It was listed on the National Register of Historic Places in 2009.

Its NRHP nomination described it as having "local significance in the area of architecture as a good example of a c. 1888–1889 gabled wing cottage type house with an attached tenant house on the rear elevation. According to Georgia's Living Places: Historic Houses in Their Landscaped Settings, gabled wing cottages were built throughout Georgia primarily between 1875 and 1915 on farms and in Georgia's towns and cities. It was a popular house type that was built throughout the state in both modest and well-to-do parts of the state. The gabled wing cottage is either T-or L-shaped and usually has a gabled roof. Other than the rear addition, the Harris-Murrow-Trowell House retains its historic exterior and interior finishes and materials and has changed little since its construction."
