= 123rd Infantry Regiment (United States) =

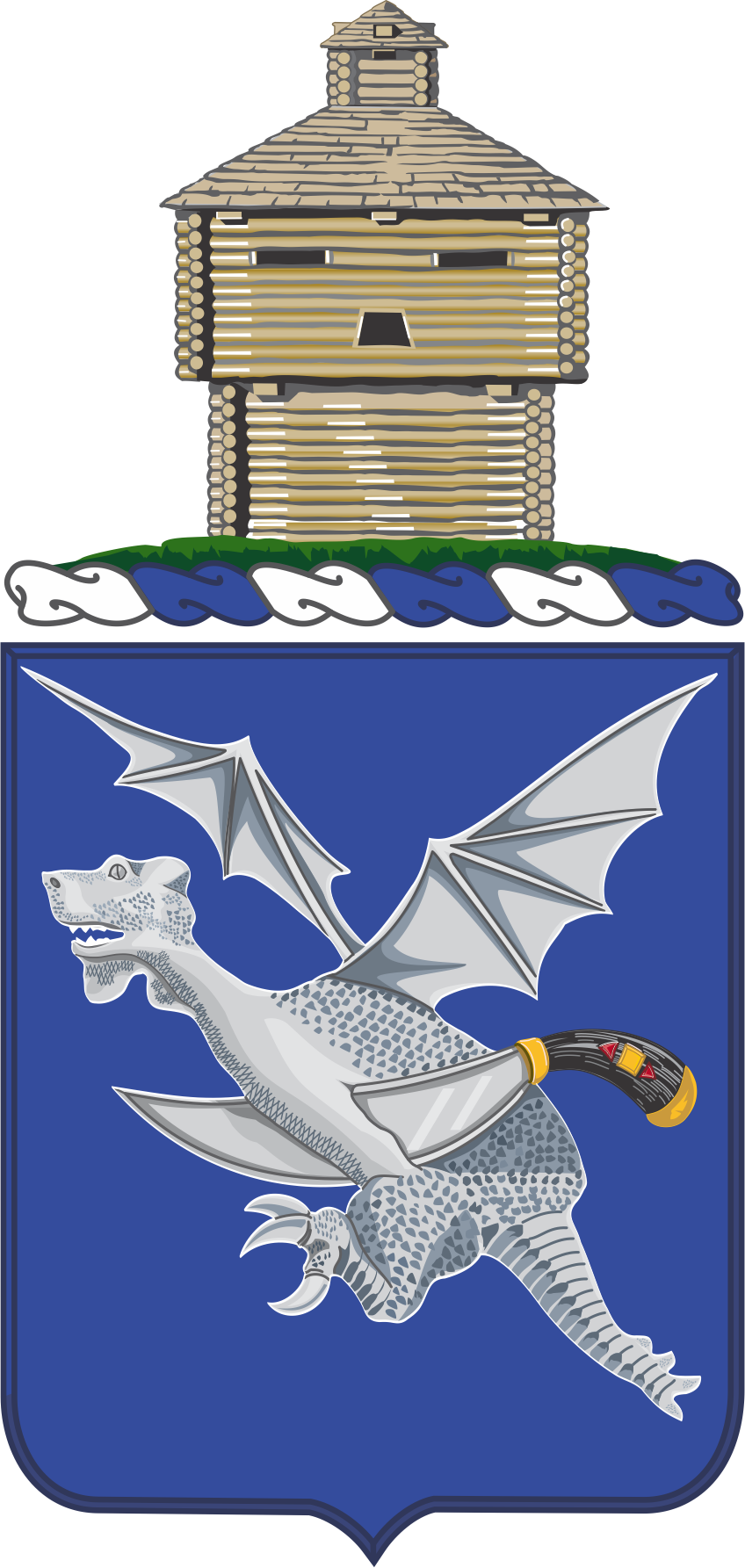
- Coat of arms
- Active: 1917-1919, 1942-1946
- Country: United States
- Allegiance: Illinois
- Branch: Illinois Army National Guard
- Type: Infantry
- Motto: 1, 2, 3 Go!
- Engagements: World War II: Battle of New Guinea; Battle of Luzon

Insignia
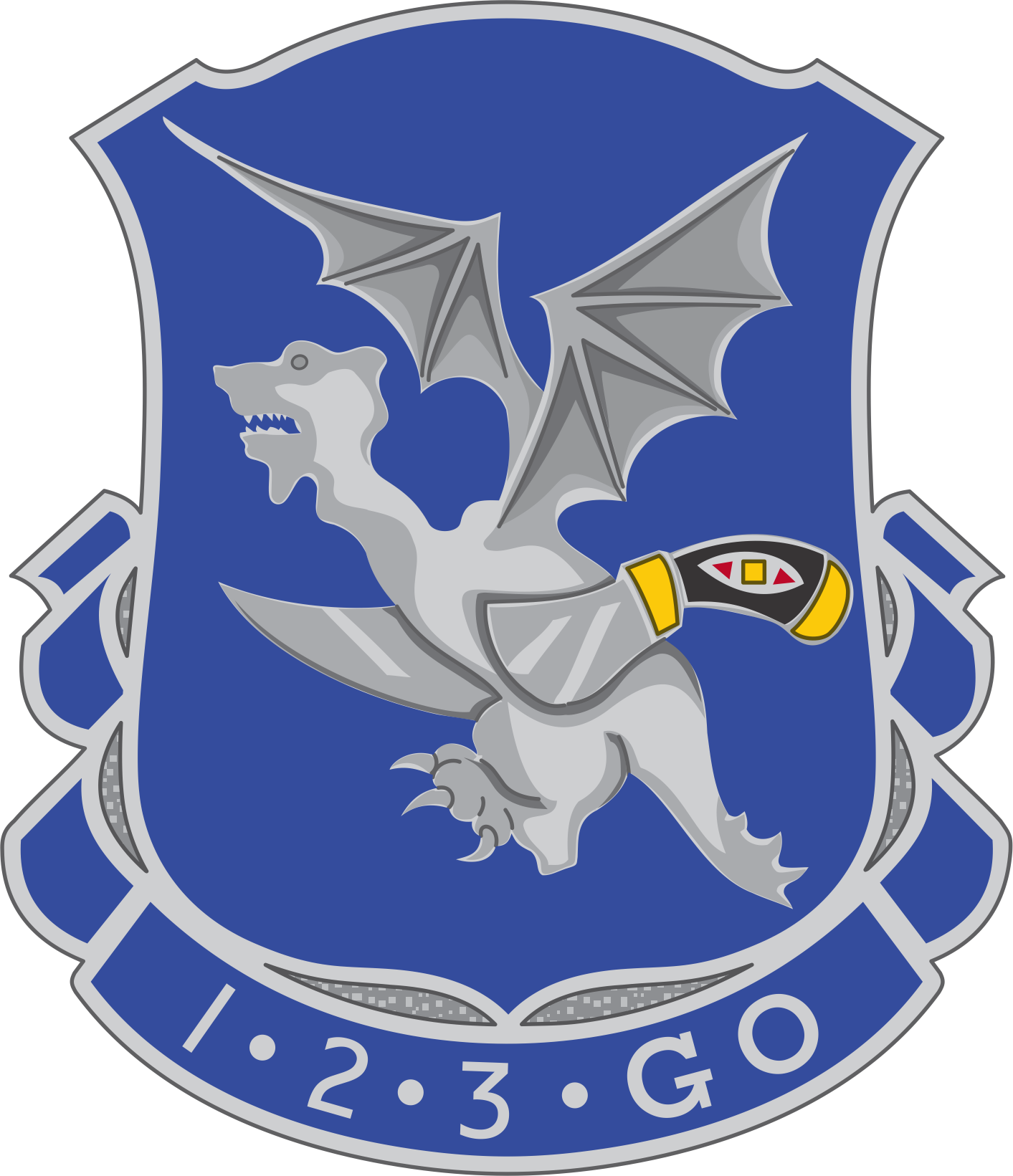
- Distinctive unit insignia

The 123rd Infantry Regiment was an infantry regiment of the United States Army.

The designation was first used in World War I for an Alabama National Guard unit part of the 31st Division.

In 1942, the 123rd was reactivated as a component of the Illinois Army National Guard and fought in World War II where it received acclaim for its jungle fighting against the Japanese in the Pacific Theater.

== World War I ==
During the First World War, the 123rd Infantry Regiment was organized from previous Alabama militia units, and was assigned to the 31st Infantry Division. Upon arrival in France, the 31st became a depot division, and all the recruits from its regiments were sent out to replace combat casualties in depleted units on the front. In 1946, this unit was reconstituted and reorganized as the 200th Infantry.

== World War II ==
The 123rd Infantry Regiment was activated for service in World War II on 29 September 1942, and joined the 33rd Infantry Division at Fort Lewis, Washington. The 33rd Division had released regiments to other commands, and now needed another infantry regiment to triangularize it. Thus, the 123rd regiment was attached to the division. Throughout the rest of 1942, and into March 1943, the regiment conducted thorough training at Fort Lewis until they moved to the Mojave Desert in early April 1943. They bivouacked near the Clipper Mountains and, along with other soldiers of the 33rd Division, had the distinction of being the first infantry trained in desert warfare without motorized vehicles. Originally trained in the desert for combat in North Africa, the 123rd Regiment, with the rest of the 33rd Division, was sent to duty in the Pacific. After 10 weeks of training in the Mojave, the regiment left for Camp Stoneman, CA, near San Francisco. The regiment departed California on 7 July 1943, and arrived in Hawaii on 13 July, where the 123rd was stationed on the island of Kauai. The regiment was slated for a nine-month tour of duty as Kauai's defence force, taking over from elements of the 40th Infantry Division California Army National Guard, and began training. They trained on jungle warfare, usage of flamethrowers, amphibious assaults, and certain men were selected for Ranger training where they were able to conduct a Ranger course that was attended by members of the regiment. On 25 April 1944, the 33rd Infantry Division's tenure as Hawaiian guards was over, and they set sail for New Guinea.

=== New Guinea Campaign ===
The 33rd Division landed at Finschhafen, New Guinea, on 11 May 1944 and the units were spread out in bivouac areas. The 123rd set up camp about twelve miles up the coast. Here, the men continued training in the jungle, but despite their infantry role, they were mainly used to unload supply ships in the harbor. On 20 August 1944, the 123rd Infantry was detached for independent operations near Maffin Bay, and relieved the entire 31st Infantry Division in order to guard the Wakde airstrip from Japanese attacks. Now designated as "Task Force Tornado," the 123rd conducted 258 one-day patrols and 29 two-day patrols, along with the score or more of five-day patrols. Resistance from the Japanese was frequent, and on each of these engagements the enemy was rendered ineffective. By the use of these patrols, the Japanese were prevented from closing in on the perimeter and their artillery was kept out of range. The men of the 123rd, even during their "baptism by fire," showed that quality training paid off, and they performed well even against a veteran enemy. When the 123rd took over the Toem-Sarmi area, there were around 2,000 Japanese in the area with 1,400 of them identified as combat troops. When the Regiment left the area for combat on Luzon, the total number of enemy killed in that sector, including those accounted for by preceding troops, had been swelled to 4,005. The most bitter battle of the Sarmi area took place when Company C of the 1st Battalion (1–123), led by CPT Marchant, encountered heavy resistance at Sawaar Airfield. On the second morning of their five-day patrol, they were greeted by a burst of enemy shells. The next day, the patrol ran into machine-gun fire after trudging though the thick mud of the Sago palm swamps. Four Japanese patrols were surprised and five of the enemy killed. However, the real battle would take place the following day. Three enemy tanks had infiltrated behind C Company's lines, and enemy mortar and machine gun fire supported the tanks. In the ensuing skirmish, which lasted all day, all three enemy tanks were knocked out, one of them by a well-aimed bazooka shot fired by Captain Marchant, and 25 Japanese dead were found laying around the jungle. This upped the total verified enemy casualties to 31, with only one member of the 123rd killed. He died from an aerial bomb booby-trap on the first day.

Also of note during the combat at Maffin Bay were the heroics of individual soldiers. SGT Victor Highsmith became the first 123rd man to be awarded a combat medal, the Bronze Star. SGT Winfield Green, later receiving an officer's commission, was the first to earn the Silver Star. Lieutenant Walter Roper, leading a patrol deep in enemy territory, was the first man in both the regiment and the division to lose his life in combat. CPL Roy Adams, of the Regimental Intelligence and Reconnaissance Platoon, was credited with being the first member of the Regiment to kill a Japanese soldier. Also, the first men in the 33rd Division to receive Purple Hearts were with Task Force Tornado at Maffin Bay. Its mission fulfilled, the 123rd Infantry was relieved by elements of the 93rd Infantry Division. All strategic materials and constructions were destroyed before they departed, to prevent anything falling into enemy hands. The Regiment left Maffin Bay on 26 January 1945, joined other elements of the 33rd Division en route, and departed for Luzon in the Philippines.

=== Luzon Campaign ===
The 123rd Infantry landed at Lingayen Gulf on 10 February 1945, and moved to the front lines three days later. They relieved the 158th Regimental Combat Team of the Arizona Army National Guard. The first shots fired by the 33rd Division on Luzon were by the 123rd's Regimental Cannon Company, which fired 105mm M3 howitzers in a direct-fire role, and inflicted heavy losses on the Japanese in the operations that followed. The first company to send out a patrol was B Company, 1–123. This patrol started out on 18 February and returned on the 24th. Strong enemy positions were encountered, and the patrol bypassed these areas to reach its objective. The first man to kill a Japanese soldier on Luzon was PFC Fay "Tex" Hough, a medic who was attached to C Company. He was attending a wounded man on the front when an enemy soldier popped up a short distance away. Hough finished him off and then completed his aid work. Unlike in Europe, it was common for aid-men to carry weapons in the Pacific Theater because the Japanese did not follow the Geneva Conventions and often killed Allied medics with indiscretion. 1-123 advanced on Rosario and from there moved along a highway to the foothills of Twin Peaks on the Kennon Road. Assigned with capturing these rugged peaks, two companies advanced up the slopes. As they approached the top, fierce opposition was encountered from well-concealed Japanese emplacements and the companies were forced to hold their positions. The Japanese were making a valiant defense of this area as it controlled the last water points on the routes leading to Baguio. The Americans were soon relieved by a substantially larger force and the enemy retreated over the mountains. Intelligence reports later disclosed that an entire Japanese battalion had been operating against A Company. Moving by night, 1-123 arrived at San Luis near Pugo. B Company had already sent a patrol to secure the town. An interesting incident occurred here. LT Merle Fleenor was assigned with laying telephone wire as soon as the town had been secured. He and his crew arrived and found nobody there. He thought that the patrol had gone through the village and was continuing the advance. Once he installed his phones, he called back to headquarters when the patrol arrived. Fleenor and his two wire section men had arrived ahead of the patrol and had taken over. 1-123 captured three more peaks the following day without the loss of a single man. 2nd Battalion (2–123) advanced up the other flank of Pugo in order to seize the high ground between Damortis and Rosario. The day that 1-123 took the three peaks, 2-123 captured strategic high ground just beyond Pugo. The RCP (Regimental Command Post) was moved to Pugo. The Third Battalion (3–123) operated along the coast towards San Fernando. 2-123 advanced toward Mount Calugong and Mount Santo Tomas through difficult terrain, and bulldozers followed them to clear the way for support troops. After 30 days of fighting, the regiment advanced 13 miles, but still had 7 miles to go before they reached Baguio. 3-123 relieved 2-123 and began the main effort. During the fighting in the mountains, units of 2-123 executed a brilliant night operation to capture strategic points on the route of advance. This night attack was so well undertaken that the Japanese were unaware that their strong emplacements had been occupied, and at daybreak the enemy was mowed down in great numbers as they emerged from their caves on the reverse side of the hill to man their positions. In the fight to the highest point of terrain, K Company 3-123 launched a well-coordinated attack after first having an artillery barrage laid down less than a hundred yards to the front. Timed to perfection, the assault, which immediately followed the lifting of the barrage, caught the Japanese in their foxholes and the victory was achieved without any casualties. 1–123, which was in I Corps reserve, rejoined the fight and attacked near Galiano. After numerous attacks on the enemy controlled high ground, the 123rd finally dislodged the Japanese from their strongpoints and the "race to Baguio" entered its final phase. F and G Companies of 2-123 performed admirably and were given awards after the mountain fighting. The 33rd Infantry Division and the 37th Infantry Division from the Ohio Army National Guard reached the outskirts of Baguio and the 123rd moved out of the mountains and into the valley near Tuba. G Company, sent to protect the regiment's left flank, annihilated two enemy companies as 3-123 neared the city limits. 3-123 nicknamed the brushy area near Baguio "Times Square" due to the heavy activity of enemy vehicles, including tanks. In the race for Baguio, it was rumored that the 33rd and the 37th Divisions erected road blocks to slow up the progress of the other: A patrol of C Company of 1-123 was the first to enter Baguio, but the final glory of taking the Summer Capital of the Philippines was divided between the two beleaguered divisions.

Before the ultimate dash towards Baguio, A Company was designated as a special task force and sent to Dingalen Bay on the far side of Luzon to act as a security force for the installations there. This force was commanded by Major Robert V. Connolly and was called the "Connolly Task Force." This 800-man task force included a reinforced rifle company of the 127th Infantry, 32d Division, one company of the 6th Ranger Infantry Battalion, a battery of 105-mm. howitzers, and engineer, medical, and port detachments. Assembling near Vigan, Connolly Task Force would follow Route 3 around the northwest tip of Luzon to the vicinity of Aparri, where a battalion of the 11th Infantry would join. Ordered to "annihilate the enemy forces fleeing north" by Gen. Krueger and to liberate, secure and occupy the Aparri region, the task force was also to prepare minor port facilities and a liaison plane airstrip along the coast west of Aparri. On 11 May 1945, a member of this force, PFC John R. McKinney, singlehandedly killed 40 Japanese soldiers in a half hour battle despite being wounded by a katana strike to the head. He was awarded the Medal of Honor.

Gen. Krueger's estimate of the Japanese situation dictated the need to make a vertical envelopment of airborne troops to close the trap and prevent the enemy from all possibility of escaping from Aparri. Accordingly, on 21 June, Krueger directed a battalion combat team of the 511th Parachute Infantry, 11th Airborne Division, to drop near Aparri on 23 June. By that evening, elements of Maj. Connolly's task force and the 2d Battalion of the 11th Infantry were ten miles south along Route 5 from Aparri and had secured Camalaniugan Airstrip, three miles from Aparri. On the very day that Krueger issued this order, the Connolly Task Force entered Aparri unopposed. There was no trap for the 511th Parachute Infantry to close. The Connolly Task Force was overwhelmingly successful in eliminating the remaining elements of the Japanese Imperial Army. Connolly reported 368 enemy dead and six prisoners taken. His losses for the operation were two killed and three wounded. Despite the great successes of the now reinforced Connolly Task Force, Krueger did not change his mind about the desirability and necessity for the airdrop. Instead, he concluded that the "seizure of Aparri without opposition” by elements of the Connolly Task Force on 21 June 1945, together with the almost unopposed advance of the 37th Division, indicated clearly that the time had come for mounting the airborne troops to “block the enemy's retreat in the Cagayan Valley." It is not clear just what retreat Krueger expected to block. The airborne force totaled about 1,030 men, including the reinforced 1st Battalion of the 511th Infantry and Battery C, 457th Parachute Field Artillery Battalion. Then Major (later LTC) Robert V. Connolly was awarded the Silver Star for Gallantry in Battle.

The 123rd Infantry Regiment as a whole took part in some of the longest and bloodiest campaigns of the US Army during World War II and it suffered a total of 96 combat casualties. Its relatively low casualty rate is a testament to the long and intensive training the unit underwent before engaging in combat.

=== Japan and Demobilization ===
The main units of the 123rd Infantry arrived in Japan on 25 September 1945 to conduct occupation duty. They were garrisoned at Takarazuka and remained until 6 February 1946, when it was fully demobilized and sent home. At the time the regiment arrived in Japan, their strength was 140 officers and 3,311 enlisted men. About 1,000 of the men were replacements who had joined the regiment on Luzon.

== After World War II ==
On 5 July 1946, the 123rd was assigned to the 44th Infantry Division of the Illinois National Guard with headquarters at Springfield. It was organized and its headquarters federally recognized on 29 January 1947.
