= Georgia Welcome Center =

Historic welcome center in Georgia, US

- U.S. National Register of Historic Places
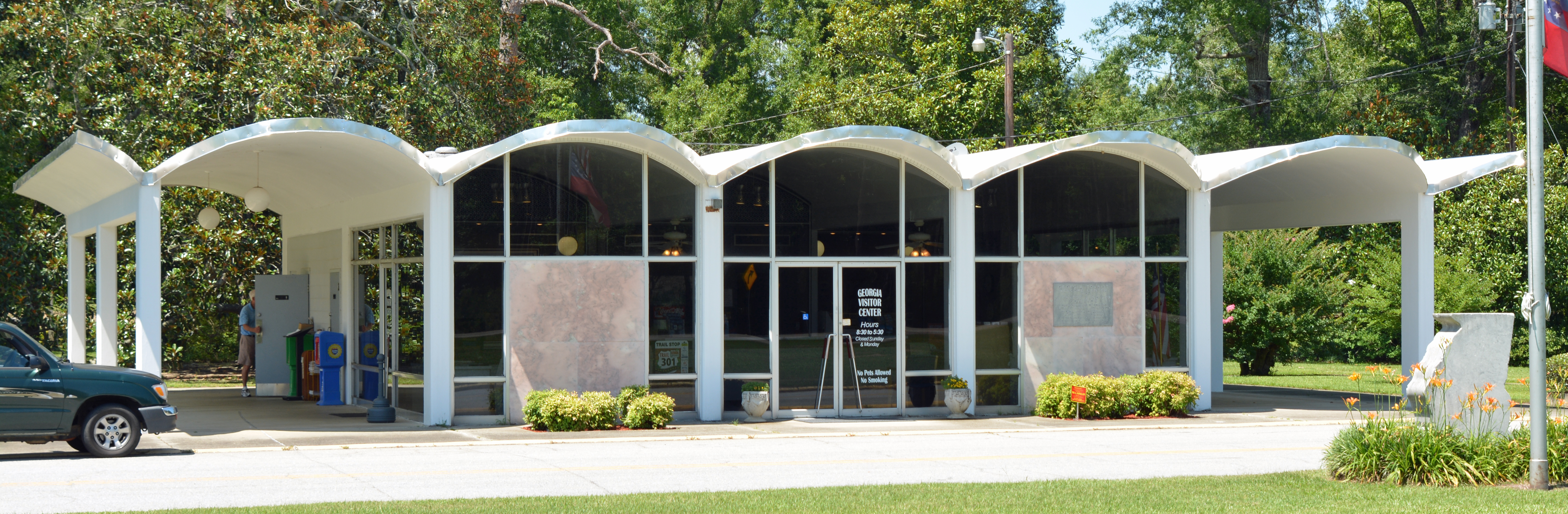
- Georgia Welcome Center (2016)

- Location within Georgia
- Location: 8463 U.S. 301/Burton's Ferry Highway, Sylvania, Screven County, Georgia
- Coordinates: 32.93784°N 81.51732°W
- Area: 3.63 acres (1.47 ha)
- Built: 1961
- Architect: Edwin C. Eckles
- NRHP reference No.: 11000959
- Added to NRHP: December 29, 2011

The Georgia Welcome Center was built in 1961 and formally dedicated early in 1962.

This was the first welcome center in Georgia, predating the arrival of the Interstate Highway System along the Georgia Coast. It is reportedly the oldest roadside welcome center in the U.S. that is still used for that purpose. It is on US Highway 301 in Screven County. less than 1 mile from the South Carolina border.
