= WAWS (FM) =

- Claxton, Georgia; United States
- Frequency: 107.3 MHz
- Branding: Air1

Programming
- Format: Contemporary worship
- Affiliations: Air1

Ownership
- Owner: Educational Media Foundation

History
- First air date: September 12, 1972
- Former call signs: WCLA-FM (1973–2004); WMCD (2004–2018); WZBX (2018); WLGK (2018–2019)

Technical information
- Licensing authority: FCC
- Facility ID: 65607
- Class: C3
- ERP: 25,000 watts
- HAAT: 100 meters
- Transmitter coordinates: 32°10′1.00″N 81°54′7.00″W

Links
- Public license information: Public file; LMS

WAWS (107.3 FM) is a Christian radio station licensed to Claxton, Georgia, United States. The station is currently owned by Educational Media Foundation (EMF). WAWS carries EMF's Air1 contemporary worship format.

== History ==
The station was assigned the WCLA-FM call letters on August 28, 1972; the station signed on September 12. On July 8, 2004, the station changed its call sign to WMCD. The WMCD call had belonged to a Statesboro FM station in the 1960s until the early 2000s.

On August 9, 2018, WMCD swapped call signs with then sister station WZBX. Effective August 31, 2018, the sale of WZBX by Radio Statesboro, Inc. to Educational Media Foundation was consummated at a purchase price of $150,000. EMF changed the station's call sign to WLGK the same day.

The station changed its call sign to WAWS on December 20, 2019.
