= Statesboro–Bulloch County Airport =

Statesboro–Bulloch County Airport Statesboro Army Air Field
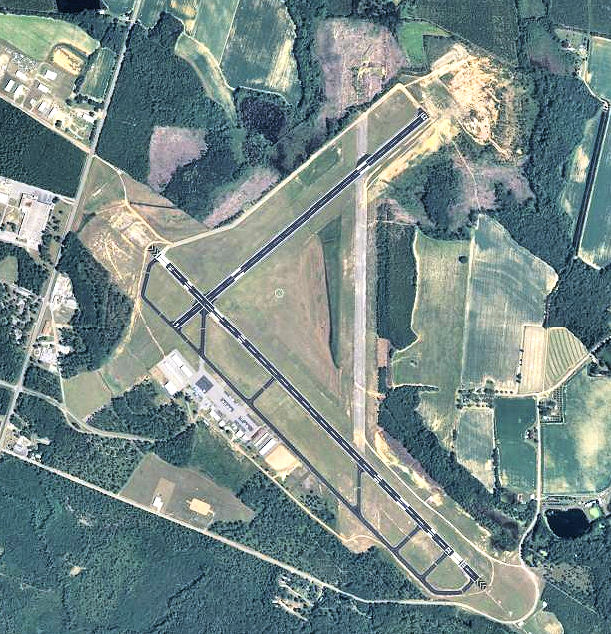
- 2006 USGS airphoto
- IATA: TBR; ICAO: KTBR; FAA LID: TBR

Summary
- Airport type: Public
- Owner: City of Statesboro & Bulloch County
- Serves: Statesboro, Georgia
- Location: Bulloch County, near Statesboro, Georgia
- Elevation AMSL: 187 ft (57 m)
- Coordinates: 32°28′58″N 081°44′13″W
- Website: statesboroairport.com

Map
- Location of Statesboro–Bulloch County Airport

Runways
| Direction | Length | | Surface |
| Direction | ft | m | Surface |
|---|---|---|---|
| 14/32 | 6,000 | 1,829 | Asphalt |
| 5/23 | 4,383 | 1,336 | Asphalt |

Statistics (2007)
- Aircraft operations: 18,500
- Based aircraft: 48
- Source: Federal Aviation Administration

Statesboro–Bulloch County Airport (IATA: TBR, ICAO: KTBR, FAA LID: TBR) is a public airport located three miles (5 km) northeast of the central business district of Statesboro, a city in Bulloch County, Georgia, United States. It is owned by the City of Statesboro and Bulloch County. Currently, there is no commercial service to the airport.

== Facilities and aircraft ==
Statesboro–Bulloch County Airport covers an area of 834 acres (338 ha) which contains two asphalt paved runways: 14/32 measuring 6,000 × 100 ft (1,829 × 30 m) and 5/23 measuring 4,383 × 100 ft (1,336 × 30 m).

Statesboro–Bulloch County Airport is home to the U.S. Air Force Auxiliary's Statesboro "Eagle" Composite Squadron (GA451) of the Civil Air Patrol. www.statesborocap.com

For the 12-month period ending June 27, 2007, the airport had 18,500 aircraft operations, an average of 51 per day: 54% local general aviation, 43% transient general aviation and 3% military. There are 48 aircraft based at this airport: 94% single-engine and 6% multi-engine.

== History ==
=== Origins ===
City and County leaders first considered establishing a municipal airport in 1934. The Department of Commerce approved two prospective sites the next year. During the first of 1936, government leaders leased a 93-acre tract three miles north of town, adjacent to and east of Highway 301. During the year, a 4,000-ft. grass landing strip was cleared and a hangar built. Initially known as the Bulloch County Airport, the facility celebrated the first landing of a locally owned aircraft on November 21, 1936.

The owner of the aircraft formed the Statesboro Aircraft Corporation on December 12, and shortly thereafter began offering flight instruction. The big news for the new airport and the community was the arrival of a Ford Trimotor on December 11. Under the sponsorship of the Pure Oil Company and the local Pure distributor, the Tri-Motor spent four days at Statesboro giving promotional sightseeing rides to the public.

On July 17, 1941, Statesboro received news that the Civil Aeronautics Administration had chosen its airport for improvement as a defense landing field. The government allocated $350,000 to construct two 150 × 4,000-ft. hard-surfaced runways, taxiways, a fence, and airfield lighting on the condition that the City and County procured a total of 604 acres. After the local government purchased the required land, the project opened for bids on November 15. On January 23, 1942, E. Jack Smith of Atlanta won the bid at $219,350; $13,000 under the government's estimate. The contractor began preliminary work at the site on January 26.

Soon after construction began, the United States Army Air Forces (AAF) became involved and enlarged the project. This required the local governments to acquire an additional 285 acres for longer runways, a third runway, and a 350 × 800- ft. ramp. The AAF purchased 50 acres on the west side of Highway 301 and built a cantonment area for 180 officers and 400 men. Total cost of the base exceeded $900,000.

=== World War II ===
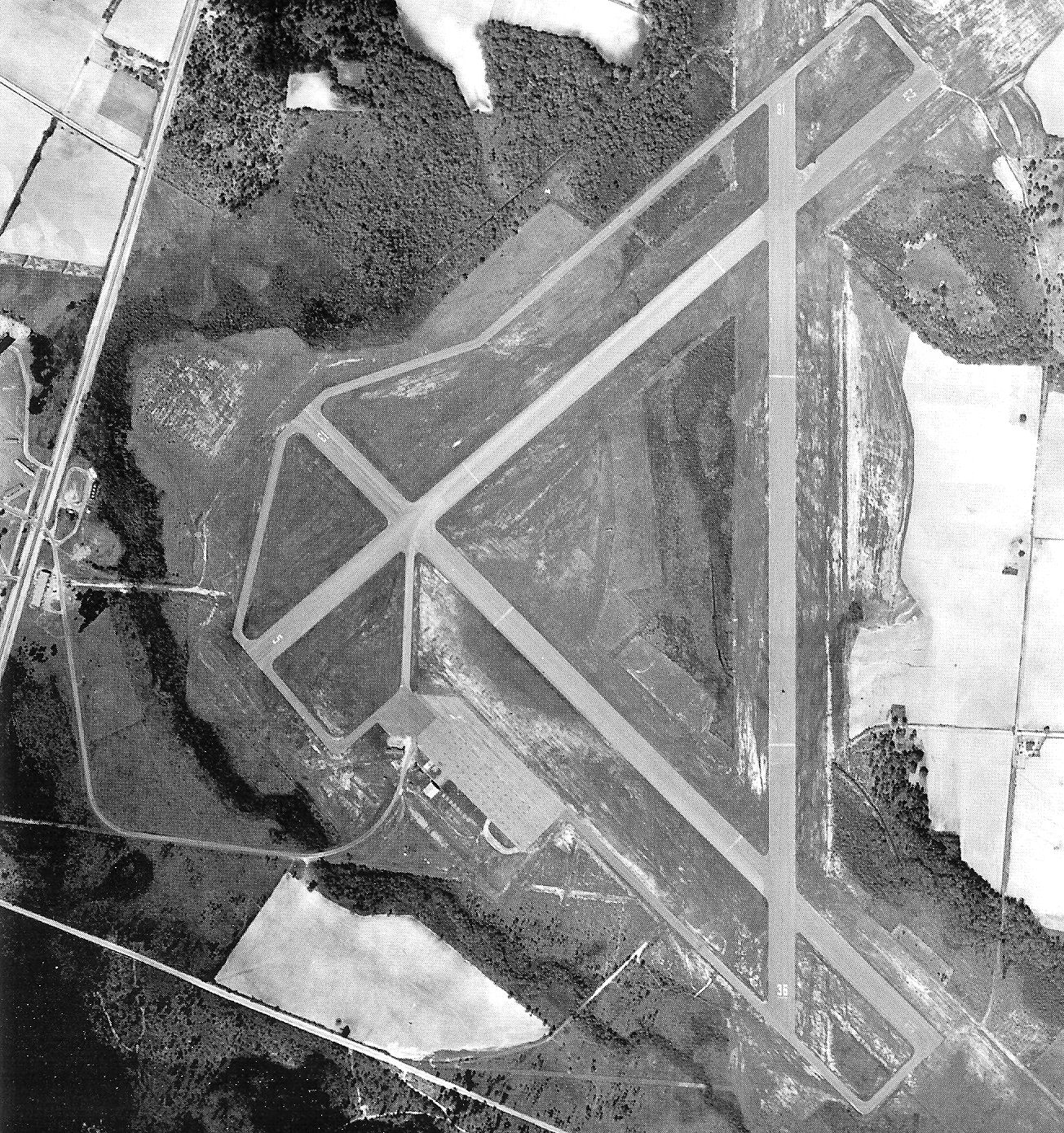
1943 airphoto

The AAF placed Statesboro Army Air Field under the command of Third Air Force making it a subbase of Morris Field at Charlotte, North Carolina.

From March to June 1943, the airfield became a sub-base of William Northern Field at Tullahoma, Tennessee. In June, Statesboro returned to the jurisdiction of Morris, The 118th Reconnaissance Squadron (Fighter) arrived on June 23, 1943 from Morris. Four days later, the 23d Reconnaissance Squadron (Fighter) also followed from Morris. The 23rd and the 118th operated observation and lighter aircraft that included the P-39 Airacobra and P-40 Warhawk. Both squadrons were attached to the 66th Reconnaissance Group. After two months of training, the 23rd moved back to Morris and the 118th to Aiken Army Air Field, South Carolina.

When the reconnaissance units left, liaison units that primarily flew Stinson L-5 Sentinels were stationed at Statesboro for the remainder of the war. After a month and a half with no squadrons present, the 127th Liaison moved aboard from Morris AAF on October 13, 1943. Until December 1943, the 127th performed the training of replacement pilots. Several thousand people attended an air show, held on Sunday, December 5, for the purpose of Women's Army Corps recruiting. On February 2, the Army activated the 156th Liaison. The same month, the 14th Liaison arrived from Lebanon, Tennessee. One month later it shipped out for Europe.

May 1944 was a very busy month at Statesboro. First, the 161st Liaison activated on May 11. One week later, the 127th and the 156th Liaison transferred to Aiken AAF, South Carolina. Between May 31 and June 1, the squadrons of the 3d Air Commando Group - the 157th Liaison from Cox Field, Texas, the 159th Liaison from Pounds Field, Texas, and the 160th Liaison from Brownwood Army Air Field, Texas. Between August, 18 and 19, the 3rd Air Commando Group and its three squadrons moved to Cross City Army Air Field, Florida. Eventually, the 3rd Air Commando Group served in the South Pacific.

After October 1944, Statesboro did not host any other flying squadrons. The base became a POW camp and a sub-base of Raleigh-Durham Army Air Field, North Carolina. On December 31, 1944, Warner Robins Air Technical Service took command of Statesboro placing it on temporary inactive status. A staff of two officers and 25 civilians maintained the field.

=== Postwar civil use ===
In April 1946, after an inspection by the CAA, the Federal Government gave the City and the County permission to operate the airfield as a municipal airport. The arrangement included a fire truck, grass mowing tractors and other equipment.

In October 1946, Statesboro hoped to be part of a DC-3 route between Atlanta and Savannah applied for by the new Southern Airways; however, with a population under 10,000 and located less than 50 miles from Savannah, airline service never came to pass.

The War Asset Administration eventually deeded the airfield to the City and County; however, this deed did not include the cantonment area west of Highway 301. A provision of the deed also allowed the Federal government to use the field, if needed, without charge. In January 1947, the City and the County purchased the buildings of the cantonment area for the token fee of $6,400. The next month, Boshears Flying Service leased the airport to provide a fixed-base operation.

The Air Force returned to Statesboro in 1961 when a Strategic Air Command radar detachment operated at the airport. A few military built structures have survived.

== Cargo operations ==
| Airlines | Destinations |
|---|---|
| Martinaire for UPS Airlines | Columbia (SC) |

== See also ==
- Georgia World War II Army Airfields
- List of airports in Georgia (U.S. state)
