= WMCD =

- Rocky Ford, Georgia; United States
- Frequency: 106.5 MHz
- Branding: 106.5 The Boro

Programming
- Format: Country

Ownership
- Owner: Bryan Steele; (Foundry Broadcasting LLC)

History
- First air date: 1991
- Former call signs: WZBX (1991–2018)

Technical information
- Licensing authority: FCC
- Facility ID: 60213
- Class: C3
- ERP: 25,000 watts
- HAAT: 94.8 meters
- Transmitter coordinates: 32°43′57.00″N 81°51′43.00″W

Links
- Public license information: Public file; LMS

WMCD (106.5 FM) is a radio station broadcasting a country format. Licensed to Rocky Ford, Georgia, United States, the station is currently owned by Bryan Steele, through licensee Foundry Broadcasting LLC.
