= Newington, Georgia =

- Town
- Location in Screven County and the state of Georgia
- Coordinates: 32°35′21″N 81°30′16″W
- Country: United States
- State: Georgia
- County: Screven

Area
  - Total: 0.81 sq mi (2.10 km^{2})
  - Land: 0.81 sq mi (2.10 km^{2})
  - Water: 0 sq mi (0.00 km^{2})
- Elevation: 141 ft (43 m)

Population (2020)
  - Total: 290
  - Density: 357.8/sq mi (138.14/km^{2})
- Time zone: UTC-5 (Eastern (EST))
  - Summer (DST): UTC-4 (EDT)
- ZIP code: 30446
- Area code: 912
- FIPS code: 13-54992
- GNIS feature ID: 0332497
- Website: www.newingtonga.com

Newington is a town in Screven County, Georgia, United States. The population was 290 in 2020.

== Geography ==
Newington is located at 32°35′21″N 81°30′16″W.

Georgia State Routes 21 and 24 are the main routes through the town. SR 21 runs northwest–southeast as a four-lane divided highway to the west of downtown, leading northwest 14 mi (23 km) to Sylvania, the Screven County seat, and southeast 20 mi (32 km) to Springfield. SR 24 runs north–south through the downtown area as Oliver Highway, leading north 28 mi (45 km) to Hiltonia and southwest 23 mi (37 km) to Statesboro.

According to the United States Census Bureau, the town has a total area of 0.8 square miles (2.1 km^{2}), all land.

== Demographics ==
Historical population
Census	Pop.	Note	%±
1920	364		—
1930	366		0.5%
1940	366		0.0%
1950	429		17.2%
1960	399		−7.0%
1970	402		0.8%
1980	402		0.0%
1990	319		−20.6%
2000	322		0.9%
2010	274		−14.9%
2020	290		5.8%
U.S. Decennial Census; 1850-1870 1870-1880; 1890-1910 1920-1930; 1940 1950 1960; 1970 1980 1990; 2000

As of the census of 2000, there were 322 people, 137 households, and 89 families residing in the town. By 2020, its population declined to 290.
