= Halcyondale, Georgia =

Unincorporated community in Georgia, United States

Coordinates: 32°32′21″N 81°35′53″W

Halcyondale is an unincorporated community in Screven County, in the U.S. state of Georgia.

== History ==
A post office was established at Halcyondale in 1842, and remained in operation until 1957. The name Halcyondale is a coined one meaning "peaceful valley".
