= Screven County High School =

Location
- 110 Halcyondale Road; Sylvania, Georgia 30467; United States; 32.73788°N 81.63451°W

Information
- School type: Government public high school
- Motto: S-C-H-S (Students Creating High Standards)
- Denomination: Screven County School District
- Superintendent: Dr. Jim Thompson
- Director: John Hagan
- Principal: Billy Pollock
- Teaching staff: 42.90 (FTE)
- Grades: 9 – 12
- Gender: Co-ed
- Average class size: 28 Students
- Student to teacher ratio: 13.94
- Color
- Slogan: Everyone Matters, Everyone Learns, Everyone Succeeds.
- Sports: Varsity baseball, junior varsity baseball, softball, girls' track, boys' track, cross country, girls' tennis, boys' tennis, wrestling, basketball, competitive cheerleading, marching band
- Team name: Gamecocks
- Accreditation: Southern Association of Colleges and Schools
- Website: Website

Screven County High School is a public high school located in Sylvania, Georgia, United States. The school is part of the Screven County School System, which serves Screven County.

The school offers athletics, band, and a quizbowl team along with many clubs, such as Future Business Leaders of America (FBLA), Family Career and Community Leaders of America (FCCLA), National FFA Organization, Rotary Service Club, National Honor Society, Skills USA, Spanish Club, Student Government, Technology Student Association (TSA), Y-Club, and 4-H Club.

Billy Pollock is the principal. Kiersten Tapley and Kyle Reynolds are the assistant principals.

== Notable alumni ==
- Lee Berger (class of 1984), National Geographic paleontologist and explorer
- Macay McBride, former professional baseball player (Atlanta Braves, Detroit Tigers)
