= Deans Crossing, Georgia =

Unincorporated community in Georgia, U.S.

Coordinates: 32°05′34″N 81°54′18″W

Deans Crossing is an unincorporated community in Evans County, in the U.S. state of Georgia.

== History ==
A variant name was "Dean". A post office called Dean was established in 1894, and remained in operation until 1905. The community was named after Dean G. Hodges.
