= Willingway Hospital =

Willingway

Geography
- Location: Statesboro, Georgia, United States
- Coordinates: 32.44434°N 81.75774°W

History
- Founded: 1971

Links
- Website: www.willingway.com
- Lists: Hospitals in Georgia

Willingway, located in Statesboro, Georgia, is a privately owned Substance Use Disorder facility which specializes in treating alcoholism and drug addiction. The treatment modality at Willingway is based on the principles of the twelve-step program, Alcoholics Anonymous. It is referred to by many as "The Betty Ford Center of the South."

== Programs ==
Willingway offers the following levels of care:

- Detoxification – A patient is medically detoxed from all mood-changing chemicals in a unit similar to that of an intensive care unit at a general hospital. Willingway is equipped to successfully detox patients from notoriously difficult chemicals like Methadone, Oxycontin, Valium, and Xanax.
- Inpatient/Residential – After completing detox, patients are then moved to the second phase of treatment where they are given an individual counselor and begin to identify problems they may encounter on the path to long-term recovery as well as the solutions that accompany them. They learn to incorporate the principles of the AA program into all areas of their lives.
- Day Treatment/Partial Hospitalization – This modified version of the inpatient program is offered to those who do not necessarily require monitoring 24 hours a day but need more structure than is available to them in the outpatient program.
- Family Program – During the last five days of a patient's stay at Willingway, family members of the patient are encouraged to participate in the program with their loved one so they can learn more about the disease of alcoholism and drug addiction. Family therapy and special groups are an essential part of this experience.
- Intensive Outpatient – This level of care allows for the patient to live at home while receiving treatment. Patients go to evening group sessions and meet with a counselor on a weekly basis. As with the rest of Willingway's programs, the medical staff is actively involved in the treatment process.
- Individual Outpatient Counseling – Patients who no longer require the intensity of outpatient groups may continue to meet with their counselor on a one-on-one basis.
- Extended Treatment – For alcoholics and addicts that need more time to develop the skills required to maintain a lifetime of sobriety, long-term treatment programs are recommended. The "Women's Residence" and the "Men's Lodge" provide residents with individual and group counseling. Residents attend AA meetings and begin to apply what they learn into their daily lives.
- Continuing Care – Prior to leaving the care of Willingway Hospital, patients are given aftercare plans designed to help them maintain their recovery. While each plan is individual, all patients are encouraged to immerse themselves in the program of Alcoholics Anonymous or another twelve-step program in which they obtain a sponsor, go to meetings, and begin to work the twelve steps.

Patients are evaluated and placed in the level of care most appropriate for their needs. Each patient's program is completely individualized.

== Facts and figures ==
Willingway is licensed as a specialized hospital by the Georgia Department of Human Resources and is accredited by JCAHO. The average length of stay is 25.62 days. The number of annual admits totals at 512. Approximately 33% of all patients are female, and 12% are under the age of 25.

== History ==
Although Willingway was not established until 1971, its story began in 1959 when Dr. John Mooney and his wife Dot, recovering from alcoholism themselves, began taking alcoholics into their home in hopes of showing them a new way of life. Their hopes were realized, and seemingly hopeless men and women found themselves free from alcoholic bondage as a result of the care given to them by the doctor and his wife. As word spread about the Mooneys, it became evident that the house on Lee Street simply didn't have enough room for all those seeking treatment. As a result, they began building Willingway, a 40-bed facility. Willingway became a licensed hospital on August 11, 1971. John Mooney stepped down as Director of Willingway in 1982. However, the couple's four children, Al, Jimmy, Bobby, and Carol Lind still make up the hospital's board of directors. The oldest son, Al, is co-author of The Recovery Book, known by many as the Bible of addiction medicine. In May, 2016, it was announced that Willingway was being purchased by Summit BHC, a privately owned network of addiction treatment centers.

== Community ==
Many patients that go to Willingway stay in Statesboro and become active members of their community. Georgia Southern University, also located in Statesboro, GA, and the Willingway Foundation (Willingway's nonprofit organization) teamed up in an effort to create the Center for Addiction Recovery on Georgia Southern University's campus. The center provides all recovering alcoholics and drug addicts with the opportunity to maximize their college experience while minimizing their risk of relapse. The Center for Addiction Recovery is modeled after a federally funded program currently in place at Texas Tech University in Lubbock, Texas. The center offers scholarship opportunities, admissions guidance, 12-step meetings, and many other resources.
