= Maffin Bay =

Bay on the northern coast of New Guinea

Coordinates: 1.95°S 138.85°E

Maffin Bay, known as Teluk Maffin in Indonesian, is a small bay in the Pacific Ocean on the Northern coast of New Guinea. It is in Papua, Indonesia, below the Foja Mountains near Wakde, about 125 miles west of Jayapura. Maffin Bay was a landing site in the New Guinea campaign of World War II, and was the location of the Battle of Lone Tree Hill. After this battle, Maffin Bay was held by Task Force Tornado and defended it against Japanese attacks through the use of aggressive patrolling.
