= Jacksonboro, Georgia =

Ghost town in Screven County, Georgia, United States

Coordinates: 32°49′21″N 81°37′22″W

Jacksonboro is a ghost town in Screven County, in the U.S. state of Georgia.

== History ==
A variant name is "Jacksonborough". The community was named after James Jackson (1757–1806), Revolutionary War soldier, Georgia Congressman, Senator and Governor.

Jacksonboro served as the original seat of Screven County. The county seat was transferred to Sylvania in 1847.

Little remains of the original community besides the old Seaborn Goodall House.
