= Millhaven, Georgia =

Unincorporated community in Georgia, United States

Coordinates: 32°56′02″N 81°38′58″W

Millhaven is an unincorporated community in Screven County, in the U.S. state of Georgia. In 2007 the population was estimated to be around 434 people.

== History ==
The community was named for a mill which stood on the banks of Brier Creek. The name is sometimes spelled out as "Mill Haven". A post office called Mill Haven was established in 1825, and remained in operation until 1967.
