= Cox Field =

Airport in Texas, United States

Cox Field Cox Army Airfield
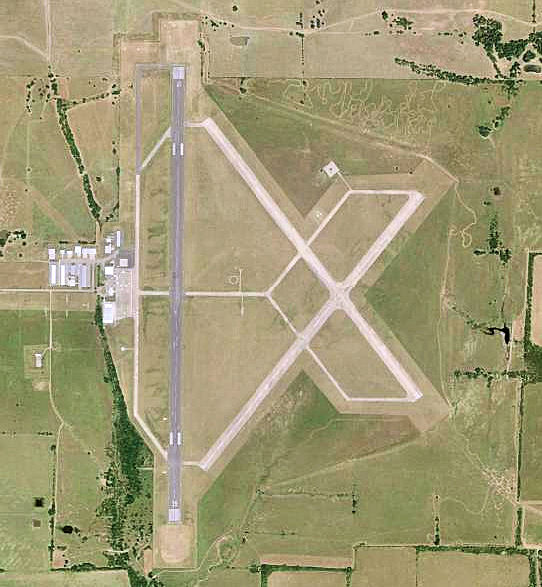
- USGS image, 2006
- IATA: PRX; ICAO: KPRX; FAA LID: PRX

Summary
- Airport type: Public
- Owner: City of Paris
- Serves: Paris, Texas
- Elevation AMSL: 547 ft (167 m)
- Coordinates: 33°38′12″N 095°27′03″W

Map
- Location within Texas Location within the United States

Runways
Direction	Length		Surface
Direction	ft	m	Surface
3/21	4,624	1,409	Concrete
14/32	4,624	1,409	Concrete
17/35	6,002	1,829	Asphalt

Helipads
Number	Length		Surface
Number	ft	m	Surface
H1	40	12	Concrete

Statistics (2007)
- Aircraft operations: 8,050
- Based aircraft: 50
- Source: Federal Aviation Administration

Cox Field (IATA: PRX, ICAO: KPRX, FAA LID: PRX) is an airport seven miles east of Paris, in Lamar County, Texas. It is owned by the city of Paris but is operated and maintained by J.R. Aviation, the airport's fixed-base operator (FBO).

== History ==
The airport opened in August 1943 as Cox Army Airfield and was used by Second Air Force, United States Army Air Forces, primarily for liaison pilot training. The 157th Liaison Squadron was based here from March to May 1944. From 15 May to 8 October 1944 advanced liaison pilot training was conducted by the 163d liaison squadron, who prepared pilots as combat replacements for AAF liaison squadrons operating overseas. From October 1944 onward, the airfield was used by the Air Technical Service Command as an aircraft maintenance and supply depot. At the end of the war the airfield was not needed by the military and was turned over to the local government for civil use.

=== Historical airline service ===
Mid-Continent Airlines began landing at Paris in 1947 as a stop on a route between Houston and Tulsa using Douglas DC-3 aircraft. In 1952 Mid-Continent merged into Braniff International Airways which lengthened the route northbound from Tulsa all the way to Minneapolis with multiple stops including Kansas City and Omaha. Braniff soon discontinued service by 1953.

Central Airlines began service in 1950 with Beechcraft Bonanzas, followed by Douglas DC-3s on flights to Dallas, Kansas City, and St. Louis, all making stops en route. Central merged into the original Frontier Airlines in 1967 which continued service using Convair 580 aircraft until January, 1977.

SMB Stage Lines served Paris from 1968 until early 1975 with flights to Dallas and Tulsa using Beechcraft 99 airliners.

There was no service at Paris from 1977 until 1979 when Metro Airlines began flights to Dallas/Fort Worth using de Havilland Canada DHC-6 Twin Otter aircraft. Metro's service ended in 1984 and Eagle Commuter succeeded providing flights to DFW for a period in 1985.

Exec Express began service in 1987 with flights to DFW using Piper Navajo and Beechcraft 99 airliners. Exec Express changed its name to Lone Star Airlines in 1991 and service continued using Fairchild Swearingen Metroliners until 1997. Paris, TX has not seen scheduled air service since then.

== Facilities ==
Cox Field covers 1,537 acres (622 ha) at an elevation of 547 feet (167 m). It has three runways: 3/21 and 14/32 are each 4,624 by 150 feet (1,409 x 46 m) concrete and 17/35 is 6,002 by 150 feet (1,829 x 46 m) asphalt. It has one concrete helipad 40 by 40 feet (12 x 12 m).

In the year ending April 30, 2007 the airport had 8,050 aircraft operations, average 22 per day: 93% general aviation, 4% air taxi, and 3% military. 50 aircraft were then based at the airport: 86% single-engine, 8% multi-engine, 4% jet and 2% helicopter.

== See also ==
- Texas World War II Army Airfields
- List of airports in Texas
