= Oliver, Georgia =

- City
- Location in Screven County and the state of Georgia
- Coordinates: 32°31′20″N 81°31′57″W
- Country: United States
- State: Georgia
- County: Screven

Area
  - Total: 0.94 sq mi (2.43 km^{2})
  - Land: 0.93 sq mi (2.41 km^{2})
  - Water: 0.0077 sq mi (0.02 km^{2})
- Elevation: 115 ft (35 m)

Population (2020)
  - Total: 210
  - Density: 226/sq mi (87.3/km^{2})
- Time zone: UTC-5 (Eastern (EST))
  - Summer (DST): UTC-4 (EDT)
- ZIP code: 30449
- Area code: 912
- FIPS code: 13-58100
- GNIS feature ID: 0332571
- Website: https://cityofoliverga.gov/

Oliver is a city in Screven County, Georgia, United States. The population was 210 as of 2020.

== Geography ==
Oliver is located at 32°31′20″N 81°31′57″W (32.522176, -81.532458).

According to the United States Census Bureau, the city has a total area of 0.9 square miles (2.3 km^{2}), all land.

== Demographics ==
Historical population
| Census | Pop. | Note | %± |
|---|---|---|---|
| 1910 | 243 | | — |
| 1920 | 288 | | 18.5% |
| 1930 | 242 | | −16.0% |
| 1940 | 211 | | −12.8% |
| 1950 | 223 | | 5.7% |
| 1960 | 192 | | −13.9% |
| 1970 | 217 | | 13.0% |
| 1980 | 239 | | 10.1% |
| 1990 | 242 | | 1.3% |
| 2000 | 253 | | 4.5% |
| 2010 | 239 | | −5.5% |
| 2020 | 210 | | −12.1% |
U.S. Decennial Census; 1850-1870 1870-1880; 1890-1910 1920-1930; 1940 1950 1960; 1970 1980 1990; 2000 2010 2020

=== Racial and ethnic composition ===
Oliver city, Georgia – Racial and ethnic composition Note: the US Census treats Hispanic/Latino as an ethnic category. This table excludes Latinos from the racial categories and assigns them to a separate category. Hispanics/Latinos may be of any race.
| Race / Ethnicity (NH = Non-Hispanic) | Pop 2000 | Pop 2010 | Pop 2020 | % 2000 | % 2010 | 2020 |
|---|---|---|---|---|---|---|
| White alone (NH) | 115 | 108 | 101 | 45.45% | 45.19% | 48.10% |
| Black or African American alone (NH) | 128 | 127 | 103 | 50.59% | 53.14% | 49.05% |
| Native American or Alaska Native alone (NH) | 0 | 0 | 0 | 0.00% | 0.00% | 0.00% |
| Asian alone (NH) | 1 | 0 | 0 | 0.40% | 0.00% | 0.00% |
| Native Hawaiian or Pacific Islander alone (NH) | 0 | 0 | 0 | 0.00% | 0.00% | 0.00% |
| Other race alone (NH) | 0 | 0 | 0 | 0.00% | 0.00% | 0.00% |
| Mixed race or Multiracial (NH) | 2 | 2 | 3 | 0.79% | 0.84% | 1.43% |
| Hispanic or Latino (any race) | 7 | 2 | 3 | 2.77% | 0.84% | 1.43% |
| Total | 253 | 239 | 210 | 100.00% | 100.00% | 100.00% |

=== 2000 census ===
As of the census of 2000, there were 253 people, 97 households, and 76 families residing in the city. By 2020, its population declined to 210.
