= Rocky Ford, Georgia =

- Town
- Location in Screven County and the state of Georgia
- Coordinates: 32°39′51″N 81°49′42″W
- Country: United States
- State: Georgia
- County: Screven

Area
  - Total: 1.24 sq mi (3.21 km^{2})
  - Land: 1.21 sq mi (3.14 km^{2})
  - Water: 0.027 sq mi (0.07 km^{2})
- Elevation: 130 ft (40 m)

Population (2020)
  - Total: 167
  - Density: 137.9/sq mi (53.25/km^{2})
- Time zone: UTC-5 (Eastern (EST))
  - Summer (DST): UTC-4 (EDT)
- ZIP code: 30455
- Area code: 912
- FIPS code: 13-66444
- GNIS feature ID: 0321840

Rocky Ford is a town in Screven County, Georgia, United States. The population was 167 at the 2020 census.

== History ==
The community was named after a rocky ford over the nearby Ogeechee River.

== Geography ==
Rocky Ford is located at 32°39′51″N 81°49′42″W (32.664231, -81.828224).

According to the United States Census Bureau, the town has a total area of 1.2 square miles (3.1 km^{2}), of which 1.2 square miles (3.1 km^{2}) is land and 0.04 square miles (0.10 km^{2}) (2.42%) is water.

== Demographics ==
Historical population
Census	Pop.	Note	%±
1910	385		—
1920	522		35.6%
1930	370		−29.1%
1940	320		−13.5%
1950	278		−13.1%
1960	241		−13.3%
1970	252		4.6%
1980	223		−11.5%
1990	197		−11.7%
2000	186		−5.6%
2010	144		−22.6%
2020	167		16.0%
U.S. Decennial Census; 1850-1870 1870-1880; 1890-1910 1920-1930; 1940 1950 1960; 1970 1980 1990; 2000

As of the census of 2000, there were 186 people, 78 households, and 53 families residing in the town. By 2020, its population declined to 167.

In 2000, there were 78 households, out of which 23.1% had children under the age of 18 living with them, 52.6% were married couples living together, 14.1% had a female householder with no husband present, and 30.8% were non-families. 29.5% of all households were made up of individuals, and 21.8% had someone living alone who was 65 years of age or older. The average household size was 2.38 and the average family size was 2.94.

In the town in 2000, the population was spread out, with 21.5% under the age of 18, 5.9% from 18 to 24, 23.1% from 25 to 44, 28.5% from 45 to 64, and 21.0% who were 65 years of age or older. The median age was 44 years. For every 100 females, there were 84.2 males. For every 100 females age 18 and over, there were 80.2 males.

As of 2000, the median income for a household in the town was $25,000, and the median income for a family was $28,750. Males had a median income of $28,125 versus $21,719 for females. The per capita income for the town was $12,989. About 4.2% of families and 9.3% of the population were below the poverty line, including 18.8% of those under the age of eighteen and 10.5% of those 65 or over.

== See also ==
- List of towns in Georgia (U.S. state)
