= Hiltonia, Georgia =

- City
- Location in Screven County and the state of Georgia
- Coordinates: 32°52′56″N 81°39′34″W
- Country: United States
- State: Georgia
- County: Screven

Area
  - Total: 1.74 sq mi (4.51 km^{2})
  - Land: 1.72 sq mi (4.46 km^{2})
  - Water: 0.019 sq mi (0.05 km^{2})
- Elevation: 180 ft (55 m)

Population (2020)
  - Total: 310
  - Density: 180.1/sq mi (69.52/km^{2})
- Time zone: UTC-5 (Eastern (EST))
  - Summer (DST): UTC-4 (EDT)
- ZIP code: 30467
- Area code: 912
- FIPS code: 13-38920
- GNIS feature ID: 0356311
- Website: https://www.townofhiltonia.com/

Hiltonia is a city in Screven County, Georgia, United States. The population was 310 in 2020.

== Geography ==
According to the United States Census Bureau, the city has a total area of 1.7 square miles (4.4 km^{2}), of which 1.7 square miles (4.4 km^{2}) is land and 0.57% is water.

== Demographics ==
Historical population
Census	Pop.	Note	%±
1920	262		—
1930	226		−13.7%
1940	246		8.8%
1950	318		29.3%
1960	353		11.0%
1970	294		−16.7%
1980	515		75.2%
1990	402		−21.9%
2000	421		4.7%
2010	342		−18.8%
2020	310		−9.4%
U.S. Decennial Census; 1850-1870 1870-1880; 1890-1910 1920-1930; 1940 1950 1960; 1970 1980 1990; 2000 2010 2020

Hiltonia first appeared in the 1920 U.S. census.

=== Racial and ethnic composition ===
Hiltonia town, Georgia – Racial and ethnic composition Note: the US Census treats Hispanic/Latino as an ethnic category. This table excludes Latinos from the racial categories and assigns them to a separate category. Hispanics/Latinos may be of any race.
Race / Ethnicity (NH = Non-Hispanic)	Pop 2000	Pop 2010	Pop 2020	% 2000	% 2010	% 2020
White alone (NH)	122	109	114	28.98%	31.87%	36.77%
Black or African American alone (NH)	294	226	188	69.83%	66.08%	60.65%
Native American or Alaska Native alone (NH)	1	0	1	0.24%	0.00%	0.32%
Asian alone (NH)	3	0	0	0.71%	0.00%	0.00%
Native Hawaiian or Pacific Islander alone (NH)	0	0	0	0.00%	0.00%	0.00%
Other race alone (NH)	0	0	0	0.00%	0.00%	0.00%
Mixed race or Multiracial (NH)	1	4	4	0.24%	1.17%	1.29%
Hispanic or Latino (any race)	0	3	3	0.00%	0.88%	0.97%
Total	421	342	310	100.00%	100.00%	100.00%

=== 2000 census ===
As of the census of 2000, there were 421 people, 134 households, and 101 families residing in the city. By 2020, its population was 310.
