= Screven County, Georgia =

County in Georgia, United States

- County
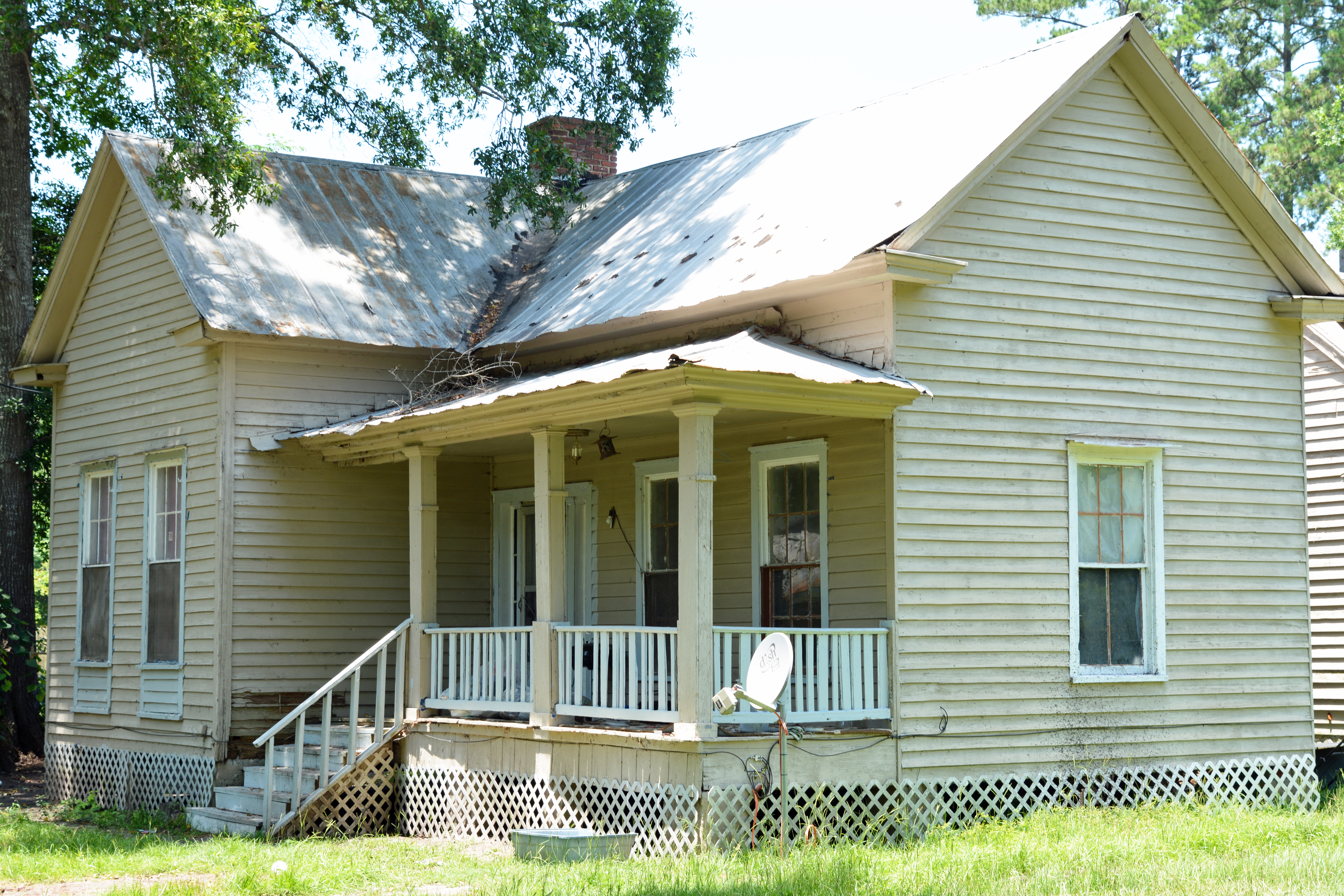
- Harris-Murrow-Trowell House in Oliver.

- Location within the U.S. state of Georgia
- Coordinates: 32°45′N 81°37′W
- Country: United States
- State: Georgia
- Founded: December 14, 1793; 232 years ago
- Named for: James Screven
- Seat: Sylvania
- Largest city: Sylvania

Area
  - Total: 656 sq mi (1,700 km^{2})
  - Land: 645 sq mi (1,670 km^{2})
  - Water: 11 sq mi (28 km^{2}) 1.6%

Population (2020)
  - Total: 14,067
  - Estimate (2025): 14,408 ▲
  - Density: 21.8/sq mi (8.42/km^{2})
- Time zone: UTC−5 (Eastern)
  - Summer (DST): UTC−4 (EDT)
- Congressional district: 12th
- Website: www.screvencountyboc.com

Screven County is a county located in the southeastern part of the U.S. state of Georgia. As of the 2020 census, the population was 14,067. The county seat is Sylvania.

== History ==
The county was created on December 14, 1793, and was named for brigadier general James Screven, who died fighting in Georgia during the American Revolutionary War. Some wartime accounts used the alternate spelling of "Scriven" for the general, and the county's name was often spelled that way in its early history, as reflected on 19th-century Georgia maps.

Sylvania became the county seat in 1847, moved from Jacksonborough, by an act of State legislation. The Screven County Courthouse, built in 1964, is the fourth courthouse to serve Screven County.

== Geography ==
According to the U.S. Census Bureau, the county has a total area of 656 square miles (1,700 km^{2}), of which 645 square miles (1,670 km^{2}) is land and 11 square miles (28 km^{2}) (1.6%) is water. The Savannah River borders the eastern side of the county, and the Ogeechee River borders the southwest portion. Elevation varies to around 40 feet on the Savannah river to 320 feet at the Bay Branch community, located a few miles west of Sylvania. Pine, oak, dogwood, and other trees prevalent to the South can be found in Screven County.

The very northern portion of Screven County, defined by a line running from Girard southeast and parallel to State Route 24 to the South Carolina border, is located in the Middle Savannah River sub-basin of the Savannah River basin. A north-central section of the county, from Sylvania north and centered on Hiltonia, is located in the Brier Creek sub-basin of the same Savannah River basin. The southern portion of Screven County, from Newington running northwest through Sylvania, is located in the Upper Ogeechee River sub-basin of the Ogeechee River basin. The remaining southeastern corner of the county is located in the Lower Savannah River sub-basin of the larger Savannah River basin.

=== Major highways ===
- US 301
  - US 301 Bus.
- SR 17
- SR 21
  - SR 21 Bus.
- SR 24
- SR 73
  - SR 73 Loop

=== Adjacent counties ===
- Allendale County, South Carolina (north)
- Hampton County, South Carolina (east)
- Effingham County (southeast)
- Bulloch County (southwest)
- Jenkins County (west)
- Burke County (northwest)

== Communities ==
=== Cities ===
- Hiltonia
- Oliver
- Sylvania

=== Towns ===
- Newington
- Rocky Ford

=== Unincorporated ===
- Cooperville
- Dover
- Halcyondale
- Millhaven

== Demographics ==
Historical population
Census	Pop.	Note	%±
1800	3,019		—
1810	4,477		48.3%
1820	3,941		−12.0%
1830	4,776		21.2%
1840	4,794		0.4%
1850	6,847		42.8%
1860	8,274		20.8%
1870	9,175		10.9%
1880	12,786		39.4%
1890	14,424		12.8%
1900	19,252		33.5%
1910	20,202		4.9%
1920	23,552		16.6%
1930	20,503		−12.9%
1940	20,353		−0.7%
1950	18,000		−11.6%
1960	14,919		−17.1%
1970	12,591		−15.6%
1980	14,043		11.5%
1990	13,842		−1.4%
2000	15,374		11.1%
2010	14,593		−5.1%
2020	14,067		−3.6%
2025 (est.)	14,408	▲	2.4%
U.S. Decennial Census; 1790-1880 1890-1910; 1920-1930 1930-1940; 1940-1950 1960-1980; 1980-2000 2010 2020

=== Racial and ethnic composition ===
Screven County, Georgia – Racial and ethnic composition Note: the US Census treats Hispanic/Latino as an ethnic category. This table excludes Latinos from the racial categories and assigns them to a separate category. Hispanics/Latinos may be of any race.
Race / Ethnicity (NH = Non-Hispanic)	Pop 1980	Pop 1990	Pop 2000	Pop 2010	Pop 2020	% 1980	% 1990	% 2000	% 2010	% 2020
White alone (NH)	7,607	7,569	8,182	7,898	8,018	54.17%	54.68%	53.22%	54.12%	57.00%
Black or African American alone (NH)	6,257	6,197	6,923	6,283	5,285	44.56%	44.77%	45.03%	43.05%	37.57%
Native American or Alaska Native alone (NH)	3	13	19	33	39	0.02%	0.09%	0.12%	0.23%	0.28%
Asian alone (NH)	15	11	40	56	61	0.11%	0.08%	0.26%	0.38%	0.43%
Native Hawaiian or Pacific Islander alone (NH)	x	x	1	1	3	x	x	0.01%	0.01%	0.02%
Other race alone (NH)	8	1	4	3	31	0.06%	0.01%	0.03%	0.02%	0.22%
Mixed race or Multiracial (NH)	x	x	58	139	343	x	x	0.38%	0.95%	2.44%
Hispanic or Latino (any race)	153	51	147	180	287	1.09%	0.37%	0.96%	1.23%	2.04%
Total	14,043	13,842	15,374	14,593	14,067	100.00%	100.00%	100.00%	100.00%	100.00%

=== 2020 census ===
As of the 2020 census, the county had a population of 14,067, 5,646 households, and 3,395 families residing in the county. The median age was 43.2 years, with 22.6% of residents under the age of 18 and 21.0% aged 65 or older.

For every 100 females there were 95.3 males, and for every 100 females age 18 and over there were 92.0 males. 0.0% of residents lived in urban areas, while 100.0% lived in rural areas.

The racial makeup of the county was 57.5% White, 37.7% African American, 0.4% American Indian and Alaska Native, 0.4% Asian, 0.1% Native Hawaiian and Pacific Islander, 0.8% from some other race, and 3.2% from two or more races. Hispanic or Latino residents of any race comprised 2.0% of the population.

There were 5,646 households in the county, of which 29.3% had children under the age of 18 living with them and 31.9% had a female householder with no spouse or partner present. About 29.3% of all households were made up of individuals and 15.2% had someone living alone who was 65 years of age or older.

There were 6,500 housing units, of which 13.1% were vacant. Among occupied housing units, 71.9% were owner-occupied and 28.1% were renter-occupied. The homeowner vacancy rate was 1.3% and the rental vacancy rate was 7.5%.

== Politics ==
As of the 2020s, Screven County is a Republican stronghold, voting 62.5% for Donald Trump in 2024. With the exception of 1928, Democrats carried the county in every election up until 1960. Jimmy Carter and Bill Clinton both carried the county twice. Since 2000, the county always votes with the Republicans.

For elections to the United States House of Representatives, Screven County is part of Georgia's 12th congressional district, currently represented by Rick Allen. For elections to the Georgia State Senate, Screven County is part of District 23. For elections to the Georgia House of Representatives, Screven County is part of district 159.

United States presidential election results for Screven County, Georgia
Year	Republican		Democratic		Third party(ies)	
Year	No.	%	No.	%	No.	%
1912	138	22.29%	460	74.31%	21	3.39%
1916	98	12.91%	625	82.35%	36	4.74%
1920	260	28.92%	639	71.08%	0	0.00%
1924	288	25.15%	821	71.70%	36	3.14%
1928	706	70.18%	300	29.82%	0	0.00%
1932	46	8.26%	508	91.20%	3	0.54%
1936	61	6.05%	933	92.47%	15	1.49%
1940	100	7.82%	1,174	91.79%	5	0.39%
1944	197	18.04%	895	81.96%	0	0.00%
1948	172	11.37%	838	55.39%	503	33.25%
1952	692	30.40%	1,584	69.60%	0	0.00%
1956	521	28.12%	1,332	71.88%	0	0.00%
1960	957	39.11%	1,490	60.89%	0	0.00%
1964	2,260	60.98%	1,446	39.02%	0	0.00%
1968	916	22.04%	1,411	33.94%	1,830	44.02%
1972	2,402	80.69%	575	19.31%	0	0.00%
1976	1,176	35.17%	2,168	64.83%	0	0.00%
1980	1,490	40.67%	2,117	57.78%	57	1.56%
1984	2,583	59.65%	1,747	40.35%	0	0.00%
1988	2,178	59.52%	1,461	39.93%	20	0.55%
1992	1,705	39.05%	1,940	44.43%	721	16.51%
1996	1,862	44.13%	2,087	49.47%	270	6.40%
2000	2,461	52.15%	2,233	47.32%	25	0.53%
2004	3,360	56.68%	2,534	42.75%	34	0.57%
2008	3,423	52.77%	3,024	46.62%	40	0.62%
2012	3,287	53.79%	2,774	45.39%	50	0.82%
2016	3,305	57.83%	2,300	40.24%	110	1.92%
2020	3,915	59.06%	2,661	40.14%	53	0.80%
2024	4,325	62.50%	2,581	37.30%	14	0.20%

|- |}

United States Senate election results for Screven County, Georgia2
Year	Republican		Democratic		Third party(ies)	
Year	No.	%	No.	%	No.	%
2020	3,893	59.46%	2,589	39.54%	65	0.99%
2020	3,509	59.30%	2,408	40.70%	0	0.00%

United States Senate election results for Screven County, Georgia3
Year	Republican		Democratic		Third party(ies)	
Year	No.	%	No.	%	No.	%
2020	2,078	32.17%	1,685	26.08%	2,697	41.75%
2020	3,916	59.54%	2,661	40.46%	0	0.00%
2022	3,203	60.61%	2,009	38.01%	73	1.38%
2022	2,987	61.00%	1,910	39.00%	0	0.00%

Georgia Gubernatorial election results for Screven County
Year	Republican		Democratic		Third party(ies)	
Year	No.	%	No.	%	No.	%
2022	3,422	64.41%	1,872	35.23%	19	0.36%

== Education ==
Public education is provided by the Screven County School District. Schools include the Screven County Elementary School, Screven County Middle School, and Screven County High School.

== Notable people ==
- John Abbot, naturalist, entomologist, wrote The Natural History of the Rarer Lepidopterous Insects of Georgia
- Lee Rogers Berger, explorer, paleoanthropologist
- Edward Junius Black, member of the United States House of Representatives (1839–1841; 1842–1845)
- Bucky Dent, New York Yankees shortstop (born in Savannah) but spent his early years in Sylvania
- Francys Johnson, senior NAACP official
- Macay McBride, Major League Baseball pitcher
- John R. McKinney, Georgia's most decorated World War II hero
- Louie De Votie Newton, pastor and president of the Southern Baptist Convention
- Sam Sommers, former NASCAR Driver, former Georgia Late Model Racing Champion, and Georgia Racing Hall of Fame member

== See also ==
- National Register of Historic Places listings in Screven County, Georgia
- List of counties in Georgia
