= Sylvania, Georgia =

- City
- Nickname: "The Welcome Station City"
- Motto(s): "The Azalea & Dogwood City"
- Location in Screven County and the state of Georgia
- Coordinates: 32°45′1″N 81°38′23″W
- Country: United States
- State: Georgia
- County: Screven

Area
  - Total: 5.05 sq mi (13.08 km^{2})
  - Land: 4.98 sq mi (12.89 km^{2})
  - Water: 0.073 sq mi (0.19 km^{2})
- Elevation: 230 ft (70 m)

Population (2020)
  - Total: 2,634
  - Density: 529.2/sq mi (204.31/km^{2})
- Time zone: UTC-5 (Eastern (EST))
  - Summer (DST): UTC-4 (EDT)
- ZIP code: 30467
- Area code: 912
- FIPS code: 13-75160
- GNIS feature ID: 0323862
- Website: City of Sylvania Georgia

Sylvania is a city in and the county seat of Screven County, Georgia, United States. The population was 2,634 in 2020.

== History ==
The area was inhabited for thousands of years by various cultures of indigenous peoples. By the time of European encounter, it was occupied by the Yuchi peoples, but some Creeks, the Uchee's allies, moved into the area during Colonial times.

The town of Sylvania was founded in 1790 by settlers migrating to the area after the American Revolutionary War. The word "Sylvania" comes from the Latin word sylvan or sylva which means "forest land" or "place in the woods."

Sylvania was part of the Black Belt of Georgia, developed for cultivation after the invention of the cotton gin made it easier to handle short-fiber cotton. Cotton was the most important commodity crop until late in the 19th century. Planters imported many enslaved African Americans to cultivate the crops. By 1830, the county was filled with people. The county seat was moved from Jacksonborough to Sylvania in 1847.

As part of the projects of the Works Progress Administration, federally commissioned murals were produced from 1934 to 1943 in the United States through the Section of Painting and Sculpture, later called the Section of Fine Arts, of the Treasury Department. In 1941, Caroline Speare Rohland painted a mural for the post office of Sylvania. The scene depicted was of a farming family and their African American farm hand. In the 1980s, complaints from the local NAACP chapter resulted in the removal of the mural. It was found in a closet of the post office in 1995 and restored. The mural is now on permanent loan from the federal government and is held by Georgia Southern University in Statesboro.

Sherman's army moved through the area during the Civil War.

Sylvania calls itself the "Azalea and Dogwood City" and the "Welcome Station City."

== Geography ==
Sylvania is located at 32°45′01″N 81°38′23″W.

U.S. Route 301 and Georgia State Route 21 are the main routes through the city. U.S. 301 runs north–south as a western bypass of the downtown area, leading northeast 29 mi (47 km) to Allendale, South Carolina and southwest 23 mi (37 km) to Statesboro. GA-21 runs along the western bypass of the city concurrent with U.S. 301, leading southeast 34 mi (55 km) to Springfield and west 19 mi (31 km) to Millen. Additionally, Georgia State Route 73 runs through the downtown area upon splitting from U.S. 301 south of downtown, but rejoins that route north of the city.

The city is located roughly halfway between the major cities of Savannah and Augusta.

According to the United States Census Bureau, the city has a total area of 3.8 square miles (9.8 km^{2}), all land. Sylvania's elevation is 230 feet and is slightly higher than most of the land throughout Screven County.

The city's flora include pine, oak, and most notably, dogwood, thus the slogan "The Dogwood City." Although Spanish moss is not as prevalent as in nearby Savannah, it can still be seen in Sylvania and the surrounding countryside.

== Demographics ==
Historical population
Census	Pop.	Note	%±
1880	314		—
1890	338		7.6%
1900	545		61.2%
1910	1,400		156.9%
1920	1,413		0.9%
1930	1,781		26.0%
1940	2,531		42.1%
1950	2,939		16.1%
1960	3,469		18.0%
1970	3,199		−7.8%
1980	3,352		4.8%
1990	2,871		−14.3%
2000	2,675		−6.8%
2010	2,956		10.5%
2020	2,634		−10.9%
U.S. Decennial Census; 1850-1870 1870-1880; 1890-1910 1920-1930; 1940 1950 1960; 1970 1980 1990; 2000

=== 2020 census ===
As of the 2020 census, Sylvania had a population of 2,634. The median age was 44.5 years. 23.0% of residents were under the age of 18 and 23.5% of residents were 65 years of age or older. For every 100 females there were 83.9 males, and for every 100 females age 18 and over there were 79.9 males age 18 and over.

0.0% of residents lived in urban areas, while 100.0% lived in rural areas.

There were 1,076 households in Sylvania, of which 27.4% had children under the age of 18 living in them. Of all households, 35.1% were married-couple households, 18.8% were households with a male householder and no spouse or partner present, and 40.5% were households with a female householder and no spouse or partner present. About 33.5% of all households were made up of individuals and 17.8% had someone living alone who was 65 years of age or older. As of the 2020 census, 672 families resided in the city.

There were 1,244 housing units, of which 13.5% were vacant. The homeowner vacancy rate was 4.7% and the rental vacancy rate was 10.8%.

Sylvania racial composition as of 2020
Race	Num.	Perc.
White (non-Hispanic)	1,254	47.61%
Black or African American (non-Hispanic)	1,175	44.61%
Native American	4	0.15%
Asian	36	1.37%
Pacific Islander	1	0.04%
Other/Mixed	98	3.72%
Hispanic or Latino	66	2.51%

== Arts and culture ==
=== Annual events ===
Sylvania hosts an Annual Livestock Festival in April.

== Education ==
The Screven County School District holds grades pre-school to grade 12 and consists of one elementary school, a middle school and a high school (Screven County High School). The district has 186 full-time teachers and over 3,130 students. Dr. Jim Thompson is the superintendent.

== Notable people ==
- William Lovett Anderson, U.S. Navy Rear Admiral and Navy Cross recipient
- Bob Waters, American football player, coach and college administrator
