= Welcome centers in the United States =

Buildings located at either entrances to states or major ports of entry

Welcome centers, also commonly known as visitors' centers, visitor information centers, or tourist information centers, are buildings located at either entrances to states on major ports of entry, such as interstates or major highways, e.g. U.S. Routes or state highways, or in strategic cities within regions of a state, e.g. Southern California, Southwest Colorado, East Tennessee, or the South County region of Rhode Island. These welcome centers, which first opened on May 4, 1935 next to U.S. Route 12 in New Buffalo, Michigan, are locations that serve as a rest area for motorists, a source of information for tourists or new residents that enter a state or a region of a state, and a showcase for the state. These features make welcome centers, visitors centers, and service plazas, which are similar to welcome centers, distinct from rest areas. In Alaska and Hawaii, their unique geographical locations preclude them from having welcome centers as known in the rest of the U.S.

== Nomenclature ==
Welcome centers can be thought as covering several different concepts: state-owned and operated welcome centers near a state's border, state or municipal-owned and operated visitors centers in cities or rural areas, and service plazas on toll roads, e.g. the New Jersey Turnpike or MassPike, that are either state-owned and -operated, state-owned but operated by a private company, or privately owned and operated. (Visitors' centers in cities can either be owned and operated by the state, a county, a municipality, a local Chamber of Commerce, or be a joint effort between a county and/or a city and a Chamber of Commerce to support and publicize a well-known tourist district, city, or region.) States have different ways of naming welcome centers, but some of the most common ones are welcome centers, visitors centers, or visitors information centers.

== Locations ==
The welcome centers are normally located the first few exits into a state, e.g. Exit 2 on I-84 in Connecticut entering from New York State. However, some welcome centers, visitors' centers, or service plazas are located some distance away from a state's border, serving certain cities, e.g. Johnson City, Tennessee or Oceanside, California's local Chamber of Commerce, major cities, such as New Orleans, Louisiana, or well-known tourist districts, such as the Pigeon Forge, Tennessee tourist district.

== Facilities ==
The welcome centers and service plazas usually consist of a large building or buildings with public restroom facilities, free brochures relating to nearby attractions, lodging, and dining, a free official state highway map updated at regular intervals, staffed desks for people to ask for assistance, picnic areas, nearby restaurants or onsite dining facilities, gas stations, and large parking lots. In addition to the aforementioned, there is normally a large flagpole with the state flag in front of the welcome center.

In large cities like New Orleans or San Francisco, smaller cities like Astoria, Oregon or Vicksburg, Mississippi, as well as rural areas, visitor centers may be in a building of varied size with most of the above amenities included, i.e. restroom facilities, staffed desks for people to ask for assistance, nearby restaurants, free brochures relating to nearby attractions, lodging, and dining. In addition, an urban or rural visitors center may have things of local, regional, or even national interest, such as rare and/or antiquated artifacts or small knickknacks (e.g. coins, stamps, or sports memorabilia).

== Differences in administration of welcome centers ==
Each state varies in its administration of welcome centers. For example, in Georgia, the Georgia Department of Transportation (GDOT) constructs and maintains its 9 welcome centers, while in Tennessee, the Tennessee Department of Tourist Development constructs and maintains Tennessee's 14 welcome centers.

== Gallery ==
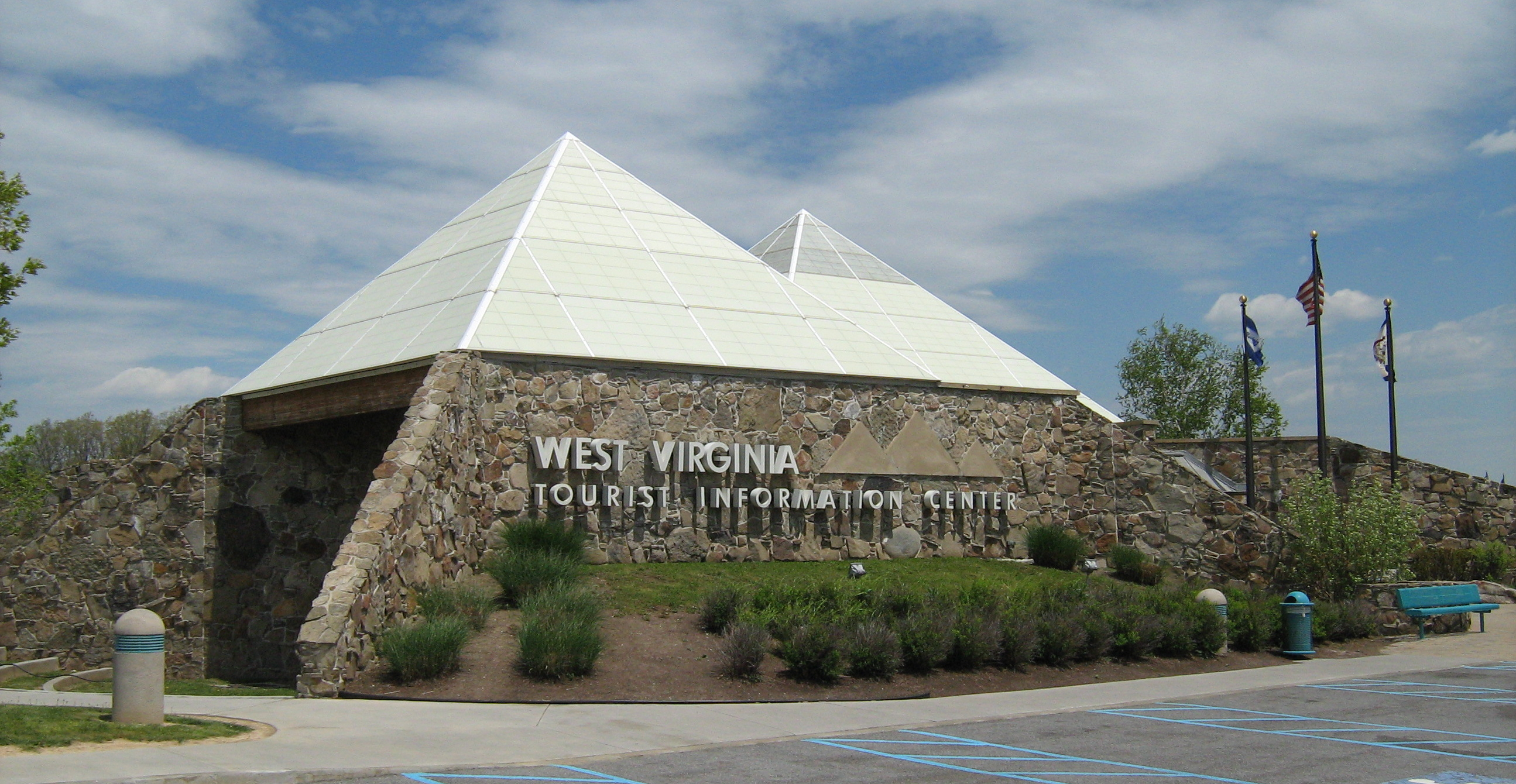
West Virginia Tourist Information Center in Princeton off the West Virginia Turnpike.

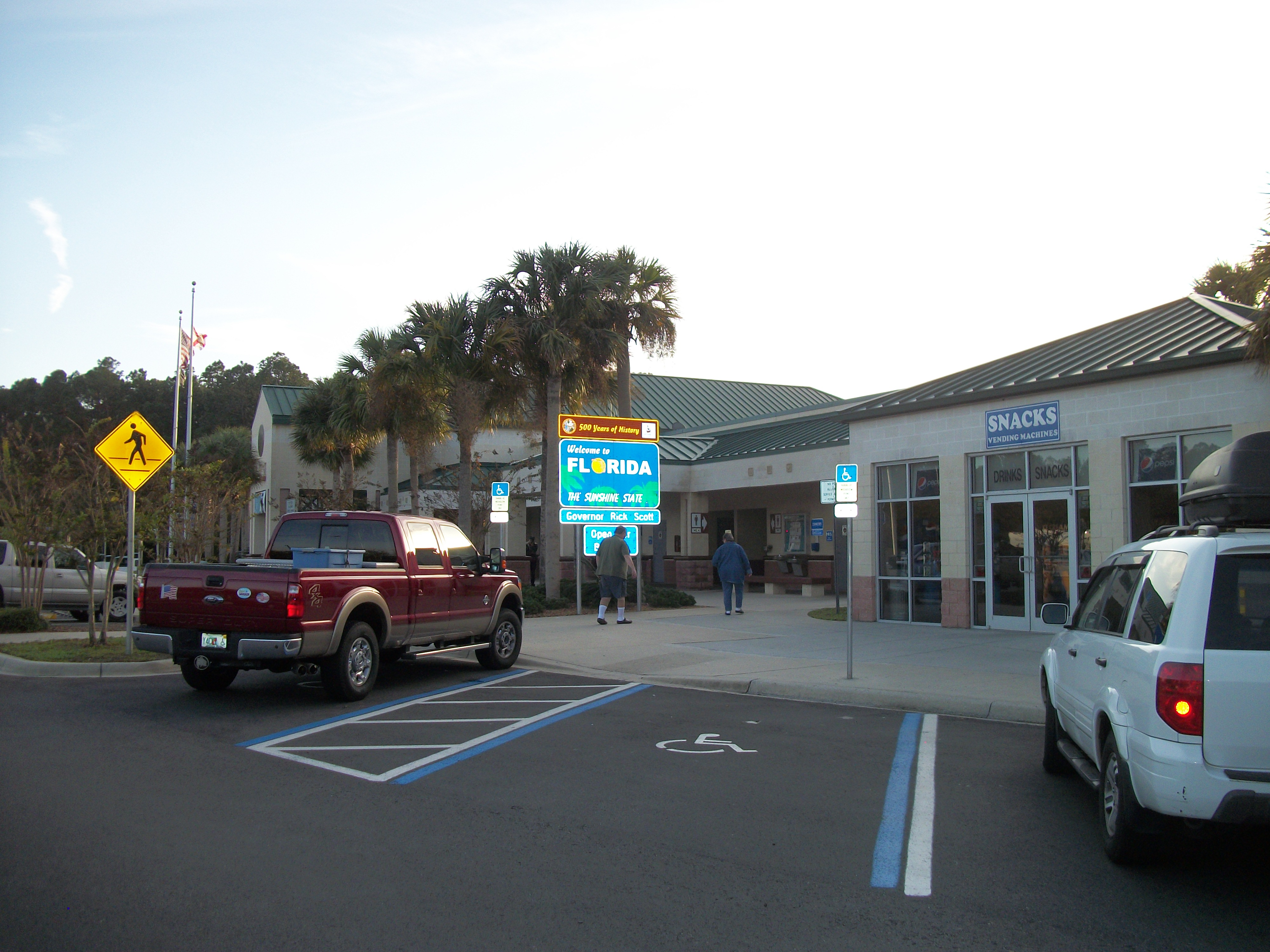
Florida welcome center off southbound I-95 north of Yulee.

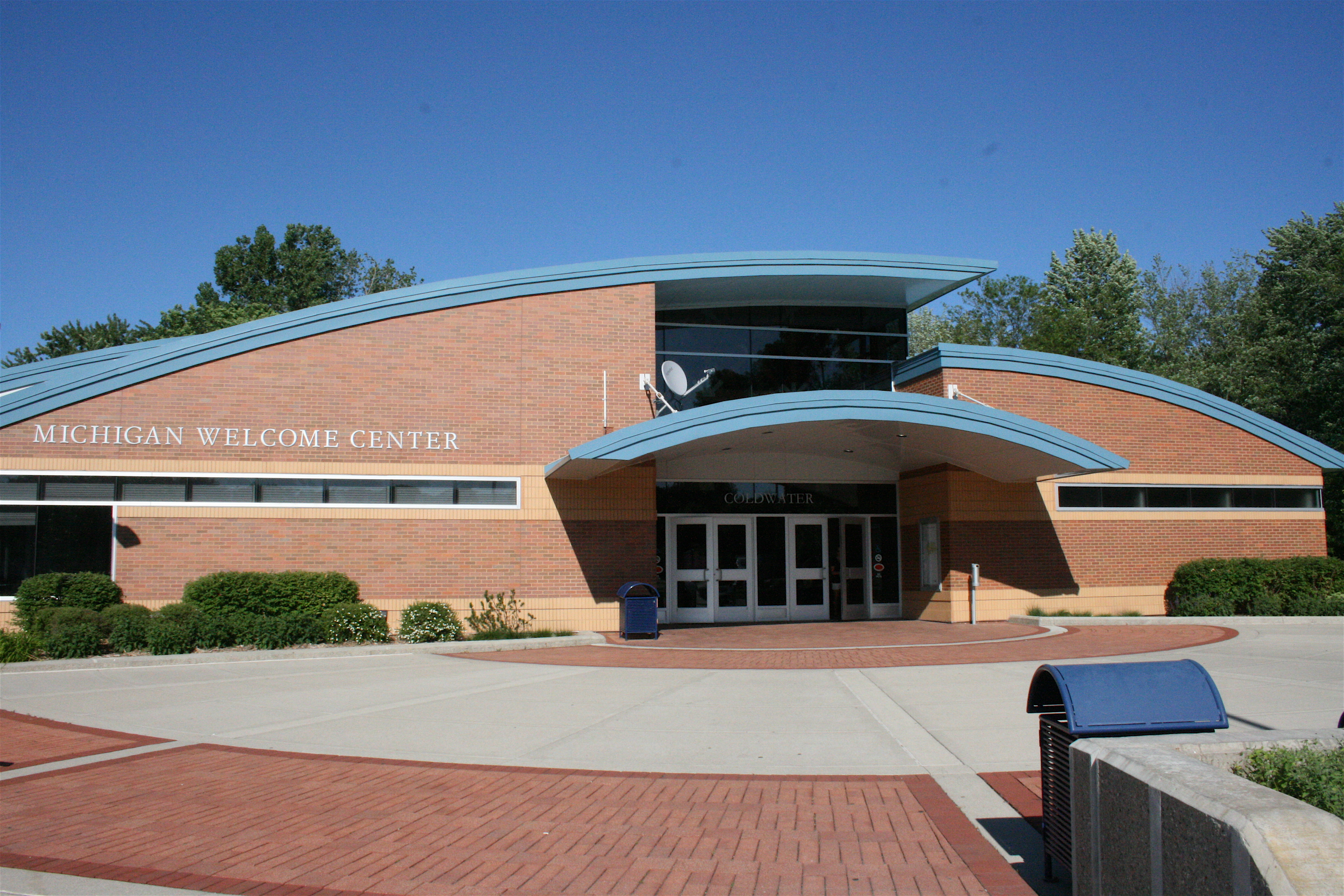
State-owned and operated welcome center in Coldwater, Michigan.

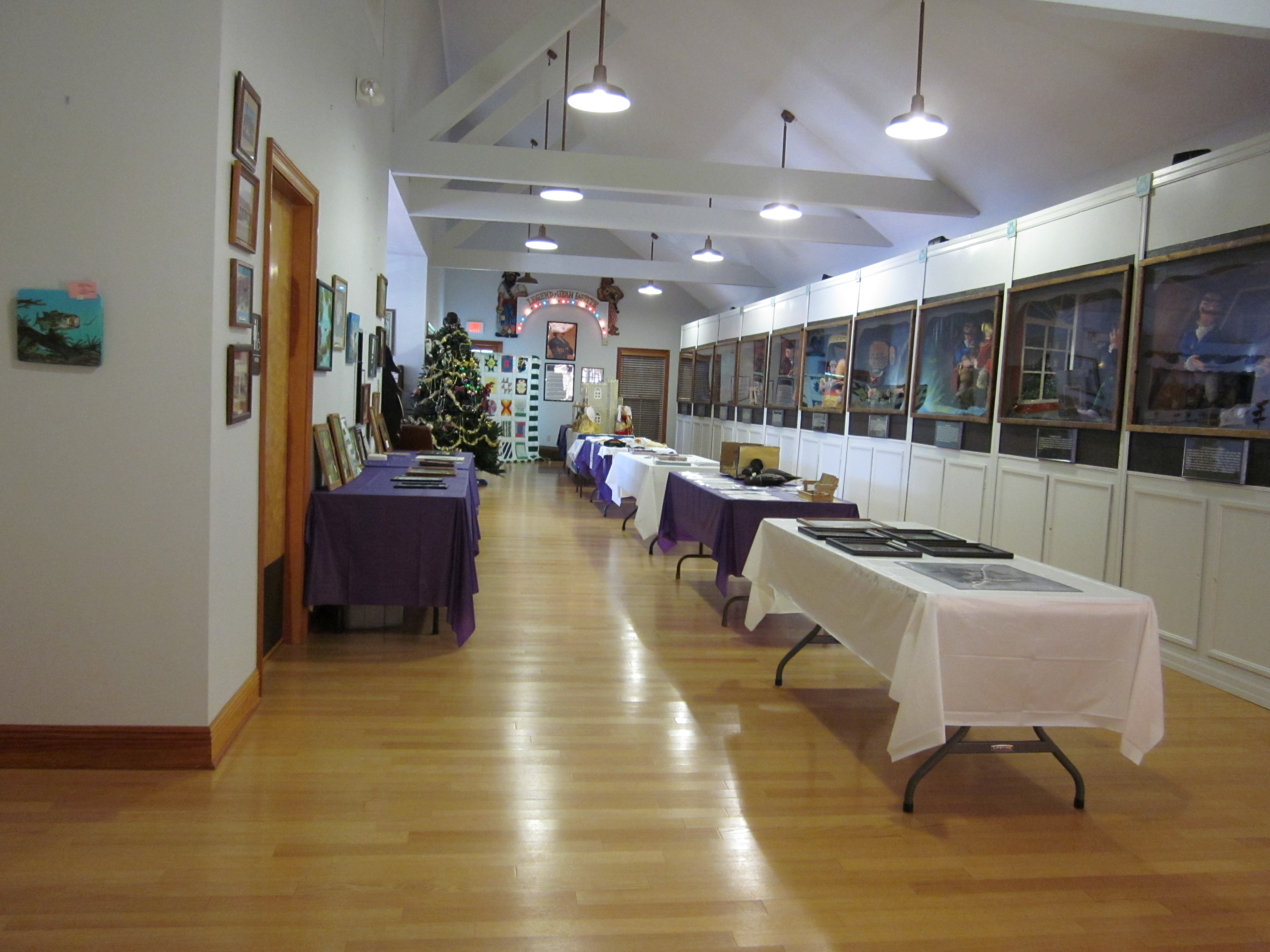
Municipally owned welcome center in Jean Lafitte, Louisiana.

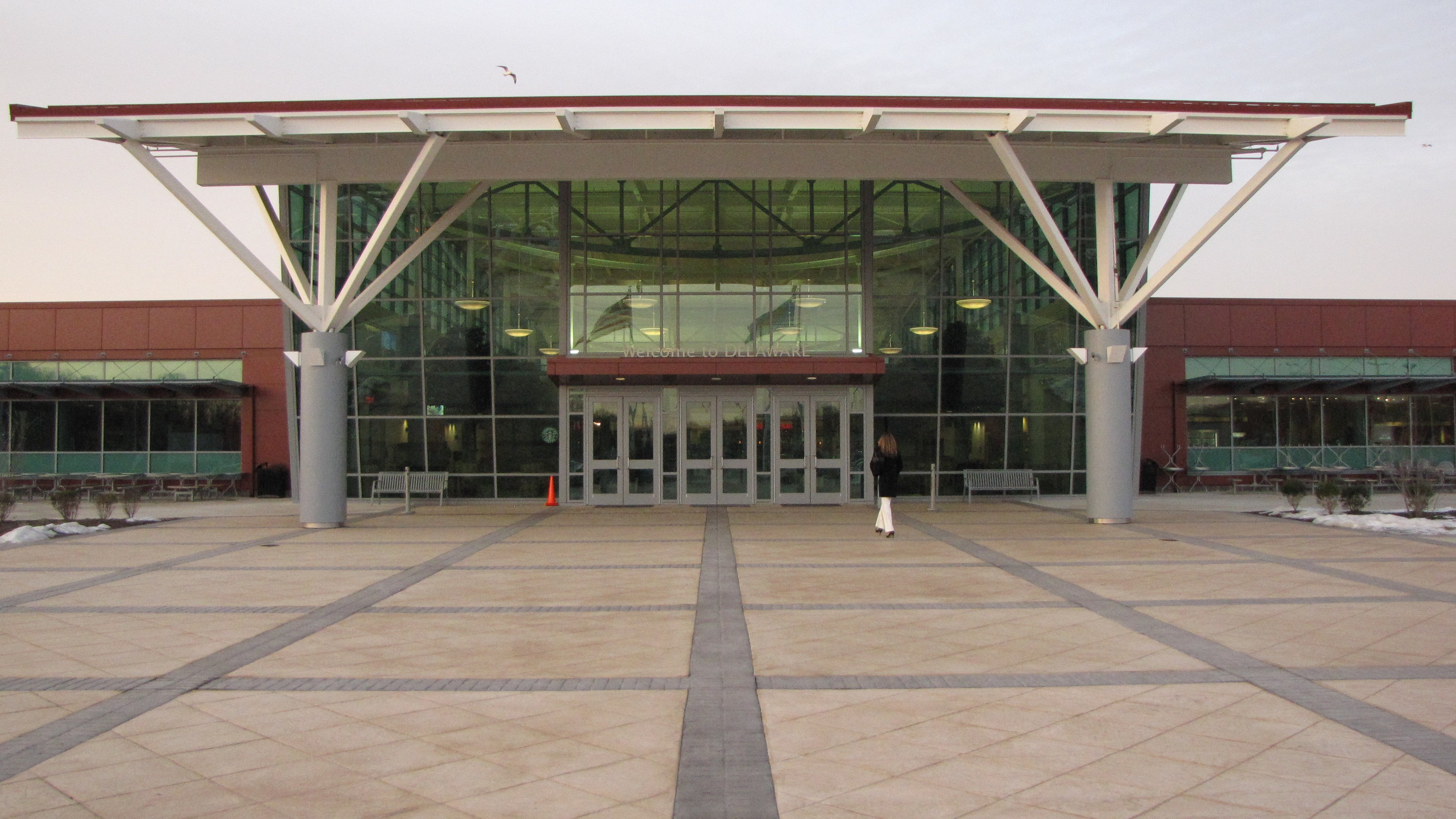
Service plaza on a toll road: Biden Welcome Center on the Delaware Turnpike (I-95) in Christiana.

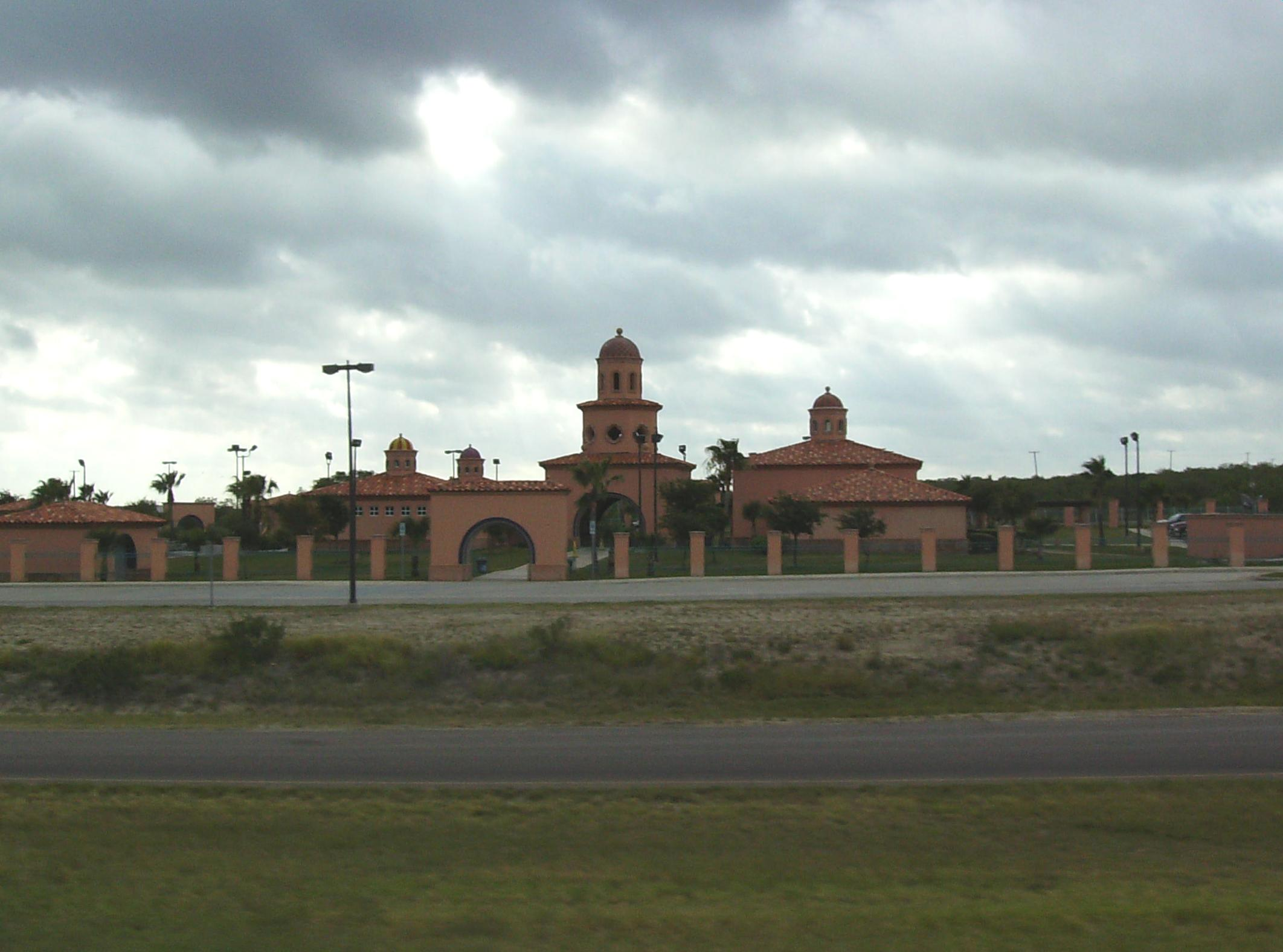
Texas Travel Information Center located near Laredo along I-35, 18 miles (29 km) from the United States-Mexico border.

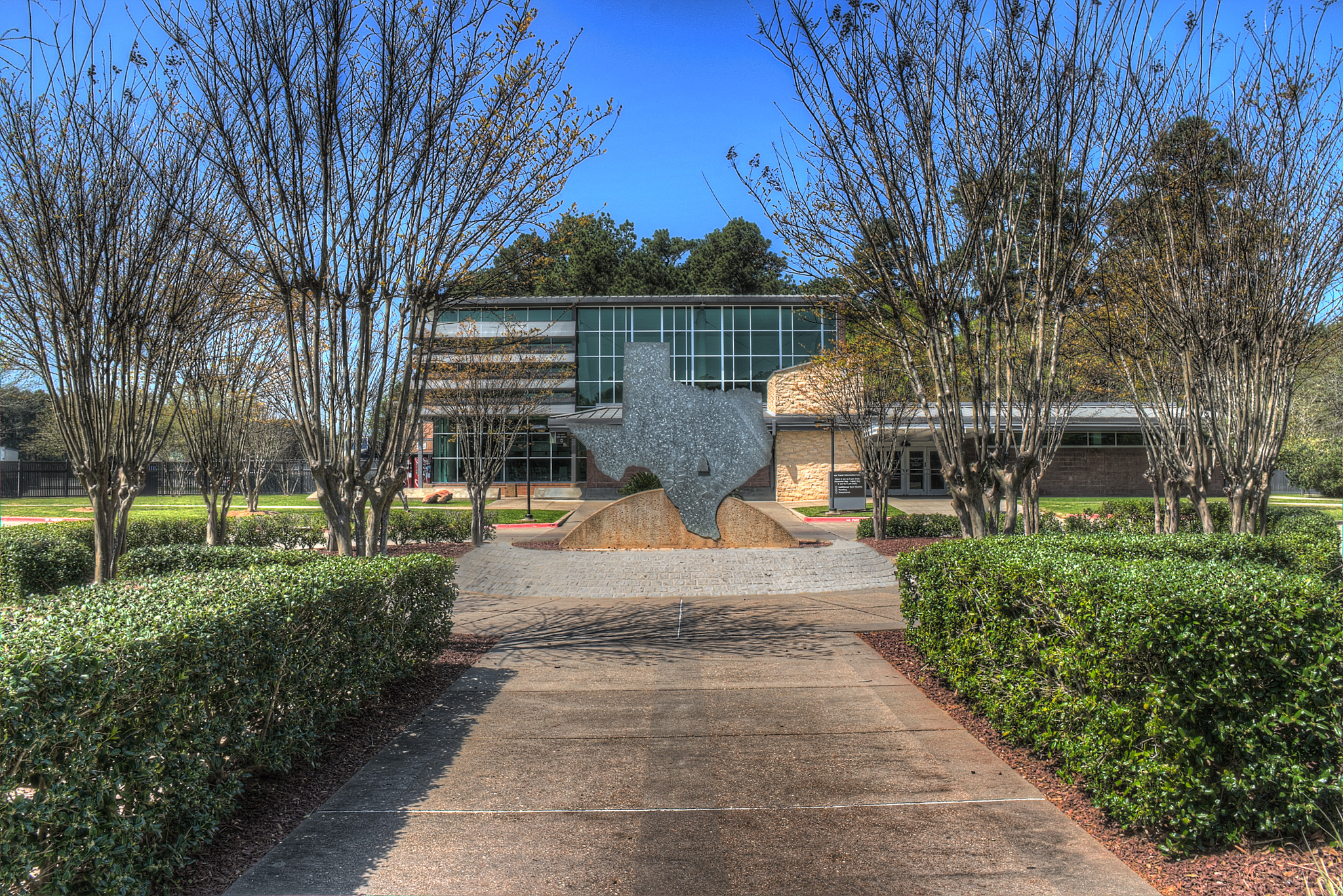
Texas information center located at I-20 exit 635 in Waskom, Texas.

== List of official state welcome centers, visitors' centers and service plazas in the United States ==
Below is a list of welcome centers, visitors' centers and service plazas, as distinct from rest areas, in the United States, derived from a combination of state tourism websites and the Interstate Rest Areas website. The list includes the state agency responsible for the welcome centers and service plazas; the interstate, U.S. Route, state highway, or local street address that the welcome center or service plaza is located at; the city, the county or other political subdivision that the welcome center or service plaza's city is located in; and explanatory footnotes.

Welcome centers in the United States (Note: Note that in this list, for purposes of simplicity, welcome center refers to service plazas, visitors' centers, and de facto welcome centers. In addition, any directional references not mentioned in a location means that the exit can be accessed in both directions. (NOTE: No representation is given of the accuracy of the exit numbers, locations, addresses, or directions of the welcome centers, service plazas, or visitors centers.))
State	Highway served	City	County or other political subdivision(s) in which the city is located	Location and notes	References
Alabama Department of Transportation	I-59	Collinsville	DeKalb County	Located at exit 241 off I-59 southbound	
Alabama Department of Transportation	I-20/I-59	Cuba	Sumter County	Located immediately after the welcome to Alabama sign on I-59/I-20 eastbound	
Alabama Department of Transportation	I-65	Elkmont	Limestone County	Located at exit 364 off I-65 southbound	
Alabama Department of Transportation	I-10	Grand Bay	Mobile County	Located immediately after the welcome to Alabama sign on I-10 eastbound	
Alabama Department of Transportation	I-20	Heflin	Cleburne County	Located at exit 213 off I-20 southbound	
Alabama Department of Transportation	I-85	Lanett	Chambers County	Located at exit 79 off I-85 southbound	
Alabama Department of Transportation	US 231	Madrid	Houston County	Located approximately 0.6 miles (0.97 km) from the Alabama–Florida border	
Alabama Department of Transportation	I-10	Seminole	Baldwin County	Located at exit 66 off I-10 westbound	
Arizona Office of Tourism	I-40	Lupton	Apache County	Located at exit 359 off I-40	
Arkansas Department of Parks and Tourism	US 71	Bentonville	Benton County		
Arkansas Department of Parks and Tourism	I-55	Blytheville	Mississippi County	Located at exit 68 off I-55 southbound	
Arkansas Department of Parks and Tourism	US 67	Corning	Clay County		
Arkansas Department of Parks and Tourism	US 63/US 82/US 167/AR 7	El Dorado	Union County		
Arkansas Department of Parks and Tourism	US 65	Harrison	Boone County		
Arkansas Department of Parks and Tourism	US 49	Helena/West Helena	Phillips County		
Arkansas Department of Parks and Tourism	US 65/US 82/US 278	Lake Village	Chicot County		
Arkansas Department of Parks and Tourism	US 63	Mammoth Spring	Fulton County	Located at exit 17 off US 63 northbound	
Arkansas Department of Parks and Tourism	US 412	Siloam Springs	Benton County		
Arkansas Department of Parks and Tourism	I-30	Texarkana	Miller County	Located at exit 7 off I-30 eastbound	
Arkansas Department of Parks and Tourism	US 59/US 71	Texarkana	Miller County		
Arkansas Department of Parks and Tourism	I-40	Van Buren	Crawford County	Located at exit 2 off I-40 eastbound	
Arkansas Department of Parks and Tourism	I-40	West Memphis	Crittenden County	Located at exit 274 off I-40 westbound	
California (Note: California's welcome centers are administered and maintained by Visit California, formerly the California Travel & Tourism Commission. Some of these welcome centers are also co-administered by local organizations.)	I-5/SR 273	Anderson	Shasta County	Located along SR 273 at the southern end of the Shasta Gateway shopping center near exit 667 off I-5	
California	I-80/SR 49	Auburn	Placer County	Located near the corner of SR 49/High Street and Lewis Street, near exit 119B off I-80	
California	I-15	Barstow	San Bernardino County	Located at the Outlets at Barstow shopping center at exit 178 off I-15	
California	I-10	Cabazon	Riverside County	Located at the Cabazon Outlets shopping center at exit 104 off I-10	
California	US 50	El Dorado Hills	El Dorado County	Located at the El Dorado Hills Town Center shopping area at exit 30 off US 50	
California	Jelly Belly Candy Company factory	Fairfield	Solano County	Located inside the Jelly Belly factory's visitor center	
California	US 101/SR 152	Gilroy	Santa Clara County	Located at the Gilroy Premium Outlets shopping center at SR 152 west/exit 357 off US 101	
California	I-5	Los Angeles area	Los Angeles County	Officially called Los Angeles, but located in the City of Commerce at the Citadel Outlets shopping center near exit 129 off I-5	
California	SR 203	Mammoth Lakes	Mono County		
California	I-5/SR 76/CR S21	Oceanside	San Diego County	Located on CR S21/Coast Hwy, near the western terminus of SR 76 at exit 54A off I-5 northbound and exit 54B southbound	
California	I-10/I-15	Ontario	San Bernardino County	Located at the Ontario Mills shopping mall near exit 57 off I-10 and exit 110 off I-15	
California	US 101	Pismo Beach	San Luis Obispo County	Located at the Pismo Beach Premium Outlets shopping center near exit 189 off US 101 northbound and exit 190A southbound	
California	SR 178	Ridgecrest	Kern County	Located on the northern side of the Ridgecrest Town Center shopping area	
California	US 101	Salinas	Monterey County	Located at the southern end of the Westridge Shopping Center near exit 330 off US 101	
California	I-5	San Clemente	Orange County	Located at the Outlets at San Clemente shopping center between exits 76 and 77 off I-5	
California	Cross Border Xpress	San Diego	San Diego County		
California	Pier 39	City and County of San Francisco			
California	Santa Rosa Downtown station	Santa Rosa	Sonoma County	Located inside the historic station building, part of the Railroad Square District	
California	SR 107	Torrance	Los Angeles County	Located inside the Del Amo Fashion Center	
California	Truckee station	Truckee	Nevada County	Located inside the station building	
California	SR 62	Yucca Valley	San Bernardino County		
Colorado Tourism Office	601 State Avenue	Alamosa	Alamosa County		
Colorado Tourism Office	I-70	Burlington	Kit Carson County	Located at exit 437 off I-70 westbound	
Colorado Tourism Office	928 E. Main Street	Cortez	Montezuma County		
Colorado Tourism Office	101 E. Stegosaurus Street	Dinosaur	Moffat County		
Colorado Tourism Office	3745 E. Prospect Road	Fort Collins	Larimer County		
Colorado Tourism Office	I-70/SH 340	Fruita	Mesa County	Located at exit 19 off I-70	
Colorado Tourism Office	20934 County Road 28	Julesburg	Sedgwick County		
Colorado Tourism Office	109 E. Beech Street	Lamar	Prowers County		
Colorado Tourism Office	17900 Trading Post	Morrison	Jefferson County		
Colorado Tourism Office	246 Rainbow Drive	Silverthorne	Summit County		
Colorado Tourism Office	309 Nevada Avenue	Trinidad	Las Animas County		
Connecticut Department of Economic and Community Development, Office of Culture and Tourism (Note: Connecticut abolished county governments in 1960, so all counties in Connecticut are given only as geographical references.)	I-84	Danbury	Fairfield County	Located at exit 2 off I-84 eastbound	
Connecticut Department of Economic and Community Development, Office of Culture and Tourism	I-95	Darien	Fairfield County	Located between exits 11 and 12 off I-95 northbound	
Connecticut Department of Economic and Community Development, Office of Culture and Tourism	I-95	North Stonington	New London County	Located between exits 92 and 91 off I-95 southbound	
Connecticut Department of Economic and Community Development, Office of Culture and Tourism	I-84	West Willington	Tolland County	Located between exits 70 and 69 off I-84 westbound	
Delaware Tourism Office	I-95	Christiana	New Castle County	Called Biden Welcome Center, located between exits 1 and 3 in the median off I-95	
Florida Commission on Tourism/Official Florida Tourism Industry Marketing Corporation (VISITFLORIDA)	US 231	Campbellton	Jackson County		
Florida Commission on Tourism/Official Florida Tourism Industry Marketing Corporation (VISITFLORIDA)	I-75	Jennings	Hamilton County	Located at exit 470 off I-75 southbound	
Florida Commission on Tourism/Official Florida Tourism Industry Marketing Corporation (VISITFLORIDA)	Florida Turnpike (Homestead Extension)	Kendall	Miami-Dade County	Located north of exits 17 and 19 off the HEFT; named Snapper Creek Service Plaza	
Florida Commission on Tourism/Official Florida Tourism Industry Marketing Corporation (VISITFLORIDA)	Florida Turnpike	Okeechobee	Okeechobee County	Named Fort Drum Service Plaza	
Florida Commission on Tourism/Official Florida Tourism Industry Marketing Corporation (VISITFLORIDA)	Florida Turnpike	Orlando	Orange County	Named Turkey Lake Service Plaza	
Florida Commission on Tourism/Official Florida Tourism Industry Marketing Corporation (VISITFLORIDA)	I-10	Pensacola	Escambia County	Located at exit 4 off I-10 eastbound	
Florida Commission on Tourism/Official Florida Tourism Industry Marketing Corporation (VISITFLORIDA)	Florida Turnpike	Pompano Beach	Broward County		
Florida Commission on Tourism/Official Florida Tourism Industry Marketing Corporation (VISITFLORIDA)	Florida Turnpike	Port St. Lucie	St. Lucie County	Named Port St. Lucie-Fort Pierce Service Plaza	
Florida Commission on Tourism/Official Florida Tourism Industry Marketing Corporation (VISITFLORIDA)	Florida Turnpike	Saint Cloud	Osceola County	Named Canoe Creek Service Plaza	
Florida Commission on Tourism/Official Florida Tourism Industry Marketing Corporation (VISITFLORIDA)	Florida Turnpike	Wellington–Greenacres line	Palm Beach County	Named West Palm Beach Service Plaza	
Florida Commission on Tourism/Official Florida Tourism Industry Marketing Corporation (VISITFLORIDA)	Florida Turnpike	Wildwood	Sumter County	Named Okahumpka Service Plaza	
Florida Commission on Tourism/Official Florida Tourism Industry Marketing Corporation (VISITFLORIDA)	I-95	Yulee	Nassau County	Located at exit 378 off I-95 southbound	
Georgia Department of Transportation	I-20	Augusta	Richmond County	Located 1 mile (1.6 km) from the South Carolina–Georgia border off I-20 westbound	
Georgia Department of Transportation	1751 Williams Road	Columbus	Muscogee County	Located off the northwest corner of exit 12 off I-185	
Georgia Department of Transportation	I-95	Garden City	Chatham County	Located immediately after the welcome to Georgia sign and a southbound truck weigh station and shares the ramp back to I-95 southbound	
Georgia Department of Transportation	I-95	Kingsland	Camden County	Located at exit 1 off I-95 northbound	
Georgia Department of Transportation	8463 Burton's Ferry Highway	Sylvania	Screven County	First Welcome Center in Georgia located less than one mile from South Carolina border; listed on the National Register of Historic Places	
Georgia Department of Transportation	I-75	Lake Park	Lowndes County	Located between exits 2 and 5 off I-75 northbound	
Georgia Department of Transportation	I-85	Lavonia	Franklin County	Located south of exit 177 off I-85 southbound	
Georgia Department of Transportation	I-75	Ringgold	Catoosa County	Located at exit 352 off I-75 southbound	
Georgia Department of Transportation	I-20	Tallapoosa	Haralson County	Located 1 mile (1.6 km) from the Georgia–Alabama border off I-20 eastbound	
Georgia Department of Transportation	I-85	West Point	Harris County	Located approximately 0.5 miles (0.80 km) from the Georgia–Alabama border	
Idaho Department of Commerce	I-90	Coeur d'Alene	Kootenai County	Located at exit 28 off I-90	
Idaho Department of Commerce	I-84	Fruitland	Payette County	Located at exit 1 off I-84 eastbound	
Idaho Department of Commerce	30 North 100 West	Malad City	Oneida County		
Idaho Department of Commerce	I-90	Post Falls	Kootenai County	Located at exit 8 off I-90 eastbound	
Illinois Department of Transportation	I-57	Anna	Union County	Located at exit 32 on I-57	
Illinois Department of Transportation	I-57	Benton	Franklin County	Located at exit 79 off I-57	
Illinois Department of Transportation	I-55	Edwardsville	Madison County	Located at exit 27 off I-55 northbound	
Illinois Department of Transportation	I-70	Highland	Madison County	Located at exit 27 off I-70 eastbound	
Illinois Department of Transportation	I-64	Mascoutah	St. Clair County	Located at exit 25 off I-64 eastbound	
Illinois Department of Transportation	I-24	Metropolis	Massac County	Located at exit 1 off I-24	
Illinois Department of Transportation	I-74	Oakwood	Vermilion County	Located at exit 208 off I-74 westbound	
Illinois Department of Transportation	I-80	Port Byron	Rock Island County	Located at exit 1 off I-80 eastbound	
Illinois Department of Transportation	I-90/I-39	South Beloit	Winnebago County	Located at exit 2 off I-90 southbound and exit 2 off I-39 eastbound	
Illinois Department of Transportation	I-70	Wabash	Clark County	Located at exit 149 off I-70	
Indiana Department of Transportation	I-74	Covington	Fountain County	Located at milepost 1 off I-74 eastbound	
Indiana Department of Transportation	I-64	Griffin	Posey County	Located at milepost 7 off I-64 eastbound	
Indiana Department of Transportation	I-80/I-94	Hammond	Lake County	Located at exit 3 off I-80/I-94	
Indiana Department of Transportation	I-65	Henryville	Clark County	Located at milepost 22 off I-65 northbound	
Indiana Department of Transportation	I-94	Michigan City	LaPorte County	Located at milepost 43 off I-94 westbound	
Indiana Department of Transportation	I-70	Richmond	Wayne County	Located at milepost 143 off I-70 westbound	
Indiana Department of Transportation	I-70	West Terre Haute	Vigo County	Located at milepost 1 off I-70 eastbound	
Iowa Economic Development Authority	243 W. Broadway	Arnolds Park	Dickinson County		
Iowa Economic Development Authority	301 N. Washington	Bloomfield	Davis County		
Iowa Economic Development Authority	400 Front Street	Burlington	Des Moines County		
Iowa Economic Development Authority	3434 Richard Downing Avenue	Council Bluffs	Pottawattamie County		
Iowa Economic Development Authority	1896 Railroad	Dows	Franklin County/Wright County		
Iowa Economic Development Authority	300 Main Street, Suite 100	Dubuque	Dubuque County		
Iowa Economic Development Authority	29862 Osborne Road	Elkader	Clayton County		
Iowa Economic Development Authority	4038 Main Street	Elk Horn	Shelby County		
Iowa Economic Development Authority	1121 Broadway	Emmetsburg	Palo Alto County		
Iowa Economic Development Authority	109 S. Spruce Drive	Lamoni	Decatur County		
Iowa Economic Development Authority	2931 Monroe Avenue	Missouri Valley	Harrison County		
Iowa Economic Development Authority	10 Amherst Boulevard	Nashua	Chickasaw County/Floyd County		
Iowa Economic Development Authority	I-35	Northwood	Worth County	Located at exit 214 off I-35	
Iowa Economic Development Authority	2804 Crossroads Drive	Percival	Fremont County		
Iowa Economic Development Authority	I-29	Sergeant Bluff	Woodbury County	Located at exit 139 off I-29 southbound	
Iowa Economic Development Authority	1000 Larson Park Road	Sioux City	Plymouth County/Woodbury County		
Iowa Economic Development Authority	I-80	Underwood	Pottawattamie County	Located at exit 19 off I-80 westbound	
Iowa Economic Development Authority	I-80	Wilton	Cedar County/Muscatine County	Located at exit 270 off I-80 westbound	
Kansas Department of Wildlife, Parks, and Tourism, Tourism Division	I-70	Goodland	Sherman County	Located at exit 7 off I-70 eastbound	
Kentucky Department of Travel	957 Walnut Meadow Road	Berea	Madison County		
Kentucky Department of Travel	I-65	Franklin	Simpson County	Located at exit 1 off I-65 northbound	
Kentucky Department of Travel	I-64	Grayson	Carter County	Located at exit 173 off I-64 westbound	
Kentucky Department of Travel	I-24	Hopkinsville	Christian County	Located at exit 92 off I-24 westbound	
Kentucky Department of Travel	I-24	Paducah	McCracken County	Located at exit 7 off I-24 westbound	
Kentucky Department of Travel	I-64	Shelbyville	Shelby County	Located at exit 28 off I-64 eastbound	
Kentucky Department of Travel	I-65	Shepherdsville	Bullitt County	Located at exit 114 off I-65 southbound	
Kentucky Department of Travel	I-75	Williamsburg	Whitley County	Located at exit 1 off I-75 northbound	
Louisiana Department of Culture, Recreation, and Tourism	702 N. River Road	Baton Rouge	East Baton Rouge Parish		
Louisiana Department of Culture, Recreation, and Tourism	900 N. Third Street	Baton Rouge	East Baton Rouge Parish		
Louisiana Department of Culture, Recreation, and Tourism	7050 Highway 1 North	Boyce	Rapides Parish		
Louisiana Department of Culture, Recreation, and Tourism	1908 Atchafalaya River Highway	Breaux Bridge	St. Martin Parish		
Louisiana Department of Culture, Recreation, and Tourism	I-20	Greenwood	Caddo Parish	Located at exit 2 off I-20 eastbound	
Louisiana Department of Culture, Recreation, and Tourism	I-55	Kentwood	Tangipahoa Parish	Located at exit 65 off I-55 southbound	
Louisiana Department of Culture, Recreation, and Tourism	106 Tauzin Island Road	Natchitoches	Natchitoches Parish		
Louisiana Department of Culture, Recreation, and Tourism	529 St. Ann Street	New Orleans	Orleans Parish		
Louisiana Department of Culture, Recreation, and Tourism	8904 Highway 165	Oberlin	Allen Parish		
Louisiana Department of Culture, Recreation, and Tourism	I-59	Pearl River	St. Tammany Parish	Located at exit 1 off I-59 southbound	
Louisiana Department of Culture, Recreation, and Tourism	700 Clyde Fant Parkway	Shreveport	Caddo Parish		
Louisiana Department of Culture, Recreation, and Tourism	I-10	Slidell	St. Tammany Parish	Located at exit 270 off I-10 westbound	
Louisiana Department of Culture, Recreation, and Tourism	US 165/LA 10	St. Francisville	West Feliciana Parish		
Louisiana Department of Culture, Recreation, and Tourism	I-20	Tallulah	Madison Parish	Located at exit 184 off I-20 westbound	
Louisiana Department of Culture, Recreation, and Tourism	112 Front Street	Vidalia	Concordia Parish		
Louisiana Department of Culture, Recreation, and Tourism	I-10	Vinton	Calcasieu Parish	Located at exit 1 off I-10 eastbound	
Maine Tourism Association	39 Union Street, Suite B	Calais	Washington County		
Maine Tourism Association	97 Main Street	Fryeburg	Oxford County		
Maine Tourism Association	I-95	Hampden	Penobscot County	Located at exit 175 off I-95 northbound and exit 179 off I-95 southbound	
Maine Tourism Association	I-95	Houlton	Aroostook County	Located at exit 302 off I-95 westbound	
Maine Tourism Association	I-95	Kittery	York County	Located at exit 3 off I-95 northbound	
Maine Tourism Association	I-95	West Gardiner	Kennebec County	Located at exit 102 off I-95 northbound and exit 103 off I-95 southbound	
Maine Tourism Association	I-295	West Gardiner	Kennebec County	Located at exit 51 off I-295	
Maine Tourism Association	I-295	Yarmouth	Cumberland County	Located at exit 17 off I-295 eastbound	
Maryland Office of Tourism Development	I-95	Aberdeen	Harford County	Called Maryland House, located at exit 82 off I-95	
Maryland Office of Tourism Development	US 15	Emmitsburg	Frederick County		
Maryland Office of Tourism Development	I-68	Friendsville	Garrett County		
Maryland Office of Tourism Development	I-70	Myersville	Frederick County	Located at exit 39 off I-70	
Maryland Office of Tourism Development	US 301	Newburg	Charles County	Called Crain Memorial Travel Information Center	
Maryland Office of Tourism Development	I-95	North East	Cecil County	Called Chesapeake House, located at exit 97 off I-95	
Maryland Office of Tourism Development	US 13	Pocomoke City	Worcester County		
Maryland Office of Tourism Development	I-95	Savage	Howard County	Located at exit 35 off I-95 northbound and exit 38 off I-95 southbound	
Massachusetts Department of Transportation (Note: Massachusetts abolished some counties' governments per legislative action in 1997, but some other counties, such as Dukes County and Bristol County, have retained their governmental structures. In this list, all counties in Massachusetts are given only as geographical references.)	US 6	Barnstable	Barnstable County	Located between exits 68 and 72 on US 6 eastbound; open seasonally	
Massachusetts Department of Transportation	Massachusetts Turnpike	Charlton	Worcester County	Located between exits 78 and 90 on I-90 eastbound at service plaza	
Massachusetts Department of Transportation	I-91	Greenfield	Franklin County	Located at exit 43 off I-91	
Massachusetts Department of Transportation	Route 2	Lancaster	Worcester County	Located between exits 103 and 102 on Route 2 westbound	
Massachusetts Department of Transportation	Massachusetts Turnpike	Lee	Berkshire County	Located between exits 3 and 10 on I-90 eastbound at service plaza	
Massachusetts Department of Transportation	I-95	Mansfield	Bristol County	Located between exits 7 and 12 on I-95 northbound	
Massachusetts Department of Transportation	I-95	Salisbury	Essex County	Located at exit 90 on I-95 southbound	
Massachusetts Department of Transportation	Route 25	Plymouth	Plymouth County	Located between exits 3 and 10 on Route 25 eastbound; open seasonally	
Massachusetts Department of Transportation	I-195	Swansea	Bristol County	Located between exits 5 and 8 on I-195 eastbound	
Massachusetts Department of Transportation	I-195	Wareham	Plymouth County	Located between exits 35 and 39 on I-195 eastbound	
Michigan Department of Transportation	US 127	Clare	Clare County	Located near exit 160 off US 127	
Michigan Department of Transportation	I-69	Coldwater	Branch County	Located near exit 6 off I-69 northbound	
Michigan Department of Transportation	Ambassador Bridge/I-75	Detroit	Wayne County	Located near the foot of the Ambassador Bridge; accessible from exit 47C off I-75	
Michigan Department of Transportation	US 23	Dundee	Monroe County	Located near exit 7 off US 23 northbound	
Michigan Department of Transportation	US 2	Ironwood	Gogebic County		
Michigan Department of Transportation	US 2	Iron Mountain	Dickinson County		
Michigan Department of Transportation	I-75	Mackinaw City	Emmet County	Located at exit 338 off I-75	
Michigan Department of Transportation	US 41	Marquette	Marquette County		
Michigan Department of Transportation	US 41	Menominee	Menominee County		
Michigan Department of Transportation	I-75	Monroe	Monroe County	Located at exit 10 off I-75 northbound	
Michigan Department of Transportation	I-94	New Buffalo	Berrien County	Located immediately after the welcome to Michigan sign on I-94 eastbound and is the first welcome center in the United States, opening on May 4, 1935	
Michigan Department of Transportation	I-69/I-94	Port Huron	St. Clair County	Temporary welcome center for Port Huron and is located at exit 174 off I-69 westbound; the permanent welcome center is located at exit 274 at the junction off I-69 and I-94	
Michigan Department of Transportation	I-75	St. Ignace	Mackinac County	Located north of the Mackinac Bridge	
Michigan Department of Transportation	I-75	Sault Ste. Marie	Chippewa County	Located near exit 394 off I-75 northbound	
Minnesota Tourism Council	I-35	Albert Lea	Freeborn County	Located at exit 1 off I-35 northbound	
Minnesota Tourism Council	I-90	Beaver Creek	Rock County	Located immediately after the welcome to Minnesota sign on I-90 eastbound	
Minnesota Tourism Council	60 East Broadway	Bloomington	Hennepin County	Located in the Mall of America	
Minnesota Tourism Council	I-90/US 61	Dresbach	Winona County	Located at exit 276 off I-90 westbound	
Minnesota Tourism Council	I-35	Duluth	St. Louis County	Located at exit 249 off I-35	
Minnesota Tourism Council	US 2	East Grand Forks	Polk County	Located 10 miles (16 km) east of the Minnesota–North Dakota border (open May–October only)	
Minnesota Tourism Council	MN 61	Grand Portage	Cook County	Open year-round	
Minnesota Tourism Council	I-94	Lakeland	Washington County	Located at exit 256 off I-94 westbound	
Minnesota Tourism Council	I-94	Moorhead	Clay County	Located at exit 2 off I-94 eastbound	
Minnesota Tourism Council	US 10	St. Cloud	Sherburne County	Located 1 mile (1.6 km) southeast of St. Cloud	
Minnesota Tourism Council	100 Metro Square, 121 7th Place East	St. Paul	Ramsey County		
Minnesota Tourism Council	US 59/MN 60	Worthington	Nobles County	Located 5 miles (8.0 km) north of the Minnesota–Iowa border (open May–October only)	
Mississippi Development Authority, Tourism Division	2028 South Tate Street	Corinth	Alcorn County		
Mississippi Development Authority, Tourism Division	Intersection of US 82 and Reed Road	Greenville	Washington County		
Mississippi Development Authority, Tourism Division	I-55	Hernando	DeSoto County	Located at exit 279 off I-55 southbound	
Mississippi Development Authority, Tourism Division	US 49/US 61	Lula	Coahoma County		
Mississippi Development Authority, Tourism Division	I-55	Magnolia	Pike County	Located at exit 3 off I-55 northbound	
Mississippi Development Authority, Tourism Division	I-10	Moss Point	Jackson County	Located at exit 75 off I-10 westbound	
Mississippi Development Authority, Tourism Division	640 South Canal Street, Box D	Natchez	Adams County		
Mississippi Development Authority, Tourism Division	I-59	North Picayune	Pearl River County	Located at exit 3 off I-59 northbound	
Mississippi Development Authority, Tourism Division	I-10/MS 607	Pearlington	Hancock County	Located at exit 2 off I-10 eastbound	
Mississippi Development Authority, Tourism Division	I-22/US 78	Tremont	Itawamba County		
Mississippi Development Authority, Tourism Division	I-20/I-59	Toomsuba	Lauderdale County	Located at exit 164 off I-20/I-59	
Mississippi Development Authority, Tourism Division	4210 South Washington Street	Vicksburg	Warren County		
Mississippi Development Authority, Tourism Division	853 U.S. Highway 61 South	Woodville	Wilkinson County		
Missouri Department of Transportation	I-270	Chain of Rocks	Lincoln County	Located at exit 34	
Missouri Department of Transportation	I-44	Conway	Laclede County	Located at exit 110 off I-44	
Missouri Department of Transportation	I-35	Eagleville	Harrison County	Located at exit 112 off I-35 southbound	
Missouri Department of Transportation	I-44	Joplin	Jasper County/Newton County	Located at exit 2 off I-44 eastbound	
Missouri Department of Transportation	I-55	Marston	New Madrid County	Located at exit 41 off I-55 southbound	
Missouri Department of Transportation	I-29	Rock Port	Atchison County	Located at exit 108 off I-29 southbound	
Montana Department of Transportation	US 212	Broadus	Powder River County	Located at exit 81 off US 212 southbound	
Montana Department of Transportation	US 2	Culbertson	Roosevelt County	Located at exit 645 off US 2 westbound	
Montana Department of Transportation	I-90	Hardin	Big Horn County	Located at exit 476 off I-90	
Montana Department of Transportation	I-15	Lima	Beaverhead County	Located at exit 15 off I-15 northbound	
Montana Department of Transportation	US 12	Lolo Pass	Missoula County	Located immediately after the welcome to Montana sign on US 12 northbound	
Montana Department of Transportation	I-90	Lookout Pass (Idaho–Montana)	Mineral County	Located at exit 4 off I-90	
Montana Department of Transportation	I-15	Sweetgrass	Toole County	Located at exit 398 off I-15 southbound	
Montana Department of Transportation	US 2	Troy	Lincoln County	Located at exit 17 off US 2 eastbound	
Montana Department of Transportation	US 287	West Yellowstone	Gallatin County	Located immediately before the welcome to Wyoming sign on US 287 southbound	
Montana Department of Transportation	I-94	Wibaux	Wibaux County	Located at exit 242 off I-94 eastbound	
Nebraska Department of Economic Development, Tourism Division	I-80	Brady	Lincoln County	Located at exit 199 off I-80 westbound	
Nebraska Department of Economic Development, Tourism Division	I-80	Cozad	Dawson County	Located at exit 231 off I-80 westbound and exit 222 off I-80 eastbound	
Nebraska Department of Economic Development, Tourism Division	I-80	Gretna	Sarpy County	Located at exit 432 off I-80 westbound	
Nebraska Department of Economic Development, Tourism Division	I-80	Kearney	Buffalo County	Located at exit 263 off I-80 eastbound	
Nebraska Department of Economic Development, Tourism Division	I-80	Ogallala	Keith County	Located at exit 132 off I-80 westbound and exit 124 off I-80 eastbound	
Nebraska Department of Economic Development, Tourism Division	I-80	Omaha	Douglas County	1212 Bob Gibson Boulevard; exit 454 off I-80	
Nebraska Department of Economic Development, Tourism Division	I-80	Sutherland	Lincoln County	Located at exit 159 off I-80 westbound and exit 159 off I-80 eastbound	
Nebraska Department of Economic Development, Tourism Division	I-80	York	York County	Located at exit 353 off I-80 westbound and exit 348 off I-80 eastbound	
Nevada (Note: The Las Vegas Convention and Visitors Authority and the West Wendover, Nevada, Community Development Department's Tourism and Convention Bureau administer Nevada's welcome centers.)	100 Nevada Highway	Boulder City	Clark County	Located off US 93	
Nevada	I-15	Mesquite	Clark County	Located at exit 122 off I-15	
Nevada	32100 S. Las Vegas Boulevard, Suite 112	Primm	Clark County		
Nevada	735 Wendover Boulevard	West Wendover	Elko County	Located at exit 410 off I-80	
New Hampshire Department of Business and Economic Affairs	I-89	Lebanon	Grafton County	Located at exit 57 off I-89 southbound	
New Hampshire Department of Business and Economic Affairs	I-93	Littleton	Grafton County	Located at exit 44 off I-93 northbound	
New Hampshire Department of Business and Economic Affairs	I-93	Salem	Rockingham County	Located at exit 1 off I-93 northbound	
New Hampshire Department of Business and Economic Affairs	I-95	Seabrook	Rockingham County	Located immediately after the welcome to New Hampshire sign off I-95 northbound	
New Jersey Department of State, Division of Travel and Tourism	Garden State Parkway	Wall Township	Monmouth County	Monmouth Travel Plaza, located at milepost 100	
New Jersey Department of State, Division of Travel and Tourism	360 Grove Street	Bridgewater	Somerset County	Somerset Tourist Welcome Center	
New Jersey Department of State, Division of Travel and Tourism	I-80	Columbia	Warren County	Located at milepost 7 eastbound	
New Jersey Department of State, Division of Travel and Tourism	New Jersey Turnpike	Cranbury	Middlesex County	Molly Pitcher Travel Plaza, located at milepost 72 southbound	
New Jersey Department of State, Division of Travel and Tourism	I-295	Deepwater	Salem County	Located at exit 2B northbound	
New Jersey Department of State, Division of Travel and Tourism	Jersey Gardens	Elizabeth	Union County		
New Jersey Department of State, Division of Travel and Tourism	Liberty Village Premium Outlets	Flemington	Hunterdon County		
New Jersey Department of State, Division of Travel and Tourism	Jackson Premium Outlets	Jackson	Ocean County		
New Jersey Department of State, Division of Travel and Tourism	Liberty Science Center	Jersey City	Hudson County	Near exit 14B off the New Jersey Turnpike Newark Bay Extension	
New Jersey Department of State, Division of Travel and Tourism	Garden State Parkway	Montvale	Bergen County	Montvale Travel Plaza, located at milepost 172	
New Jersey Department of State, Division of Travel and Tourism	Newark Liberty International Airport	Newark	Essex County	Located in the arrivals area of each terminal at EWR	
New Jersey Department of State, Division of Travel and Tourism	Garden State Parkway	Ocean View	Cape May County	Located at milepost 18	
New Jersey Department of State, Division of Travel and Tourism	Atlantic City Expressway	Pleasantville	Atlantic County	Located at milepost 3.5	
New Jersey Department of State, Division of Travel and Tourism	Rutgers University	Piscataway	Middlesex County		
New Jersey Department of State, Division of Travel and Tourism	New Jersey Turnpike	Ridgefield	Bergen County	Vince Lombardi Travel Plaza, located at milepost 116	
New Jersey Department of State, Division of Travel and Tourism	Jersey Shore Premium Outlets	Tinton Falls	Monmouth County		
New Jersey Department of State, Division of Travel and Tourism	Trenton Transit Center	Trenton	Mercer County		
New Mexico Tourism Department	I-10	Anthony	Doña Ana County	Located at exit 20 off I-10 westbound	
New Mexico Tourism Department	I-40	Bard	Quay County	Located at exit 373 off I-40 westbound	
New Mexico Tourism Department	I-40	Gallup	McKinley County	Located at exit 3 off I-40 eastbound	
New Mexico Tourism Department	I-10	Lordsburg	Hidalgo County	Located at exit 20A off I-10 eastbound	
New Mexico Tourism Department	100 Clayton Road	Raton	Colfax County		
New York Department of Economic Development	I-90	Amsterdam	Montgomery County	Located at milepost 168 off I-90 westbound and milepost 172 eastbound	
New York Department of Economic Development	I-90	Angola	Erie County	Located at milepost 447 off I-90	
New York Department of Economic Development	I-87	Ardsley	Westchester County	Located at milepost 6 off I-87 northbound	
New York Department of Economic Development	I-90	Batavia	Genesee County	Located at milepost 397 off I-90 eastbound	
New York Department of Economic Development	I-87	Beekmantown	Clinton County		
New York Department of Economic Development	I-86	Bemus Point	Chautauqua County	Located at exit 22 off I-86 eastbound	
New York Department of Economic Development	I-90	Canastota	Madison County	Located at milepost 266 off I-90 westbound	
New York Department of Economic Development	I-90	Clarence	Erie County	Located at milepost 412 off I-90 westbound	
New York Department of Economic Development	I-90	Clifton Springs	Ontario County	Located at milepost 337 off I-90 eastbound	
New York Department of Economic Development	I-495	Dix Hills	Suffolk County	Located between exits 51 and 52 off I-495 eastbound	
New York Department of Economic Development	I-90	Frankfort	Herkimer County	Located at milepost 227 off I-90 westbound	
New York Department of Economic Development	I-87	Kingston	Ulster County	Located at milepost 96 off I-87 southbound	
New York Department of Economic Development	I-81	Kirkwood	Broome County	Located at exit 2 off I-81 northbound	
New York Department of Economic Development	I-90	Le Roy	Genesee County	Located at milepost 376 off I-90 westbound	
New York Department of Economic Development	I-87	New Baltimore	Greene County	Located at milepost 127 off I-87	
New York Department of Economic Development	I-87	Newburgh	Orange County	Located at milepost 66 (northbound) and milepost 65 (southbound) off I-87	
New York Department of Economic Development	I-90	Oneida	Madison County	Located at milepost 244 off I-90 eastbound	
New York Department of Economic Development	I-90	Phelps	Ontario County	Located at milepost 324 off I-90 westbound	
New York Department of Economic Development	I-90	Port Byron	Cayuga County	Located at milepost 310 off I-90 eastbound	
New York Department of Economic Development	I-87	Saugerties	Ulster County	Located at milepost 103 off I-87 northbound	
New York Department of Economic Development	I-90	Schenectady	Schenectady County	Located at milepost 153 off I-90 eastbound	
New York Department of Economic Development	I-90	Scottsville	Monroe County	Located at milepost 366 off I-90 eastbound	
New York Department of Economic Development	I-87	Suffern	Rockland County	Located at milepost 33 off I-87	
New York Department of Economic Development	I-90	Syracuse	Onondaga County	Located at milepost 280 off I-90 eastbound	
New York Department of Economic Development	I-90	Victor	Ontario County	Located at milepost 350 off I-90 westbound	
New York Department of Economic Development	I-90	Warners	Onondaga County	Located at milepost 292 off I-90 westbound	
North Carolina Department of Commerce, Division of Tourism, Film, and Sports Development	I-77	Charlotte	Mecklenburg County	Located at exit 1 off I-77 northbound	
North Carolina Department of Commerce, Division of Tourism, Film, and Sports Development	I-26	Columbus	Polk County	Located at exit 67 off I-26 westbound	
North Carolina Department of Commerce, Division of Tourism, Film, and Sports Development	I-77	Dobson	Surry County	Located at exit 105 off I-77 southbound	
North Carolina Department of Commerce, Division of Tourism, Film, and Sports Development	I-85	Kings Mountain	Cleveland County	Located at exit 2 off I-85 northbound	
North Carolina Department of Commerce, Division of Tourism, Film, and Sports Development	I-85	Norlina	Warren County	Located at exit 231 off I-85 southbound	
North Carolina Department of Commerce, Division of Tourism, Film, and Sports Development	I-26	Mars Hill	Madison County	Located at exit 6 off I-26 eastbound	
North Carolina Department of Commerce, Division of Tourism, Film, and Sports Development	I-95	Pleasant Hill	Northampton County	Located at exit 181 off I-95 southbound	
North Carolina Department of Commerce, Division of Tourism, Film, and Sports Development	I-95	Rowland	Robeson County	Located at exit 5 off I-95 northbound	
North Carolina Department of Commerce, Division of Tourism, Film, and Sports Development	I-40	Waynesville	Haywood County	Located at exit 10 off I-40 eastbound	
North Dakota Department of Transportation	I-94	Beach	Golden Valley County	Located at exit 2 off I-94	
North Dakota Department of Transportation	I-94	Bismarck area	Burleigh County	Called Apple Creek and about 8 miles (13 km) east of Bismarck, located at exit 169 off I-94 westbound and exit 169 eastbound	
North Dakota Department of Transportation	I-29	Fargo area	Cass County	Called Elm River and 35 miles (56 km) north of Fargo, located at exit 99 off I-29 northbound and exit 100 southbound	
North Dakota Department of Transportation	I-29	Grand Forks area	Walsh County	Called Alexander Henry and 37 miles (60 km) north of Grand Forks, is located at exit 178 off I-29	
North Dakota Department of Transportation	I-29	Hankinson	Richland County	Called Lake Agassiz, located at exit 3 off I-29 northbound	
North Dakota Department of Transportation	I-94	Jamestown area	Stutsman County	Called Jamestown and 4 miles (6.4 km) west of Jamestown, located at exit 254 off I-94 westbound and exit 255 eastbound	
North Dakota Department of Transportation	I-94	New Salem area	Morton County	Called Hailstone Creek and 8 miles (13 km) east of New Salem, located at exit 119 off I-94 westbound and exit 120 eastbound	
Ohio Department of Transportation (Note: The Ohio Department of Transportation's Facilities and Equipment Management Division owns, administers, and maintains Tourist Information Centers (TICs) in Ohio.)	I-75	Bowling Green	Wood County	Located off I-75 at milepost 178	
Ohio Department of Transportation	Corner of Broad Street and High Street	Columbus	Franklin County	Located in the Ohio Statehouse	
Ohio Department of Transportation	I-90	Conneaut	Ashtabula County	Located off I-90 westbound, 1 mile (1.6 km) from the Pennsylvania state line	
Ohio Department of Transportation	I-80	Hubbard	Trumbull County	Located off I-80 westbound 1 mile (1.6 km) from the Pennsylvania state line	
Ohio Department of Transportation	I-71	Lebanon	Warren County	Located off I-71 at milepost 34	
Ohio Department of Transportation	US 23	Lucasville	Scioto County	Located off US 23 southbound at milepost SCI 16, accessible in both directions	
Ohio Department of Transportation	I-77	Marietta	Washington County	Located off I-77 northbound at milepost 3	
Ohio Department of Transportation	I-75	Monroe	Butler County	Located off I-75 northbound at milepost 28	
Ohio Department of Transportation	I-70	New Paris	Preble County	Located off I-70 eastbound 3 miles (4.8 km) from the Indiana state line	
Ohio Department of Transportation	I-70	St. Clairsville	Belmont County	Located off I-70 westbound at milepost 206	
Oklahoma Tourism and Recreation Department	I-35	Blackwell	Kay County	Located at exit 225 off I-35 southbound	
Oklahoma Tourism and Recreation Department	I-44	Bristow	Creek County	Located at exit 197 off I-44 eastbound	
Oklahoma Tourism and Recreation Department	I-44	Chandler	Creek County	Located at exit 167 off I-44 eastbound	
Oklahoma Tourism and Recreation Department	I-44	Chickasha	Grady County	Located at exit 85 off I-44	
Oklahoma Tourism and Recreation Department	US 69	Colbert area	Bryan County	Located 2 miles (3.2 km) north of the Oklahoma–Texas border	
Oklahoma Tourism and Recreation Department	I-40	Erick	Beckham County	Located at exit 9 off I-40 eastbound	
Oklahoma Tourism and Recreation Department	I-44	Kellyville	Creek County	Located at exit 207 off I-44 westbound	
Oklahoma Tourism and Recreation Department	7200 Southeast 29th Street	Midwest City	Oklahoma County		
Oklahoma Tourism and Recreation Department	123 Park Avenue	Oklahoma City	Oklahoma County	Oklahoma City Convention and Visitors Bureau	
Oklahoma Tourism and Recreation Department	2300 N. Lincoln Boulevard	Oklahoma City	Oklahoma County		
Oklahoma Tourism and Recreation Department	I-40	Sallisaw	Sequoyah County	Located at exit 314 off I-40 westbound	
Oklahoma Tourism and Recreation Department	I-44	Stroud	Creek County/Lincoln County	Located at exit 178 off I-44	
Oklahoma Tourism and Recreation Department	I-35	Thackerville	Love County	Located at exit 3 off I-35 northbound	
Oklahoma Tourism and Recreation Department	I-44	Tulsa	Rogers County	Located at exit 238 off I-44 northbound	
Oklahoma Tourism and Recreation Department	I-44	Vinita	Craig County	Located at exit 288 off I-44	
Oklahoma Tourism and Recreation Department	I-44	Walters	Cotton County	Located at exit 20 off I-44	
Oklahoma Tourism and Recreation Department	I-44	Wellston	Lincoln County	Located at exit 157 off I-44 westbound	
Oregon Tourism Commission	60 Lowe Road	Ashland	Jackson County		
Oregon Tourism Commission	111 West Marine Drive	Astoria	Clatsop County		
Oregon Tourism Commission	705 NW Bonnett Way, Suite 1000	Bend	Deschutes County	Given address is the most accurate one due to the Central Oregon Visitors Association moving in December 2012	
Oregon Tourism Commission	754 Olive Street	Eugene	Lane County		
Oregon Tourism Commission	137 NE 1st Street	Newport	Lincoln County	Location of the Oregon Coast Visitors Association	
Oregon Tourism Commission	I-84	Ontario	Malheur County	Located at exit 377 off I-84 westbound	
Oregon Tourism Commission	1726 Washington Street	Oregon City	Clackamas County		
Oregon Tourism Commission	I-5	Portland	Multnomah County	Located at exit 307 off I-5	
Oregon Tourism Commission	7000 NE Airport Way, Suite 2201	Portland	Multnomah County	Located in the baggage claim of Portland International Airport (PDX)	
Oregon Tourism Commission	100 Cline Avenue	Umatilla	Umatilla County		
Pennsylvania Department of Transportation (PennDOT)	I-476	Albrightsville	Carbon County	Located at exit 86 off I-476	
Pennsylvania Department of Transportation (PennDOT)	I-476	Allentown	Lehigh County	Located at exit 55 off I-476	
Pennsylvania Department of Transportation (PennDOT)	I-70/I-76	Bedford	Bedford County	Located at exit 147 on a concurrency off I-70 and I-76	
Pennsylvania Department of Transportation (PennDOT)	I-276	Bensalem	Bucks County	Located at exit 351 off I-276 westbound	
Pennsylvania Department of Transportation (PennDOT)	I-76	Bowmansville	Lancaster County	Located at exit 289 off I-76 eastbound	
Pennsylvania Department of Transportation (PennDOT)	I-70	Claysville	Washington County	Located at exit 5 off I-70 eastbound, approximately 5 miles (8.0 km) east of the Pennsylvania–West Virginia border	
Pennsylvania Department of Transportation (PennDOT)	I-80	Delaware Water Gap	Monroe County	Located at exit 310 off I-80 westbound, approximately 0.5 miles (0.80 km) west of the Pennsylvania–New Jersey border	
Pennsylvania Department of Transportation (PennDOT)	I-78	Easton	Northampton County	Located at exit 76 off I-78 westbound, approximately 0.5 miles (0.80 km) west of the Pennsylvania–New Jersey border	
Pennsylvania Department of Transportation (PennDOT)	I-76	Glenmoore	Chester County	Located at exit 304 off I-76 westbound	
Pennsylvania Department of Transportation (PennDOT)	I-81	Great Bend	Susquehanna County	Located at exit 232 off I-81 southbound, approximately 0.5 miles (0.80 km) south of the Pennsylvania–New York border	
Pennsylvania Department of Transportation (PennDOT)	I-81	Greencastle	Franklin County	Located at exit 2 off I-81 northbound, approximately 1.5 miles (2.4 km) north of the Pennsylvania–Maryland border	
Pennsylvania Department of Transportation (PennDOT)	I-76	Harrisonville	Fulton County	Located at exit 172 off I-76	
Pennsylvania Department of Transportation (PennDOT)	I-76	Hershey	Dauphin County	Located at exit 258 off I-76 westbound	
Pennsylvania Department of Transportation (PennDOT)	I-76	Irwin	Westmoreland County	Located at exit 63 off I-76 eastbound	
Pennsylvania Department of Transportation (PennDOT)	I-276	King of Prussia	Montgomery County	Located at exit 328 off I-276 westbound	
Pennsylvania Department of Transportation (PennDOT)	I-95	Marcus Hook	Delaware County	Located immediately after the welcome to Pennsylvania sign on I-95 northbound	
Pennsylvania Department of Transportation (PennDOT)	I-84	Matamoras	Pike County	Located at exit 53 off I-84 westbound, approximately 1 mile (1.6 km) from the Pennsylvania–New Jersey border	
Pennsylvania Department of Transportation (PennDOT)	I-76	Middletown	Dauphin County	Located at exit 249 off I-76 eastbound	
Pennsylvania Department of Transportation (PennDOT)	I-295	Morrisville	Bucks County	Located at exit 10 off I-295 westbound	
Pennsylvania Department of Transportation (PennDOT)	I-79	Mount Morris	Greene County	Located at exit 6 off I-79 northbound, approximately 5 miles (8.0 km) from the Pennsylvania–West Virginia border	
Pennsylvania Department of Transportation (PennDOT)	I-70/I-76	New Stanton	Westmoreland County	Located at exit 77 on a concurrency off I-70 and I-76 westbound	
Pennsylvania Department of Transportation (PennDOT)	I-76	Newburg	Cumberland County	Located at exit 202 off I-76 westbound	
Pennsylvania Department of Transportation (PennDOT)	I-90	North East	Erie County	Located at exit 46 off I-90 westbound, approximately 0.5 miles (0.80 km) from the Pennsylvania–New York border	
Pennsylvania Department of Transportation (PennDOT)	I-76	Plainfield	Cumberland County	Located at exit 219 off I-76 eastbound	
Pennsylvania Department of Transportation (PennDOT)	I-83	Shrewsbury	York County	Located at exit 2 off I-83 northbound, approximately 2.5 miles (4.0 km) from the Pennsylvania–Maryland border	
Pennsylvania Department of Transportation (PennDOT)	I-70/I-76	Somerset	Somerset County	Located at exit 112 on a concurrency off I-70 and I-76	
Pennsylvania Department of Transportation (PennDOT)	I-70	Warfordsburg	Fulton County	Located at exit 171 off I-70 westbound, approximately 0.5 miles (0.80 km) west of the Pennsylvania–Maryland border	
Pennsylvania Department of Transportation (PennDOT)	I-76	Wayne	Delaware County	Located at exit 324 off I-76 eastbound	
Pennsylvania Department of Transportation (PennDOT)	I-80	West Middlesex	Mercer County	Located at exit 1 off I-80 eastbound, approximately 0.5 miles (0.80 km) east of the Pennsylvania–Ohio border	
Pennsylvania Department of Transportation (PennDOT)	I-90	West Springfield	Erie County	Located at exit 2 off I-90 eastbound	
Rhode Island Tourism Division (Note: Rhode Island's counties' governmental functions have been limited to acting as court administrative and sheriff corrections boundaries since 1846. Therefore, in this list, all counties in Rhode Island are given only as geographical references.)	Center Road	Block Island	Washington County	Location of the Block Island Tourism Council	
Rhode Island Tourism Division	4945 Old Post Road	Charlestown	Washington County	Location of the Charlestown Chamber of Commerce	
Rhode Island Tourism Division	23 Americas Cup Avenue	Newport	Newport County	Location of the Newport County Convention Bureau and the Gateway Visitors Center	
Rhode Island Tourism Division	175 Main Street, Suite 4	Pawtucket	Providence County	Location of the Blackstone Valley Tourism Council	
Rhode Island Tourism Division	4808 Tower Hill Road, Suite 101	Wakefield	Washington County	Location of the South County (Washington and Newport counties) Tourism Council	
South Carolina Department of Parks and Tourism	I-85	Blacksburg	Cherokee County	Located at exit 103 off I-85 southbound	
South Carolina Department of Parks and Tourism	I-95	Dillon	Dillon County	Located at exit 195 off I-95 southbound	
South Carolina Department of Parks and Tourism	I-85	Fair Play	Anderson County/Oconee County	Located immediately after the welcome to South Carolina sign on I-85 northbound	
South Carolina Department of Parks and Tourism	I-77	Fort Mill	Lancaster County/York County	Located at exit 89 off I-77 southbound	
South Carolina Department of Parks and Tourism	I-95	Hardeeville	Beaufort County/Jasper County	Located at exit 4 off I-95 northbound	
South Carolina Department of Parks and Tourism	I-26	Landrum	Spartanburg County	Located at exit 3 off I-26 eastbound	
South Carolina Department of Parks and Tourism	2121 Highway 17	Little River	Horry County	Located on US 17 southbound	
South Carolina Department of Parks and Tourism	I-20	North Augusta	Aiken County	Located immediately after the welcome to South Carolina sign off I-20 eastbound	
South Carolina Department of Parks and Tourism	I-95	Santee	Orangeburg County	Located at exit 99 off I-95 southbound	
South Dakota Department of Tourism	I-90	Chamberlain	Brule County	Located at exit 264 off I-90	
South Dakota Department of Tourism	I-29	New Effington	Roberts County	Located at exit 251 off I-29 southbound	
South Dakota Department of Tourism	I-90	Rapid City	Pennington County	Located at exit 61 off I-90	
South Dakota Department of Tourism	I-90	Salem	McCook County	Located at exit 363 off I-90 westbound and exit 362 eastbound	
South Dakota Department of Tourism	I-90	Spearfish	Lawrence County	Located at exit 1 off I-90 eastbound	
South Dakota Department of Tourism	I-90	Tilford	Meade County	Located at exit 41 off I-90 eastbound	
South Dakota Department of Tourism	I-90	Valley Springs	Minnehaha County	Located at exit 412 off I-90 westbound	
South Dakota Department of Tourism	I-29	Vermillion	Clay County	Located at exit 27 off I-29	
South Dakota Department of Tourism	I-90	Vivian	Lyman County	Located at exit 221 off I-90 westbound	
South Dakota Department of Tourism	I-90	Wasta	Pennington County	Located at exit 99 off I-90	
South Dakota Department of Tourism	I-29	Wilmot	Roberts County	Located at exit 214 off I-29	
Tennessee Department of Tourist Development	I-65	Ardmore	Giles County	Located at exit 3 off I-65 northbound	
Tennessee Department of Tourist Development	I-81	Bristol	Sullivan County	Located at exit 75 off I-81 southbound	
Tennessee Department of Tourist Development	I-40	Carthage	Smith County	Located at exit 267 off I-40	
Tennessee Department of Tourist Development	I-24	Chattanooga	Hamilton County	Located at exit 171 off I-24 eastbound	
Tennessee Department of Tourist Development	I-24	Clarksville	Montgomery County	Located immediately after the welcome to Tennessee sign off I-24 eastbound	
Tennessee Department of Tourist Development	I-155	Dyersburg	Dyer County	Located at exit 8 off I-155 northbound	
Tennessee Department of Tourist Development	I-75	East Ridge	Hamilton County	Located at exit 1 off I-75 northbound	
Tennessee Department of Tourist Development	I-26	Erwin	Unicoi County	Located at exit 46 off I-26 westbound	
Tennessee Department of Tourist Development	I-40	Hartford	Cocke County	Located at exit 446 off I-40 westbound	
Tennessee Department of Tourist Development	I-24	Jasper	Marion County	Located at exit 160 off I-24 westbound	
Tennessee Department of Tourist Development	I-75	Jellico	Campbell County	Located at exit 161 off I-75 southbound	
Tennessee Department of Tourist Development	I-40	Memphis	Shelby County	Located at exit 1 off I-40	
Tennessee Department of Tourist Development	I-55	Memphis	Shelby County	Closed until further notice	
Tennessee Department of Tourist Development	119 North Riverside Drive	Memphis	Shelby County		
Tennessee Department of Tourist Development	716 South Shady Street	Mountain City	Johnson County	Location of the Johnson County Chamber of Commerce	
Tennessee Department of Tourist Development	312 Rosa L. Parks Avenue, 24th Floor	Nashville	Davidson County	Called Tennessee Towers, headquarters for the state Department of Tourist Development	
Tennessee Department of Tourist Development	2450 Parkway	Pigeon Forge	Sevier County	Location of the Pigeon Forge Department of Tourism	
Tennessee Department of Tourist Development	I-65	Portland	Robertson County	Located at exit 121 off I-65 southbound	
Texas Department of Transportation	I-40	Amarillo	Potter County/Randall County	Located at exit 76 off I-40	
Texas Department of Transportation	I-10	Anthony	El Paso County	Located at exit 1 off I-10 eastbound	
Texas Department of Transportation	112 East 11th Street	Austin	Travis County		
Texas Department of Transportation	US 69/US 75	Denison	Grayson County	Located at exit 75 off US 69/US 75	
Texas Department of Transportation	I-35	Gainesville	Cooke County	Located at exit 502 off I-35 southbound	
Texas Department of Transportation	2021 W. Harrison	Harlingen	Cameron County		
Texas Department of Transportation	US 90	Langtry	Val Verde County	Located off US 90 westbound and State Loop 25 at Torres Avenue	
Texas Department of Transportation	I-35	Laredo	Webb County	Located at exit 18 off I-35 northbound	
Texas Department of Transportation	I-10	Orange	Orange County	Located at exit 879 off I-10 westbound	
Texas Department of Transportation	I-30	Texarkana	Bowie County	Located at exit 223 off I-30 westbound	
Texas Department of Transportation	I-20	Waskom	Harrison County	Located at exit 635 off I-20 westbound	
Texas Department of Transportation	I-44	Wichita Falls	Wichita County	Located at exit 1C off I-44 northbound	
Utah (Note: Utah's welcome centers are administered and maintained by the Utah Office of Tourism, which is a subsidiary office of the Governor's Office of Economic Development.)	I-15	Brigham City	Box Elder County	Located at exit 369 off I-15 southbound	
Utah	I-80	Coalville	Summit County	Located at exit 171 off I-80 westbound	
Utah	US 40	Jensen	Uintah County	Located at the junction of US 40 westbound and SR-149, approximately 13 miles (21 km) southeast of Vernal, Utah and 17 miles (27 km) west of the Utah–Colorado border	
Utah	300 N. State Street	Salt Lake City	Salt Lake County	Headquarters of the Utah Office of Tourism	
Utah	1835 Dixie Convention Center Drive	St. George	Washington County	Located at exit 2 off I-15 northbound	
Utah	I-70	Thompson Springs	Grand County	Located at exit 188 off I-70 westbound	
Vermont (Note: Vermont's welcome centers are administered and maintained by the Vermont Information Centers Division, which is a division of the Department of Buildings and General Services, which is, in turn, a subsidiary department of the Vermont Agency of Administration.)	US 2	Alburgh	Grand Isle County	Located near Vermont's border with New York State and the Canadian province of Quebec	
Vermont	I-91	Brattleboro	Windham County	Located at milepost 6 off I-91 northbound	
Vermont	US 7/VT 279	Bennington	Bennington County		
Vermont	I-91	Derby	Orleans County	Located at milepost 176 off I-91 southbound	
Vermont	VT 4A	Fair Haven	Rutland County	Located at the Vermont–New York border	
Vermont	I-89	Sharon	Windsor County	Located between exits 1 and 2 off I-89 northbound	
Vermont	134 State Street	Montpelier	Washington County	Location of the Capitol Region Visitor Center	
Vermont	I-93	Waterford	Caledonia County	Located at milepost 1 off I-93 northbound	
Vermont	100 Railroad Row	White River Junction	Windsor County	Located in the Amtrak station	
Virginia Tourism Corporation (Note: Virginia has 38 independent cities, which are politically equivalent to counties.)	I-85	Bracey	Mecklenburg County	Located immediately after the welcome to Virginia sign off I-85 northbound	
Virginia Tourism Corporation	66 Island Road	Bristol	Independent city	Can be accessed northbound or southbound by taking exit 74A off I-81 (in Tennessee) to US 11W (State Street)	
Virginia Tourism Corporation	I-81	Clear Brook	Frederick County	Located at exit 321 off I-81	
Virginia Tourism Corporation	One Welcome Center Drive	Covington	Independent city		
Virginia Tourism Corporation	I-95	Fredericksburg	Independent city	Located at exit 131 off I-95 southbound	
Virginia Tourism Corporation	I-77	Lambsburg	Carroll County	Located immediately after the welcome to Virginia sign off I-77 northbound	
Virginia Tourism Corporation	9915 Vandor Lane	Manassas	Independent city		
Virginia Tourism Corporation	US 13	New Church	Accomack County	Located immediately after the welcome to Virginia sign off US 13 southbound	
Virginia Tourism Corporation	I-64	New Kent	New Kent County	Located at exit 213 off I-64 eastbound	
Virginia Tourism Corporation	101 N. 9th Street	Richmond	Independent city	Called Bell Tower, is located on the grounds of the Virginia State Capitol	
Virginia Tourism Corporation	I-77	Rocky Gap	Bland County	Located at exit 7 off I-77 southbound	
Virginia Tourism Corporation	I-95	Skippers	Greensville County	Located immediately after the welcome to Virginia sign off I-95 northbound	
Washington State Department of Transportation	I-5	Bellingham	Whatcom County	There are two welcome centers located near Bellingham, one at exit 238 off I-5 southbound and the other one at exit 267 northbound	
Washington State Department of Transportation	SR 14	Bingen	Klickitat County	Located at exit 73 off SR 14	
Washington State Department of Transportation	I-90/I-82	Ellensburg	Kittitas County	There are two welcome centers located near Ellensburg, one at exit 89 off I-90 westbound and the other one at exit 24 off I-82 eastbound	
Washington State Department of Transportation	SR 401	Naselle	Pacific County	Located at milepost 1 on SR 401	
Washington State Department of Transportation	I-5	Ridgefield	Clark County	Located at exit 11 off I-5 northbound and exit 12 southbound	
Washington State Department of Transportation	I-82	Yakima	Yakima County	There are two welcome centers located near Yakima, one at exit 22 off I-82 westbound and the other one at exit 80	
West Virginia Department of Commerce	West Virginia Turnpike	Beckley	Raleigh County	Located at exit 45 off I-77	
West Virginia Department of Commerce	I-68	Bruceton Mills	Preston County	Located at milepost 31 off I-68 westbound	
West Virginia Department of Commerce	I-81	Falling Waters	Berkeley County	Located at milepost 25 off I-81	
West Virginia Department of Commerce	I-64	Huntington	Cabell County/Wayne County	Located at milepost 10 on I-64 eastbound	
West Virginia Department of Commerce	I-81	Inwood	Berkeley County	Located at milepost 2 off I-81 northbound	
West Virginia Department of Commerce	I-79	Morgantown	Monongalia County	Located at milepost 159 off I-79 southbound	
West Virginia Department of Commerce	186 Greasy Ridge Road	Princeton	Mercer County	Located at exit 9 off the West Virginia Turnpike, which runs along I-77; two other service plazas are located at mileposts 18 and 72 northbound	
West Virginia Department of Commerce	I-64	White Sulphur Springs	Greenbrier County	Located at milepost 179 off I-64 westbound	
West Virginia Department of Commerce	I-77	Williamstown	Wood County	Located at exit 185 off I-77	
West Virginia Department of Commerce	I-70	Valley Grove	Ohio County	Located at milepost 13 off I-70 westbound	
Wisconsin Department of Tourism	I-39/I-90	Beloit	Rock County	Located at exit 187 off I-39 northbound and I-90 westbound	
Wisconsin Department of Tourism	I-90	La Crosse	La Crosse County	Located at exit 2 on I-90 eastbound	
Wisconsin Department of Tourism	1680 Bridge Street	Marinette	Marinette County		
Wisconsin Department of Tourism	I-94	Menomonie	Dunn County	Located at exit 43 off I-94	
Wisconsin Department of Tourism	275 West Business U.S. Route 151	Platteville	Grant County		
Wisconsin Department of Tourism	I-94	Pleasant Prairie	Kenosha County	Located at exit 347 on I-94 westbound	
Wisconsin Department of Tourism	305 Harborview Parkway	Superior	Douglas County		
Wyoming Office of Tourism	I-90	Beulah	Crook County	Located at exit 199 off I-90	
Wyoming Office of Tourism	I-25	Cheyenne	Laramie County	Located at exit 7 off I-25	
Wyoming Office of Tourism	I-80	Laramie	Albany County	Located at exit 323 off I-80	
Wyoming Office of Tourism	700 Valley View Drive	Sheridan	Sheridan County		
