= Railroad Square (disambiguation) =

Railroad Square may refer to:

- Railroad Square District in Santa Rosa, California
- Railroad Square in Tallahassee, Florida
