= 2024 Tallahassee tornadoes =

Two tornadoes in Florida

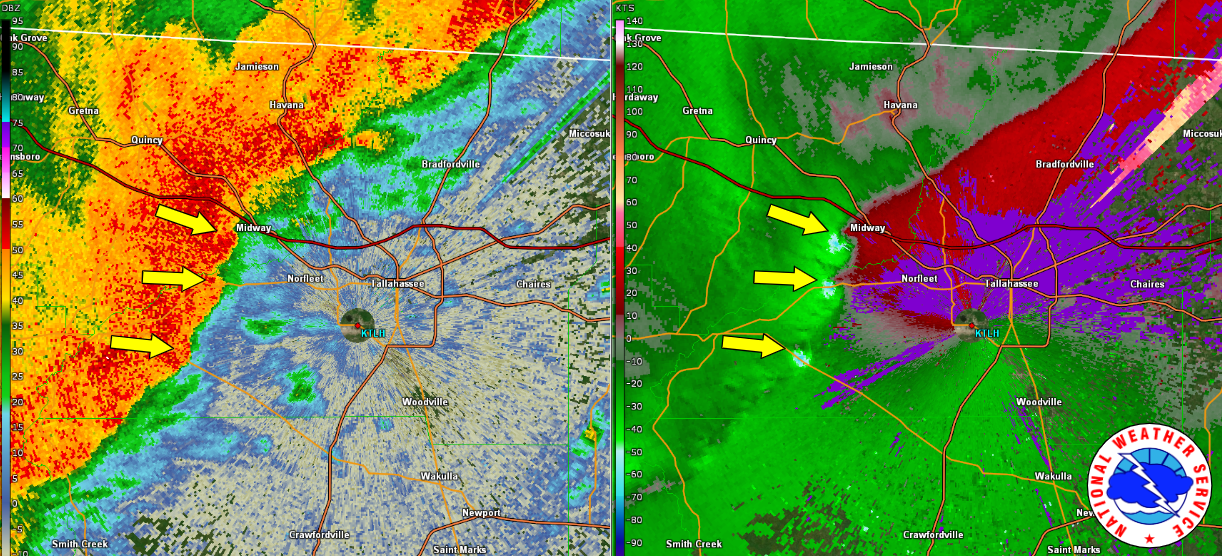
- Three simultaneous tornado circulations on NEXRAD radar imagery, the northern two of which would produce significant tornadoes in downtown Tallahassee

Meteorological history
- Date: May 10, 2024
- Formed: May 10, 2024, 6:38 a.m. EDT (UTC−04:00)
- Dissipated: May 10, 2024, 7:14 a.m. EDT (UTC−04:00)
- Duration: 36 minutes total from both tornadoes

EF2 tornado
- on the Enhanced Fujita scale
- Highest winds: 115 mph (185 km/h)

Overall effects
- Fatalities: 2
- Areas affected: Leon County, primarily Tallahassee
- Part of the tornado outbreak of May 6–10, 2024 and the tornadoes of 2024

On the morning of May 10, 2024, two significant tornadoes moved through Leon County, Florida, United States, both of which converged over Tallahassee. While damage was primarily to trees, numerous homes suffered damage. Tornadoes also damaged the campuses of numerous educational institutions across Tallahassee. Severe damage occurred to Railroad Square, and total damage caused by the storm was estimated at over $184 million (2024 USD).

== Meteorological synopsis ==
The Storm Prediction Center issued an Enhanced risk (3/5) for severe weather on May 10 for parts of northeastern Florida and southern Georgia. A strong upper-level trough over the Eastern United States produced a shortwave trough that would move from the lower Mississippi Valley towards the southeastern United States. Outflow from convection that spawned severe weather the previous few days would form a cold front that would move south through parts of Texas and the Southeast. These factors, in addition to favorable moisture and aloft westerly flow in the vicinity of the Florida panhandle, were expected to form a mesoscale convective system in the early morning hours. Severe weather over the rest of the Southeast, including the Carolinas, was expected to occur later in the day following the system moving offshore. Tallahassee was included in a Slight risk (2/5) area.

At 2:12 a.m. EDT, the Storm Prediction Center issued a mesoscale discussion over parts of the Southeast, which discussed the formation of a well-developed mesoscale convective system from south-central Alabama to southwestern Mississippi, which existed on the northern edge of an unstable airmass over the central Gulf Coast region. MLCAPE values of 2,500–3,500 J/kg, as estimated by the RAP forecast model, in addition to observed 0–6 km shear near 50 knots and 0–3 km storm-relative helicity values of 200–250 m^{2}/s^{2} would be favorable for the development of supercells and bowing line segments. These conditions would allow for an isolated tornado threat to develop along or ahead of the line, in addition to the threat of isolated severe wind gusts.

At 4:05 a.m., a severe thunderstorm watch was issued over the Florida panhandle and southern Georgia. Multiple squall lines with bowing segments had developed and were expected to continue tracking south-southeastward, with the primary threat being damaging wind gusts up to 80 mph (130 km/h), with risks for isolated large hail and tornadoes also outlined.

== Tornado summaries ==
Radar mosaic of storms moving across the Southeastern United States on the morning of May 10, 2024

=== First tornado ===
The first tornado that would impact Tallahassee touched down in Gadsden County, Florida at 6:36 a.m. and tracked southeastward over forested areas, damaging a barn and causing tree damage, before entering Leon County. Here, a mobile home park suffered extensive tree damage, and several homes sustained damage from falling trees at Emily Loop. The tornado then crossed US 90, where it caused damage to a shopping center and a hotel at the intersection of SR 263 and US 90. After crossing Capital Circle, the tornado approached Blountstown Highway while intensifying to EF2 strength. An automotive repair building on the highway suffered EF2 damage, while 75 ft (23 m) above the ground, a swath of tree damage with nearly all pine trees snapped at a similar height was surveyed, an area of damage that would extend across Pat Thomas Boulevard.

==== Educational institutions and Railroad Square ====
The tornado then approached the campuses of Lively Technical College and Tallahassee Community College, Impact at the latter included 400 trees downed on campus, numerous campus buildings sustaining damage, two Tallahassee Community College-owned trucks being declared a complete loss, and an electrical substation that provided energy to the site being destroyed. renamed later that year to Tallahassee State College. The next area to be impacted was a high-density residential area, where widespread EF1 damage occurred.

The tornado next struck the Tallahassee campus of Florida State University, which was between semesters and as such had very few on-site students and staff. Power to the campus was cut. Areas near the University Center and Dick Howser Stadium sustained damage. The FSU Flying High Circus tent was also destroyed.

On Gaines Street, the tornado damaged multiple businesses, and a construction crane collapsed. At Railroad Square, multiple warehouses suffered severe damage. Damage was compared to that of Hurricane Andrew in Miami, with one art gallery being entirely destroyed. Multiple buildings in the vicinity of the art district lost their roofs. In addition, the roof of a railway depot suffered severe damage.

==== Downtown Tallahassee and dissipation ====
South of the Florida State Capitol in downtown Tallahassee near the Florida Department of Education building, the tornado continued to damage trees, while also turning southward as it began to interact with the second tornado to the south of it. Further damage occurred in Myers and Cascades Parks before the tornado passed through Country Club Estates and the Capital City Country Club, after which its damage path converged with the southern tornado.

=== Second tornado ===
This tornado touched down at 6:50 a.m. at Williams Landing on Lake Talquin, initially travelling east-southeast while doing EF1 damage to trees before crossing the intersection of Blountstown Highway and Ft. Braden Trail Road, where it began tracking due east. Further damage occurred at Lake Talquin State Park, including tree damage. The tornado then entered Tallahassee proper and struck the neighborhoods of Seminole Manor and Mabry Manor, before approaching Florida A&M University, where more tree damage occurred, and roof damage to at least two of the institution's buildings occurred. At Bragg Memorial Stadium at Florida A&M, a light tower was folded in half. Widespread EF0 shingle damage occurred to homes and businesses along this part of the track.

Over the Capital City Country Club, the northern tornado's damage path converged with the southern one's, with the southern of the two becoming the apparent dominant circulation. The now-dominant tornado would produce EF2 damage to trees between the country club and the Indian Head Acres subdivision, where numerous trees were snapped at a height of about 75 ft (23 m) by winds estimated at 115 mph (185 km/h). Following this, EF1 damage to trees would occur as the tornado tracked through the Paradise Village East subdivision of Tallahassee, before crossing US 27 where more tree damage occurred, and dissipating upon reaching the border of Leon and Jefferson County. The southern tornado had a path length of 24.81 mi (39.93 km) and reached a peak width of 1,400 yd (1,300 m) over downtown Tallahassee. Two fatalities occurred; one occurred when a tree fell on a mobile home, and a second person was killed when another tree fell on someone who was outdoors at the time.

== Aftermath ==
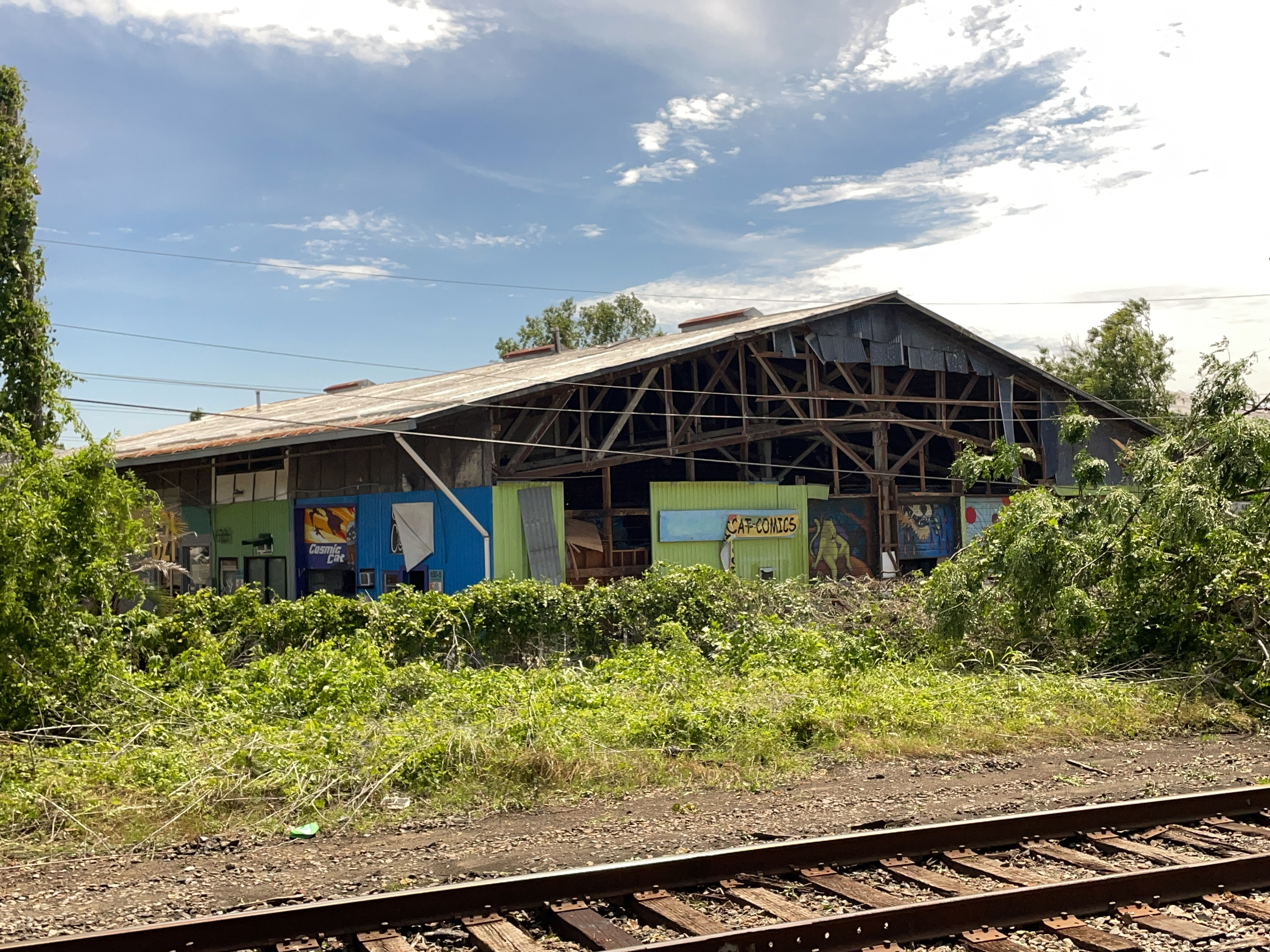
EF1 damage to a warehouse at Railroad Square

Governor of Florida Ron DeSantis declared a state of emergency for several counties in Florida, including Leon, on May 10. Over 66,000 power outages were recorded at one point, including half of Tallahassee itself. 100 power poles were downed during the event, a figure higher than the amount broken during hurricanes Hermine, Michael, and Idalia combined.

The cost to the city of Tallahassee was $50 million as of May 31, 2024; however, the toll was rising, and the possibility of the final cost reaching $100 million eventually was noted. From Leon County, the final cost was $8.3 million, $7.3 million of which would go towards debris cleanup, with an additional $1 million set aside to assist property owners in affected areas. Based on the median price of property in Tallahassee, the National Centers for Environmental Information estimated that combined damage from both tornadoes would total $184.1 million (2024 USD). Individual damage costs for both tornadoes were determined by splitting the total in half, as both merged over Tallahassee.

Railroad Square was reopened relatively quickly following the tornado. Various businesses suffered severe damage, with one closing permanently. The owners of Railroad Square stated that the building will never be able to be completely rebuilt due to the site's historic warehouse housing conflicting with modern building codes.

== See also ==
- 2021 Bowling Green tornadoes
- 1974 Tanner tornadoes
