= Santa Rosa Downtown station =

Railway station in Santa Rosa, California, U.S.

Santa Rosa Downtown
- A northbound train at Santa Rosa Downtown station in 2018

General information
- Location: 7 4th Street, Santa Rosa, California; United States
- Coordinates: 38.4377°N 122.7218°W
- Elevation: 154.2 ft (47.0 m)
- Line: SMART Mainline Subdivision
- Platforms: 1 island platform
- Tracks: 2

Construction
- Accessible: Yes

Other information
- Station code: SMART: SRD
- Fare zone: 4

History
- Opened: 1903; July 1, 2017 (SMART preview); August 25, 2017 (SMART full service)
- Closed: November 10, 1958 (NWP)
- Former names: Santa Rosa

Services
Preceding station	SMART	Following station
Santa Rosa North toward Windsor	SMART	Rohnert Park toward Larkspur
Former services
Preceding station	Northwestern Pacific Railroad	Following station
Healdsburg toward Eureka	Redwood	Cotati toward San Rafael
Fulton toward Eureka	San Francisco to Eureka	Bellvue toward Sausalito Ferry Terminal
Kenilworth toward Sebastopol	Sebastopol Branch	Terminus
Preceding station	Petaluma and Santa Rosa Railroad	Following station
South Side toward Petaluma	Main Line	Court House toward MacDonald
- NWP Depot
- U.S. Historic district – Contributing property
- Built by: Northwestern Pacific Railroad
- Part of: Railroad Square Historic District (ID79000561)
- Added to NRHP: April 20, 1979
Location

Santa Rosa Downtown station (known as Santa Rosa–Railroad Square during planning) is a Sonoma–Marin Area Rail Transit train station in Santa Rosa. It opened to SMART preview service on July 1, 2017; full commuter service commenced on August 25, 2017. It is located west of Wilson Street between 4th and 5th Streets, across the U.S. Route 101 freeway from downtown at the site of the ex-Northwestern Pacific Railroad station building. The station is the focal point of the Railroad Square Historic District, a National Register of Historic Places historic district designated in 1979.

== History ==
The original San Francisco and North Pacific Railroad reached Santa Rosa in 1870. Its depot was located at 4th Street. The city's horsecar system served the station between 1877 and about 1905. The freight and passenger depots were destroyed in a fire on July 5, 1903.

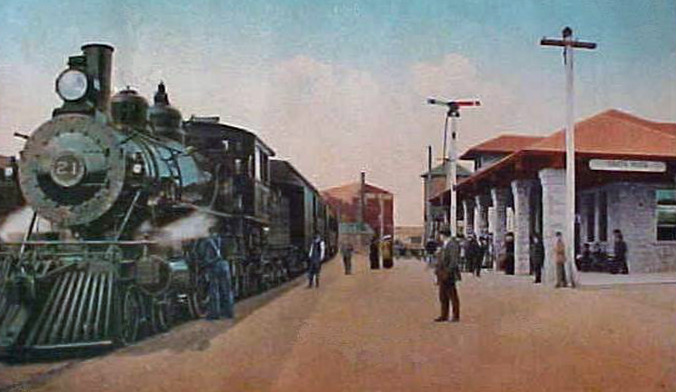
Postcard of a Northwestern Pacific Railroad train at the Santa Rosa station in 1911

The new Northwestern Pacific Railroad (NWP) Depot was built in 1903. Surviving the 1906 San Francisco earthquake, the station was eventually served by ten trains a day. Increased automobile ownership and highway construction led to decline of rail use in Sonoma County, thus leading to disuse of the facility as a passenger terminal around 1958. Alfred Hitchcock's 1943 film Shadow of a Doubt featured scenes filmed at the original NWP depot. Passenger service ended after November 10, 1958.

In 2008, the Handcar Regatta, a handcar race and arts festival, was put on in the Square utilizing the old tracks. The event continued annually between 2008 and 2011, but was not able to continue because of increased construction associated with the future SMART rail service.
