= Railroad Square District =

Historic district in California, United States

- Railroad Square
- U.S. National Register of Historic Places
- U.S. Historic district
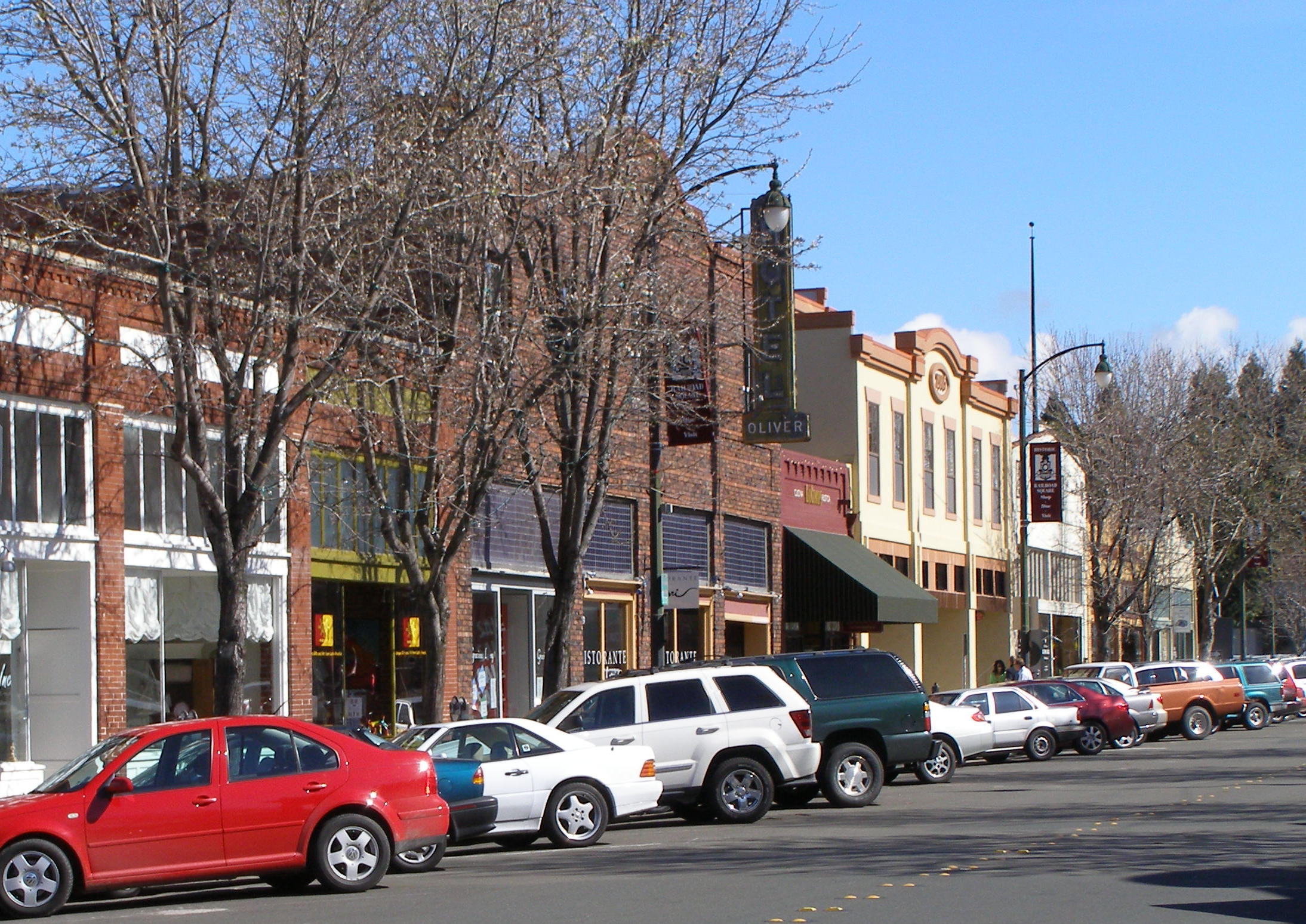

- Location within California Location within the United States
- Location: Santa Rosa, California
- NRHP reference No.: 79000561; 100012291 (decrease)

Significant dates
- Added to NRHP: April 20, 1979
- Boundary decrease: September 30, 2025

Railroad Square in downtown Santa Rosa, California is a historic district added to the National Register of Historic Places in 1979. The area is bounded by Third, Davis, Wilson, Sixth Streets, and Santa Rosa Creek.

== History ==
The Northwestern Pacific Railroad arrived in 1871 and promoted early development of the neighborhood, increasing the population of Santa Rosa from 1,000 to 5,000 within five years.

The neighborhood features primarily brick buildings constructed by stonemasons from Northern Italy, noted for withstanding the 1906 earthquake. Fifteen buildings deemed historically significant were constructed between 1888 and 1923. West of the railroad tracks, the growing Italian-American immigrant community developed the West End neighborhood of primarily single-family homes.

Construction of United States Highway 101 and California State Route 12 separated Railroad Square from the broader downtown. Consequently, the district has retained its historic character to a unique degree of architectural homogeneity. This separation also exacerbated economic hardship in the area from the Great Depression through the urban sprawl of the twentieth century. The construction of the Santa Rosa Plaza mall in the late 1970s saw a further detached Railroad Square develop into a skid row.

The Santa Rosa Downtown station has served Sonoma–Marin Area Rail Transit (SMART) commuter rail trains since 2017.

== Tourism ==
Railroad Square has recently positioned itself as a tourism center of Sonoma County's Redwood Empire and Wine Country, with 325 beds across three hotels in the district: the Hotel La Rose, built in 1907 and separately designated on the National Register of Historic Places; the Hyatt Vineyard Creek Hotel & Spa; and the Courtyard Marriott.

The free Railroad Square Music Festival has been held every June since 2015.
