= Railroad Square Art District =

Art district in Tallahassee, Florida, USA

Coordinates: 30.433°N 84.292°W

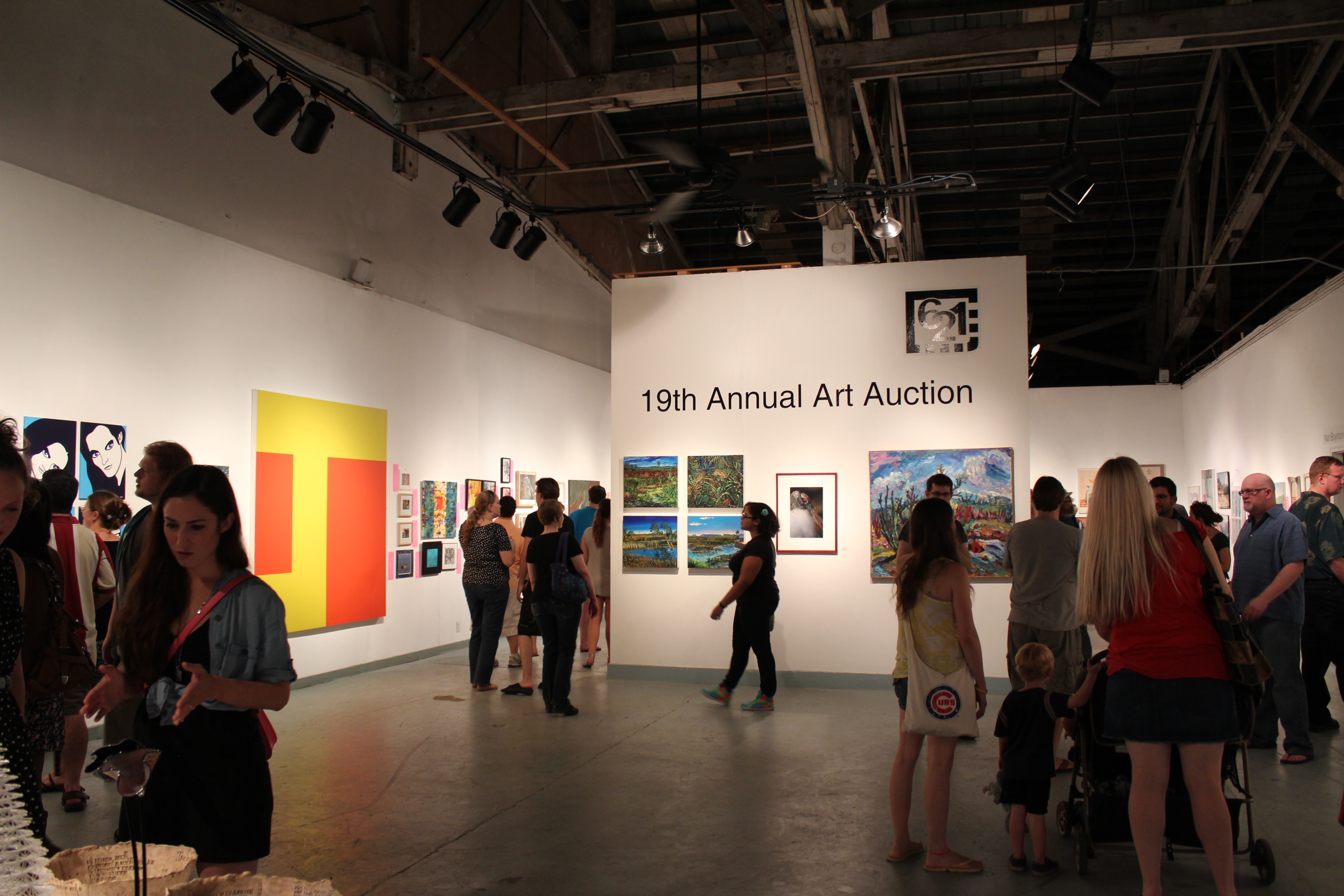
- Inside Gallery 621
- Type: Public Art Space and Shopping
- Location: 661 Railroad Square, Tallahassee, Florida, United States
- Area: 10 acres (4.0 ha)
- Established: 1970; 56 years ago
- Website: www.artdistrict.com/railroad-square

Railroad Square Art District is an arts, culture and entertainment district of Tallahassee, Florida, located off Railroad Avenue (south of the Amtrak station and FAMU), filled with a variety of metal art sculptures and murals, and stores selling artwork and collectibles.

In 2021, a skateable art park was added in partnership with Team Pain. The skatepark features Florida's longest snake-run.

== History ==
Railroad Square Art District is the site of the former McDonnell Lumber Company, and most of the warehouses there were originally constructed in the 1940s. The property later became the Downtown Industrial Park. Railroad Square claims to have originated as a World War II-era rail yard.

In the 1950s it was acquired by The Boynton Family, who renamed the site to Railroad Square in the 1980s. The park is now owned by Lily and Adam Boynton Kaye. The site has hosted a microbrewery, rock climbing gym, art galleries, art studios, and vintage shops, with over 70 tenants. Most tenants are located within railroad warehouses.

In January 2019, discussion began on the construction of a Hyatt hotel at the entrance of the park. The decision was met with a mixed reaction from the park’s pre-existing tenants. The hotel opened in February of 2021, and in December of 2021, it was sold to the minority-owned hoteliers Noble Investment Group.

=== Tornado damage ===
On May 10, 2024, the Railroad Square Art District was struck by an EF2 tornado, one of two in Tallahassee that day. Damage was compared to that of Hurricane Andrew in Miami, with one art gallery being entirely destroyed. Multiple buildings in the vicinity of the art district lost their roofs. Railroad Square was reopened relatively quickly following the tornado. Various businesses suffered severe damage, with one closing permanently. The owners of Railroad Square stated that the building will never be able to be completely rebuilt due to the site's historic warehouse housing conflicting with modern building codes.

== Art and galleries ==
A large portion of the spaces at Railroad Square are occupied by art studios. There are also a couple of galleries which host painting parties and arts and crafts events.

=== Mickee Faust Club ===
The Mickee Faust Club is a prominent local community theater organization that has been operating in Tallahassee since 1987 that operates an LGBTQ+ and disabled-inclusive venue on the south side of Railroad Square.

== First Fridays ==
On the first Friday of every month for the past twenty years, the district hosts the ‘First Friday Gallery Hop’ (known locally as ‘First Fridays’), an event in the evening featuring live music, open galleries, and food trucks. Business owners at Railroad Square report that these events are a crucial source of income.

== Gallery ==
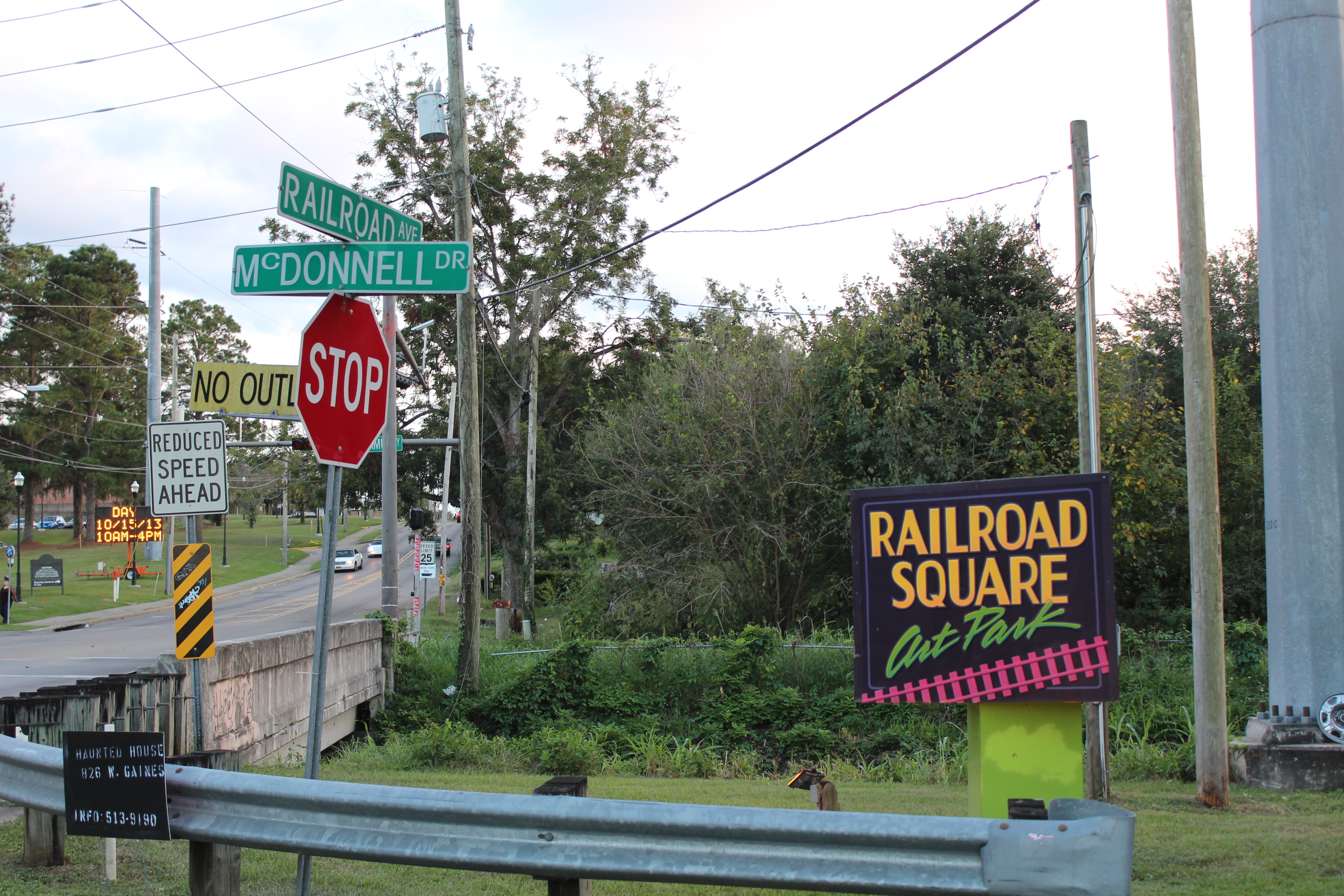
Entrance to Railroad Square.

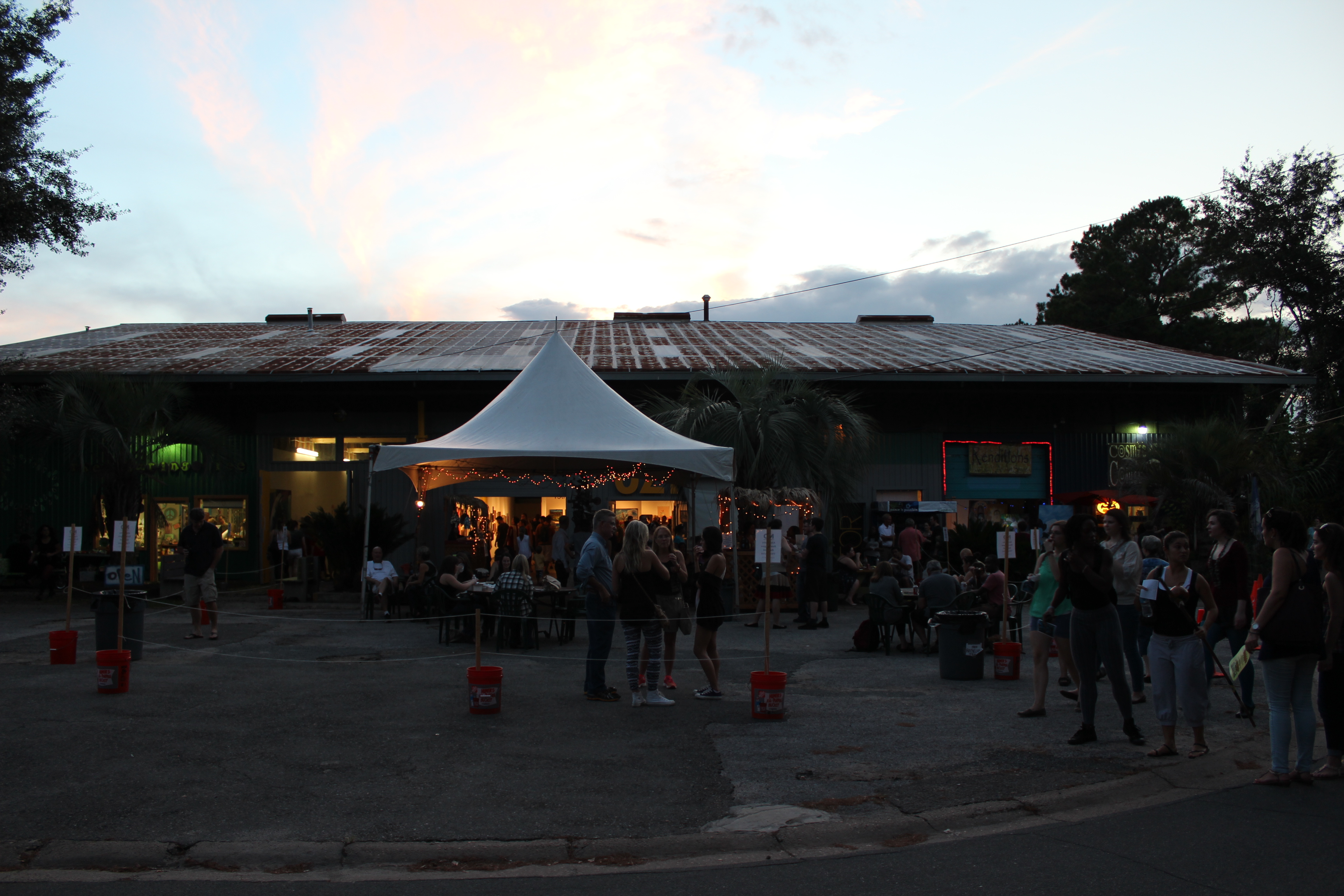
Typical First Friday night.

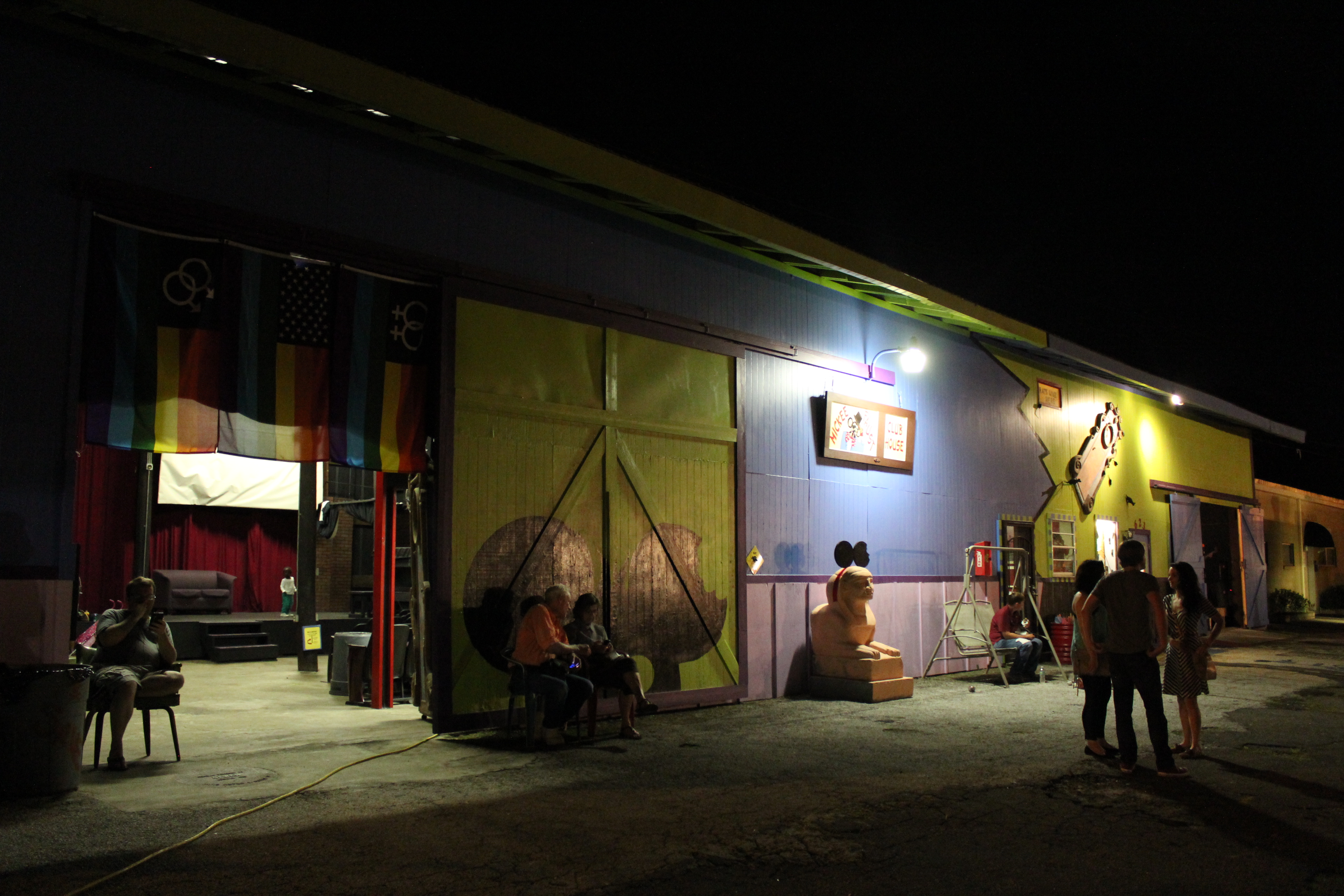
Mickee Faust Club House.

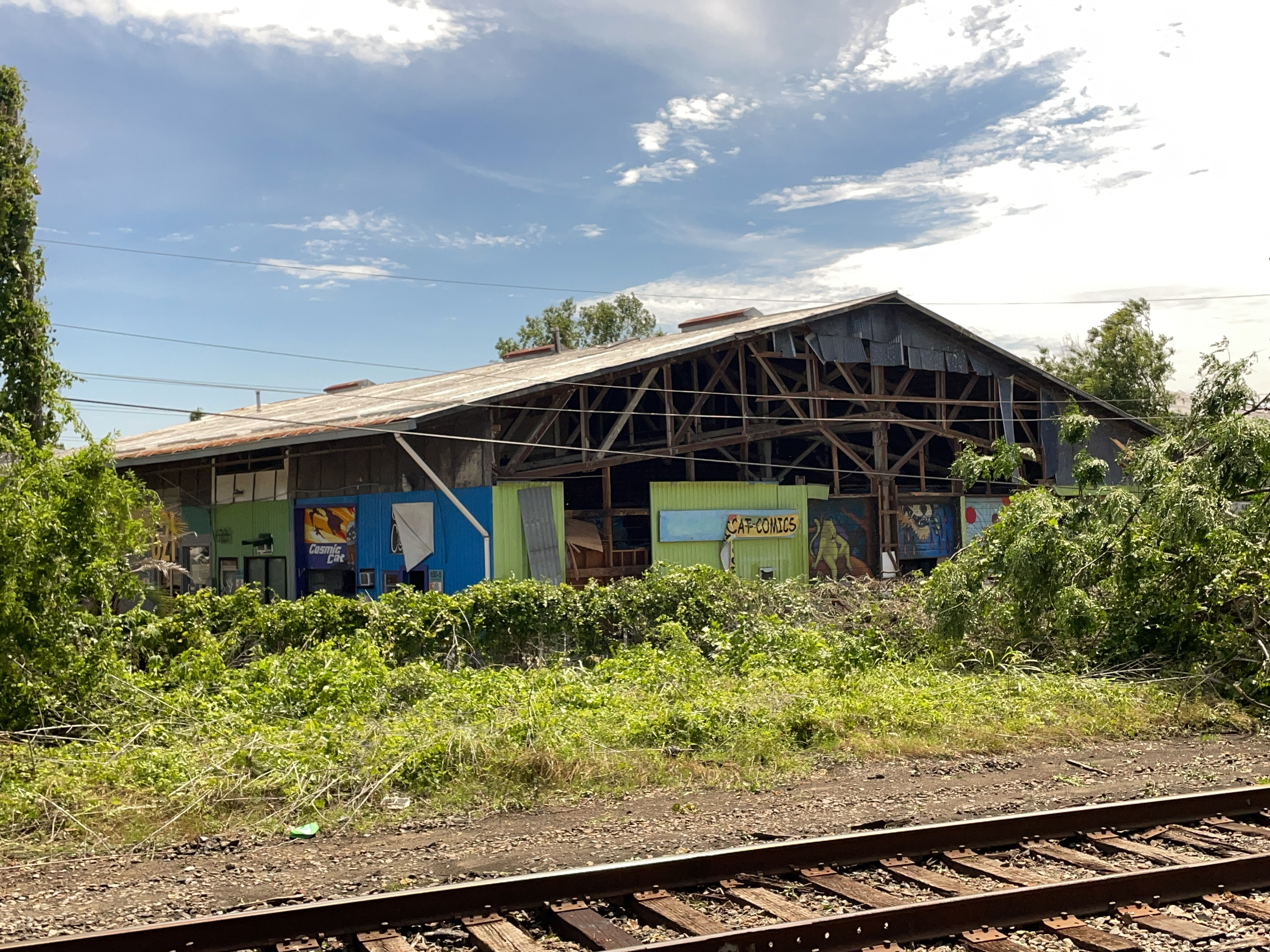
Tornado damage at Railroad Square from May 10, 2024.
