= National Register of Historic Places listings in Effingham County, Georgia =

Location of Effingham County in Georgia

This is a list of properties and districts in Effingham County, Georgia that are listed on the National Register of Historic Places (NRHP).

This National Park Service list is complete through NPS recent listings posted March 21, 2025.

== Current listings ==
	Name on the Register	Image	Date listed	Location	City or town	Description
1	Ash Farmhouse		January 29, 2025 (#100011427)	8603 Old Louisville Road; 32°30′25″N 81°31′17″W	Newington vicinity	
2	Ebenezer Townsite and Jerusalem Lutheran Church	Ebenezer Townsite and Jerusalem Lutheran Church	December 4, 1974 (#74000674)	East of Springfield on State Route 275 at the Savannah River; 32°22′36″N 81°10′51″W	Springfield	The church was built in 1769.
3	Effingham County Courthouse	Effingham County Courthouse	September 18, 1980 (#80001016)	State Route 21, 901 North Pine Street, Springfield; 32°22′27″N 81°18′54″W	Springfield	Built in 1908
4	Effingham County Jail	Effingham County Jail	September 20, 2006 (#06000845)	1002 N. Pine St. 32°22′28″N 81°18′58″W	Springfield	Built in 1935
5	Guyton Historic District	Guyton Historic District	September 30, 1982 (#82002408)	Bounded by the city limits on the east, south, and west, and Alexander Ave. on the north 32°20′07″N 81°23′34″W	Guyton	
6	New Hope AME Church	New Hope AME Church	March 13, 1986 (#86000364)	Alexander St. 32°20′32″N 81°23′30″W	Guyton	Built in 1885
7	Reiser-Zoller Farm	Reiser-Zoller Farm	March 2, 1989 (#89000152)	State Route 119, 4 miles north of Springfield; 32°24′49″N 81°16′55″W	Springfield	Built in 1900, the farmhouse is down a private drive
8	Springfield Historic District		April 2, 2021 (#100006329)	Roughly bounded by Railroad and 2nd Aves., Laberta Cir., Early, Cedar, 3rd and 4th Sts. 32°21′59″N 81°18′42″W	Springfield	
