= Old Effingham County Courthouse =

Historic courthouse in Georgia, US

- Effingham County Courthouse
- U.S. National Register of Historic Places
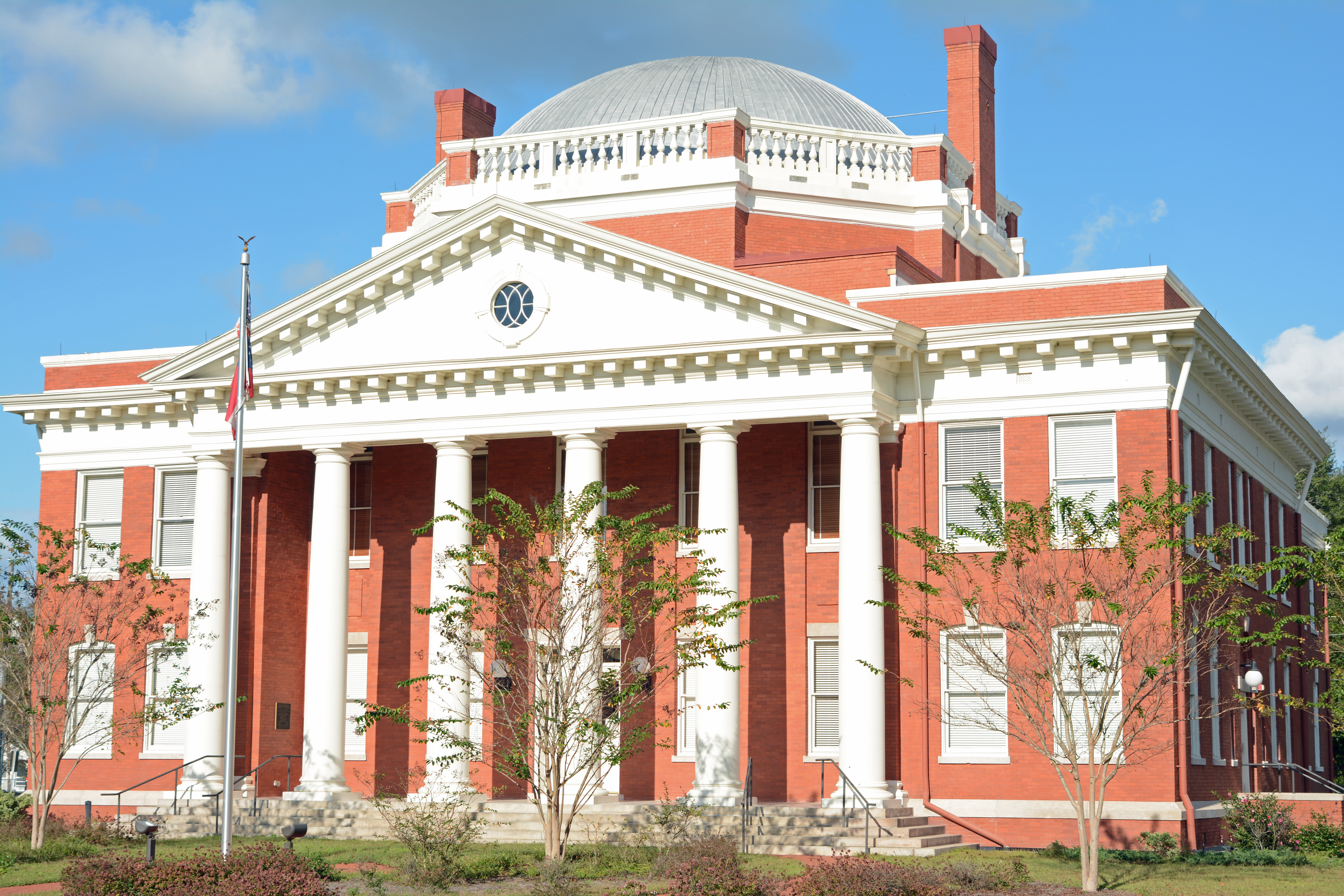
- The courthouse in 2015

- Location within Georgia Location within the United States
- Location: 901 N. Pine St., Springfield, Georgia
- Coordinates: 32.37412°N 81.31494°W
- Area: 1 acre (0.40 ha)
- Built: 1908–1909
- Architect: Hyman C. Whitcover
- Architectural style: Neoclassical (Palladian)
- MPS: Georgia County Courthouses TR
- NRHP reference No.: 80001016
- Added to NRHP: September 18, 1980

The Old Effingham County Courthouse is a historic county courthouse in Springfield, the county seat of Effingham County in east central Georgia. It is located on Georgia State Route 21, at 901 North Pine Street in Springfield.

The courthouse was designed by Savannah architect Hyman C. Whitcover and was built from 1908 to 1909 at a cost of $40,000, soon after George Mills Brinson's railroad was extended to Springfield in August 1907.

The courthouse is in the Neoclassical style, with Palladian aspects. The building replaced a previous county courthouse built in 1849.

The Old Effingham County Courthouse was added to the National Register of Historic Places on September 18, 1980.

Construction began on a new courthouse, officially the Effingham County Judicial Complex, in 2004, with construction complete by late 2006, occupation in January 2007, and a dedication ceremony in March 2007. The old courthouse is now used as the Effingham County district attorney's office. The offices of the county tax commissioner are also located in old courthouse. Other county administrative offices are located in separate building (formerly a church) near the new courthouse.

== See also ==
- National Register of Historic Places listings in Effingham County, Georgia
