= Effingham County School District =

School district in Georgia (U.S. state)

Address
- 405 North Ash Street Springfield, Effingham County, Georgia, 31329-4958; United States
- Coordinates: 32.373329°N 81.309505°W

District information
- Grades: K12
- Superintendent: Dr. Yancy Ford
- Accreditation: COGNIA

Students and staff
- Enrollment: ~14,000
- Staff: ~1,300

Other information
- Telephone: (912) 754-6491
- Fax: (912) 754-7033
- Website: www.effinghamschools.com

The Effingham County School District is a public school district in Effingham County, Georgia, United States, based in Springfield. It serves the communities of Guyton, Rincon, and Springfield.

== Schools ==
The Effingham County School District has eight elementary schools, three middle schools, two high schools, and the programs.

=== Elementary schools ===
- Blandford Elementary School
- Ebenezer Elementary School
- Guyton Elementary School
- Marlow Elementary School
- Rincon Elementary School
- Sand Hill Elementary School
- South Effingham Elementary School
- Springfield Elementary School

=== Middle schools ===
- Ebenezer Middle School
- Effingham County Middle School
- South Effingham Middle School

=== High schools ===
- Effingham County High School
- South Effingham High School

=== Programs ===
- enCompass Academy
- Effingham College & Career Academy
- Crossroads Academy
