= Effingham County High School =

Location
- 1589 GA Highway 119; Springfield, Georgia 31329-3008; United States; 32°20′50″N 81°21′04″W

Information
- Type: Public high school
- Established: 1956
- School district: Effingham County School District
- Principal: Greg Manior
- Teaching staff: 120.00 (FTE)
- Grades: 9-12
- Enrollment: 2,202 (2025)
- Student to teacher ratio: 18.03
- Campus type: Rural
- Colors: Navy, white and red
- Mascot: Rebel
- Newspaper: The Rebel
- Yearbook: The Rebel
- Website: Effingham County High School

Effingham County High School is one of two public high schools located in Effingham County, Georgia, northwest of Savannah. The school was created in 1956 and serves approximately 2000 students in grades 9-12 in the Effingham County School District. The school mascot is the Rebel, and the school colors are red, navy, and white.

== History ==
Effingham County High School was created in 1956 with the consolidation of Effingham County's smaller high schools. The campus was built just west of Springfield on Georgia Highway 119. A larger, more modern facility was opened in the fall of 1989 just west of the original campus. The old campus became Effingham County Middle School. In 2003, a new football stadium was built behind the current campus and the old Rebel Field (1961–2003) was dismantled.

In August 2009, a new Effingham County Middle School opened just west of the current ECHS. The old ECMS/ECHS was closed and demolition of the oldest sections began in 2010. No decision has been made about the future of the academic areas of the building. The gymnasium is currently being occupied by the ECHS Competition Cheerleading Squad and the Effingham County Wrestling Team.

The school has seen much growth over the years as Savannah and southeast Georgia continue to boom. The school grew to approximately 2000 students. A decision was made to split into two high schools, one that would serve the rapidly growing southern part of the county and the other (ECHS) that would continue serving the central and northern parts of the county. In 1996, South Effingham High School opened on Georgia Highway 30, just west of Rincon.

To further serve the two campuses, a new Effingham Career Academy was built next to Savannah Technical College's Effingham Campus on Georgia Highway 21 at Ebenezer Road. On August 5, 2010, the Effingham Career Academy had their dedication ceremony. The Career Academy was built for both high schools' advanced level CTAE/vocational classes. The Career Academy had its first day of classes on August 9, 2010. A STEM Academy was added onto the Career Academy, offering qualifying students more rigorous courses. The first day of class was August 4, 2016.

In August 2007 Effingham County School District implemented a county-wide dress code. Every school in the district requires black, khaki, or navy pants. Girls are also allowed to wear skirts or shorts that reach up to four inches above the back of the knees. The color of shirt changes between schools; at Effingham County High, students may wear navy, white, or black polos with three buttons and no logo. Students may also wear school-sponsored navy and white T-shirts. If a student is in a club or plays a sport, he may wear those T-shirts on Fridays or game days.

== Campus ==
The school is located in a rural area of central Effingham County, between Springfield and Guyton. The campus consists of a single school building and several portable classrooms. The approximate number of red bricks in the school is roughly 560,000. The number of white bricks in the school is about 36,000. Faculty and students have separate parking lots. The track encircles the large marching band practice field. Outdoor athletic facilities include softball, soccer, baseball, and football fields, and tennis courts.

A new freshman wing was added to the new school in 2006. In January 2026 the school opened the doors to a new addition including a science hallway, new band rooms, a new auxiliary gym, and a state of the art weight room.

== Faculty ==
Approximately 180 faculty and staff members are employed at Effingham County High School.

Principals:

- Gregory Manior (2024–Present)
- Amie Dickerson (2018–2024)
- Billy Hughes (2016–2018)
- Yancy Ford (2006–2016)
- John Arnold (2005–2006)
- Randy Shearouse (2003–2005)
- Dr. Paul M. Brinson (1999–2003)
- Harris Hinely (1989–1999)
- Robert Bonner (1980–1989)
- Ronnie Rush (1975–1980)
- Arthur Freeland (1974–1975)
- Ross Rountree (1956–1974)

Assistant Principal

- Blake Kessler (2006–Present)

=== Athletics ===
Effingham County's athletic teams are known as the Rebels. They compete in baseball, basketball, cheerleading (game and competition), cross country, fast-pitch softball, football, golf, soccer, tennis, track and field, volleyball, lacrosse, and wrestling.

Effingham County High School's biggest rival since its opening is the cross-county South Effingham High School. Others have included Statesboro High School and Benedictine Military School.

ECHS football was state runner-up in 1987. ECHS won the Traditional State Wrestling Title for AAAA in 2008-2009.

The girls' golf team won back-to-back region championships in 2009 and 2010 under Coach Curtis Stevens.

The cross country boys' team won the region title in fall 2009 and the girls were runners-up in fall 2009, all under Coach Mick Danielson.

=== State titles ===
- Baseball (1) - 1949(C)
- Traditional Wrestling (1) - 2009(4A)

=== Music ===
The Effingham County High Band consists of marching, wind ensemble, symphonic, and jazz bands which perform regularly throughout the year. The Rebel Regiment Marching Band has performed at various regional and national competitions, winning awards in several categories. The ECHS Bands are under the direction of Will Alford and Anthony Jones.

Effingham County High's Choral Department consists of several choirs, including show choir, women's, and mixed ensembles. They consistently score superior ratings in state and nationally adjudicated events and have performed at Disney World. The director of Choral Activities is Wes Perkins.

== Notable alumni ==
- Jon G. Burns, politician
- Paul Carrington, former NFL defensive end (Denver Broncos, Atlanta Falcons)
- Billy Currington, country music singer
- JaKeenan Gant (born 1996), basketball player for Hapoel Be'er Sheva of the Israeli Basketball Premier League
- Dusty Zeigler, former NFL center (Buffalo Bills, NY Giants)
