= Mr. Georgia Basketball =

American basketball award

Each year the Mr. Georgia Basketball award is given to the person chosen as the best high school boys basketball player in the U.S. state of Georgia. The award winner is selected by members of the Atlanta Tip Off Club.

== Award winners ==
Year	Player	High School	College	NBA/ABA draft
2026	Colben Landrew	Wheeler	UConn	
2025	Caleb Wilson	Holy Innocents'	North Carolina	2026 NBA draft: 1st Round, 4th overall by the Chicago Bulls
2024	Ace Bailey	McEachern	Rutgers	2025 NBA draft: 1st Round, 5th overall by the Utah Jazz
2023	Isaiah Collier	Wheeler	USC	2024 NBA draft: 1st Round, 29th overall by the Utah Jazz
2022	Bruce Thornton	Milton	Ohio State	2026 NBA draft: 2nd Round, 31st overall by the New York Knicks
2021	Jabari Smith Jr.	Sandy Creek High School	Auburn	2022 NBA draft: 1st Round, 3rd overall by the Houston Rockets
2020	Walker Kessler	Woodward Academy	North Carolina, Auburn	2022 NBA draft: 1st Round, 22nd overall by the Memphis Grizzlies
2019	Sharife Cooper	McEachern	Auburn	2021 NBA draft: 2nd Round, 48th overall by the Atlanta Hawks
2018	Ashton Hagans	Newton	Kentucky	
2017	Chuma Okeke	Westlake	Auburn	2019 NBA draft: 1st Round, 16th overall by the Orlando Magic
2016	Alterique Gilbert	Miller Grove High School	Connecticut, Wichita State	
2015	Jaylen Brown	Wheeler	California	2016 NBA draft: 1st Round, 3rd overall by the Boston Celtics
2014	JaKeenan Gant	Effingham County	Missouri, Louisiana	
2013	Brannen Greene	Tift County	Kansas	
2012	Tony Parker	Miller Grove High School	UCLA	
2011	Shannon Scott	Milton High School	Ohio State	
2010	Marcus Thornton	Westlake	Georgia	
2009	Derrick Favors	South Atlanta	Georgia Tech	2010 NBA draft: 1st Round, 3rd overall by the New Jersey Nets
2008	Al-Farouq Aminu	Norcross	Wake Forest	2010 NBA Draft: 1st Round, 8th overall by the Los Angeles Clippers
2007	Gani Lawal	Norcross	Georgia Tech	2010 NBA Draft: 2nd Round, 46th overall by the Phoenix Suns
2006	Javaris Crittenton	Southwest Atlanta Christian	Georgia Tech	2007 NBA draft: 1st Round, 19th overall by the Los Angeles Lakers
2005	Louis Williams	South Gwinnett	none	2005 NBA draft: 2nd Round, 45th overall by the Philadelphia 76ers
2004	Dwight Howard	Southwest Atlanta Christian	none	2004 NBA draft: 1st Round, 1st overall by the Orlando Magic
2003	Vincent Banks	South Atlanta	Miami, Cincinnati, Georgia Perimeter College, Garden City Community College	
2002	Wayne Arnold	Berkmar	Georgia, Tennessee State	
2001	Kwame Brown	Glynn Academy	none	2001 NBA draft: 1st Round, 1st overall by the Washington Wizards
2000	A. J. Moye	Westlake	Indiana	
1999	Donnell Harvey	Randolph-Clay	Florida	2000 NBA draft: 1st Round, 22nd overall by the New York Knicks
1998	Tony Akins	Berkmar	Georgia Tech	
1997	Dion Glover	Cedar Grove	Georgia Tech	1999 NBA draft: 1st Round, 20th overall by the Atlanta Hawks
1996	Pablo Machado	Tift County	Georgia Tech, Loyola	
1995	Shareef Abdur-Rahim	Wheeler	California	1996 NBA draft: 1st Round, 3rd overall by the Vancouver Grizzlies
1994	Shareef Abdur-Rahim	Wheeler	California	1996 NBA Draft: 1st Round, 3rd overall by the Vancouver Grizzlies
1993	Matt Harpring	Marist	Georgia Tech	1998 NBA draft: 1st Round, 15th overall by the Orlando Magic
1992	Jeff Sheppard	McIntosh	Kentucky	
1991	Dontonio Wingfield	Westover	Cincinnati	1994 NBA draft: 2nd Round, 37th overall by the Seattle SuperSonics
1990	James Forrest	Southside	Georgia Tech	
1989	James Forrest	Southside	Georgia Tech	
1988	Darrin Hancock	Griffin	Garden City Community College, Kansas	1994 NBA Draft: 2nd Round, 38th overall by the Charlotte Hornets
1987	Ivano Newbill	Southwest Macon	Georgia Tech	
1986	Darrin Hancock	Griffin	Garden City Community College, Kansas	1994 NBA Draft: 2nd Round, 38th overall by the Charlotte Hornets
1985	Eric Manuel	Southwest Macon	Kentucky	
1984	Steve Grayer	Southwest Macon	Wichita State	
1983	Chris Morris	Douglass	Auburn	1988 NBA draft: 1st Round, 4th overall by the New Jersey Nets
1982	Kenny Walker	Crawford County	Kentucky	1986 NBA draft: 1st Round, 5th overall by the New York Knicks

== See also ==
Miss Georgia Basketball
