= Shawnee, Georgia =

Unincorporated community in Georgia, U.S.

Coordinates: 32°28′33″N 81°24′29″W

Shawnee is an unincorporated community in Effingham County, in the U.S. state of Georgia.. It rests along Georgia State Route 21 to the south of Newington, GA and to the North of Springfield, GA. According to the 2020 census, the population is 3,380.

== History ==
A post office called Shawnee was established in 1910, and remained in operation until 1918. The community was named after the Shawnee Indians.
