= Jon G. Burns =

American politician (born 1952)

Jon Burns
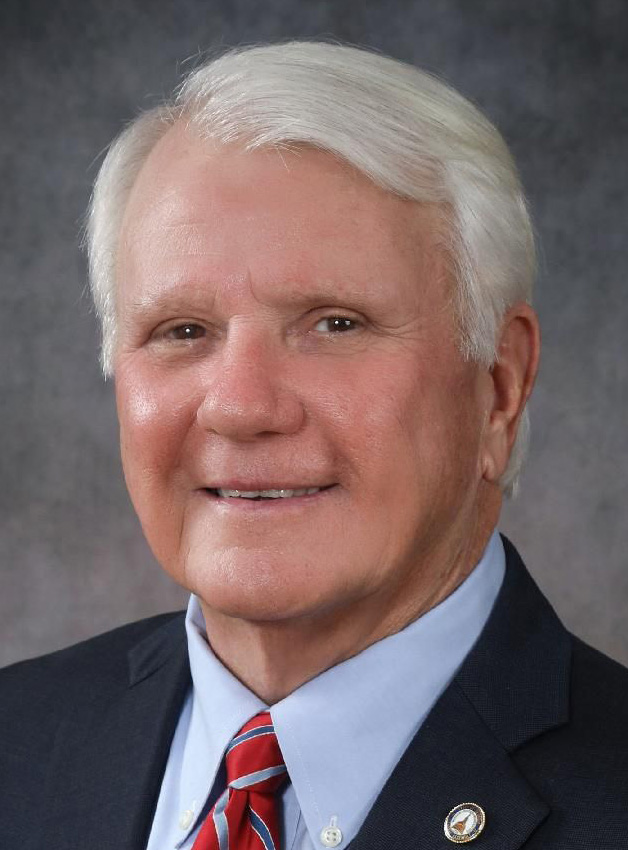
- Official portrait, 2025

75th Speaker of the Georgia House of Representatives
- Incumbent
- Assumed office January 9, 2023
- Preceded by: Jan Jones (Acting)

Majority Leader of the Georgia House of Representatives
- In office May 12, 2015 – January 9, 2023
- Preceded by: Larry O'Neal
- Succeeded by: Chuck Efstration

Member of the Georgia House of Representatives
- Incumbent
- Assumed office January 3, 2005
- Preceded by: Ray Holland
- Constituency: 157th District (2005–2013) 159th District (2013–Present)

Personal details
- Born: September 4, 1952 (age 74) Effingham County, Georgia, U.S.
- Party: Republican
- Spouse: Dayle Burns
- Children: 2
- Education: Georgia Southern University, Statesboro (BA); John Marshall Law School, Atlanta (JD)

Jon Guerry Burns (born September 4, 1952) is an American politician from the U.S. state of Georgia and the speaker of the Georgia House of Representatives since January 2023. Burns is a Republican member of the Georgia House of Representatives from District 159. Burns previously served District 157. Burns was the former Republican majority leader of Georgia House of Representatives, being succeeded by Chuck Efstration upon his election as speaker of the House of Representatives. He was selected as the speaker in November 2022, succeeding David Ralston due to his death.

== Early life ==
Burns was born in Effingham County, Georgia. Burns graduated from Effingham County High School.

== Education ==
Burns earned a bachelor's degree in political science from Georgia Southern University. Burns earned a JD from John Marshall Law School.

== Career ==
Burns served in the Georgia Army National Guard.

On November 2, 2004, Burns won the election and became a Republican member of Georgia House of Representatives for District 157. Burns defeated Woodrow Lovett with 65.05% of the votes. On November 7, 2006, as an incumbent, Burns won the election unopposed and continued serving District 157. On November 4, 2008, as an incumbent, Burns won the election unopposed and continued serving District 157. On November 2, 2010, as an incumbent, Burns won the election and continued serving District 157. Burns defeated Elizabeth N. Johnson with 67.36% of the votes.

On November 6, 2012, Burns won the election unopposed and became a Republican member of Georgia House of Representatives for District 159. On November 4, 2014, as an incumbent, Burns won the election unopposed and continued serving District 159. On November 8, 2016, as an incumbent, Burns won the election unopposed and continued serving District 159. On November 6, 2018, as an incumbent, Burns won the election unopposed and continued serving District 159. On November 3, 2020, as an incumbent, Burns won the election unopposed and continued serving District 159.

In 2015, Burns was elected as the majority leader of Georgia House of Representatives.

== Personal life ==
Burns's wife is Dayle Burns. They have two children. Burns and his family live in Newington, Georgia.

== See also ==
- 2013 152nd Georgia General Assembly
- 2015 153rd Georgia General Assembly
- 2017 154th Georgia General Assembly

Georgia House of Representatives
Preceded by Ray Holland	Member of the Georgia House of Representatives from the 157th district 2005–2013	Succeeded by Delvis Dutton
Preceded by Ann Purcell	Member of the Georgia House of Representatives from the 159th district 2013–Present	Incumbent
Political offices
Preceded by Larry O'Neal	Majority Leader of the Georgia House of Representatives; 2015–2023	Succeeded by Chuck Efstration
Preceded by Jan Jones; Acting	Speaker of the Georgia House of Representatives; 2023–Present	Incumbent
