= South Carolina Highway 119 =

State highway in South Carolina, United States

South Carolina Highway 119

Route information
- Maintained by SCDOT
- Length: 5.99 mi (9.64 km)

Major junctions
- South end: SR 119 at the Georgia state line near Clyo, GA
- North end: US 321 in Garnett

Location
- Country: United States
- State: South Carolina
- Counties: Jasper, Hampton

Highway system
- South Carolina State Highway System; Interstate; US; State; Scenic
← SC 118	→ SC 120

South Carolina Highway 119 (SC 119) is a 5.990-mile (9.640 km) state highway in the U.S. state of South Carolina. The highway connects the Georgia state line and Garnett.

== Route description ==
SC 119 begins at the Georgia state line, within Jasper County, where the roadway continues as Georgia State Route 119 (Railroad Avenue). It travels to the north-northeast, through rural areas of Jasper and Hampton counties and has an intersection with U.S. Route 321 (Columbia Highway) in Garnett.

== Major intersections ==
County	Location	mi	km	Destinations	Notes
Jasper		0.000	0.000	SR 119 south (Railroad Avenue) – Clyo	Continuation into Georgia
Hampton	Garnett	5.990	9.640	US 321 (Columbia Highway) – Tillman, Savannah, Estill	Northern terminus
1.000 mi = 1.609 km; 1.000 km = 0.621 mi
