= Werkheiser =

Werkheiser is a surname. Notable people with the surname include:

- Bill Werkheiser (born 1960), American politician
- Devon Werkheiser (born 1991), American actor, voice actor, singer-songwriter, and musician
