= Georgia State Route 119 =

State highway in Georgia

State Route 119
- Georgia State Route 119 highlighted in red

Route information
- Maintained by GDOT
- Length: 81.2 mi (130.7 km)
- Tourist routes: Historic Effingham–Ebenezer Scenic Byway

Major junctions
- South end: US 17 / SR 25 in Riceboro
- US 84 / SR 38 in Walthourville; US 280 / SR 30 / SR 67 in Pembroke; I-16 near Blitchton; US 80 / SR 26 northwest of Blitchton
- North end: SC 119 near Clyo

Location
- Country: United States
- State: Georgia
- Counties: Liberty, Bryan, Bulloch, Effingham

Highway system
- Georgia State Highway System; Interstate; US; State; Special
← SR 118	→ SR 120

State Route 119 (SR 119) is an 81.2-mile-long (130.7 km) state highway that runs south-to-north in the east-central part of the U.S. state of Georgia. It runs from Riceboro to the Hinesville – Fort Stewart metropolitan area and curves to the northeast, through Pembroke and Springfield, and enters South Carolina north of Clyo, where the roadway continues as South Carolina Highway 119.

== Route description ==
SR 119 begins at an intersection with US 17/SR 25 (Ocean Highway) in Riceboro, in Liberty County. It heads west to Walthourville, where it intersects US 84/SR 38 (Oglethorpe Highway). The highway goes northward, past the Liberty County Airport and Savannah Technical College – Liberty Campus, to Hinesville. There, it intersects SR 196 (Elma G. Miles Parkway). The two routes head concurrent to the northeast through town. At General Screven Way, SR 119 splits off to the northwest, while SR 196 heads southeast. Just before SR 119 crosses the southern border of Fort Stewart, it meets the eastern terminus of SR 38 Connector (General Stewart Way). Less than 2 miles (3.2 km) later, it intersects SR 144. The two routes have a brief concurrency to the north-northwest. The roadway curves to the northeast to cross over the Canoochee River, which marks the Liberty–Bryan county line. A short distance later, the route crosses the northern border of Fort Stewart. North of the fort, SR 119 intersects US 280/SR 30/SR 67 (Bacon Street) in the town of Pembroke. At this intersection, SR 67 heads north, concurrent with SR 119. It departs to the northeast on Camelia Drive. It continues to the northeast, enters Bulloch County, and has an interchange with Interstate 16 (I-16). Immediately after is an intersection with the eastern terminus of SR 46. Little over 1 mile (1.6 km) later, it has a very brief concurrency with US 80/SR 26, before continuing its northeastern routing. It heads northwest less than 2 miles (3.2 km), and then intersects SR 119 Connector and travels northeast again. It crosses over the Ogeechee River, which marks the Bulloch–Effingham county line. Northeast, in the town of Guyton, is SR 17 (Central Boulevard). Farther to the northeast is Springfield. In Springfield, SR 119 intersects SR 21. Then, it turns left onto Laurel Street. It curves to the northeast, intersecting SR 21 Spur. SR 119 gradually curves to the north, passes through the town of Clyo, and meets its northern terminus, the South Carolina state line at the Savannah River. There, the roadway continues into South Carolina as South Carolina Highway 119.

The only section of SR 119 that is part of the National Highway System, a system of roadways important to the nation's economy, defense, and mobility, is the section from SR 38 Connector, in Hinesville to US 280/SR 30/SR 67 in Pembroke.

== Major intersections ==
County	Location	mi	km	Destinations	Notes
Liberty	Riceboro	0.0	0.0	US 17 / SR 25 (Ocean Highway)	Southern terminus
Liberty	Walthourville	12.5	20.1	US 84 / SR 38 (Oglethorpe Highway) – Ludowici, Hinesville	
Liberty	Hinesville	15.7	25.3	SR 196 west (Elma G. Miles Parkway) – Glennville	Southern end of SR 196 concurrency
Liberty	Hinesville	19.3	31.1	SR 196 east (General Screven Way) – Midway	Northern end of SR 196 concurrency
Liberty	Hinesville	20.2	32.5	SR 38 Conn. east (General Stewart Way) – Flemington	Western terminus of SR 38 Conn.
Liberty	Fort Stewart	23.1	37.2	SR 144 east – Richmond Hill	Southern end of SR 144 concurrency
Liberty	Fort Stewart	23.9	38.5	SR 144 west – Glennville	Northern end of SR 144 concurrency
Canoochee River		35.6	57.3	Unnamed bridge; crossing over the Canoochee River, marking the Liberty–Bryan county line	
Bryan	Pembroke	41.4	66.6	US 280 / SR 30 / SR 67 south (Bacon Street)	Southern end of SR 67 concurrency
Bryan	Pembroke	41.7	67.1	SR 67 north (North Main Street) – Statesboro	Northern end of SR 67 concurrency
Bulloch		49.4	79.5	I-16 (Jim Gillis Historic Savannah Parkway / SR 404) – Macon, Savannah	I-16 exit 137
Bulloch		49.7	80.0	SR 46 west – Denmark	Eastern terminus of SR 46
Bulloch		51.4	82.7	US 80 east / SR 26 east	Southern end of US 80/SR 26 concurrency
Bulloch		51.6	83.0	US 80 west / SR 26 west	Northern end of US 80/SR 26 concurrency
Bulloch	Ivanhoe	57.4	92.4	SR 119 Conn. north – Stilson	Southern terminus of SR 119 Conn.
Bulloch	Ivanhoe	57.6	92.7	SR 119 Spur north	Eastern terminus of SR 119 Spur
Ogeechee River		59.3	95.4	Unnamed bridge; crossing over the Ogeechee River, marking the Bulloch–Effingham county line	
Effingham	Guyton	63.6	102.4	SR 17 (Central Boulevard) – Bloomingdale, Oliver	
Effingham	Springfield	68.6	110.4	SR 21 – Rincon, Sylvania	
Effingham	Springfield	69.6	112.0	SR 21 Spur west	Eastern terminus of SR 21 Spur
Savannah River		81.2	130.7	Northern terminus at the South Carolina state line; roadway continues into South Carolina as SC 119.	
1.000 mi = 1.609 km; 1.000 km = 0.621 mi: Concurrency terminus

== Special routes ==
=== Connector route ===
State Route 119 Connector
- Location: Southeastern Bulloch County
- Length: 6.0 mi (9.7 km)

State Route 119 Connector (SR 119 Conn.) is a 6.0-mile-long (9.7 km) connector route that exists entirely within the southeastern part of Bulloch County.

SR 119 Conn. begins at an intersection with the SR 119 mainline (Ivan Ho Drive), southeast of Guyton and the Ogeechee River. The highway heads north-northwest and curves to the northwest, until it enters Stilson. In town, the road curves to the west-southwest until it meets its northern terminus, an intersection with US 80/SR 26, just outside town.

SR 119 Conn. is not part of the National Highway System, a system of roadways important to the nation's economy, defense, and mobility.

The entire route is in Bulloch County.

Location	mi	km	Destinations	Notes
Ivanhoe	0.0	0.0	SR 119 (Ivan Ho Drive) – Pembroke, Guyton	Southern terminus
	6.0	9.7	US 80 / SR 26	Northern terminus
1.000 mi = 1.609 km; 1.000 km = 0.621 mi

=== Spur route ===
State Route 119 Spur
- Location: Southeastern Bulloch County
- Length: 0.2 mi (320 m)

State Route 119 Spur (SR 119 Spur) is a 0.2-mile-long (0.32 km) Spur route that exists entirely within the southeastern part of Bulloch County.

SR 119 Spur begins at an intersection with the SR 119 mainline (Ivan Ho Drive), southeast of Guyton and the Ogeechee River. The highway curves to the northwest until it meets its northern terminus, an intersection with SR 119 Connector, a brief distance later.

SR 119 Spur is not part of the National Highway System, a system of roadways important to the nation's economy, defense, and mobility.

The entire route is in Ivanhoe, Bulloch County.

mi	km	Destinations	Notes
0.0	0.0	SR 119 (Ivan Ho Drive) – Pembroke, Guyton	Southern terminus
0.2	0.32	SR 119 Conn. – Stilson	Northern terminus
1.000 mi = 1.609 km; 1.000 km = 0.621 mi
