= JaKeenan Gant =

American basketball player (born 1996)

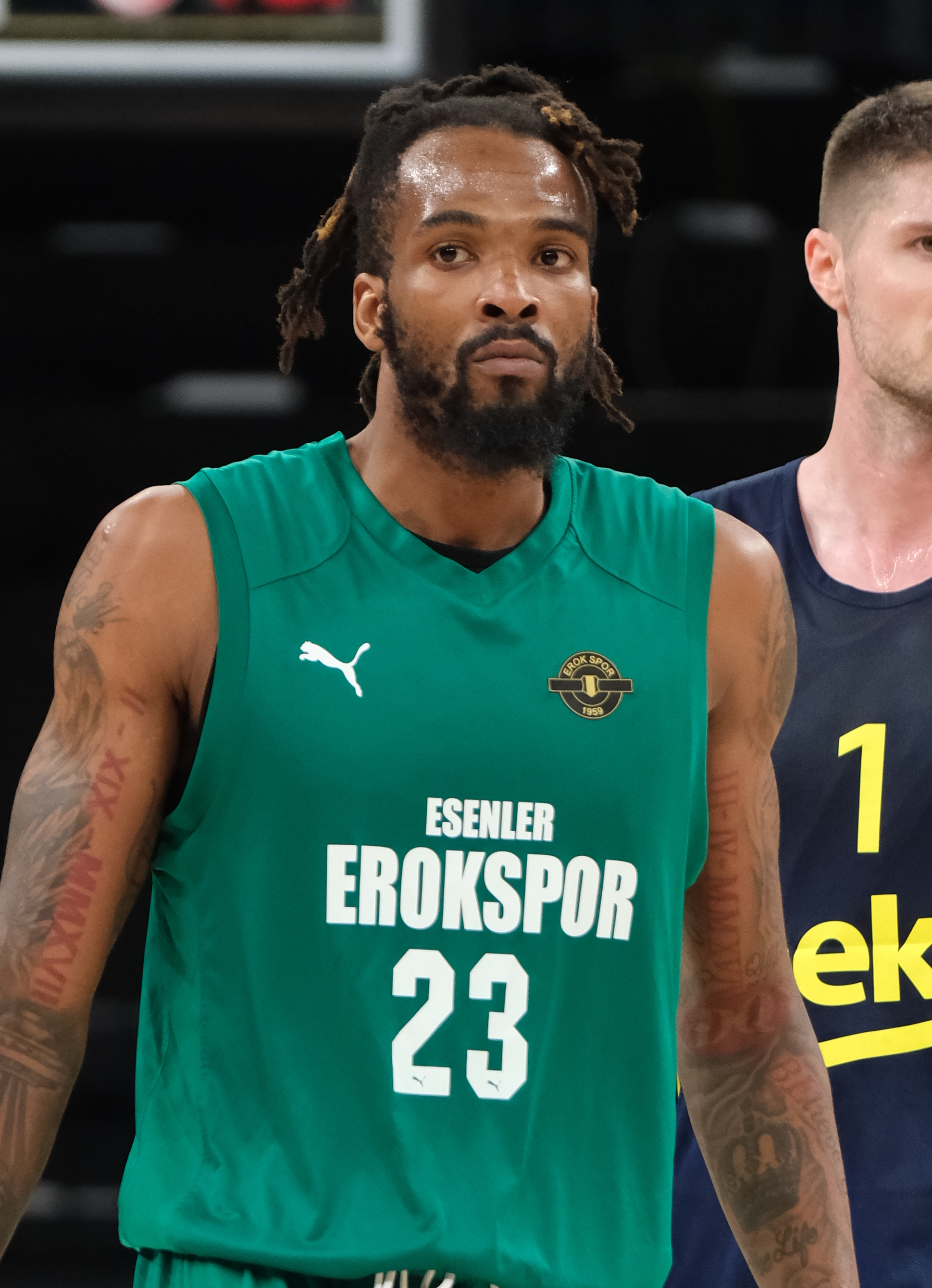
- Gant with Esenler Erokspor in 2025

No. 23 – Doxa Lefkadas
- Position: Power forward
- League: GBL

Personal information
- Born: May 6, 1996 (age 30) Savannah, Georgia, U.S.
- Listed height: 6 ft 8 in (2.03 m)
- Listed weight: 216 lb (98 kg)

Career information
- High school: Effingham County (Springfield, Georgia)
- College: Missouri (2014–2016); Louisiana (2017–2019)
- NBA draft: 2019: undrafted
- Playing career: 2019–present

Career history
- 2019–2020: Fort Wayne Mad Ants
- 2020: Mobis Phoebus
- 2021: Fort Wayne Mad Ants
- 2021: Saskatchewan Rattlers
- 2021–2023: Chorale Roanne Basket
- 2023: Ottawa BlackJacks
- 2023–2024: Hapoel Be'er Sheva
- 2024: Ottawa BlackJacks
- 2024: Nizhny Novgorod
- 2024–2025: Hapoel Haifa
- 2025–2026: Esenler Erokspor
- 2026–present: Doxa Lefkadas

Career highlights
- 2× Sun Belt Defensive Player of the Year (2018, 2019); First-team All-Sun Belt (2019); Third-team All-Sun Belt (2018); Sun Belt Newcomer of the Year (2018); Mr. Georgia Basketball (2014)
- Stats at Basketball Reference

JaKeenan Tyelle Gant (born May 6, 1996) is an American professional basketball player for Doxa Lefkadas of the GBL. He played college basketball for the Missouri Tigers and the Louisiana Ragin' Cajuns.

== Early life ==
Gant was born in Savannah, Georgia and grew up in the nearby city of Springfield, where he attended Effingham County High School. Gant averaged 17.9 points, 9.3 rebounds and 4.2 blocks per game in his junior season and was named the Region 3-5A and Georgia Class 5A Player of the Year as the Rebels reached the GHSA state semifinals. He averaged 21 points, 10.5 rebounds, four blocks, 2.8 assists and one steal per game as a senior and was again named 5A Player of the Year as well as Mr. Georgia Basketball. Rated a consensus four-star recruit, Gant was ranked as one of the top 60 college prospects in his class and in the top ten at his position. He committed to played college basketball at Missouri going into his senior year over offers from Alabama, Georgia, Florida, Louisville, and Indiana.

== College career ==
=== Missouri ===
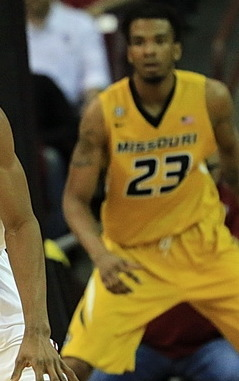
Gant with Missouri in 2016

Gant played in 23 games (six starts) as a freshman, averaging 4.9 points and 2.2 rebounds per game and shot 51.6 percent on field goal attempts. He missed nine games due to a suspension after he and fellow freshman Tiger D'Angelo Allen were arrested on suspicion of third-degree assault. As a sophomore Gant averaged 5.1 points and 3.8 rebounds per game, again primarily off the bench. Gant was suspended a second time by the team in February after he and teammate Russell Woods were both cited for possession of drug paraphernalia. Following the season, Gant announced that he would be leaving the program in order to move closer to home after his mother was diagnosed with an undisclosed health issue.

=== Louisiana ===
Gant ultimately transferred to the University of Louisiana at Lafayette. After sitting out one year due to NCAA transfer rules, Gant immediately stepped in as a starter for the Ragin' Cajuns the following season and was named the Sun Belt Conference Newcomer of the Year, Defensive Player of the Year, and third team All-Conference after averaging 13.7 points, 5.8 rebounds and 2.3 blocks per game. As a redshirt senior, Gant garnered first team All-Sun Belt honors and was again named Defensive Player of the Year after averaging 20.5 points per game (third-highest in the conference) and leading the conference with 8.7 rebounds and 2.6 blocked shots.

== Professional career ==
=== Fort Wayne Mad Ants (2019–2020) ===
Gant worked out for several teams leading up to the 2019 NBA draft, but ultimately went unselected. Gant signed an Exhibit 10 contract with the Indiana Pacers on July 1, 2019. Gant was waived by the Pacers on October 9, 2019. After being waived, Gant joined the Pacers' NBA G League affiliate, the Fort Wayne Mad Ants. In his first professional season, Gant averaged 8.0 points, 3.7 rebounds and 1.1 blocks per game.

=== Ulsan Mobis Phoebus (2020) ===
On June 16, 2020, Gant signed with Ulsan Mobis Phoebus of the Korean Basketball League. In 25 games, he averaged 9.4 points, 4.0 rebounds and 0.8 blocks in 12.9 minutes.

=== Second stint with Fort Wayne (2021) ===
On January 11, 2021, Gant returned to the Fort Wayne Mad Ants. In 3 games, he averaged 2.3 points, 0.3 rebounds and 0.3 assists in 5.2 minutes.

=== Saskatchewan Rattlers (2021) ===
On May 12, 2021, Gant signed with the Saskatchewan Rattlers of the Canadian Elite Basketball League.

=== Chorale Roanne Basket (2021–2023) ===
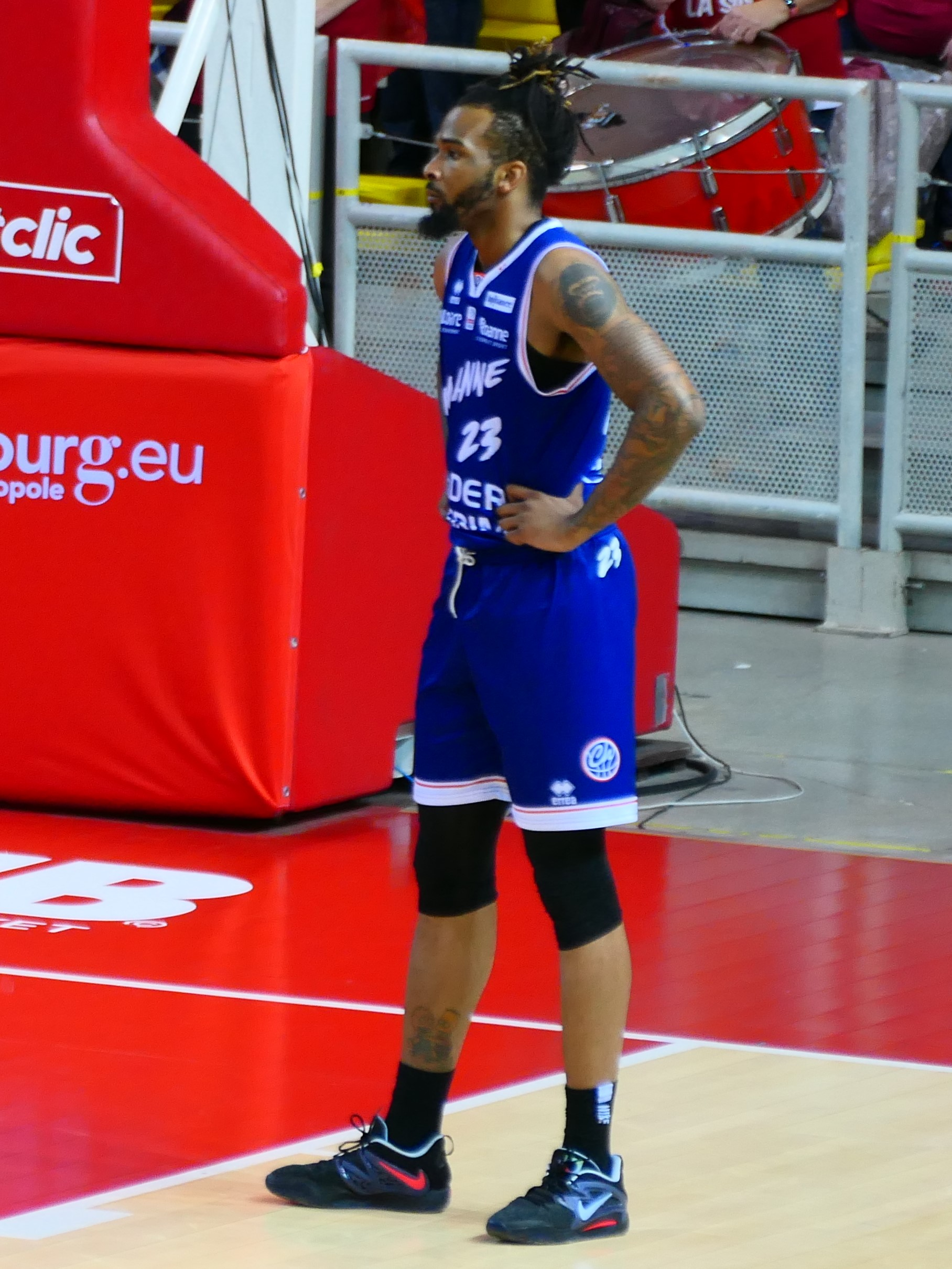
Gant with Chorale Roanne Basket in 2023

On July 9, 2021, Gant signed with Chorale Roanne Basket of the LNB Pro A.

=== Ottawa BlackJacks (2023) ===
Gant joined the Ottawa BlackJacks of the CEBL as a mid-season addition on June 30, 2023.

=== Hapoel Be'er Sheva (2023–2024) ===
On July 16, 2023, Gant signed with Hapoel Be'er Sheva of the Israeli Basketball Premier League.

=== Esenler Erokspor (2025–2026) ===
On July 14, 2025, he signed with Esenler Erokspor of the Basketbol Süper Ligi (BSL).
