= Reiser-Zoller Farm =

Historic house in Georgia, United States

- U.S. National Register of Historic Places
- U.S. Historic district
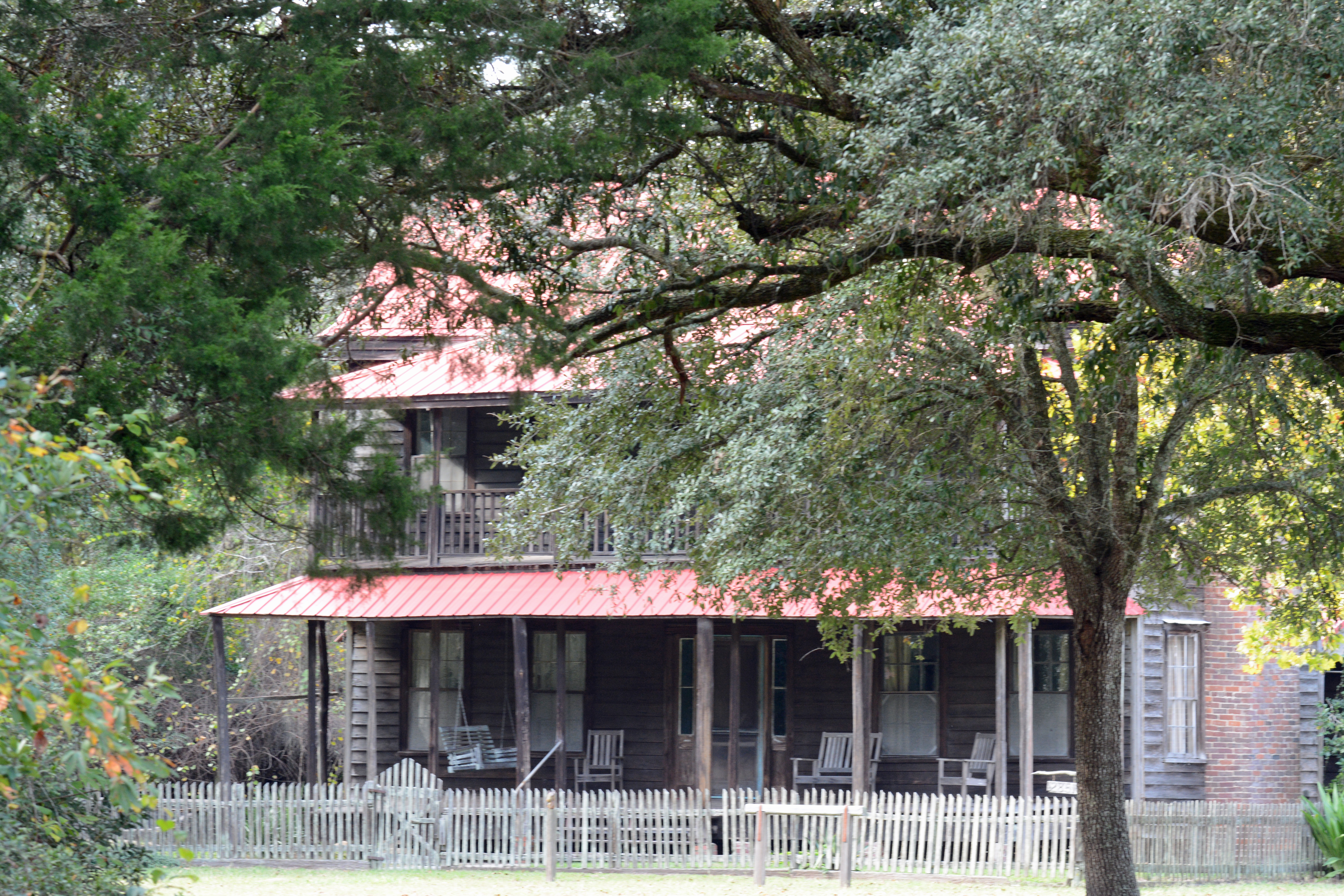

- Location within Georgia Location within the United States
- Nearest city: Springfield, Georgia
- Coordinates: 32.41158°N 81.28063°W
- Area: 100 acres (40 ha)
- Built: 1875
- Built by: Edwards, Pierce
- NRHP reference No.: 89000152
- Added to NRHP: March 2, 1989

The Reiser-Zoller Farm was listed on the National Register of Historic Places in 1989. The farm has a farmhouse complex consisting of a two-story plantation-plain style building with a two-story front porch built in 1900, linked to an original one-story farmhouse built in 1875. It has about a dozen outbuildings including three barns.
