= Egypt, Georgia, U.S. =

Human settlement in United States

Coordinates: 32°27′43″N 81°28′26″W

Egypt is an unincorporated community in Effingham County, in the U.S. state of Georgia.

== History ==
A post office called Egypt was established in 1850, and remained in operation until 1956. The community was named after Egypt, alluding to that country's fertile soil.
