= Georgia State Route 196 =

State highway in Georgia, United States

State Route 196
- Georgia State Route 196 highlighted in red

Route information
- Maintained by GDOT
- Length: 39.2 mi (63.1 km)

Major junctions
- West end: US 25 / US 301 / SR 23 / SR 57 southwest of Glennville
- US 84 / SR 38 / SR 119 in Hinesville; US 84 / SR 38 northwest of Midway
- East end: US 17 / SR 25 southwest of Richmond Hill

Location
- Country: United States
- State: Georgia
- Counties: Tattnall, Long, Liberty

Highway system
- Georgia State Highway System; Interstate; US; State; Special
← SR 195	→ SR 197

State Route 196 (SR 196) is a 39.2-mile-long (63.1 km) state highway in the eastern part of the U.S. state of Georgia. Its routing is located within portions of Tattnall, Long, and Liberty counties. It connects the Glennville and Hinesville areas.

== Route description ==
SR 196 begins at an intersection with US 23/US 301/SR 23/SR 57 southwest of Glennville. The highway heads southeast and enters Long County. SR 196 heads eastward, traveling through rural areas of the county, before gradually heading southeast once again. Just after entering Liberty County, it turns first to the southeast and then to the northeast until it enters Hinesville. Just after it enters town, it meets SR 119 and runs concurrent with SR 119 into Hinesville, where it departs to the northwest, to enter Fort Stewart. In the main part of the town, the highway intersects US 84/SR 38. Those two highways run concurrent with SR 196 northeast to Flemington, and heads to the southeast for about 2 miles (3.2 km), until SR 196 departs to the northeast. It continues heading northeast until it meets its eastern terminus, an intersection with US 17/SR 25 southwest of Richmond Hill.

== Major intersections ==
County	Location	mi	km	Destinations	Notes
Tattnall		0.0	0.0	US 25 / US 301 / SR 23 / SR 57	Western terminus
Long	No major junctions				
Liberty	Hinesville	20.4	32.8	SR 119 south (Airport Road) – Walthourville	Western end of SR 119 concurrency
Liberty	Hinesville	24.0	38.6	SR 119 north (West General Screven Way) – Fort Stewart	Eastern end of SR 119 concurrency
Liberty	Hinesville	24.4	39.3	US 84 west (West Oglethorpe Highway) / SR 38 west – Ludowici	Western end of US 84/SR 38 concurrency
Liberty	Hinesville	25.9	41.7	SR 38 Conn. west (General Stewart Way)	Eastern terminus of SR 38 Connector
Liberty		30.5	49.1	US 84 east / SR 38 east (East Oglethorpe Highway)	Eastern end of US 84/SR 38
Liberty		39.2	63.1	US 17 / SR 25 (Ocean Highway)	Eastern terminus
1.000 mi = 1.609 km; 1.000 km = 0.621 mi: Concurrency terminus
