= Georgia's 157th House of Representatives district =

State district in Georgia, USA

Georgia's 157th State House of Representatives district
Representative
Bill Werkheiser; R–Glennville
- Demographics: 61.9% White; 26.9% Black; 9.0% Hispanic; 0.3% Asian
- Population: 53,761

District 157 elects one member of the Georgia House of Representatives. It contains the entirety of Evans County and Jeff Davis County, as well as parts of Appling County and Tattnall County.

== Members ==
- Ray Holland (until 2005)
- Jon G. Burns (2005–2013)
- Delvis Dutton (2013–2015)
- Bill Werkheiser (since 2015)
