= Dusty Zeigler =

American football player (born 1973)

No. 52, 61
- Positions: Center, guard

Personal information
- Born: September 27, 1973 (age 53); Savannah, Georgia, U.S.
- Listed height: 6 ft 5 in (1.96 m)
- Listed weight: 298 lb (135 kg)

Career information
- High school: Effingham County (Springfield, Georgia)
- College: Notre Dame
- NFL draft: 1996: 6th round, 202nd overall pick

Career history
- Buffalo Bills (1996–1999); New York Giants (2000–2002)

Career NFL statistics
- Games played: 80
- Games started: 78
- Fumble recoveries: 2
- Stats at Pro Football Reference

Curtis Dustin Zeigler (born September 27, 1973) is an American former professional football player who was an offensive lineman in the National Football League (NFL) for the Buffalo Bills and the New York Giants. He played college football for the Notre Dame Fighting Irish.

== Notre Dame ==
Dusty Zeigler played college football at the University of Notre Dame.

== Buffalo Bills ==
Zeigler was selected in the sixth round of the 1996 NFL draft by the Bills in 1996. He became their starting center as a sophomore in 1997, playing between left offensive guard Ruben Brown and right guard Corbin Lacina, replacing the 11-year incumbent Kent Hull. That was the final one in Marv Levy's term as head coach (6-10 won-lost record), replaced the following year by his defensive coordinator, Wade Phillips, who guided the Bills to playoff berths in 1998 and 1999. In 1998, when Zeigler started all 16 games, playing between Brown and Joe Panos, Buffalo finished in second place in the AFC East and lost a wild-card game to the Miami Dolphins. In 1999, Buffalo also finished in second place in the AFC east, but Zeigler was switched to right guard to make place for Jerry Ostroski as the center next to Brown. The Bills lost another wild-card game, this time to the Tennessee Titans.

== New York Giants ==
Zeigler became a New York Giant in 2000, where he also became the starting center, from 2000 to 2001, starting all 16 games during those two years. In 2000, the Giants won the NFC championship game of the 2000–01 NFL playoffs, but lost Super Bowl XXXV to the Baltimore Ravens with Kerry Collins as quarterback. In 2002, Zeigler started only 2 games, replaced by Chris Bober, and never played again.

== Post-football ==
Since retiring from football, Zeigler has become active in politics and was elected as a Republican to be the county commission chairman in Effingham County GA in 2008. In 2012, Zeigler became an offensive line coach for the Savannah Christian Raiders, a high school team competing in the Georgia High School Association (GHSA).

== See also ==
- History of the New York Giants (1994-present)
