= Delvis Dutton =

American politician

Member of the Georgia House of Representatives from the 166th district
- In office January 10, 2011 – January 14, 2013
- Preceded by: Terry E. Barnard
- Succeeded by: Ben Watson

Member of the Georgia House of Representatives from the 157th district
- In office January 14, 2013 – January 12, 2015
- Preceded by: Jon G. Burns
- Succeeded by: Bill Werkheiser

Personal details
- Party: Republican
- Spouse: Danielle Dutton (Divorced)
- Children: 2
- Occupation: Businessman, politician

Delvis W. Dutton is an American politician from the state of Georgia. A Republican, he is a former member of the Georgia House of Representatives, representing the 157th district from 2011 through 2015.

== Education ==
Dutton attended Georgia Southern University.

== Career ==
Dutton is a businessman. He once worked at UPS and in 2004, Dutton became the owner of General Pump and Well. In 2014, Dutton started All On News and later became the founder and Market Development Director of AllOnGeorgia.com.

On November 2, 2010, Dutton won the election and became a Republican member of Georgia House of Representatives for District 166. Dutton defeated Patrick Banks.

On November 6, 2012, Dutton won the election unopposed and served another term as a Republican member of Georgia House of Representatives for District 157.

In May 2014, Dutton ran unsuccessfully in the 2014 GOP primary for the United States House of Representatives in the Georgia's 12th congressional district, to challenge incumbent Democratic Representative John Barrow. He was defeated by Rick Allen with 53.99% of the votes. Dutton came in third place and received 14.39% of the votes. Dutton also unsuccessfully ran for state Senate in the 19th district in 2016 and for house district 157 in 2018.

In 2015 and until 2016, Dutton became a Regional Director of Convention of States Project.

== Personal life ==
Dutton was previously married to Danielle Dutton. They divorced in 2018 and have two children. They continue to live in Glennville, Georgia.

Following Dutton's arrest in 2021 stemming from complaints filed by a female, in July 2022 Dutton pleaded guilty to stalking and criminal trespass. He was sentenced to 24 months of probation and 40 hours of community service, as well as a mental health evaluation, fines, a no contact order with the victim, and a 180-day jail sentence that was suspended.

== See also ==
- 2014 United States House of Representatives elections in Georgia
