= Josh Reddick =

American baseball player (born 1987)

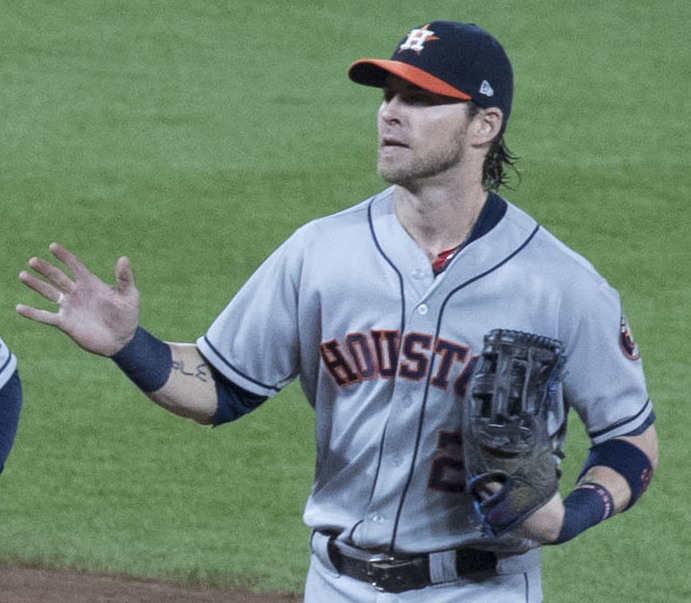
- Reddick with the Houston Astros in 2017
- Right fielder
- Born: February 19, 1987 (age 39); Savannah, Georgia, U.S.
- Batted: Left Threw: Right

MLB debut
- July 31, 2009, for the Boston Red Sox

Last MLB appearance
- August 3, 2021, for the Arizona Diamondbacks

MLB statistics
- Batting average: .262
- Home runs: 146
- Runs batted in: 575
- Stats at Baseball Reference

Teams
- Boston Red Sox (2009–2011); Oakland Athletics (2012–2016); Los Angeles Dodgers (2016); Houston Astros (2017–2020); Arizona Diamondbacks (2021)

Career highlights and awards
- World Series champion (2017); Gold Glove Award (2012)

William Joshua Reddick (born February 19, 1987) is an American former professional baseball outfielder. He played in Major League Baseball (MLB) for the Boston Red Sox, Oakland Athletics, Los Angeles Dodgers, Houston Astros and Arizona Diamondbacks. The Red Sox selected Reddick in the 17th round of the 2006 MLB draft, and he made his MLB debut in 2009. He won an American League (AL) Gold Glove Award in 2012.

== Amateur career ==
Reddick played for his school's team in middle school, but was cut from the team twice. He attended South Effingham High School in Guyton, Georgia. Previously a shortstop, Reddick transitioned to the outfield during his junior year of high school. He then attended Middle Georgia College, playing baseball in the NJCAA. As a freshman at Middle Georgia, Reddick hit .461.

== Professional career ==
=== Boston Red Sox ===
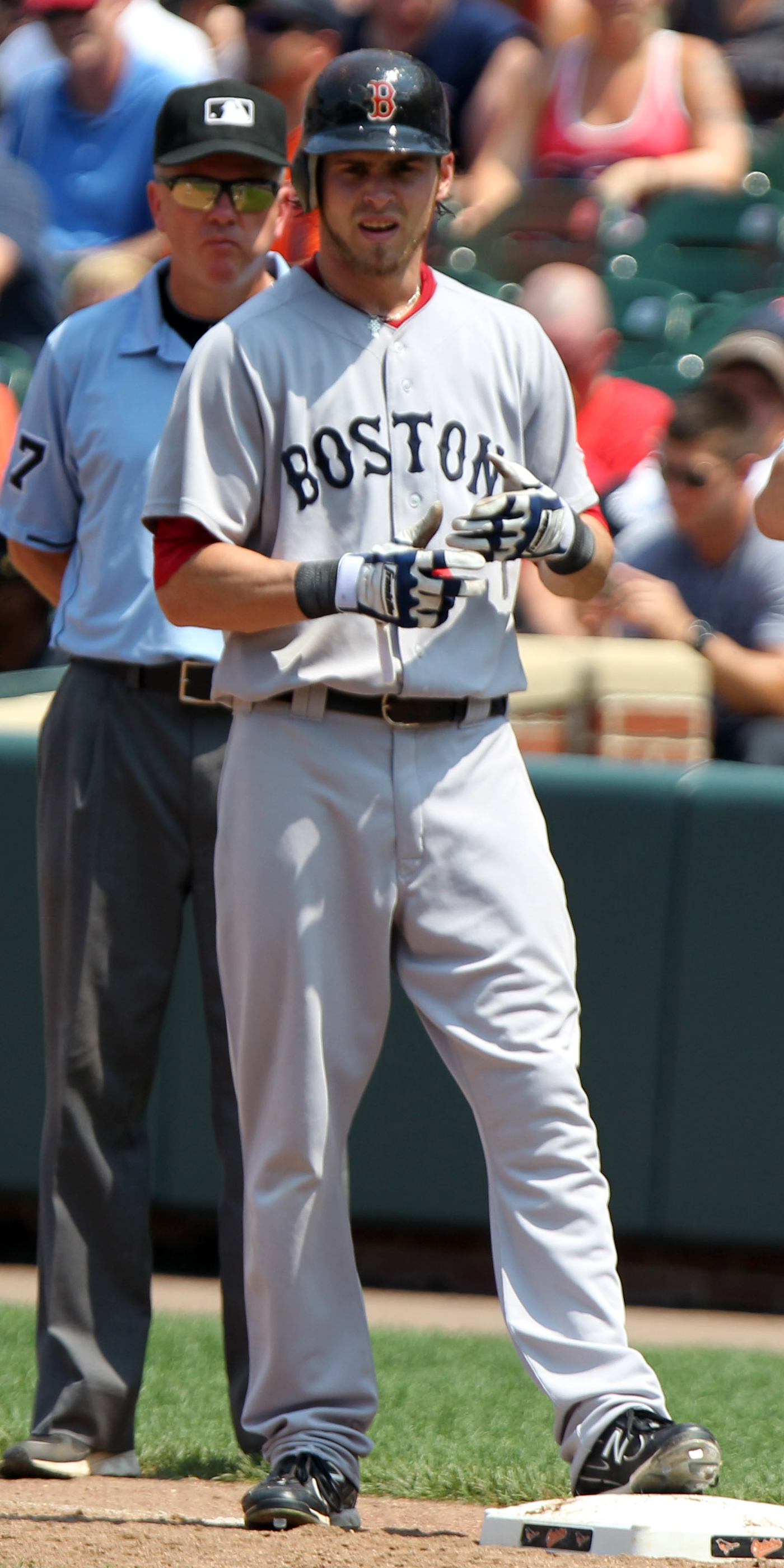
Reddick with the Boston Red Sox in 2011

The Boston Red Sox selected Reddick in the 17th round of the 2006 MLB draft.

On July 31, 2009, Reddick was called up to the major leagues to replace Adam LaRoche, who had been traded. He made his major league debut that night, pinch-hitting for Rocco Baldelli in the ninth inning and grounding out against Cla Meredith of the Baltimore Orioles in his only at-bat. He recorded his first MLB hit in the next game, a double in the second inning off of David Hernandez. He doubled again later in the game against Chris Ray for his first multi-hit major league game. On August 2, 2009, he hit his first major league home run against Brian Bass. Reddick was optioned back to the Triple A-Pawtucket Red Sox on August 5. The move allowed a depleted Red Sox bullpen to use Billy Traber's services. Reddick was recalled the next day when Rocco Baldelli was placed on the disabled list with a left ankle contusion.

Reddick started 2010 in Pawtucket but was recalled in April 2010 after Mike Cameron went on the DL. Reddick again started 2011 in Pawtucket but was recalled on May 26, 2011, after Darnell McDonald was placed on the 15-day disabled list with a strained left quad. He was able to stay in the majors after the Red Sox designated Cameron for assignment on June 29, 2011, effectively removing Cameron from the active and 40-man rosters, leaving room for Reddick.

=== Oakland Athletics ===
On December 28, 2011, the Red Sox traded Reddick and minor league players Raúl Alcántara and Miles Head to the Oakland Athletics for Andrew Bailey and Ryan Sweeney. Reddick finished 2012 with 32 home runs and 85 RBIs, both career highs, as he helped lead the A's to the American League West division title. He was named the American League right field Gold Glove Award winner on October 30, 2012.

Reddick began 2013 as the starting right fielder. On May 7, he was placed on the disabled list with a sprained right wrist, and was activated on May 31. Through most of the 2013 season, Reddick failed to retain the power he had from the previous season. Through August 8, he had hit .203 with only five home runs on the season. But on August 9, 2013, Reddick hit 3 home runs in a single game for the first time in his career in a 14–6 rout against the Toronto Blue Jays. On the next day, he homered twice more against Toronto. The total of five home runs in two games tied the Major League record for most home runs in consecutive games. On August 26 Reddick was placed on the 15-day disabled list with an injured right wrist. He returned on September 11. From August 9 to the end of the season, Reddick hit .284/.357/.514 with 7 home runs and 19 RBI. In 114 total games, he hit .226/.307/.379 with 12 home runs and 56 RBI.

After the season, Reddick underwent arthroscopic surgery on his wrist, which caused him to miss 37 games on the disabled list. He arrived at spring training fully healthy in 2014. On February 15, 2014, Reddick and the Athletics agreed on a one-year $2.7 million deal, avoiding arbitration. Reddick announced that he would wear number 22 for the 2015 season so that Billy Butler could wear number 16. Reddick signed with the Athletics for $4.1 million in 2015, and $6.575 million in 2016, his last year before qualifying for free agency.

=== Los Angeles Dodgers ===
On August 1, 2016, the Athletics traded Reddick and Rich Hill to the Los Angeles Dodgers for Grant Holmes, Jharel Cotton, and Frankie Montas. After a slow start with the Dodgers, he wound up hitting .258 in 47 games for them, including two homers.

=== Houston Astros ===
The Houston Astros signed Reddick to a four-year deal worth $52 million on November 23, 2016. During the 2017 regular season, he appeared in 134 games for Houston, batting .314/.363/.484 with 13 home runs and 82 RBIs. He tied for the major league lead in sacrifice flies (12).

In Game 3 of the ALDS against the Red Sox, Reddick accidentally assisted Jackie Bradley Jr. in hitting a 3-run home run as his leaping attempt to catch the ball caused it to pop out of his glove and over the wall for a home run. The Astros ultimately lost the game 10–3. Reddick redeemed himself the next day in Game 4 however, as he hit an RBI single with 2 outs in the top of the 8th inning of a tie game off of Craig Kimbrel and helped the Astros defeat the Red Sox and move on to the ALCS. In Game 2 of the ALCS, Reddick made a leaping catch to rob Chase Headley of a home run in the third inning against the Yankees. In making the catch, Reddick put his right hand in front of the opening of his glove to make sure the ball didn't slip out again. The Astros went on to win the 2017 World Series, giving Reddick his first championship, amid a sign stealing scandal. Reddick was Houston's nominee for tha Heart & Hustle Award.

In April 2018, Reddick became the second Astro in franchise history to hit two grand slams in one calendar month, Jeff Bagwell having been the first to do it (in May 2001). Reddick hit his grand slams on April 3 in a 10–6 win against the Orioles and on April 21 in a 10–1 victory over the White Sox, both of which were multi-homer games for Reddick. In 2018, he batted .242/.318/.400.

In 2019, Reddick batted .275/.319/.409 with 14 home runs and 46 RBIs in 201 at bats. In 2020, he batted .245/.316/.378 with 4 home runs and 23 RBIs in 188 at bats.

=== Arizona Diamondbacks ===
On April 12, 2021, Reddick signed a minor league contract with the Arizona Diamondbacks organization. On May 20, Reddick was selected to the active roster.

On July 10, 2021, Reddick made his pitching debut in the team's 22–1 loss to the Los Angeles Dodgers. During the appearance, he surrendered an eighth-inning, two-run home run to Albert Pujols. On August 5, 2021, Reddick was designated for assignment by the Diamondbacks. On August 7, the Diamondbacks released Reddick.

=== New York Mets ===
On August 11, 2021, Reddick signed a minor league contract with the New York Mets. Reddick played in 11 games for the Triple-A Syracuse Mets, hitting .182 with 1 home run and 4 RBI's. On August 29, 2021, Reddick was released by the Mets.

=== Acereros de Monclova ===
On February 9, 2022, Reddick signed with the Acereros de Monclova of the Mexican League. He appeared in 28 games, batting .293/.407/.475 with 4 home runs and 13 RBIs. Reddick unexpectedly announced his retirement following a game against the Mariachis de Guadalajara on May 25, 2022.

=== Perth Heat ===
Despite Reddick's previous retirement announcement in May, he later signed for the Perth Heat in the Australian Baseball League in October 2022.

Reddick announced his second retirement on March 18, 2023.

== Personal life ==
Reddick and his wife Georgette married in 2019 and welcomed twin boys that year. They reside in Crosby, Texas.

== See also ==
- Houston Astros sign stealing scandal
