= Georgia's 159th House of Representatives district =

State district in Georgia, USA

Georgia's 159th State House of Representatives district
Representative
Jon G. Burns; R–Newington
- Demographics: 66.1% White; 28.5% Black; 2.7% Hispanic; 0.3% Asian
- Population: 55,314

District 159 elects one member of the Georgia House of Representatives. It contains the entirety of Screven County, as well as parts of Bulloch County and Effingham County.

== Members ==
- Jon G. Burns (since 2013)
