= Clyo, Georgia =

- Unincorporated community
- Location within Georgia
- Coordinates: 32°29′03″N 81°16′01″W
- Country: United States
- State: Georgia
- County: Effingham
- Elevation: 72 ft (22 m)
- Time zone: UTC-5 (Eastern (EST))
  - Summer (DST): UTC-4 (EDT)
- ZIP code: 31303
- Area code: 912
- GNIS feature ID: 312778

Clyo is an unincorporated community in Effingham County, Georgia, United States. The community is located along Georgia State Route 119, 8.1 miles (13.0 km) north-northeast of Springfield. Clyo has a post office with ZIP code 31303.

== History ==
"Tuckasee King", a former variant name of Clyo, served as Effingham County seat from 1784 until 1787. A post office called Clyo has been in operation since 1897. The community was named after Clio, the muse of history in Greek mythology.
