= Guyton Historic District =

Historic district in Georgia, United States

- U.S. National Register of Historic Places
- U.S. Historic district
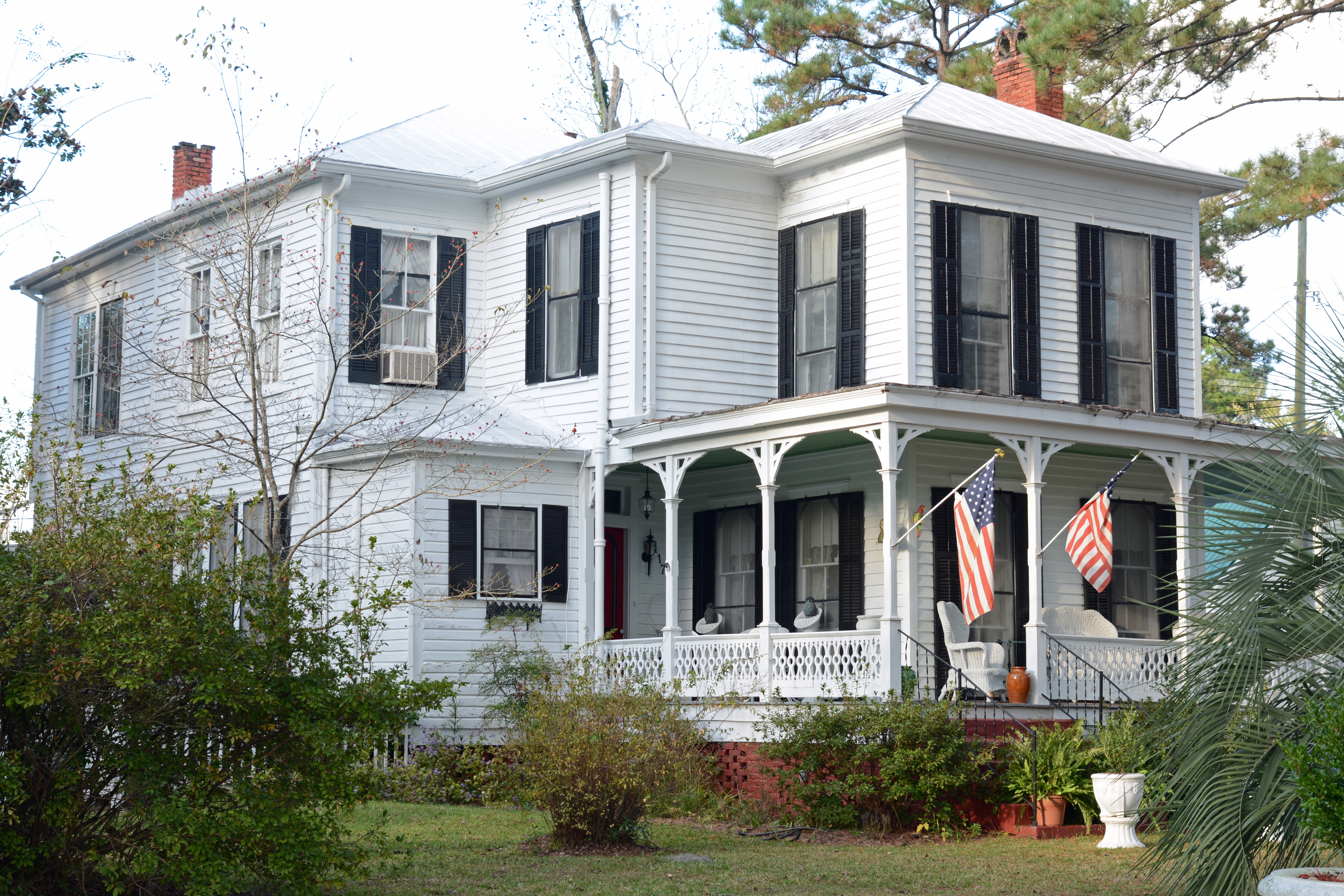

- Location within Georgia Location within the United States
- Location: Bounded by city limits on the E, S, and W, and Alexander Ave., on the N, Guyton, Georgia
- Coordinates: 32.335278°N 81.392778°W
- Area: 250 acres (100 ha)
- Architect: Multiple
- NRHP reference No.: 82002408
- Added to NRHP: September 30, 1982

The Guyton Historic District is a 250-acre (100 ha) historic district in the city of Guyton, Georgia. It is bounded by the city limits on the east, south, and west, and Alexander Ave. on the north, and it includes 136 contributing buildings and one other contributing structure.

It was listed on the National Register of Historic Places in 1982. It was deemed significant

as a relatively well preserved rural community that developed along the railroad tracks during the nineteenth and early twentieth centuries. Its founding and growth illustrate traditional locational and community planning theories. Because it was readily accessible to Savannah, it became an early example of a "bedroom community" for commuter businessmen and professionals. Its architecture reflects many of the prevailing design principles and construction practices of the nineteenth and early twentieth centuries.
