= South Effingham High School =

Location
- 1220 Noel C Conaway Road; Guyton, Effingham, Georgia 31312-6010; United States; 32.188068°N 81.315213°W

Information
- Motto: "One Band One Sound"
- Established: 1996
- School district: Effingham County School District
- Principal: Michael Ward
- Teaching staff: 117.80 FTE
- Grades: 9-12
- Enrollment: 1,900 (2023-2024)
- Average class size: 20-25
- Student to teacher ratio: 16.13
- Colors: Cardinal and silver White (alternate)
- Slogan: "And as always, live the Legend!"
- Fight song: "Mustang Fight Song!”
- Mascot: Mustang
- Nickname: SEHS
- Accreditation: none
- Telephone: (912) 728-7511
- Fax: (912) 728-7529
- Website: South Effingham High School

South Effingham High School is one of two public high schools located in Effingham County, Georgia, northwest of Savannah. The school was created in 1996 when Effingham County High School was split.

Marching Mustangs 2026-2027

The Marching Mustangs is one out of the two Marching Bands in Effingham County.

Josh Reddick was a starter for player for the Stangs baseball team before getting drafted by the Boston Red Sox in the 17th Round of the 2006 Major League Baseball draft.

== South Effingham Principals ==
- Franklin Goldwire (1996–2003)
- W. Lang Brannen (2003–2007)
- Charlie Bannister (interim) (2007)
- Dan Noel (2007–2009)
- Mark Winters (2009-2019)
- Torian White (2019–2026)
- Micheal Ward (2026–present)
