= Marcus Thornton (basketball, born 1992) =

American basketball player (born 1992)

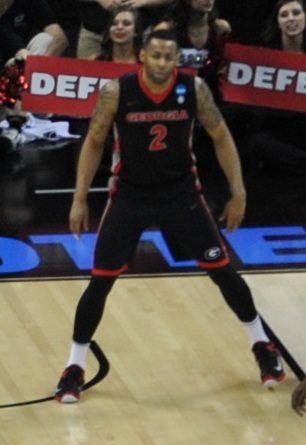
- Thornton playing for Georgia in 2015

Personal information
- Born: August 12, 1992 (age 34) Atlanta, Georgia, U.S.
- Listed height: 6 ft 8 in (2.03 m)
- Listed weight: 236 lb (107 kg)

Career information
- High school: Westlake (Atlanta, Georgia)
- College: Georgia (2010–2015)
- NBA draft: 2015: undrafted
- Playing career: 2015–2016
- Position: Small forward / power forward

Career history
- 2015–2016: Pistoia Basket 2000

Career highlights
- Fourth-team Parade All-American (2010); Mr. Georgia Basketball (2010)

Marcus Jelani Thornton (born August 12, 1992) is an American former professional basketball player. He played college basketball for the Georgia Bulldogs.

== Early life ==
Playing for Westlake High School (Fulton County, Georgia), Thornton averaged 24 points, 12 rebounds, 3.5 blocked shots, 3 assists & 1.5 steals per game during his senior season. For the totality of his high school career, he had over 1,000 rebounds and over 1,500 points. During his time at Westlake, the school made the state Class 5A championship final four for three consecutive years, reaching the final in 2010.

A 2010 Mr. Georgia Basketball selection by the Atlanta Tip Off Club (and The Atlanta Journal-Constitution) in 2010, he added Parade All-American Fourth Team, and ESPN RISE All-American honours.

== College career ==
Thornton originally committed to Clemson in November 2009 but when Oliver Purnell resigned in April 2010, he requested and was granted an unconditional release. Over interest from a number of programs, the Georgia native committed to Georgia, playing in the Southeastern Conference of the NCAA Division I, in May 2010.

During his freshman season he participated in 32 games, averaging 9.4 minutes with 1.5 points and 1.9 rebounds.

For his sophomore season, he started in 18 of the 25 games he played in during an injury impacted season, posting 3 points and 4.8 rebounds in more than 22 minutes per game.

He was granted a medical redshirt during what would have been his junior season after appearing in just nine games in 2012-13 before having arthroscopic knee surgery in December 2012.

For his full junior season the next year, he had 8.3 points, a team-high 6.1 rebounds and 1.3 blocks in 26 minutes per game as a starter.

In his senior season he led the Bulldogs in scoring & rebounding with respectively 12.3 and 7.3 in over 29 minutes per game. He scored nearly half of his career points during that season, with 7 of his 10 double-doubles, including one during his final college game in the 2015 NCAA Tournament loss against Michigan State.

== Professional career ==
In July 2015, Thornton signed his first professional contract, a one-year deal with Italian side Pistoia Basket 2000. On October 12, 2016, he parted ways with Pistoia.

== Personal life ==
In March 2017, Thornton began working as a commercial real estate broker with Atlanta-based T. Dallas Smith & Company.
