= Liberty County Airport (Georgia) =

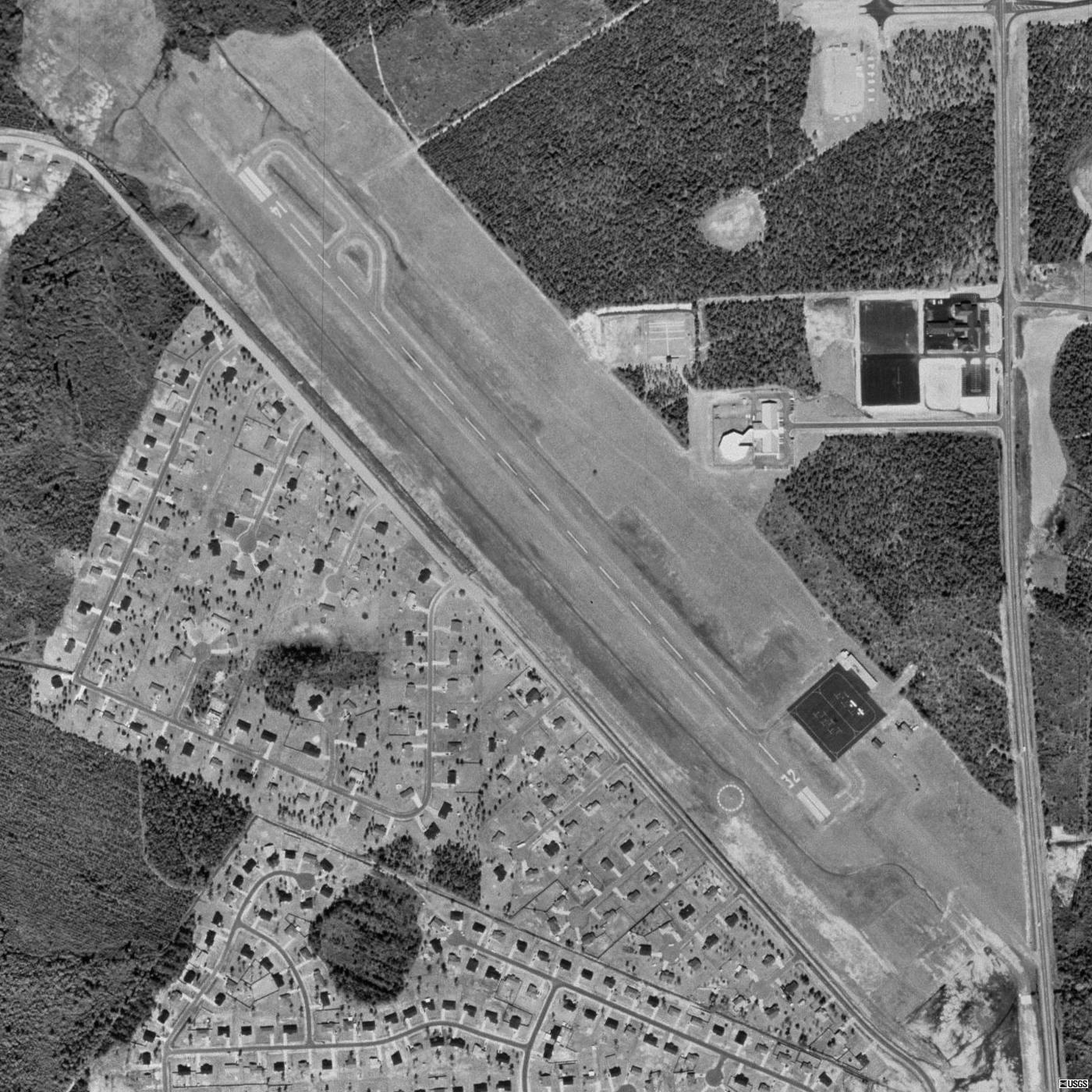
- USGS aerial image, 7 March 1999
- IATA: none; ICAO: none; FAA LID: 2J2

Summary
- Airport type: Closed
- Owner: Liberty County
- Serves: Liberty County, Georgia
- Location: Hinesville, Georgia
- Elevation AMSL: 98 ft / 30 m
- Coordinates: 31°47′05″N 081°38′28″W
- Interactive map of Liberty County Airport

Runways
| Direction | Length | | Surface |
| Direction | ft | m | Surface |
|---|---|---|---|
| 14/32 | 3,698 | 1,127 | Asphalt |

Statistics (2006)
- Aircraft operations: 4,000
- Source: Federal Aviation Administration

Liberty County Airport (FAA LID: 2J2) was a county-owned public-use airport in Liberty County, Georgia, United States. The airport was closed in 2008, when local civilian entities and the U.S. Army teamed up to open the joint use MidCoast Regional Airport at Wright Army Airfield.

== Facilities and aircraft ==
Liberty County Airport covered an area of 77 acres (31 ha) at an elevation of 98 feet (30 m) above mean sea level. The property has been transferred to the Liberty County School Board, which built the Liberty County College and Career Academy on the property.

For the 12-month period ending July 18, 2006, the airport had 4,000 general aviation aircraft operations, an average of 10 per day.

== See also ==
- MidCoast Regional Airport at Wright Army Airfield, a new general aviation facility which opened in November 2007 at Fort Stewart in Liberty County (31°53′21″N 081°33′44″W).
