= Paul Carrington (American football) =

American football player (born 1982)

No. 91, 96
- Position: Defensive end

Personal information
- Born: November 11, 1982 (age 43); Savannah, Georgia, U.S.
- Listed height: 6 ft 7 in (2.01 m)
- Listed weight: 250 lb (113 kg)

Career information
- High school: Springfield (GA) Effingham Co.
- College: UCF
- NFL draft: 2006: undrafted

Career history
- Atlanta Falcons (2006); Denver Broncos (2007); California Redwoods (2009)

Career NFL statistics
- Total tackles: 42
- Sacks: 3
- Forced fumbles: 1
- Stats at Pro Football Reference

Paul Carrington (born November 11, 1982) is an American former professional football player who was a defensive end in the National Football League (NFL). He played college football for the UCF Knights and was signed by the Atlanta Falcons as an undrafted free agent in 2006.

Carrington was also a member of the Denver Broncos and California Redwoods.

== Professional career ==
Pre-draft measurables
Height	Weight	40-yard dash	20-yard shuttle	Three-cone drill	Vertical jump	Broad jump	Bench press
6 ft 6 7/8 in (2.00 m)	267 lb (121 kg)	4.65 s	4.48 s	7.22 s	34.0 in (0.86 m)	10 ft 2 in (3.10 m)	21 reps
All values from Pro Day

=== Atlanta Falcons ===
After going undrafted in the 2006 NFL draft, Carrington signed with the Atlanta Falcons as an undrafted free agent. He appeared in 15 games (starting two) for the Falcons as a rookie, recording 37 tackles, three sacks and a forced fumble.

The Falcons waived Carrington during final cuts on September 1, 2007.

=== Denver Broncos ===
Carringon signed with the Denver Broncos on November 6, 2007, but was inactive for every game with the team that season. He was waived by the Broncos on August 30 and spent the rest of the season out of football.

=== California Redwoods ===
Carrington was signed by the California Redwoods of the United Football League on August 18, 2009.
