= Bill Werkheiser =

American politician from Georgia

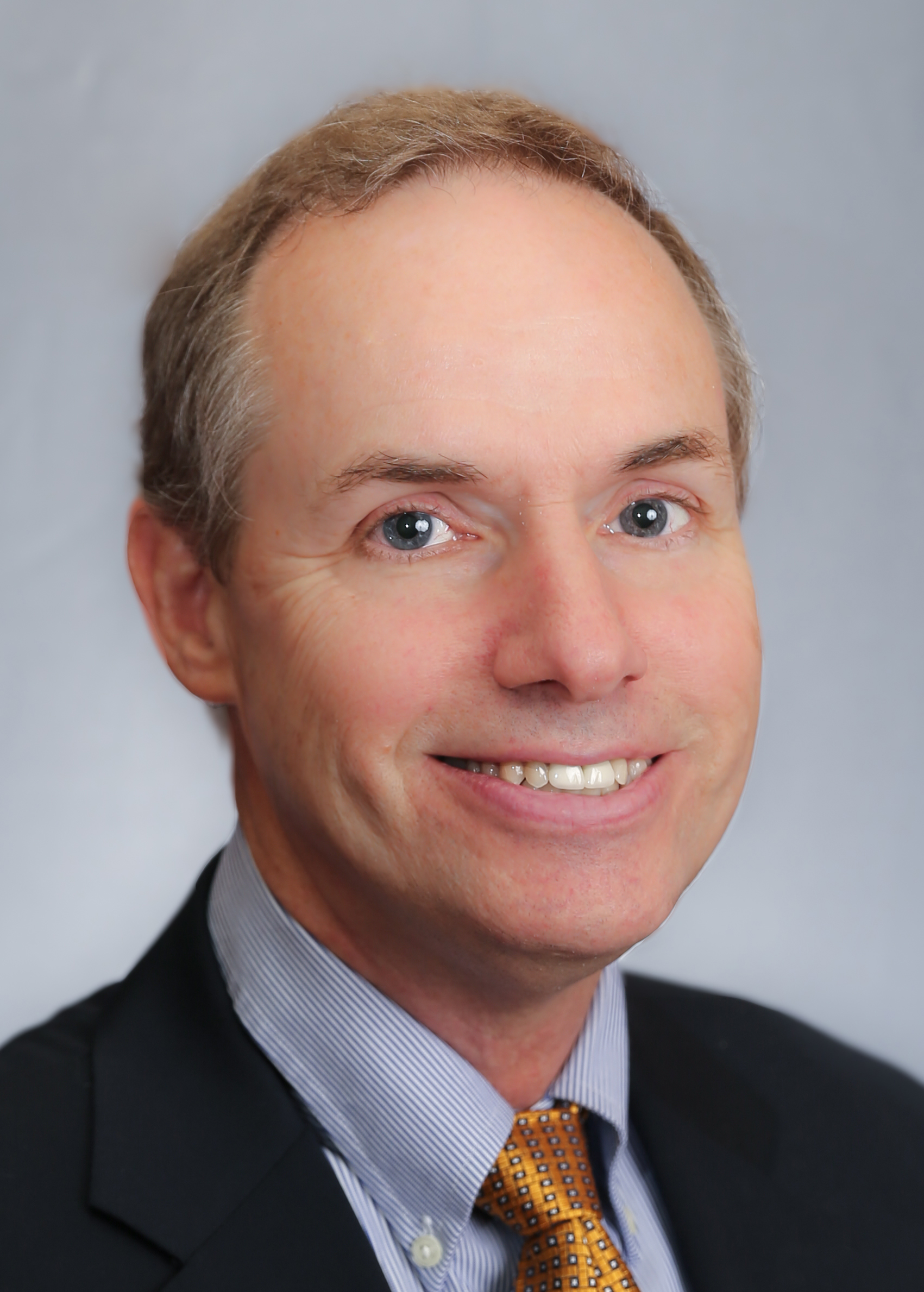
- Official portrait, 2025

Member of the Georgia House of Representatives from the 157th district
- Incumbent
- Assumed office January 12, 2015
- Preceded by: Delvis Dutton

Personal details
- Born: February 19, 1960 (age 66) Atlanta, Georgia, U.S.
- Party: Republican

William Werkheiser (born February 19, 1960) is an American politician, and a 1982 Cum Laud graduate of Georgia Southern University where he earned a Bachelor of Science degree in Technology. He was elected in 2014 to the Georgia House of Representatives for District 157, which consists of Tattnall, Jeff Davis, Evans and Wayne counties. Werkheiser has served in the Georgia House of Representatives from the 157th district since 2015. In the 2026 Georgia House of Representatives election, he lost the Republican primary to Bradley Anderson.
