= Ivanhoe, Georgia =

Unincorporated community in Georgia, U.S.

Coordinates: 32°17′03″N 81°28′38″W

Ivanhoe is an unincorporated community in Bulloch County, in the U.S. state of Georgia.

== History ==
A post office called Ivanhoe was established in 1877, and remained in operation until 1933. The community took its name from the 1820 novel Ivanhoe by Sir Walter Scott.
