= Springfield, Georgia =

Springfield
- City
- Logo
- Motto: "Where What's Close to Your Heart Still Matters"
- Location in Effingham County and the state of Georgia
- Coordinates: 32°22′6″N 81°18′37″W
- Country: United States
- State: Georgia
- County: Effingham

Government
  - Mayor: Barton Alderman

Area
  - Total: 3.25 sq mi (8.41 km^{2})
  - Land: 3.25 sq mi (8.41 km^{2})
  - Water: 0 sq mi (0.00 km^{2})
- Elevation: 79 ft (24 m)

Population (2020)
  - Total: 2,703
  - Density: 832.0/sq mi (321.22/km^{2})
- Time zone: UTC-5 (EST)
  - Summer (DST): UTC-4 (EDT)
- ZIP Code: 31329
- Area code: 912
- FIPS code: 13-72780
- GNIS feature ID: 0333107
- Website: City of Springfield Georgia

Springfield is a city in Effingham County, Georgia, United States. The population was 2,703 as of the 2020 census. The city is the county seat of Effingham County and a part of the Savannah metropolitan area.

== History ==
Springfield was established in 1799, and is most likely named after a plantation. The Georgia General Assembly incorporated Springfield in 1838.

== Geography ==
Springfield is located in the central Effingham County at 32°22′6″N 81°18′37″W (32.368240, -81.310152). Georgia State Route 21 bypasses the city center on the west, while Route 119 passes closer to the center of town. If navigated via GA, it is 26 miles (42 km) south to Savannah and 33 miles (53 km) northwest to Sylvania. While GA 119 leads southwest 5 miles (8 km) to Guyton and north 12 miles (19 km) to the South Carolina border.

According to the United States Census Bureau, Springfield has a total area of 2.7 square miles (7.1 km^{2}), all land.

== Demographics ==
Historical population
Census	Pop.	Note	%±
1870	32		—
1910	504		—
1920	377		−25.2%
1930	402		6.6%
1940	458		13.9%
1950	627		36.9%
1960	858		36.8%
1970	1,001		16.7%
1980	1,075		7.4%
1990	1,415		31.6%
2000	1,821		28.7%
2010	2,852		56.6%
2020	2,703		−5.2%
2023 (est.)	3,284	▲	21.5%
U.S. Decennial Census

=== 2020 census ===
As of the 2020 census, Springfield had a population of 2,703. The median age was 35.3 years. 24.3% of residents were under the age of 18 and 16.2% of residents were 65 years of age or older. For every 100 females there were 99.2 males, and for every 100 females age 18 and over there were 100.4 males age 18 and over.

0.0% of residents lived in urban areas, while 100.0% lived in rural areas.

There were 875 households in Springfield, of which 41.0% had children under the age of 18 living in them. Of all households, 45.3% were married-couple households, 16.5% were households with a male householder and no spouse or partner present, and 31.5% were households with a female householder and no spouse or partner present. About 25.6% of all households were made up of individuals and 13.3% had someone living alone who was 65 years of age or older.

There were 955 housing units, of which 8.4% were vacant. The homeowner vacancy rate was 4.7% and the rental vacancy rate was 4.9%.

Springfield racial composition as of 2020
Race	Num.	Perc.
White (non-Hispanic)	1,833	67.81%
Black or African American (non-Hispanic)	607	22.46%
Native American	7	0.26%
Asian	11	0.41%
Pacific Islander	3	0.11%
Other/Mixed	114	4.22%
Hispanic or Latino	128	4.74%

== Education ==
=== Effingham County School District ===
The Effingham County School District holds pre-school to grade twelve levels. It consists of eight elementary schools, three middle schools, and two high schools. The district has 511 full-time teachers and over 9,037 students.

- Blandford Elementary School
- Ebenezer Elementary School
- Guyton Elementary School
- Marlow Elementary School
- Rincon Elementary School
- Sand Hill Elementary School
- South Effingham Elementary School
- Springfield Elementary School
- Ebenezer Middle School
- Effingham County Middle School
- South Effingham Middle School
- Effingham County High School
- South Effingham High School

== Notable people ==
- Paul Carrington - professional football player
- JaKeenan Gant (born 1996) - basketball player
- Josh Reddick - professional baseball player
- Charlton W. Tebeau - historian
- Artie Ulmer - professional football player
- Dusty Zeigler - professional football player
