= Guyton, Georgia =

- City
- Seal Logo
- Motto: "Working Together to Make a Difference"
- Location in Effingham County and the state of Georgia
- Coordinates: 32°20′11″N 81°23′38″W
- Country: United States
- State: Georgia
- County: Effingham

Government
  - Mayor: Andy Harville
  - City Manager: Meketa Brown

Area
  - Total: 3.22 sq mi (8.34 km^{2})
  - Land: 3.21 sq mi (8.31 km^{2})
  - Water: 0.015 sq mi (0.04 km^{2})
- Elevation: 95 ft (29 m)

Population (2020)
  - Total: 2,289
  - Density: 713.8/sq mi (275.59/km^{2})
- Time zone: UTC-5 (Eastern (EST))
  - Summer (DST): UTC-4 (EDT)
- ZIP code: 31312
- Area code: 912
- FIPS code: 13-35884
- GNIS feature ID: 0356129
- Website: www.cityofguyton.com

Guyton is a city in Effingham County, Georgia, United States. The population was 2,289 at the 2020 census, up from 1,684 in 2010. Guyton is located 28 miles (45 km) northwest of downtown Savannah, and is part of the Savannah metropolitan statistical area.

== History ==
While some of the community's early settlers came from the Savannah area, it seems that most came from North and South Carolina. In 1792 a tract of 250 acres (1.0 km^{2}) of land in the form of a land warrant from Effingham County was issued to Squire Zachariah White. The community became known locally as "Whitesville". White was not married and left no heir when he died in 1838. He had granted a right-of-way to the new Central of Georgia Railway company prior to his death. White was buried on his own land, as was the custom. His grave is located at the rear of the present New Providence Church. Years later, controversy ensued when some members of the community tried to have Squire White's grave moved to the new local cemetery; the grave was never moved.

Shortly after White's death, the Effingham County Commissioners took over his land for unpaid taxes. They had a survey made, laid off various lots and streets just as they still appear today, and sold the land at public auction as payment of his taxes. Many lots were bought by affluent Savannah residents as a place for a summer home. At this time, an epidemic of yellow fever had struck Savannah.

The Central of Georgia Railroad Company, which had a charter to build and operate a railroad from Savannah to Macon and on to Marthasville (now Atlanta), laid track through Whitesville in 1837 or 1838, and referred to it as Station Number 30. After a short time, locals asked the railroad company to give the community a name so that residents could request that federal government place a post office here. Since there was already another town in Georgia called Whitesville, W. W. Gordon, president of the Central of Georgia, named the community "Guyton", after Archibald Guyton, a prominent local citizen. A U.S. post uffice was established at Guyton on December 31, 1851.

Guyton was an affluent town by the time of the American Civil War. During the war, the Confederacy built a hospital in Guyton. Some 26 Confederate soldiers are buried in the local cemetery. When General Sherman marched from Atlanta to Savannah on his burn-and-destroy mission, he came through Guyton with his main body of troops. It took five days for his army to pass through, with some of his troops looting, burning, and stealing. The depot and tracks were destroyed, which could explain why some records of this period are not complete.

In 1887, Guyton was incorporated and issued a town charter by the State of Georgia. The local member of the Georgia Legislature who had the bill introduced and passed was Colonel Clarance Guyton, a grandson of Archibald Guyton.

The Guyton City Hall has received many requests over the years for information about the Guyton family. However, little is known about their background. They were rumored to have immigrated from England to North Carolina. Archibald Guyton arrived to the area from North Carolina in 1825. He was married twice. His first wife was the widow Tondee of Savannah. There was a Tondee farm or plantation listed in Effingham County near Guyton during this period, so she may have had connections there. The Georgia census of 1850 shows Archibald came to Georgia in 1825. He was in the timber business. His first wife, widow Tondee died (fever) and is buried in the old Providence Baptist Cemetery. His second wife was Harriet Patterson, of this area. Archibald had a son, Robert, by his first wife and a son, Charles, by his second wife. There were several girls also as are listed in his cemetery plot. Archibald's grandson, Clarance, was an attorney and maintained a law office in Savannah. Everyone called him Colonel Guyton. He was a member of the Georgia Legislature and was very prominent.

There are no families named Guyton living in the community today. The last Guyton family home, which was occupied by Clarance, his sister Belle Hendry, and also his sister Tallullah and her husband Fred Seckinger is still in excellent condition. It is located on Highway 17, just north of the Guyton city limits.

Every December, the spirit of Christmas is highlighted in Guyton with an annual tour of homes. This community-sponsored event will usually host around three to four thousand visitors every year. Visitors will usually tour about a dozen homes, and nearly all of the churches are open for the tour. Many homes in the historic district will have lighted doors. The festivities usually begin with a country supper and tour of the historical city. As visitors drive down main street in Guyton, they can view the lighted trees that line the old railroad median for one-mile (1.6 km). The Guyton Volunteer Fire Department usually illuminates the nearly 7,000 lights each year on the Saturday following Thanksgiving.

Today, Guyton is still a small town, but one with much history. As visitors drive through its narrow lanes and streets, particularly in December of each year, they see a Georgia town nearly the same as it was a century ago.

== Geography ==
Guyton is located in west-central Effingham County at 32°20′11″N 81°23′38″W (32.336338, -81.393763). State Routes 17 and 119 cross in the southwest part of town. GA 17 leads northwest 15 miles (24 km) to Oliver and south 16 miles (26 km) to Bloomingdale, west of Savannah, while GA 119 leads northeast 5 miles (8 km) to Springfield, the Effingham County seat, and southwest 14 miles (23 km) to Interstate 16 in Bulloch County.

According to the United States Census Bureau, Guyton has a total area of 3.2 square miles (8.3 km^{2}), of which 0.02 square miles (0.04 km^{2}), or 0.48%, is water.

== Demographics ==
Historical population
Census	Pop.	Note	%±
1890	541		—
1900	500		−7.6%
1910	545		9.0%
1920	539		−1.1%
1930	583		8.2%
1940	549		−5.8%
1950	633		15.3%
1960	670		5.8%
1970	742		10.7%
1980	749		0.9%
1990	740		−1.2%
2000	917		23.9%
2010	1,684		83.6%
2020	2,289		35.9%
2023 (est.)	2,925	▲	27.8%
U.S. Decennial Census

=== 2020 census ===
As of the 2020 census, Guyton had a population of 2,289. The median age was 33.8 years. 29.0% of residents were under the age of 18 and 11.8% of residents were 65 years of age or older. For every 100 females there were 98.9 males, and for every 100 females age 18 and over there were 89.4 males age 18 and over.

0.0% of residents lived in urban areas, while 100.0% lived in rural areas.

There were 782 households in Guyton, of which 47.3% had children under the age of 18 living in them. Of all households, 54.2% were married-couple households, 12.5% were households with a male householder and no spouse or partner present, and 26.0% were households with a female householder and no spouse or partner present. About 15.9% of all households were made up of individuals and 5.5% had someone living alone who was 65 years of age or older.

There were 846 housing units, of which 7.6% were vacant. The homeowner vacancy rate was 2.3% and the rental vacancy rate was 7.8%.

Guyton racial composition as of 2020
Race	Num.	Perc.
White (non-Hispanic)	1,440	62.91%
Black or African American (non-Hispanic)	615	26.87%
Native American	8	0.35%
Asian	9	0.39%
Other/Mixed	124	5.42%
Hispanic or Latino	93	4.06%

There were 527 families residing in the city.
