= Effingham County, Georgia =

County in Georgia, United States

- County
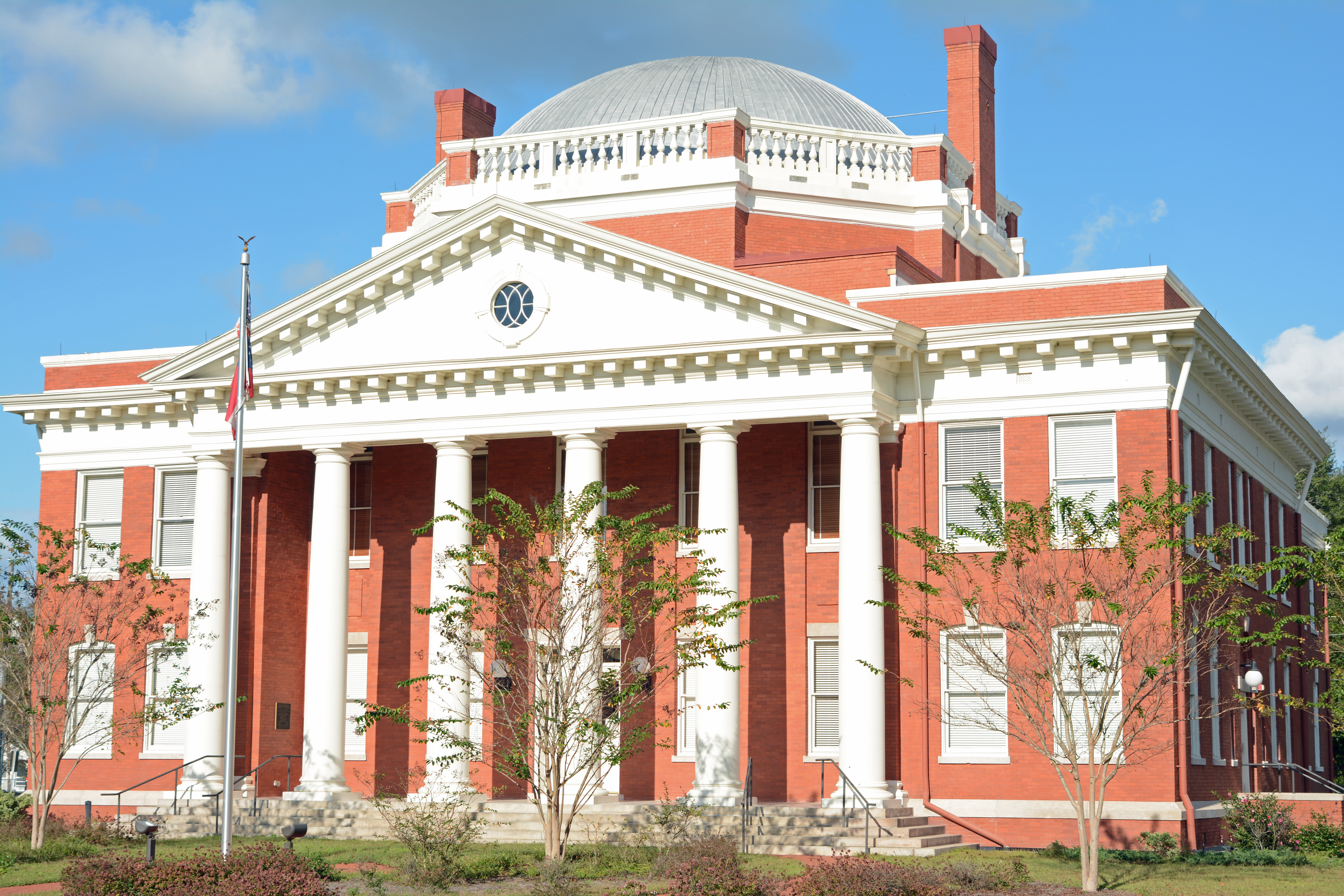
- Effingham County Courthouse in Springfield

- Logo

- Location within the U.S. state of Georgia
- Coordinates: 32°22′N 81°20′W
- Country: United States
- State: Georgia
- Founded: February 5, 1777; 249 years ago
- Named for: Thomas Howard, 3rd Earl of Effingham
- Seat: Springfield
- Largest city: Rincon

Area
  - Total: 483 sq mi (1,250 km^{2})
  - Land: 478 sq mi (1,240 km^{2})
  - Water: 5.2 sq mi (13 km^{2}) 1.1%

Population (2020)
  - Total: 64,769
  - Estimate (2025): 74,397 ▲
  - Density: 136/sq mi (53/km^{2})
- Time zone: UTC−5 (Eastern)
  - Summer (DST): UTC−4 (EDT)
- Congressional districts: 1st, 12th
- Website: www.effinghamcounty.org

Effingham County (/ˈɛfɪŋhæm/ EFF-ing-ham) is a county located in the southeastern part of the U.S. state of Georgia. As of the 2020 census, the population was 64,769. The seat is Springfield.

Effingham County is included in the Savannah metropolitan area.

In 2008, Effingham County was ranked as the sixth-fastest-growing midsize county in the nation from 2000 to 2007 by the U.S. Census Bureau. The county had a 35.1% growth rate over that period.

== History ==
Effingham was among the original counties of the state of Georgia, created February 5, 1777, during the American Revolution from the colonial parishes of St. Matthew and St. Phillip. Its name honors Lord Effingham, an English champion of colonial rights, who resigned his commission rather than fight against the rebel colonists during the American Revolution. During the war, most of the Loyalists in what is now Effingham County were first generation Scottish immigrants. After the war, notable Georgia patriots including Lyman Hall, Samuel Elbert, Edward Telfair, George Walton and Stephen Heard all made direct appeals to the Loyalists of Effingham County to "stay on" in Georgia, under the new republican form of government. In Effingham County, this effort was successful, and virtually all Loyalists in the county stayed. The town of Springfield was established in 1799, and most likely was named after a plantation.

== Geography ==
According to the U.S. Census Bureau, the county has a total area of 483 square miles (1,250 km^{2}), of which 478 square miles (1,240 km^{2}) is land and 5.2 square miles (13 km^{2}) (1.1%) is water.

The entire western edge of Effingham County, from south of Newington to east of Guyton, then south to southwest of Meldrim, is located in the Lower Ogeechee River sub-basin of the Ogeechee River basin. The bulk of the rest of the county is located in the Lower Savannah River sub-basin of the Savannah River basin. A narrow rectangular portion of south Effingham County, from south of Pineora through Meldrim, is located in the Ogeechee Coastal sub-basin of the Ogeechee River basin.

=== Adjacent counties ===
- Hampton County, South Carolina (north)
- Jasper County, South Carolina (northeast)
- Chatham County (southeast)
- Bryan County (south)
- Bulloch County (west)
- Screven County (northwest)

=== National protected area ===
- Savannah National Wildlife Refuge (part)

== Communities ==
=== Cities ===
- Guyton
- Rincon
- Springfield

=== Unincorporated communities ===
- Clyo
- Egypt
- Meldrim
- Shawnee

=== Ghost town ===
- Ebenezer

== Demographics ==
Historical population
| Census | Pop. | Note | %± |
|---|---|---|---|
| 1790 | 2,424 | | — |
| 1800 | 2,072 | | −14.5% |
| 1810 | 2,586 | | 24.8% |
| 1820 | 3,018 | | 16.7% |
| 1830 | 2,924 | | −3.1% |
| 1840 | 3,075 | | 5.2% |
| 1850 | 3,864 | | 25.7% |
| 1860 | 4,755 | | 23.1% |
| 1870 | 4,214 | | −11.4% |
| 1880 | 5,979 | | 41.9% |
| 1890 | 5,599 | | −6.4% |
| 1900 | 8,334 | | 48.8% |
| 1910 | 9,971 | | 19.6% |
| 1920 | 9,985 | | 0.1% |
| 1930 | 10,164 | | 1.8% |
| 1940 | 9,646 | | −5.1% |
| 1950 | 9,133 | | −5.3% |
| 1960 | 10,144 | | 11.1% |
| 1970 | 13,632 | | 34.4% |
| 1980 | 18,327 | | 34.4% |
| 1990 | 25,687 | | 40.2% |
| 2000 | 37,535 | | 46.1% |
| 2010 | 52,250 | | 39.2% |
| 2020 | 64,769 | | 24.0% |
| 2025 (est.) | 74,397 | ▲ | 14.9% |
U.S. Decennial Census; 1790-1880 1890-1910; 1920-1930 1930-1940; 1940-1950 1960-1980; 1980-2000 2010

=== Racial and ethnic composition ===
Effingham County, Georgia – Racial and ethnic composition Note: the US Census treats Hispanic/Latino as an ethnic category. This table excludes Latinos from the racial categories and assigns them to a separate category. Hispanics/Latinos may be of any race.
| Race / Ethnicity (NH = Non-Hispanic) | Pop 1980 | Pop 1990 | Pop 2000 | Pop 2010 | Pop 2020 | % 1980 | % 1990 | % 2000 | % 2010 | % 2020 |
|---|---|---|---|---|---|---|---|---|---|---|
| White alone (NH) | 14,778 | 21,794 | 31,493 | 42,311 | 48,204 | 80.64% | 84.84% | 83.90% | 80.98% | 74.42% |
| Black or African American alone (NH) | 3,365 | 3,601 | 4,853 | 6,982 | 8,747 | 18.36% | 14.02% | 12.93% | 13.36% | 13.50% |
| Native American or Alaska Native alone (NH) | 22 | 54 | 112 | 135 | 181 | 0.12% | 0.21% | 0.30% | 0.26% | 0.28% |
| Asian alone (NH) | 23 | 56 | 168 | 425 | 677 | 0.13% | 0.22% | 0.45% | 0.81% | 1.05% |
| Native Hawaiian or Pacific Islander alone (NH) | x | x | 9 | 16 | 28 | x | x | 0.02% | 0.03% | 0.04% |
| Other race alone (NH) | 5 | 13 | 30 | 66 | 269 | 0.03% | 0.05% | 0.08% | 0.13% | 0.42% |
| Mixed race or Multiracial (NH) | x | x | 339 | 814 | 3,171 | x | x | 0.90% | 1.56% | 4.90% |
| Hispanic or Latino (any race) | 134 | 169 | 531 | 1,501 | 3,492 | 0.73% | 0.66% | 1.41% | 2.87% | 5.39% |
| Total | 18,327 | 25,687 | 37,535 | 52,250 | 64,769 | 100.00% | 100.00% | 100.00% | 100.00% | 100.00% |

=== 2020 census ===
As of the 2020 census, there were 64,769 people, 22,892 households, and 15,424 families residing in the county.

The median age was 36.7 years; 27.0% of residents were under the age of 18 and 12.6% were 65 years of age or older. For every 100 females there were 97.4 males, and for every 100 females age 18 and over there were 94.8 males age 18 and over. 25.8% of residents lived in urban areas, while 74.2% lived in rural areas.

The racial makeup of the county was 75.9% White, 13.7% Black or African American, 0.4% American Indian and Alaska Native, 1.1% Asian, 0.1% Native Hawaiian and Pacific Islander, 2.1% from some other race, and 6.9% from two or more races. Hispanic or Latino residents of any race comprised 5.4% of the population.

There were 22,892 households in the county, of which 40.2% had children under the age of 18 living with them and 21.1% had a female householder with no spouse or partner present. About 18.7% of all households were made up of individuals and 7.3% had someone living alone who was 65 years of age or older.

There were 24,317 housing units, of which 5.9% were vacant. Among occupied housing units, 78.0% were owner-occupied and 22.0% were renter-occupied. The homeowner vacancy rate was 1.5% and the rental vacancy rate was 7.0%.

== Economy ==
In the early years of the 1900s, agriculture was the mainstay of the county economy. The chief agricultural products were Irish potatoes and sweet potatoes. The county farmers raised so many Irish potatoes in the early 1920s that they were shipped out numerous railroad boxcars, full of potatoes, during the summer months of those years.

Small businesses, such as the Effingham Canning Company and Potato Barrel manufacturing mills, became big businesses. The Effingham Canning Company did not last long. It was established in 1918 at the site of the former Savannah Atlanta Railroad Locomotive Repair Shop in Springfield. This site today would be located across the road from Georgia Highway Department Maintenance Building on Georgia Highway 21, south of Springfield. A later canning company operated in the 1940s at the old elementary school grounds in Springfield.

In the early 21st century, Effingham County has had unprecedented demand for industrial locations. Interest in industrial development has been spurred by the area's high population growth, tremendous growth at the Georgia ports and the ever-growing economy of coastal Georgia. Contributors include the military, aerospace industry and a diversified manufacturing base. The Savannah area is home to Gulfstream Aerospace and Hunter Army Airfield.

The Effingham County Industrial Park has announced several new tenants since 2005. In 2007 it became the site of EFACEC Group, a Portuguese-based transformer manufacturer for their North and Central America operations. The U.S. factory is located in Rincon, Georgia and produces both core and shell technology power transformers. Other businesses include the Flint River Services refrigerated storage, ValuePart distribution center, as well as expansions of several existing industries in the park. The site is ideally located on a four-lane divided highway only 10 miles (16 km) from Interstate 95 and within 15 miles (24 km) of the Georgia Ports, the Savannah International Airport and the historic City of Savannah.

The Effingham Industrial Development Authority acquired approximately 4,000 acres (16 km^{2}) for development. The acquisitions include a tract of approximately 200 acres (0.81 km^{2}) adjacent to Interstate 16 and an additional 1,550-acre (6.3 km^{2}) tract on Interstate 16 seven miles from Interstate 95. Both tracts are within 15 miles (24 km) of the Georgia Ports Authority, and within 10 miles (16 km) of the Chatham County Mega-Site (formerly known as the DaimlerChrysler site) at the strategic intersection of Interstates 95 and 16.

A potential of 10,000,000 square feet (930,000 m^{2}) of light manufacturing and/or Distribution Center/ Warehousing space exists at this site. Another recent acquisition is the former Research Forest Tract. Approximately 2,300 acres (9.3 km^{2}) in size, this will be a "legacy" development to include commercial, executive office, heavy industrial, light industrial, professional service, research and recreational land uses. The site comprises three separate tracts of land six rail miles from the Georgia Ports Authority, with planned access to the Savannah River Parkway, Norfolk Southern mainline rail and CSX mainline rail. The property is being master planned. The development is planned to attract research and development, assembly operations, headquarters and other low-impact operations.

Industry in Effingham County includes paper manufacturing—Georgia Pacific (Savannah River Mill), high-precision turbine blade production—Doncasters, aluminum geodesic dome production—Temcor, concrete pipe manufacturing—Hanson, customized business jet interiors—Edward's Interiors, electrical distribution power transformer production—EFACEC PT, among many others.

== Transportation ==
=== Major highways ===
- I-16 / SR 404 (unsigned)
- I-95 / SR 405 (unsigned)
- US 80 / SR 26
- SR 17
- SR 21
  - SR 21 Spur
- SR 30
- SR 119
- SR 275
- SR 565 (Savannah River Parkway)

=== Railroads ===
Effingham County contains three major railroad lines. Two of them are owned by CSX and the other is owned by Norfolk Southern. The Norfolk Southern Savannah District and CSX Columbia Subdivision runs nearly parallel to one another before crossing the Chatham County Line towards Savannah. A third line (the Charleston Subdivision) runs northeast from Port Wentworth to the South Carolina State Line, and spends even less time in the county than Interstate 95.

Amtrak runs three trains along the two CSX lines, neither of which stop anywhere within the county. The Silver Star (Amtrak train) runs along the Columbia Subdivision. The Palmetto and Silver Meteor trains run along the Charleston Subdivision, which has no stations, and no possible location for a station.

== Politics ==
As of the 2020s, Effingham County is a Republican stronghold, voting 74% for Donald Trump in 2024. Effingham County has been a reliably Republican county from 1984 onward. After supporting Dixiecrat Strom Thurmond in 1948, it began voting Republican earlier than most Georgia counties, albeit by very narrow margins. Effingham then voted in line with most other rural Deep South counties from 1964 to 1972. The only Democratic Party candidate to win the county since 1944 was the former Governor of Georgia, Jimmy Carter, who won it convincingly in his state-wide landslide in 1976 and narrowly in 1980.

For elections to the United States House of Representatives, Effingham County is split between Georgia's 1st congressional district and Georgia's 12th congressional district,. For elections to the Georgia State Senate, Effingham County is part of District 4. For elections to the Georgia House of Representatives, Effingham County is divided between districts 159 and 161.

United States presidential election results for Effingham County, Georgia
| Year | Republican | | Democratic | | Third party(ies) | |
| Year | No. | % | No. | % | No. | % |
|---|---|---|---|---|---|---|
| 1912 | 7 | 1.81% | 375 | 97.15% | 4 | 1.04% |
| 1916 | 64 | 12.26% | 450 | 86.21% | 8 | 1.53% |
| 1920 | 118 | 13.98% | 726 | 86.02% | 0 | 0.00% |
| 1924 | 39 | 9.61% | 337 | 83.00% | 30 | 7.39% |
| 1928 | 627 | 79.37% | 163 | 20.63% | 0 | 0.00% |
| 1932 | 90 | 14.75% | 518 | 84.92% | 2 | 0.33% |
| 1936 | 142 | 18.81% | 612 | 81.06% | 1 | 0.13% |
| 1940 | 227 | 26.40% | 633 | 73.60% | 0 | 0.00% |
| 1944 | 365 | 45.74% | 433 | 54.26% | 0 | 0.00% |
| 1948 | 160 | 12.37% | 347 | 26.84% | 786 | 60.79% |
| 1952 | 829 | 50.89% | 800 | 49.11% | 0 | 0.00% |
| 1956 | 637 | 51.04% | 611 | 48.96% | 0 | 0.00% |
| 1960 | 885 | 50.14% | 880 | 49.86% | 0 | 0.00% |
| 1964 | 2,676 | 79.74% | 680 | 20.26% | 0 | 0.00% |
| 1968 | 769 | 19.39% | 635 | 16.02% | 2,561 | 64.59% |
| 1972 | 3,175 | 86.47% | 497 | 13.53% | 0 | 0.00% |
| 1976 | 1,654 | 36.27% | 2,906 | 63.73% | 0 | 0.00% |
| 1980 | 2,528 | 47.02% | 2,783 | 51.76% | 66 | 1.23% |
| 1984 | 4,266 | 67.49% | 2,055 | 32.51% | 0 | 0.00% |
| 1988 | 3,933 | 67.13% | 1,905 | 32.51% | 21 | 0.36% |
| 1992 | 3,814 | 47.90% | 2,690 | 33.78% | 1,459 | 18.32% |
| 1996 | 5,022 | 56.76% | 3,031 | 34.26% | 795 | 8.99% |
| 2000 | 7,326 | 68.79% | 3,232 | 30.35% | 92 | 0.86% |
| 2004 | 12,503 | 77.26% | 3,613 | 22.33% | 66 | 0.41% |
| 2008 | 15,230 | 74.87% | 4,936 | 24.27% | 175 | 0.86% |
| 2012 | 15,596 | 74.79% | 4,947 | 23.72% | 311 | 1.49% |
| 2016 | 17,874 | 75.73% | 4,853 | 20.56% | 876 | 3.71% |
| 2020 | 23,361 | 73.98% | 7,718 | 24.44% | 500 | 1.58% |
| 2024 | 26,943 | 74.34% | 9,144 | 25.23% | 157 | 0.43% |

United States Senate election results for Effingham County, Georgia2
| Year | Republican | | Democratic | | Third party(ies) | |
| Year | No. | % | No. | % | No. | % |
|---|---|---|---|---|---|---|
| 2020 | 22,832 | 72.90% | 7,627 | 24.35% | 860 | 2.75% |
| 2020 | 20,680 | 74.32% | 7,147 | 25.68% | 0 | 0.00% |

United States Senate election results for Effingham County, Georgia3
| Year | Republican | | Democratic | | Third party(ies) | |
| Year | No. | % | No. | % | No. | % |
|---|---|---|---|---|---|---|
| 2020 | 12,742 | 41.14% | 4,943 | 15.96% | 13,289 | 42.90% |
| 2020 | 20,682 | 74.34% | 7,137 | 25.66% | 0 | 0.00% |
| 2022 | 18,231 | 72.04% | 6,473 | 25.58% | 604 | 2.39% |
| 2022 | 16,668 | 73.58% | 5,985 | 26.42% | 0 | 0.00% |

Georgia Gubernatorial election results for Effingham County
| Year | Republican | | Democratic | | Third party(ies) | |
| Year | No. | % | No. | % | No. | % |
|---|---|---|---|---|---|---|
| 2022 | 19,553 | 76.99% | 5,603 | 22.06% | 242 | 0.95% |

== See also ==
- National Register of Historic Places listings in Effingham County, Georgia
- List of counties in Georgia
