= List of streams in Kitsap County, Washington =

Big Beef Creek running under a bridge in western Kitsap County

Encompassing much of the Kitsap Peninsula and its surrounding islands, Kitsap County, Washington contains over 975 miles (1,569 km) of streams. Streams on the western half of the peninsula drain into Hood Canal, while the relatively smaller streams of the eastern half drain into various inlets of Puget Sound. Many of these river systems serve as habitats for migratory salmonids. The county's streams generally emerge from lakes, groundwater discharge, and wetlands, with a lack of high elevations preventing significant snowmelt contribution. Many riparian areas are forested, with both deciduous and coniferous habitats present. The county is generally rural, with the population centered on six incorporated cities along the east coast, although some stream floodplains have been cleared for agricultural and residential use.

== List ==
=== Puget Sound ===
Streams draining into Puget Sound in Kitsap County (Mainland)
Name	Mouth	Length	Named tributaries	Ref.
Eglon Creek	Puget Sound at Eglon	1.6 miles (2.6 km)	—N/a	
Silver Creek	Puget Sound north of Rolling Bay	1.3 miles (2.1 km)	—N/a	
Carpenter Creek	Appletree Cove	N/A	—N/a	
Kitsap Creek	Port Madison	N/A	—N/a	
Grovers Creek	Miller Bay	5.1 miles (8.2 km)	—N/a	
Cowling Creek	Miller Bay	N/A	—N/a	
Klabel Creek	Agate Pass	N/A	—N/a	
Sam Snyder Creek	Ne-Si-Ka Bay	N/A	—N/a	
Bjorgen Creek	Ne-Si-Ka Bay	N/A	—N/a	
Dogfish Creek	Liberty Bay	3.5 miles (5.6 km)	—N/a	
Johnson Creek	Liberty Bay	N/A	North Fork Johnson Creek	
Big Scandia Creek	Liberty Bay	2.2 miles (3.5 km)	—N/a	
Little Scandia Creek	Liberty Bay	1.8 miles (2.9 km)	—N/a	
Daniels Creek	Liberty Bay	N/A	—N/a	
Keyport Creek	Liberty Bay	N/A	—N/a	
Illahee Creek	Port Orchard at Illahee	N/A	—N/a	
Enetai Creek	Port Orchard at Enetai	0.67 miles (1.08 km)	—N/a	
Steele Creek	Burke Bay	2.1 miles (3.4 km)	—N/a	
Mosher Creek	Dyes Inlet	1.25 miles (2 km)	—N/a	
Barker Creek	Dyes Inlet	3.15 miles (5.07 km)	Hoot Creek	
Clear Creek	Dyes Inlet	3.2 miles (5.1 km)	West Fork Clear Creek	
Strawberry Creek	Dyes Inlet	2.5 miles (4.0 km)	—N/a	
Koch Creek	Dyes Inlet	1.35 miles (2.17 km)	—N/a	
Chico Creek	Dyes Inlet	6.0 miles (9.7 km) (Note: Upstream from the confluence with Lost Creek at 2.3 miles (3.7 km) from the mouth, Chico Creek is known as Wildcat Creek)	Kitsap Creek, Dickerson Creek, Lost Creek	
Wright Creek	Sinclair Inlet	1.2 miles (1.9 km)	—N/a	
Gorst Creek	Sinclair Inlet	3.9 miles (6.3 km)	Bailey's Creek, Jarstad Creek, Parish Creek, Heins Creek	
Anderson Creek	Sinclair Inlet	1.8 miles (2.9 km)	—N/a	
Ross Creek	Sinclair Inlet	1.4 miles (2.3 km)	—N/a	
Blackjack Creek	Sinclair Inlet	6.9 miles (11.1 km)	Ruby Creek, Square Creek	
Annapolis Creek	Sinclair Inlet	1.2 miles (1.9 km)	—N/a	
Olney Creek	Sinclair Inlet	1.8 miles (2.9 km)	—N/a	
Sullivan Creek	Sinclair Inlet	0.5 miles (0.80 km)	—N/a	
Sacco Creek	Sinclair Inlet	1.2 miles (1.9 km)	—N/a	
Beaver Creek	Clam Bay	2.4 miles (3.9 km)	—N/a	
Duncan Creek	Puget Sound at Manchester	0.7 miles (1.1 km)	—N/a	
Curley Creek	Yukon Harbor	5.3 miles (8.5 km)	Salmonberry Creek	
Wilson Creek	Driftwood Cove	1 mile (1.6 km)	—N/a	
Olalla Creek	Colvos Passage at Olalla	4.2 miles (6.8 km)	—N/a	
Sunrise Creek	Colvos Passage	over 0.5 miles (0.80 km)	—N/a	
Purdy Creek	Henderson Bay	3.5 miles (5.6 km)	—N/a	
Burley Creek	Henderson Bay	5.2 miles (8.4 km)	Little Bear Creek	
Minter Creek	Henderson Bay (Note: Mouth is in Pierce County, Washington)	6.3 miles (10.1 km)	Huge Creek	
Rocky Creek	Case Inlet	5.0 miles (8.0 km)	—N/a	
Coulter Creek	Case Inlet (Note: Mouth is in Mason County, Washington)	8.0 miles (12.9 km)	—N/a	

==== Bainbridge Island ====
Streams on Bainbridge Island
Name	Mouth	Length	Named tributaries	Ref.
Dripping Water Creek	Rolling Bay	1.1 miles (1.8 km)	—N/a	
Murden Cove Creek	Murden Cove	N/A	—N/a	
Ravine Creek	Eagle Harbor	1.8 miles (2.9 km)	—N/a	
Sportsmen’s Club Pond Creek	Eagle Harbor	1 mile (1.6 km)	—N/a	
Head of Bay Creek	Eagle Harbor	1 mile (1.6 km)	—N/a	
Blakely Falls Creek	Blakely Harbor	Under 1 mile (1.6 km)	—N/a	
Macs Dam Creek	Blakely Harbor	0.8 miles (1.3 km)	—N/a	
Schel-chelb Creek	Rich Passage	N/A	—N/a	
Springbrook Creek	Fletcher Bay	2.0 miles (3.2 km)	South Fork Springbrook Creek	
Issei Creek	Fletcher Bay	N/A	—N/a	
Big Manzanita Creek	Manzanita Bay	1.5 miles (2.4 km)	—N/a	

=== Hood Canal ===
Streams draining into Hood Canal in Kitsap County
Name	Mouth	Length	Named tributaries	Ref.
Hawk's Hole Creek	Hood Canal, south of Coon Bay	1.8 miles (2.9 km)	—N/a	
Jukes Creek	Hood Canal, south of Coon Bay	1.9 miles (3.1 km)	—N/a	
Shipbuilder's Creek	Hood Canal, north of Point Julia	1.8 miles (2.9 km)	—N/a	
Little Boston Creek	Port Gamble Bay at Point Julia	1.8 miles (2.9 km)	—N/a	
Middle Creek	Port Gamble Bay	1.1 miles (1.8 km)	—N/a	
Martha John Creek	Port Gamble Bay	2.4 miles (3.9 km)	—N/a	
Gamble Creek	Port Gamble Bay	4.9 miles (7.9 km)	—N/a	
Todhunter Creek	Hood Canal	1.3 miles (2.1 km)	—N/a	
Ladine DeCouteau Creek	Port Gamble Bay	0.4 miles (0.64 km)	—N/a	
Machias Creek	Hood Canal, west of Port Gamble	1.2 miles (1.9 km)	—N/a	
Spring Creek	Hood Canal, southwest of Hood Canal Bridge	1.0 mile (1.6 km)	—N/a	
Kinman Creek	Hood Canal, northeast of Lofall	2.6 miles (4.2 km)	Cougar Creek	
Jump Off Joe Creek	Hood Canal, southwest of Lofall	1.7 miles (2.7 km)	—N/a	
Cattail Creek	Hood Canal at Bangor Naval Station	1.6 miles (2.6 km)	—N/a	
Devil's Hole Creek	Hood Canal at Bangor Naval Station	1.5 miles (2.4 km)	—N/a	
Little Anderson Creek	Hood Canal, northeast of Big Beef Harbor	2.0 miles (3.2 km)	—N/a	
Johnson Creek	Hood Canal, northeast of Big Beef Harbor	1.35 miles (2.17 km)	—N/a	
Big Beef Creek	Big Beef Harbor	11 miles (18 km)	—N/a	
Little Beef Creek	Little Beef Harbor	2 miles (3.2 km)	—N/a	
Seabeck Creek	Seabeck Bay	5 miles (8.0 km)	—N/a	
Stavis Creek	Stavis Bay	4.2 miles (6.8 km)	—N/a	
Boyce Creek	Frenchman's Cove	3.9 miles (6.3 km)	—N/a	
Harding Creek	Hood Canal, southwest of Nellita	1.0 mile (1.6 km)	—N/a	
Anderson Creek	Anderson Cove	3.85 miles (6.20 km)	—N/a	
Thomas Creek	Hood Canal at Holly	0.9 miles (1.4 km)	—N/a	
Dewatto River	Dewatto Bay	8.7 miles (14.0 km)	Ludvick Lake Creek	
Tahuya River	Hood Canal at Tahuya	21.1 miles (34.0 km)	Panther Creek, Gold Creek, Tin Mine Creek	
Big Mission Creek	Hood Canal at Belfair State Park	9.85 miles (15.85 km)	—N/a	
Union River	Lynch Cove	9.7 miles (15.6 km)	Bear Creek, East Fork Union River, Hazel Creek	
