= Illahee Creek =

Location
- Country: United States
- State: Washington
- County: Kitsap County

Physical characteristics
- Mouth: Port Orchard
  - location: Illahee, Washington
  - coordinates: 47°36′38″N 122°35′45″W
- Basin size: 820 acres (330 ha)

Basin features
- Tributaries
  - left: South Fork Illahee Creek
  - right: North Fork Illahee Creek

Illahee Creek, also known as Schutt Creek, is a stream in Kitsap County, Washington. It forms from the confluence of its north and south forks and flows east through forestland into Port Orchard bay near the community of Illahee, northeast of the city limits of Bremerton. It hosts salmonids such as chum salmon, coho salmon, and cutthroat trout, and forms an estuary and adjacent salt marsh which may serve as a refuge for migratory fish. Although much of the basin is within the protected forestland of the Illahee Forest Preserve, upper portions of both forks have been subject to urban development since the mid-20th century, with additional impervious surfaces leading to increased stormwater runoff.

== Hydrology ==
The main stem of Illahee Creek forms from its north and south forks, which run through narrow, forested valleys in unincorporated portions of Kitsap County, Washington, just northeast of the city limits of Bremerton. The main stem flows east into Port Orchard bay, an arm of the Puget Sound, about 1.0 mile (1.6 km) north of Illahee State Park, near the community of Illahee. The stream's drainage basin encompasses around 820 acres (330 ha), with about 3 to 4 miles (4.8 to 6.4 km) of stream channel (including tributary streams). The creek is fed by groundwater springs and local rainwater runoff. During the drier summer months, stream flow to the north fork is provided by a wetland around 20 acres (8.1 ha) in area situated around its headwaters.

Although about two-thirds of the Illahee Creek basin is forested, parts are zoned for residential, commercial, and light industrial uses. As of 2006, there were 800 housing units in the watershed. Combined with accompanying road development, this led to about 15% of the basin being covered by impervious surfaces by 2006, increasing stormwater runoff while decreasing groundwater recharge and water quality.

The developed upper portions of the basin have suffered the most reduction in water quality, with damaged riparian buffers in both the north and south forks. The streambed substrate in the upper portions has a relative lack of large rock particles, while the substrate and riparian buffer of the lower mainstem is of high quality and largely undisturbed. Water temperatures within the basin have not been significantly impacted by development. High levels of fecal coliform bacteria were historically reported in the watershed, but conditions had improved by the 2010s.

== Biology ==
Forestland in the Illahee Forest Preserve, within the creek's watershed

Salmonids such as chum salmon, coho salmon, and cutthroat trout are known to spawn in Illahee Creek and its north and south forks. Steelhead trout make limited periodic use of the lower portion of the creek's main stem. The creek's estuary and adjacent salt marsh are uncommon along the eastern shore of Kitsap County. Due to this rarity, the estuary is likely an important refuge for juvenile salmonids and other migratory fish. The shallow intertidal zone of the estuary likely hosts large quantities of amphipods.

Illahee Creek has a well-preserved riparian corridor across most of its course, consisting of mature forest. Trees such as Douglas firs, western red cedars, and alders are present along the lower course, alongside smaller plants such as blackberries, huckleberries, salal, rhododendrons, and various ferns.

== Human history ==
The name Illahee comes from a Chinook Jargon word meaning "land". Following the region's transfer to American control in the 1855 Treaty of Point Elliott, the area around Illahee Creek became School Trust Land, public land whose sale or lease would fund public education. The area was homesteaded in the 1800s, with Illahee Road built over the stream during the 1930s. Further development began in the mid-20th century, with the Rolling Hills Golf course constructed in the basin during the 1970s. A small dam was constructed to divert water into a fishing pond. During this period, residents recalled an increase in runoff and turbid water within the creek during storms. Increased storm runoff overwhelmed the capacity of the two culverts. Identified as a potential obstacle for fish passage, these were replaced by a single wide rectangular culvert in 1999.

Much of the watershed was owned by the Washington Department of Natural Resources (WDNR) by 2000, but plans to log the forest and construct a residential development sparked political resistance from local conservationists and calls to transfer land ownership. In 2001, 352 acres (142 ha) around the creek's watershed was incorporated into the Illahee Forest Preserve, a nature park managed by a local nonprofit committee. The preserve grew to nearly 600 acres (240 ha). Storms in 2007 spilled large amounts of sediment into the basin, filling the new culvert and aggrading the floodplain by around 3 feet (0.9 m), threatening fish access.

== See also ==
- List of streams in Kitsap County, Washington
