= Norwegian Point =

Coordinates: 47°55′08″N 122°32′54″W

Norwegian Point is low and rounding, about 0.2 mile northwest of Hansville, Washington in Kitsap County, Washington, located at the northern end of the Kitsap Peninsula, affording sweeping views of Admiralty Inlet, Whidbey Island, and Puget Sound.

A conspicuous, privately owned lighthouse, Skunk Bay Lighthouse, is located 210 feet above the water about 1 mile west of Norwegian Point.
