= Point No Point Light (Washington) =

Lighthouse in Washington, United States

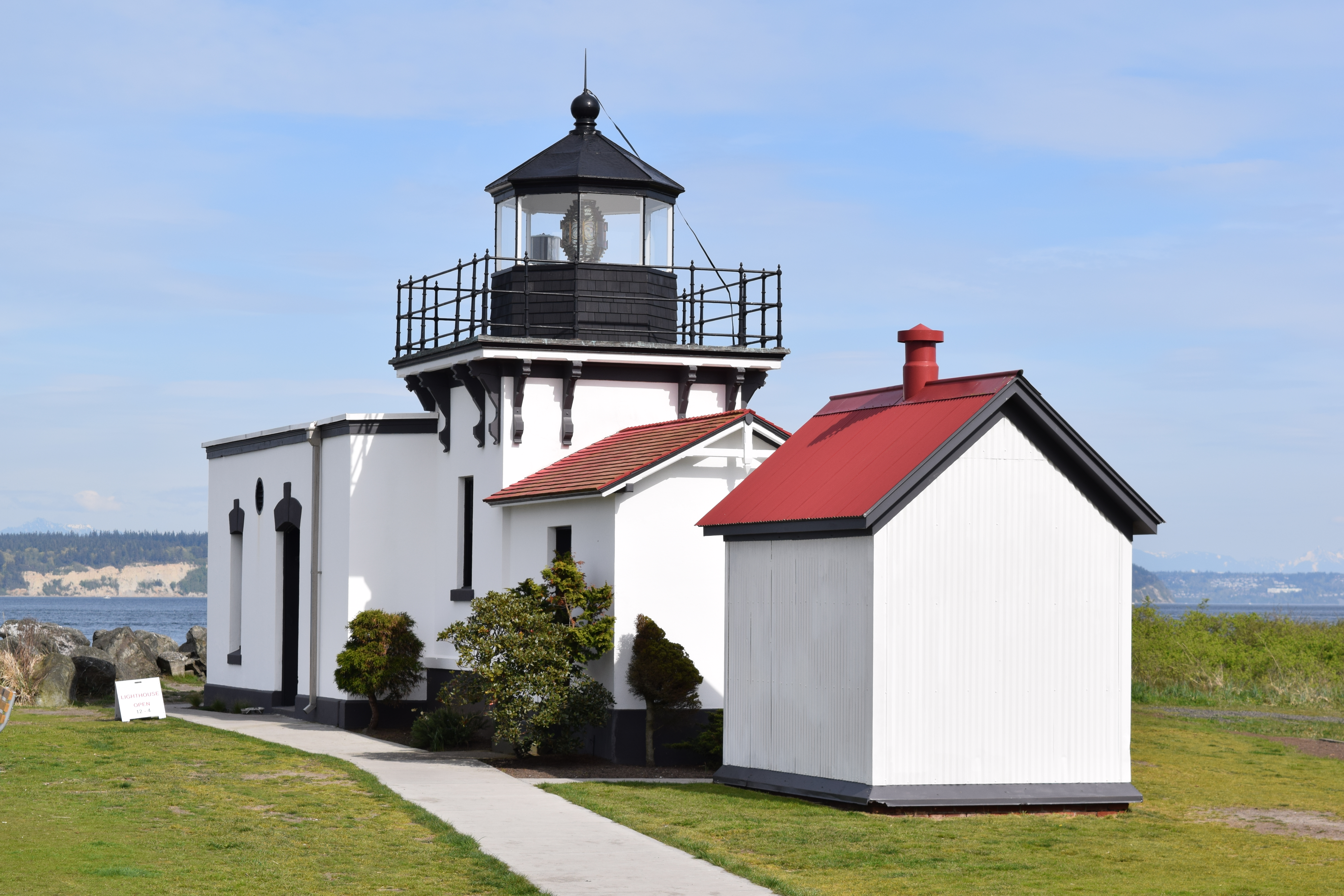
- Location: Hansville, Washington
- Coordinates: 47.9123°N 122.5268°W

Tower
- Constructed: 1879
- Foundation: Masonry
- Construction: Brick and stucco
- Automated: 1977
- Height: 30 feet (9.1 m)
- Shape: Square
- Heritage: National Register of Historic Places listed place

Light
- First lit: 1880
- Focal height: 27 feet (8.2 m)
- Lens: Fifth order Fresnel lens (1880); Fourth order Fresnel lens (1898)
- Range: 14 nmi (26 km; 16 mi)
- Characteristic: 3 white flashes every 10 s
- Point No Point Light Station
- U.S. National Register of Historic Places
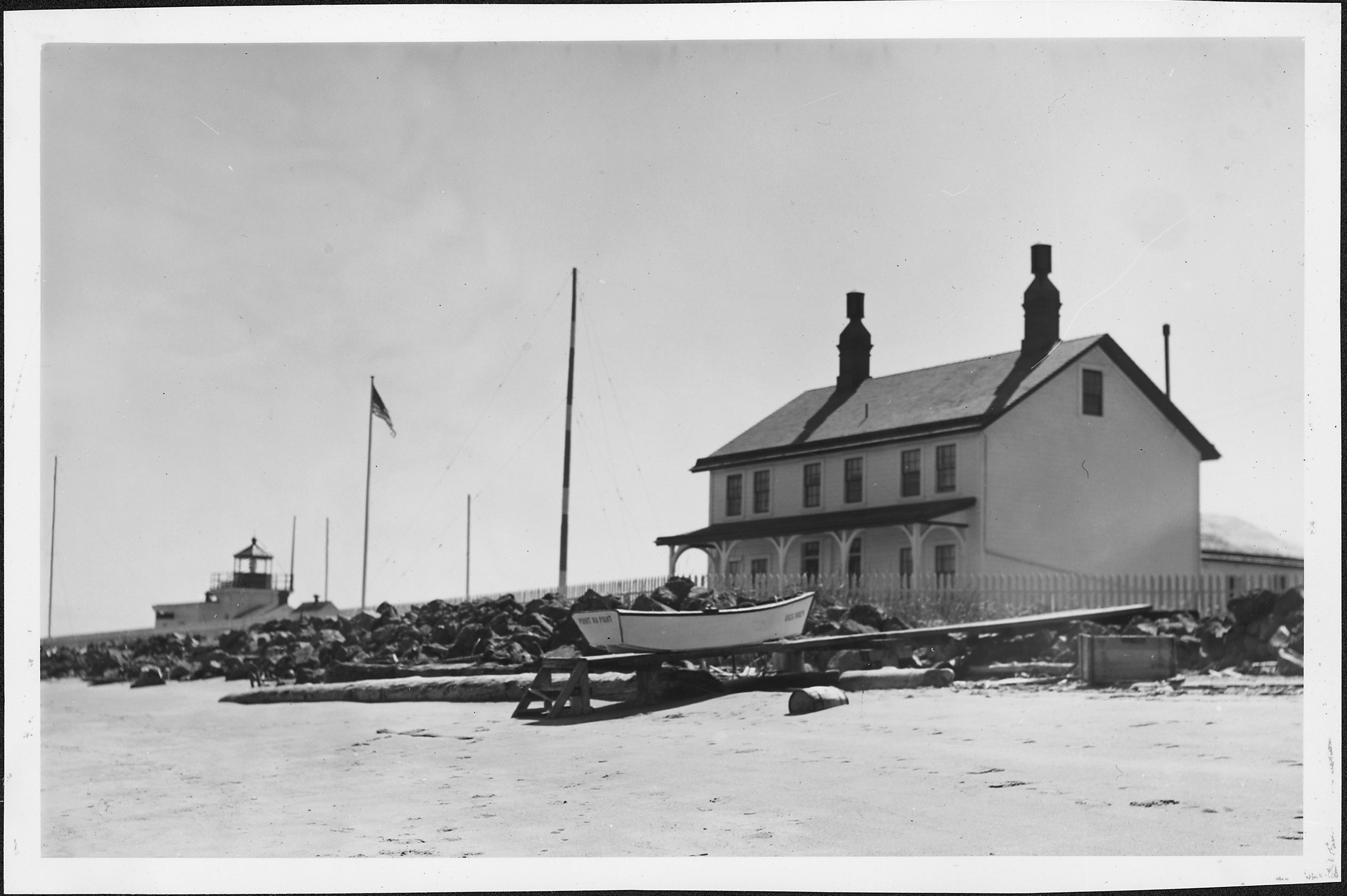
- Nearest city: Hansville, Washington
- Area: 3 acres (1.2 ha)
- Built: 1879–80
- NRHP reference No.: 78002758
- Added to NRHP: August 10, 1978

Point No Point Light is an operational aid to navigation on the northeastern tip of the Kitsap Peninsula on the west side of Puget Sound, at Point No Point where Admiralty Inlet joins Puget Sound, near the small community of Hansville, Kitsap County, in the U.S. state of Washington. Point No Point Light is considered the oldest lighthouse on Puget Sound and is listed on the National Register of Historic Places.

== History ==
Local authorities first proposed to locate the lighthouse further north on Foulweather Bluff. When the Point No Point location was agreed upon, the owners of the land were very reluctant to sell. The terms of the final sales agreement have been variously reported as 10 acres (4.0 ha) for $1,000, 40 acres (16 ha) for $1,000, and 40 acres (16 ha) for $1,800.

Construction of the lighthouse began in April 1879. The first light used was a kerosene lamp. As 1879 drew to a close, the lens and glass for the lantern had not arrived, so the first lighthouse keeper, J.S. Maggs, a Seattle dentist, hung a canvas over the south window openings to break the wind and keep the kerosene lamp from blowing out.

Upon completion of the light station in February 1880, the lantern room held a fifth-order Fresnel lens. The original masonry structure was 27 feet (8.2 m) high. The present 30-foot (9.1 m) brick and stucco tower is square and situated between the office and fog signal building. A fog signal, formerly used at New Dungeness Lighthouse, was installed in April 1880. In 1900, the fog bell was replaced by a Daboll trumpet. With no roads to the lighthouse for its first 40 years, supplies had to be brought in by boat.

In 1898, the original lens was replaced with a fourth-order fresnel lens, which is still in place although it is no longer in use. Popular history holds that when lightning struck in 1931, it caused the lens to crack. However, according to McClary, records indicate "the damage occurred when a faulty oil vaporizer tube allowed explosive vapors to build up in the light chamber." The tower was also damaged which required patching and replacing the copper tubing.

In 1975, a 90-foot (27 m) radar tower was built on the west side of the lighthouse. The tower is used for the Vessel Traffic Service (VTS). In 1977, the lighthouse became fully automated and only required one keeper to be assigned to the station. The Coast Guard replaced the light in 2006 with a low-maintenance, post-mounted, rotating beacon.

== Park and headquarters ==
In 1997, the last Coast Guard personnel left Point No Point and it stood empty until it was leased to Kitsap County Parks and Recreation. The county purchased adjoining parcels and created 60-acre (24 ha) Point No Point Lighthouse and Park. In 2012, the Department of the Interior announced the transfer of ownership of the lighthouse to Kitsap County.

Since 2008, the station's keeper's quarters has been the national headquarters of the United States Lighthouse Society, a nonprofit preservation and educational organization.

== More reading ==
- Sharlene Nelson; Ted Nelson (1998). Umbrella Guide to Washington Lighthouses. Epicenter Press. ISBN 9780945397700.
- Strait History, the quarterly publication of the Clallam County Historical Society and Museum, 1(4).
