= Point No Point Light =

Point No Point Light may refer to:

- Point No Point Light (Maryland) in the Chesapeake Bay
- Point No Point Light (Washington) in Puget Sound

== See also ==
- Point No Point
