= Phinney Bay =

Bay in Kitsap County, Washington, United States

Coordinates: 47°35′09″N 122°39′43″W

Phinney Bay is a small bay, approximately 0.8 miles long, off the northwest end of the Port Washington Narrows on the Kitsap Peninsula in Kitsap County, Washington, USA. Adjacent to Dyes Inlet, the city of Bremerton is south of the bay and East Bremerton north of the bay. Rocky Point makes up the west shore. The east side of Phinney Bay is the only part of the bay that directly borders Bremerton city limits, with the majority of the shoreline being a part of the Rocky Point census-designated place in unincorporated Kitsap County. Nearby bays include Mud Bay, Ostrich Bay, and Oyster Bay.

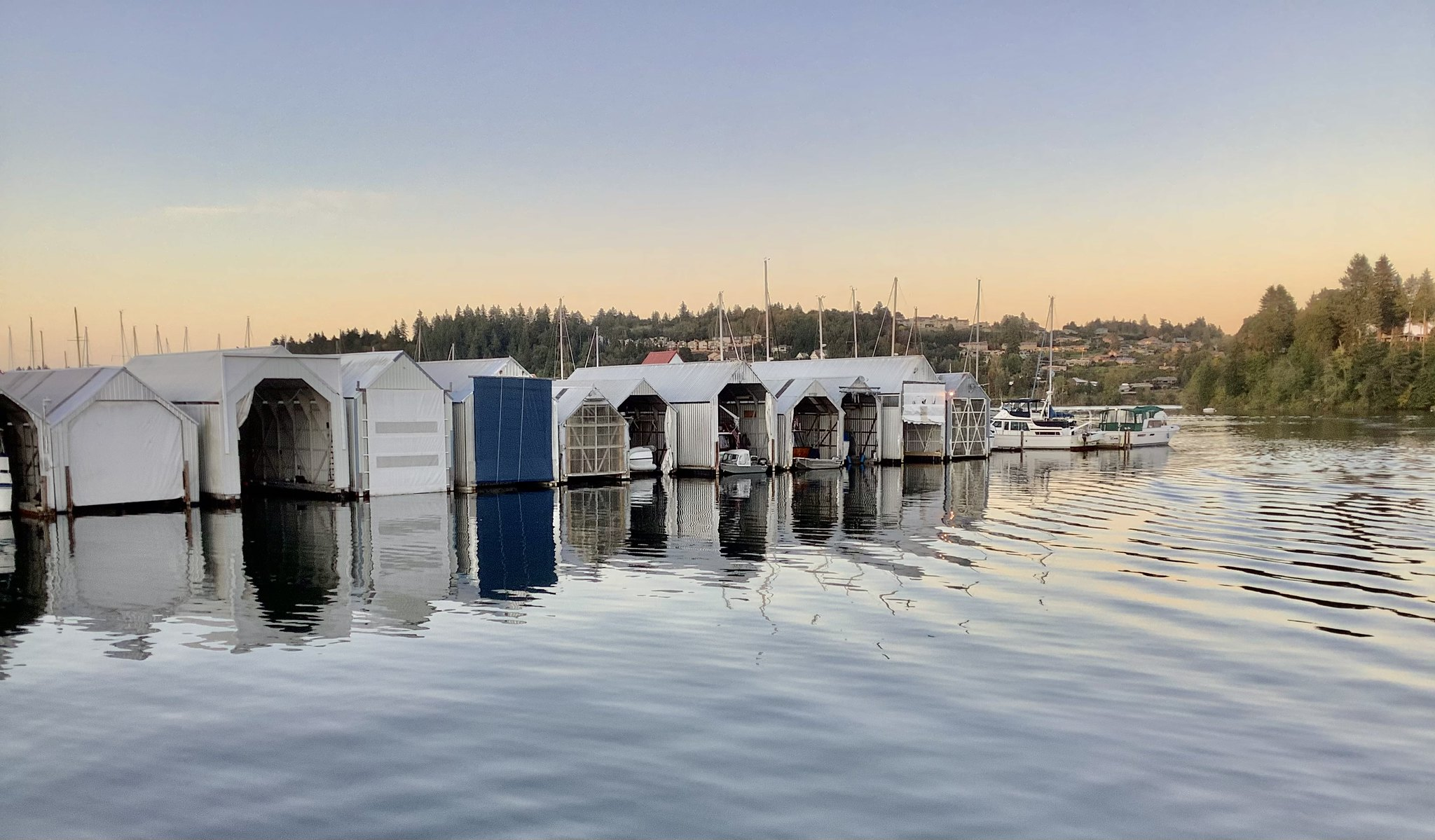
The Bremerton Yacht Club, located on Phinney Bay, pictured in 2020.

The Bremerton Yacht Club has its moorage with floats on the west side of the bay.
