= Kitsap Peninsula =

Peninsula in Puget Sound, Washington, United States

Coordinates: 47°32′59″N 122°49′05″W

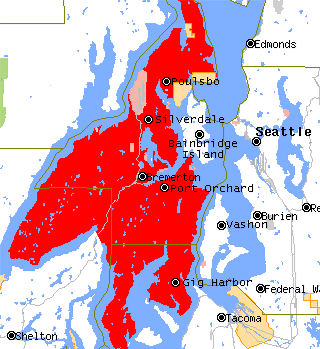
Kitsap Peninsula, Washington state

The Kitsap Peninsula (/ˈkɪtˌsæp/) lies west of Seattle across Puget Sound, in Washington state in the Pacific Northwest. Hood Canal separates the peninsula from the Olympic Peninsula on its west side. The peninsula, a.k.a. "Kitsap", encompasses all of Kitsap County except Bainbridge and Blake islands, in addition to the northeastern part of Mason County and the northwestern part of Pierce County. The highest point on the Kitsap Peninsula is Gold Mountain. The U.S. Navy's Puget Sound Naval Shipyard, and Naval Base Kitsap (comprising the former NSB Bangor and NS Bremerton) are on the peninsula. Its main city is Bremerton.

The 1841 United States Exploring Expedition, led by Charles Wilkes of the U.S. Navy, named it the Great Peninsula or Indian Peninsula. While "Great Peninsula" remains the official name, the name "Kitsap Peninsula" is more commonly used and is derived from Kitsap County, which occupies most of the peninsula. The county was named for Chief Kitsap, a late 18th- and 19th-century warrior and medicine man of the Suquamish Tribe. The Suquamish were one of the historical fishing tribes belonging to the Coast Salish peoples, and their ancestral grounds were based on the eastern shores of the Kitsap Peninsula. The city of Seattle is named after the tribe's most famous leader, Chief Seattle.

The Port Madison Indian Reservation, located between Poulsbo and Agate Pass, is the modern Suquamish tribal center. The Kitsap Peninsula is also home to the Port Gamble S'Klallam Tribe, another branch of Coast Salish people; their tribal center is the Port Gamble S'Klallam Indian Reservation at Little Boston, located on the northwest coast of the peninsula. A third subgroup of the Coast Salish are the Twana, who historically also occupied the area around the Hood Canal. Their main center now is at Skokomish.

The peninsula is connected to the eastern shore of Puget Sound by Washington State Ferries, which run from Bremerton to Downtown Seattle; from Kingston to Edmonds; and from Southworth to West Seattle via Vashon Island. Several passenger ferry routes are operated by Kitsap Fast Ferries from these terminals to Downtown Seattle. It is also connected by the Tacoma Narrows Bridge from Point Fosdick to Tacoma, and to the west, to the northeastern shore of the main Olympic Peninsula by the Hood Canal Bridge. Land connections through the isthmus at Belfair include SR 3 and the Puget Sound and Pacific Railroad.

== Cities and towns ==
- Annapolis
- Bangor
- Belfair
- Bremerton
- Brownsville
- Colby
- Colchester
- Chico
- East Port Orchard
- Erlands Point
- Gig Harbor
- Gorst
- Hansville
- Illahee
- Indianola
- Keyport
- Kingston
- Kitsap Lake
- Manchester
- Navy Yard City
- Olalla
- Parkwood
- Port Gamble
- Port Orchard
- Poulsbo
- Purdy
- Retsil
- Scandia
- Seabeck
- Silverdale
- Southworth
- Suquamish
- Tahuya
- Tracyton

== Bays and inlets ==
- Agate Pass
- Anderson Cove
- Appletree Cove
- Big Beef Harbor
- Burke Bay
- Burley Lagoon
- Carr Inlet
- Case Inlet
- Chico Bay
- Clam Bay
- Colvos Passage
- Coon Bay
- Dogfish Bay
- Dyes Inlet
- Hood Canal
- Horsehead Bay
- Liberty Bay
- Little Beef Harbor
- Little Clam Bay
- Miller Bay
- Mud Bay
- Nesika Bay
- Olalla Bay
- Orrs Cove
- Ostrich Bay
- Oyster Bay
- Phinney Bay
- Pilots Cove
- Port Gamble
- Port Madison
- Port Orchard
- Port Washington Narrows
- Races Cove
- Rich Passage
- Seabeck Bay
- Sinclair Inlet
- Skunk Bay
- Stavis Bay
- Stiles Lagoon
- Tacoma Narrows
- Yukon Harbor

== Headlands ==
- Anderson Point
- Apple Cove Point aka Apple Tree Point
- Bass Point
- Command Point
- Elwood Point
- Erlands Point
- Foulweather Bluff
- Hood Point
- King Spit
- Scandia Point
- Lemolo Point
- Madrona Point
- Manette Peninsula
- Middle Point
- Norwegian Point
- Orchard Point
- Pearson Point
- Pilot Point
- Point Bolin
- Point Glover
- Point Herron
- Point Jefferson
- Point Julia
- Point Misery
- Point No Point
- Point Southworth
- Point Turner
- President Point
- Rocky Point
- Ross Point
- Ruby Point
- Salisbury Point
- Sandy Hook
- Teekalet Bluff
- Tekiu Point
- Twin Spits
- University Point
- Virginia Point
- Waterman Point
- Windy Point, Puget Sound
