= Chester Rock Light =

Lighthouse in Connecticut, United States

- Location: Chester Rock, Chester, Connecticut, United States
- Coordinates: 41°23′N 72°25′W

Tower
- Constructed: 1889
- Construction: concrete (foundation), lumber (tower)
- Height: 21 ft (6.4 m)
- Shape: hexagonal tower with balcony and lantern
- Markings: Black (lantern)

Light
- First lit: 1 July 1889
- Deactivated: 1912
- Lens: 6th order Fresnel lens
- Characteristic: F W (1892–)
- Current light
- Constructed: 1912
- Construction: concrete (foundation), steel (tower)
- Height: 23 ft (7.0 m)
- Shape: square pyramid
- Markings: White (foundation), green (daymark)
- Power source: solar power
- First lit: 22 October 1912
- Focal height: 26 ft (7.9 m)
- Lens: LED
- Intensity: 170 candela
- Characteristic: Fl G 4s

Chester Rock Light was a light in Chester, Connecticut on the Connecticut River. It was built in 1889 as part of a $15,000 appropriation by the United States Congress. The 21-foot (6.4 meter) tall wooden hexagonal pyramidal tower had a black lantern with a 6th order Fresnel lens. The light was first lit on July 1, 1889. The tower was replaced in 1912 by a skeleton tower that was subsequently modified in 1927. Records do not show the deactivation or destruction of the light, but it was believed to have been removed in the 1930s. In the 1990s, the Deep River Historical Society of Deep River, Connecticut wanted to build a replica of the structure for use as a daymark.

== Construction ==
The Chester Rock Light was constructed in 1889 as part of a $15,000 appropriation by Congress that included several other beacons. The exact cost of the structure is unknown. Originally constructed as a 21-foot (6.4 meter) tall wooden hexagonal pyramidal tower, the Chester Rock Light had a black lantern with a 6th order Fresnel lens. First lit on July 1, 1889, with a fixed red light the light was changed to a fixed white light on December 15, 1892. According to the Light List, the light was located on Chester Rock on the west side of the Connecticut River and about .75 miles (1.21 km) north of Deep River, Connecticut.

A Lighthouse Inspection Report from the United States Lighthouse Society from December 1889 states that the hexagonal tower was only accessible by boat. The light's foundation rested upon the river bottom and was a 15-foot (4.6 meter) square crib that was made of yellow pine timbers and sheathed with planks. The crib was filled with stones and protected by riprap. The crib extended up to the high water mark to a frustum of a 15 feet (4.6 m) square pyramid that is reduced to 10 feet (3.0 m) at its top and filled with stone. The sides and top are planked and the corners were covered with boiler plate and angle irons. The original light was a hexagonal beacon lantern made of brass and copper. The oil for the light was stored in boxes in the lower portion of the lantern.

== Skeleton tower ==
According to the Annual Report of the Lighthouse Board, the tower was struck and carried away by a barge being towed by Sachem, a tugboat, on May 10, 1912. The cost of repairs, $602.40, was paid by the owner. During the intervening period, a temporary light post was used in its place. Completed on October 22, 1912, the replacement skeletal tower was a pyramidal steel structure on a concrete base that held its oil internally. The base of the tower was painted white and the daymark was painted black. The skeleton tower lantern was raised to 25 feet (7.6 m) above the water and its light had about 170 candlepower.

It is unknown if a new skeleton tower was installed at a different location than the original tower or if an intervening tower was previously erected in the same location, but the original stone foundation is visible 100 feet (30 m) from the west bank. In 1900, the geographical coordinates were then given as 41.2354 North and 72.2602 West, but this differs from the modern GPS location which is 41.2322 North and 72.2450 West.

== Service ==
Service records for Chester Rock Light show that the light was deactivated for the winter of 1911 and 1914. In 1914, the light was deactivated between January 12–15 and relit between March 14–16. The skeleton tower was modified in 1927, but there are no records about additional work or action with the light. In 1931, an article in The Day noted that the skeleton tower was "in recent years" converted to automatic gas beacons. As of 2014, the skeleton tower is known as Light 35 and features a green flashing light every 4 seconds.

In the 1990s, the Deep River Historical Society of Deep River, Connecticut discovered a photo of the light and began to research its history. Joel Severance, chairman of the harbor commission, wanted to build a 28-foot (8.5 meter) tall replica that would primarily function as a daymark and their plan was endorsed by the Connecticut Department of Transportation in the United States Coast Guard and both the town of Deep River and Middlesex County, Connecticut, but it was expected to be denied by the Connecticut Department of Environmental Protection. In 2000, the plan was rejected by the Connecticut Department of Environmental Protection.

== See also ==
- List of lighthouses in Connecticut
- List of lighthouses in the United States
