= Twin Spits, Washington =

Unincorporated community in Washington, United States

Twin Spits
- Unincorporated community
- Location within the state of Washington
- Coordinates: 47°55′35″N 122°36′40″W
- Country: United States
- State: Washington
- County: Kitsap
- Elevation: 75 ft (23 m)
- Time zone: UTC-8 (Pacific (PST))
  - Summer (DST): UTC-7 (PDT)
- GNIS feature ID: 1511715

Twin Spits is a small unincorporated community in Kitsap County, Washington, United States. It is located within the Hansville CDP.
