= Springbrook Creek (Washington) =

Location
- Country: United States
- State: Washington
- County: Kitsap County
- City: Bainbridge Island

Physical characteristics
- Mouth: Fletcher Bay
  - coordinates: 47°38′50″N 122°34′05″W
- Length: 2.0 mi (3.2 km)
- Basin size: 999 acres (404 ha)

Springbrook Creek is a stream on Bainbridge Island in Western Washington, United States. Emerging from various small tributary streams, the creek flows generally northwest through areas of wetland before draining into Fletcher Bay, an arm of Port Orchard in the larger Puget Sound. The creek has a wide estuary and mudflat at its mouth, shared with Issei Creek and two seasonal streams. Among the largest creeks on the island, it hosts salmonids such as cutthroat trout and coho salmon. During the Last Ice Age, the Vashon Glaciation deposited till over the island, which was weathered and eroded into a network of streams. The basin is now largely covered by secondary forest and wetlands. Initially inhabited by the Suquamish people, the island was clearcut by American settlers by the early 20th century. The watershed is now largely occupied by rural residential areas and hobby farms. High summer temperatures and contamination from roads and nearby agriculture pose water quality concerns.

== Course ==
Springbrook Creek is about 2.0 miles (3.2 km) long, draining a western portion of Bainbridge Island, Washington. Various small tributary streams flow into the main stem, which flows generally northwest through an area of wetland. The large number of tributaries leads to some confusion on the identity and path of the main stem. South Fork Springbrook Creek, a perennial tributary, originates from the southwest from the Gazzam Lake Preserve, while an unnamed seasonal tributary originates from residential areas to the northeast. Shortly upstream from its mouth, Springbrook Creek passes through a road culvert and a stepped weir system. It empties into Fletcher Bay, an arm of Port Orchard in the Puget Sound, at a wide estuary and mudflat shared with Issei Creek and two seasonal streams, North Fletcher Bay Creek and Foster's Creek.

== Hydrology ==
Draining an area of 999 acres (404 ha), the Springbrook Creek watershed makes up 47% of the broader Fischer Bay drainage basin. It is among the largest creeks on Bainbridge Island. The watershed contains over 7 miles (11 km) of streams, including about 4.7 miles (7.6 km) suitable as fish habitat. During the summer, the region has small and infrequent rainstorms. As such, the creek's water is almost entirely derived from groundwater during this period.

=== Geology ===
Bainbridge Island largely consists of glacial deposits from the Quaternary glaciations. These are especially common from the Vashon Glaciation, the most recent glacial episode in the region. During the Vashon Glaciation, from about 17,600 to 16,600 years ago, Bainbridge was covered by the Puget Lobe of the Cordilleran ice sheet. At its greatest point, about 16,900 years ago, the ice sheet over the island was about 0.6 miles (1 km) thick. Deposits in the region of Springbrook Creek include Vashon glacial till and outwash. Parts of the lower Springbrook watershed consist of fluvioglacial beds of gravel, sand, silt, and peat. Due to the presence of basaltic sandstone in this gravel, this material likely originated from the Olympic Mountains to the west.

The glacial deposits were eroded over the course of the Holocene by both weathering and the flow of surface water and shallow groundwater, resulting in the network of streams that form Springbrook Creek. Some low-lying areas around the creek are dominated by more recent wetland deposits, such as mud, peat, and muck. The basin has steeper terrain in its southern half than in the north.

== Biology ==
Springbrook Creek is a key habitat for salmonid spawning. Cutthroat trout and coho salmon frequently use the creek, both adapted to small creeks. Steelhead trout were attested in a 1982 survey, but by 2018 had not recently been noted in the watershed. Chum salmon are present only in small quantities, while juvenile Chinook salmon may reside in lower portions of the creek and its estuary as they acclimate to saltwater. The western brook lamprey and several species of sculpin are attested in Springbrook Creek, while surf smelt and Pacific sand lance are likely present in the estuary.

About 70% of the Springbrook Creek basin is covered by secondary forest, with the most common trees including Douglas fir, western red cedar, bigleaf maple, Pacific madrone, and alders. Forested depressional wetlands are found throughout the watershed. Skunk cabbage has been noted in sloped wetland areas, likely indicating high levels of water saturation.

=== Water quality ===
Surveys from 2008 to 2014 found moderately depressed levels of benthic invertebrates in Springbrook Creek. Although good conditions were only found in one sampling year, the stream's benthos was significantly better than many other watersheds on Bainbridge. Out of all the other streams on the island, only Cooper Creek had a sampling year with good conditions. Stagnant ponds for agricultural use drain into Springbrook Creek, resulting in increased water temperatures and possibly greater water loss from evaporation.

Compared to other parts of the watershed, the middle reaches of Springbrook Creek are in relatively poor environmental condition. Stormwater runoff from nearby roads and construction sites deposits fine sediment into the creek, which may impact fish habitats. High summer temperatures and correspondingly low levels of dissolved oxygen were noted in a 2018 survey, with conditions worsened due to a lack of shade and riparian buffer zones in some areas. Both human and wildlife fecal bacteria contamination, of unknown origins, was present in the stream.

== Human history ==
Prior to Euro-American colonization in the 1800s, Bainbridge Island was covered by heavy western red cedar, Douglas fir, and western hemlock forests. The Suquamish, one of the Coast Salish peoples, maintained seasonal settlements on the island. By the end of the 1800s, American settlers had founded a major lumber and shipbuilding industry on the island, and the forests were clearcut by the early 1900s.

The wetlands in the central and northeastern portions of the Springbrook Creek watershed were cleared for agriculture. Tributary streams were channelized and diverted towards property lines, allowing for the wetland depressions to be drained. These alterations allowed the invasive reed canarygrass to spread. Livestock farmers allowed cattle to access the creek freely, and created irrigation ponds using small dams. A settlement known as Island Center emerged in the northern part of the watershed, which hosted two major dairies alongside smaller farms. During the early 20th century, Japanese American migrants in the basin began farming rhubarb, raspberries, loganberries, and strawberries, the first such operations in Kitsap County.

In 1982, a fisheries biologist began working with a team of Boy Scouts to rehabilitate Springbrook Creek for salmonid use, with one Eagle Scout growing salmon eggs to raise and release into the stream. The Washington Department of Fisheries released 5,000 fingerling salmon into the creek in 1989, seeking to encourage spawning. Three years later, a storm and flooding damaged the creek's culvert, blocking off fish passage. The culvert and weir system was replaced by the Bainbridge Island city government in late 1996, accompanied by the release of cutthroat trout, coho salmon, and guppies into pools near the weir.

A gauging station was opened at Springbrook Creek in March 2004. A 2018 Washington State Department of Ecology survey praised efforts by landowners to replant forest buffer zones around streams, but criticized the culvert and weir system as prone to failure and as a potential blockade for migratory fish. That year, the Bainbridge Land Trust purchased 23 acres (9.3 ha) of wetland and forest in the watershed, establishing it as the Springbrook Creek Preserve. By the 2020s, sandbags were placed yearly around the stream's weir system to raise the water level and allow salmon to bypass it.

=== Modern land use ===
The watershed is largely forested, although some areas, especially in the northern half of the Springbrook Creek basin, have been altered for rural residential use, and feature homes, outbuildings, pasture, and roads. Hobby farms have succeeded commercial agriculture in the area. Combined, the City of Bainbridge Island and the Bainbridge Island Land Trust manage 68.4 acres (27.7 ha) of conservation area around the watershed.

Some of the island's major roads run through the watershed. Congestion on Washington State Route 305 to the east has led Fletcher Bay Road NE to emerge as a popular north-south route, impacting the stream's water quality. All drinking water on the island is sourced from aquifers.
