= Buck Lake (Kitsap County) =

Lake in Kitsap County, WA, USA

Coordinates: 47°54′38″N 122°33′33″W

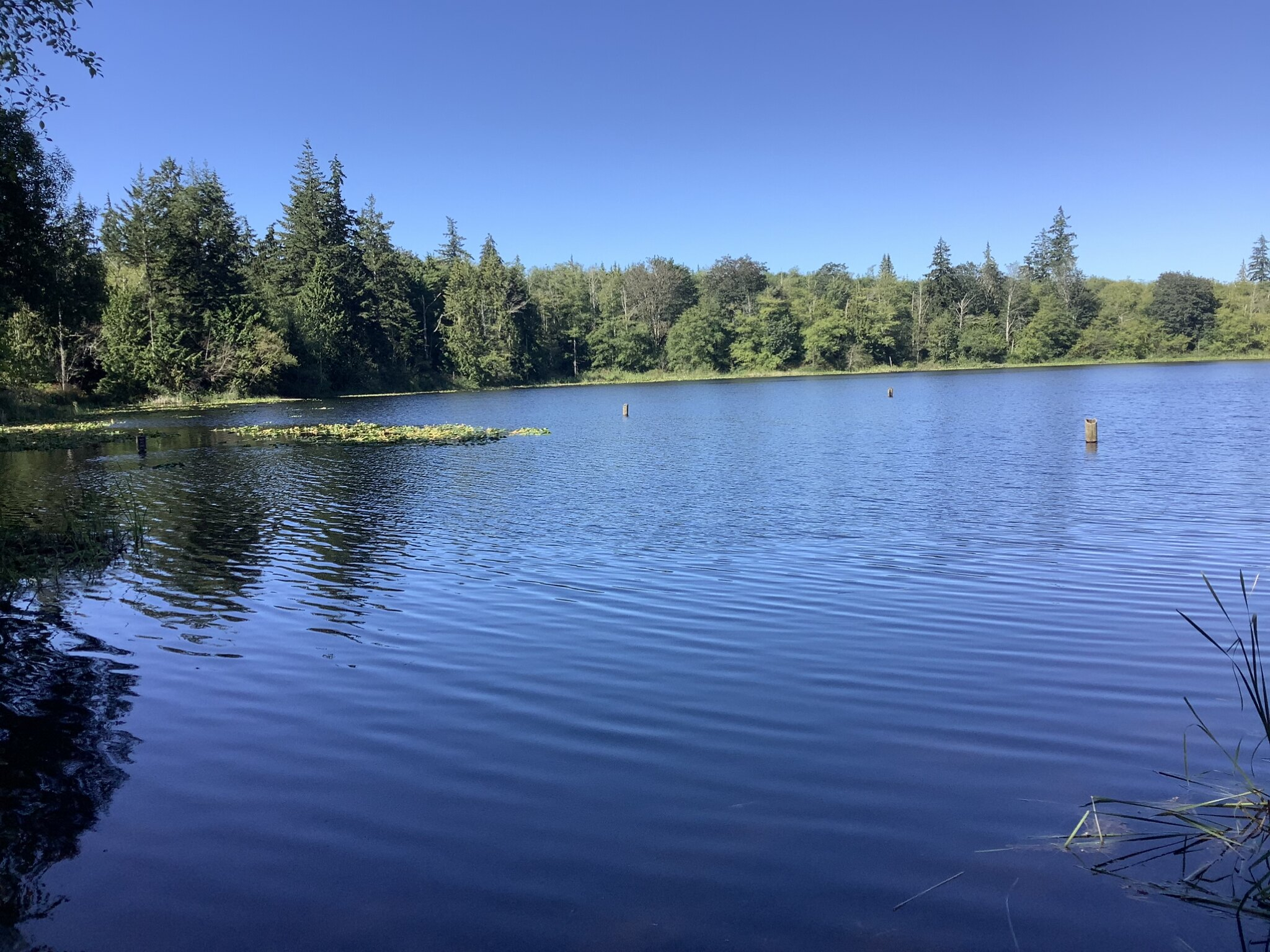
Buck Lake in 2022

Buck Lake is a small lake in unincorporated Kitsap County, Washington. The lake, near the unincorporated census-designated place of Hansville, occupies an area of 18.6 acres at a maximum depth of 24 feet. The lake takes its name from a buck, though the exact species it references is unclear. Bird species such as the Osprey and Great Blue Heron have been present at the lake. In 2009, the Kitsap County Planning and Environmental Programs division found an improving trend for E. coli bacteria levels.

The Buck Lake County Park is located at the southeast corner of the lake, which has picnic areas, restrooms, beach access, volleyball and basketball courts, and a ball field. A new playground was completed in 2019, the Kitsap County Parks Department's first ADA-compliant playground. To the west and south of the lake is the Hansville Greenway, a 264-acre nature preserve with walking and equestrian trails in a wetland environment. The Greater Hansville Community Center is also located at the lake.

Buck Lake is a swimming destination. All swimming lake beaches in the county, including Buck Lake, have free loaner life jackets for children. Like other county beaches, water quality is monitored by the Kitsap Public Health District every other week. The lake was staffed by lifeguards until 2006. Unlike other popular county lakes such as Island Lake and Horseshoe Lake, there are much fewer residences on Buck Lake and the watershed is described as "rural residential" and "rural wooded."

Buck Lake is also known for rainbow trout fishing, with well over 1,400 fish being released annually by the Washington Department of Fish and Wildlife. Since 2018, the majority of fish released into Buck Lake have been raised at Eells State Trout Hatchery near Skokomish, WA. There is a gravel boat launch on the east shore of the lake.
