= Coon Bay =

Harbor in Washington state, US

Coordinates: 47°54′23″N 122°35′7″W

Coon Bay, also known as Sheltered Bay, is a small, nearly landlocked harbor, which opens to the Hood Canal about 2.5 miles south of Foulweather Bluff. Although non-member space is limited, the harbor offers excellent protection for small boats during periods of rough weather. The privately dredged entrance channel is narrow and has a reported controlling depth of about 3 feet. There are several private piers inside the entrance.

It lies near the town of Hansville, Washington, adjacent to a group of subdivisions generally called "Driftwood Key" or "Driftwood Keys". The bay was originally dredged from a marshy estuary in 1963 in order to facilitate recreational boat access to Coon Bay and residential development. Prior to the development, it was a private duck and black brant hunting area. Over a dozen subdivisions were eventually platted, with both shoreline and upland residential lots. The area is the location of the "Driftwood Key Club", which provides its members with access to the private marina, boat launch, swimming pool and clubhouse.
