= Port Gamble Forest Heritage Park =

Park in Washington, United States

Coordinates: 47°49′N 122°36′W

Port Gamble Forest Heritage Park

Port Gamble Forest Heritage Park is a 3,493-acre (1,414 ha) county park founded in 2014, and is the largest in Kitsap County, Washington. It contains 60 miles (97 km) of trails.

The park property was acquired from Pope Resources/Olympic Resource Management, a forestry company, partly in direct purchases by the county government, and partly by the Forterra land conservation non-profit corporation who raised funds through individual donations and grants.

Olympic Resource Management's Olympic Property Group proposed a public trail system in its Port Gamble property c. 2007. Invoking the Olmsted Brothers park planning, local groups envisioned a regional "String of Pearls" trail plan c. 2011 in the Pacific Northwest linking water trails linking the Olympic National Park on the Olympic Peninsula with the Kitsap Peninsula. A proposed system, the Sound to Olympics Trail, would allow one to cross Washington State by foot on a continuous trail system from the Pacific Ocean to the Idaho border. Kitsap County plans to embody a portion of the Sound to Olympics Trail in the Port Gamble Forest.
