= Illahee State Park =

State park in Washington (state), United States

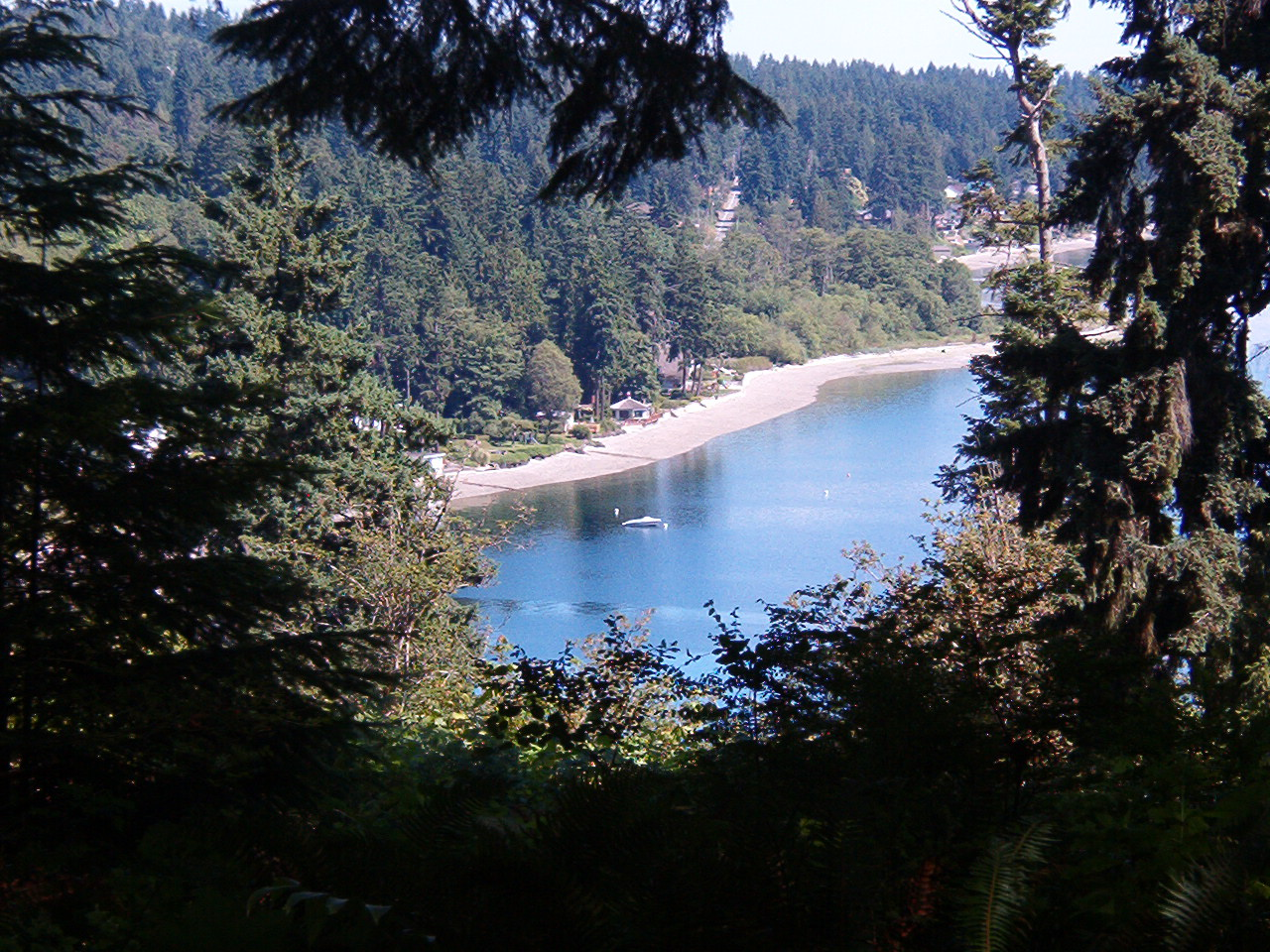

- Location within Washington (state) Location within the United States
- Location: Kitsap County, Washington, United States
- Coordinates: 47°35′53″N 122°35′52″W
- Area: 82 acres (33 ha)
- Elevation: 269 ft (82 m)
- Established: 1934
- Administrator: Washington State Parks and Recreation Commission
- Visitors: 250,832 (in 2024)
- Website: Official website

Illahee State Park is an 82-acre (33 ha) Washington state park located in the hamlet of Illahee, just north of East Bremerton, on Port Orchard Bay, part of Puget Sound. The word illahee means earth or land in Chinook Jargon. The park was established when Kitsap County donated 13 acres to the state in 1934. The park's old-growth stand is home to one of the nation's oldest Pacific yews, which has been standing for approximately 400 years. Park activities include picnicking, camping, hiking, boating, and shellfish harvesting.

== Shellfish harvesting status ==
The official shellfish harvesting status of Illahee State Park is maintained by the Washington State Department of Health. In addition, environmental contaminants of the surface-water and Mytilus tissues at Illahee State Park are monitored routinely by local ecology programs. While historical monitoring has reported low concentrations of heavy metals over the past decade (2010-2020), the presence of carcinogenic polycyclic aromatic hydrocarbons (cPAHs) in Mytilus tissues should be considered by recreational and subsistence consumers. PAH concentrations in Puget Sound have been highlighted by the National Oceanic and Atmospheric Administration as being the highest in the nation and cPAH regulatory thresholds for Washington State consumers have been calculated by the Washington State Department of Ecology. The following table provides Washington State cPAH thresholds (current as of 2020) for general fish consumption and available historical tissue burdens at Illahee State Park.

Concentrations of cPAHs in Mytilus collected from Illahee State Park (2010-2020)
		POPILSP^{*} cPAHs (ng g^{−1} ww)						
MSL-ID	Collection Year	Benzo(a)anthracene	Chrysene	Benzo(b)fluoranthene	Benzo(k)fluoranthene	Benzo(a)pyrene	Indeno(1,2,3-cd)pyrene	Dibenz(a,h)anthracene
	TEC_{C}^{†}	0.63	63	0.63	6.3	0.063	0.63	0.063
3106-198	2010	17.8	40.3	22.6	7.76	7.69	3.81	1.47
3106-797	2012	4.21	7.76	5.00	2.41	1.54	ND	ND
3431-1	2014	3.00	6.50	4.47	1.62	ND	ND	ND
3538-7	2016	10.6	14.5	8.36	4.85	3.62	ND	ND
3538-73 to 75	2018	5.56	8.93	7.35	3.43	3.12	ND	ND
3538-118	2020	4.78	9.39	3.40	3.68	1.60	0.833	0.268
^{*}tissue burdens represent composites of three substations, covering the Illahee State Park beach area and dock pilings (pilings contain creosote)
^{†}TEC_{C}s (tissue exposure concentrations with carcinogenic effects) based on 10^{−6} risk level, 80 kg body weight, and 175 g d^{−1} tissue ingestion
