= Brownsville, Washington =

Unincorporated community in Washington, United States

- Unincorporated community
- Location in Washington and the United States Brownsville (the United States)
- Coordinates: 47°39′20″N 122°36′55″W
- Country: United States
- State: Washington
- County: Kitsap
- Time zone: UTC-8 (Pacific (PST))
  - Summer (DST): UTC-7 (PDT)
- GNIS feature ID: 1510841

Brownsville is an unincorporated community in Kitsap County, Washington, United States. It is located north of Bremerton and due east of Silverdale and on the north side of Burke Bay on the Kitsap Peninsula.

Brownsville has a harbor and marina. The community is primarily residential.

== Brownsville Cemetery ==
In 2009, an incident of illegal tree cutting brought attention to the historic graveyard located at Roanoke and Roy Streets.
