= United States Lighthouse Society =

American historic preservation organization

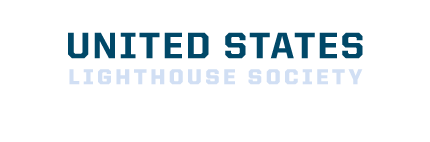
- Formation: 1984; 42 years ago
- Headquarters: Hansville, Washington
- Official language: English
- President: Wayne Wheeler
- Key people: Jeff Gales (Executive-Director)
- Budget: $732,294 (2012)
- Website: uslhs.org

The United States Lighthouse Society (USLHS) is a non-profit organization dedicated to aiding in the restoration of American lighthouses and educating the public about their history. With four chapters, and more than a dozen affiliates, it is one of the largest and oldest lighthouse organizations in the world.

== History ==
Founded in 1983 by Wayne Wheeler and initially headquartered in San Francisco, California, one of the United States Lighthouse Society's first major projects was the purchase of the lightship LV605 in 1986 from a private individual. The organization subsequently invested $400,000 and more than 40,000 volunteer hours in the preservation and restoration of the vessel. In 2003 the society received the California Governor's Historic Preservation Award for its work on the ship.

The society relocated from California to Hansville, Washington in 2008, siting its headquarters at the historic Point No Point Lighthouse, which it restored and leased from Kitsap County (the county has a long term license from the U.S. Coast Guard to keep the site open as a park).

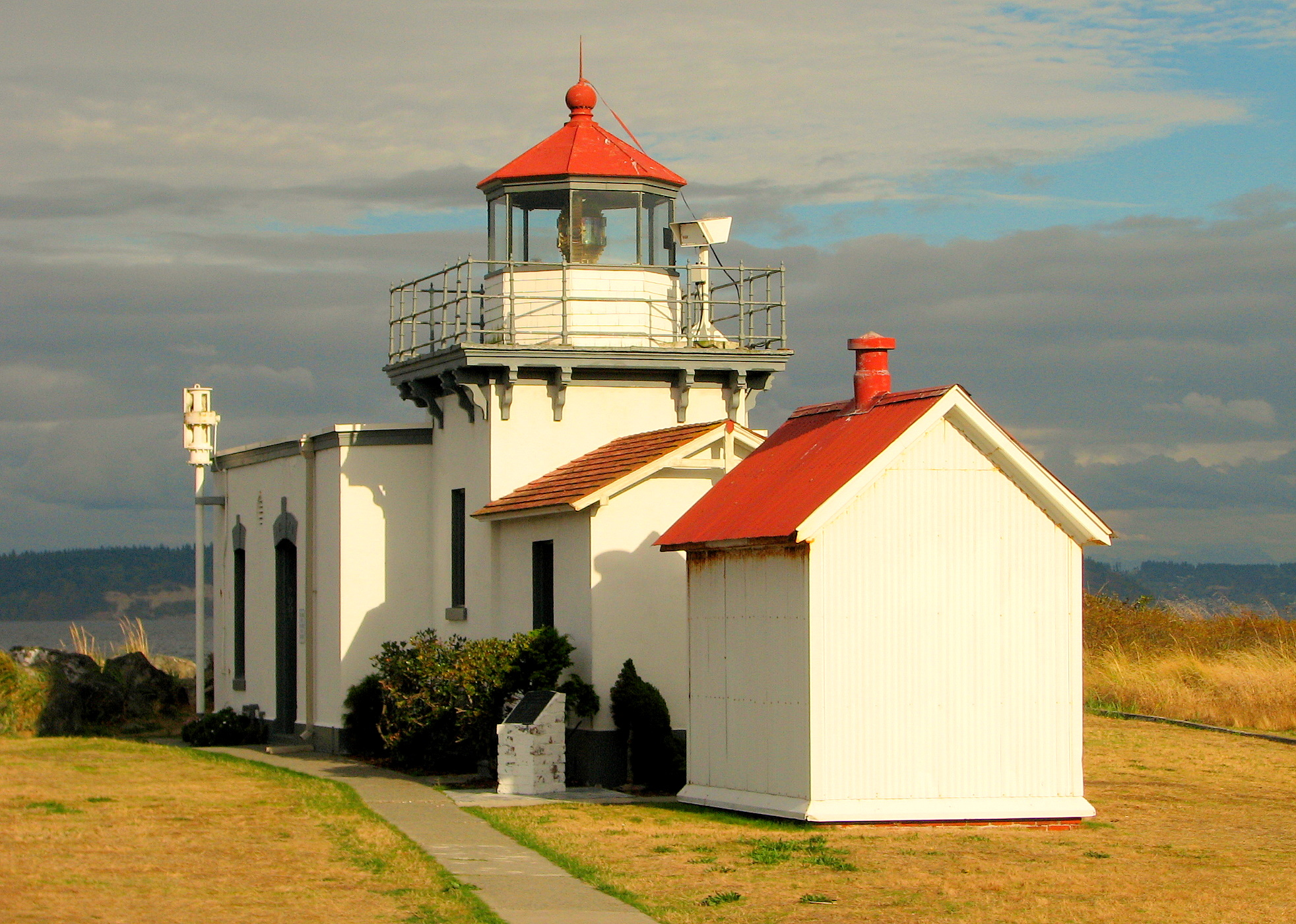
Since 2008, the United States Lighthouse Society has been headquartered in the historic "Keeper's House" on the grounds of the Point No Point Light (shown here) in Hansville, Washington.

In 2009 the U.S. Lighthouse Society was recognized as a "Preserve America Steward," one of the first 11 cultural and historic organizations designated to receive the Bureau of Land Management-sponsored award in recognition of "a successful use of volunteer time and commitment." One of the Society's corporate sponsors was the clothing brand Lands' End in 2014. Under the terms of the deal, Lands' End made a donation of $30,000 to support restoration of the Block Island Southeast Lighthouse in Block Island, Rhode Island and additional funds to support the creation of a historic structures report for the eventual restoration of the Alcatraz Island Lighthouse, CA.

== Activities ==
=== Preservation ===
The society actively raises money, organizes volunteers, publishes educational materials and maintains a historic archive/library dedicated to preserving and restoring lighthouses: some of these projects include the Point No Point Lighthouse in Washington state, Thomas Point Shoal Lighthouse in Maryland, and Lightship LV605, currently moored in Oakland, California.

=== Publications ===
The society publishes a quarterly print magazine, The Keepers' Log, about the history of lighthouses in the United States and the quarterly "Lighthouse Fun For Kids". A third quarterly publication, Lighthouse Bulletin, chronicles society activities and is distributed in PDF format via email.

=== Travel ===
The United States Lighthouse Society organizes several one-to-two-week tours of historic lighthouses year round (domestic and international). Destinations include eastern Michigan, Massachusetts, Maine, the Outer Banks, Long Island, and along the St. Lawrence River. International tours has taken participants all over Europe, South America and Asia.
