= Burke Bay (Washington) =

Bay in Washington

- Interactive map of Burke Bay
- Location: Kitsap County, Washington, Washington, United States
- Coordinates: 47°39′2.38″N 122°37′18.98″W
- Type: Bay
- Basin countries: United States

Burke Bay is a small bay in Kitsap County in Washington state. It is located on the Kitsap Peninsula of Puget Sound, west of Seattle and Bainbridge Island. Nearby communities include Brownsville, Illahee and Keyport. Close towns are Bremerton, Poulsbo and Silverdale. A strong military presence strengthens the county's economy.

The unincorporated community of Brownsville, Washington is located on the north side of Burke Bay.
