= Waterman, Washington =

Unincorporated community in Washington, US

- Unincorporated community
- Location in Washington and the United States Waterman (the United States)
- Coordinates: 47°34′24″N 122°34′50″W
- Country: United States
- State: Washington
- County: Kitsap
- Elevation: 7 ft (2.1 m)
- Time zone: UTC-8 (Pacific (PST))
  - Summer (DST): UTC-7 (PDT)
- GNIS feature ID: 1512780

Waterman is an unincorporated community in Kitsap County, in the U.S. state of Washington.

== History ==
A post office called Waterman was established in 1904, and remained in operation until 1935. The community was named after Delos Waterman, a pioneer settler.
