= Ostrich Bay =

Small bay in Kitsap County, Washington, U.S.

Coordinates: 47.588°N 122.683°W

Ostrich Bay is a small bay in Bremerton on the Kitsap Peninsula in the U.S. state of Washington. Approximately 1.2 miles long and 0.5 miles wide, the bay has a maximum depth of 45 feet. It is connected to Oyster Bay to the south, and Dyes Inlet to the north. On the west side of Ostrich Bay is Jackson Park, a naval housing neighborhood built on the former site of Naval Ammunition Depot Puget Sound. On the east shore of the bay is Marine Drive, a long, narrow stretch of land part of Bremerton. Marine Drive separates Ostrich Bay from the shallow, narrow body of water known as Mud Bay between Marine Drive and Rocky Point. Despite being half a mile wide, the passage to Oyster Bay south of Ostrich Bay is much more narrow due to Madrona Point.

The bay was named by naval captain Charles Wilkes in 1841 during the United States Exploring Expedition, from the shape of Ostrich and Oyster bays combined looking like an ostrich when facing south.

Ostrich Bay has long been monitored for environmental concerns from the Naval Ammunition Depot Puget Sound that once operated on the bay. Between 1904 and 1959, munitions were manufactured, processed, stored, and dismantled. Two piers were operated on Ostrich Bay to transport munitions by barge. The Jackson Park Housing Complex was added to the US Environmental Protection Agency's Superfund list in 1994, including the west shoreline of Ostrich Bay.

N.A.D. Puget Sound has had an environmental effect on Ostrich Bay. During barge transit and loading, many munitions were lost into the bay. In 1981, a survey found 18,000 buried ordinances on the shore of Ostrich Bay. In the summer of 2015 alone, more than 400 fuses were found in Ostrich Bay. During the depot's operation in the 20th century, several sources reported the water occasionally turning yellow from ammonium picrate contamination. As a result of operations from N.A.D. Puget Sound, the Kitsap County Health Department prohibited commercial and recreational harvest of shellfish at Ostrich Bay in 1969.
