= Point No Point =

Point on Kitsap Peninsula, Washington, U.S.

Coordinates: 47°54′43″N 122°31′33″W

Point No Point hadᶻqs (Lushootseed)
- Point
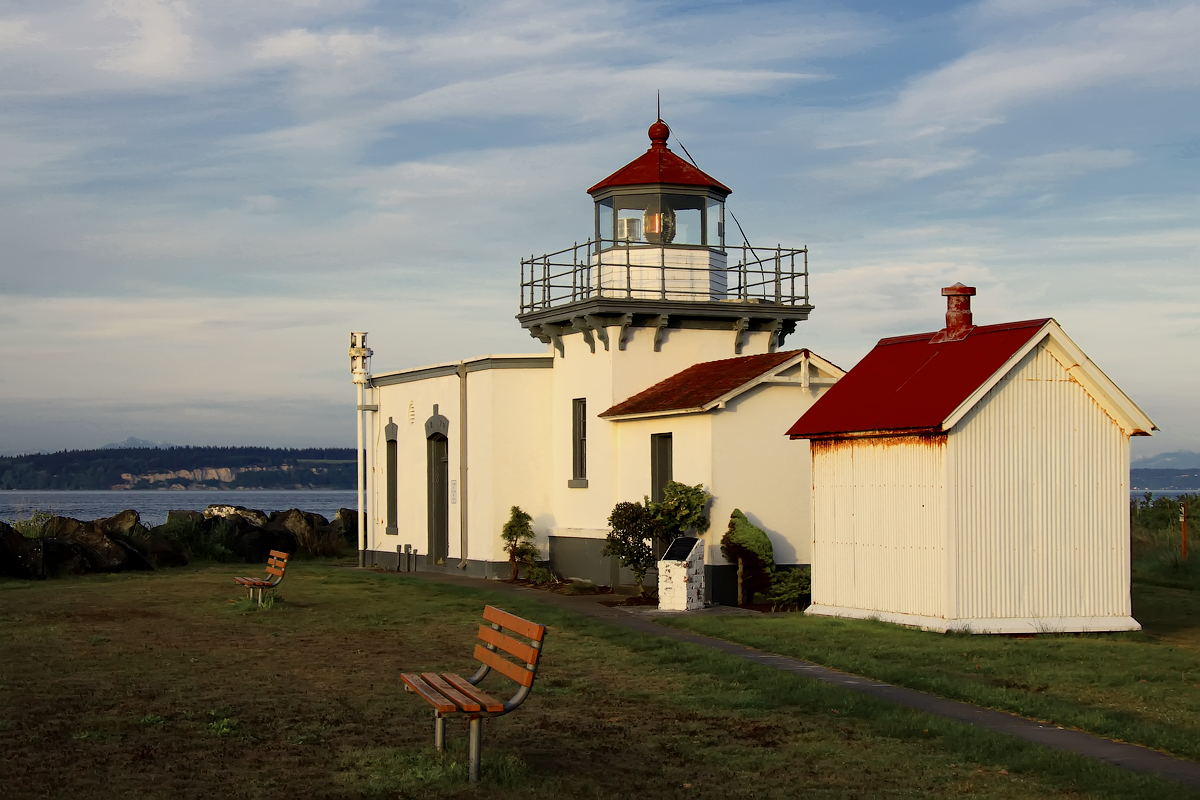
- The lighthouse at Point No Point
- Interactive map of Point No Point
- Location: Kitsap County
- Etymology: Apparent lack of land

Point No Point (Lushootseed: hadᶻqs) is an outcropping of land on the northeast point of the Kitsap Peninsula in Washington, the United States. It was the location of the signing of the Point No Point Treaty and is the site of the Point No Point Light.

The Lushootseed name of the point is hadᶻqs, which means "long point". It was named by Charles Wilkes during the United States Exploring Expedition of Puget Sound in 1841. Wilkes gave the point its name because it appears much less of a promontory at close range than it does from a distance. Point No Point has been noted for its unusual place name.

The marine climate ensures plenty of precipitation in winter and mild temperatures in summer. There are many productive habitats. The spit itself has sandy beaches with log jams, as well as some man-made structures for boating. Behind the beaches is a large mixed freshwater/saltwater marsh with a substantial shrub component. The waters surrounding the point react to swiftly running tides, attracting many marine bird species.

== Birdwatching ==
Point No Point has one of the largest birdlists of any site in Washington. The point is owned jointly by the U.S. Coast Guard (leased to Kitsap County) and a private landowner who is knowledgeable and sympathetic to birdwatchers.

Point No Point is best known for its water-related species: gulls, cormorants, loons, terns, jaegers, ducks, grebes, mergansers, scoters, brant, and alcids. When the tide is running, there are flocks of Bonaparte's gulls and seabirds, often a veritable feeding frenzy. Jaegers are often seen flying through the gull and (in fall) tern flocks. Ancient murrelets can be seen offshore in November – this is one of the best sites in Washington for this species. Along the sandy beaches, shorebirds can be seen. The marsh attracts a variety of passerines, particularly in migration. Point No Point has produced many notable rarities, both in the offshore waters and in the marsh.

== See also ==
- U.S. Geological Survey Geographic Names Information System: Point No Point
