= Camp Yeomalt =

- Camp Major Hopkins
- U.S. National Register of Historic Places
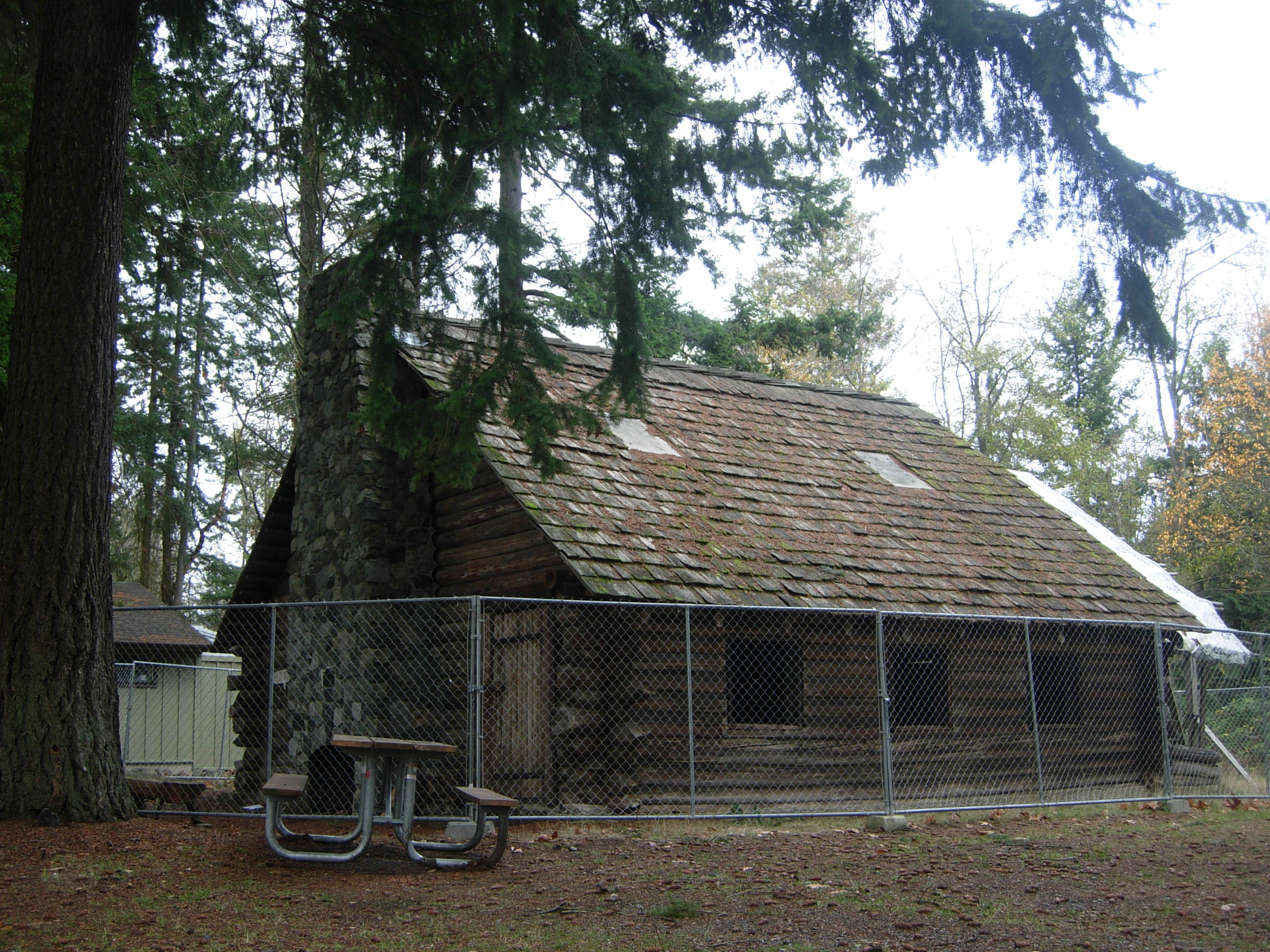

- Location within Washington (state)
- Location: Bainbridge Island, Washington
- Coordinates: 47.63235°N 122.49624°W
- Architect: WPA
- NRHP reference No.: 05001351
- Added to NRHP: November 30, 2005

Camp Yeomalt is a one-story lodge originally built as a Boy Scout camp on Bainbridge Island, Washington. The camp was originally built as Camp Major Hopkins (named for Major Maurice Jayne Hopkins) in 1935 by unemployed island residents, recruited by the Franklin D. Roosevelt's Works Progress Administration. The original lodge was built of Douglas-fir logs, in "camp style" architecture. The western side of the lodge has a stone chimney, with fire boxes on both the interior and exterior sides. The lodge sits on 3 acres (12,000 m^{2}) of land, and is accompanied by a second building that was built in 1942 as an Army bathhouse, when the camp was used as US Army 202nd Coast Artillery Bainbridge Island Headquarters. The Bainbridge Island Park & Recreation District took ownership of the camp in 1987, and renamed it Camp Yeomalt in 2000. The camp was added to the National Register of Historic Places in 2005. The term "Yeomalt" is an anglicization of a Lushootseed word ("Yeboa'lt") meaning "fight".
