= Foulweather Bluff =

Nature preserve in Kitsap Peninsula, Washington, USA

Coordinates: 47°56′22″N 122°36′45″W

Foulweather Bluff Nature Preserve
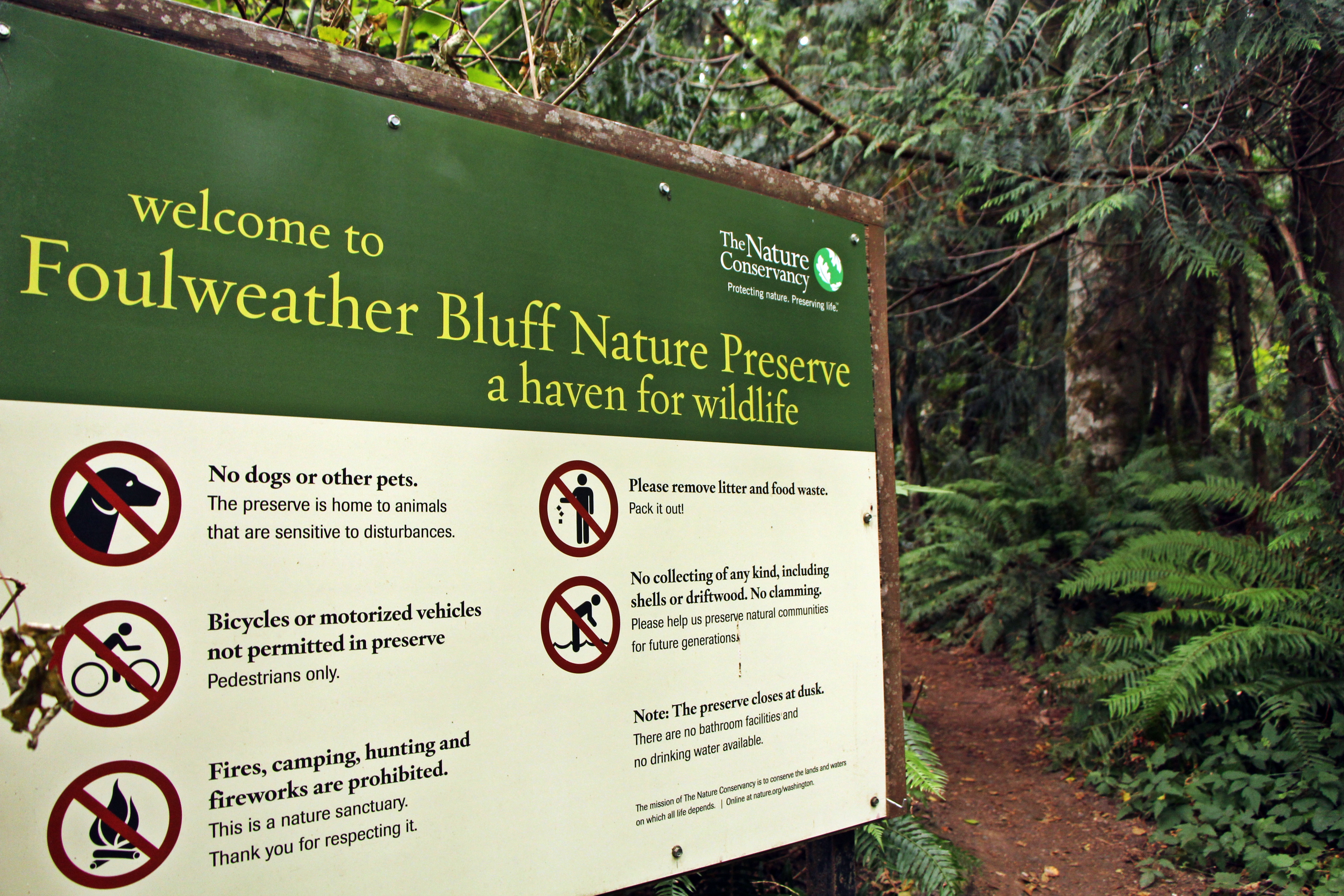
- Interactive map of Foulweather Bluff Nature Preserve
- Nearest city: Poulsbo, Washington
- Area: 40.87 ha (101.0 acres)
- Established: 1967
- Governing body: Nature Conservancy
- Operator: Foulweather Bluff Preserve Committee

Foulweather Bluff is a privately owned protected area and a cliff that lies on the northwest end of the Kitsap Peninsula along Puget Sound, on the east side of the entrance to Hood Canal.

== Landform ==
Foulweather Bluff was named by George Vancouver in 1792, due to the rough weather he experienced there.

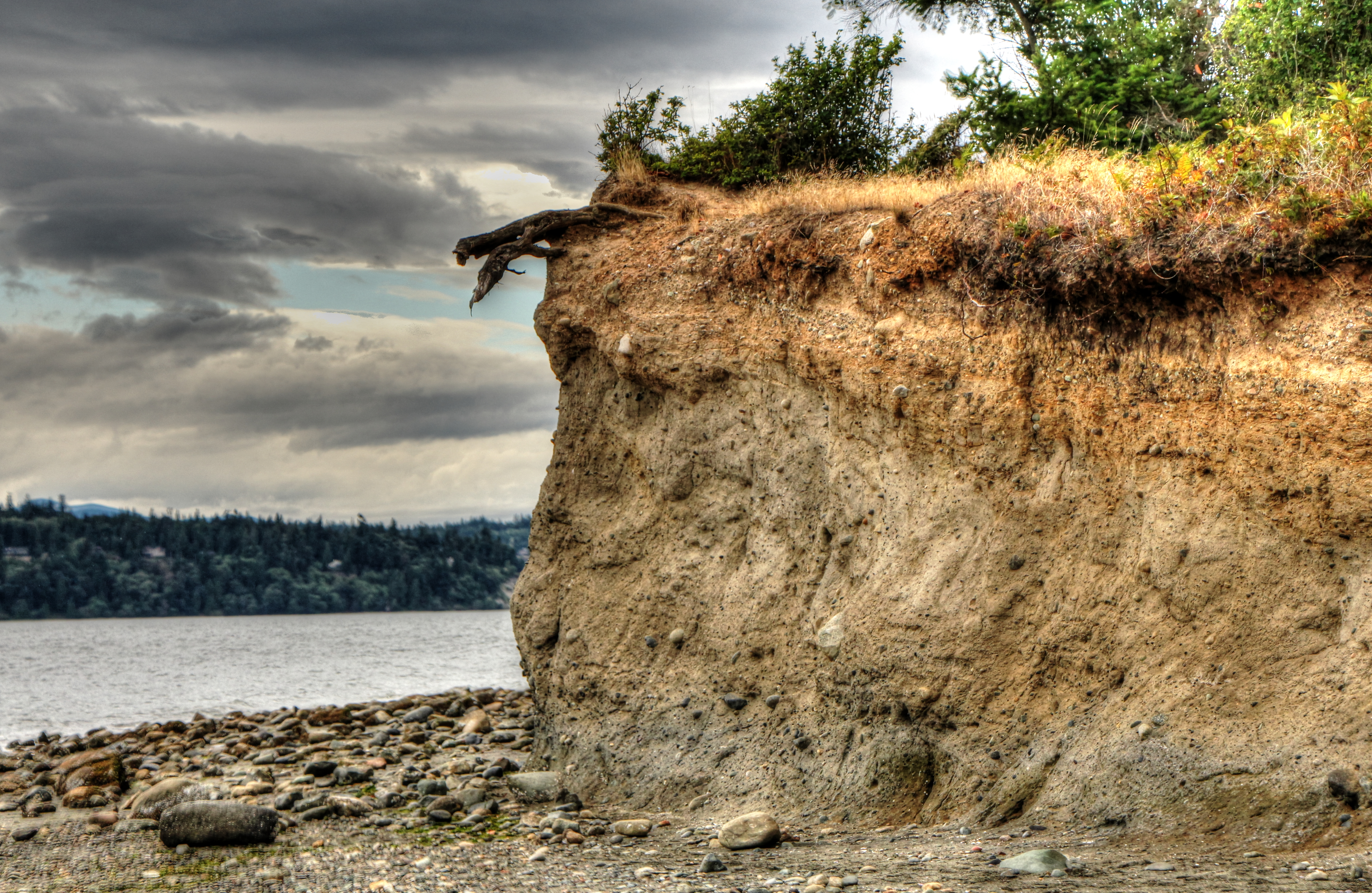
Foulweather Bluff

== Preserve ==
The Foulweather Bluff Nature Preserve was established in 1967 by the Nature Conservancy after the bulk of the land on which it's currently located was donated to the organization by its then owner, Errol Rawson, with smaller allotments contributed by Rawson's neighbors. The preserve consists of the cliff and the beach it overlooks, as well as adjoining marsh and alder and coniferous forest. It shelters a large number of plant and animals species, notably wintering ducks. A trail leads from the nearest road to the beach.

== See also ==
- Hansville, Washington
