= Enetai, Washington =

- Census-designated place
- Location within Washington (state) Location within the United States
- Coordinates: 47°35′19″N 122°36′19″W
- Country: United States
- State: Washington
- County: Kitsap

Area
  - Total: 1.03 sq mi (2.7 km^{2})
- Elevation: 282 ft (86 m)

Population (2020)
  - Total: 2,497
  - Density: 2,420/sq mi (936/km^{2})
- Time zone: Pacific
- ZIP Code: 98310
- Area code(s): 360, 564
- GNIS feature ID: 2411479

Enetai is a census-designated place (CDP) located in Kitsap County, Washington. The population was 2,497 at the 2020 census.

Enetai is a suburb of Bremerton between Manette Park and Illahee State Park. Its major streets are NE Sylvan Way, Trenton Ave, Perry Ave, and Illahee Road NE.

== Demographics ==
Historical population
Census	Pop.	Note	%±
2010	2,286		—
2020	2,497		9.2%
U.S. Decennial Census; 2000 2010

Enetai first appeared as a census designated place in the 2010 U.S. census.

=== Racial and ethnic composition ===
Enetai CDP, Washington – Racial and ethnic composition Note: the US Census treats Hispanic/Latino as an ethnic category. This table excludes Latinos from the racial categories and assigns them to a separate category. Hispanics/Latinos may be of any race.
Race / Ethnicity (NH = Non-Hispanic)	Pop 2010	Pop 2020	% 2010	% 2020
White alone (NH)	1,793	1,818	78.43%	72.81%
Black or African American alone (NH)	87	78	3.81%	3.12%
Native American or Alaska Native alone (NH)	26	20	1.14%	0.80%
Asian alone (NH)	113	102	4.94%	4.08%
Native Hawaiian or Pacific Islander alone (NH)	21	20	0.92%	0.80%
Other race alone (NH)	0	25	0.00%	1.00%
Mixed race or Multiracial (NH)	153	181	6.69%	7.25%
Hispanic or Latino (any race)	93	253	4.07%	10.13%
Total	2,286	2,497	100.00%	100.00%

=== 2020 census ===
In 2020, Enetai has a population of 2,497 inhabitants, an increase of 211 inhabitants since 2010.

== Economy ==
The dominant industry for civilian employment in Enetai is Educational, health care, and social services, with Manufacturing, & Professional, management, administrative, and waste management services following. With the average hours worked hours per week by men at 39.7 hours and the average hours worked per week by women at 40.4 hours.

The Home Ownership rate in Enetai is 78.3%, putting it 14.3% higher than Washington's rate of 64.0%.

== History ==
Enetai was the site of the Southern Lushootseed speaking native Salish peoples, similar to Seattle across the sound. Its name is derived from northwestern native language's term meaning "Across the water"

== Social ==
Enetai is considered suburban.
