= Nellita, Washington =

Unincorporated community in Washington, US

- Unincorporated community
- Location in Washington and the United States Nellita (the United States)
- Coordinates: 47°35′23″N 122°56′07″W
- Country: United States
- State: Washington
- County: Kitsap
- Elevation: 43 ft (13 m)
- Time zone: UTC-8 (Pacific (PST))
  - Summer (DST): UTC-7 (PDT)
- GNIS feature ID: 1528865

Nellita is an unincorporated community in Kitsap County, in the U.S. state of Washington.

== History ==
A post office called Nellita was established in 1900, and remained in operation until 1924. The community was named after Nelli Brueger.
