= Illahee, Washington =

Unincorporated community in Washington, United States

- Unincorporated community
- Location in Washington and the United States Illahee (the United States)
- Coordinates: 47°36′46″N 122°35′48″W
- Country: United States
- State: Washington
- County: Kitsap
- Time zone: UTC-8 (Pacific (PST))
  - Summer (DST): UTC-7 (PDT)
- GNIS feature ID: 1512320

Illahee is an unincorporated community in Kitsap County, Washington, United States, between Bremerton and Silverdale. It is home to Illahee State Park and other local parks. The word "Illahee" means earth or country in the pidgin language Chinuk Wawa, commonly spoken in the area until the early twentieth century.

== Geography ==
Illahee's elevation is 36 feet (11 m).

== Port of Illahee ==
The Port of Illahee community dock was built around 1916 to serve the Puget Sound Mosquito Fleet. In later years this port was used by the United States Navy to demagnetize ships.

=== Ecological status ===
The official shellfish harvesting status of the Port of Illahee is maintained by the National Shellfish Sanitation Program. In addition, environmental contaminants of the surface-water and Mytilus tissues at the Port of Illahee are monitored routinely by local ecology programs. While historical monitoring has reported low concentrations of heavy metals over the past decade (2010-2020), the presence of carcinogenic polycyclic aromatic hydrocarbons (cPAHs) in Mytilus tissues should be considered by recreational and subsistence consumers. PAH concentrations in Puget Sound have been highlighted by the National Oceanic and Atmospheric Administration as being the highest in the nation and cPAH regulatory thresholds for Washington State consumers have been calculated by the Washington State Department of Ecology. The following table provides Washington State cPAH thresholds (current as of 2020) for general fish consumption and available historical tissue burdens at the Port of Illahee.

Concentrations of cPAHs in Mytilus collected from the Port of Illahee (2010-2020)
		POPIPD^{*} cPAHs (ng g^{−1} ww)						
MSL-ID	Collection Year	Benzo(a)anthracene	Chrysene	Benzo(b)fluoranthene	Benzo(k)fluoranthene	Benzo(a)pyrene	Indeno(1,2,3-cd)pyrene	Dibenz(a,h)anthracene
	TEC_{C}^{†}	0.63	63	0.63	6.3	0.063	0.63	0.063
3106-200	2010	5.93	13.8	6.42	2.85	2.13	1.64	ND
3106-788	2012	5.70	8.05	5.59	2.70	1.79	1.56	2.23
3431-7	2014	14.5	35.5	17.0	6.51	3.07	2.16	0.758
3538-6	2016	16.6	22.8	11.9	6.31	4.70	ND	ND
3538-70 to 72	2018	23.9	41.5	27.3	10.6	7.51	4.74	2.82
3538-112	2020	3.03	6.64	2.06	1.96	0.540	ND	ND
^{*}tissue burdens represent composites of three substations, covering the Port Illahee dock structure and pilings (aluminum and creosote)
^{†}TEC_{C}s (tissue exposure concentrations with carcinogenic effects) based on 10^{−6} risk level, 80 kg body weight, and 175 g d^{−1} tissue ingestion

== Parks and recreation ==
75-acre (300,000 m^{2}) Illahee State Park, located north of eastern Bremerton, is part of the Washington State Park System. The waterfront land for the park was acquired between 1934 and 1954. The park offers camping, hiking, a boat launch, and a dock.

The 460-acre (1.9 km^{2}) Illahee Preserve, featuring Illahee Creek, and the 110-acre (0.45 km^{2}) Rolling Hills golf course are both in Illahee as well.
