= Liberty Bay =

Inlet in Washington State

Coordinates: 47.725295°N 122.648449°W

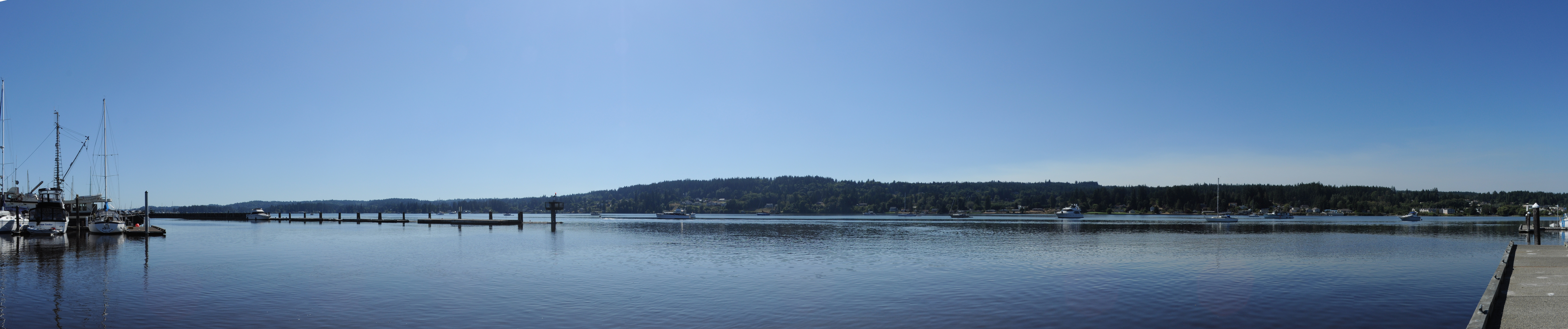
Liberty Bay from Poulsbo, Washington.

Liberty Bay is a narrow inlet extending about 4 miles in a northerly direction from the northwest part of Port Orchard, adjacent to the Kitsap Peninsula in Western Washington.

== Background ==
The southeastern half of Liberty Bay is very narrow. The shores are low and wooded, and the shoreline is sand and gravel. There are mud flats at the head of the bay and in the small bight on the south side of the bay. Mud is the predominant bottom characteristic. Tidal velocities exceed 1 knot at times.

The city of Poulsbo, Washington lies at the north end of the bay.

Variously named Dogfish Bay, Liberty Bay and Poulsbo Bay. According to the Kitsap Peninsula Visitor and Convention Bureau's Web site: "Despite pleas of Poulsbo residents, the Washington State Legislature, in 1893 and 1899, refused to change the official title of Dogfish Bay to Liberty Bay. The present name was adopted through general usage. The original name was a location tie-in to the bayshore plant Harry Drescott operated in the 1860s. It used dogfish oil to grease the logs that made up lumber camp skid roads."

The tanker ship Liberty Bay is the most expensive Jones Act ship as of 2014.
