= Rocky Point, Kitsap County, Washington =

Rocky Point, Washington
- Census-designated place
- Location within Washington (state) Location within the United States
- Coordinates: 47°35′19″N 122°40′02″W
- Country: United States
- State: Washington
- County: Kitsap

Area
  - Total: 0.76 sq mi (1.96 km^{2})
  - Land: 0.75 sq mi (1.93 km^{2})
  - Water: 0.0077 sq mi (0.02 km^{2})
- Elevation: 36 ft (11 m)

Population (2010)
  - Total: 1,564
  - Density: 2,096/sq mi (809.4/km^{2})
- Time zone: Pacific
- Area code: 360
- FIPS code: 53-59390
- GNIS feature ID: 2585030

Rocky Point is a census-designated place (CDP) in Kitsap County, Washington, United States. It is a suburb of Bremerton, Washington.

== Geography ==
Rocky Point is located in central Kitsap County. The CDP occupies a peninsula extending north from the city of Bremerton into the tidal Dyes Inlet, ending at Rocky Point. It is bordered to the east by Port Washington Narrows and Phinney Bay and to the west by Mud Bay, separating it from a parallel peninsula containing Marine Drive.

According to the U.S. Census Bureau, the Rocky Point CDP has a total area of 0.76 square miles (1.96 km^{2}), of which 0.01 square miles (0.02 km^{2}), or 1.26%, are water.

== Demographics ==
Historical population
Census	Pop.	Note	%±
2010	1,564		—
2020	1,615		3.3%
U.S. Decennial Census; 2000 2010

Rocky Point first appeared as a census designated place in the 2010 U.S. census.

=== Racial and ethnic composition ===
Rocky Point CDP, Washington – Racial and ethnic composition Note: the US Census treats Hispanic/Latino as an ethnic category. This table excludes Latinos from the racial categories and assigns them to a separate category. Hispanics/Latinos may be of any race.
Race / Ethnicity (NH = Non-Hispanic)	Pop 2010	Pop 2020	% 2010	% 2020
White alone (NH)	1,364	1,287	87.21%	79.69%
Black or African American alone (NH)	18	19	1.15%	1.18%
Native American or Alaska Native alone (NH)	13	9	0.83%	0.56%
Asian alone (NH)	35	44	2.24%	2.72%
Native Hawaiian or Pacific Islander alone (NH)	4	9	0.26%	0.56%
Other race alone (NH)	4	8	0.26%	0.50%
Mixed race or Multiracial (NH)	72	132	4.60%	8.17%
Hispanic or Latino (any race)	54	107	3.45%	6.63%
Total	1,564	1,615	100.00%	100.00%

=== 2010 census ===
In 2010, it had a population of 1,564 inhabitants, 784 of whom were male, and 780 of whom were female.
