= Hansville, Washington =

- Census-designated place
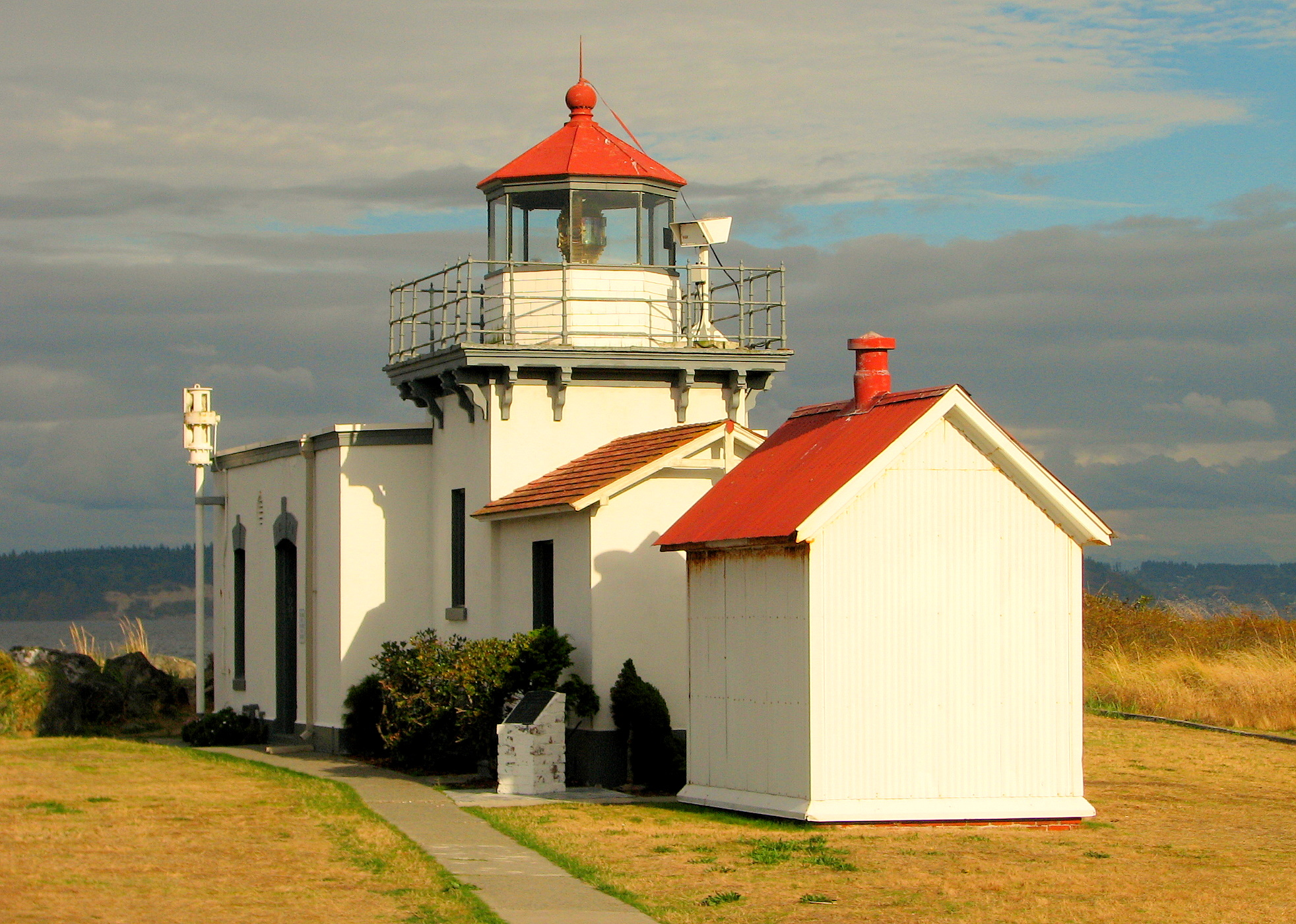
- The Point No Point Light House

- Location in Washington and the United States Hansville (the United States)
- Coordinates: 47°54′50″N 122°33′37″W
- Country: United States
- State: Washington
- County: Kitsap

Area
  - Total: 28.0 sq mi (72.6 km^{2})
  - Land: 10.6 sq mi (27.4 km^{2})
  - Water: 17.4 sq mi (45.1 km^{2})
- Elevation: 141 ft (43 m)

Population (2022)
  - Total: 3,246
  - Density: 292/sq mi (112.6/km^{2})
- Time zone: UTC-8 (Pacific (PST))
  - Summer (DST): UTC-7 (PDT)
- ZIP Code: 98340
- Area code(s): 360, 564
- FIPS code: 53-29430
- GNIS feature ID: 2584979

Hansville is an unincorporated community and census-designated place (CDP) in Kitsap County, Washington, United States. Its population was 3,858 as of the 2020 census. The coastal community is located at the northern end of the Kitsap Peninsula and is about 16 miles (26 km) northeast of Poulsbo, the nearest city.

== History ==
=== 19th century ===
Point No Point was first sighted by a European settler, and given its English name, during the United States Exploring Expedition of Puget Sound in 1841. Expedition leader Charles Wilkes gave the site its name because it appears much less of a promontory at close range than it does from a distance.

On January 25, 1855, Isaac Stevens, the governor of the newly organized Washington Territory, summoned a treaty council to Point No Point, which was attended by 1,200 American Indians of the Chimakum, Klallam, and Skokomish tribes, Point No Point being a central midpoint between the tribal centers. The Point No Point Treaty was signed between the United States and the delegates of the tribes the following day.

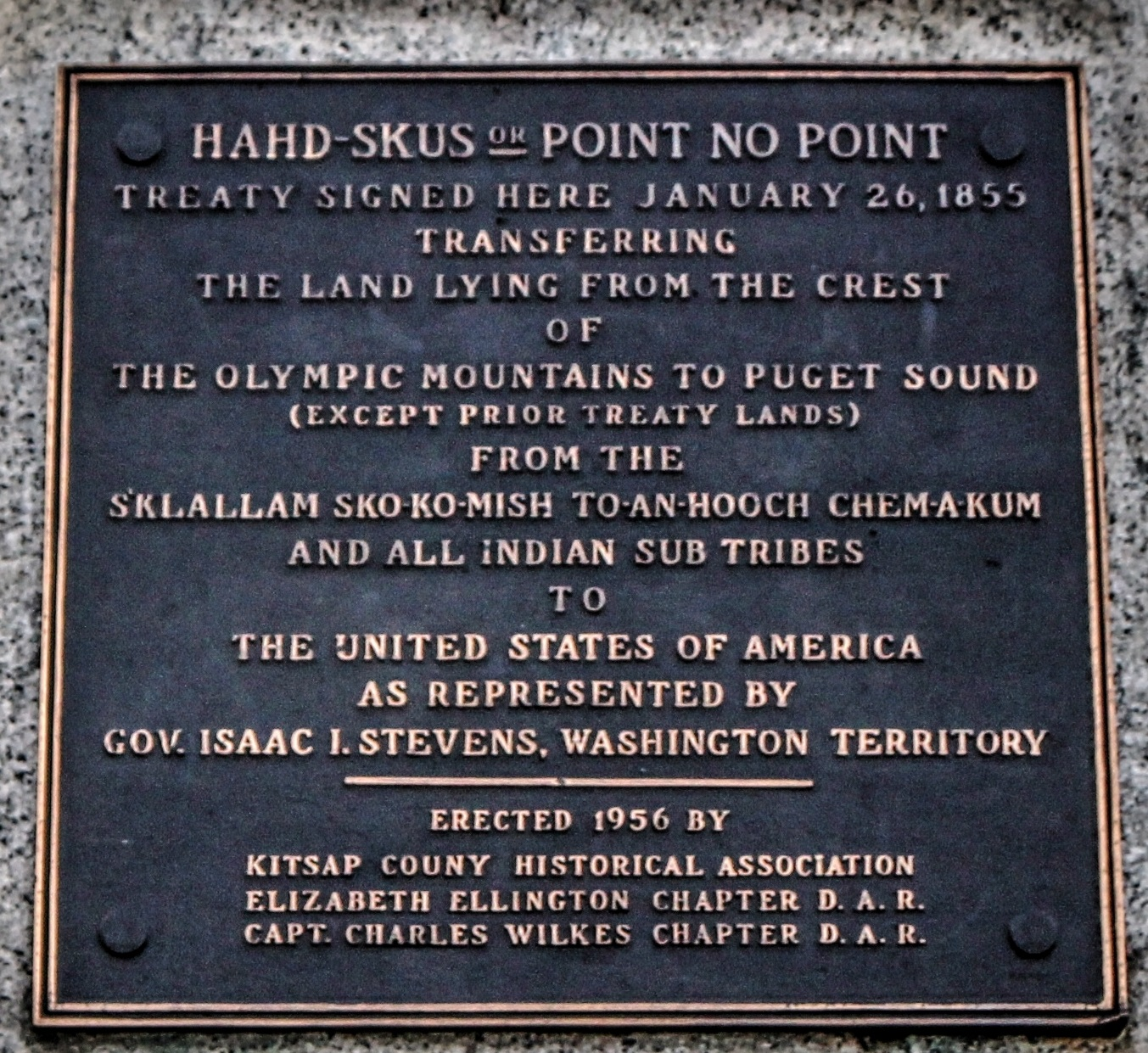
Plaque on the Point No Point Treaty monument in Hansville

The first non-indigenous residents of Hansville were the lightkeepers of the Point No Point Light, which was constructed in 1879. In 1893 a Norwegian fisherman, the community's first permanent settler not affiliated with the lighthouse, came to the area. He was soon followed by other Norwegian emigres, including Hans Zachariasen, for whom Hansville was ultimately named.

=== 20th century ===
In 1900 the Hansville Community Church was founded, with the first permanent structure for the congregation built nine years later. Hansville was connected to Point No Point and its lighthouse by a road constructed in 1908. In 1924 another road was built 10 miles (16 km) south to Kingston, allowing access to the isolated community by means other than boat or trail for the first time. The addition of the road helped develop Hansville into a resort fishing destination, but a decline in the sports fishery in the 1960s led to the closure of the lodges. In 1962 Driftwood Key was platted with 59 lots on the west side of the peninsula, 1.5 miles (2.4 km) southwest of the original settlement of Hansville. By 2008 the homeowner association had grown to become the largest neighborhood in Hansville with 732 properties, approximately one-third of the residential lots in the community.

== Geography ==
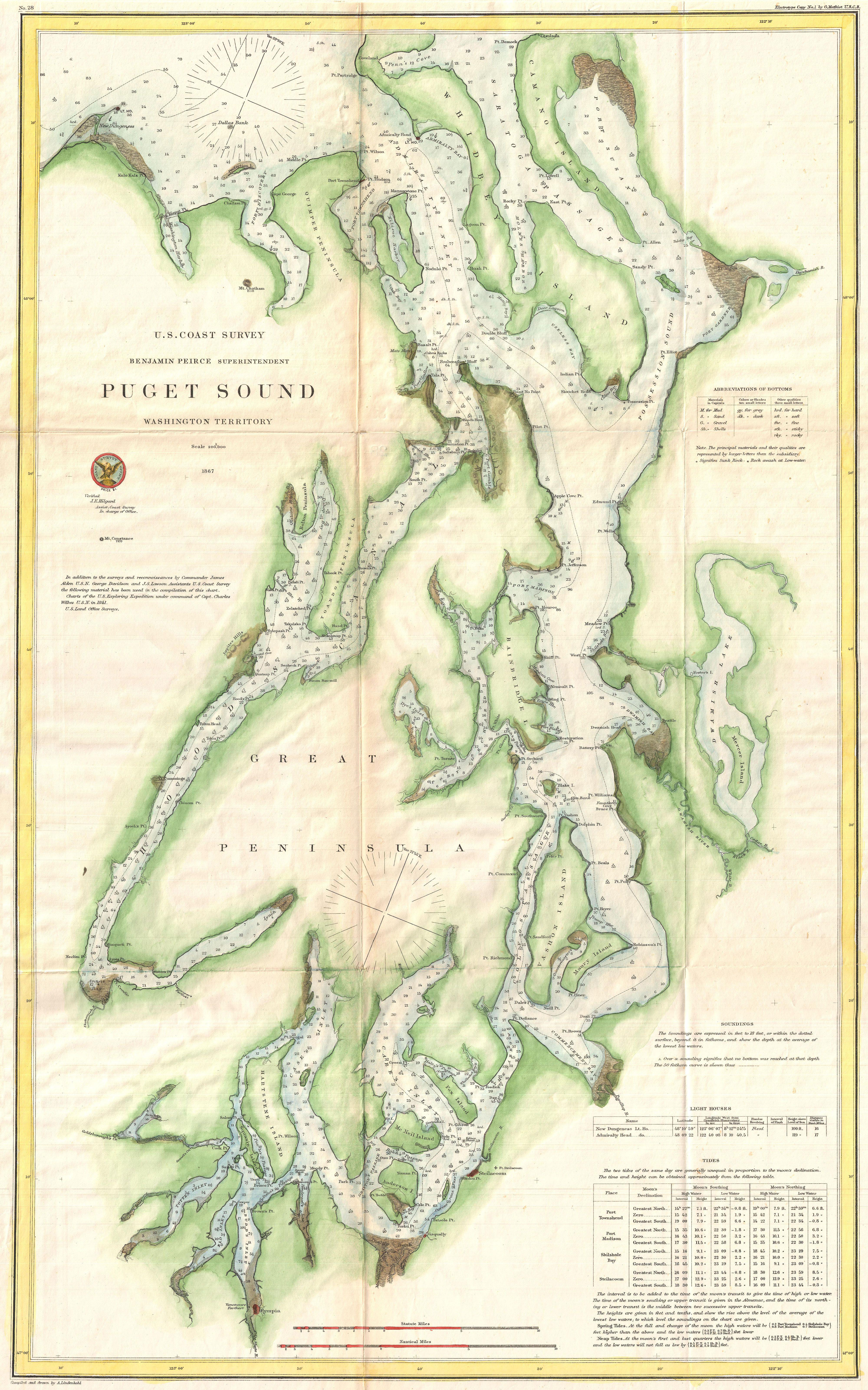
This 1867 U.S. Coast Survey map shows the Kitsap Peninsula, where Hansville is located.

Hansville is situated at the north end of the Kitsap Peninsula, 10 miles (16 km) north of Kingston. On the west side of Hansville lies Hood Canal and Coon Bay. The Foulweather Bluff is a small elevated peninsula at the extreme northwest tip of the Kitsap Peninsula, while Point No Point resides to the east, facing Puget Sound. The Columbia Center in Seattle is distantly visible to the southeast.

The Hansville CDP is bordered to the south by the Port Gamble Tribal Community, to the west across Hood Canal by Jefferson County, and to the northeast across Admiralty Inlet by Whidbey Island in Island County.

== Demographics ==
Historical population
Census	Pop.	Note	%±
2010	3,091		—
2020	3,410		10.3%
U.S. Decennial Census; 2000 2010

Hansville first appeared as a census designated place in the 2010 U.S. census.

=== Racial and ethnic composition ===
Hansville CDP, Washington – Racial and ethnic composition Note: the US Census treats Hispanic/Latino as an ethnic category. This table excludes Latinos from the racial categories and assigns them to a separate category. Hispanics/Latinos may be of any race.
Race / Ethnicity (NH = Non-Hispanic)	Pop 2010	Pop 2020	% 2010	% 2020
White alone (NH)	2,824	2,931	91.36%	85.95%
Black or African American alone (NH)	13	16	0.42%	0.47%
Native American or Alaska Native alone (NH)	42	58	1.36%	1.70%
Asian alone (NH)	42	58	1.36%	1.70%
Native Hawaiian or Pacific Islander alone (NH)	4	6	0.13%	0.18%
Other race alone (NH)	9	13	0.29%	0.38%
Mixed race or Multiracial (NH)	87	163	2.81%	4.78%
Hispanic or Latino (any race)	70	165	2.26%	4.84%
Total	3,091	3,410	100.00%	100.00%

A 2010 survey conducted by Kitsap County found that about 70 percent of residents of Hansville lived in the community full-time, while the remainder maintained homes in the area as weekend or summer properties.

== Parks and recreation ==
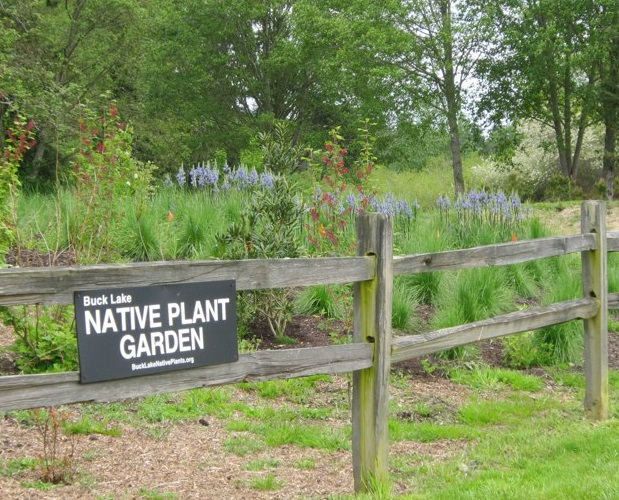
The Buck Lake Native Plant Garden is a demonstration garden that grows more than 100 plants native to the Pacific Northwest.

The three county parks in Hansville are connected by a network of trails created by conservation easements and collectively known as the Hansville Greenway.

=== Buck Lake County Park ===
Buck Lake County Park is a 20-acre (8.1 ha) park that includes the namesake Buck Lake. The park is owned and operated by Kitsap County and is co-located with the Buck Lake Native Plant Garden, a demonstration garden of plants native to coastal Oregon, Washington, and British Columbia that is curated by a private non-profit association. The garden was established in 2006 and includes more than 100 species of flora.

=== Norwegian Point County Park ===
Norwegian Point County Park is a 3-acre (1.2 ha) waterfront park that overlooks Admiralty Inlet and Whidbey Island. It includes a six-sided gazebo. The preserved remnants of one of Hansville's former fishing resorts is located at the site.

=== Point No Point Lighthouse and Park ===
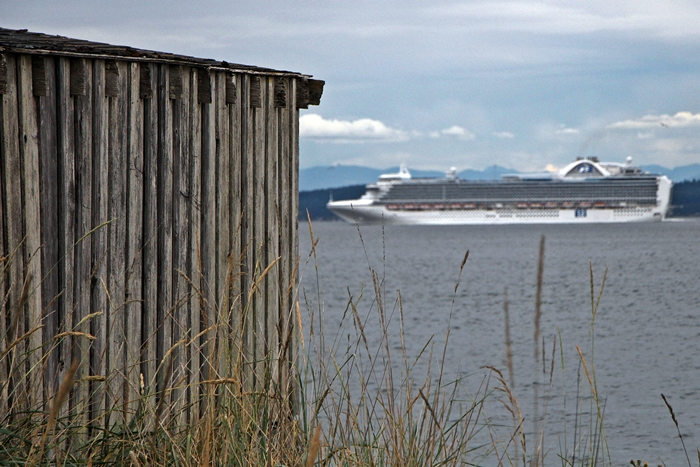
The M/S Crown Princess passes by Norwegian Point in Hansville.

Point No Point Lighthouse and Park, a 60-acre (24 ha) park managed by Kitsap County, includes the historic Point No Point Light, which is operated and maintained by the United States Lighthouse Society. Built in 1879, Point No Point Light is considered the oldest lighthouse on Puget Sound and is listed on the National Register of Historic Places.

== Government ==
=== Administration ===
As an unincorporated, rural area, most local government services are provided by Kitsap County in the absence of a municipal authority. The majority of residences in Hansville are located in one of four homeowner associations: Driftwood Key, Shore Woods, Cliffside, and Point No Point View Estates.

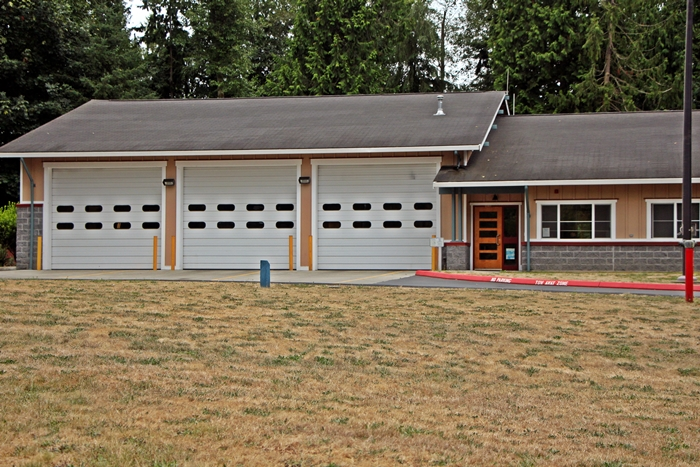
North Kitsap Fire and Rescue station 89 in Hansville

A locally governed fire protection service was established in 1951 with the creation of North Kitsap Fire District 14, which operated as a volunteer fire department until 1989, when it became a mixed department staffed by both volunteer and professional firefighters. In 2000 the fire district was consolidated into North Kitsap Fire and Rescue, which also serves the communities of Kingston, Eglon, Suquamish, and Indianola, with a total area of 47 square miles (120 km^{2}) and approximately 18,000 residents. According to the department, it operates four fire engines, one type 6 wildland fire engine, two basic life support ambulances, one advanced life support ambulance, three water tenders, and one 26-foot rescue boat, divided among four stations, one of which, Station 89, is located in Hansville.

=== Politics ===
Hansville sits entirely within Washington's 6th congressional district and Washington's 23rd legislative district.

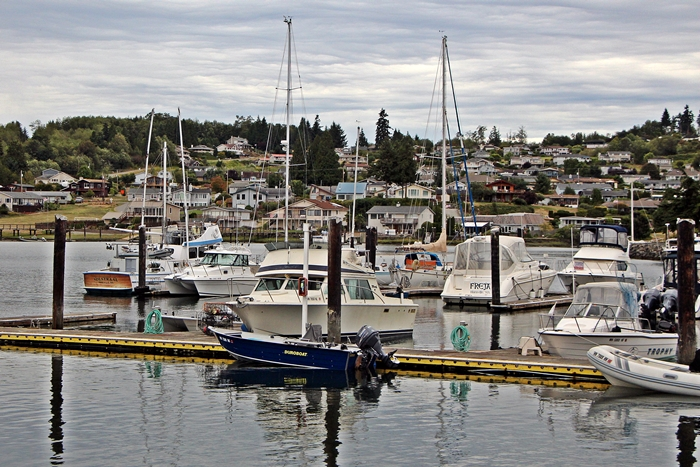
The Driftwood Key Marina in Hansville, August 2015

== Infrastructure ==
Water in Hansville is provided by Kitsap Public Utilities, a special government entity whose boundaries are parallel to those of Kitsap County. Kitsap Public Utilities is governed by a three-member board of commissioners, elected by district. Hansville is part of Kitsap Public Utilities' northern district. Residential electricity is provided by Puget Sound Energy.

== Media ==
The only general media sited in the community is the Hansville Log, a monthly newsletter published by the Greater Hansville Community Center.

The North Kitsap Herald, which was established in 1901 and whose offices are in Poulsbo, is a weekly newspaper that serves Hansville, Suquamish, Kingston, Indianola, Keyport, and Poulsbo. It has a circulation of 12,700. The community is in the delivery area of two daily newspapers: the Kitsap Sun and the Seattle Times. For television broadcasting, Hansville is located in the Seattle-Tacoma designated market area.

== Notable people ==
- Allan "Whitey" Snyder, theatrical make-up artist
- Jim Warren, electronic privacy activist
