= Kitsap County, Washington =

County in Washington, United States

- County
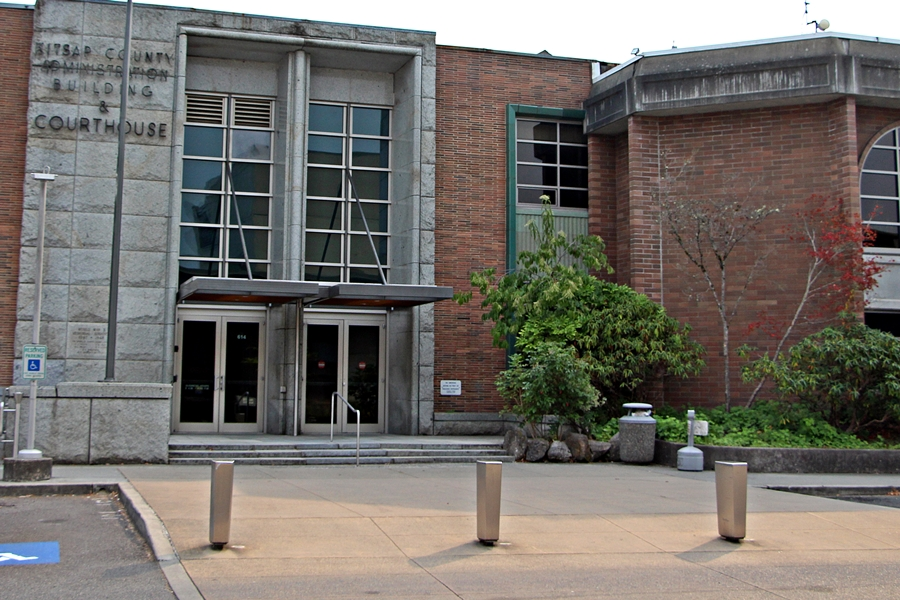
- Kitsap County Courthouse

- Location within the U.S. state of Washington
- Coordinates: 47.64°N 122.65°W
- Country: United States
- State: Washington
- Founded: January 16, 1857
- Named for: Chief Kitsap
- Seat: Port Orchard
- Largest city: Bremerton

Area
  - Total: 566 sq mi (1,470 km^{2})
  - Land: 395 sq mi (1,020 km^{2})
  - Water: 171 sq mi (440 km^{2}) 30%

Population (2020)
  - Total: 275,611
  - Estimate (2025): 283,374 ▲
  - Density: 644/sq mi (249/km^{2})
- Time zone: UTC−8 (Pacific)
  - Summer (DST): UTC−7 (PDT)
- Congressional district: 6th
- Website: https://www.kitsap.gov/

Kitsap County is a county in the U.S. state of Washington. As of the 2020 census, its population was 275,611. Its county seat is Port Orchard; its largest city is Bremerton. The county, formed out of King County and Jefferson County on January 16, 1857, is named for Chief Kitsap of the Suquamish Tribe. Originally named Slaughter County, it was soon renamed.

Kitsap County comprises the Bremerton–Silverdale–Port Orchard, WA Metropolitan Statistical Area, which is also included in the Seattle–Tacoma, WA Combined Statistical Area.

The United States Navy is the largest employer in the county, with installations at Puget Sound Naval Shipyard, Naval Undersea Warfare Center Keyport, and Naval Base Kitsap (which comprises former NSB Bangor and NS Bremerton).

Kitsap County is connected to the eastern shore of Puget Sound by Washington State Ferries routes, including the Seattle-Bremerton Ferry, Southworth to West Seattle via Vashon Island, Bainbridge Island to Downtown Seattle, and from Kingston to Edmonds, Washington. Kitsap Transit provides passenger-only fast ferry service between Bremerton and Seattle, Kingston and Seattle, and Southworth and Seattle.

== History ==
The Kitsap Peninsula was originally acquired by the U.S. Government in three pieces by three treaties negotiated with the Native American tribes:

- The Treaty of Medicine Creek, signed December 26, 1854, ratified March 3, 1855
- The Treaty of Point Elliott, signed January 22, 1855, ratified April 11, 1859
- Point No Point Treaty, signed January 26, 1855, ratified March 8, 1859.

Territorial Governor Isaac Stevens represented the United States in all three negotiations.

When the Washington Territory was organized in 1853, the Kitsap Peninsula was divided between King County to the east and Jefferson County to the west. Official public papers were required to be filed at the county seat, which meant Peninsula business people had to travel to either Seattle or Port Townsend to transact business. On the understanding that they would "bring home a new county," area mill operators George Meigs and William Renton supported the candidacies to the Territorial Legislature of two employees from their respective mills: Timothy Duane Hinckley from Meigs' and S.B. Wilson from Renton's.

Upon arrival in Olympia, the two men introduced bills to create a new county, to be named "Madison". Representative Abernathy from Wahkiakum County proposed an amendment to name it "Slaughter", in recognition of Lt. William Alloway Slaughter, who had been killed in 1855 in the Yakima War. The bill passed as amended. It was signed by Governor Isaac Stevens on January 16, 1857. The county seat would be located in Meigs's mill town at Port Madison.

In Slaughter County's first election on July 13, 1857, voters were given the opportunity to rename the county. The options were "Mill", "Madison" or "Kitsap". Slaughter was not one of the options. Kitsap won by an overwhelming majority.

Kitsap County is home to several major United States Navy facilities, collectively named Naval Base Kitsap, and grew in response to wars and conflicts in the 20th century. Bremerton, the site of the Puget Sound Naval Shipyard, peaked at 80,000 residents during World War II. Naval Submarine Base Bangor was developed in the 1980s to store nuclear weapons for submarines and contributed to the county's population growth during the decade from 147,000 to 190,000.

== Geography ==
According to the United States Census Bureau, the county has a total area of 566 square miles (1,470 km^{2}), of which 395 square miles (1,020 km^{2}) is land and 171 square miles (440 km^{2}) (30%) is water. It is the fourth-smallest county in Washington by land area and third-smallest by total area.

In addition to occupying most of the Kitsap Peninsula, the county includes both Bainbridge Island and Blake Island. Kitsap County has approximately 250 miles (400 km) of shoreline.

The portion of the county north of Silverdale is often referred to as North Kitsap, and the portion south of Bremerton as South Kitsap.

=== Geographic features ===
- Bainbridge Island
- Blake Island
- Buck Lake
- Colvos Passage
- Dyes Inlet
- Hood Canal
- Kitsap Peninsula
- Liberty Bay
- Port Gamble
- Port Madison
- Port Orchard
- Puget Sound
- Sinclair Inlet
- Blue Hills
- Seattle Fault Zone
- Kitsap Lake
- Ostrich Bay
- Horseshoe Lake

=== Adjacent counties ===
- Island County - northeast
- Snohomish County - east
- King County - east/southeast
- Pierce County - south/southeast
- Mason County - southwest
- Jefferson County - northwest

=== Notable parks ===
- Blake Island Marine State Park, 1,127 acres (456 ha)
- Bloedel Reserve
- Camp Yeomalt
- Eagledale Park
- Fay Bainbridge Park
- Fort Ward Park
- Illahee State Park
- Kitsap Memorial State Park
- Manchester State Park
- Port Gamble Forest Heritage Park, 3,493 acres (1,414 ha)
- Pritchard Park
- Scenic Beach State Park

== Economy ==
The largest employer in Kitsap County is Naval Base Kitsap, which had a total of 38,187 workers in 2024; approximately 63 percent are civilian employees, while the rest are military personnel. According to 2025 statistics from the Washington State Employment Security Department, 22.9 percent of the labor force in Kitsap County are employed by the federal government—the highest rate among Washington's counties. Other major employers include St. Michael Medical Center in Silverdale, local school districts, the county government, and Olympic College.

== Demographics ==
Historical population
Census	Pop.	Note	%±
1860	544		—
1870	866		59.2%
1880	1,738		100.7%
1890	4,624		166.1%
1900	6,767		46.3%
1910	17,647		160.8%
1920	33,162		87.9%
1930	30,776		−7.2%
1940	44,387		44.2%
1950	75,724		70.6%
1960	84,176		11.2%
1970	101,732		20.9%
1980	147,152		44.6%
1990	189,731		28.9%
2000	231,969		22.3%
2010	251,133		8.3%
2020	275,611		9.7%
2025 (est.)	283,374	▲	2.8%
U.S. Decennial Census; 1790–1960 1900–1990; 1990–2000 2010–2020

=== 2020 census ===
As of the 2020 census, there were 275,611 people, 105,803 households, and 71,548 families living in the county. Of the residents, 20.3% were under the age of 18 and 19.0% were 65 years of age or older; the median age was 39.8 years. For every 100 females there were 102.4 males, and for every 100 females age 18 and over there were 101.9 males. 82.4% of residents lived in urban areas and 17.6% lived in rural areas.

Kitsap County, Washington – Racial and ethnic composition Note: the US Census treats Hispanic/Latino as an ethnic category. This table excludes Latinos from the racial categories and assigns them to a separate category. Hispanics/Latinos may be of any race.
Race / Ethnicity (NH = Non-Hispanic)	Pop 2000	Pop 2010	Pop 2020	% 2000	% 2010	% 2020
White alone (NH)	190,751	198,745	199,020	82.23%	79.14%	72.21%
Black or African American alone (NH)	6,495	6,329	7,338	2.80%	2.52%	2.66%
Native American or Alaska Native alone (NH)	3,462	3,524	3,491	1.49%	1.40%	1.27%
Asian alone (NH)	10,034	12,082	14,015	4.33%	4.81%	5.08%
Pacific Islander alone (NH)	1,699	2,177	2,814	0.73%	0.87%	1.02%
Other race alone (NH)	647	423	1,782	0.28%	0.17%	0.65%
Mixed race or Multiracial (NH)	9,272	12,167	22,967	4.00%	4.84%	8.33%
Hispanic or Latino (any race)	9,609	15,686	24,184	4.14%	6.25%	8.77%
Total	231,969	251,133	275,611	100.00%	100.00%	100.00%

The racial makeup of the county was 74.9% White, 2.8% Black or African American, 1.6% American Indian and Alaska Native, 5.2% Asian, 2.9% from some other race, and 11.5% from two or more races. Hispanic or Latino residents of any race comprised 8.8% of the population.

There were 105,803 households in the county, of which 28.3% had children under the age of 18 living with them and 22.4% had a female householder with no spouse or partner present. About 24.8% of all households were made up of individuals and 11.1% had someone living alone who was 65 years of age or older.

There were 113,248 housing units, of which 6.6% were vacant. Among occupied housing units, 69.3% were owner-occupied and 30.7% were renter-occupied. The homeowner vacancy rate was 1.0% and the rental vacancy rate was 6.0%.

=== 2010 census ===
As of the 2010 census, there were 251,133 people, 97,220 households, and 65,820 families residing in the county. The population density was 635.9 inhabitants per square mile (245.5/km^{2}). There were 107,367 housing units at an average density of 271.9 per square mile (105.0/km^{2}). The racial makeup of the county was 82.6% white, 4.9% Asian, 2.6% black or African American, 1.6% American Indian, 0.9% Pacific islander, 1.6% from other races, and 5.8% from two or more races. Those of Hispanic or Latino origin made up 6.2% of the population. In terms of ancestry, 21.3% were German, 14.4% were Irish, 13.8% were English, 7.1% were Norwegian, and 4.2% were American.

Of the 97,220 households, 31.7% had children under the age of 18 living with them, 53.2% were married couples living together, 10.2% had a female householder with no husband present, 32.3% were non-families, and 25.2% of all households were made up of individuals. The average household size was 2.49 and the average family size was 2.97. The median age was 39.4 years.

The median income for a household in the county was $59,549 and the median income for a family was $71,065. Males had a median income of $52,282 versus $38,499 for females. The per capita income for the county was $29,755. About 6.1% of families and 9.4% of the population were below the poverty line, including 11.8% of those under age 18 and 5.3% of those age 65 or over.

== Communities ==
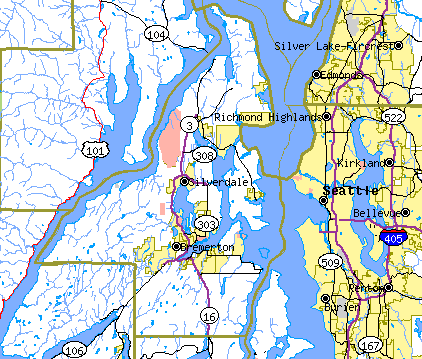
Map of Kitsap County and surrounding area

=== Cities ===
- Bainbridge Island
- Bremerton
- Port Orchard (county seat)
- Poulsbo

=== Census-designated places ===
- Bangor Base
- Bethel
- Burley
- Chico
- East Port Orchard
- Enetai
- Erlands Point
- Gorst
- Hansville
- Indianola
- Keyport
- Kingston
- Kitsap Lake
- Lofall
- Manchester
- Navy Yard City
- Parkwood
- Port Gamble Tribal Community
- Rocky Point
- Seabeck
- Silverdale
- Southworth
- Suquamish
- Tracyton

=== Other unincorporated communities ===
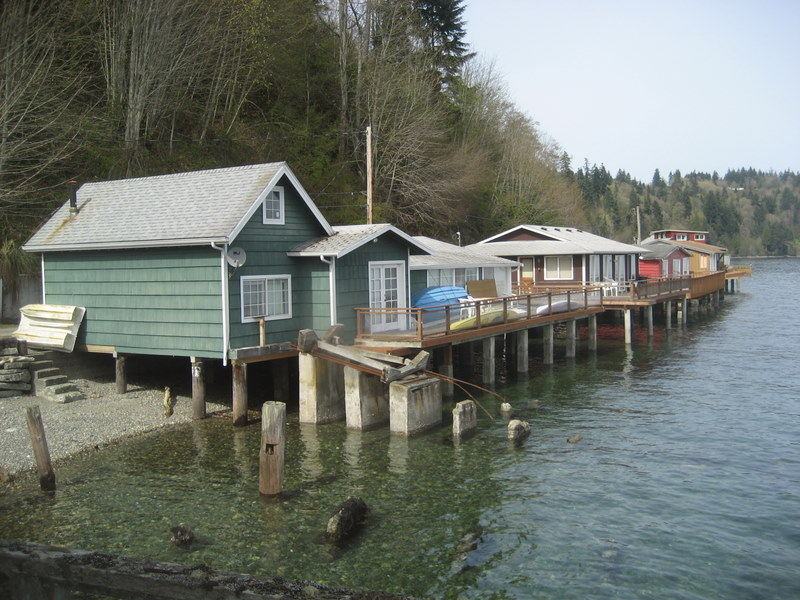
Beach cottages in Fragaria along Colvos Passage in Kitsap County

- Annapolis
- Bay Vista
- Breidablick
- Brownsville
- Camp Union
- Central Valley
- Clear Creek
- Crosby
- Eglon
- Fernwood
- Fragaria
- Gilberton
- Glenwood
- Harper
- Holly
- Horseshoe Lake
- Illahee
- Island Lake
- Kariotis
- Lofall
- Lone Rock
- Long Lake
- Nellita
- Olalla
- Olalla Valley
- Port Gamble
- Scandia
- South Colby
- South Park Village
- Twin Spits
- Virginia
- Waterman
- Wautauga Beach
- Wildcat Lake
- Wye Lake

== Politics ==
Kitsap County is generally considered to be a relatively Democratic area, owing to progressivism stemmed from the county's Scandinavian settlers. In the 2016 U.S. presidential election, Democrat Hillary Clinton received 49.0% of the vote to Republican Donald Trump's 38.1%. This Democratic margin widened in 2020, with candidate Joe Biden receiving 56.9% of the vote versus incumbent Trump receiving 38.8%. The Democratic margin widened ever further in 2024, with Kamala Harris receiving 58.5% of the vote compared with Trump's 37.7%, the largest margin of victory for a presidential candidate in the county since Lyndon B. Johnson in 1964.

On mainland Kitsap County, politics are strongly influenced by working-class Bremerton, which casts moderate margins for Democratic candidates. Unincorporated Kitsap County is a mix of battleground areas. Non-Bremerton parts of incorporated mainland Kitsap County vary, with Silverdale having become a Republican stronghold, Poulsbo marginally Democratic, and Port Orchard consistently electing Republican candidates; however, all three communities voted for both Biden and Harris, marking a sustained shift to the left.

Democrats typically carry the Indian reservations of the area by wide margins; the area around Little Boston (part of the S'Klallam Indian Reservation) regularly votes for Democratic candidates.

The Kitsap County Auditor website has detailed election results from 1998 to the present. County area political trends can be tracked by analyzing the election precinct data.

United States presidential election results for Kitsap County, Washington
Year	Republican		Democratic		Third party(ies)	
Year	No.	%	No.	%	No.	%
1892	438	34.60%	370	29.23%	458	36.18%
1896	728	48.89%	728	48.89%	33	2.22%
1900	880	58.43%	489	32.47%	137	9.10%
1904	1,736	69.19%	320	12.75%	453	18.06%
1908	1,819	56.12%	850	26.23%	572	17.65%
1912	1,224	20.12%	969	15.93%	3,889	63.94%
1916	2,638	37.83%	3,479	49.89%	857	12.29%
1920	4,989	49.41%	1,350	13.37%	3,759	37.23%
1924	3,954	45.19%	490	5.60%	4,306	49.21%
1928	6,544	62.97%	3,668	35.30%	180	1.73%
1932	3,465	24.45%	10,002	70.57%	706	4.98%
1936	3,440	21.04%	12,414	75.94%	493	3.02%
1940	5,525	28.19%	13,861	70.73%	210	1.07%
1944	11,224	31.62%	24,016	67.67%	251	0.71%
1948	9,869	32.17%	19,538	63.69%	1,271	4.14%
1952	16,876	44.89%	20,531	54.61%	189	0.50%
1956	17,986	47.73%	19,641	52.12%	58	0.15%
1960	17,459	46.80%	19,662	52.71%	181	0.49%
1964	10,702	28.38%	26,904	71.34%	108	0.29%
1968	14,520	36.47%	22,273	55.94%	3,022	7.59%
1972	25,831	56.84%	17,011	37.43%	2,604	5.73%
1976	23,124	45.56%	25,701	50.64%	1,925	3.79%
1980	29,420	48.79%	20,893	34.65%	9,983	16.56%
1984	36,101	54.11%	29,681	44.49%	931	1.40%
1988	34,743	49.88%	33,748	48.45%	1,158	1.66%
1992	29,340	33.13%	34,442	38.89%	24,786	27.99%
1996	35,304	38.59%	44,167	48.28%	12,016	13.13%
2000	46,427	45.25%	50,302	49.03%	5,867	5.72%
2004	55,608	46.95%	60,796	51.32%	2,049	1.73%
2008	53,297	42.86%	68,624	55.19%	2,416	1.94%
2012	52,846	42.84%	67,277	54.53%	3,244	2.63%
2016	49,018	38.07%	63,156	49.05%	16,596	12.89%
2020	61,563	38.80%	90,277	56.90%	6,832	4.31%
2024	59,080	37.66%	91,731	58.48%	6,061	3.86%

== Government ==
=== Board of County Commissioners ===
- District 1 (North Kitsap): Christine Rolfes, Democrat; appointed 2023. Elected in 2024
- District 2 (South Kitsap): Oran Root, Republican; elected in 2024
- District 3 (Central Kitsap): Katie Walters, Democrat; elected in 2022

=== State legislators ===
==== 23rd Legislative District ====
Bainbridge Island, East Bremerton, Poulsbo and Silverdale

- Sen. Drew Hansen (D) - Appointed August 2023 to replace Christine Rolfes who had been appointed to Board of County Commissioners. Elected November 2024.
- Rep. Tarra Simmons (D) - First elected November 2020.
- Rep. Greg Nance (D) - Appointed September 2023 to replace Drew Hansen, who had left to fill vacant senate seat. Elected November 2024.

==== 26th Legislative District ====
Bremerton, Gig Harbor and Port Orchard

- Sen. Deborah Krishnadasan (D) - Appointed December 2024 to replace Emily Randall who had been elected to the U.S. House of Representatives.
- Rep. Adison Richards (D) - Elected November 2024.
- Rep. Michelle Caldier (R)

==== 35th Legislative District ====
Bremerton, Shelton and Mason County

- Sen. Drew MacEwan (R)
- Rep. Dan Griffey (R)
- Rep. Travis Couture (R)

== Education ==
=== Post-secondary education ===
- Olympic College

=== Public schools ===
- Bainbridge Island School District
- Bremerton School District
- Central Kitsap School District
- North Kitsap School District
- South Kitsap School District

== Transportation ==
Kitsap County is connected to the eastern shore of Puget Sound by several Washington State Ferries routes, including the Seattle-Bremerton Ferry, Southworth to West Seattle via Vashon Island, Bainbridge Island to Downtown Seattle, and from Kingston to Edmonds, Washington.

Kitsap Transit provides local transit service within Kitsap County and connects to other transit systems that continue onto the Olympic Peninsula. The agency launched its fast ferry services to Seattle in July 2017, beginning initially with a Bremerton route and later expanding to Kingston in 2018. Fast ferry service to Southworth is expected to begin in 2020.

The county is connected to Jefferson County and the Olympic Peninsula to the west by the Hood Canal Bridge.

A 48-mile-long (77 km) government-owned rail line, the Bangor-Shelton-Bremerton Navy Railroad, runs through the county. It is a branch off the Puget Sound and Pacific Railroad, with its junction at Shelton. At the Bremerton Junction near Gorst a spur follows Highway 3 along the shore of the Sinclair Inlet terminating at the Puget Sound Naval Ship Yard, the other follows Highway 3 along the western shore of Dyes Inlet, servicing Bangor Naval Submarine Base. The Navy had originally intended to use armored trains to transport nuclear missiles to Bangor for the Trident submarines but protesters and a series of court decisions derailed the plan. Today the railroad is primarily used to transport scrap from PSNS.

== Notable people ==
- Tarn Adams — programmer and game designer, creator of Dwarf Fortress and other games
- Nathan Adrian — swimmer and Olympic gold medalist
- Dove Cameron — actress, singer
- Ben Gibbard — musician
- Richard F. Gordon Jr. — naval officer and aviator, test pilot, and NASA astronaut
- Russell Johnson — actor, best known as The Professor on TV's Gilligan's Island
- James Kelsey — sculptor
- Debbie Macomber — best-selling romance novelist
- Gregg Olsen — best-selling mystery/crime novelist
- Benji Olson — NFL player for Tennessee Titans
- Delilah Rene — radio personality, author and songwriter
- Bree Schaaf — 2010 Winter Olympics competitor in bobsled
- Aaron Sele — former all-star MLB pitcher
- Ben Shepherd — bass player of Seattle rock band Soundgarden
- Scott Shipley — slalom canoeist
- Marvin Williams — NBA player for the Atlanta Hawks
- Andrew Wood — lead singer of Seattle rock band Mother Love Bone

== In popular culture ==
Walking Tall with The Rock and Johnny Knoxville was based in Kitsap County, and the City of Port Orchard is the basis for the fictional community of Cedar Cove in the books by Debbie Macomber.

== See also ==
- National Register of Historic Places listings in Kitsap County, Washington
