= Port Orchard =

Strait in Washington, U.S.

Coordinates: 47.642261°N 122.586823°W

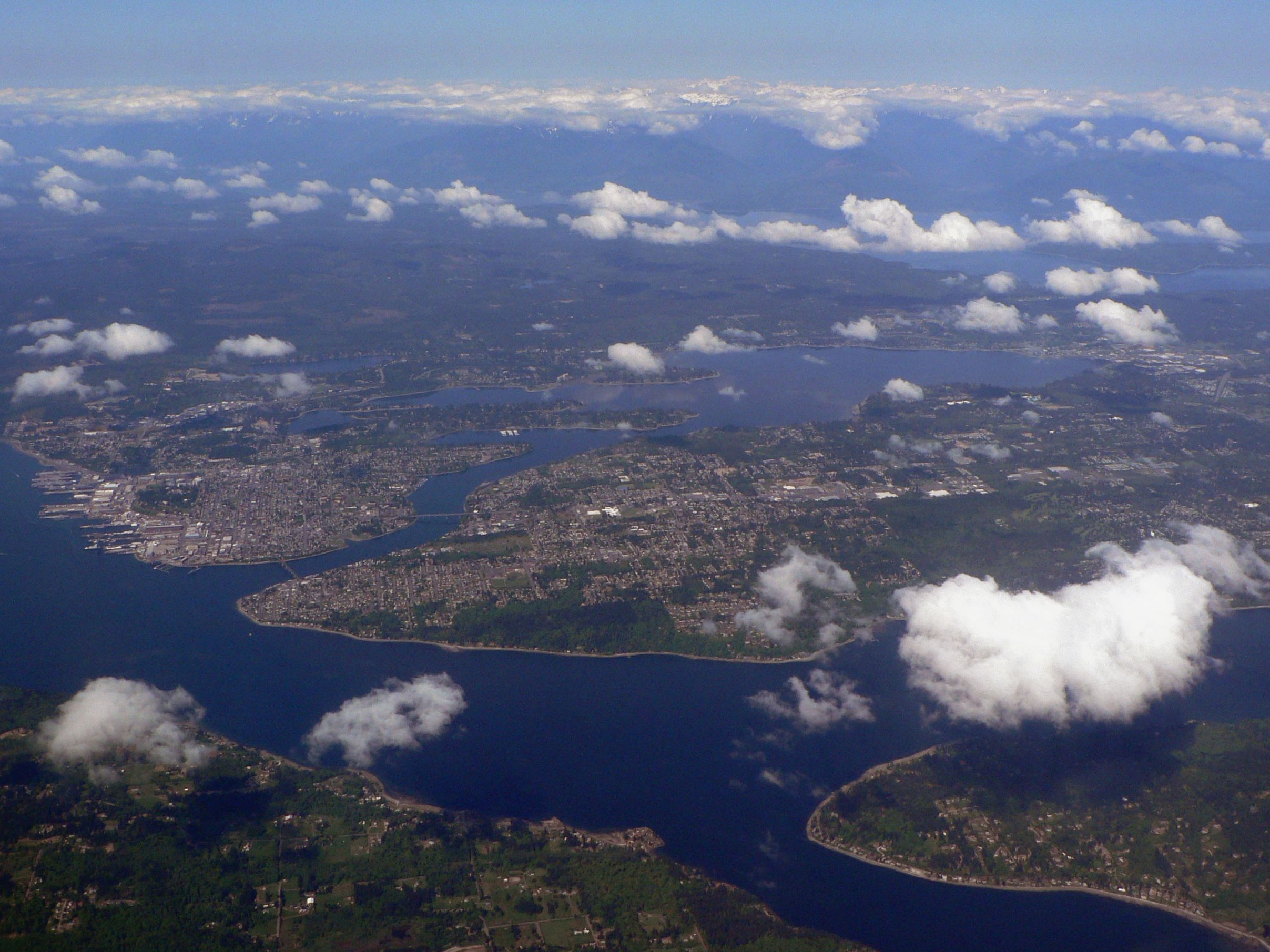
Sinclair Inlet and Port Washington (left) and Rich Passage (lower right) branch from Port Orchard (lower center and right)

Port Orchard, part of Washington state's Puget Sound, is the strait that separates Bainbridge Island on the east from the Kitsap Peninsula on the west. It extends from Liberty Bay and Agate Pass in the north to Sinclair Inlet and Rich Passage in the south. It was named in May 1792 by George Vancouver after Harry Masterman Orchard, ship's clerk of Vancouver's ship Discovery.
