= List of Truman Scholars =

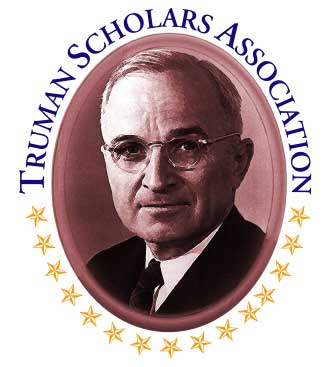

The Harry S. Truman Scholarship is a highly selective graduate fellowship in the United States for public service leadership. Created as a memorial to Harry S Truman, it is awarded annually to between 50 and 60 students in their third year of undergraduate studies. Many notable individuals have received the fellowship.

== 1970s ==
- Janet Napolitano (1977), Governor of Arizona, 2003–2009, Secretary of Homeland Security under President Barack Obama, 2009–2013, President of the University of California, 2013–2020

== 1980s ==
- Stephen Censky (1980), United States Deputy Secretary of Agriculture.
- Robert Pape (1980), American political scientist and founder of the Chicago Project on Security and Threats
- Jeffrey Toobin (1980), former senior legal analyst for CNN and staff writer at The New Yorker
- Bill de Blasio (1981), New York City Mayor
- Bill Halter (1981), former Lieutenant Governor of Arkansas and U.S. Senate candidate
- George Stephanopoulos (1981), former political adviser to Bill Clinton, current Chief Anchor for ABC News
- Andra Samoa (1982), CEO of American Samoa Power Authority
- Thomas Sugrue (1982), professor of history and sociology at New York University
- G. Murray Snow (1982), federal judge for the United States District Court for the District of Arizona.
- Chris Coons (1983), U.S. Senator for Delaware
- Russ Dallen (1983), Editor-in-chief of the Latin American Herald Tribune, and previously the Daily Journal
- Dan Gelber, Florida State Senator and Florida Attorney General Candidate.
- Luis Ubiñas (1983), former President of the Ford Foundation
- J. Paul Compton Jr. (1984), General Counsel, United States Department of Housing and Urban Development
- Lisa Cook (1984), American economist elected to the board of the Federal Reserve Bank of Chicago and member of the Board of Governors at the Federal Reserve System
- Carolyn N. Lerner (1984), Judge, United States Court of Federal Claims
- William W. Mercer (1984), United States Attorney for Montana
- Daniel H. Pink (1984), author of A Whole New Mind; former chief speech writer for Vice President Gore
- Susan E. Rice (1984), 24th National Security Advisor; U.S. Ambassador to the United Nations; former Assistant Secretary of State
- Wayne W. Williams (1985), Colorado Secretary of State
- Tom Malinowski (1985), United States Representative, New Jersey's 7th congressional district
- Liz Magill (1986), Dean of Georgetown University Law Center
- Ted Deutch (1986), member of U.S. House of Representatives from Florida's 19th congressional district, former Democratic member of the Florida State Senate
- Mark Lemley (1986), Professor of Law, Stanford Law School
- Michelle Alexander (1987), Associate Professor, Ohio State University, civil rights advocate and writer
- Kurt Alme (1987), U.S. Senator-elect for Montana
- Neil Gorsuch (1987), Associate Justice of the Supreme Court of the United States
- Lucy Koh (1988), United States circuit judge on the United States Court of Appeals for the Ninth Circuit
- Eric Liu (1988), writer and civil servant who worked in the Clinton and Obama administrations
- Mary Ellen Callahan (1988), American lawyer, former Assistant Secretary for the Department of Homeland Security Office of Countering Weapons of Mass Destruction
- Brad Lander (1989), Member of the New York City Council, representing the 39th Council District in Brooklyn
- George Herbert Walker IV (1989), CEO of Neuberger Berman
- Jason Saul (1989), CEO of Mission Measurement, Lecturer of Social Enterprise at Kellogg School of Management
- Mary Pattillo (1989), Professor of sociology and African American Studies at Northwestern University

== 1990s ==
- Noah Feldman (1990), Professor of Law, Harvard Law School
- Wendy Hensel (1990), President, University of Hawai'i
- Lisette Nieves (1990), President, Fund for the City of New York
- Steve Simon (1990), Minnesota Secretary of State
- Greg Stanton (1990), Member of the U.S. House of Representatives from Arizona
- Tomiko Brown-Nagin (1991), American lawyer, historian, and academic administrator; professor of Constitutional Law at Harvard Law School
- Andrew Rich (1991), political science and president of Franklin & Marshall College
- Mark Sandy (1991), Deputy Associate Director for National Security, Office of Management and Budget, Executive office of the President, Washington, D.C.
- Deborah Archer (1992), civil rights lawyer, associate dean at New York University School of Law
- Rich Constable (1993), former assistant U.S. attorney, Commissioner of the N.J. Department of Community Affairs
- Rachel Paulose (1993), United States Attorney for Minnesota
- Kris Mayes (1993), 27th Attorney General of Arizona
- Stacey Abrams (1994), Georgia House Minority Leader, 84th district
- Hannah Beech (1994), journalist and The New York Times Southeast Asia Bureau Chief
- William J. Dobson (1994), journalist and author of The Dictator's Learning Curve.
- Amy Finkelstein (1994), MacArthur Fellow and Professor in Economics, Massachusetts Institute of Technology
- Heather Mizeur (1994), former member of the Maryland House of Delegates and 2022 candidate for Maryland's 1st Congressional District
- Anjan Mukherjee (1994), former Counselor to the Secretary of the U.S. Treasury
- Cara H. Drinan (1995), professor of law at The Catholic University of America's Columbus School of Law
- John Cranley (1995), Cincinnati City Councilmember
- Michelle Gavin (1995), former ambassador to Botswana
- Eric Greitens (1995), 56th Governor of Missouri (2017–2018), Founder of The Mission Continues
- Darci Vetter (1995), former Chief Agricultural Negotiator at USTR, former Deputy Under Secretary for Farm and Foreign Agricultural Services at USDA, former International Trade Advisor at Senate Finance Committee
- Dayne Walling (1995), Mayor of Flint, Michigan
- Jake Zimmerman (1995), Missouri State Representative, 83rd district
- John King Jr. (1995), 10th United States Secretary of Education
- Nicholas Thompson (1996), Editor-in-Chief of Wired
- Phil Carter (1996), Former Deputy Assistant Secretary of Defense for Detainee Affairs
- Corine Hegland (1996), writer, The National Journal, 2006 James Aronson Award for Social Justice Journalism
- Terry Babcock-Lumish (1996), current Executive Secretary of the Truman Foundation
- Maryana Iskander (1996), CEO of the Wikimedia Foundation
- Jedediah Purdy (1996), author and Professor, Duke University School of Law
- Brendan Johnson (1997), U.S. Attorney for the District of South Dakota
- Noam Scheiber (1997), reporter on Labor and the Workplace for The New York Times
- Jake Sullivan (1997), United States National Security Advisor
- Leonardo Martinez-Diaz (1998), Deputy Assistant Secretary at United States Department of Treasury, former Fellow and deputy director at Brookings Institution
- Maria J. Stephan (1998), political scientist and former director of the program on non-violent action at the United States Institute for Peace
- Martina Vandenberg (1998), lawyer and human trafficking activist
- Dusty Johnson (1998), former chief of staff to Governor Dennis Daugaard and chairman of the South Dakota Public Utilities Commission, current member of the United States House of Representatives from South Dakota
- Kymberly K. Evanson (1998), United States District Judge for the Western District of Washington

== 2000s ==
- Seth Bodnar (2000), political candidate and former president of the University of Montana
- Sara Bronin (2000), legal scholar, architect, and former chair of the Advisory Council on Historic Preservation
- Marcia Chatelain (2000), Pulitzer Prize-winning historian, professor of history and African American studies at Georgetown University, and creator of the Ferguson Syllabus
- David Haskell (editor) (2000), Editor-in-Chief of New York Magazine; Co-founder of Kings County Distillery
- Jon Favreau (2002), President Barack Obama's Director of Speechwriting, co-founder of Crooked Media
- Cyrus Habib (2002), 16th Lieutenant Governor of Washington
- Heidi Williams (2002), MacArthur Fellow and Professor in Economics, Massachusetts Institute of Technology
- Andy Kim (2003), U.S. Senator from New Jersey and former National Security Council adviser to President Barack Obama
- Tony Venhuizen (2004), lieutenant governor of South Dakota
- Ryan Quarles (2005), Agriculture Commissioner of Kentucky, 2016–present, Kentucky State Representative from District 62, 2011–2016
- Rob Sand (2005), Iowa Governor-elect, State Auditor, 2019-present
- Te-Ping Chen (2006), American journalist and author
- Kesha Ram (2007), majority leader of the Vermont Senate
- Warwick Sabin (2007), Member Arkansas House of Representatives
- Emily Calandrelli (2008), Host and producer for Xploration Station
- Gabe Amo (2009), Member of the U.S. House of Representatives from Rhode Island
- Matt Gress (2009), member of the Arizona House of Representatives
- Miles Taylor (2009), American government official and New York Times best-selling author

== 2010s ==
- Grant Hauschild (2010), Minnesota State Senator
- Greg Nance (2010), member of the Washington House of Representatives, CEO of Dyad.com, and Founder of Moneythink
- Michael Tubbs (2011), Former Mayor of Stockton
- Andrew J. Lewis (2011), Seattle City Council
- Alex Bores (2012), member of the New York State Assembly
- Zach Brown (2012), former member of the Montana House of Representatives
- Jacob Tobia (2013), LGBT rights activist, writer, producer, and actor
- Zach Wahls (2013), Iowa State Senator
- Rana Abdelhamid (2014), Queens-based political candidate and activist
- Oscar De Los Santos (2014), member of the Arizona House of Representatives
- Mussab Ali (2017), Former President of the Jersey City Board of Education
- David Shimer (2017), American historian and foreign policy analyst
- Jaz Brisack (2018), a founding labor organizer in the Starbucks Workers United unionization campaign
