= Frances Haddon Morgan =

American politician (1909–1993)

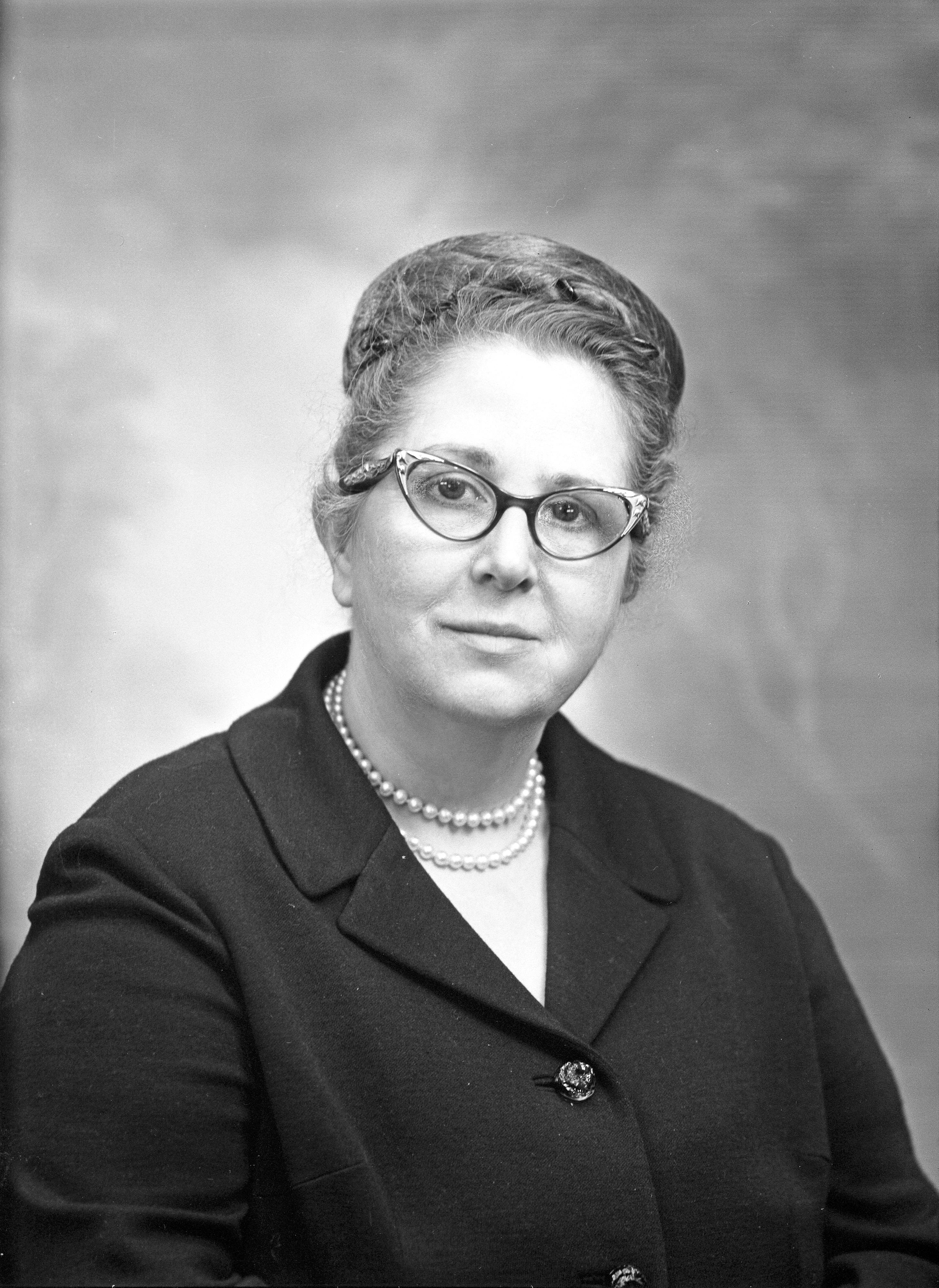
- Haddon in 1965

Member of the Washington Senate from the 23rd district
- In office 1960–1968
- Preceded by: Ralph Purvis
- Succeeded by: Gordon Walgren

Member of the Washington House of Representatives from the 23rd district
- In office 1958–1960 Serving with Pat Nicholson; Arnold S. Wang
- Preceded by: Clifford W. Beck

Personal details
- Born: Frances Haddon; 1909 Bremerton, Washington, U.S.
- Died: 1993 (aged 83–84)
- Party: Democratic

Frances Haddon Morgan (1909 – July 30, 1993) was an American politician in the state of Washington. A Democrat, she was a member of the Washington House of Representatives for the 23rd district between 1958 and 1960 and a member of the Washington State Senate for the 23rd district between 1960 and 1968.

== Early life ==
Haddon was born in 1909 in Bremerton, Washington. Her parents were Lulu Haddon, a state legislator, and James C. Haddon, a grocer who owned Haddon's Grocery. She had three brothers: Lawrence, Joseph Elbert and James Jr. Haddon attended business college and worked as an advertising agent before running a welcoming service. She was married to Osmore H. Morgan, a mail carrier, and had two children. In 1957, she was a member of the governor's council for children and youth.

== Political career ==
Haddon was first elected to the Washington House of Representatives in the 1958 general election, to represent the 23rd district as a Democrat. She was the vice chair of the state institutions and youth control committee. In 1959, she co-sponsored legislation to create a new government department for children and youth. She stayed in the lower chamber of the legislature for one term, before being elected to the Washington State Senate in the 1960 general election to represent the 23rd district, beating the incumbent Ralph Purvis. During her time in the legislature, she advocated for children with disabilities, including establishing the Lakeland Village in Spokane and Olympic Peninsula Enterprises.

With her second election, Haddon became the first woman to have held the same seats in both chambers of the Washington state legislature as her mother. She was sworn in to the senate at the opening of the 37th legislature on January 10, 1961, the only female senator and the first woman to serve since Lady Willie Forbus in 1947, at a ceremony attended by her mother. She was chair of the medicine and dentistry committee in the 1961 legislative session, chair of the public institutions committee in the 1963, 1965 and 1967 legislative sessions. In 1963, she introduced legislation alongside John Stender to prevent psychological testing of students without parental consent. Haddon held her seat in the senate until the 1968 elections, when she lost in the Democratic primary to Gordon Walgren.

== Death and legacy ==
Haddon died on July 30, 1993, in her home in Bremerton at the age of 83. She was described in 1988 by local reporter Adele Ferguson as "the indomitable, intractable, unstoppable, often maddening and always good-hearted 'Aunt Franny'". The Frances Haddon Morgan Center was established in Bremerton in 1972, to house children with autism and later adults with disabilities, although it was abandoned in the 2010s and was torn down in 2022.
