= Lulu Haddon =

American politician (1881–1964)

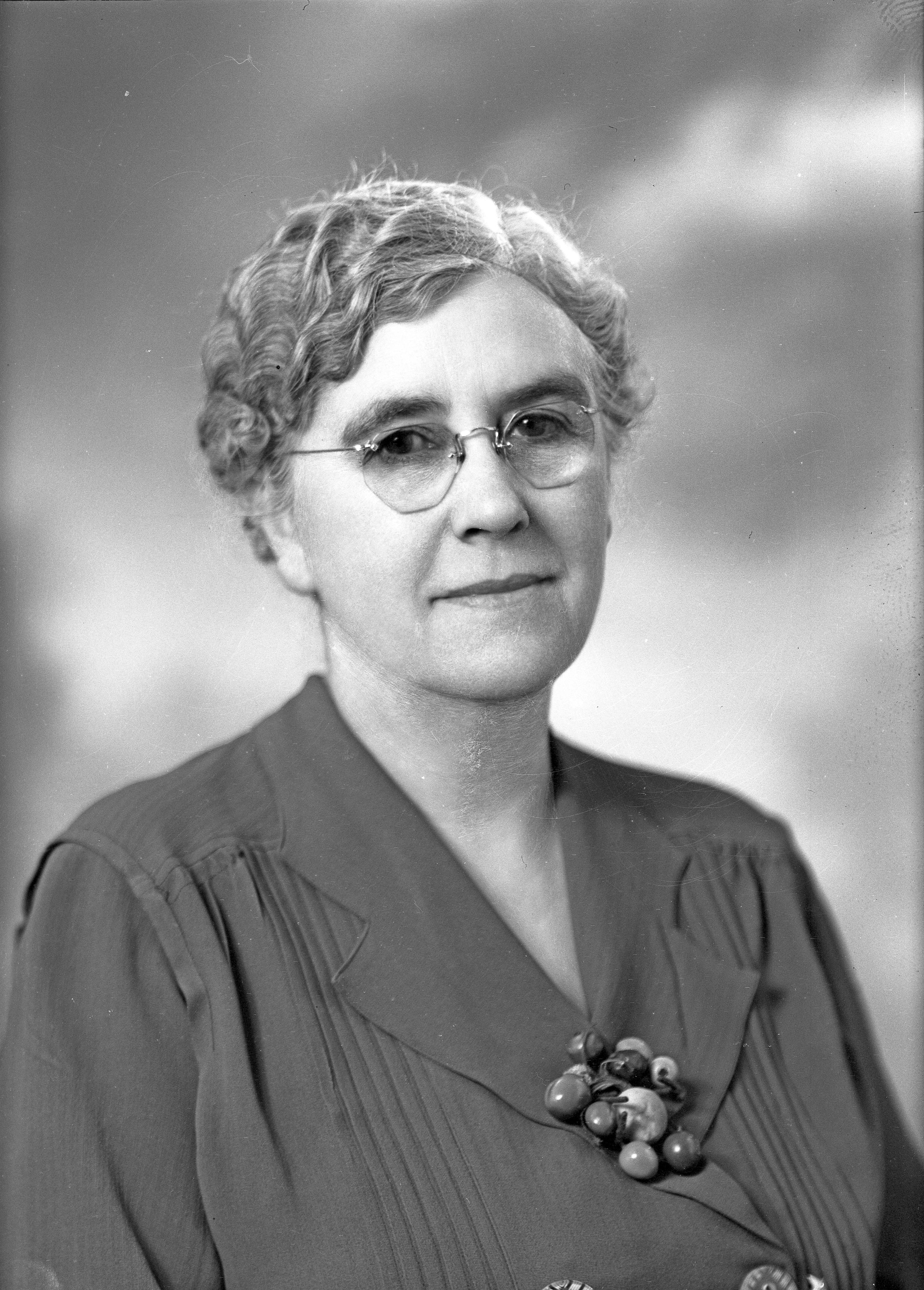
- Haddon in 1937

Member of the Washington Senate from the 23rd district
- In office 1937–1942
- Succeeded by: Gertrude L. Johnson

Member of the Washington House of Representatives from the 23rd district
- In office 1933–1937

Personal details
- Born: Lulu Davis; May 10, 1881 Ankeny, Iowa, U.S.
- Died: June 20, 1964 (aged 83) Bremerton, Washington, U.S.
- Party: Democratic

Lulu Haddon (née Davis; May 10, 1881 – June 20, 1964) was an American politician in the state of Washington. She was involved in civic activities in Bremerton, serving on the Bremerton School Board and as president of the local chapter of the League of Women Voters. She served in the Washington House of Representatives for the 23rd legislative district between 1933 and 1937 for the Democratic Party. She then was elected to the Washington State Senate in 1936, serving between 1937 and 1942. She was the Bremerton finance commissioner, during which time she was involved in setting up Olympic College. Her daughter, Frances Haddon Morgan, would later represent the same district in both the house and senate.

== Early life ==
Haddon was born Lulu Davis in May 10, 1881, in Ankeny, Iowa. She was one of eleven children. Her family moved to Spangle, Washington, when she was six. Her mother had attended college and she taught the children from home, although she received less than an eighth grade education. When she was eighteen, Haddon was invited to move in with her uncle, Francis A. Harlow, the mayor of Bremerton. She began working at C. P. Kimball's General Store after moving in with her aunt and uncle, where she met her future husband, James C. Haddon. The couple married on December 24, 1903. Her husband was in the grocery business, opening his own shop called Haddon's Grocery. The couple had four children: Lawrence, Joseph Elbert, Frances and James Jr.

Her family were Republican when she was growing up, but Haddon joined the Democratic Party when she married James. She became involved in civic activities, with a particular focus on public education. She founded a local chapter of the Soroptimist Club. She served 14 years on the Bremerton School Board, helped found the Bremerton School District Parent Teacher Association, served on the board of trustees for the Bremerton Library and acted as the president of the local chapter of the League of Women Voters.

== Political career ==
A number of local Democrats asked James in 1932 to run for office in the Washington House of Representatives, but he recommended they ask Haddon. She accepted and won the election to represent the 23rd legislative district in the same year. She was quickly appointed as chair of the educational institutions committee and served on the education committee, the state penal and reformatory institutions committee, and the medicine, dentistry, pure foods and drugs committee. She had a particular interest in unemployment, which had been exacerbated by the Great Depression, and worked closely with the chair of the unemployment relief committee, fellow representative Warren Magnuson. During her first term, she sponsored a bill which was signed into law by Governor Clarence D. Martin to improve the "vocational rehabilitation and education of disabled persons". Haddon was re-elected in the 1934 general election and retained her position as chair of the educational institutions committee.

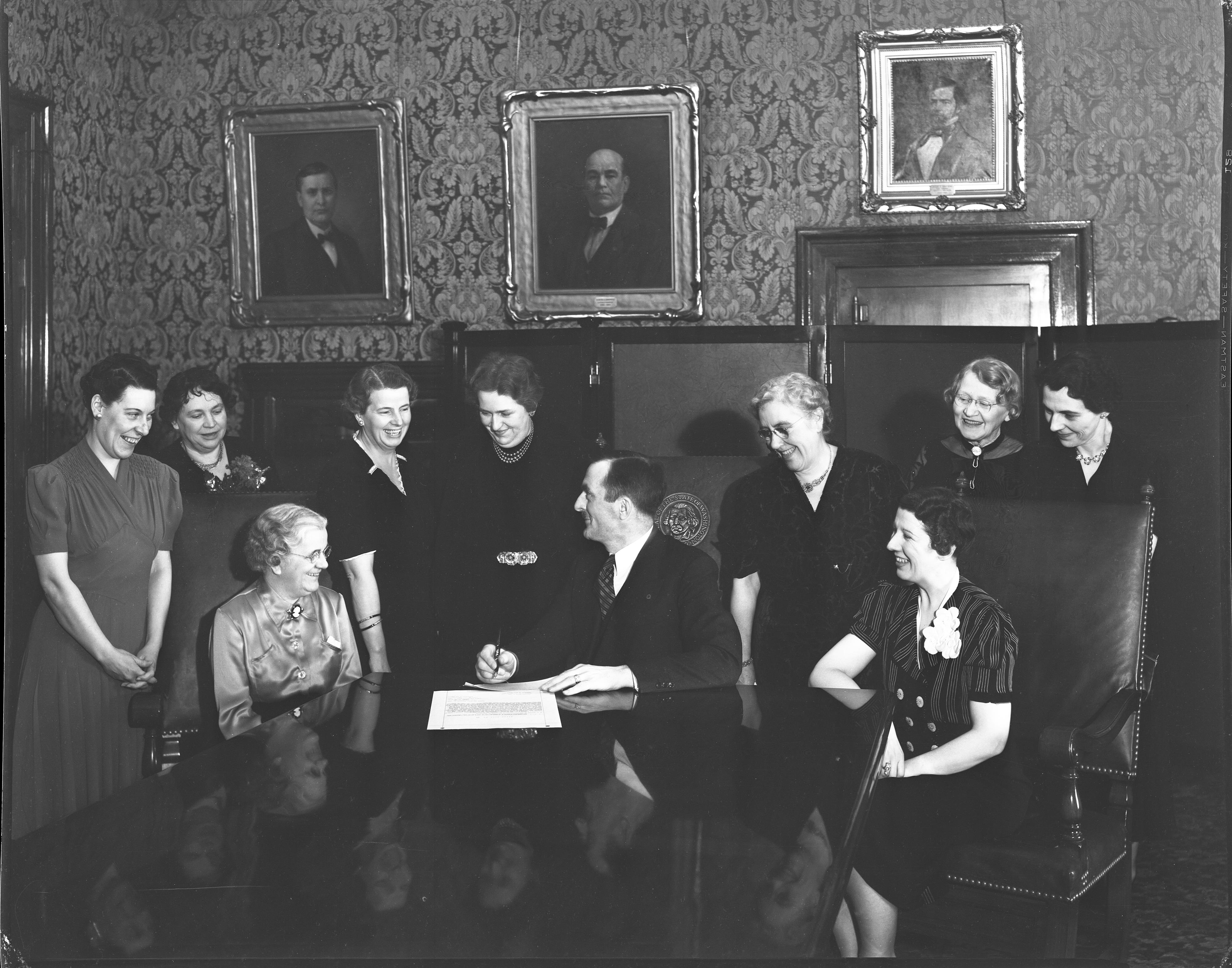
Haddon with Governor Clarence D. Martin in 1939

She was elected to the Washington State Senate in 1936. As chair of the education committee, she sponsored legislation for the state to adopt seven junior colleges and worked with fellow senator Monty Percival to sponsor legislation establishing the Western State Custodial School (later renamed the Rainier School) in Buckley. This was the first school in western Washington for students with developmental disabilities. She sponsored legislation for the Washington State Department of Highways to purchase the Manette Bridge, over the Port Washington Narrows, and discontinue the toll that had caused severe traffic delays. On January 28, 1939, she cut the ribbon to officially open the toll-free bridge. She was re-elected in the 1940 general election but Martin was not, having been defeated by Republican Arthur B. Langlie for governor. Haddon considered him a close ally and was frustrated by Langlie.

During World War II, Haddon sold the family grocery store, as her husband had died in 1938, but she struggled financially. She continued her work in the legislature, joining the state housing authority board and working to find funding for additional housing for workers that had moved to Bremerton to work at the Puget Sound Naval Shipyard. She was encouraged by her constituents to run for office as the city's finance commissioner, which had a higher salary, and she was elected in 1942, resigning from the senate the same year. She remained in office until 1952, when she unsuccessfully contested the state senate, losing to Ralph Purvis.

While in the legislature, Haddon had pushed for a junior college to be opened in Bremerton but this had been shelved after the outbreak of World War II. When the war ended, she joined the advisory committee and Olympic College opened to students on September 5, 1946. Her daughter, Frances Haddon Morgan, was elected to her old seat in the Washington House of Representatives in 1956 and in 1960, she was elected to her mother's old seat in the state senate. Haddon attended her daughter's swearing-in ceremony for the senate on January 10, 1961, the only mother and daughter to hold the same seats in both chambers of the legislature.

== Death and legacy ==
Haddon died on June 20, 1964, at Harrison Memorial Hospital in Bremerton. Haddon Hall, a building at the Rainier School, Lulu D. Haddon Elementary School and Lulu D. Haddon Park in Bremerton were named in her honor.
