= Beverly Woods =

American politician from Washington

Member of the Washington House of Representatives from the 23rd district
- In office December 2, 1999 – January 8, 2007
- Preceded by: Karen Schmidt
- Succeeded by: Christine Rolfes

Personal details
- Born: July 30, 1950 (age 75) California
- Party: Republican

Beverly Woods (born July 30, 1950) is an American politician who served in the Washington House of Representatives from the 23rd district from 1999 to 2007.
