= Gordon Walgren =

American politician and lawyer (1933–2018)

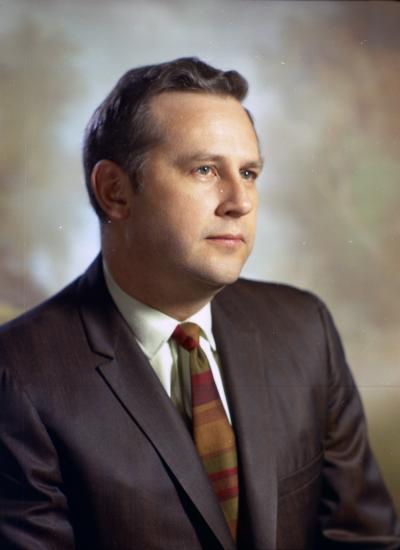
- Walgren in 1969

Majority Leader of the Washington Senate
- In office January 10, 1977 – January 12, 1981
- Preceded by: August P. Mardesich
- Succeeded by: Jeannette C. Hayner

Member of the Washington Senate from the 23rd district
- In office January 13, 1969 – January 12, 1981
- Preceded by: Frances Haddon Morgan
- Succeeded by: Ellen Craswell

Member of the Washington House of Representatives from the 23rd district
- In office December 1, 1966 – January 13, 1969
- Preceded by: Jack H. Rogers
- Succeeded by: Robert W. Randall

Personal details
- Born: Gordon Lee Walgren; March 7, 1933 Bremerton, Washington, U.S.
- Died: March 13, 2018 (aged 85) Bremerton, Washington, U.S.
- Party: Democratic

Gordon Lee Walgren (March 7, 1933 – March 13, 2018) was an American lawyer and politician.

Walgren was appointed to the Washington House of Representatives in November 1966 and served the remaining term in 1966. Walgren served in the Washington State Senator from 1967 to 1980, and was Senate Majority Leader from 1975 onward. Though he was convicted of racketeering prior to the 1980 election, he still won the primary election.

He was born in Bremerton, Washington and graduated from Bremerton High School. He earned a Business and Doctor of Law degrees from the University of Washington.

Walgren was convicted of mail fraud, racketeering, and violations of the Travel Act. Two of the three counts - mail fraud and racketeering - were later overturned.

Walgren was a lawyer and businessman. In 2013, Walgren published his memoir: Close To The Flames. Walgren died at his home on March 13, 2018.
