= Betti Sheldon =

American politician (1935–2020)

Member of the Washington Senate from the 23rd district
- In office January 11, 1993 – January 12, 2005
- Preceded by: Ellen Craswell
- Succeeded by: Phil Rockefeller

Personal details
- Born: April 9, 1935 Aberdeen, Washington, U.S.
- Died: July 23, 2020 (aged 85) Bremerton, Washington, U.S.
- Party: Democratic
- Children: 5
- Education: Gonzaga University (attended)

Betti L. Sheldon (née Guiles; April 9, 1935 – July 23, 2020) was an American politician who served as a member of the Washington State Senate, representing the 23rd district, from 1993 to 2005. A member of the Democratic Party, she defeated incumbent Republican and Senate president pro tempore Ellen Craswell in 1992.
