= Gonder (surname) =

Gonder is a surname. Notable people with the surname include:

- Fernand Gonder (1883–1969), French pole vaulter
- Jesse Gonder (1936–2004), American baseball player
- Mamu Ram Gonder (Daunkal) (1947–2020), Indian politician
- Ted Gonder (born 1990), American non-profit executive
