= Gertrude L. Johnson =

American politician

Member of the Washington House of Representatives from the 23rd district
- In office 1943–1945
- Preceded by: Lulu Haddon

Personal details
- Born: 1884 Indiana
- Died: October 18, 1964 (aged 79–80) Rolling Bay, Washington
- Party: Republican

Gertrude L. Johnson (1884 – October 18, 1964) was an American politician. She was a Republican, representing District 23 in the Washington House of Representatives which included parts of Kitsap County, from 1943 to 1945.
