= Karen Schmidt =

American politician from Washington

Member of the Washington House of Representatives from the 23rd district
- In office January 12, 1981 – November 7, 1999
- Preceded by: Ellen Craswell
- Succeeded by: Beverly Woods

Personal details
- Born: November 27, 1945 (age 80) Los Angeles, California
- Party: Republican

Karen Schmidt (born November 27, 1945) is an American politician who served in the Washington House of Representatives from the 23rd district from 1981 to 1999.
