= Alice Hill =

American judge and climate policy academic

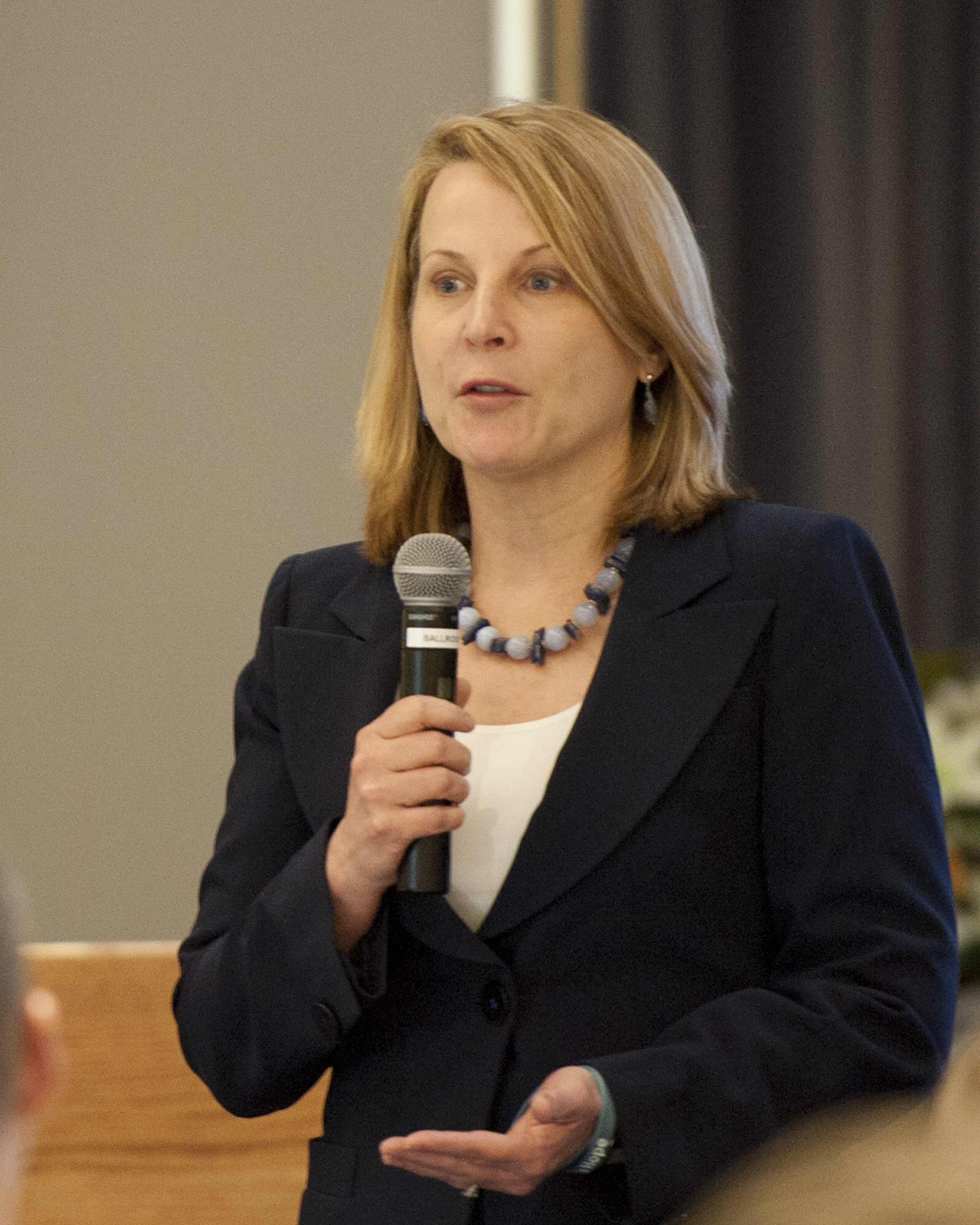
Alice Hill speaking in 2012

Alice Chamberlayne Hill is an American policy-maker, thought leader, and academic. She currently serves as the David M. Rubinstein senior fellow for energy and the environment at the Council on Foreign Relations. She previously served as a fellow at Stanford University's Hoover Institution. During the Obama administration, she was Special Assistant to the President and Senior Director for Resilience Policy at the National Security Council, leading development of policy regarding national security and climate change, building climate resilience considerations and capabilities into international development and other federal initiatives, and developing national risk-management standards for damaging natural hazards. Prior, she served as Senior Counselor to the Secretary of the Department of Homeland Security, as a federal prosecutor, and judge and supervising judge within the Los Angeles Superior Court.

Oxford University Press published her The Fight for Climate After COVID-19 in 2021, as well as her co-authored book, Building a Resilient Tomorrow, in 2019. Hill is a frequent author whose work has appeared in Foreign Affairs, Axios, Newsweek, Foreign Policy, The Bridge, The Hill, Lawfare, CNN, The Bulletin and other media. She has appeared as an expert commentator on NPR, CNN, and MSNBC.

== Education ==
Hill attended Stanford University, where she earned her BA with distinction in history and economics. She went on to earn her Juris Doctor degree from the University of Virginia Law School.

== Legal career ==
Hill started her judicial career by serving as a law clerk for federal District Court Judge Joseph Young for the District of Maryland. She then worked as an associate for de Chambrun and Associates in Paris, France, and Morrison and Foerster in Los Angeles, California.

Hill next joined the United States Attorney's Office in Los Angeles as an Assistant United States Attorney. She eventually served as chief of the major frauds unit, supervising over thirty prosecutors handling white-collar crime involving losses in the billions of dollars. While at the US Attorney's Office, she served as co-lead prosecutor for the successful prosecution of Charles Keating, Jr., which at the time was the largest white-collar crime case ever investigated by the Federal Bureau of Investigation. The US Department of Justice honored her with the John Marshall Award for Outstanding Legal Achievement.

In 1995, Governor Pete Wilson (R) appointed Hill as a judge of the Los Angeles Municipal Court where she served as supervising judge of the San Fernando Court. In 2000, she became a Los Angeles County superior court judge, eventually serving as the supervising judge of the North Valley District where she oversaw the operations of three courthouses and approximately thirty judges and commissioners. Her fellow judges elected her to the Los Angeles Superior Court Executive Committee and the San Fernando Valley Bar Association named her Judge of the Year in 2004.

== Government Work ==
In 2009, Hill was asked to serve as Senior Counselor to the Secretary of the Department of Homeland Security (DHS) Janet Napolitano, helping guide senior leadership of DHS agencies, briefing Congress, and leading and establishing DHS-wide programs. She led the development of DHS' first-ever climate adaptation strategy and founded and led the anti-human trafficking initiative, Blue Campaign. She also oversaw the development of strategic plans and policies regarding catastrophic biological and chemical incidents ranging from pandemics to weapons of mass destruction. In addition she served ex officio the federal advisory committee for the Third National Climate Assessment.

For three years beginning in 2013, Hill served in several positions for the National Security Council in the White House, including managing a team of National Security Council Directors, and developed Federal policies regarding national preparedness for all hazards of global consequence, including climate. Hill led the development of President Obama's executive orders establishing a national flood standard for buildings, which President Trump rescinded and President Biden reinstated, as well as a national wildfire standard. She also oversaw the development of executive orders regarding national security and climate change, international climate resilient development, drought preparedness, and coordination of federal efforts in the Arctic.

She was honored with the Meta-Leader of the Year award from Harvard University's National Preparedness Leadership Initiative.

== Post-Government Work ==
Hill is the David M. Rubinstein senior fellow for energy and environment at the Council on Foreign Relations, where she focuses on risks, consequences, and responses associated with climate change. She previously served as senior fellow for climate change policy at CFR. In 2020, she was awarded the Public Voices Fellowship on the Climate Crisis, a collaboration between The OpEd Project and the Yale Program on Climate Change Communication.

Prior to joining the Council on Foreign Relations, Hill served as a research fellow at Stanford University's Hoover Institution.

Hill chaired the California Department of Insurance Working Group tasked with making recommendations to ensure the availability of private insurance in California, which is the sixth largest insurance market in the world, in the face of growing climate risk.

Hill is a member of the boards of directors and audit committees of the domestic subsidiaries of Munich Re Group, a board member and chair of the audit committmeeof the Environmental Defense Fund. Hill is also a founding board member of the Council on Strategic Risks. In 2017, she was honored for her work with the President's Award from the National Institute of Building Sciences.

Hill previously served as chair of the governing board of National Cathedral School, from which she graduated, and was a member of the board of the Protestant Episcopal Cathedral Foundation, which oversees the four institutions on the National Cathedral Close, including the National Cathedral.

The American Academy in Berlin awarded her the Berlin Prize and the RWE inaugural fellowship. She was an inaugural Visiting Policy Fellow for Stanford University's Woods Institute for the Environment. Yale University and the Op-Ed Project awarded her the Public Voices Fellowship on the Climate Crisis. The Rockefeller Foundation has twice awarded Hill its Bellagio Center Residency Fellowship.

== Books ==
Hill authored The Fight for Climate After COVID-19, published by Oxford University Press in 2021. The Fight for Climate After COVID-19 "draws upon our collective experience with the global pandemic to create a blueprint for climate preparedness, including marrying mitigation and adaptation efforts."

Hill also co-authored with Leonardo Martinez-Diaz Building a Resilient Tomorrow, published by Oxford University Press in 2019. While squarely confronting the scale of the risks the world faces because of climate change, Building a Resilient Tomorrow focuses on solutions—some gradual and some more revolutionary—currently being deployed around the globe.

The American Academy in Berlin awarded her the Berlin Prize and the Rockefeller Foundation has twice awarded Hill its Bellagio Center Residency Fellowship.

== Family ==
Hill's father was international lawyer, Dumond Peck Hill, who for over three decades served as managing partner at three Washington, DC, law firms, the last being Kirkpatrick & Lockhart. Her mother, Elizabeth Hill, founded the publishing house, Starr-Hill Press, with Hill's mother-in-law, Martha Starr.

Hill is married to Peter Starr, former Provost at American University. They are the parents of two adult daughters.
