= Phil Rockefeller =

American politician (1938–2026)

Member of the Washington Senate from the 23rd district
- In office January 12, 2005 – June 30, 2011
- Preceded by: Betti Sheldon
- Succeeded by: Christine Rolfes

Personal details
- Born: November 20, 1938 Rhinebeck, New York, U.S.
- Died: April 15, 2026 (aged 87) Bainbridge Island, Washington, U.S.
- Party: Democratic (1990–)
- Other political affiliations: Republican (before 1990)
- Spouse(s): Anita Rockefeller, Claudette G. Baker div. 1973
- Children: 1 child with Anita Rockefeller 2 children with Claudette G. Baker
- Education: Yale University (BA); Harvard Law School (JD)
- Occupation: Lawyer

Warren Philips Rockefeller (November 20, 1938 – April 15, 2026) was an American lawyer and politician who served as a Washington state senator, as a Democrat, for the 23rd legislative district, which includes Bainbridge Island, Keyport, Poulsbo, Kingston, Hansville, Silverdale, and most of East Bremerton.

== Life and career ==
Rockefeller received his undergraduate degree from Yale University and his J.D. degree from Harvard. Before winning election to the legislature, he was education aide to Gov. John Spellman and Regional Commissioner of the U.S. Office of Education. Phil served as the assistant majority floor leader and chair of the Water, Energy & Telecommunications Committee (formerly the Water, Energy & Environment Committee, to which he was vice chair), and was a member of both the Natural Resources, Ocean & Recreation Committee (formerly vice chair) and the Ways & Means Committee.

In a district defined by its unique geography and emphasis on quality of life, he was an advocate for clean air and water, as well as quality jobs, schools and health care.

Boards and Committees: Legislative: Capital Projects Advisory Review Board (CPARB), Council of State Governments-WEST Western Water and Environment Committee, Joint Subcommittee on the Statutory Duties of the State Board of Education, Joint Legislative Audit and Review Committee (JLARC), National Conference of State Legislatures Clean Energy and Air Quality Working Group, National Conference of State Legislatures Environment and Natural Resources Committee, Puget Sound Partnership, Statute Law Committee. Non-Legislative: Kitsap Area Agency on Aging board member, Kitsap Community Resources board member

He resigned from the state senate in 2011 to accept an appointment to the Northwest Power and Conservation council.

Rockefeller and his wife, Anita, lived on Bainbridge Island and had three daughters. He died on April 15, 2026, at the age of 87.

== Recognition ==
Rockefeller was chosen as Washington Conservation Voters' 2007 Legislator of the Year and was an environmental champion in the 2005–2006 Legislative Scorecard.

== See also ==
- Washington State Legislature
