= Christine Rolfes =

American politician from Washington

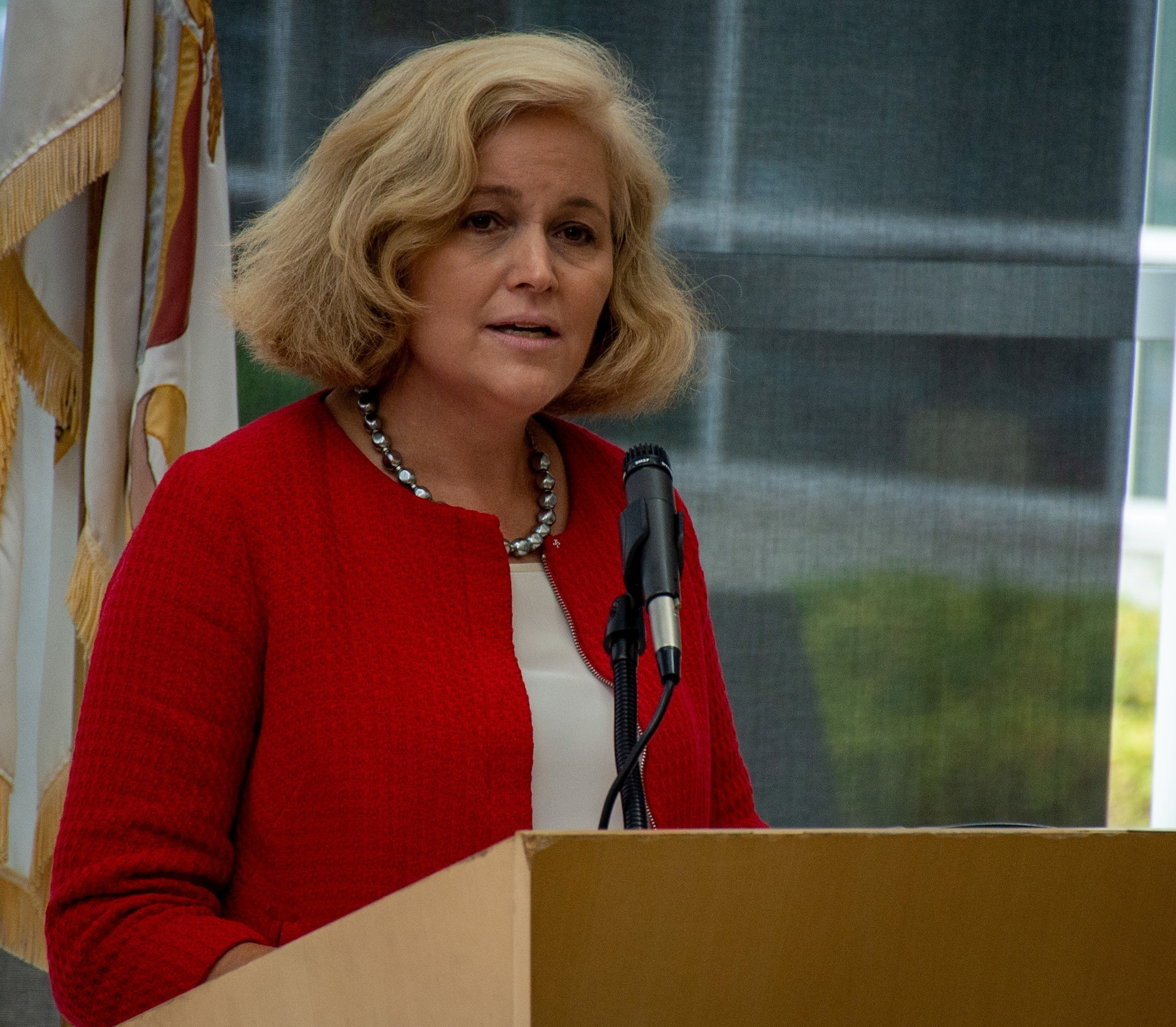

Member of the Washington Senate from the 23rd district
- In office July 26, 2011 – August 15, 2023
- Preceded by: Phil Rockefeller
- Succeeded by: Drew Hansen

Member of the Washington House of Representatives from the 23rd district
- In office January 8, 2007 – July 26, 2011
- Preceded by: Beverly Woods
- Succeeded by: Drew Hansen

Personal details
- Born: Christine Margaret Nasser; March 25, 1967 (age 59) North Tarrytown, New York, U.S.
- Party: Democratic
- Spouse: Leonard Rolfes
- Children: 2
- Education: University of Virginia (BA); University of Washington (MPA)
- Website: State Senate website

Christine Margaret Rolfes (née Nasser, born March 25, 1967) is an American politician. A member of the Democratic Party, she served as the Washington State Senator for the 23rd District between 2011 and 2023. The 23rd District includes Bainbridge Island, Silverdale, Poulsbo, Kingston, and parts of Bremerton.

Rolfes has focused on funding and educational reform, small businesses, ferries, military and veteran families, and the environment.

== Biography ==
Rolfes was born in North Tarrytown, New York.

Rolfes earned a BA in Economics from the University of Virginia and then an MPA from the University of Washington.

From 2000 until 2006, Rolfes served on the Bainbridge Island City Council.

From January 2007 until July 2011, Rolfes served as a Democratic representative of the 23rd district in the Washington State House of Representatives.

In July 2011, Rolfes was appointed to serve as Washington State Senator for the 23rd District. She was then elected to that position in her own right on November 6, 2012.

On June 5, 2023, Rolfes was appointed to the Kitsap County board of commissioners. She was sworn in on June 20, and announced her intent to step down from her Senate seat on August 15.
