= Eloy Pérez =

Mexican boxer (1986–2019)

Personal information
- Nickname: El Principe
- Born: Eloy Pérez; October 25, 1986 Oaxaca, Mexico
- Died: October 5, 2019 (aged 32)
- Height: 5 ft 6 in (167 cm)
- Weight: Super featherweight

Boxing career
- Reach: 70 in (180 cm)
- Stance: Orthodox

Boxing record
- Total fights: 27
- Wins: 23
- Win by KO: 7
- Losses: 1
- Draws: 2
- No contests: 1

Eloy Pérez (October 25, 1986 – October 5, 2019) was a Mexican professional boxer who was raised in Thurston County, Washington. He was signed to Oscar De La Hoya's Golden Boy Promotions in the featherweight division. He won the WBO NABO super featherweight title. He died unexpectedly on October 5, 2019, from a gunshot wound in Tijuana, Mexico, where he had been living since 2016.

== Early years & amateur career ==
Raised in Rochester, Washington, Pérez began boxing at the age of 13. Starting in 1999, he went on to have a 55–11 record, with his final amateur match, in which the 17-year-old defeated 22-year-old Canadian Arash Usmanee, earning him the 132-pound Ringside World Championship. He won the Golden Gloves championship in 2004 as well.

== Professional career ==
While still attending high school in Rainier, Washington after moving there with his family, Pérez began boxing professionally under the management of Jim Douglas. He often fought in matches at the local Lucky Eagle Casino in Rochester; his first six-round bout took place the same weekend that he graduated high school.

Pérez began fighting out of Salinas, California, with the Garcia Boxing camp. For the Floyd Mayweather Jr. vs. Shane Mosley card, he was the main sparring partner of Shane Mosley. On September 12, 2009, Pérez won the WBO NABO super featherweight title by unanimous decision, beating the previously undefeated Dannie Williams in the tenth round at a match at the Playboy Mansion. In 2010, Pérez signed a five-year promotional deal with Golden Boy Promotions. In May 2010, Eloy beat contender Gilberto Sanchez-Leon by a ten-round majority decision.

In 2012, Pérez was set to compete against Adrien Broner as a challenger for the WBO world super featherweight title. As both were talented, undefeated boxers, there was speculation as to how the match would turn out, with William Holmes describing Pérez's history:

"Eloy Perez, a California native, has yet to fight any fighters with a recognizable name. However, the record of his last five opponents comes out to 101-15-1. While Perez has yet to fight someone that the average boxing fan would have heard of, he has consistently fought competition with winning records, and Saturday may be his chance to shine. Perez has two draws on his record, but they came in 2007 and 2006 in short eight round affairs. Power is something Perez does not appear to have. Of his 23 victories, only 7 have come by KO or TKO, but he was able to finish his opponent in his last two victories."

On February 25, 2012, Pérez was knocked out in the fourth round by Broner. After the fight, Pérez tested positive for cocaine. It was ultimately his final fight, as he never boxed professionally again.

== Death ==
After his professional career had been suspended, arrests for driving under the influence led to his lengthy detainment at the Northwest Detention Center. Unsure of when he would otherwise be released, in 2016, Pérez, an undocumented immigrant, agreed to be deported to Mexico, a place he had left as a young child. After three years in Tijuana building a new life for himself, he was found dead from a gunshot wound to the head on October 5, 2019. His sister traveled to Mexico to recover his body and have it cremated; after the local community expressed their grief, she brought his ashes back to Washington, where the community he grew up in celebrated his life in a memorial service at his alma mater Rainier High School.

== Professional boxing record ==
27 fights	23 wins	1 loss
By knockout	7	1
By decision	16	0
Draws	2	
No contests	1	

No.	Result	Record	Opponent	Type	Round, time	Date	Location	Notes
27	Loss	23–1–2 (1)	(United States) Adrien Broner	KO	4 (12), 2:44	Feb 25, 2012	(United States) Scottrade Center, St. Louis, Missouri, U.S.	For WBO super featherweight title
