= Rainier, Washington =

City in Thurston County, Washington

- City
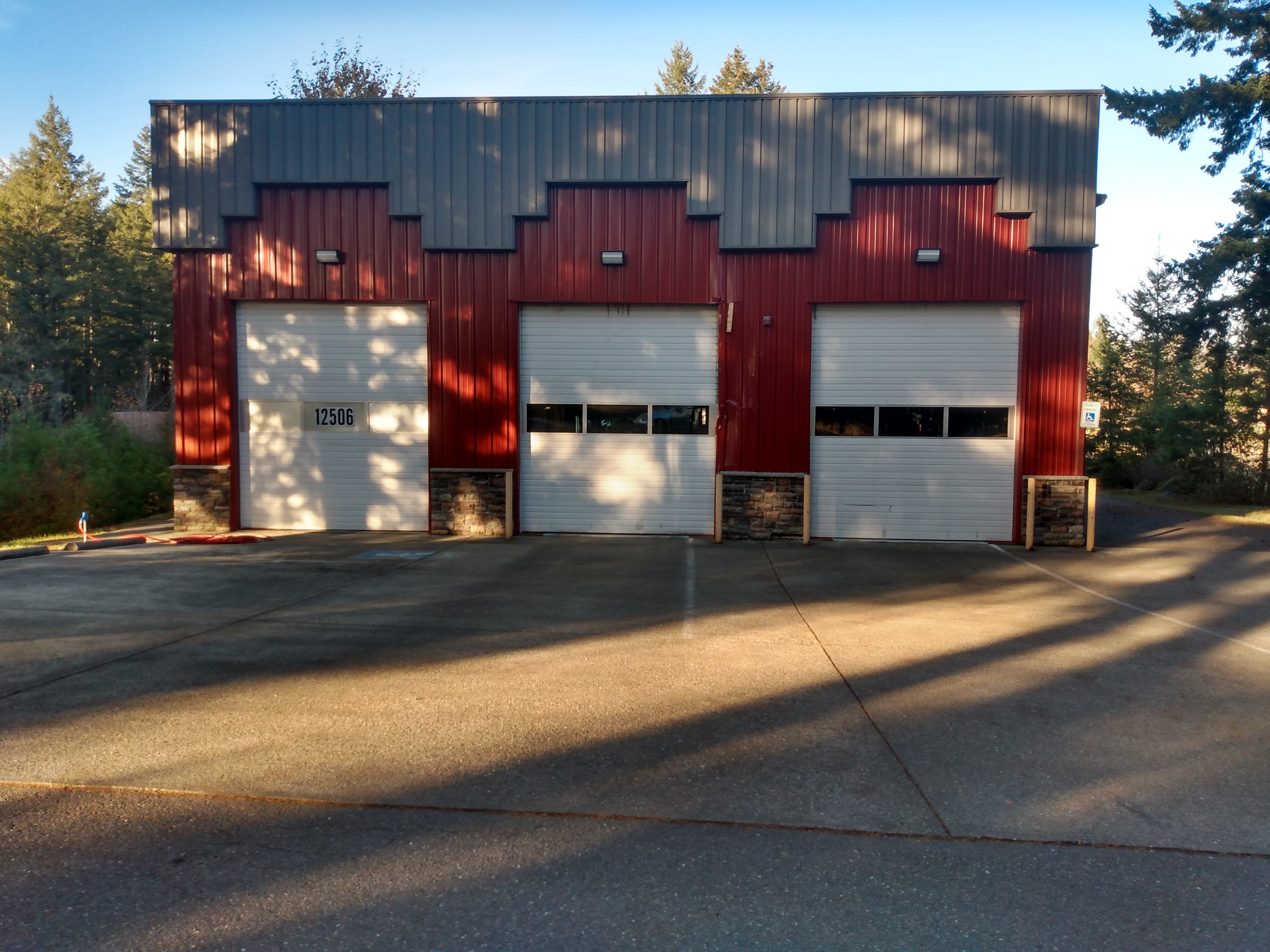
- Rainier Fire Station
- Interactive location map of Rainier
- Coordinates: 46°53′27″N 122°41′23″W
- Country: United States
- State: Washington
- County: Thurston
- Established: October 20, 1947

Government
  - Type: Mayor–council
  - Mayor: Robert Shaw

Area
  - Total: 1.74 sq mi (4.50 km^{2})
  - Land: 1.74 sq mi (4.50 km^{2})
  - Water: 0 sq mi (0.00 km^{2})
- Elevation: 433 ft (132 m)

Population (2020)
  - Total: 2,369
  - Estimate (2021): 2,486
  - Density: 1,315.7/sq mi (508.01/km^{2})
- Time zone: UTC-8 (PST)
  - Summer (DST): UTC-7 (PDT)
- ZIP Code: 98576
- Area code: 360, 564
- FIPS code: 53-57220
- GNIS feature ID: 1507707
- Website: cityofrainierwa.org

Rainier (/reɪˈnɪər/ ray-NEER) is a city in Thurston County, Washington, United States. Beginning as a train stop in the 1870s, Rainier was first settled in 1890 and would become known as a logging town. The city was officially incorporated in 1947. As of the 2020 census, Rainier had a population of 2,369.

== History ==
=== Indigenous history ===
Rainier is situated in an area known as the Tenalquot Prairie. Known also as "Te-nal-cut", "Ta-nal-cuth", or "Ten-al-quelth" to indigenous people in the area, the word most likely means "the best yet" or "happy land" in the Lushootseed language. Another possible meaning is that of a mink in search of home in a human settlement.

=== 19th century and establishment ===
By the 1840s, the prairie was used for sheep farming station under the Puget Sound Agricultural Company. Rainier began in the 1870s as a "Prairie Line" stop on the Northern Pacific Railroad track between Kalama, Washington, Tenino and Tacoma. In 1884, the town was named for its view of Mount Rainier.

German immigrants Albert and Maria Gehrke were the first non-indigenous settlers to homestead in Rainier, arriving in 1890. Later that year a store and post office were established by Henry Harmer, who homesteaded with his wife Jessie and children on the Deschutes River near Rainier. Rainier was officially platted by George H. Ellsbury in 1891.

Ellsbury modeled the new town after a settlement he began in the Dakota Territory. (Note: The Ellsbury town, given the name Tower, is known in the present-day as Tower City, North Dakota; it was named after Charlemagne Tower.) The "Rainier Colony" initially began under Ellsbury's idea as a cooperative settlement though it remains uncertain how much of the development was completed or followed. By 1891, Rainier grew to include additional families, buildings, and a hotel. In 1896, the community's first full-time school as well as a Lutheran church were built by Albert Gehrke and his two brothers, Theodore and Paul; the buildings are state historic landmarks.

=== 20th century ===
The original school was converted into the Zion Evangelical Lutheran Church after a new schoolhouse was built in the early 1900s; the church had been founded by German settlers the prior decade. The church was used once again for educational purposes after a fire at the schoolhouse in 1915.

In 1906, the Bob White Lumber Company opened, bringing prosperity to the area through logging and sawmilling. Other lumber companies, such as Deschutes, Gruber and Docherty, and Fir Tree, were soon attracted to the area as well, building mills or railroad spurs in the late 1900s into the mid-1910s. A depot was built in 1910 after the arrival of a line by the Chicago, Milwaukee, St. Paul and Pacific Railroad. In the late 1920s and early 1930s, several of these mill operations and many of the local buildings were destroyed by a series of fires, leading many residents to seek work at Weyerhaeuser Lumber at nearby Vail, a present-day ghost town.

A state forest camp, known as Camp Rainier, was built in the town during the 1930s by the Civilian Conservation Corps. In 1936, Rainier's third school was built out of brick. The construction of this new school allowed for the 1926 second story to be removed, leaving it as a single story building again.

Rainier's 1940 population was 500. In 1941, the WPA Guide to Washington described Rainier as "the social center for farmers and loggers of the vicinity, although its closed mills and vacant houses mark it as a ghost lumber town." The population was recorded to be approximately 315 during the 1947 vote for incorporation.

Rainier was officially incorporated on October 20, 1947; the incorporation, known as a "city of the fourth class", passed by a town vote of 74 to 31. A mayor-council form of government was approved; Glenn Lund served as the city's first mayor In 1948, Rainier opened its town hall at 102 Dakota Street South; it housed the Rainier town council, police department, and fire department.

On May 4, 1974, Rainier High School was destroyed by a fire caused by an electrical fault in an attic storage space; the state's fire marshal office had previously noted several fire hazards during inspections of the building. Classes were cancelled for the remainder of the school year; a set of 13 portable classrooms were constructed adjacent to the destroyed building by local residents and soldiers from nearby Fort Lewis. The portable buildings had been sold at cost by Seattle Public Schools after they were withdrawn from a surplus auction. A new building for Rainier High School—along with a new elementary school—was opened on September 1, 1976. In late 1979, the Town of Rainier considered leasing a portable building from Rainier School District as the existing town hall had grown too small to hold meetings in. While the school board was willing to lease the building, they were only willing to do so for a 1-year term, citing that increasing enrollment numbers could necessitate the use of the building.

In 1990, Rainier's current Town Hall was built at 102 Rochester Street West. It was assembled from several prefabricated pieces, forming the manufactured building that serves as the Town Hall.

=== 21st century ===
Rainier officially adopted the title of "City of Rainier" in 2001. In the 21st century, Rainier is considered to be a rural, suburban community with a majority of the population commuting to Olympia or Tacoma.

== Geography ==
According to the United States Census Bureau, the city has a total area of 1.73 square miles (4.48 km^{2}), all of it land. In terms of land cover, 18% (179 acres) of the city is urban, 27% (267 acres (1.08 km^{2})) is forested, and 55% (540 acres (2.2 km^{2})) is covered with non-forest vegetation and soils.

=== Climate ===
The climate of Rainier tends to be relatively mild. Although the temperature reached a record high of 104 °F (40 °C) in 1981, the average temperature of the hottest month, August, is 76 °F (24 °C). Similarly, while the record low temperature was −8 °F (−22 °C) in 1979, the average temperature of January, the coldest month, is 32 °F (0 °C). With an average of 8.13 inches (207 mm) of precipitation, November is the wettest month. Rainier averages approximately 50 inches (1,300 mm) of precipitation a year.

== Demographics ==
Historical population
Census	Pop.	Note	%±
1950	331		—
1960	245		−26.0%
1970	382		55.9%
1980	891		133.2%
1990	991		11.2%
2000	1,492		50.6%
2010	1,794		20.2%
2020	2,369		32.1%
2021 (est.)	2,486		4.9%
U.S. Decennial Census; 2020 Census

=== 2020 census ===
As of the 2020 census, Rainier had a population of 2,369, with a median age of 35.1 years; 26.8% of residents were under the age of 18 and 12.8% were 65 years of age or older. For every 100 females there were 97.9 males, and for every 100 females age 18 and over there were 95.8 males age 18 and over.

There were 814 households in Rainier, of which 41.6% had children under the age of 18 living in them. Of all households, 56.0% were married-couple households, 15.4% were households with a male householder and no spouse or partner present, and 18.6% were households with a female householder and no spouse or partner present. About 16.0% of all households were made up of individuals and 6.5% had someone living alone who was 65 years of age or older.

There were 850 housing units, of which 4.2% were vacant. The homeowner vacancy rate was 1.4% and the rental vacancy rate was 7.9%.

0.0% of residents lived in urban areas, while 100.0% lived in rural areas.

Racial composition as of the 2020 census
Race	Number	Percent
White	1,969	83.1%
Black or African American	22	0.9%
American Indian and Alaska Native	30	1.3%
Asian	47	2.0%
Native Hawaiian and Other Pacific Islander	16	0.7%
Some other race	60	2.5%
Two or more races	225	9.5%
Hispanic or Latino (of any race)	192	8.1%

=== 2010 census ===
As of the 2010 census, there were 1,794 people, 656 households, and 484 families residing in the city. The population density was 1,037.0 inhabitants per square mile (400.4/km^{2}). There were 717 housing units at an average density of 414.5 per square mile (160.0/km^{2}). The racial makeup of the city was 90.7% White, 1.2% African American, 1.2% Native American, 1.1% Asian, 0.1% Pacific Islander, 1.1% from other races, and 4.6% from two or more races. Hispanic or Latino of any race were 5.0% of the population.

There were 656 households, of which 40.1% had children under the age of 18 living with them, 54.1% were married couples living together, 13.4% had a female householder with no husband present, 6.3% had a male householder with no wife present, and 26.2% were non-families. 20.3% of all households were made up of individuals, and 5.6% had someone living alone who was 65 years of age or older. The average household size was 2.73 and the average family size was 3.11.

The median age in the city was 37.1 years. 26.1% of residents were under the age of 18; 7% were between the ages of 18 and 24; 28.2% were from 25 to 44; 29.2% were from 45 to 64; and 9.4% were 65 years of age or older. The gender makeup of the city was 49.7% male and 50.3% female.

== Arts and culture ==
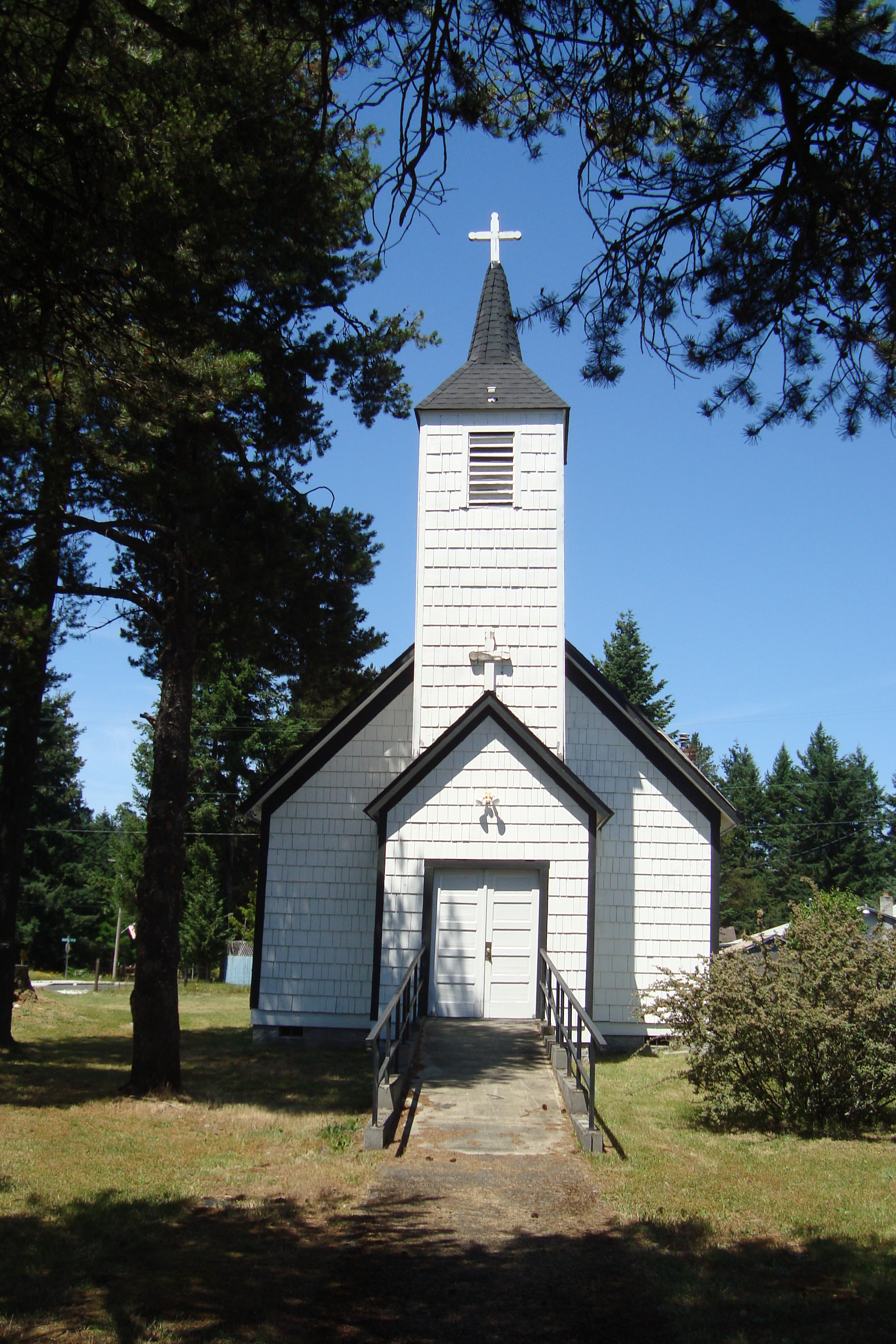
Church built by Gehrke brothers in 1896

=== Art ===
To the northeast of downtown Rainier on a trestle support over Washington State Route 507 is a mural known as the Sgt. Justin Norton Memorial Mural. Norton, who died in 2006 during the Iraq War, was a graduate of Rainier High School. Installed in 2011, repeated vandalism of the mural had led to several repairs and re-paintings. The mural was restored by Seattle graffiti artist and muralist, Jeff Jacobsen, known as "Weirdo", in 2025. Funds for the project were raised by a prior recipient of a memorial scholarship fund in Norton's name. The painting was expanded and reimagined to include a new portrait of Norton as well as symbolic additions regarding his military career and honors. The artwork was sealed to protect it from vandalism.

=== Festivals and events ===
Rainier hosts several annual events including two in August, the Rainier Roundup Days that began in the 1990s and includes a community parade and a bluegrass music festival, and the Rainier Community & Alumni Celebration honoring all past and present residents of Rainier. The community regularly hosts Relay for Life, during which, over an 18-hour time frame, participants walk around the high school track to raise money for the American Cancer Society.

=== Historical buildings and sites ===
The community is home to the Rainier School. Built in 1915, the schoolhouse was listed on the National Register of Historic Places in 2004. The school was purchased by the city in 1995 and converted into a community center. The building was also used as a food bank and volunteer library. The historic schoolhouse was restored in 2017 and became of use as office space for the Rainier School District.

The Zion Evangelical Lutheran Church was purchased by the city in 1995. The building was converted for use as an event space after a restoration in 2020. The church is listed as an historic building under the Washington Heritage Register.

== Parks and recreation ==
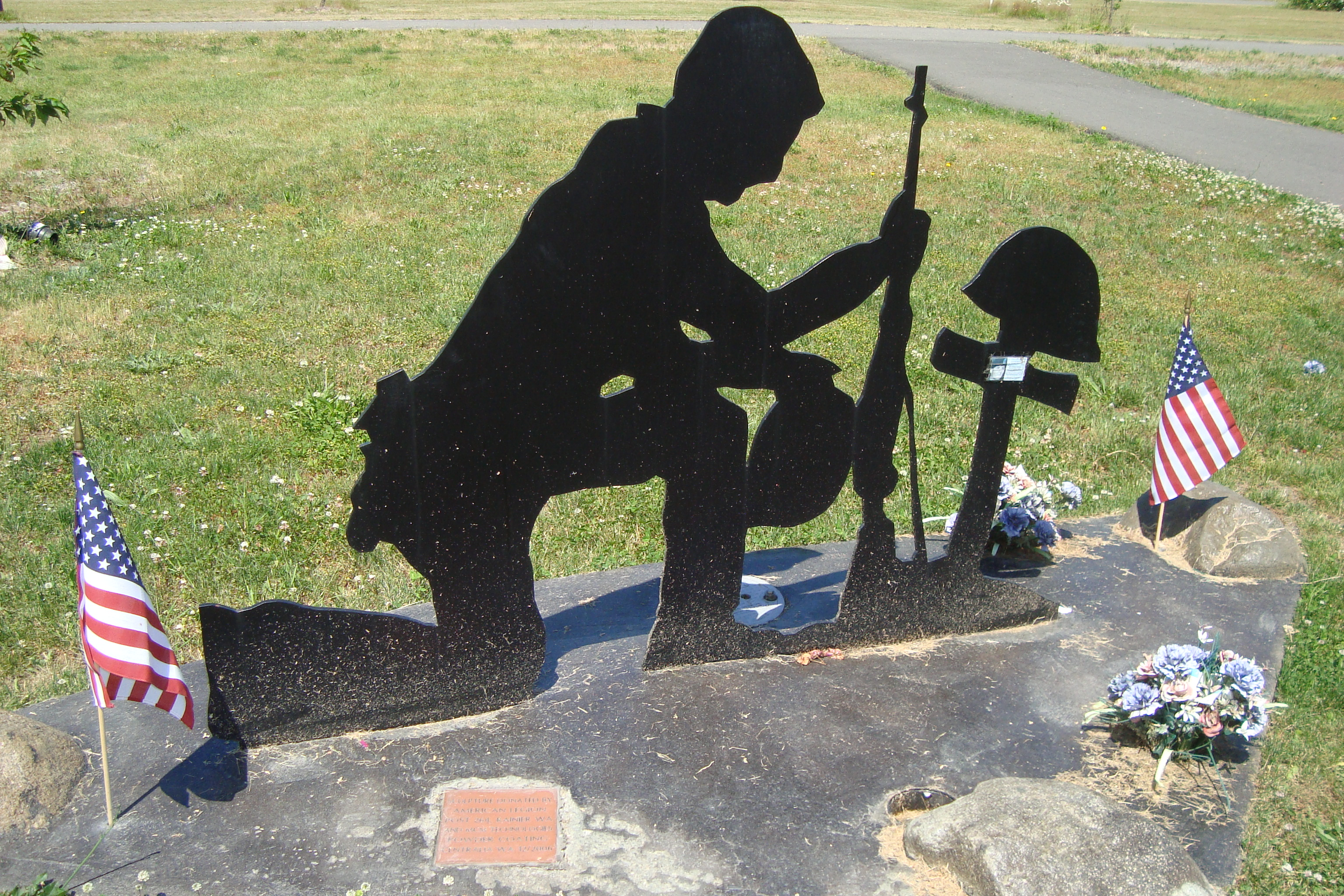
A monument at Veterans Memorial Park.

Rainier features eight acres of parks. In the center of town, the Veterans Memorial Park is dedicated to veterans and active military personnel, members of the fire and police departments, and various recognized volunteers and charitable groups both in the community and throughout the United States.

Nearby, Wilkowski Park is the site of the Rainier Roundup. Beside the park, the Yelm–Rainier–Tenino Trail connects the cities of Yelm, Rainier, and Tenino in a paved pathway for pedestrians and cyclists.

Other parks in Rainier include Gehrke Park, Holiday Park, and Raintree Park.

== Government ==
Rainier has a mayor–council government. In 2017, Robert Shaw became the mayor of Rainier. The city council has five members. Other government positions in Rainier include that of city administrator, clerk, treasurer, city attorney, and public works director.

== Education ==
Rainier is served by the Rainier School District 307. The district consists of an elementary school, a middle school, and Rainier High School. As of the 2021–2022 school year, the district's enrollment was 925 students, taught by 56 teachers.

As of the 2021–2022 school year, Rainier Elementary School was serving 463 students from kindergarten through fifth grade. The enrollment of Rainier Middle School, which serves sixth through eighth grade, was 215 in the 2021–2022 school year, with the principal as of 2017 being John Beckman. Rainier High School included 247 students from ninth through twelfth grade in the 2021–2022 school year.

== Notable people ==
- Linda Evans, television actress
- Chad Forcier, two-time NBA champion assistant coach
- Eloy Pérez, WBO and NABO super featherweight champion
- Billie Rogers, jazz trumpeter and singer
