= Drew Hansen =

American politician (born 1972/73)

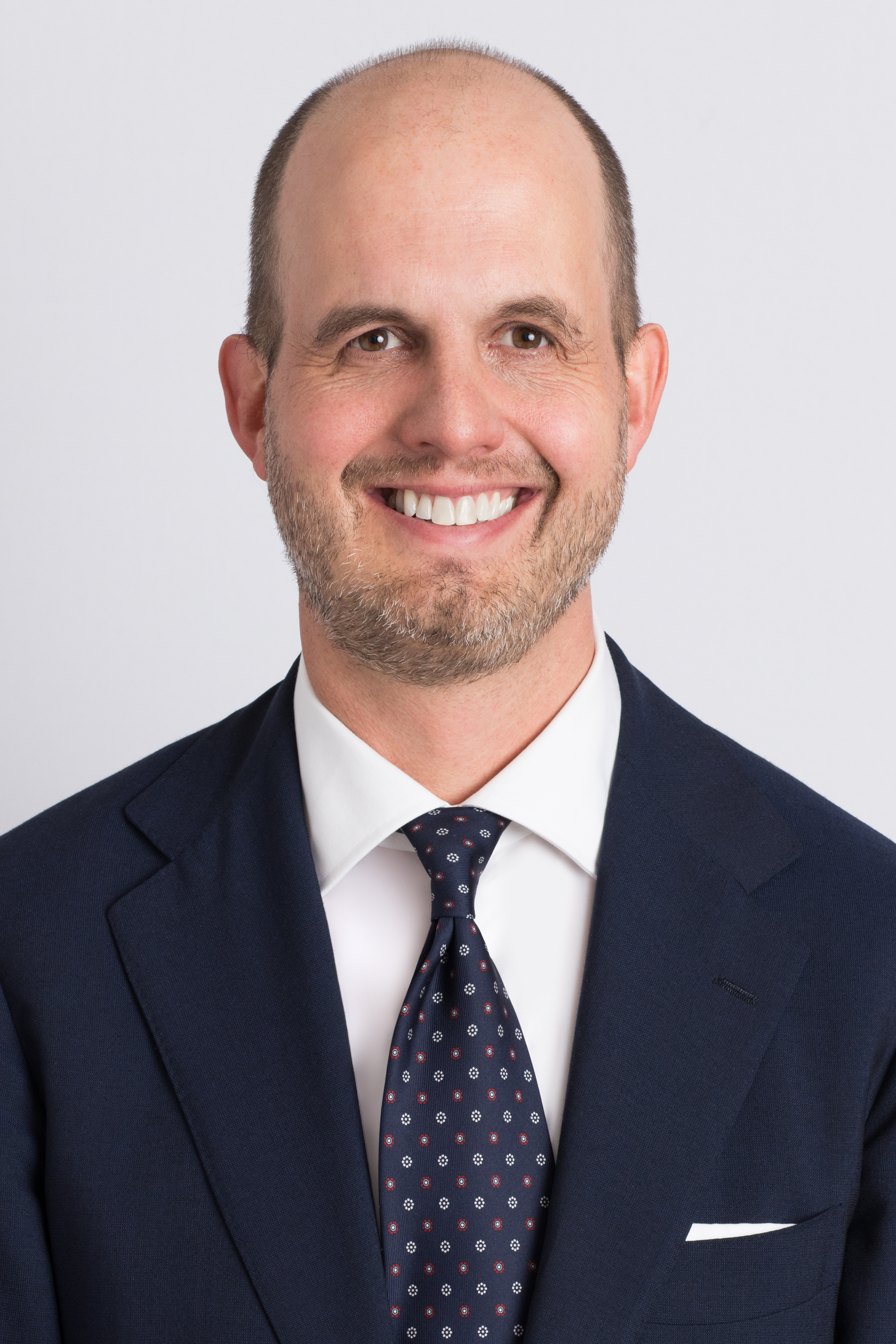

Member of the Washington State Senate from the 23rd district
- Incumbent
- Assumed office August 25, 2023
- Preceded by: Christine Rolfes

Member of the Washington House of Representatives from the 23rd district
- In office September 19, 2011 – August 25, 2023
- Preceded by: Christine Rolfes
- Succeeded by: Greg Nance

Personal details
- Born: Drew Derrick Hansen; 1972 or 1973 (age 52–53)
- Party: Democratic
- Spouse: Julie Cooper
- Children: 2
- Education: Harvard University (BA); Magdalen College, Oxford; Yale University (JD)
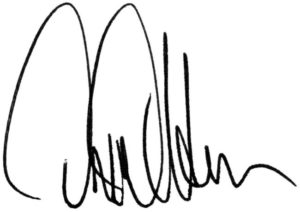
- Signature

Drew Derrick Hansen (born 1972/1973) is an American lawyer, author, and politician serving as a member of the Washington Senate from the 23rd district, elected in 2022. He previously represented the district in the Washington House of Representatives.

Hansen is the author of The Dream: Martin Luther King, Jr., and the Speech that Inspired a Nation. On August 23, 2023, Hansen was appointed to serve as Washington State Senator for the 23rd Legislative District by the Kitsap County Commissioners.

== Education ==
Hansen received his bachelor's degree from Harvard University, and then studied theology at Oxford University, where he was a Rhodes Scholar. He received his Juris Doctor from Yale Law School.

== Career ==
=== Law ===
As an attorney, Hansen successfully represented cities in a lawsuit challenging air pollution. The Texas Clean Air Cities Coalition, a group of over 30 Texas cities, opposed the construction of a new petroleum coke-fired power plant. Hansen represented the cities, establishing that the air modeling used to support the proposed power plant was unreliable, and leading the power plant's expert to concede on cross-examination that he could "not say with certainty that any of the modeling that [he] testified about in connection with [the trial] was 100 percent accurate." After the trial, two judges recommended denial of the plant's permit, in a decision quoting from Hansen's cross-examination.

A significant part of Hansen's law practice has involved representing victims of financial fraud. He has represented the city of Baltimore, the lead plaintiff in litigation arising from the manipulation of LIBOR during the 2008-2010 financial crisis. He also represented small businesses alleging they were injured by financial arrangements in violation of the usury laws.

=== Politics ===
Hansen served in the Washington State House of Representatives from 2011-2023, where he chaired the Higher Education Committee (2014-2020) and the Civil Rights and Judiciary Committee (2020-2023). Hansen won several awards for his public service, including “Legislative Partner of the Year” (Association of College Trustees), “Legislative Champion” (Washington Public Utility Districts Association), “Nursing Champion” (Washington State Association of Nurses), and “Legislator of the Year” (Washington Student Association).

Hansen is the prime sponsor of the Workforce Education Investment Act, which created the Washington College Grant, a tuition-free college and apprenticeship program. Ed Trust called the Washington College Grant “the most equity-focused free college program in the country” and “a model for other states.”

Hansen is also the prime sponsor of the Public Broadband Act, allowing all local governments in Washington State to offer broadband directly to the public, which Ars Technica called “a victory for municipal broadband.”

After the Supreme Court overruled Roe v. Wade, Hansen sponsored the “Shield Law,” which protects Washington residents from anti-abortion laws in other states.

Hansen has led Washington's expansion of computer science education. He sponsored legislation (HB 1472) to encourage students to take AP Computer Science, which the Seattle Times called one of the "key education reforms" in the legislative session. Microsoft general counsel Brad Smith said Hansen's bill "represents an important step forward for our kids and for the technology competitiveness of Washington state." Hansen also sponsored legislation (HB 1813) to create statewide computer-science standards and a computer-science teaching endorsement and to expand eligibility for scholarships for students interested in teaching computer science. HB 1813 was supported by nearly every major technology company in Washington.

Hansen secured new funding for new electrical engineering and cybersecurity degrees, offered in an innovative partnership between a community college and four-year universities. He was also responsible for the funding expanding the University of Washington computer science degree program.

Hansen was the principal architect of Washington's legislation to protect marine and tourism industry jobs by cleaning up derelict and abandoned boats.

Hansen sponsored the first-in-the-nation law to restore net neutrality at the state level (HB 2282) after the FCC repealed net neutrality nationwide. The bill received widespread bipartisan support and was signed into law on March 5, 2018.

Hansen reportedly considered a bid for Attorney General of Washington in 2020, but did not run.
