= Lady Willie Forbus =

American politician

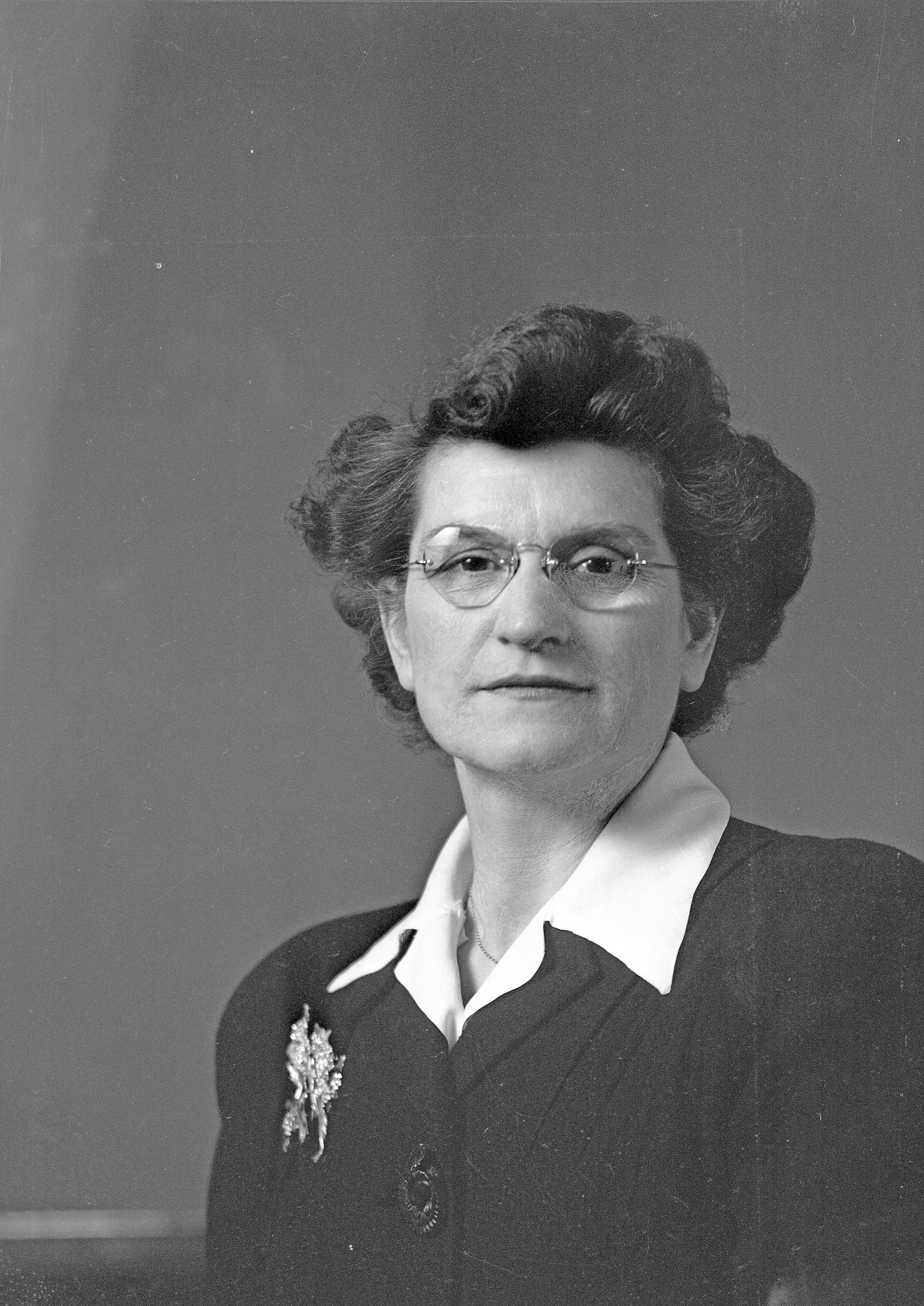
- Forbus in 1943

Member of the Washington Senate from the 44th district
- In office 1943–1947
- Preceded by: James T. Sullivan
- Succeeded by: Harold G. Kimball

Personal details
- Born: August 24, 1892 Zieglerville, Mississippi
- Died: April 27, 1993 (aged 100) Seattle, Washington, U.S.
- Party: Democratic

Lady Willie Forbus (August 24, 1892 – April 27, 1993) was an American politician in the state of Washington. A Democrat, she was a member of the Washington State Senate for the 44th district from 1943 to 1947.

== Early life and education ==
Forbus was born on August 24, 1892, in Zieglerville, Mississippi. Her parents were William Peyton Forbus and George Ellen "Birdie" Forbus (née Davis). Her name came from her father's name with, as was customary at the time for daughters named after their fathers, the addition of "Lady". Her father was the manager of several cotton plantations, although he was at constant risk of losing his job if the plantation was not profitable and frequently changed jobs. Her mother worked part-time as a music teacher, as well as raising cattle and selling eggs, butter and lard. Forbus had five siblings: Sample, Wiley, Edward, Bess and Juanita. When she was eight, the family moved to the Nitta Yuma plantation outside of Vicksburg.

As the second eldest, Forbus and her older brother Sample were sent to a larger town, Laurel, for their education when Forbus was fourteen as their mother was determined that they receive a good education. More than 150 miles away from their hometown, Forbus and Sample ran the household on the $25 (equivalent to $896 in 2025) monthly check sent by their parents, even after their four younger siblings joined them in the two-room house. Sample would receive the funds and distribute them to his sister to purchase the necessary household goods. Forbus would later say that her focus on equal rights began due to the discrimination she faced as a child.

Forbus's brothers graduated high school with university scholarships but the same aid was not available to female students, so Forbus worked as a stenographer for a local judge, Stone Deavours Barefield. She began studying at the University of Mississippi in Oxford. When she had an ear infection her junior year, she was unable to be treated at the university infirmary as a female student and was rendered dead in her left ear. She received her bachelor of science degree in 1915, having completed a four year liberal arts degree in three years. Determined to go to law school, she applied to Columbia, Harvard and Yale but was rejected from each, as none were yet admitting female law students. (Note: Sources on Forbus's life indicate that she was additionally rejected from Cornell, although they began admitting female law students in 1890. Yale would begin admitting female law students in 1918, while Columbia waited until 1926 and Harvard until 1950.) Instead she enrolled at the University of Michigan that fall as one of three female students, although she was the only one to graduate in 1918 with her bachelors of law degree. To fund her education, Forbus worked again as a stenographer, as a secretary for the highway engineering department and bought a $1,000 (equivalent to $21,405 in 2025) life insurance policy that she borrowed against and repaid each year. After graduation, she was told by the law school dean, "Goodbye, Lady Willie, someday you'll make a good stenographer for some lawyer".

== Legal career ==
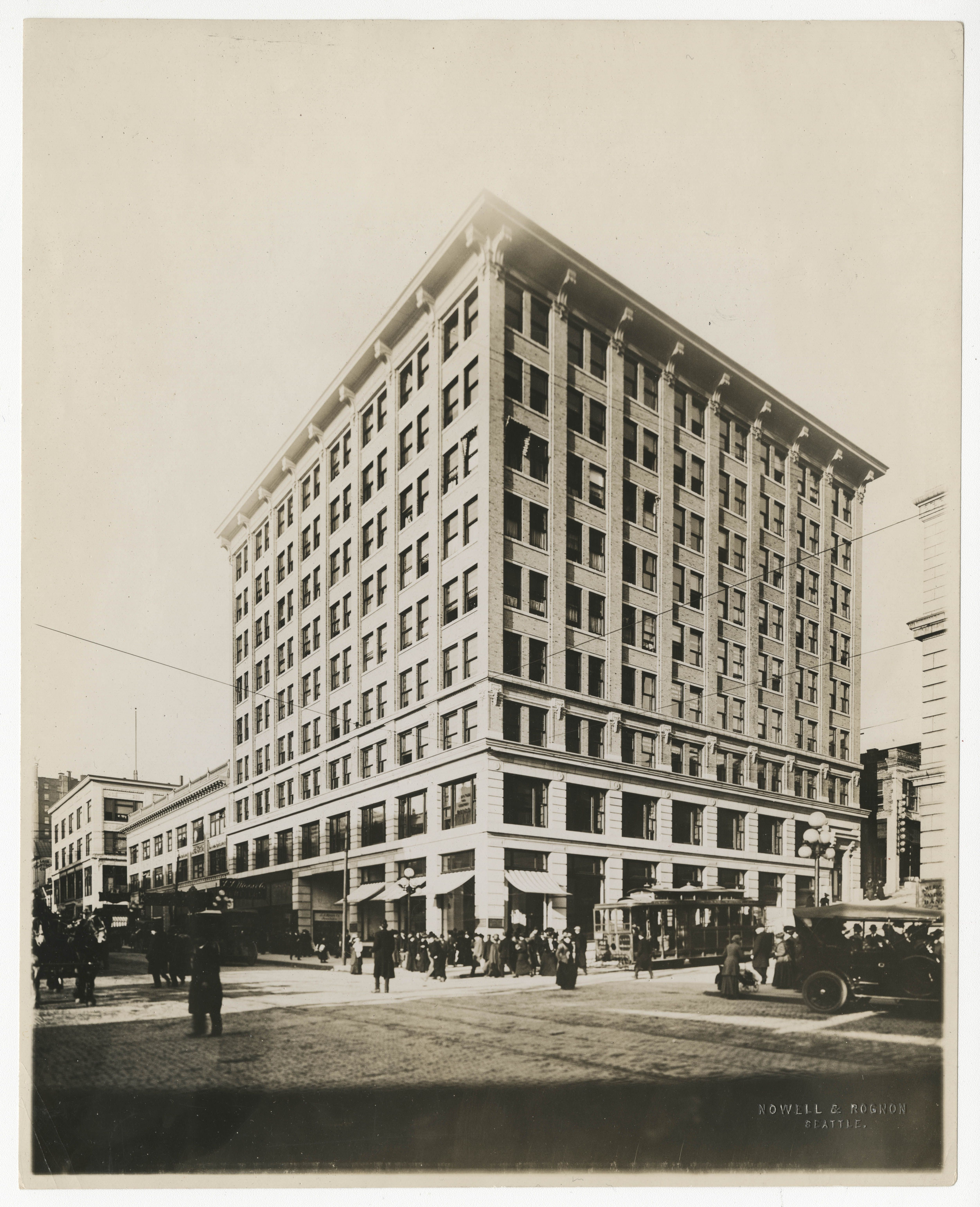
Leary Building, where Forbus's law practice was located, circa 1910

Forbus believed her legal career would be best placed if she went west and, using her law school's directory, she sent letters to lawyers in Cheyenne, Denver, San Francisco and Seattle asking for a job. Based on a response from a Seattle-based criminal lawyer, Walter Fulton, Forbus moved to Washington in 1918, immediately after graduation. She was prohibited from practicing in the state until she spent a year as a law clerk, a requirement in the state law as she had not graduated from the University of Washington. Forbus spent a year clerking for the local firm of Donworth & Todd (now Perkins Coie), and worked as a legal adviser for the draft board and secretary for the Military Training Camps Association. The law that prevented her from applying for her law licence was repealed during the year and on May 24, 1919, she was admitted to the Washington State Bar Association.

Forbus opened her own legal practice in September of that year in the Boston Block until it was torn down for the Seattle National Bank sixteen months later, when she moved to the Leary Building. Female lawyers were a rarity in Seattle but Forbus would later state that she was treated well and the state was "freer, more open-minded". Forbus's practice was the first woman-owned law firm in Seattle and she remained the only female sole practitioner for a decade, until 1929. Her practice area was wide-ranging, although she primarily represented individuals in property and personal rights cases. She worked on divorces and annulments, probate, criminal matters and business matters, including arguing a case before the state supreme court.

In 1922, Forbus began to receive public attention due to her handling of the murder of the police officer Charles O. Legate. He was found dead in his car in his garage on March 17 and the gunshot wound to his head led the coroner's jury to rule the death a suicide. His wife retained Forbus as her lawyer, since a death by suicide would mean she was not entitled to his police pension. Forbus brought the case before a grand jury and proved that the gunshots were inflicted by two different bullets and that the garage had been locked from outside. The grand jury overruled the coroner and declared the death a murder, which granted his widow access to the pension.

=== Entry into politics ===
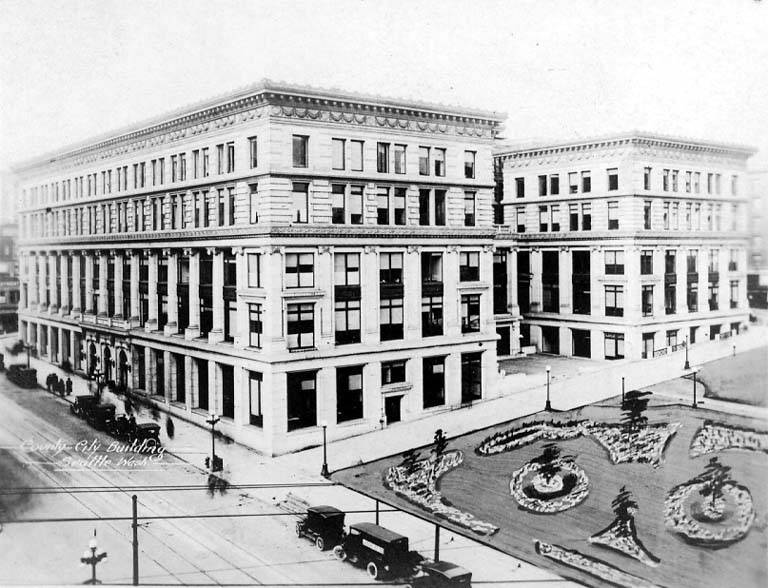
King County Courthouse in 1916

Forbus campaigned to become prosecuting attorney in 1922, unsuccessfully, but she began to make more speeches and become involved in politics. She testified on behalf of a child labor amendment being debated by the Washington State Legislature and supported an illegitimacy law, retirement benefits for educators and a state department of education. As lawyers could not advertise their practices at the time, these activities raised her profile in the community. During the Great Depression, Forbus struggled to maintain her practice and support her family.

In 1932 and 1934, Forbus ran twice to be elected to the King County Superior Court. She ran on a platform "that all laws should be construed liberally to meet the demands of the people who enact them and the purposes the law seeks to serve" and supported establishing one court to handle all family matters, including divorce, custody, adoption and paternity. Although she received the backing of women's groups, Forbus was determined to campaign on the basis of her legal career and humanity, not her gender; in one campaign speech, she said, "the highest qualifications of a judge are human kindliness and common sense in administration of justice. A woman, by nature and a mother, by experience and human contact, is especially fitted for the judiciary; for she brings to the bench not only legal knowledge but human understanding". She was considered a controversial candidate at the time and lost both elections, although she was the first female candidate in King County.

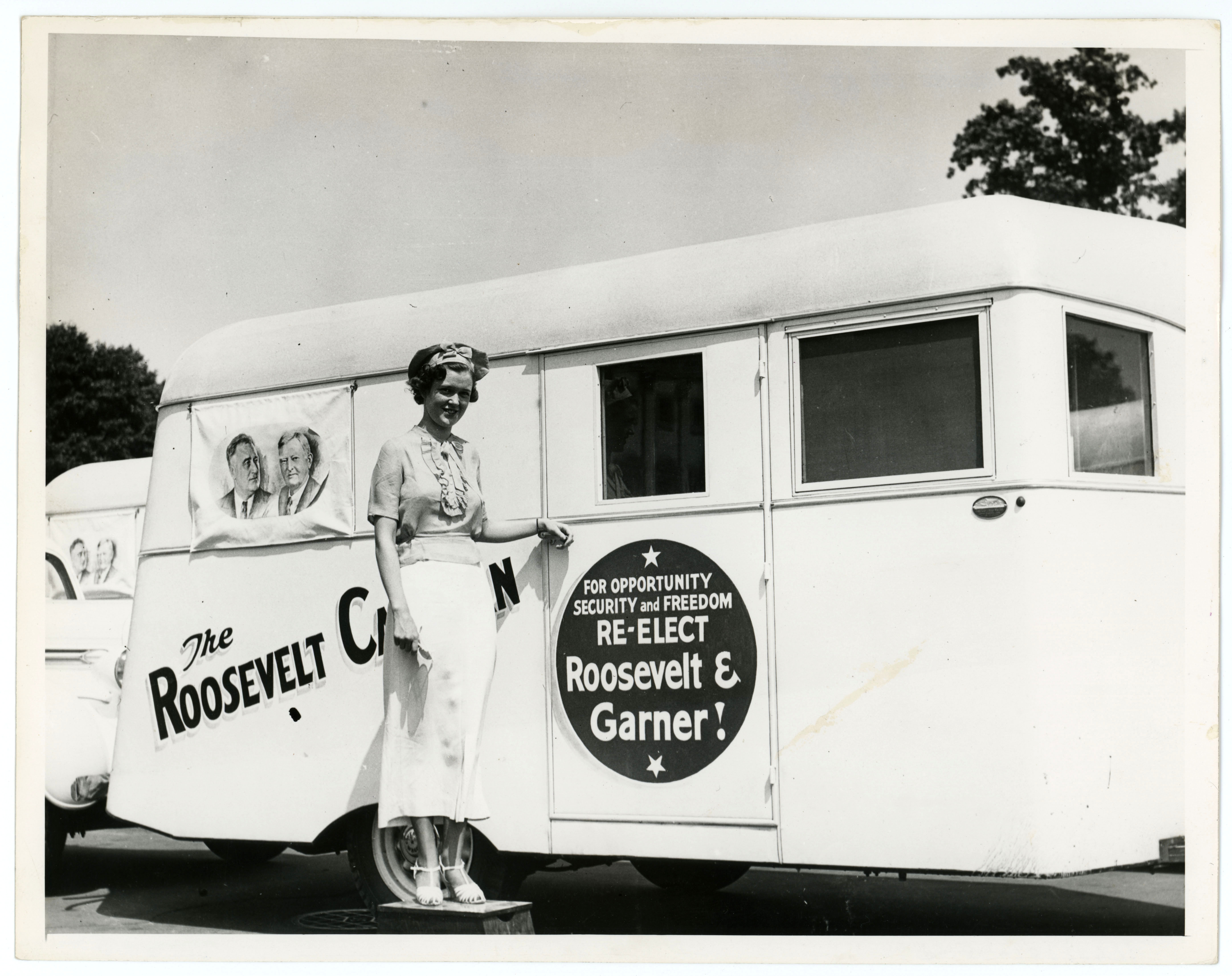
The Roosevelt Caravan in 1936

Despite her defeats for public office, Forbus continued to advocate for social programs and she became well known in Seattle and surrounding towns. She joined the Democratic Party and began working with the Women's Legislative Council to promote passage of the Twentieth Amendment and the Child Labor Amendment, including lobbying for these issues in Washington, D.C. during the 1930s. During this time, she began her support of the Equal Rights Amendment. Forbus participated in the 1936 Roosevelt Caravan, giving stump speeches at 40 towns in three weeks to speak in support of President Franklin D. Roosevelt. She was chair of the Democratic National Committee's State Speakers' Bureau. By the end of the decade, she was approached by the King County Democratic Central Committee to run for the Washington State Senate. Although her primary interest was in becoming a judge, she agreed to run.

== Political career ==
Forbus was elected to the state senate in the 1942 general election, as senator for the 44th district. While she was in session in Olympia, her daughters travelled with her and worked as a page and in the secretarial pool. Concurrently with her senate service, Forbus was an assistant attorney general for the Washington Department of Labor and Industries in 1943 and the Washington Fisheries Department from 1944 to 1946. The 1943 legislative session began with the allocation of committee assignments. The first and second set of assignments were rejected but the third list passed on a unanimous vote. Forbus was appointed chair of the cities of the first class committee. She became chair of the judiciary committee and a member of the appropriations committee. She sponsored bills on family issues, civil actions, health care, and housing. Nicknamed the "Steel Magnolia", Forbus was focused on policies to support children and women's rights. She passed legislation to eliminate the labelling of children born out-of-wedlock as illegitimate on their birth certificates and supported policies to improve worker's compensation, equal pay, a gradual income tax, and unemployment insurance. Considered a progressive Democrat, a friend described Forbus's politics as "an old-fashioned liberal populist with a marvelous commitment to social justice, but without cynicism."

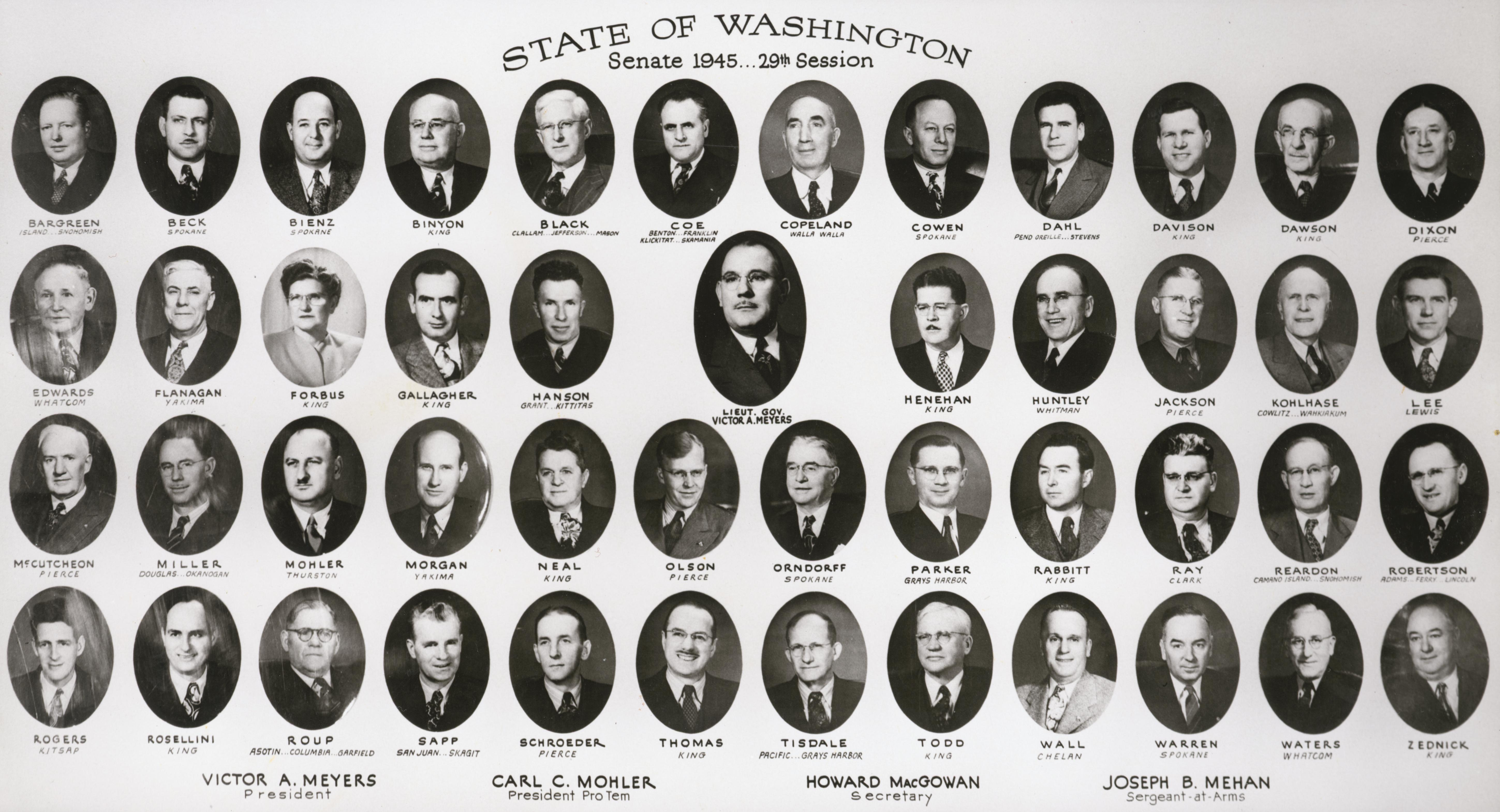
Forbus was the only woman elected to the Washington State Senate in the 1945 general election.

In 1945, Forbus was re-elected to the legislature for her second term; she was the only woman who had been elected to the state senate in the 1944 general election. She sponsored legislation with fellow senator Albert D. Rossellini to create a youth correctional authority. During her campaign, Forbus had received the support of a liberal group in Ballard, a neighborhood of Seattle, for supporting equal pay. Her connection to this organization led to her being publicly labelled as a communist. She faced Harold Kimball, who published the Ballard News and Magnolia Times, in the 1948 general election and he published ads in his paper opposing communism. She ultimately lost her re-election campaign.

== Personal life ==
Forbus married Alvaro Shoemaker, a journalist for the Seattle Post-Intelligencer, on June 18, 1921. Forbus retained her maiden name and the couple's two daughters, Alvara and Dale, were given hyphenated surnames, which was unusual for the time. The couple divorced in 1936 but remained close friends. In 1924, Forbus purchased a house in the Magnolia neighborhood of Seattle, where she would live for the rest of her life.

== Later life and death ==
After leaving the legislature, Forbus continued practicing as a lawyer. She remained active in the Democratic Party and in community activities. She was the party's precinct chair in the 36th legislative district, the first female president of the Magnolia Community Club, and president of the Ballard Business and Professional Women's Club and the Florence Crittenden Home for Unmarried Mothers. She was a board member of the Washington chapter of the American Lawyers Against First Strike Nuclear Arms and the American Civil Liberties Union. Forbus gave speeches on topics including "Educational Development in Colonial America", "Garden Planning" and "An International Bill of Rights." She travelled internationally, including to South America, Mongolia, China, and the Soviet Union.

In 1984, Forbus retired from legal practice. She died on April 27, 1993, in Seattle at the age of 100. Her papers are held by the University of Washington Libraries special collection.
