= Rainier High School (Washington) =

Coordinates: 46°53′10″N 122°41′20″W

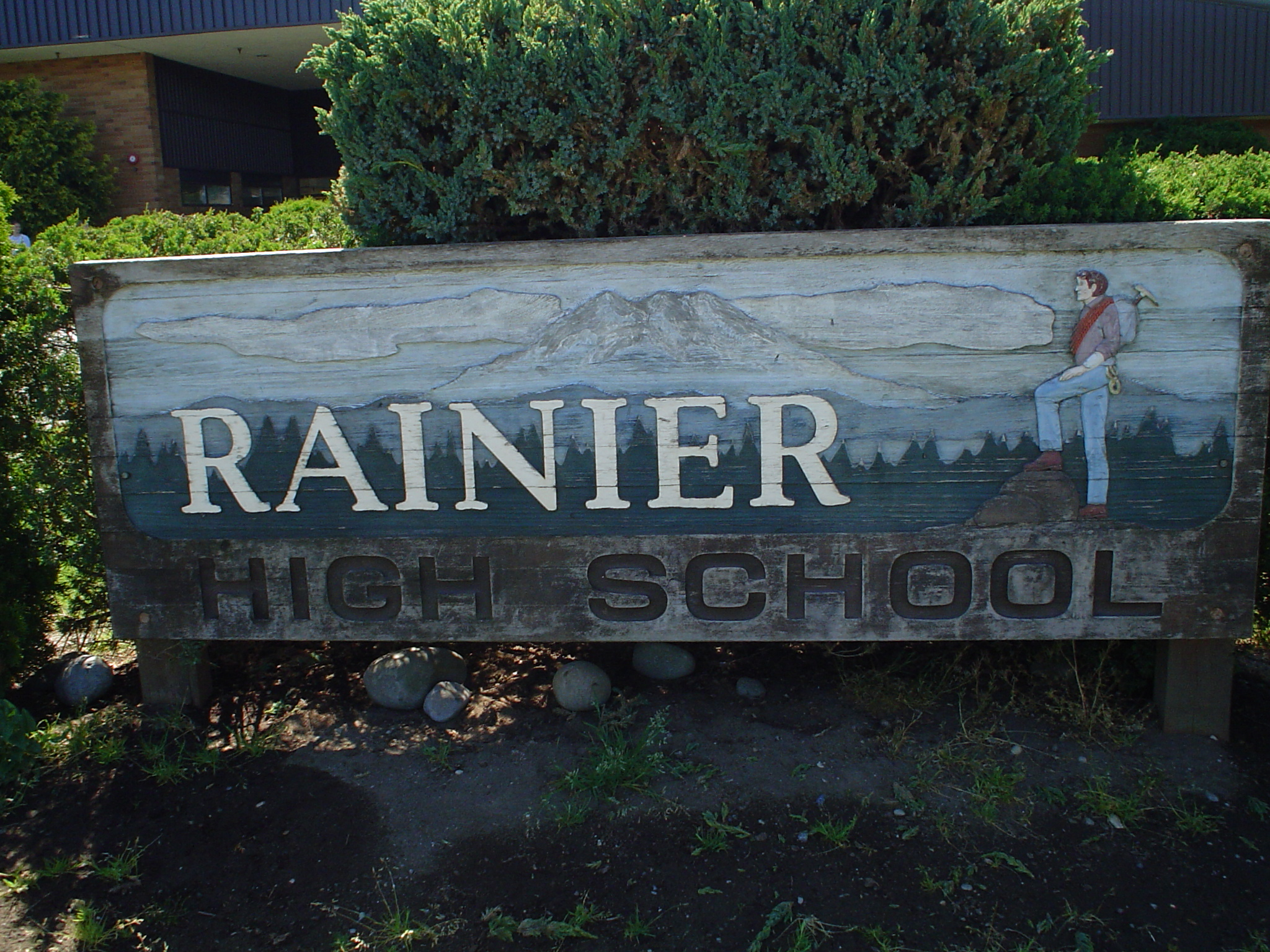
- Rainier High School

Location
- 308 2nd St W Rainier, Washington 98576

Information
- School district: Rainier School District
- Principal: John Beckman
- Staff: 15.00 (FTE)
- Grades: 9-12
- Enrollment: 267 (2023-2024)
- Student to teacher ratio: 17.80
- Colors: Orange & Black
- Mascot: Mountaineers
- Website: Rainier High School

Rainier High School, located in Rainier, Washington, United States, was established in 1909. As of the 2009–2010 school year, it provides instruction for approximately 300 students in grades 9–12 with a staff of about 20 full-time and part-time instructors. The school was named a 2007 Washington State School of Distinction based on its dramatically improved WASL scores. Its mascot is the Mountaineer and the school colors are orange and black. The current principal is John Beckman.

== Athletics ==
The Rainier Boys Track and Field team won the school's first ever team championship in 2022, led by University of Texas commit Jeremiah Nubbe, who won both the Shot Put and Discus at state.

The girls cross country team won their first state championship in November 2024 after winning both district and league titles. The state title was the first girls team championship in Rainier High School's history.

== Notable alumni ==
- Eloy Perez, '06 - professional boxer
- Chad Forcier, '91 - Assistant Coach for the Milwaukee Bucks
