= Chad Forcier =

Basketball coach

Utah Jazz
- Position: Assistant coach
- League: NBA

Career information
- High school: Rainier (Rainier, Washington)
- College: Seattle Pacific (1991–1995)
- Coaching career: 1994–present

Career history

Coaching
- 1994–1997: Lake Washington High School (junior varsity coach/varsity assistant)
- 1997–2000: Oregon State (assistant)
- 2000–2001: Portland (assistant)
- 2001–2003: Detroit Pistons (assistant)
- 2003–2007: Indiana Pacers (assistant)
- 2007–2016: San Antonio Spurs (assistant)
- 2016–2018: Orlando Magic (assistant)
- 2018–2019: Memphis Grizzlies (assistant)
- 2019–2023: Milwaukee Bucks (assistant)
- 2023–2024: Utah Jazz (assistant)
- 2024–2025: Phoenix Suns (assistant)
- 2025–present: Utah Jazz (assistant)

Career highlights
- As assistant coach: 2× NBA champion (2014, 2021)

Chad Forcier is an assistant coach for the Utah Jazz of the National Basketball Association (NBA). He has previously worked for the Phoenix Suns, the Milwaukee Bucks, the Memphis Grizzlies, and the Orlando Magic as well.

== Career ==
Forcier attended Seattle Pacific University, but did not play basketball there, graduating in 1995. During his time in college, he started his coaching career, joining the Seattle SuperSonics of the National Basketball Association (NBA) as an intern in 1992. He spent five seasons with the SuperSonics, working for head coach George Karl. From 1994 to 1997, Forcier also served as varsity assistant coach and JV head coach at Lake Washington High School in Kirkland, Washington. In 1997, he was named an assistant coach at Oregon State University where he spent three seasons, before moving to the University of Portland to serve as an assistant during the 2000–01 season.

In 2001, Forcier began to work as an assistant coach for Rick Carlisle in the NBA, spending two seasons with the Detroit Pistons (2001–03) and then four with the Indiana Pacers (2003–07). Since 2007 he has served as an assistant coach for the San Antonio Spurs, where he is responsible for player development. In 2014, Forcier won his first NBA championship after the Spurs defeated the Miami Heat in five games. On June 29, 2016, Forcier was hired by the Orlando Magic as an assistant coach. On June 15, 2018, Forcier was hired by the Memphis Grizzlies as an assistant coach. In 2021, Forcier, who was a Milwaukee Bucks coaching assistant from 2019 until 2023, won his second NBA championship after the Bucks defeated the Phoenix Suns in six games. Following head coach Mike Budenholzer's departure from the Bucks, Forcier would sign up to be an assistant coach for the Utah Jazz. He would stay at that position for one season before departing to join the Phoenix Suns as an assistant coach for Mike Budenholzer's new coaching staff there.

== Personal life ==
Forcier's brother, Todd, is the strength and conditioning coach for the University of Kentucky men's basketball team and his sister, Jade Hayes, is the girls' basketball coach at Bellevue Christian High School in Bellevue, Washington.
