= Rainier School =

NRHP-listed school in Rainier, Washington

- U.S. National Register of Historic Places
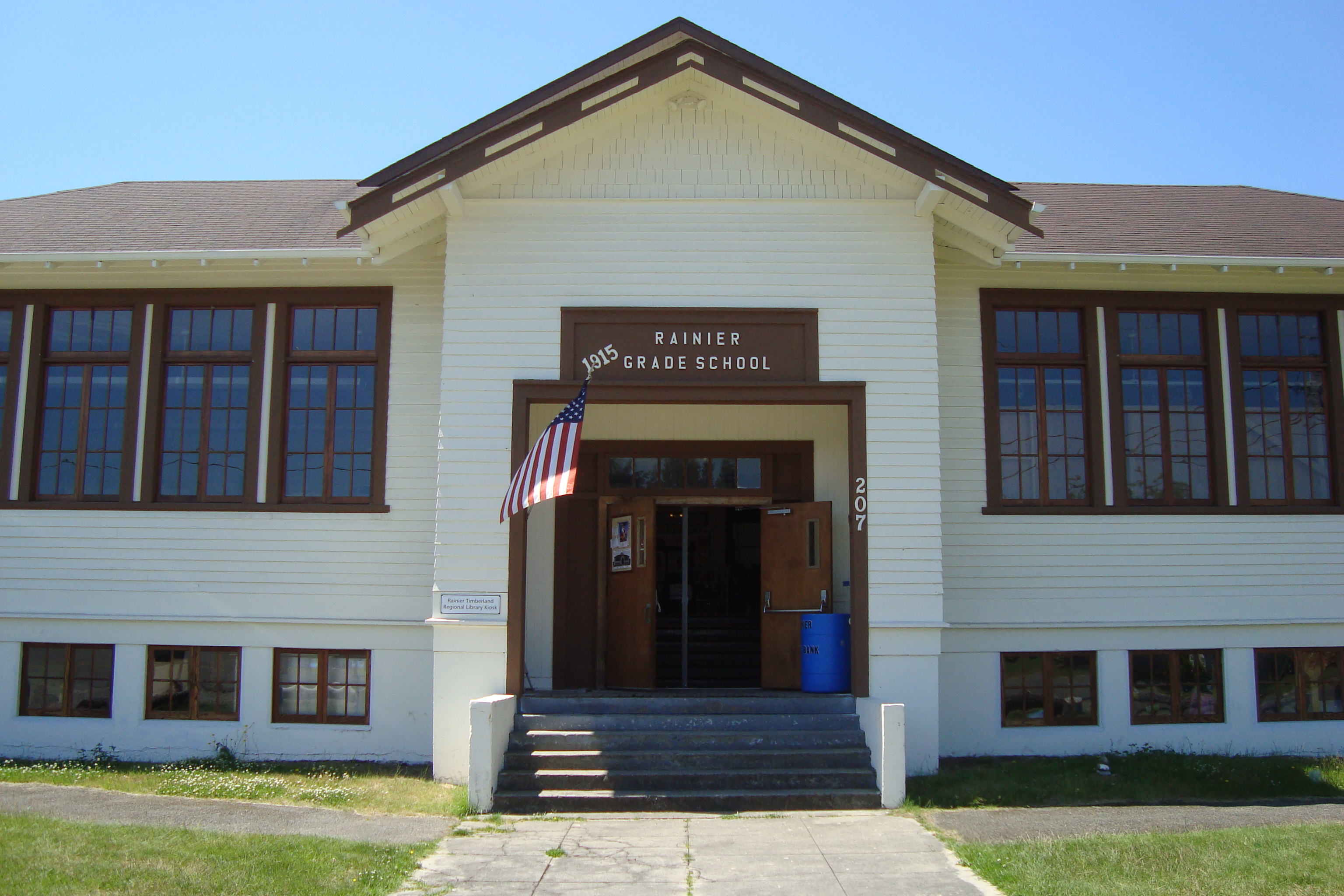
- Rainier School, 2010
- Location: Algyers and Centre streets
- Coordinates: 46°53′19″N 122°41′14″W
- Area: less than one acre
- Built: 1915
- Architectural style: Craftsman Bungalow
- MPS: Rural Public Schools of Washington State MPS
- NRHP reference No.: 04000159
- Added to NRHP: March 10, 2004

The Rainier School is an historic schoolhouse located in Rainier, Washington. The school was built in 1915 and was added to the National Register of Historic Places in 2004.

== History ==
In the early 2000s, the Rainier Historical Society, under the non-profit parent corporation of the Rainier Area Building Community, began restoring the 1915 Rainier School, listed on the National Register of Historic Places. The school was converted into a community center known as the Lifelong Learning Center. In 2005, the Rainier Food Bank was opened at the site.

A thrift store was also opened, with the proceeds going to fund the operational costs of the building. An art gallery and public meeting rooms followed. In November 2009, the Rainier Volunteer Library opened at the center, featuring a collection of donated books available for borrowing. A partnership with the Timberland Regional Library brought the addition of a computer kiosk and the ability to pick up reserved books from the Timberland Regional Library system.

In the fall of 2011, the food bank, under the name Rainier Emergency Food Center, relocated to a nearby church due to safety concerns at the historic schoolhouse. The building, which had been near demolition, was returned to the Rainier School District to be used for offices in 2015, its centennial year. The library and thrift store were closed. The school was further renovated in 2017 by the school district.
