= Moneythink =

American non-profit organization

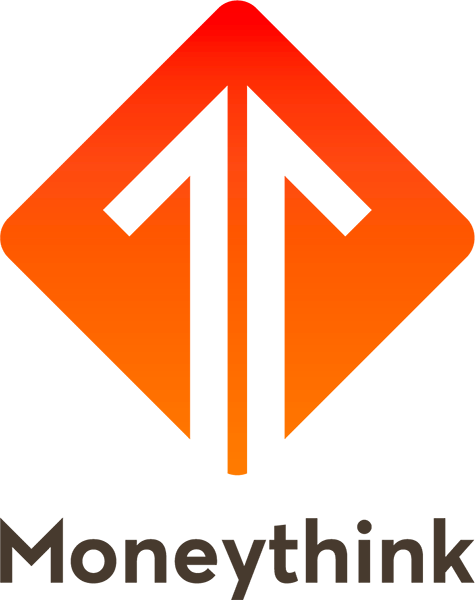
- Type: Nonprofit organization
- Industry: EdTech
- Founded: (September 1, 2008) in Chicago, Illinois, United States
- Founder: Ted Gonder, Greg Nance, Shashin Chokshi, Morgan Hartley, David Chen
- Headquarters: San Francisco Bay Area
- Key people: Joshua Lachs, CEO
- Website: moneythink.org

Moneythink is an American educational non-profit organization aiming to increase American youth's financial capability of American youth by training college volunteers to serve as financial mentors for low-income high school students.

Moneythink's curriculum involves the use of a mobile app to help students demonstrate their financial skills. The program also offers pre-professional activities for students to engage in, including business pitching competitions, job shadows, and visits to professional workplaces.

== History ==
Moneythink began as a student organization at the University of Chicago in 2009. Initially named the American Investment Fellows, the club was founded by students Ted Gonder, Greg Nance, Shashin Chokshi, Morgan Hartley, and David Chen. The group's aim was to help the South Chicago community in the wake of the economic collapse by recruiting, training, and placing undergraduate economics majors in local inner-city 11th and 12th-grade classrooms to teach financial literacy workshops.

In the fall of 2009, student-leaders at Washington University in St. Louis, USC, and other universities across the US began to work with the Chicago chapter and started identical clubs on their own campuses. Between the spring of 2010 and the fall of 2011 the concept spread to 24 campus communities nationwide. During this time, the campuses aligned under the collective name Moneythink and took on hundreds of volunteer mentors. Moneythink incubated at the Kauffman Foundation, where Ted Gonder professionalized the organization, and eventually gained official 501(c)(3) non-profit status.

In 2011, Moneythink named Gonder their chief executive officer and brought on board a full-time staff. In 2012, Moneythink received the White House Champions of Change award and set the goal of achieving mainstream financial capability among American youth by 2030. In the winter of that same year, the organization's logo was featured on the NASDAQ billboard in Times Square.

In 2013, Moneythink collaborated with IDEO to develop a mobile app to be used in classrooms along with the Financial Capability Curriculum. In 2014, the app officially launched for use in participating classrooms.

== Reach ==
Moneythink programs currently operate at 31 universities across the United States. The organization consists of over 600 student mentors and claims to have reached over 6,000 students.

== Recognition ==
- 2020 Capital One Nonprofit Give Back Partner of the Year
- 2019 Goldman Sachs Gives Analyst Impact Fund Finalist
- 2013 winner of the State Farm Neighborhood Assist grant.
- 2013 MassChallenge winner.
- 2012 winner of Chicago Innovation Awards Up-and-Comer Award.
- 2012 finalist in the Booth School of Business Social New Venture Challenge.
- 2012 winner of the White House's Champions of Change Campus Challenge.
