= Stone Barefield =

American lawyer and politician

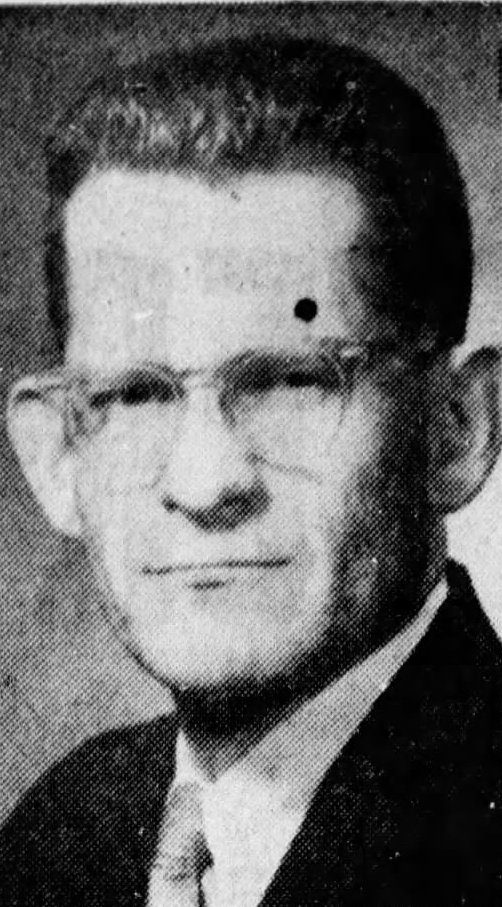
- Barefield circa 1962

Member of the Mississippi House of Representatives from the 103rd district
- In office January 1960 – January 1984

Personal details
- Born: July 28, 1927 Laurel, Mississippi
- Died: March 20, 2009 (aged 81) Hattiesburg, Mississippi

Stone Deavours Barefield (July 28, 1927 – March 20, 2009) was an American lawyer and politician. He was a member of the Mississippi House of Representatives from 1960 to 1984.

== Biography ==
Stone Deavours Barefield was born on July 28, 1927, in Laurel, Mississippi. He was the son of Samuel Stephen Barefield, Sr. and Dinah (Deavours) Barefield. He graduated from Hattiesburg High School in 1945. He graduated from the University of Southern Mississippi with a bachelor's degree in 1952, and then graduated from the University of Mississippi School of Law. He became a licensed attorney in 1954. He was a member of the Mississippi House of Representatives from 1960 to 1984. He died unexpectedly at his house in Hattiesburg, Mississippi, on March 20, 2009.
