= Rainier School District =

School district in Washington, United States

Coordinates: 46.92°N 122.95°W

Address
- 207 Center Street South Rainier, Thurston County, Washington, 98576; United States

District information
- Grades: Pre-K through 12
- Established: July 1, 1919; 107 years ago
- Superintendent: Bryon Bahr
- Schools: 3

Students and staff
- Colors: Orange & Black

Other information
- Website: rainier.education

Rainier School District No. 307 is a school district headquartered in Rainier, Washington.

The district's territory covers a total of 57 square miles (150 km^{2}) of area.

== History ==
Rainier School District No. 307 was established in the summer of 1919 following the voter-approved consolidated of Rainier School District No. 13, Mountain View School District No. 42, Oak Grove School District No. 47, and East Union School District No. 59.

== Schools ==
High schools

- Rainier High School

Middle schools

- Rainier Middle School

Elementary Schools

- Rainier Elementary School
