= Jason Saul =

American business theorist

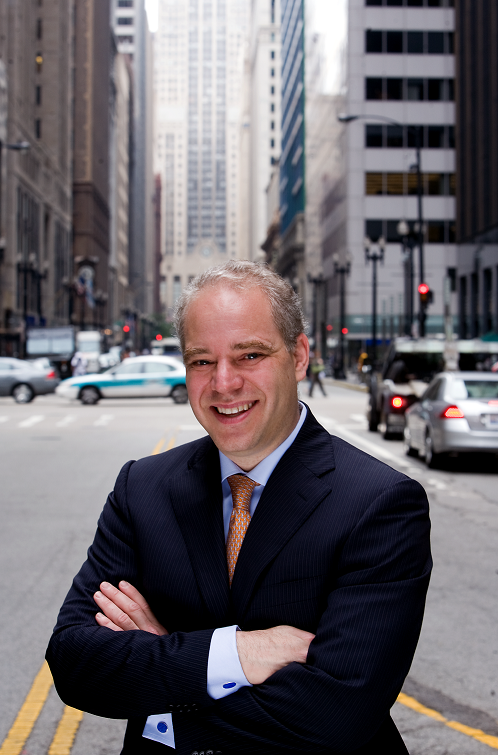
- Saul in 2010
- Born: June 14, 1969 (age 57); Chicago, Illinois
- Education: Cornell University, BA; The Harvard John F. Kennedy School of Government, MPP; University of Virginia School of Law, JD
- Known for: Founder, Mission Measurement; Founder, Impact Genome Registry
- Website: Jason Saul – Kellogg School of Management

Jason Saul is an American author, entrepreneur, and educator, best known as an expert on measuring social impact and benchmarking. He is the founder and CEO of Mission Measurement, a consulting firm that advises corporations, governments, and nonprofit agencies on their social impact. Saul was also the founder of the Center For What Works, a Chicago-based nonprofit organization that focused on benchmarking and performance measurement. In 2013 he founded the Center for Innovation and Public Value, a nonprofit organization that assists governments with getting value of its expenditures.

Saul is the author of three books and also serves as a lecturer of social enterprise at Northwestern University's Kellogg School of Management. In 2014, he collaborated with Nolan Gasser to launch the Impact Genome Project, a comprehensive research effort to codify evidence and predict outcomes of social programs. Saul has been recognized by Crain's Chicago Business as one of that newspapers 40 under 40 business leaders and was also named one of the Nation's 25 Most Promising Social Entrepreneurs by Bloomberg Businessweek.

== Early life and education ==
Saul attended Cornell University where he received his Bachelor of Arts degree in French literature and Government in 1991. From Cornell, he went on to receive his Master of Public Policy from the Harvard Kennedy School of Government, graduating in 1993 and serving as the elected Editor-in-Chief of the Harvard Journal of World Affairs during his time with the school. Saul then attended the University of Virginia School of Law, earning his Juris Doctor in 1996.

== Career ==
Saul began his career in the field of law. He worked for Mayer Brown LLP where he focused on public finance transactions for both government and nonprofit clients. During his time with Mayer, he co-founded the Social Investment Forum. The Forum partnered with more than 70 of Chicago's philanthropic groups and financial firms with a stated aim of creating social changes through capital markets. It focused on teaching responsible investing and getting Chicago corporations to invest locally.

Saul has written three books and numerous articles on social strategy and measurement. His first book, Benchmarking for Nonprofits, won the Ben Franklin Award for the Best Business Book of the Year, awarded by the Independent Book Publishers Association in 2005. Additional books include The End of Fundraising: How to Raise More by Selling Your Impact published in 2010, and Social Innovation, Inc.: Five Strategies to Drive Business Value through Social Change published in 2011. Saul's works have been published in numerous publications, including the Stanford Social Innovation Review, The Chronicle of Philanthropy, and Forbes.

Saul is best known as the founder of Mission Measurement, a consulting firm that advises corporations, governments, and nonprofit agencies on their social impact. As the CEO of Mission Measurement, Saul has advised governments, corporations, nonprofits and foundations that have included Walmart, Starbucks, McDonald's, Kraft, Levi Strauss & Co., Easter Seals, American Red Cross, the Smithsonian and USAID. Saul teamed up with Pandora's chief musicologist Nolan Gasser in 2014 to design the Impact Genome Project. Inspired by both the Human Genome Project and the Music Genome Project, the project analyzes data to predict the outcomes of social programs. The project has a database of 78,000 different data points and uses information collected from thousands of evaluation studies of social programs. The Impact Genome Project is based on Saul's original work in developing the first common outcomes classification for the social sector. The project has received criticism from some in the field, stating that there are too many factors to measure which makes it difficult to predict the outcome of all social programs.

Saul serves on the faculty of Northwestern's Kellogg School of Management, where he teaches corporate social responsibility and nonprofit management.

=== Bibliography ===
Year	Title	ISBN	Notes
2011	The End of Fundraising: Raise More Money by Selling Your Impact	9781118010051	2005 Benjamin Franklin Award Winner
2010	Social Innovation, Inc.: 5 Strategies for Driving Business Growth through Social Change	9780470892190	
2004	Benchmarking for Nonprofits: How to Measure, Manage, and Improve Performance	9780940069435	

== Awards and recognition ==
Saul's awards and recognition include the Harry S. Truman Scholarship for leadership and public service, awarded to him in 1989. Three years later he was selected as a Leadership Greater Chicago fellow. In 2008, Saul was recognized as one of Crain's Chicago Business 40 under 40 business leaders, and in 2010 he was named by Bloomberg Businessweek as one of the Nation's 25 Most Promising Social Entrepreneurs.

Saul was appointed by Illinois Governor Pat Quinn to serve on the task force for the Budgeting for Results Commission, which included testifying before the Illinois State Senate Appropriations Committee.
