= Ted Gonder =

American entrepreneur (born 1990)

- Born: Theodore Gonder; January 4, 1990 (age 36); La Crescenta, CA
- Education: University of Chicago
- Occupations: CEO and Co-Founder, Moneythink

Ted Gonder (born January 4, 1990) is an American entrepreneur and the co-founding CEO of Moneythink, a nonprofit organization dedicated to building the financial capability of young adults through technology-enhanced peer mentorship. Until July 2015, he was also a member of the U.S. President's Advisory Council on Financial Capability for Young Americans.

== Early years and education ==
After seeing Al Gore's film An Inconvenient Truth and attending the 2006 Hugh O'Brian Youth Leadership Foundation Seminar, Gonder launched Project Cooldown, a nonprofit that brought climate change awareness campaigns to high schools across his native California. In 2007, The Climate Project, an organization founded by Gore, appointed Gonder as a student advisor.

Gonder earned a BA in Geography from the University of Chicago. As a student at the university, he co-founded Moneythink as a service learning club. Gonder also founded the University of Chicago Entrepreneurship Society (now called Edge UChicago).

== Career ==
In 2008, Gonder, Shashin Chokshi, David Chen, and Greg Nance established the “American Investment Fellows” club at the University of Chicago based on Nance’s idea to send students from the university’s investment club into local high schools to teach workshops. After the success of a pilot program at the South Shore School of Leadership, the initiative began to spread to campuses across the country. In 2009, the organization was officially rebranded as Moneythink, at which point Morgan Hartley joined as the organization’s fifth co-founder.

In 2011, Gonder interned at the Ewing Marion Kauffman Foundation, where he researched the relationship between government and startups in Chile. After completing his assignment in Chile and returning to the U.S. later that year, he decided to pursue Moneythink as a full-time venture.

In 2012, Gonder spoke on behalf of Moneythink when it was named a White House Champion of Change, and declared that the organization’s goal was to make youth financial capability a social norm in the U.S. by 2030. He also became the organization’s first executive director.

== Honors and awards ==
- In 2015, Gonder was named to Forbes' “30 Under 30 in Finance”. He was the youngest person on the Finance list.
- In 2014, Gonder was named a Bluhm-Helfand Social Innovation Fellow by Chicago Ideas Week.
- In 2014, Gonder was named to Crain's Chicago Business's "Twenty in their 20s" list.
- In 2013, Gonder was awarded the Yoshiyama Young Entrepreneurs award by The Hitachi Foundation.
- In 2013, Gonder was named a New Leaders Council Chicago Fellow.
- In 2013, Gonder was named an Emerging Leader by TEDxMidwest.
- In 2012, Gonder was named a White House Champion of Change.
- In 2012, Gonder became a Kairos Society K50 entrepreneur.
- In 2011, Gonder became a StartingBloc fellow.
- In 2011, Gonder was selected as an Opportunity Scholar at the first annual Opportunity Nation Summit.
- In 2010, Gonder was awarded a Jefferson Award for Public Service for Outstanding National or Global Service by a Young American Twenty-Five Years or Under.
