= David Shimer =

American foreign policy analyst

David Shimer is an American journalist, author, and foreign policy analyst. He served on the White House National Security Council (NSC) during the Biden administration.

== Early life ==
David Shimer
- Education: Yale University (BA, MA); Magdalen College, Oxford (DPhil)
- Notable work: Rigged: America, Russia, and One Hundred Years of Covert Electoral Interference (2020)

Shimer graduated from Yale University with bachelor's and master's degrees in history. While at Yale, he was the editor in chief of the Yale Daily News.

In 2018, he received a Marshall Scholarship and attended the University of Oxford, where he received a doctorate in international relations.

== Career ==
In 2017 and 2018, Shimer reported articles for The New York Times from Germany, the Netherlands, Belgium, and the United Kingdom. In June 2020, he published the book Rigged: America, Russia, and One Hundred Years of Covert Electoral Interference (Knopf), a global history of foreign election interference. The New York Times, in its review of Rigged, said the book was "extraordinary and gripping" and had "the insight of a superb work of history." Rigged was also positively reviewed by NPR and The Guardian.

During the Biden administration, Shimer served on the United States National Security Council from 2021 to 2025, including as the director for Eastern Europe and Ukraine and as director for Russian Affairs. Shimer was closely involved in the U.S. response to the Russian invasion of Ukraine, including efforts to release U.S. intelligence on Russia's plans before the invasion and to deliver U.S. military equipment to Ukraine.

In January 2025, Shimer argued in The Wall Street Journal that the United States should continue providing aid to the Ukrainian military.

Shimer has worked as a research fellow at Yale University, Columbia University, and the Wilson Center.

== Selected publications ==
=== Articles ===
- "Germany Raids Homes of 36 People Accused of Hateful Postings Over Social Media". The New York Times, June 20, 2017
- "Germany Encounters Surge in Crime by the Far Right". The New York Times, June 28, 2017
- "Austria’s Top Court Upholds Seizing of Hitler’s Birthplace". The New York Times, June 30, 2017
- "Violence Erupts at Hamburg Protests: ‘Everybody Went Totally Mad’". The New York Times, July 8, 2017
- "Yale's Most Popular Class Ever: Happiness". The New York Times, January 26, 2018
- "Oxford Roiled by Invitation to Far-Right German Politician". The New York Times, October 31, 2018.
- "Smaller Democracies Grapple with the Threat of Russian Interference". The New Yorker, December 8, 2018.
- "Fake Islands Bring a Dutch Lake Back to Life". The New York Times, December 26, 2018.
- "With Drone Deliveries on the Horizon, Europe Moves to Set Ground Rules". The New York Times, December 31, 2018.
- "A Cold War Case of Russian Collusion: What the Investigation of a 1972 Stasi Operation Can Teach Us About the Mueller Report". Archive, Foreign Affairs, April 5, 2019.
- "Election Meddling in Russia: When Boris Yeltsin Asked Bill Clinton for Help". The Washington Post, June 26, 2020.
- "Peace in Ukraine Needn’t Mean Russian Victory". the Wall Street Journal, January 21, 2025.
- "Make Moscow Pay: The Case for Seizing Russian Assets to Fund Ukraine’s Defense". Foreign Affairs, May 21, 2025 (with Wally Adeyemo).
- "Ukraine’s Drone Revolution: And What America Should Learn From It". Foreign Affairs, July 7, 2025 (with Jon Finer).

=== Book ===
- Rigged: America, Russia, and One Hundred Years of Covert Electoral Interference. New York: Knopf, 2020. ISBN 978-0-525-65900-6
