= Greg Nance =

American politician, ultramarathon runner

- Nance running a 124-mile ultramarathon in Malaysia, March 2016

Member of the Washington House of Representatives from the 23rd district
- Incumbent
- Assumed office September 18, 2023 Serving with Tarra Simmons
- Preceded by: Drew Hansen

Personal details
- Born: Gregory Dylan Nance; September 29, 1988 (age 37) Redmond, WA
- Party: Democratic
- Education: University of Chicago (BA); Fitzwilliam College, Cambridge
- Occupation: Entrepreneur
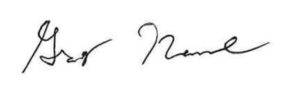
- Signature
- Website: http://gregnance.org

Greg Nance (born September 29, 1988) is an American politician, businessman, and ultramarathon runner. He is a member of the Washington House of Representatives and represents the 23rd district, which encompasses northern Kitsap County.

Nance is the co-founder and Board Chairman of Moneythink and the founder and former CEO of Dyad Mentorship. Nance has received awards for his public service and business leadership, including recognition from the Jefferson Awards for Public Service as a "Globe Changer" in 2011.

Nance is a long-distance runner, with 44 Fastest Known Time running records, including the speed record for the 86-mile Mount Rainier Sea to Summit run from Puget Sound to the 14,411 ft. summit. In 2016, Nance was selected as the Seattle Seahawks "12 Ambassador." He was also the face of a Delta Air Lines' Pacific Northwest marketing campaign.

In September 2023 Nance was appointed by the Kitsap County Board of Supervisors to represent the 23rd district in the Washington House of Representatives, succeeding Drew Hansen.

== Early life and education ==
Nance grew up on Bainbridge Island, Washington. He attended Bainbridge High School and participated in debate, baseball, basketball, soccer, football, tennis, cross country, and track. Nance became a “stand out” runner, “excelling in track." He completed his first marathon in college, qualifying for the 2011 and 2012 Boston Marathon.

He received an appointment to the United States Military Academy at West Point but chose to attend the University of Chicago, after being offered a scholarship. During college, Nance worked odd jobs including splitting wood, landscaping, roofing, and painting houses. While a junior at the University of Chicago, Nance was elected Student Government President and earned the 2010 Harry S. Truman Scholarship. In 2011 Nance earned a Gates Scholarship to the Cambridge Judge Business School. While at Cambridge, Nance boxed welterweight for the varsity team.

== Career ==
=== Moneythink ===
In October 2008, Nance, Shashin Chokshi, David Chen, Morgan Hartley and Ted Gonder established the "American Investment Fellows" club at the University of Chicago, what would go on to become Moneythink. Nance currently serves as Moneythink's chairman of the board. In recognition of his work at Moneythink, Nance was named a "Globe Changer" at the 2011 Jefferson Awards for Public Service and received the "2019 Young Alumni Service Award" from the University of Chicago.

=== Dyad Mentorship ===
In 2012, Nance founded Dyad Mentorship (formerly ChaseFuture), a mentorship platform that guides students through the university admissions process. Dyad helped students earn over $27 million in scholarships and helped over 2,000 clients from 25 countries including China, India, Egypt, Colombia, Honduras, Japan, Malaysia, Australia, France, England, and America. Dyad also advised one of China's four inaugural Rhodes Scholarship recipients in 2015.

=== Washington House of Representatives ===
Nance has represented the 23rd district in the Washington House of Representatives since September 18, 2023. He was appointed by the Kitsap County Board of Supervisors following Drew Hansen's appointment to the Washington Senate .

== Athletic career ==
Greg Nance
Personal information
- Height: 6 ft 0 in (1.83 m)
- Weight: 170 lb (77 kg)
- Website: http://www.gregrunsfar.com

Sport
- Country: United States
- Sport: Ultramarathon
- Events: 100 km, 100 mile, 250 km
- Club: Brooks
- Turned pro: 2018

=== Running ===
Nance ran his first ultramarathon, a 50 km on the UK's Jurassic Coast, in December 2011 and finished 10th place. He has since completed numerous international ultramarathons across the world, including a 250 km ultramarathon across the Gobi Desert in June 2014. He has completed the World Marathon Challenge. Alongside his father Mike, he completed the six-stage 250 km Atacama Crossing in October 2018.

Nance is sponsored by Brooks Running, Clif Bar, Delta Air Lines, and Wentworth. In 2017 Nance began publishing instructional articles on ultramarathon training and recovery for Brooks Running. As of 2023, Nance has set 44 Fastest Known Time running records in eleven countries.

=== Outdoorsmanship ===
Nance has summited peaks in numerous mountain ranges, including the Alps, Pyrenees, Scottish Highlands, Rockies, Tetons, Cascades, Olympics, and Tibetan Highlands. Nance grew up on the shores of Washington's Puget Sound and has been an open water swimmer since childhood. He has crossed some of the world's major rivers including the Nile (Egypt), Thames (UK), Seine (France), Douro (Portugal), Huangpu (China), Moskva (Russia), and Jordan (Israel). He has also swum the Persian Gulf, Aegean, Andaman, Marmara, Mediterranean, and East and South China seas.
