= Leonardo Martinez-Diaz =

American economist

Leonardo Martinez-Diaz (born October 28, 1976) is Director of the Sustainability, Climate, and Geopolitics Program at the Carnegie Endowment for International Peace, as well as a Senior Fellow. His fields of expertise include climate politics and diplomacy, climate finance, and mitigating and managing the risks of climate change to economies and communities.

Previously, Martinez-Diaz served as managing director for climate finance in the Office of the U.S. Special Presidential Envoy for Climate at the United States Department of State. In 2024, President Biden nominated Martinez-Diaz to serve as U.S. Executive Director on the board of the World Bank Group.

Prior to joining the State Department in 2021, Martinez-Diaz was the Global Director of the Sustainable Finance Center at the World Resources Institute in Washington, D.C. At WRI, he led a team of researchers working to promote the flow of public and private finance to environmentally-sustainable activities, including climate adaptation and mitigation. Martinez-Diaz is author, with Alice C. Hill, of Building a Resilient Tomorrow: How to Prepare for the Coming Climate Disruption (Oxford, 2019). He also served on the Climate-Related Market Risk Subcommittee convened by the Commodity Futures Trading Commission. He served as co-editor of the Subcommittee's final report, Managing Climate Risk in the U.S. Financial System.

During the Obama Administration, he served as Deputy Assistant Secretary for Energy and Environment in the United States Department of the Treasury. In that capacity, he represented the United States in key institutions providing climate and environmental finance to developing countries, including the Climate Investment Funds, the Global Environment Facility, and the Green Climate Fund. He also negotiated finance elements of the Paris Agreement on Climate Change and helped implement President Obama's executive orders on climate change and international development and climate change and national security.

Prior to that, Martinez-Diaz served as Deputy Assistant Secretary for the Western Hemisphere at the United States Department of the Treasury. In that capacity, he led Treasury's financial diplomacy with countries in Latin America and the Caribbean, which included initiatives to support those countries' efforts to promote economic growth, preserve financial stability, and improve social equity. Before that, he served as Director of the Office of Policy in the United States Agency for International Development. In the latter position, he oversaw the development of USAID's first climate change strategy and the Agency's first four-year Strategic Framework.

Before entering government, Martinez-Diaz was Fellow and deputy director of the Global Economy and Development Program at the Brookings Institution. He also served as deputy director of Brookings’ Partnership for the Americas Commission, as an economist at the International Monetary Fund, and as director of the High-Level Commission on the Modernization of World Bank Group Governance.

Martinez-Diaz is author of Globalizing in Hard Times: the Politics of Banking-Sector Opening in the Emerging World (Cornell, 2009). He is co-editor with Ngaire Woods of Networks of Influence? Developing Countries in a Networked Global Order (Oxford, 2009), of Brazil as an Economic Superpower? Understanding Brazil’s Changing Role in the Global Economy with Global Economy and Development Director Lael Brainard (Brookings, 2009), and of Studies of IMF Governance: A Compendium with Ruben Lamdany (IMF, 2009).

Martinez-Diaz specialized in International Political Economy, receiving a M.Phil. degree in 2001 and D.Phil. in 2007 from Magdalen College, Oxford University, where he was a Marshall Scholar. He graduated with honors from Northwestern University in 1999 with degrees in economics and political science and was a 1998 Truman Scholar.

== Bibliography ==
- Alice C. Hill and Leonardo Martinez-Diaz (2019). Building a Resilient Tomorrow: How to Prepare for the Coming Climate Disruption. Oxford University Press. ISBN 9780190909345.
- Leonardo Martinez-Diaz (4 March 2018). "Investing in resilience today to prepare for tomorrow's climate change". Bulletin of the Atomic Scientists. 74 (2): 66–72. Bibcode:2018BuAtS..74b..66M. doi:10.1080/00963402.2018.1436805. S2CID 149419528.
- Leonardo Martinez-Diaz (1 December 2009). "Boards of directors in international organizations: A framework for understanding the dilemmas of institutional design". The Review of International Organizations (4).
- Leonardo Martinez-Diaz (2009). Globalizing in Hard Times: The Politics of Banking-sector Opening in the Emerging World. Cornell University Press. ISBN 978-0-8014-5955-9.
- Ruben Lamdany; Leonardo Martinez-Diaz (27 July 2009). Studies of IMF Governance: A Compendium. International Monetary Fund. ISBN 978-1-4519-9719-4.
- Ngaire Woods; Leonardo Martinez-Diaz (14 May 2009). Networks of Influence? Developing Countries in a Networked Global Order. Oxford University Press. ISBN 9780199564422.
- Lael Brainard; Leonardo Martinez-Diaz (1 September 2009). Brazil as an Economic Superpower? Understanding Brazil's Changing Role in the Global Economy. Brookings Institution. ISBN 978-0815702962.
- Leonardo Martinez-Diaz (December 2005). "Strategic Experts and Improvising Regulators: Explaining the IASC's Rise to Global Influence, 1973-2001". Business and Politics. 7 (3).
