= Washington's 23rd legislative district =

American legislative district

Coordinates: 47°43′N 122°36′W

Washington's 23rd legislative district

Washington's 23rd legislative district is one of forty-nine districts in Washington state for representation in the state legislature.

The district includes northern Kitsap County and Bainbridge Island.

The district's legislators are state senator Drew Hansen and state representatives Tarra Simmons (position 1) and Greg Nance (position 2), all Democrats.

== See also ==
- Washington Redistricting Commission
- Washington State Legislature
- Washington State Senate
- Washington House of Representatives
