= Bethel, Washington =

- Census-designated place
- Location in Washington and the United States Bethel (the United States)
- Coordinates: 47°29′32″N 122°37′25″W
- Country: United States
- State: Washington
- County: Kitsap

Area
  - Total: 3.31 sq mi (8.57 km^{2})
  - Land: 3.31 sq mi (8.57 km^{2})
  - Water: 0 sq mi (0.0 km^{2})
- Elevation: 318 ft (97 m)

Population (2020)
  - Total: 4,073
  - Density: 1,122/sq mi (433.2/km^{2})
- Time zone: UTC-8 (Pacific (PST))
  - Summer (DST): UTC-7 (PDT)
- ZIP Code: 98387
- Area code(s): 360, 564
- FIPS code: 53-05735
- GNIS feature ID: 2584946

Bethel is a census-designated place (CDP) in Kitsap County, Washington, United States. Located a few miles south of the city of Port Orchard, Bethel is a wooded residential area. Most residents commute to Port Orchard or nearby cities. It was first designated a place by the Census Bureau in the 2010 census, at which time its population was 3,713. By the 2020 census, the population increased to 4,073.

== Demographics ==
Historical population
Census	Pop.	Note	%±
2010	3,713		—
2020	4,073		9.7%
U.S. Decennial Census; 2000 2010

Bethel first appeared as a census designated place in the 2010 U.S. census.

=== Racial and ethnic composition ===
Bethel CDP, Washington – Racial and ethnic composition Note: the US Census treats Hispanic/Latino as an ethnic category. This table excludes Latinos from the racial categories and assigns them to a separate category. Hispanics/Latinos may be of any race.
Race / Ethnicity (NH = Non-Hispanic)	Pop 2010	Pop 2020	% 2010	% 2020
White alone (NH)	3,011	2,999	81.09%	73.63%
Black or African American alone (NH)	85	64	2.29%	1.57%
Native American or Alaska Native alone (NH)	32	37	0.86%	0.91%
Asian alone (NH)	156	169	4.20%	4.15%
Native Hawaiian or Pacific Islander alone (NH)	41	53	1.10%	1.30%
Other race alone (NH)	7	41	0.19%	1.01%
Mixed race or Multiracial (NH)	158	377	4.26%	9.26%
Hispanic or Latino (any race)	223	333	6.01%	8.18%
Total	3,713	4,073	100.00%	100.00%

== Geography ==
Bethel is in southern Kitsap County and is bordered to the northwest by Port Orchard, to the north by unincorporated East Port Orchard, and to the northeast by unincorporated Parkwood. Washington State Route 16 forms the western edge of the Bethel CDP; the highway runs northwest 5 miles (8 km) to Gorst and south 23 miles (37 km) to Tacoma. Bremerton is 9 miles (14 km) to the north via State Routes 16 and 3. State Route 160 forms the northern edge of the Bethel CDP and leads east 5 miles (8 km) to Southworth.

According to the U.S. Census Bureau, the Bethel CDP has an area of 3.3 square miles (8.6 km^{2}), all of it land.
