= Johnny Can't Read =

Single by Don Henley

from the album I Can't Stand Still
- B-side: "Long Way Home"
- Released: August 3, 1982
- Recorded: 1982
- Studio: Record One (Los Angeles, California)
- Genre: New wave; rock
- Length: 3:24
- Label: Asylum
- Songwriter(s): Don Henley; Danny Kortchmar
- Producer(s): Danny Kortchmar

Don Henley singles chronology
"Leather and Lace" (1981)	"Johnny Can't Read" (1982)	"Dirty Laundry" (1982)

Official audio
- "Johnny Can't Read" on YouTube

"Johnny Can't Read" is the first solo single released by American rock singer Don Henley, included on his debut solo studio album I Can't Stand Still (1982). His then partner, former model and actress Maren Jensen, performs harmony vocals with Louise Goffin.

It reached #33 in Cashbox magazine and charted at #42 on Billboard's Hot 100 chart. The accompanying music video was very popular on MTV.

== Meaning ==
The song focuses upon reading illiteracy. The song also reflects Henley's respect for reading and his reading background. As he stated in the book Heaven Is Under Our Feet (1991),

"I began to read when I was five. My dad sometimes read me the 'Funny Papers' on Sundays and my mother, a college graduate and former schoolteacher, read to me almost every day from books. As I grew, she made sure that there was always reading material in the house that was suited to my age and ability."

As for his respect for reading, he stated, "American literature, like the air we breathe, belongs – or should belong – to everybody."

== Critical reception ==
Cashbox called it "a wry rockin' romp about the woefully inadequate education most kids receive, [that] doesn't point the guitar at anyone in particular but considers the possible results of a frustrating situation."

== Personnel ==
Musicians

- Don Henley – lead vocals
- Andrew Gold – keyboards
- Danny Kortchmar – baritone guitar
- Kenny Edwards – electric guitar
- Bob Glaub – bass guitar
- Mark Towner Williams – drums
- Louise Goffin – harmony vocals
- Maren Jensen – harmony vocals

== Chart performance ==
Chart (1982)	Peak position
Australian (Kent Music Report)	49
US Billboard Hot 100	42
US Cashbox Top 100	33
US Mainstream Rock (Billboard)	29
