= Miss Washington =

Beauty pageant competition

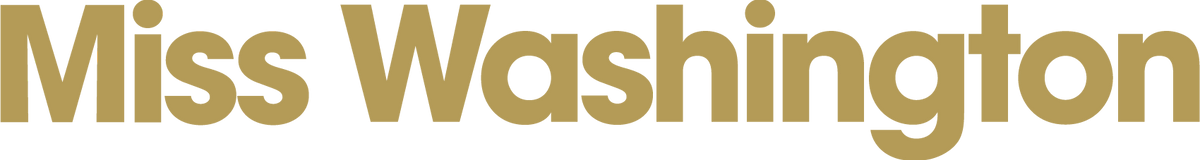
- Formation: 1926
- Type: Scholarship pageant
- Headquarters: Puyallup
- Location: Washington
- Members: Miss America
- Official language: English
- Key people: Peggy Miller (Executive Director)
- Website: Official website

The Miss Washington competition is the pageant that selects the representative for the state of Washington in the Miss America pageant.

Natalie Worthy of Battle Ground was crowned Miss Washington on July 11, 2026, at the Capital High School Performing Arts Center in Olympia. She will compete for the title of Miss America 2027 in September.

== History ==
Washington first sent delegates to Miss America in 1926 with Leona Fengler, Miss Seattle. She was sponsored by the Seattle Times newspaper, a practice common in the early days of Miss America pageants. She was pictured in the paper leaving in a biplane for her cross-country flight to Atlantic City, where she was voted "Prettiest Girl in an Evening Gown." In 1987, Fendler was featured again in the newly-revived Miss Seattle Pageant.

The Depression and war years caused sporadic participation by Washington contestants in the Miss America pageant, but the Miss Washington pageant was revived in 1948 and held in Ephrata, with a $1000 scholarship offered to the winner. In 1949 the pageant was a "financial flop" and the winner had to seek community donations to fund her appearance at Miss America. At the time the organization was so deeply in debt that the titleholder's tiara was nearly repossessed by the manufacturer.

From 1961 to 1997 the pageant was hosted by Vancouver, under a number of executive directors before moving to the Tri-Cities under the directorship of Chamber President, Dorothy Schoeppach. Under the direction of Schoeppach the local programs again grew from 9 to 22. Two years later the pageant moved to Tacoma under the directorship of Joan Dehn and Mike Shinkle.

The competition was held in Renton or Des Moines, WA beginning in 2008 under the directorship of Charlie VanTramp and then Peggy Miller and Patti Belik, except for 2021, which was held at Little Creek Casino Resort in Shelton, WA, due to pandemic restrictions. . In 2023, the competition as well as all of its annual events moved to the Capital High School Performing Arts Center in Olympia.

The Miss Washington Scholarship Organization is a 501(c)4 organization, and its scholarship arm, MWSO Miracle, Inc. is a 501(c)3, where donations are tax deductible.

== Gallery of past titleholders ==
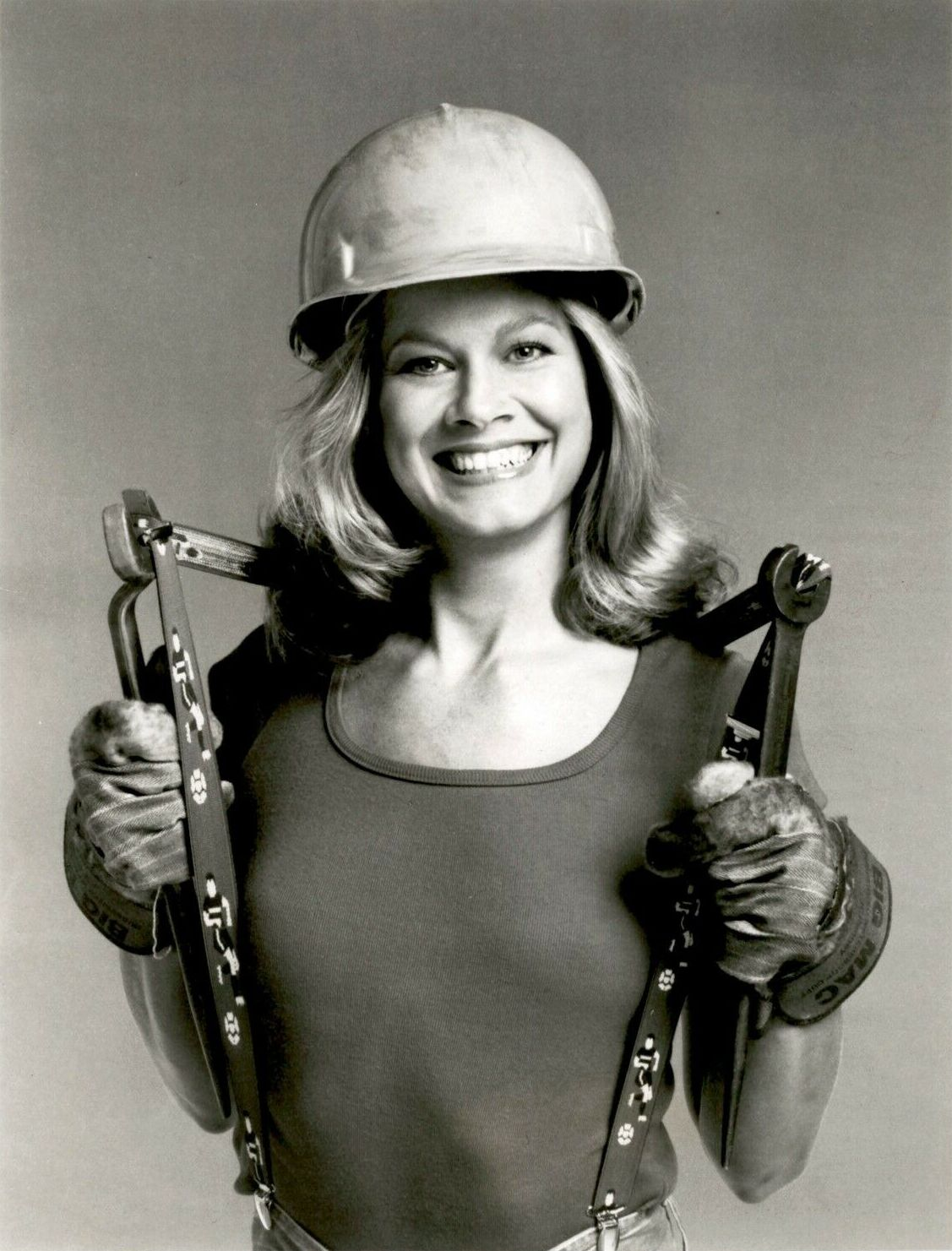
Susan Buckner,
Miss Washington 1971

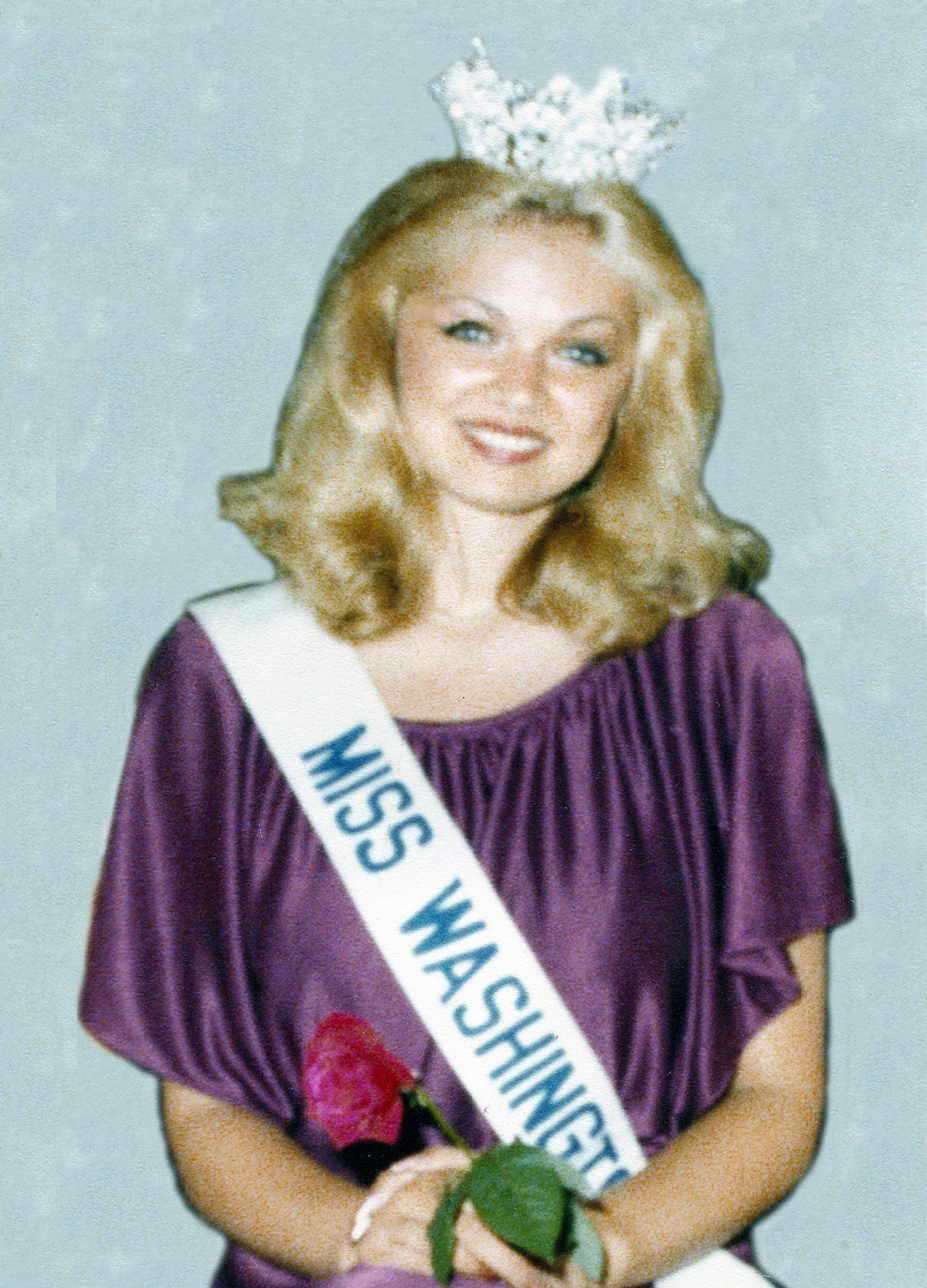
Laurie Nelson,
Miss Washington 1978

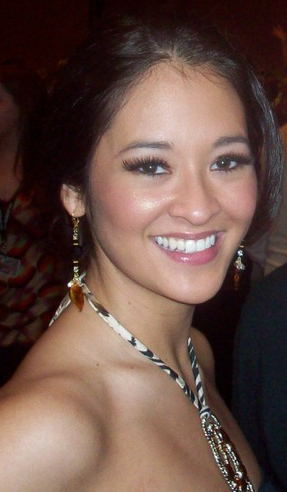
Elyse Umemoto,
Miss Washington 2007

== Results summary ==
Following is a summary of the results of Miss Washington titleholders at the national Miss America pageants/competitions. The year in parentheses indicates the year of the national competition during which a placement and/or award was garnered, not the year attached to the contestant's state title.

=== Placements ===
- 2nd runners-up: Anna Mae Schoonover (1939), Sharon Vaughn (1960), Sharon Rogers (1983), Elyse Umemoto (2008)
- 3rd runners-up: Honey Castro (1986), Jacquie Brown (2011), Alicia Cooper (2017)
- 4th runners-up: Laurie Nelson (1979)
- Top 10: Lauren Waddleton (1965), Susan Buckner (1972), Leslie Mays (1974), Kathleen Moore (1975), Doris Hayes (1981), Jennifer Wall (1990), SoYoung Kwon (1992), Kristen Eddings (2007), Mandy Schendel (2013)
- Top 15: Leona Natalia Fengler (1926), Amanda Beers (2003), Danamarie McNicholl (2019)
- Top 16: Karlyne Abele (1951)
- Top 18: Gladine Sweetser (1933)

=== Awards ===
==== Preliminary awards ====
- Preliminary Lifestyle and Fitness: Sharon Vaughn (1960), Susan Buckner (1972), Leslie Mays (1974), Kristine Weitz (1982), Mandy Schendel (2013)
- Preliminary Talent: Doris Hayes (1981) (tie)

==== Non-finalist awards ====
- Non-finalist Interview: Fianna Dickson (2004)
- Non-finalist Talent: Mardi Hagen (1964), Kippy Lou Brinkman (1966), Kristine Weitz (1982), Brittney Henry (2012)

==== Other awards ====
- Miss Congeniality: N/A
- Dr. David B. Allman Medical Scholarship: Honey Castro (1986)
- Miss America Scholar: Mariana Loya (1999)
- Quality of Life Award Finalists: Mandy Schendel (2013)
- STEM Scholarship Award Winners: Lizzi Jackson (2016)

== Winners ==
- Declared as winner
- Ended as a runner-up
- Ended as a finalist or semi-finalist

Year	Name	Hometown	Age	Local Title	Miss America Talent	Placement at Miss America	Special scholarships at Miss America	Notes
2026	Natalie Worthy	Battle Ground	23	Miss Greater Vancouver	Vocal			
2025	Amber Pike	Snohomish	24	Miss Spokane	Violin			Preliminary Evening Gown winner at Miss Washington 2025. First Runner Up at Miss Washington 2024. First Runner Up and Preliminary Talent winner at Miss Washington 2023. Competed at Miss Washington 2022.
2024	Hermona Girmay	Seattle	23	Miss Seattle	Vocal, "My Days"			Preliminary Evening Gown and Talent winner at Miss Washington 2024. Top 10 at Miss Washington 2023. Previously National American Miss Washington 2021-2022, Second Runner Up at National American Miss 2021-2022. Previously National American Miss Teen 2017-2018.
2023	Vanessa Munson	Battle Ground	23	Miss Clark County	Dance			Preliminary Evening Gown winner at Miss Washington 2023.
2022	Regan Gallo	Puyallup	23	Miss Pierce County	Dance			Previously Top 10 at Miss Washington's Outstanding Teen 2016. Third Runner Up at Miss Washington Volunteer 2022.
2021	Maddie Louder	Seattle	23	Miss Emerald City	Dance			Competed at Miss Oklahoma 2018, Top 16 finalist at Miss Oklahoma 2019. Later became Miss Washington Volunteer 2024 and Top 16 at Miss Volunteer America.
2019–20	Abbie Kondel	Brush Prairie	21	Miss Clark County	Power Tap Dance, "Sax" by Fleur East			First Runner Up at Miss Washington 2018. Top 10 at Miss Washington 2017.
2018	Danamarie McNicholl	Spokane	23	Miss Columbia Basin	Piano, "Curse of the Black Pearl" from Pirates of the Caribbean	Top 15		First Runner Up at Miss Washington 2017. Competed at Miss Washington 2016.
2017	Nicole Renard	Kennewick	22	Miss Rainier	Jazz Dance, "I Love Me" by Meghan Trainor			Previously Miss Washington's Outstanding Teen 2011 Previously Distinguished Young Woman of America 2013 Semi Finalist at Miss California 2016
2016	Alicia Cooper	Vancouver	21	Miss Clark County	Tap Dance, "Let's Get Loud" by Jennifer Lopez	3rd runner-up		Third Runner up and Preliminary Swimsuit Winner at Miss Washington 2014. Top 10 at Miss Washington 2013. 1st runner-up at Miss Washington's Outstanding Teen 2011 pageant
2015	Lizzi Jackson	Bellingham	23	Miss Rainier	Vocal, "This Will Be An Everlasting Love"		STEM Scholarship Award	Previously competed at Miss Washington 2014.
2014	Kailee Dunn	Kennewick	22	Miss Spokane	Vocal, "Someone Like You" from Jekyll & Hyde			Previously competed at Miss Washington 2012 and 2013.
2013	Reina Almon	Yakima	21	Miss Evergreen	Vocal, "I (Who Have Nothing)"			Previously Miss Washington's Outstanding Teen 2009 First Runner Up at Miss Washington 2012 and Contestant at National Sweetheart 2012 pageant
2012	Mandy Schendel	Newcastle	22	Miss Eastside	Vocal, "My Wish"	Top 10	Preliminary Lifestyle & Fitness Award Quality of Life Award Finalist	Was chosen 16th as the "Judges Choice" during the televised Miss America 2013 pageant Previously Miss Washington Teen USA 2008 2nd runner-up at Miss Washington USA 2012 pageant
2011	Brittney Henry	Puyallup	24	Miss Eastside	Fiddle, "Celtic Fiddle Medley"		Non-finalist Talent Award	First Runner Up at Miss Washington 2010 and Contestant at National Sweetheart 2010 pageant
2010	Jacquie Brown	Vancouver	21	Miss Greater Vancouver	Vocal, "Papa Was a Rollin' Stone"	3rd runner-up		
2009	Devanni Partridge	Auburn	20	Miss Seattle	Piano, "Malagueña"			
2008	Janet Harding	Yelm	21	Miss Tahoma	Piano			
2007	Elyse Umemoto	Wapato	23	Miss Seattle	Popular Vocal, "Angels"	2nd runner-up		First Runner Up at Miss Washington 2006 and 3rd runner-up at National Sweetheart 2006 pageant Contestant on Survivor: South Pacific
2006	Kristen Eddings	Silverdale	22	Miss Kitsap	Vocal, "For Once in My Life"	Top 10		Competed for Miss Washington 2002
2005	Tina Mares	Lynnwood	25	Miss Sno-isle	Classical Piano, "Nocturne in C-sharp minor" by Chopin			
2004	Allison Porter	Tacoma	24	Miss Seattle	Classical Violin, "Concerto in E Minor"			
2003	Fianna Dickson	Spokane	24	Miss Spokane	Jazz Dance, "Ac-Cent-Tchu-Ate the Positive"		Non-finalist Interview Award	Contestant at National Sweetheart 2000 pageant
2002	Amanda Beers	Richland	20	Miss Tri-Cities	Classical Piano, "Sonata Opus 31" by Beethoven	Top 15		
2001	Breann Parriott	Puyallup	23	Miss Pierce County	Contemporary Ballet en Pointe, Music from West Side Story			Later Miss Washington USA 2003
2000	Semmelle Ford	Tacoma	19	Miss Pierce County	Classical Vocal, "Art Is Calling for Me" from The Enchantress by Victor Herbert			
1999	Tina Willis	Tacoma	20	Miss Pierce County	Vocal, "Remember Me"			
1998	Mariana Loya	Tacoma	19	Miss Pierce County	Classical Violin, "Concerto in E Minor"		Miss America Scholar	Later Miss Arizona USA 2005
1997	Monta Monique	Pasco	24	Miss Seattle	Classical Piano, "Rigoletto Paraphrase" by Franz Liszt			
1996	Janet Reasons	Port Orchard	22	Miss Pierce County	Semi-classical Vocal, "Half a Moment" from By Jeeves			
1995	Amber Hamilton	Auburn	18	Miss Auburn	Jazz Dance, "Last Dance"			
1994	Annalee Klein	Enumclaw	24	Miss SeaTac	Country Vocal, "Sweet Dreams"			
1993	Teri Ann Plante	Normandy Park	22	Miss Whatcom County	Tap Dance			
1992	Colleen Kearney	Bellevue	26	Miss Issaquah	Jazz Piano, "Dizzy Fingers" by Zez Confrey			
1991	SoYoung Kwon	Olympia	22	Miss Seattle	Classical Piano, "Mephisto Waltz"	Top 10		
1990	Lynnae Thurik	Lake Oswego, Oregon	26	Miss Clark County	Classical Piano			
1989	Jennifer Wall	Issaquah	20	Miss Issaquah	Piano, "Opus 706" by Carl Wilhelm Kern	Top 10		
1988	Talia Watland	Poulsbo	24	Miss Seattle	Vocal, "Pour on the Power"			
1987	Sharon Dean	Issaquah	21	Miss Issaquah	Vocal Medley			
1986	Melanie Cobb	Vancouver	24	Miss Clark County	Vocal, "Let's Hear It For Me" from Funny Lady			
1985	Honey Castro	Moses Lake	19	Miss Moses Lake	Vocal, "What Did I Have I Don't Have Now" from On a Clear Day You Can See Forever	3rd runner-up	Dr. David B. Allman Medical Scholarship	
1984	Rebecca Wood	Spokane	21	Miss Greater Tacoma	Vocal, "If I Ruled the World"			
1983	Jennifer Havlin	Bellingham	24	Miss Whatcom County	Character Ballet, "On Golden Pond"			
1982	Monica Hard	Bellevue	23	Miss Burien	Vocal Medley, "Sweet Inspiration" & "Where You Lead"			
1981	Kristine Weitz	Moses Lake	19	Miss Tri-Cities	Jazz Vocal, "Summertime"		Preliminary Swimsuit Award Non-finalist Talent Award	
1980	Doris Hayes	Tacoma	20	Miss Pierce County	Jazz Vocal, "Love Is Here to Stay"	Top 10	Preliminary Talent Award (tie)	First African American preliminary winner
1979	Janelle Martz	Normandy Park	22	Miss Des Moines	Classical Piano, "Piano Concerto in A Minor" by Edvard Grieg			
1978	Laurie Nelson	Gig Harbor	19	Miss Pierce County	Vocal, "Have I Stayed Too Long At the Fair?"	4th runner-up		
1977	Natasha Solovjev	Burien	19	Miss Burien	Classical Piano, Piano Concerto No. 1 by Tchaikovsky			
1976	Theresa Adams	Wenatchee	19	Miss Greater Wenatchee	Classical Piano, "Prelude in G minor" by Rachmaninoff			Assumed to the title after Lambert resigned
1976	Sharon Lambert	Tacoma		Miss Pierce County		Unable to compete; later resigned after facing a shoplifting charge		
1975	Lee Ann Hibbert	Shoreline	22	Miss Northshore	Vocal / Jazz Improvisation, "That's a Fine Kind O' Freedom"			
1974	Charlene Myers	Burien		Miss Burien		Did not compete; originally 1st runner-up, later assumed the title after Moore resigned		
1974	Kathleen Moore	Bothell	22	Miss Northshore	Classical Vocal, "Italian Street Song"	Top 10		Later resigned
1973	Leslie Mays	Mercer Island	23	Miss Bellevue	Jazz Dance, "The 'In' Crowd"	Top 10	Preliminary Swimsuit Award	
1972	Rebecca Pozzi	Kent	20	Miss Kent	Vocal Medley, "Consider Yourself" & "I'd Do Anything"			
1971	Susan Buckner	Burien	19	Miss Burien	Gymnastics Dance, "The Joker"	Top 10	Preliminary Swimsuit Award	Played Patty Simcox in the film, Grease
1970	Nancy Peterson	Moses Lake	19	Miss Moses Lake	Original Comedy Monologue, "Once Upon a Leaf"			
1969	Marsha Covey	Moses Lake	19	Miss Moses Lake	Vocal Medley, "Love Come Again" & "That's Life"			
1968	Joyce Stepanek	Issaquah	20	Miss Issaquah	Comedy Routine, "The Adventures of Huck Finn"			
1967	Lynda Kilp	White Center	19	Miss White Center	Vocal Medley, "One Boy" & "A Lot of Livin To Do" from Bye Bye Birdie			
1966	Sandra Marth	Centralia	19	Miss Lewis County	Semi-classical Vocal, "Habanera"			Third runner-up at Miss Washington 1965
1965	Kippy Lou Brinkman	Richland	21	Miss Seattle	Harp & Tap Dance, "Night and Day"		Non-finalist Talent Award	
1964	Lauren Elaine "Lani" Waddleton	Burien	19	Miss Burien	Vocal, "I Could Have Danced All Night" from My Fair Lady	Top 10		
1963	Mardi Hagen	Tacoma		Miss Seattle	Modern & Classical Character Dance		Non-finalist Talent Award	
1962	Susan English	Bellevue	19	Miss Bellevue	Dramatic Reading			
1961	Gail Hannuk	Aberdeen	18	Miss Grays Harbor	Piano, "Warsaw Concerto"			
1960	Connie Hughes	Bellingham	18	Miss Bellingham	Original Monologue			
1959	Sharon Vaughn	Port Orchard	21	Miss South Kitsap	Vocal Medley, "Habanera" & "I Cain't Say No"	2nd runner-up	Preliminary Swimsuit Award	
1958	Anne Henderson	Spokane		Miss Spokane	Pantomime & Charleston Dance			
1957	No Washington representative at Miss America pageant							
1956	Deanna Hall	Olympia			Dance			
1955	No Washington representative at Miss America pageant							
1954	Frances M. Graham	Spokane	21		Vocal			
1953	Geraldine Lindsey	Seattle			Vocal			
1952	No Washington representative at Miss America pageant							
1951	Darlene Shaffer	Seattle			Dress Design			
1950	Karlyne Abele	Des Moines			Dramatic Reading, "The Flag"	Top 16		
1949	Libby Aldrich	Kelso			Vocal, "Stormy Weather"			
1948	Lorraine Lowder	Aberdeen		Miss Grays Harbor	Hula dance			
1947	No Washington representative at Miss America pageant							
1946	No Washington representative at Miss America pageant							
1945	No Washington representative at Miss America pageant							
1944	No Washington representative at Miss America pageant							
1943	No Washington representative at Miss America pageant							
1942	No Washington representative at Miss America pageant							
1941	No Washington representative at Miss America pageant							
1940	Peggy Mason	Tacoma						
1939	Anna Mae Schoonover	Seattle			Dramatic Monologue from Accent on Youth	2nd runner-up		
1938	No Washington representative at Miss America pageant							
1937	Juliana Bernhardt	Seattle		Miss Seattle				Competed under local title at Miss America pageant
1936	No Washington representative at Miss America pageant							
1935	No Washington representative at Miss America pageant							
1934	No national pageant was held							
1933	Gladine Sweetser	Seattle	22			Top 18		
1932	No national pageants were held							
1931	No national pageants were held							
1930	No national pageants were held							
1929	No national pageants were held							
1928	No national pageants were held							
1927	Eleanor Maddieux	Seattle		Miss Seattle				Multiple Washington representatives Contestants competed under local title at Miss America pageant
1927	Eva King	Spokane		Miss Spokane				Multiple Washington representatives Contestants competed under local title at Miss America pageant
1926	Leona Fengler	Seattle		Miss Seattle		Top 15		Multiple Washington representatives Contestants competed under local title at Miss America pageant
1926	Gloria Smith	Spokane		Miss Spokane				Multiple Washington representatives Contestants competed under local title at Miss America pageant
1926	Dorothy Rothermell	Tacoma		Miss Tacoma				Multiple Washington representatives Contestants competed under local title at Miss America pageant
1925	Evelyn Carman	Seattle		Miss Seattle				Competed under local title at Miss America pageant
1924	No Washington representative at Miss America pageant							
1923	No Washington representative at Miss America pageant							
1922	Evelyn Atkinson	Seattle		Miss Seattle				Competed under local title at Miss America pageant
1921	No Washington representative at Miss America pageant							
