= Kitsap Transit =

Local public transit operator in Kitsap County, Washington

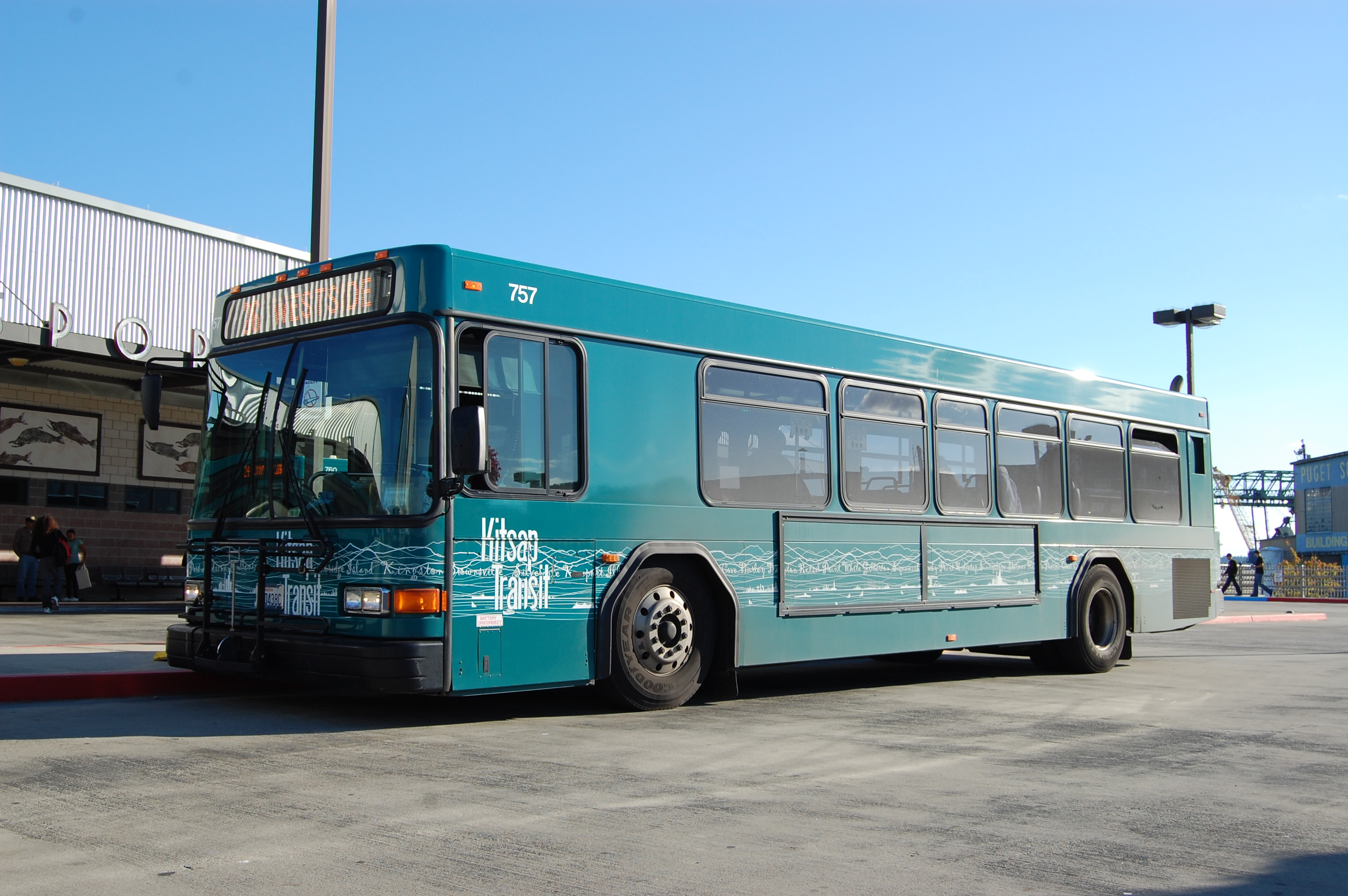
- Kitsap Transit Bus 757 at the Washington State Ferry terminal in Bremerton
- Founded: 1978
- Commenced operation: 1983
- Headquarters: Bremerton, Washington
- Locale: Kitsap County, Washington
- Service type: Bus, passenger ferry, vanpool, paratransit
- Routes: 40
- Hubs: 9
- Fleet: 136 buses, 9 ferries
- Daily ridership: 9,901 (weekdays, 2023)
- Annual ridership: 3,081,900 (2025)
- Fuel type: Diesel, electric
- Operator: Kitsap County Public Transportation Benefit Area Authority
- Executive director: John Clauson
- Employees: 462 (2024)
- Website: www.kitsaptransit.com

Kitsap Transit is a public transit agency serving Kitsap County, Washington, part of the Seattle metropolitan area. The system is based in Bremerton and operates bus service on 40 fixed routes, two local passenger ferry routes, a vanpool system, worker-driver services, and dial-a-ride paratransit. The Kitsap Fast Ferries, also operated by Kitsap Transit, launched in 2017 and has three routes that connect Seattle to Kitsap County. In 2025, the system had a total ridership of 3,081,900 and nearly 10,000 passengers on an average weekday in 2023.

== History ==
Beginning in 1971, the city of Bremerton operated a municipal transit system that had been bought out from a private company.

A countywide public transportation benefit area (PTBA) was formed in 1978 to explore a transit system for Kitsap County as a whole. A 0.2 percent sales tax was put before voters in May of that year for a countywide system, but was rejected. A second attempt was put on the September 27, 1982 ballot, with a 0.3 percent sales tax and a limited PTBA serving Bremerton, Gorst, Port Orchard, Poulsbo and Silverdale. The PTBA was approved by 55.6 percent of voters, and service began in January 1983, taking over the Bremerton municipal system.

In 1992, Kitsap Transit became the first transit agency in the United States to install a traffic signal preemption system for bus priority, beginning with 40 buses and 42 traffic signals in a year-long trial of the "Opticom" system.

Kitsap Transit formed a public-private partnership with Kitsap Ferry Company to operate a passenger ferry service between Bremerton and Seattle in 2004, replacing a former Washington State Ferries passenger run that was suspended the previous year. The service was suspended in 2007, after voters rejected a sales tax increase to fund the ferry's rising fuel costs. Kitsap Transit, looking to revive the service, placed a 0.3 percent sales tax on the November 2016 ballot to fund fast ferry service, which was passed by voters. The new Kitsap Fast Ferries service began operation on July 10, 2017, traveling 28 minutes between Bremerton and Seattle. A second fast ferry route, connecting Kingston to Seattle, began operating in November 2018.

In 2002, Kitsap Transit purchased Horluck Transportation, the operators of a foot ferry from Bremerton to Port Orchard and Annapolis, for $1.52 million.

During a period of declining sales tax revenue following the Great Recession, Kitsap Transit made major service cuts to make up for a budget shortfall. Sunday and holiday service was discontinued in February 2009, low-performing routes were consolidated or eliminated later that year. Fares were raised twice to $2, and employees were laid off.

In 2015, Kitsap Transit tested a double-decker bus from Alexander Dennis on routes serving ferry runs. The agency debuted a new battery electric bus manufactured by Proterra in April 2018.

== Services ==
Kitsap Transit oversees the operations of these services:

- Routed bus service (40 routes; 120 buses)
- Foot ferry service (Bremerton to Port Orchard and Annapolis)
- Fast ferry service (Bremerton, Southworth, and Kingston to Seattle)
- ACCESS (Door-to-door/curb-to-curb service for elderly and disabled)
- Worker/Driver (Commuter routes operating between various points in Kitsap County and either the Puget Sound Naval Shipyard in Bremerton or Naval Submarine Base Bangor. Drivers are full-time employees at the Navy installations who are also employed as part-time Kitsap Transit operators.)
- Vanpool
- TIP (Transit Incentive Program), a program for employees at federal work sites.
- SCOOT (Smart Commuter Option of Today), a carsharing program in the urbanized areas of Kitsap County.

Kitsap Transit participates in the ORCA card program and has a retail office at the Bremerton Transportation Center.

Kitsap Transit routes connect to Jefferson Transit, Mason Transit Authority, Pierce Transit and the Washington State Ferries terminals in Bremerton, Bainbridge, Kingston and Southworth.

=== Kitsap Foot Ferries ===
The foot ferry system comprises two routes that originate at the Bremerton Transportation Center and serve Port Orchard and Annapolis. The Bremerton–Port Orchard ferry operates as an all-day service on weekdays and weekends, while the Bremerton–Annapolis route runs only during peak periods on weekdays. The system has three assigned vessels that are rotated during annual windows for inspections and drydock maintenance. The Carlisle II has operated on the route since 1936 under various operators and was acquired by Kitsap Transit; it has a capacity of 143 passengers and serves as the primary Port Orchard boat. Admiral Pete was built in 1994 and can carry 120 passengers; it serves as the backup vessel to the Carlisle II and is used for the Bremerton–Annapolis route during peak periods. The agency's first hybrid diesel–electric ferry, MV Waterman, debuted in 2019 and can carry 150 passengers.

Service on the Bremerton–Annapolis route was temporarily suspended on October 22, 2026, after MV Waterman was removed from service due to mechanical issues. The vessel's 40 kWh battery had been damaged beyond repair and a backup vessel was unable to continue service to Annapolis. Kitsap Transit began to run additional trips to Port Orchard to compensate for the loss of Annapolis service.

== Administration ==
Kitsap Transit is overseen by a ten-member executive board composed of the three county commissioners, the mayor of Bremerton, a Bremerton City Council member, appointed representatives from the cities of Bainbridge Island, Bremerton, Port Orchard, and Poulsbo, an at-large member from the three smaller cities, and a non-voting member representing the agency's labor unions.

== Current fleet ==
=== Buses ===
As of 2024

Kitsap Transit bus fleet
Fleet number(s)	Image	Year	Manufacturer	Model	Seats	Notes
730–747		2003	Gillig	Phantom 40'	46	Does not include 738
752–761		2004	Gillig	Low Floor 35'	34	Does not include 757 and 759
762–766		2005	Gillig	Low Floor 35'	34	
771–774		2004	Gillig	Low Floor 40'	40	
775–779		2005	Gillig	Low Floor 40'	40	
780–787		2016	Gillig	Low Floor 30'	30	
788–789		2017	Gillig	Low Floor 30'	30	
792–795		2018	Gillig	Low Floor 29'	30	
800		2018	Proterra	Catalyst BE40	37	Battery electric bus
3500–3515		2019	Gillig	Low Floor 35'	34	
3516–3521		2022	Gillig	Low Floor Plus EV 35'	34	Battery electric bus
3522–3530		2024	Gillig	Low Floor Plus EV 35'	34	Battery electric bus
4000		2020	Gillig	Low Floor Plus EV 40'	40	Battery electric bus
4001–4005		2020	Gillig	Low Floor 40'	40	
4006–4010		2022	Gillig	Low Floor 40'	40	
6007–6045		1994–2002	MCI	102D3	47	Previously used coaches purchased for Worker/Driver routes.
6100–6104		2024	Gillig	Suburban 40'	37	Battery electric bus

=== Foot Ferries ===
Kitsap Foot Ferries fleet
Name	Year built	Capacity	Length	Top speed (knots)	Notes
Carlisle II	1917	140	60 ft (18 m)	10 kn (19 km/h; 12 mph)	Refurbished in 2021
Admiral Pete	1994	120	65 ft (20 m)	22 kn (41 km/h; 25 mph)	Refurbished in 2012
MV Waterman	2019	150	70 ft (21 m)	15 kn (28 km/h; 17 mph)	Hybrid diesel–electric
