= Beyond the Reef (film) =

1981 film by Frank C. Clarke

- Theatrical release poster
- Directed by: Frank C. Clarke
- Screenplay by: Louis LaRusso II; James Carabatsos
- Based on: Tikoyo and his Shark by Clement Richer
- Produced by: Raffaella De Laurentiis
- Starring: Dayton Ka'ne; Maren Jensen; Kathleen Swan; Keahi Farden; Oliverio Maciel Diaz; George Tapare; David Nakuna; Robert Atamu; Bob Spiegel
- Cinematography: Sam Martin
- Edited by: Ian Crafford
- Music by: Francis Lai
- Production company: Dino De Laurentiis Company
- Distributed by: Universal Pictures
- Release date: April 24, 1981
- Running time: 91 minutes
- Country: United States
- Language: English
- Box office: $547,525

Beyond the Reef is a 1981 American adventure film directed by Frank C. Clarke and written by Louis LaRusso II and James Carabatsos. The film stars Dayton Ka'ne, Maren Jensen, Kathleen Swan, Keahi Farden, Oliverio Maciel Diaz, George Tapare, David Nakuna, Robert Atamu and Bob Spiegel.

== Cast ==
- Dayton Ka'ne as Tikoyo
- Maren Jensen as Diana
- Kathleen Swan as Milly
- Keahi Farden as Jeff
- Oliverio Maciel Diaz as Manidu
- George Tapare as The Hawaiian
- David Nakuna as Mischima
- Robert Atamu as Maku
- Bob Spiegel as Turpin
- Maui Temaui as Milly's Boyfriend
- Teriitehu Star as Grandfather
- Joseph Ka'ne as Tikoyo as a child
- Titaua Castel as Diana as a child
- Andre Garnier as Jeff as a child
