= South Kitsap Regional Park =

Public park in Washington, United States

- Interactive map of South Kitsap Regional Park
- Location: Port Orchard, Kitsap County, Washington, U.S.
- Nearest city: Port Orchard, Washington
- Coordinates: 47°31′31″N 122°36′55″W
- Area: 209 acres (85 ha)
- Established: 2008
- Operator: Kitsap County

South Kitsap Regional Park is a 209-acre public regional park located in Port Orchard, Washington. It is operated by Kitsap County Parks and offers athletic fields, forested hiking trails, a skatepark, a children’s nature trail, a playground, picnic areas, and a 7.5-inch-gauge miniature railroad operated by Kitsap Live Steamers.

== Amenities ==
The park includes a wide range of recreational facilities:

- Three athletic fields – one multipurpose field and two baseball/softball/soccer fields
- Skatepark and BMX/dirt-track area – a 7,000-square-foot raised-bowl skatepark and "urban plaza" designed by New Line Skateparks
- Playground and Forest Explorer Trail – a 0.3-mile interactive nature trail for children
- Trail network – forested walking, hiking, and biking trails behind the athletic fields
- Picnic shelter – capacity for 48 people, reservable seasonally
- Batting cages – operated by a private concessionaire
- Miniature railroad – maintained and operated by Kitsap Live Steamers (KLS)

The park has two primary access points:

- SE Lund Avenue – skatepark, athletic fields, batting cages
- SE Marbeth Lane / Jackson Ave SE – playground, picnic shelter, miniature railroad

Restrooms near the skatepark are open year-round; the playground restrooms operate April–September.

== History ==
In 2007, ownership of South Kitsap Regional Park was transferred from the South Kitsap Parks and Recreation District to Kitsap County after years of limited funding and deteriorating facilities made continued district management unsustainable. County officials viewed the takeover as the only viable way to preserve and improve the park, and the agreement included a commitment for the county to invest more than $2 million in upgrades. The change also aligned the park with the county’s broader recreation and open-space planning goals, leading to the adoption of a new master plan in 2008 and the development of modern amenities and conservation projects in the years that followed.

=== Development and planning ===
Planning for redevelopment began in 2007–2008, with design contributions from BCRA, Valerian Landscape Architects, Norton-Arnold, Anchor Environmental, and New Line Skateparks.

The park was selected as a pilot project for the Sustainable Sites Initiative (SITES), focusing on:

- preserving canopy and forest habitat
- minimizing soil disturbance
- concentrating development in previously disturbed areas

Approximately two-thirds of the park remains preserved forestland. The redevelopment planning phase was subsidized on Monday, November 24, 2008.

=== Incidents ===
On September 12, 2025, a brush fire burned approximately half an acre in a forested portion of South Kitsap Regional Park (near the Jackson-area forest). The fire was contained by emergency crews from South Kitsap Fire and Rescue (SKFR), and no injuries were reported. While the remainder of the park remained open, the northwest side was closed temporarily to allow crews to extinguish hot spots and monitor the area for safety. The county’s fire-marshal office announced that they will investigate the fire’s cause.

== Kitsap Live Steamers ==
Kitsap Live Steamers is a non‑profit group of railroad enthusiasts that build and operate a scaled railroad track at South Kitsap Regional Park. (Note: The nonprofit also offers educational programs for local schools and youth groups on railroad operations and safety.) Rides are “by donation,” wheelchair‑accessible, on 2nd and 4th Saturdays, and traverse about 4,000 feet of track including a bridge and a trestle. According to the nonprofit Kitsap Live Steamers (KLS), the group began constructing its 7.5-inch gauge railroad shortly after the land became available for recreational development.

As of 2025, the group offers public rides from April to October, typically on the 2nd and 4th Saturdays each month.

== Public use and events ==
South Kitsap Regional Park is one of the primary recreation sites in southern Kitsap County, serving athletes, hikers, cyclists, skaters, families, and visitors. The diversity of facilities and large wooded areas make it popular for daily recreation, community gatherings, nature walks, and children’s play. In October, the Kitsap Live Steamers celebrate the month with a ride called the ghost train.

== See also ==
- Port Orchard, Washington
- Kitsap County, Washington
