= Philip Brown (actor) =

American actor

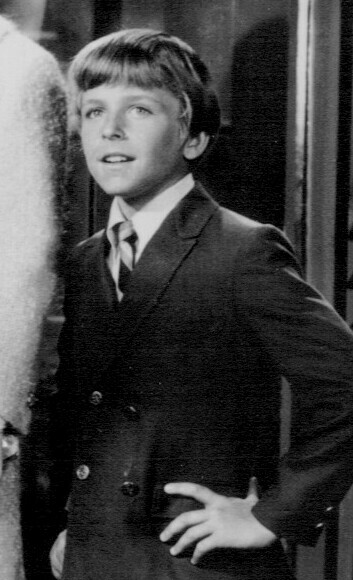
- From the first season of The Doris Day Show (1968)
- Born: Philip J. Brown Jr. Coalinga, California, U.S.
- Occupation: Actor
- Years active: 1963–present

Philip J. Brown Jr. is an American actor best known for his television performances.

== Biography ==
Brown is a native of Coalinga, California. His father Philip Brown Sr. was a television technician after having been an actor, and his uncle was actor Peter Brown. He graduated from North Hollywood High School.

He first played Billy Martin, the son of Doris Day on The Doris Day Show, from 1968 to 1971.

Brown portrayed Randy Harford in When the Whistle Blows (1980). He also appeared in the 1980s Dynasty spin-off series The Colbys as Neil Kittredge, in Knots Landing as Brian Johnston in 1991, and in 1993 as Buck Huston in Loving and in its spinoff series The City. Brown also played Steve Kendall, a sportscaster, on Search for Tomorrow. He also made films in South Africa in the 1980s.

== Partial filmography ==
- The Playground (1965) - Fishback
- Pretty Maids All in a Row (1971) - Jim Green
- Rivals (1981) - Clyde 'Clutch' Turner
- Dune Surfer (1988) - Ben Maartens
- Back to Freedom (1988) - Dr. Paul Fleming
- Wild Zone (1989) - Wayne Garrison
- The Nostradamus Kid (1993) - Fuzzy Wuzzy
- An American Reunion (2003) - Rob Stefanic
