= William Francis Petrovic =

American Navy admiral (1913–1991)

William F. Petrovic
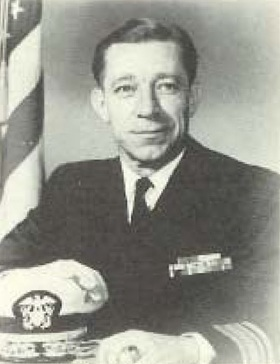
- Born: January 12, 1913; Cleveland, Ohio, US
- Died: June 25, 1991 (aged 78); Bremerton, Washington, US
- Military career
- Allegiance: United States
- Branch: United States Navy
- Service years: 1935–1972
- Rank: Rear Admiral
- Commands: Puget Sound Naval Shipyard; New York Naval Shipyard
- Conflicts: World War II
- Awards: Legion of Merit; Bronze Star Medal

Rear Admiral William Francis Petrovic (January 12, 1913 – June 25, 1991) was a preeminent naval engineer and ship builder in the United States Navy, serving from 1935 to 1972.

== Early years ==
Born in Cleveland, Ohio, to Slovenian immigrants, Frank and Anna (Geuheli) Petrovic, he was orphaned at the age of six and later raised by his older siblings. Following high school, he was appointed to the United States Naval Academy, graduating in 1935, with a Bachelor of Science degree.

== Naval service ==
Following graduation, he served two years aboard the USS Oklahoma (BB-37) and then attended graduate school at the Naval Postgraduate School and at the Massachusetts Institute of Technology, where he earned a Master of Science degree in naval architecture and marine engineering. In 1941, Petrovic was designated an engineering duty officer (EDO) and ordered to Puget Sound Naval Shipyard (PSNS).

Petrovic was serving as the ship superintendent for the overhaul of the USS Colorado (BB-45) when the war broke out in December, 1941. As the only battleship-capable shipyard on the West Coast, PSNS began to receive battle-damaged ships from Pearl Harbor in late December. The first to arrive was USS Tennessee (BB-43), followed the next day by USS Maryland (BB-46). The more heavily damaged battleships—Nevada, California and West Virginia—did not arrive until later in 1942–43. During much of the time Petrovic was stationed at PSNS—February 1941–October 1944—he was in charge of all aircraft carrier and battleship work. He arrived as a lieutenant junior grade and left as a full commander. In November 1944, Petrovic was ordered to the Pacific Theater first as fleet maintenance officer (carriers) on the staff of Commander Service Force Pacific (ComServPac) and then from January to June 1945 was material officer on the staff of Commander Task Force Fifty-One aboard USS Piedmont (AD-17). While in this position he took part in the invasions of Iwo Jima and Okinawa and was awarded the Bronze Star Medal for "heroic service" supervising and directing the salvage and repair of ships and craft damaged by enemy action. At the time of the Japanese surrender in September 1945, he was serving as the staff maintenance officer to Commander Service Squadron TEN, a position he held until April 1947.

Upon returning to the US, Petrovic began rotating duty between the Bureau of Ships (BUSHIPS) in Washington, D.C., and the Navy's shipyards and repair facilities. At the Bureau of Ships he ran the Battleship and Heavy/Light Cruiser Type Desk (1947–49) and was the director, Naval Facilities and later Management Control Divisions (1952–55). At Shipyards, he served as repair superintendent and then new construction superintendent at Mare Island Naval Shipyard (1949–52) during the building of the Navy's first "Hunter Killer" submarines, USS Bass (SSK-2) and USS Bonita (SSK-3) and the conversion of a diesel "Fleet Boat" to a guided missile submarine USS Tunny (SSG-282). As production officer at San Francisco Naval Shipyard (1955–58), he was responsible for the modernization (SCB-125) of World War II carriers USS Wasp (CV-18), USS Hancock (CV-19), USS Bon Homme Richard (CV-31) and USS Oriskany (CV-34) and new construction of a guided missile destroyer, USS Mahan (DDG-42). At New York Naval Shipyard (1958–59), he oversaw the construction of two carriers, USS Independence (CV-62) and USS Constellation (CV-64). In 1959, Petrovic was ordered to San Diego as the commanding officer, Naval Repair Facility, where he was responsible for repair and minor modification to southern California-based ships.

Upon selection as flag officer in 1962, Admiral Petrovic reported to Washington, D.C., as the assistant chief BUSHIPS Plans and Administration and inspector general with additional duties as assistant chief BUSHIPS for field activities. In January 1966 he assumed command of the New York Naval Shipyard, which he was tasked with closing. In July he became deputy commander of shipyard programs and director for shipyard modernization under the new Naval Sea Systems Command.

In 1967, Admiral Petrovic took command of Puget Sound Naval Shipyard. During his five-year tenure, he was credited with the yard's final transition to a "nuclear"-capable overhaul facility for both submarines and surface ships as well as becoming the Navy's premiere shipyard for carrier overhaul. Additionally, the shipyard carried on its tradition of new construction, building USS Seattle (AOE-3), USS Detroit (AOE-4) and USS Puget Sound (AD-38). These were the last Navy ships built in a public shipyard. Admiral Petrovic retired in 1972 after 37 years of distinguished naval service and at that time was the senior engineering duty officer in the United States Navy.

== Retirement ==
Following retirement, Admiral Petrovic traveled extensively and worked shortly as a consultant in the shipbuilding industry. He continued to be very active in civic organizations, including the Bremerton Chamber of Commerce, Rotary, the Community Theater, the Navy League, Retired Officer's Association and was president of the community United Way Campaign in 1978.

Rear Admiral Petrovic died in 1991 in Bremerton, Washington, where he is buried at the Miller-Woodlawn Memorial Park next to his wife of 52 years, Gertrude (Kirk). The Petrovics had four children; William Kirk, James Richard, Deborah Lynn and Bruce Douglas.

== Legacy ==
Kitsap Transit operates the ferry MV Admiral Pete, which was named in honor of Rear Admiral Petrovic.

== Decorations and awards ==
1. Legion of Merit
2. Bronze Star Medal with Combat "V"
3. American Defense Service Medal
4. American Campaign Medal
5. Asiatic-Pacific Campaign Medal with two service stars (Iwo Jima and Okinawa)
6. World War II Victory Medal
7. Navy Occupation Service Medal Asian Clasp (Japan)
8. National Defense Service Medal (two awards)
