= Miss Washington Teen USA =

Beauty pageant competition

- Formation: 1983
- Type: Beauty pageant
- Headquarters: Puyallup
- Location: Washington
- Members: Miss Teen USA
- Official language: English
- Key people: Maureen Francisco
- Website: Official website

The Miss Washington Teen USA competition is the pageant that selects the representative for the state of Washington in the Miss Teen USA pageant.

Bella Seeden of Temecula, CA was appointed Miss Washington Teen USA on July 30th, 2026 after the open casting call from Thomas Brodeur, the new owner of the national pageant. She will represent Washington at Miss Teen USA 2026.

== Results summary ==
=== Placements ===
- 2nd runner-up: Dru Homer (1985)
- Top 10: Rhonda Monroe (1983), Amy Travis (1989), Megan Munroe (2000), Shannon Hulbert (2001), Jasmine Jorgensen (2003)
- Top 15: Sadie Porter (2009), Camilla Cyr (2010)
- Top 20: Mackenzie Kuiken (2023)

Washington holds a record of 9 placements at Miss Teen USA.

=== Awards ===
- Miss Congeniality: Marianne Bautista (2020)
- Miss Photogenic: Anjelie Eldredge (1994)
- Best State Costume: Novalee Lewis (2021; 3rd place)

== Winners ==
- Declared as Winner
- Ended as runner-up
- Ended as one of the finalists or semifinalists

Year	Name	Hometown	Age^{1}	Local title	Placement at Miss Teen USA	Special awards at Miss Teen USA	Notes
2026	Bella Seeden	Temecula, CA	19	Miss Temecula Teen			1st runner-up to Miss California Teen USA 2026
2025	Maliyah Van Hook	Gilroy, CA	18				
2024	Kendall Beasley	Kennewick	17	Miss Tri Cities Teen			
2023	Mackenzie Kuiken	South Bend	16	Miss South Bend Teen	Top 20		
2022	Kate Dixon	Sammamish	17				
2021	Novalee Lewis	Tacoma	16			Best State Costume – 3rd Place	Previously Miss Junior High School America 2016; Previously Miss Washington's Outstanding Teen 2018; Previously Miss Rhode Island High School 2020
2020	Marianne Bautista	Renton	17			Miss Congeniality	
2019	Lily Lloyd	Orting	17				
2018	Summer Keffeler	Monroe	16				Sister of Stormy Keffeler, original titleholder of Miss Washington USA 2016; Later Miss Washington Collegiate America 2020; Miss Nevada USA 2022
2017	Alyssa Williams	Sumner	16				
2016	Claire Wright	Sammamish	18			Voted Best Laugh at Miss Teen USA	Miss Washington Junior Teen 2013; National American Miss Jr. Teen 2013 (Top 10)
2015	Priya Gopal-Walker	Seattle	17				
2014	Starla Sampaco	Bellevue	18				
2013	Imani Blackmon	Tacoma	17				First African-American Miss Washington Teen USA: Later Miss Washington USA 2020. Miss Congeniality at Miss USA 2020
2012	Alex Carlson-Helo	Everett	17				Later Miss Washington USA 2017
2011	Cheyenne Van Tine	Kennewick	17				1st runner up in the Miss Washington's Outstanding Teen 2009 & 2010 pageants.
2010	Camilla Cyr	Kirkland	17		Top 15		
2009	Sadie Porter	Selah	17		Top 15		Previously Miss Washington's Outstanding Teen 2004
2008	Mandy Schendel	Newcastle	17				Later Miss Washington 2012
2007	Shalane Larango	Ridgefield	18				Previously Miss Washington's Outstanding Teen 2005 (second runner up at Miss America's Outstanding Teen 2006 pageant). First Miss America's Outstanding Teen state titleholder to compete at Miss Teen USA.
2006	Kendra Timm	Arlington	18				
2005	Kaylee Moore	Gig Harbor	17				
2004	Danielle Jensen	Lynnwood	17				
2003	Jasmine Jorgensen	Spanaway	17		Top 10		
2002	Maichal McJunkin	Seattle	15				
2001	Shannon Hulbert	Lake Stevens	17		Top 10		
2000	Megan Munroe	Monroe	16		Top 10		
1999	Dianna Carlson	Federal Way	16				
1998	Amber Lancaster	Tacoma	18				Now a model on The Price Is Right
1997	Emma DeSilets	Seattle	15				Contestant at National Sweetheart 2002
1996	Emily Ballard	Seattle	19				
1995	Summer Springer	Bellevue	17				
1994	Anjelie Eldredge	Vancouver	18			Miss Photogenic	
1993	Rebecca Vaughn	Seattle	17				
1992	Kaley O'Kelley	East Wenatchee	17				Co-host of KTVK's flagship show Good Morning Arizona
1991	Elizabeth Lee	Seattle	17				
1990	Paige Anderson	Seattle	19				
1989	Amy Travis	Wenatchee	18		Top 10		
1988	Karen Petre	Bellevue	18				
1987	Johna Sainsbury	Zillah	16				
1986	Lisa M. Elliott	Snohomish	17				
1985	Dru Homer	Selah	17		2nd runner-up		
1984	Charlene Walters	Lynnwood	16				
1983	Rhonda Monroe	Lynnwood	17		Top 10		

^{1} Age at the time of the Miss Teen USA pageant
