= Susan Buckner =

American actress, dancer and beauty pageant winner (1952–2024)

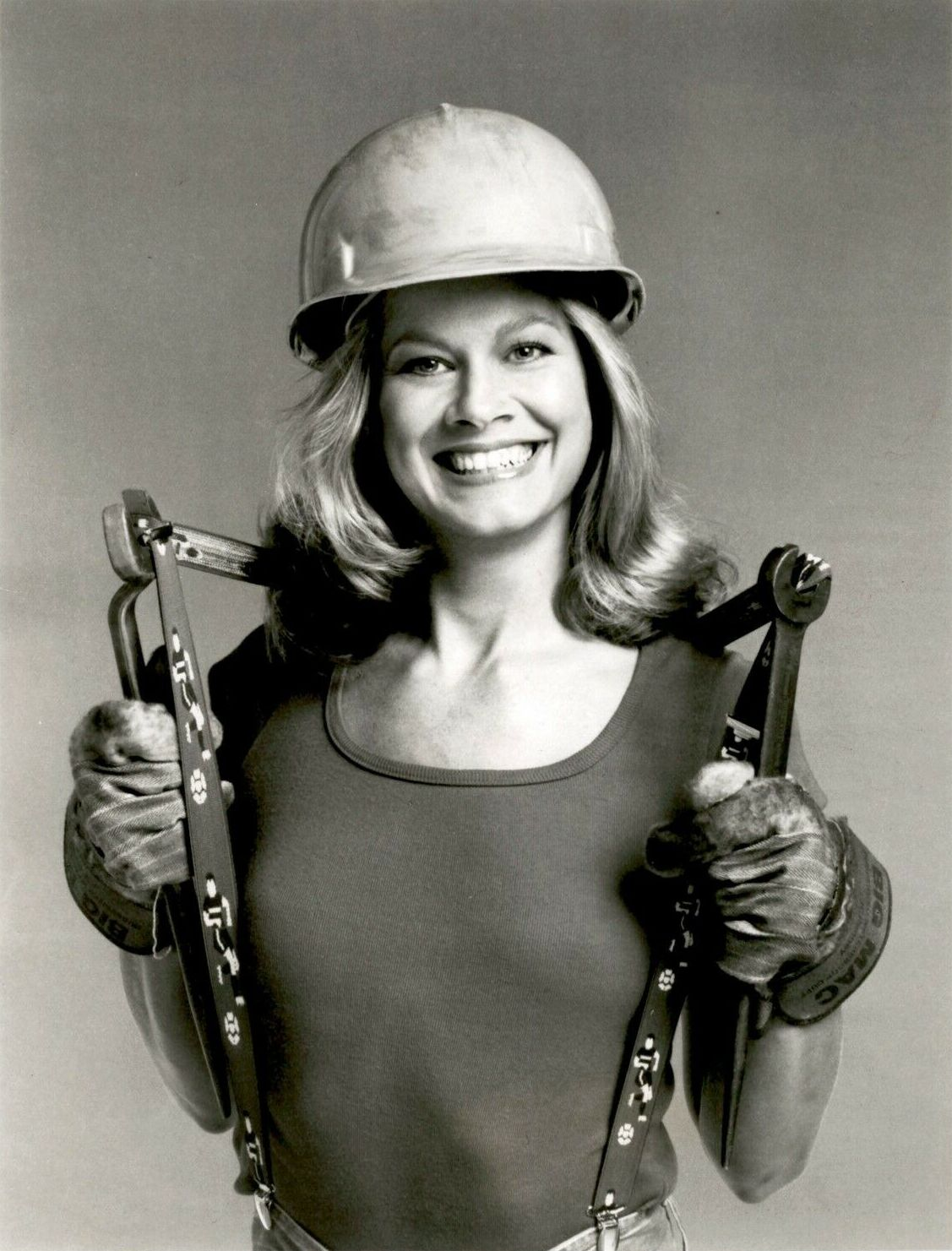
- Buckner in the 1980 television series When the Whistle Blows
- Born: January 28, 1952; Seattle, Washington, U.S.
- Died: May 2, 2024 (aged 72); Miami, Florida, U.S.
- Occupations: Actress; dancer; beauty pageant winner
- Years active: 1973–1981
- Known for: Grease; Deadly Blessing; The Brady Bunch Hour; When the Whistle Blows
- Title: Miss Washington 1971
- Spouse: Michael R. Josephs (m. 1979; div. 1997)
- Children: 2

Susan Buckner (January 28, 1952 – May 2, 2024) was an American actress, dancer and beauty pageant winner.

== Life and career ==
Susan Buckner was born in Seattle, on January 28, 1952. Prior to her acting career she was crowned Miss Washington in 1971 and in September went on to become a top ten finalist in the Miss America 1972 pageant (she tied for first in the swimsuit preliminary), which was eventually won by Miss Ohio Laurel Lea Schaefer. Nevertheless, her role in the Miss America pageant would be parlayed into a career in the entertainment industry. Her acting career is sprinkled with supporting roles in television, stage, and film.

Buckner portrayed high school cheerleader Patty Simcox in the 1978 summer blockbuster Grease, starring Olivia Newton-John and John Travolta. She was one of The Golddiggers, an all-female singing and dancing group featured on The Dean Martin Show. She made appearances on The Mac Davis Show and Sonny & Cher. She also appeared as one of The Krofftettes who performed synchronised swimming routines on The Brady Bunch Hour.

Buckner's career in show business would end after she decided to instead focus more on raising her two children.

== Personal life and death ==
From 1979 to 1997, Buckner was married to Michael R. Josephs, with whom she had two children.

Buckner died in Miami, Florida, on May 2, 2024, at the age of 72.

== Filmography ==
=== Film ===
Year	Title	Role	Notes
1976	The First Nudie Musical	Dancer	
1978	Grease	Patricia "Patty" Simcox	
1981	Deadly Blessing	Vicky Anderson	

=== Television ===
Year	Title	Role	Notes
1973	The Dean Martin Show	Golddigger	1 episode: "Celebrity Roast: Bette Davis"
1976	Police Woman	Judy	1 episode: "Angela"
1976–77	The Brady Bunch Hour	Krofftette	9 episodes
1977	Switch	Jessica	1 episode: "Eden's Gate"
1977	The Amazing Howard Hughes	Jean Harlow	TV movie
1977–78	The Hardy Boys/Nancy Drew Mysteries	George Fayne	3 episodes: "Nancy Drew's Love Match", "Will the Real Santa Claus...?", "Mystery on the Avalanche Express"
1978	Starsky & Hutch	Sharon Carstairs	1 episode: "The Heavyweight"
1978	Return Engagement	Janice	TV movie
1979	B.J. and the Bear	Renee	1 episode: "Odyssey of the Shady Truth"
1979	The Love Boat	Kim Patterson	1 episode: "The Spider Serenade/Next Door Wife/The Harder They Fall"
1980	When the Whistle Blows	Lucy Davis	9 episodes
