= Carlisle II =

Puget Sound Mosquito Fleet vessel

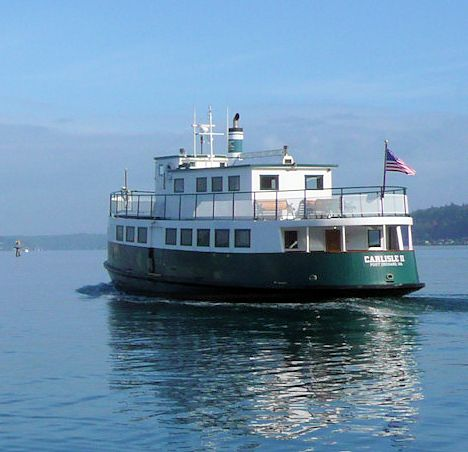
- Carlisle II departing Port Orchard, Washington, October 2010

History

United States
- Name: Carlisle II
- Owner: Kitsap Transit
- Operator: Kitsap Harbor Tours
- Route: Bremerton–Port Orchard, Washington
- Builder: O. I. Thorsen
- Launched: April 9, 1917
- Identification: Official Number: 214872; Callsign: WDB7545
- Status: Museum ship

General characteristics
- Tonnage: 95 Gross, 86 Net
- Length: 65 ft (20 m) on deck
- Beam: 20 feet (6.1 m)
- Depth: 5.7 feet (1.7 m)
- Installed power: 300 hp (220 kW) John Deere
- Propulsion: Propeller
- Capacity: 143 Persons
- Notes: Wood Hull
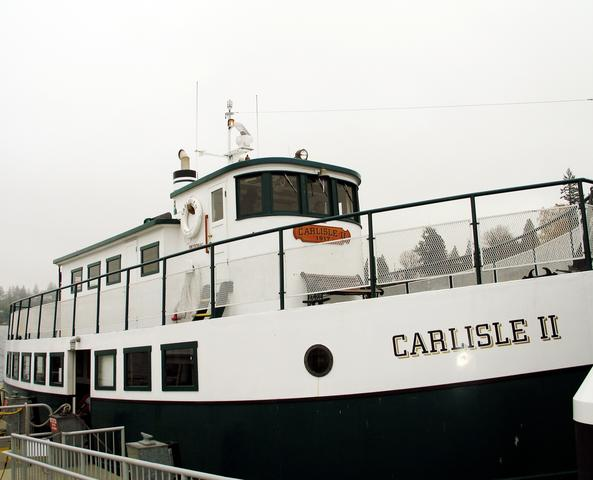
- Carlisle II dockside

Carlisle II is a ferry operating on Puget Sound in the U.S. state of Washington. Carlisle II was built in 1917 as part of the Puget Sound mosquito fleet, a loosely organized fleet of privately owned ferries that operated in the late 19th and early 20th centuries. Since 1936, she has operated as a passenger-only ferry on the Bremerton–Port Orchard route.

Carlisle II is one of two former Mosquito Fleet vessels in operation, along with the Virginia V. In her current role, Carlisle II serves as the backup vessel for the Bremerton–Port Orchard route's current operator, Kitsap Transit. The main vessel on the route is the MV Waterman, which entered service in 2019.

== History ==
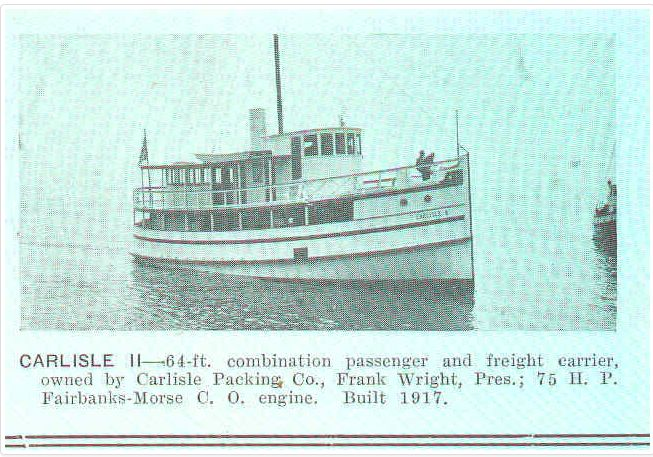
Carlisle II entry from Pacific Fisherman Yearbook 1919

Carlisle II was built in Bellingham in 1917 by Lummi Island Navigation Company, and first carried freight and passengers between Bellingham and the Carlisle Packing Company's salmon cannery on Lummi Island. Original power was from a Fairbanks-Morse Type "C-O" Heavy Duty Marine Oil Engine. It was a three-cylinder hot bulb (or "semi-diesel") engine rated 75 horsepower at 340 RPM.

In 1923 she was rebuilt as a car ferry and ran from Gooseberry Point to Lummi and Orcas islands.

Horluck Transportation Co., under Captain Willis Nearhoff, purchased Carlisle II in 1936 and converted her back to passenger vessel use for the short run between Bremerton and Port Orchard across Sinclair Inlet. The service was heavily used during the war years by personnel commuting to and from the Puget Sound Naval Shipyard in Bremerton. Eventually Mr. Nearhoff's daughter, Mary Lieske, became manager and then owner of the company. She was also reportedly the first woman ferry captain.

Seattle businessman Hilton Smith bought out Horluck in 1995 and invested almost $300,000 in repairs and upgrades to Carlisle II. In 2008, Kitsap Transit purchased Carlisle II from Smith and continues to use her as needed on the Bremerton-Port Orchard run. The vessel underwent a major, two-year renovation that cost $1.3 million and was completed in 2021. The renovation included replacing the engine, generator, ventilation, and propeller, along with repainting of the exterior and seating areas.

== Current status ==
Signboard mounted inside Carlisle II designating her a "Floating Museum"

Carlisle II remains in operation, acting as a backup vessel for service between Bremerton and Port Orchard, Washington. The MV Waterman, a hybrid diesel-electric ferry, is the primary vessel for the service.

Carlisle II has been designated a "Floating Museum" by the Washington Commission for the Humanities, and her interior is decorated with numerous photos and information about her and other Mosquito Fleet vessels.

== Books ==
- Kitsap County Historical Society, Port Orchard (Images of America), Arcadia Publishing, 2012, page 112, ISBN 0738589225
- Follansbee, Joe, The Fyddeye Guide to America's Maritime History, Fyddeye (Publisher), 2010, page 68, ISBN 0615381537
- Neal, Carolyn, and Janus, Thomas Kilday, Puget Sound Ferries, American Historical Press, 2001, pages 59, 80 ISBN 1-892724-19-7

== See also ==
- Puget Sound Mosquito Fleet
