= Lizzi Jackson =

American beauty pageant titleholder

- Born: Elisabeth Gabrielle Jackson; September 20, 1991 (age 35)
- Education: Western Washington University
- Beauty pageant titleholder
- Title: Miss Whatcom County 2014; Miss Rainier 2015; Miss Washington 2015
- Major competition: Miss America 2016

Elisabeth Gabrielle Jackson (born September 20, 1991) is an American beauty pageant titleholder from Bellingham, Washington, who was crowned Miss Washington 2015. She competed for the Miss America 2016 title in September 2015.

== Pageant career ==
=== Early pageants ===
In 2006, Jackson contended for the Miss Washington Junior Teen in the National American Miss pageant system, placing third runner-up in the spokesmodel category. Shifting to the Miss USA pageant system, Jackson won the Thurston County Teen USA title in 2007 and again in 2009 and tried twice, unsuccessfully, for the Miss Washington Teen USA crown.

Entering the Miss America system as an adult, Jackson won the Miss Whatcom County 2014 title on March 8, 2014. This was her third attempt at the local title. She competed in the 2014 Miss Washington pageant with the platform "Compass to Campus: Investing in Our Future" and performed a medley of movie themes on clarinet in the talent portion of the competition. She was not a Top-5 finalist for the state title.

=== Miss Washington 2015 ===
In March 2015, Jackson was crowned Miss Rainier 2015. She entered the Miss Washington pageant in Burien, Washington, at the Highline Performing Arts Center in July 2015 as one of 21 qualifiers for the state title. Jackson's competition talent was a jazz vocal performance. Her platform is "Community Through Mentorship: Investing in Our Future".

Jackson won the competition on Saturday, July 4, 2015, when she received her crown from outgoing Miss Washington titleholder Kailee Dunn. She earned more than $10,000 in scholarship money and other prizes from the state pageant. As Miss Washington, her activities include public appearances across the state of Washington.

=== Vying for Miss America 2016 ===
Jackson was Washington's representative at the Miss America 2016 pageant in Atlantic City, New Jersey, in September 2015. In the televised finale on September 13, 2015, she placed outside the Top 15 semi-finalists and was eliminated from competition. She was one of the 5 contestants awarded the $5000 STEM scholarship. She also was awarded a $3,000 scholarship prize as her state's representative.

== Early life and education ==
Jackson is a graduate of River Ridge High School in Lacey, Washington. Her father is Troy Jackson and her mother is Dee Jackson.

Jackson is a June 2014 graduate of Western Washington University where she earned a Bachelor of Arts degree in marketing and management information systems. In August 2014, Jackson became a market analyst for Haggen Food & Pharmacy, an independent grocery retailer in the Pacific Northwest.

Awards and achievements
Preceded by Kailee Dunn	Miss Washington; 2015	Succeeded by Alicia Nicole Cooper
