= Miss Washington's Teen =

- Formation: 2004
- Type: Scholarship pageant
- Location: Olympia, Washington
- Members: Miss America's Teen
- Official language: English
- Miss Washington's Teen Executive Director: Krystle Ramos
- Key people: Morgan Greco; Payton May; Nicole Renard
- Website: Official website

The Miss Washington's Teen competition is the pageant that selects the representative for the U.S. state of Washington in the Miss America's Teen pageant. The competition is held each June in Olympia, Washington and consists of five categories; private interview, health and fitness, talent, evening gown and on stage conversation.

Paiton Leibold of Kingston was named Miss Washington's Teen on July 1, 2026, at the Capital High School Performing Arts Center in Olympia. She competed for the title of Miss America's Teen 2027 on September 5, 2026, at the Kravis Center for the Performing Arts in West Palm Beach, Florida.

In February 2023, the Miss America Organization renamed the Teen program, dropping "Outstanding" from the title of all local, state and the national program name. Morgan Greco was renamed "Miss America's Teen 2023".

== Results summary ==
Since the program's institution in 2004, dozens of local programs have helped mentor the young women who ultimately compete on the state and national stage. Payton May and Morgan Greco, Miss America's Outstanding Teen 2020/21 and 2023 respectively, are the only national Miss America titleholders from the Miss Washington Scholarship Organization.

== Local Programs ==
The teen program in Washington State is composed of candidates from local competitions as well as open titleholders. The local programs for Miss Washington's Outstanding Teen are as follows:

- Auburn; Top 5 (2014, 2019, 2023), Semi Finalist (2013, 2015, 2016, 2017, 2018, 2022, 2023), Preliminary Talent (2023, 2024) Special Awards (2018, 2022, 2023, 2025)
- Clark County/Greater Vancouver; Winner (2005, 2007), Top 5 (2011, 2017, 2021, 2022, 2024), Semi Finalist (2016, 2018, 2019, 2021, 2023) Preliminary Talent (2021), Preliminary Fitness (2022), Special Awards (2021, 2022)
- Grays Harbor (Pacific Coast added in 2024); Top 5 (2009, 2012, 2021, 2025), Semi Finalist (2014, 2022), Preliminary Talent (2025), Preliminary Fitness (2022), Special Awards (2018)
- Lewis County; new for 2024
- Pierce County; Winner (2008), Top 5 (2011, 2013, 2017, 2018), Semi Finalist (2009, 2012, 2016, 2021, 2022), Preliminary Fitness (2022), Special Awards (2010, 2014, 2015, 2016, 2024, 2025)
- Seattle/Emerald City; Winner (2018, 2023), Top 5 (2017, 2018, 2019, 2022, 2023, 2024, 2025), Top 10 (2014, 2015, 2016, 2019, 2021, 2025), Preliminary Evening Gown (2023, 2025), Special Awards (2018, 2019)
- Spokane; Winner (2017), Top 5 (2015, 2023) Semi Finalist (2012, 2018, 2025), Special Awards (2012, 2017)
- Thurston County; new for 2023, Winner (2024), Top 5 (2023), Top 12 (2025), Special Awards (2025)
- Tri Cities; Winner (2011, 2012), Top 5 (2009, 2013, 2014, 2015, 2025), Semi Finalist (2010, 2018, 2022, 2023, 2024), Preliminary Talent (2011, 2012, 2014, 2015), Preliminary Fitness (2014, 2015), Special Award (2011, 2012, 2017, 2022)
- West Sound / Evergreen; Top 5 (2018, 2019), Semi Finalists (2012, 2016, 2021, 2023, 2024), Special Awards (2010, 2011, 2012, 2013, 2015)
- Yakima County/Apple Valley/Sun Valley; Winner (2014), Top 5 (2008, 2016, 2024), Semi Finalists (2010, 2012, 2014, 2015, 2021), Special Awards (2009, 2010, 2012, 2015, 2016, 2018, 2019, 2021)

== Results summary ==
=== National Placements ===
- Miss America's Outstanding Teen: Payton May (2020), Morgan Greco (2023)
- 2nd runners-up: Shalane Larango (2006)
- 3rd runners-up: Victoria Renard (2011)
- Top 12: Janae Calaway (2013)

=== Awards ===
==== Preliminary awards ====
- Preliminary Evening Wear/On Stage Question: Tayler Plunkett (2015), Payton May (2020)
- Preliminary Talent: Nicole Renard (2012), Morgan Greco (2023)

==== Other awards ====
- Miss Congeniality/Spirit of America: Tia Moua (2018)
- America's Choice: Janae Calaway (2013)
- Advertising Award: Janae Calaway (2013)
- Non-finalist Evening Wear: Tayler Plunkett (2015)
- Non-finalist Talent: Nicole Renard (2012)
- Top Vocal Talent: Morgan Greco (2023)

==== Featured competitors ====
Many candidates from the Miss Washington's Teen program have gone on to win titles within MAO and other distinguished pageant programs.

- Sami Schubert, Miss Washington Volunteer 2023, competed in the Miss Washington's Teen program from 2013 to 2016.
- Ripley Ramos, Miss Washington Teen Volunteer 2023, competed in the Miss Washington's Teen program in 2019 and 2020-21 (Top 10). She is the daughter of the current Miss Washington's Teen Director Krystle Ramos.
- Prior to winning the Miss Washington 2022 title, Regan Gallo competed at Miss Washington's Teen 2016, placing in the Top 10.
- Reagan Rebstock was crowned the inaugural Miss Washington Volunteer 2022. She previously competed for Miss Washington's Teen in 2014 (4th Runner Up) and 2016 (1st Runner Up).
- Novalee Lewis won the Miss Washington Teen USA 2021 title. She was crowned Miss Washington's Teen 2018, and was previously Miss Junior High School America 2016.
- Nicole Renard, the 2011 Miss Washington's Teen titleholder, competed at Miss California 2016 (Top 15) before becoming Miss Washington 2017. Renard has also competed in the National American Miss program.
- Alicia Cooper, Miss Washington 2016, was first runner up to the teen title in 2011.
- Reina Almon was crowned Miss Washington 2013. She placed first runner up in 2012, in addition to holding the 2009 teen title.
- Kenzi Novell competed in the Miss Washington's Teen program in 2009 before becoming Miss Washington USA 2015.

== Winners ==
- Declared as winner
- Ended as a runner-up
- Ended as a finalist or semi-finalist

Year	Name	Hometown	Age	Local Title	Talent	Placement at MAO Teen	Special scholarships at MAO Teen	Notes
2026	Paiton Leibold	Kingston	17	Miss Emerald City's Teen	American Sign Language			
2025	Kendall Runyan	Silverdale	17	Miss Liberty's Teen	Vocal			
2024	Emma Adams	Olympia	17	Miss Thurston County's Teen				
2023	Emily Hamilton	Snoqualmie	17	Miss Seattle's Teen				
2022	Madison Zantello	Bonney Lake	18	Miss South Sound's Outstanding Teen (open)	Operatic Vocal	N/A		Took over title when Greco won national title. 2nd Runner Up and Preliminary Talent winner at Miss Washington's Outstanding Teen 2022 Competition. Top 10 at Miss Washington's Outstanding Teen 2021. Later Top 12 and Preliminary Talent Winner at Miss Washington 2024
2022	Morgan Greco	Camas	16	Miss Camas' Outstanding Teen (open)	Operatic Vocal, "The Jewel Song"	Winner	Preliminary Talent Top Vocalist Award	Later crowned Miss Teen International USA 2024; Previously First Runner Up, Preliminary Talent and Fitness winner at Miss Washington's Outstanding Teen 2021
2021	Chloe Furnstahl	Lake Tapps	17	Miss Rainier's Outstanding Teen (open)	Jazz Dance			Previously First Runner Up, Preliminary Talent and Preliminary Fitness Winner at Miss Washington's Outstanding Teen 2019 Second Runner Up at Miss Washington's Outstanding Teen 2018
2020	Tiffany Abrams	Spokane Valley	18	Miss Spokane Valley's Outstanding Teen 2019 (open)	Vocal	National Pageant Cancelled due to COVID-19 pandemic		3rd Runner-Up at Miss Washington's Outstanding Teen 2019 Pageant. Appointed Miss Washington's Outstanding Teen 2020 on June 1, 2020. Previously Top 10 at Miss Washington's Outstanding Teen 2017 and 2018. 4th runner-up and Preliminary Evening Gown Winner at Miss Washington 2022
2019	Emilie Scott	Bremerton	17	Miss West Sound's Outstanding Teen	Ballet en Pointe	N/A		2nd Runner Up at Miss Washington's Outstanding Teen 2019 competition. Took over title when May won national title.
2019	Payton May	Vancouver	17	Miss Greater Vancouver's Outstanding Teen (open)	Vocal, "Over the Rainbow"	Winner	Preliminary Evening Wear/OSQ Award	Previously Top 10 at Miss Washington's Outstanding Teen 2018
2018	Novalee Lewis	Tacoma	14	Miss Emerald City's Outstanding Teen	Tap Dance			Previously Miss Junior High School America 2016 Later Miss Rhode Island High School 2020 Later Miss Washington Teen USA 2021
2017	Tia Moua	Spokane	15	Miss Spokane's Outstanding Teen	Jazz Dance		Spirit of America	First Hmong-American state titleholder in the Miss America program Previously Third Runner Up at Miss Washington's Outstanding Teen 2015, also as Miss Spokane's Outstanding Teen
2016	Vivian Dao	Auburn	16	Miss Liberty's Outstanding Teen (open)	Piano, "Game of Thrones Theme" by Ramin Djawadi			Graduated from the University of Washington at 20 Previously Third Runner Up at Miss Washington's Outstanding Teen 2014
2015	Abigail Dominguiano	Bremerton	15	Miss Great Peninsula's Outstanding Teen (open)	Musical Theater Vocal, "Shy" from the musical Once Upon a Mattress			
2014	Tayler Plunkett	Kennewick	16	Miss Sun Valley Outstanding Teen	Classical Vocal		Non-finalist Evening Wear Award Preliminary Evening Wear/OSQ Award	Previously Second Runner Up at Miss Washington's Outstanding Teen 2013. Later Fourth Runner Up at Miss Washington 2017. Competed at Miss Kentucky 2021 and 2022.
2013	Haley Downey	Lake Stevens	16	Miss Puget Sound's Outstanding Teen (open)	Harp			Previously competed at Miss Washington's Outstanding Teen 2012
2012	Janae Calaway	Kennewick	17	Miss Tri-Cities' Outstanding Teen	Jazz Dance	Top 12	Advertising Award America's Choice Award	Later Fourth Runner Up and Preliminary talent winner at Miss Washington 2014. Top 10 and Preliminary Swimsuit Winner at Miss Washington 2015.
2011	Nicole Renard	Kennewick	16	Miss Tri-Cities' Outstanding Teen	Dance		Non-finalist Talent Award Preliminary Talent Award	Younger sister of Miss Washington's Outstanding Teen 2010, Victoria Renard Later Distinguished Young Woman of America 2013 Later Miss Washington 2017
2010	Victoria Renard	Kennewick	17	Miss Benton County's Outstanding Teen (open)	Dance	3rd runner-up		Older sister of Miss Washington's Outstanding Teen 2011, Nicole Renard 2nd Runner Up at Miss Washington's Outstanding Teen 2009 Competed at Miss Oklahoma 2012 and 2013
2009	Reina Almon	Yakima	17	Miss Apple Valley's Outstanding Teen	Vocal			Third Runner Up at Miss Washington's Outstanding Teen 2008 Contestant at National Sweetheart 2012 Later Miss Washington 2013
2008	Tori Knight	Puyallup	16	Miss Pierce County's Outstanding Teen	Vocal			Later Miss Auburn 2013 and competed at Miss Washington 2013
2007	Genay Tucker	Vancouver	16	Miss Greater Vancouver's Outstanding Teen	Tap Dance			Third Runner Up at Miss Washington 2011, competed at Miss Washington 2013
2006	Stefanie Range	Auburn	13	Miss Lakeland Hills' Outstanding Teen	Broadway Vocal, "Shy" from the Musical Once Upon a Mattress			
2005	Shalane Larango	Ridgefield	16	Miss Clark County's Outstanding Teen	Dance	2nd runner-up		Later Miss Washington Teen USA 2007 First former Miss America's Outstanding Teen state titleholder to compete in Miss Teen USA
2004	Sadie Porter	Selah			Dance	No national pageant		Later Miss Washington Teen USA 2009; Top 15 at Miss Teen USA 2009 pageant
