= I Can't Stand Still =

Studio album by Don Henley
- Released: August 13, 1982
- Recorded: January–May 1982
- Studios: Record One (Los Angeles, California)
- Genres: Rock; hard rock; soft rock
- Length: 42:22
- Label: Asylum
- Producers: Don Henley; Danny Kortchmar; Greg Ladanyi

Don Henley chronology
I Can't Stand Still (1982)	Building the Perfect Beast (1984)

Singles from I Can't Stand Still
- 1. "Johnny Can't Read" Released: August 3, 1982; 2. "Dirty Laundry" Released: October 12, 1982; 3. "I Can't Stand Still" Released: December 1982

Professional ratings
Review scores
Source	Rating
AllMusic	3/5 stars
Robert Christgau	B+
The New Rolling Stone Album Guide	1.5/5 stars

I Can't Stand Still is the debut solo studio album by American musician Don Henley, drummer and co-lead vocalist for the Eagles. It was released in August 1982 by Asylum Records. Henley, Danny Kortchmar and Greg Ladanyi produced the album. I Can't Stand Still achieved gold status, and peaked at No. 24 on the Billboard 200 and at the same position on the UK Albums Chart. Three singles were released from the album, including the hit "Dirty Laundry", which peaked at No. 3 on the Billboard Hot 100 and became Henley's best-selling single. The title track "I Can't Stand Still" reached No. 48 and the track "Johnny Can't Read" reached No. 42 on the charts.

The album showcased some of Henley's frustrations at the time. "Dirty Laundry" displays his disgust with the media and tabloid news coverage, and "Johnny Can't Read," shows his displeasure with the American educational system.

== Critical reception ==
Robert Palmer, music critic for The New York Times, was surprised by I Can't Stand Still and wrote that it "rings with the righteous indignation of a man who has taken a good look at what's going on around him and decided at least to speak his mind about it...The record doesn't offer any solutions, but how many pop records do? I Can't Stand Still scores points for its palpable anger; for its lean, stripped-down arrangements; for the lack of self-indulgence in the playing, the production and Mr. Henley's soaring vocals, and for its overall point of view, which links the disparate songs together and gives the album an admirable coherence. As far as this listener is concerned, it's better than anything Mr. Henley did with the Eagles."

Reviewing retrospectively for AllMusic, critic Mike DeGagne has written of the album, "Henley's first solo album may still have had the ghost of the Eagles lingering in the corners, but for the most part it showcases his stalwart partnership with producer and songwriter Danny Kortchmar," and then added "Henley's adept combination of lyrical wit and thought-provoking staidness begins to materialize on I Can't Stand Still, paving the way for an extremely accomplished solo career."

Cash Box said of the title track that "using the same organ that made "Laundry" so unique, Henley weaves the chords through a ballad about a guy's bitterness over his lost love's new find." Cash Box also said that it's "a slow, dramatic, organ-dominated tune that's almost, but not quite, reggae" and that Henley's vocal tingles with a jealous edge as he sings of his lover's 'undercover' relationship." Billboard called it "reggae California style, using heavy bass and syncopated organ for the rhythm track." AllMusic critic Mike DeGagne called it "a trouble-in-paradise love song, [that] has Henley pouring his heart out with sugary angst, but is helped along with some avid keyboard work."

== Track listing ==
All tracks are written by Don Henley and Danny Kortchmar, except where noted.

Side one
No.	Title	Writer(s)	Length
1.	"I Can't Stand Still"		3:33
2.	"You Better Hang Up"	Danny Kortchmar	3:21
3.	"Long Way Home"		5:28
4.	"Nobody's Business"	Don Henley; Bob Seger; JD Souther	3:43
5.	"Talking to the Moon"	Henley; Souther	4:39

Side two
No.	Title	Writer(s)	Length
6.	"Dirty Laundry"		5:36
7.	"Johnny Can't Read"		3:24
8.	"Them and Us"		4:01
9.	"La Eile"	Traditional	0:52
10.	"Lilah"		4:09
11.	"The Unclouded Day"	Josiah K. Alwood; J.F. Kinsey	3:36
Total length:			42:22

== Personnel ==
Musicians

- Don Henley – lead vocals, harmony vocals (1), drums (1, 2, 8, 10), backing vocals (3, 6), arrangements (11)
- Danny Kortchmar – keyboards (1), guitars (1), electric guitar (2, 4, 5, 8, 10), baritone guitar (3, 7, 11), rhythm guitar (6), backing vocals (6), arrangements (11)
- Benmont Tench – keyboards (3–5, 11), acoustic piano (5, 10)
- Garth Hudson – synthesizers (5)
- Steve Porcaro – synthesizers (5), keyboards (6), special keyboard effects (6)
- Roger Linn – special effects (6)
- Andrew Gold – keyboards (7)
- Steve Lukather – electric guitar (2), acoustic guitar (5), 2nd guitar solo (6)
- Waddy Wachtel – electric guitar (4, 11), slide guitar (10)
- Joe Walsh – 1st guitar solo (6)
- Bob Glaub – bass (1, 2, 7, 11)
- Leland Sklar – bass (3, 10)
- Kenny Edwards – bass (5, 8), electric guitar (7)
- Jeff Porcaro – drums (2, 3, 5, 6), maracas (2)
- Russ Kunkel – drums (4)
- Mark Towner Williams – drums (7)
- Ian Wallace – drums (11)
- Steve Forman – percussion (3)
- Ras Baboo – percussion (11), timbales (11)
- Derek Bell – harp (9)
- Paddy Moloney – tin whistle (9), original arrangements (9), Uilleann pipes (10)
- Timothy B. Schmit – harmony vocals (1, 2), backing vocals (3, 6), bass (4, 6)
- Max Gronenthal – harmony vocals (1)
- JD Souther – harmony vocals (2), acoustic guitar (3, 4, 10)
- George Gruel – backing vocals (6)
- Louise Goffin – harmony vocals (7)
- Maren Jensen – harmony vocals (7)
- Warren Zevon – backing vocals (8)
- Bill Withers – backing vocals (11)

Production and artwork

- Don Henley – producer
- Danny Kortchmar – producer
- Greg Ladanyi – producer, recording, mixing
- Niko Bolas – additional engineer, assistant engineer
- Jim Nipar – additional engineer
- Jamie Ledner – assistant engineer
- Wayne Tanouye – assistant engineer
- Doug Sax – mastering
- Mike Reese – mastering
- The Mastering Lab (Hollywood, California) – mastering location
- Paul Gurian – art direction
- Ron Coro – graphic coordinator
- Kristen Kasell Nikosey – graphic coordinator
- Jo Ann Callis – photography
- Front Line Management – management

== Charts ==
Chart (1982–1983)	Peak position
Australian Albums (Kent Music Report)	24
Canada Top Albums/CDs (RPM)	5
Dutch Albums (Album Top 100)	46
Japanese Albums (Oricon)	20
New Zealand Albums (RMNZ)	14
Norwegian Albums (VG-lista)	22
Swedish Albums (Sverigetopplistan)	34
US Billboard 200	24

== Certifications ==
Region	Certification	Certified units/sales
United States (RIAA)	Gold	500,000^{^}
^{^} Shipments figures based on certification alone.
