= Annapolis, Washington =

- Unincorporated community
- Etymology: Annapolis, Maryland
- Location in Washington and the United States Annapolis (the United States)
- Coordinates: 47°32′51.6″N 122°37′14.6″W
- Country: United States
- State: Washington
- County: Kitsap
- Named for: Annapolis, Maryland
- Elevation: 52 ft (16 m)
- Time zone: UTC-8 (Pacific (PST))
  - Summer (DST): UTC-7 (PDT)
- ZIP codes: 98366
- Area code: 360

Annapolis is an unincorporated community located in Kitsap County, Washington. A foot ferry operated by Kitsap Transit connects Annapolis to nearby Bremerton. Annapolis is bordered by the city of Port Orchard to the west and by unincorporated Kitsap County, approaching Manchester, to the east.
