= When the Whistle Blows =

American comedy television series

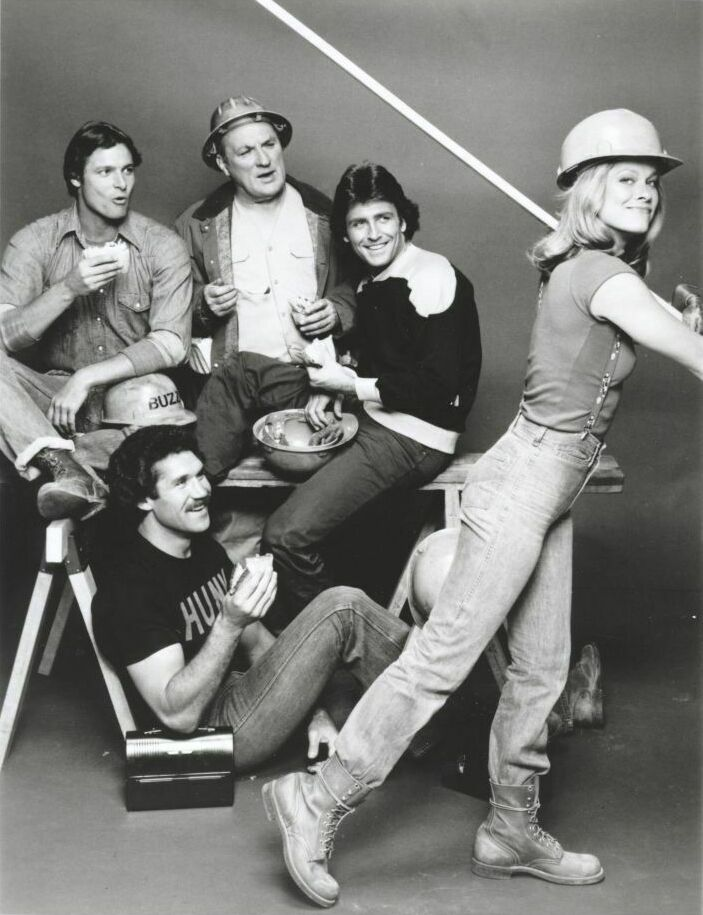
- Cast of When the Whistle Blows. L to r: Douglas Barr, Tim Rossovich, Dolph Sweet, Philip Brown, Susan Buckner
- Created by: Chuck Gordon; Tom Kartozian
- Written by: Chuck Gordon; Tom Kartozian; Robert Sherman
- Directed by: Christian I. Nyby II; Edward Parone; Michael Preece
- Starring: Dolph Sweet; Doug Barr; Susan Buckner; Philip Brown; Tim Rossovich; Sue Ane Langdon
- Theme music composer: Mark Snow
- Opening theme: "When the Whistle Blows" performed by Jerry Whitman and the Sweet Inspirations
- Ending theme: "When the Whistle Blows" (instrumental)
- Composers: Molly-Ann Leikin; Mark Snow
- Country of origin: United States
- Original language: English
- No. of seasons: 1
- No. of episodes: 10

Production
- Producers: Gerald Sanford; Carroll Newman
- Cinematography: Emil Oster
- Editors: Ralph Schoenfeld; Harvey E. Stambler
- Running time: 60 minutes
- Production companies: Daydream Productions; Universal Television

Original release
- Network: ABC
- Release: March 14 – July 20, 1980

When the Whistle Blows is an American comedy television series that aired for 10 hour-long episodes on ABC from March 14 to July 20, 1980. The series was produced by Universal Television and starred Dolph Sweet, Doug Barr, Susan Buckner, Philip Brown and Tim Rossovich. It was filmed single-camera style and without a laugh track.

== Summary ==
The series revolves around a group of construction workers – four males (Norm, Buzz, Randy, and Hunk) and one female (Lucy) – for the "Tri-State Construction Company" in Los Angeles and their search for fun both on and off the job. After hours, the gang's favorite hangout is a saloon called "Darlene's", run by Darlene Ridgeway.

== Cast ==
- Dolph Sweet as Norm Jenkins
- Doug Barr as Buzz Dillard
- Susan Buckner as Lucy Davis
- Philip Brown as Randy Hartford
- Tim Rossovich as Martin "Hunk" Kincaid
- Sue Ane Langdon as Darlene Ridgeway

== Episodes ==
No.	Title	Directed by	Written by	Original release date
1	"Pilot"	Unknown	Unknown	March 14, 1980
2	"Love Is a Four-Letter Word"	Unknown	Unknown	March 21, 1980
3	"Macho Man"	Unknown	Unknown	March 28, 1980
4	"Wildcatters"	Unknown	Unknown	April 4, 1980
5	"God's Country"	Unknown	Unknown	April 11, 1980
6	"Somebody's Daughter"	Unknown	Unknown	April 18, 1980
7	"Miss Hard Hat USA"	Christian I. Nyby II	Robert Sherman	April 25, 1980
8	"The House that Roared"	Unknown	Unknown	June 7, 1980
9	"Love in the Fast Lane"	Unknown	Unknown	June 14, 1980
10	"Run for the Roses"	Unknown	Unknown	July 20, 1980
