= Port Orchard, Washington =

City in Washington, United States

- City
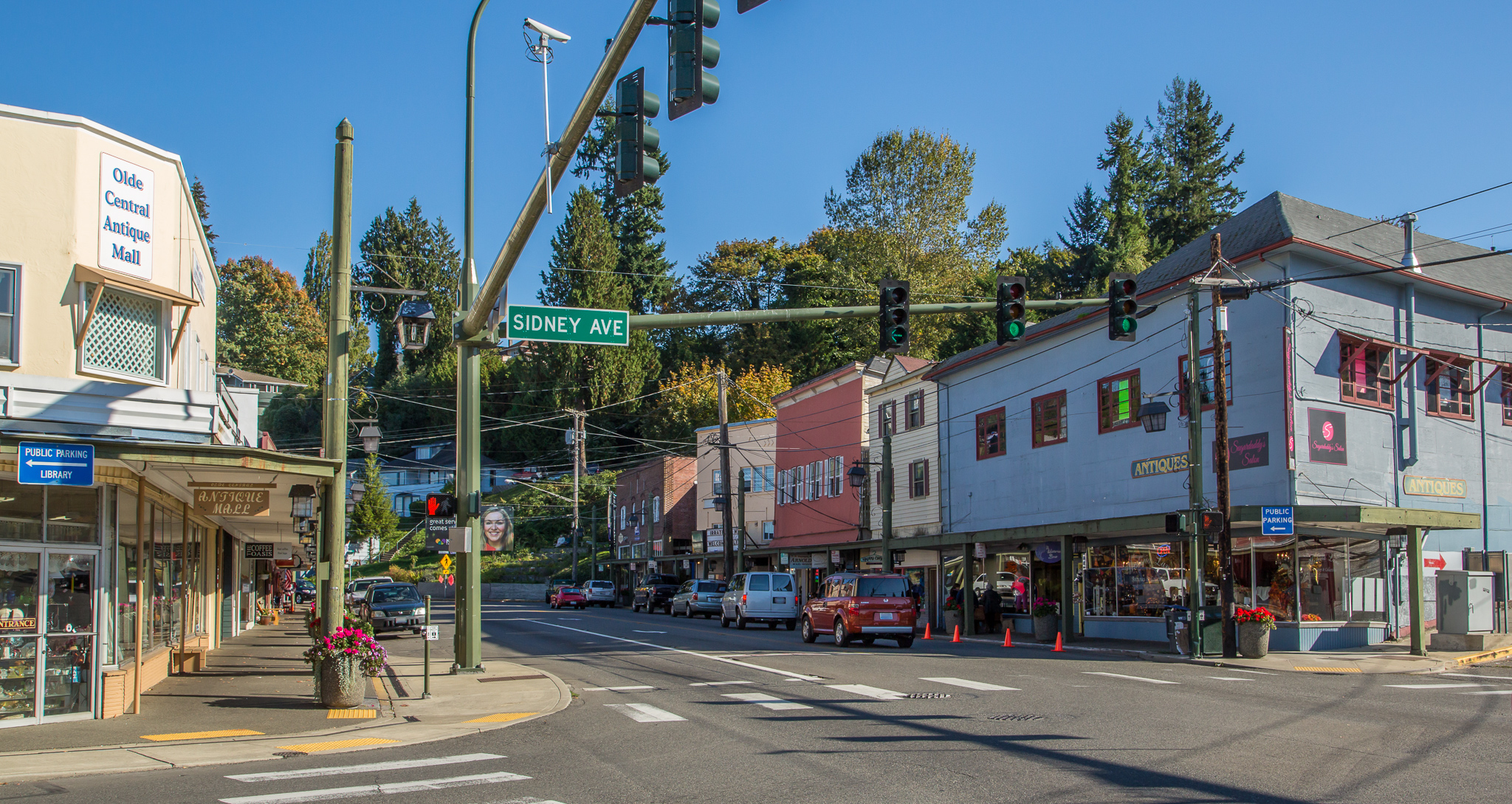
- Corner of Bay St. and Sidney Ave.

- Location of Port Orchard in Kitsap County
- Coordinates: 47°31′54″N 122°38′18″W
- Country: United States
- State: Washington
- County: Kitsap
- Incorporated: September 15, 1890

Government
  - Type: Mayor–council
  - Mayor: Robert Putaansuu

Area
  - Total: 11.21 sq mi (29.03 km^{2})
  - Land: 9.64 sq mi (24.98 km^{2})
  - Water: 1.56 sq mi (4.05 km^{2})
- Elevation: 430 ft (130 m)

Population (2020)
  - Total: 15,587
  - Estimate (2022): 17,089
  - Density: 1,772/sq mi (684.2/km^{2})
- Time zone: UTC–8 (Pacific (PST))
  - Summer (DST): UTC–7 (PDT)
- ZIP codes: 98366–98367
- Area codes: 360, 564
- FIPS code: 53-55785
- GNIS feature ID: 2411466
- Website: portorchardwa.gov

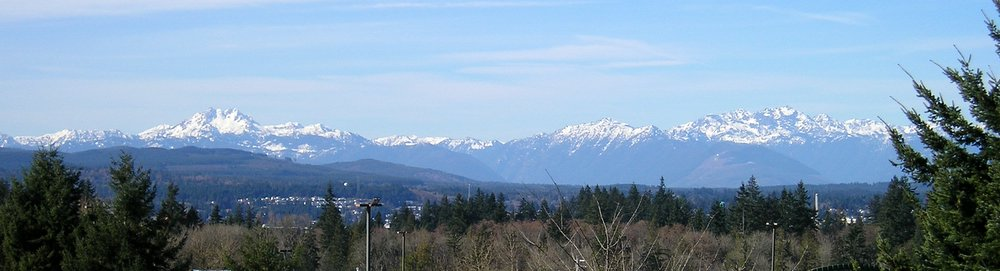
The Olympic Mountains, visible while looking west from Port Orchard

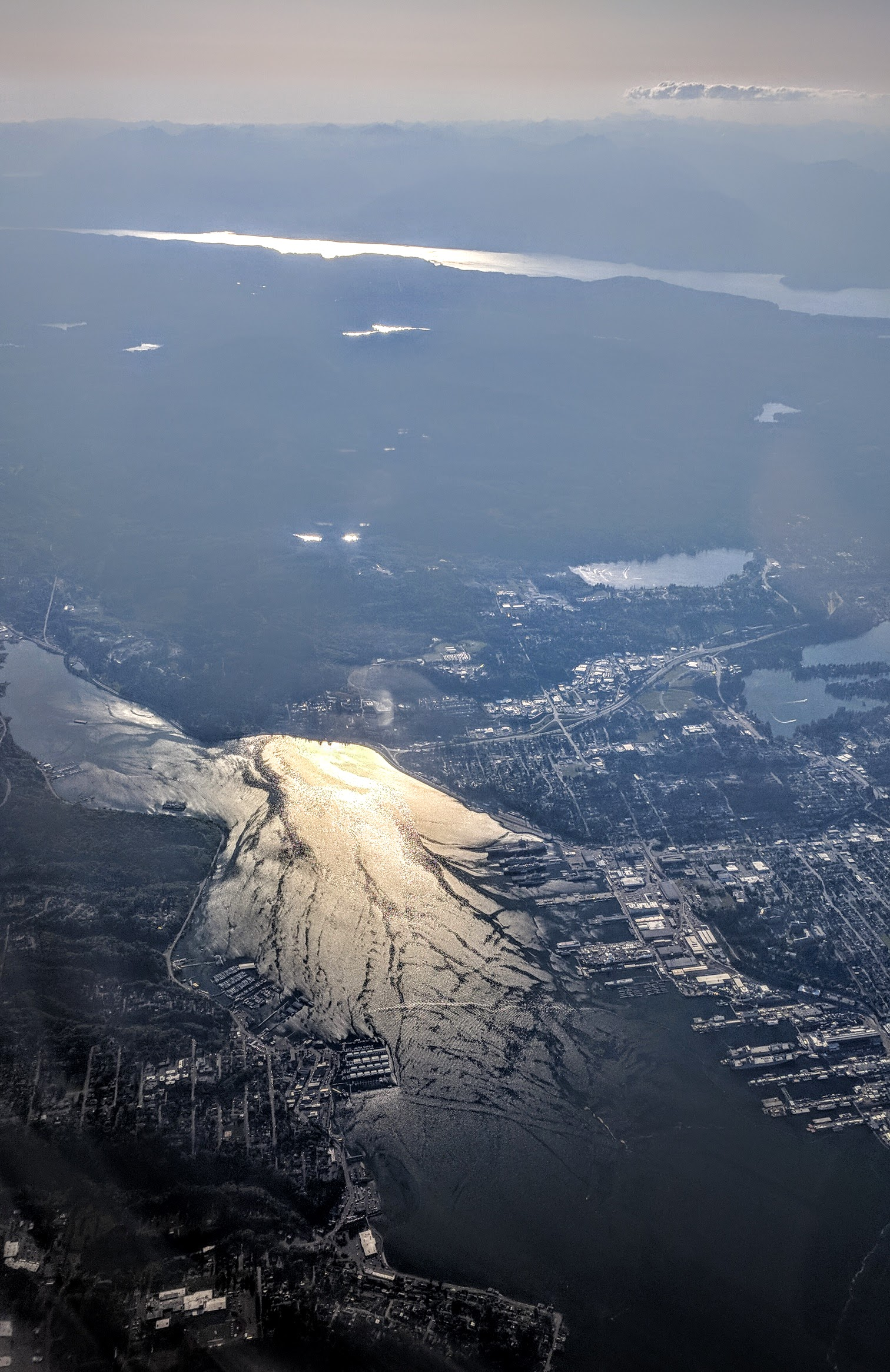
West-looking afternoon aerial view of Sinclair Inlet, with Bremerton on the north (right) side, Port Orchard on the south (left) side; Hood Canal in the background

Port Orchard is a city in and the county seat of Kitsap County, Washington, United States. It is located 13 miles (21 km) due west of West Seattle and south from Bremerton across Sinclair Inlet. Port Orchard is connected to Seattle and Vashon Island via the Washington State Ferries run to Southworth. The city is named after Port Orchard, the strait that separates Bainbridge Island from the Kitsap Peninsula.

The population was 15,587 in the 2020 census, and estimated to be 17,089 in 2022. Together with its two major suburbs, East Port Orchard and Parkwood, the population is over 28,000.

== History ==
Port Orchard Bay was Named By Captain Vancouver in 1792. The first European-Americans to settle in what is now Port Orchard were William Renton and Daniel Howard, who set up a sawmill there in 1854. The town that was to become Port Orchard was originally platted in 1886 by Frederick Stevens, who named the new location after his father, Sidney. The town of Sidney was incorporated September 15, 1890, and was the first in Kitsap County to be both platted and incorporated. Shortly thereafter, the U.S. Navy sought a suitable location for another installation on the West Coast, and found it with the assistance of Sidney's residents in Orchard Bay (this installation would later become the Puget Sound Naval Shipyard in Bremerton).

The county seat was originally in Port Madison, but moved to Sidney after a popular vote in 1892. In December of that same year, the residents of Sidney petitioned both the state legislature and the Post Office Department to rename the city "Port Orchard". The legislature refused, as Charleston (now West Bremerton) had also requested that name. The Post Office Department, however, went through with the name change, and as a result the Port Orchard post office ended up in Sidney, and the Charleston post office ended up in Port Orchard. It wasn't until 1903 that local politician Will Thompson convinced the state legislature to correct this confusing situation, and relocated the Charleston post office to Charleston, at the same time renaming Sidney "Port Orchard", as it is known today.

A new city hall was opened in May 1999, replacing a seismically vulnerable building constructed in 1947. It was to be a catalyst for new development in the city's downtown.

On December 18, 2018, a cul-de-sac in Port Orchard was struck by an EF2 tornado with winds between 120 and 130 miles per hour (190 and 210 km/h), the strongest tornado in Washington since 1986. The tornado uprooted trees and damaged up to 450 homes and businesses, some of which sustained total roof loss. Some neighborhoods were evacuated due to reported gas leaks.

== Geography ==
Port Orchard is located in south-central Kitsap County on the south side of Sinclair Inlet, an arm of the Port Orchard strait connecting to Puget Sound. The city is bordered to the north across Sinclair Inlet by the city of Bremerton.

According to the United States Census Bureau, the city has a total area of 11.21 square miles (29.03 km^{2}), of which 9.64 square miles (24.97 km^{2}) are land and 1.57 square miles (4.07 km^{2}), or 15.65%, are water.

The city is home to South Kitsap Regional Park, a 209-acre (85 ha) public park with multiple sports fields, hiking trails, a playground, a skate park, and batting cages.

== Demographics ==
Historical population
Census	Pop.	Note	%±
1890	226		—
1900	254		12.4%
1910	682		168.5%
1920	1,393		104.3%
1930	1,145		−17.8%
1940	1,566		36.8%
1950	2,320		48.1%
1960	2,778		19.7%
1970	3,904		40.5%
1980	4,787		22.6%
1990	4,984		4.1%
2000	7,693		54.4%
2010	11,144		44.9%
2020	15,587		39.9%
2022 (est.)	17,089		9.6%
U.S. Decennial Census; 2020 Census

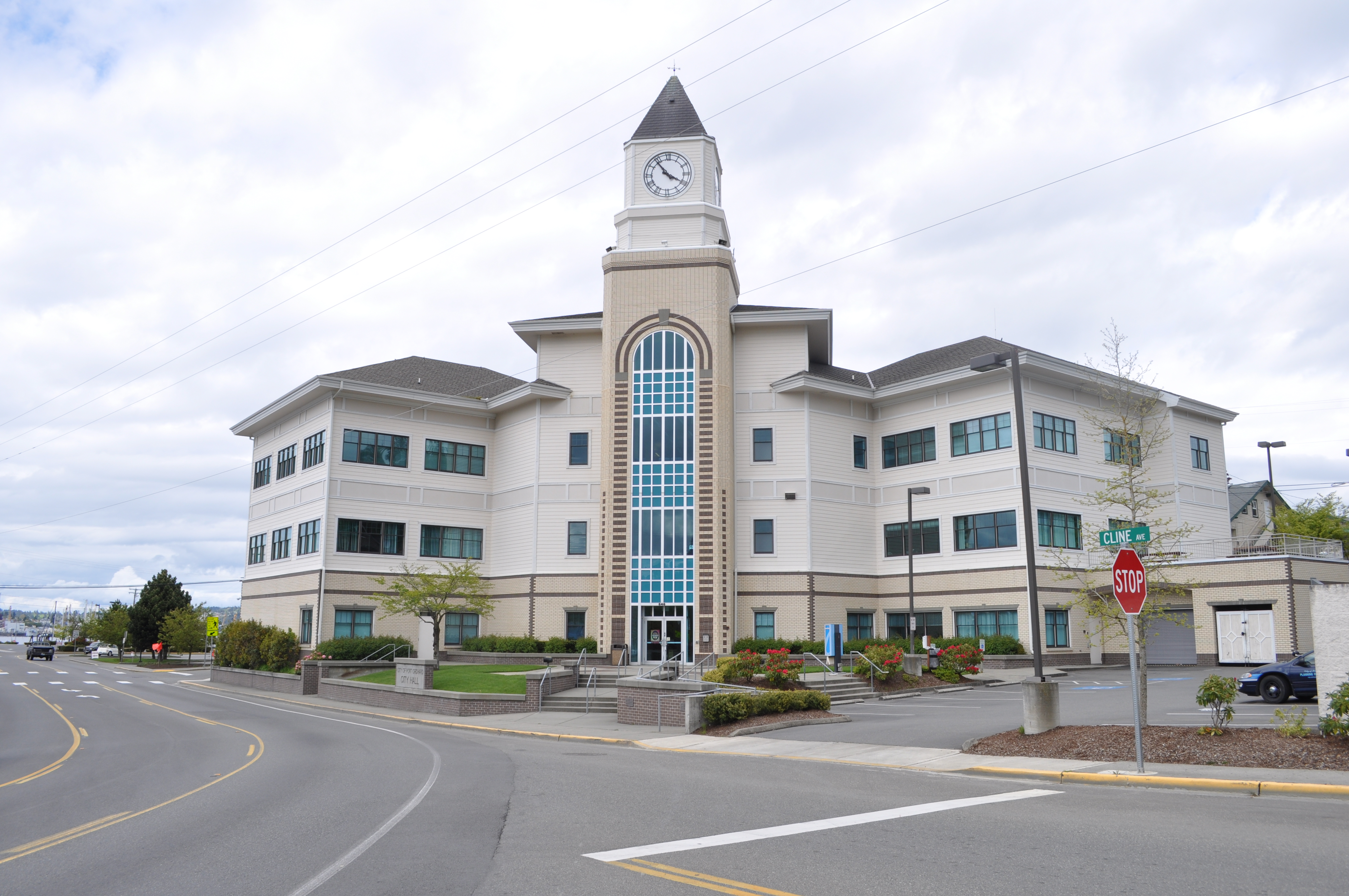
Port Orchard City Hall

=== 2020 census ===
As of the 2020 census, there were 15,587 people, 5,840 households, and 3,894 families residing in the city.

The median age was 35.7 years, with 23.1% of residents under the age of 18 and 15.7% of residents 65 years of age or older. For every 100 females there were 98.3 males, and for every 100 females age 18 and over there were 96.3 males age 18 and over.

99.6% of residents lived in urban areas, while 0.4% lived in rural areas.

There were 5,840 households in Port Orchard, of which 33.8% had children under the age of 18 living in them. Of all households, 48.8% were married-couple households, 17.9% were households with a male householder and no spouse or partner present, and 24.8% were households with a female householder and no spouse or partner present. About 24.5% of all households were made up of individuals and 9.7% had someone living alone who was 65 years of age or older.

There were 6,209 housing units, of which 5.9% were vacant. The homeowner vacancy rate was 1.3% and the rental vacancy rate was 6.5%.

Racial composition as of the 2020 census
Race	Number	Percent
White	11,069	71.0%
Black or African American	530	3.4%
American Indian and Alaska Native	217	1.4%
Asian	1,069	6.9%
Native Hawaiian and Other Pacific Islander	268	1.7%
Some other race	368	2.4%
Two or more races	2,066	13.3%
Hispanic or Latino (of any race)	1,502	9.6%

=== 2010 census ===
As of the 2010 census, there were 11,144 people, 4,278 households, and 2,726 families residing in the city. The population density was 1,539.2 inhabitants per square mile (594.3/km^{2}). There were 4,630 housing units at an average density of 639.5 per square mile (246.9/km^{2}). The racial makeup of the city was 80.8% White, 3.4% African American, 1.3% Native American, 5.8% Asian, 1.4% Pacific Islander, 1.0% from other races, and 6.4% from two or more races. Hispanic or Latino of any race were 6.6% of the population.

There were 4,278 households, of which 33.0% had children under the age of 18 living with them, 45.7% were married couples living together, 13.3% had a female householder with no husband present, 4.6% had a male householder with no wife present, and 36.3% were non-families. 27.7% of all households were made up of individuals, and 9.5% had someone living alone who was 65 years of age or older. The average household size was 2.43 and the average family size was 2.96.

The median age in the city was 34.5 years. 23.5% of residents were under the age of 18; 10.4% were between the ages of 18 and 24; 29.1% were from 25 to 44; 23.4% were from 45 to 64; and 13.5% were 65 years of age or older. The gender makeup of the city was 50.3% male and 49.7% female.

== Culture ==
Port Orchard hosts the annual Mosquito Fleet Fest, a street fair and maritime exhibition named for the historic mosquito fleet ferries that served Puget Sound. The festival is organized by the Port Orchard Waterfront Alliance and has been held since 2024 around Memorial Day in late May. It features vendors, live entertainment, contests, and a series of sailings and exhibits on Carlisle II and Virginia V, two of the oldest remaining ferries in the region.

=== Media ===
The Port Orchard Independent is a weekly newspaper published in the city and owned by Sound Publishing, which also owns five other newspapers on the Kitsap Peninsula. The newspaper was founded in 1890 as the Sidney Independent and merged with other papers in the area. The Kitsap Sun, a daily newspaper published in Bremerton, also serves Port Orchard.

== Education ==
Port Orchard is served by the South Kitsap School District, which provides public K–12 education for the southern half of Kitsap County. The school district had an enrollment of 9,326 total students during the 2024–25 academic year at one high school, three middle schools, ten elementary schools, and two alternative schools. South Kitsap High School opened in 1921 to alleviate crowding at Union High School in Bremerton. Since the 2010s, South Kitsap has been described as an "overcrowded" facility with an enrollment of over 2,800 students; several attempts to issue bonds to build a second high school for the district were rejected by voters.

== Infrastructure ==
=== Transportation ===
Port Orchard is near the north end of State Route 16, a regional freeway that connects the Kitsap Peninsula to Tacoma via the Tacoma Narrows Bridge. Two other state highways pass through the city limits: State Route 160, which connects the freeway to the Southworth ferry terminal; and State Route 166, which travels through downtown Port Orchard on Bay Street. The city's public transit is provided by Kitsap Transit, which operates a network of ferries and buses. The agency's foot ferries travel 10 minutes across Sinclair Inlet to the Bremerton Transportation Center from terminals in downtown Port Orchard and Annapolis. The Port Orchard route runs on weekdays and weekends, while the Annapolis ferry only operates during rush hours on weekdays; the foot ferries carried a combined 374,336 passengers in 2024. Several bus routes serve the Port Orchard terminal and connect to other areas of the city.

Port Orchard Airport, located 7 miles (11 km) south of the city, is a private airport with an industrial park.

== Notable people ==
- Willie Bloomquist, professional baseball player
- Delilah, syndicated radio personality
- Jason Ellison, professional baseball player
- Jamie Ford, author
- Karolyn Grimes, actress in It's a Wonderful Life
- Jason Hammel, professional baseball player
- Debbie Macomber, author
- Benji Olson, professional American football player
- Madelaine Petsch, actress
- Emily Randall, politician and U.S. representative for Washington
- Jason Wade, singer and guitarist of Lifehouse
