= Deadly Blessing =

1981 film by Wes Craven

- Theatrical release poster
- Directed by: Wes Craven
- Screenplay by: Glenn M. Benest; Matthew Barr; Wes Craven
- Story by: Glenn M. Benest; Matthew Barr
- Produced by: Patricia Herskovic; Max A. Keller; Micheline H. Keller
- Starring: Maren Jensen; Lisa Hartman; Sharon Stone; Susan Buckner; Jeff East; Lois Nettleton; Ernest Borgnine
- Cinematography: Robert Jessup
- Edited by: Robert Bracken
- Music by: James Horner
- Production companies: PolyGram Pictures; Inter Planetary
- Distributed by: United Artists
- Release date: August 14, 1981
- Running time: 102 minutes
- Country: United States
- Language: English
- Budget: $2.5 million–3 million
- Box office: $8.3 million

Deadly Blessing is a 1981 American supernatural slasher film directed by Wes Craven and starring Maren Jensen, Susan Buckner, Sharon Stone, Jeff East, and Ernest Borgnine. The film tells the story of a strange figure committing murder in a contemporary farming community adjacent to a religious sect that believes in ancient evil and curses.

Craven became involved in the project through producer Max A. Keller, who had cowritten and produced Craven's previous directorial credit, Stranger in Our House (1978). Deadly Blessing was shot on location in Texas in late 1980 and distributed through United Artists, marking Craven's first major studio feature. Released in the summer of 1981, it received mixed reviews from critics but was a modest box office success, grossing over $8 million in the United States.

== Plot ==
Martha and Jim Schmidt live on an isolated Pennsylvania farm named "Our Blessing." Most of their neighbors are Hittites, an austere religious community led by Jim's father Isaiah Schmidt, who forbids any interaction with non-Hittites. After breaking up a fight between one Hittite member, William Gluntz, and another, more artistically-minded neighbor, Faith Stohler, Jim finds the word "incubus" scrawled on the wall of his barn. Later that night, Jim is killed when his tractor suddenly starts up and crushes him against a wall. Isaiah and other Hittites observe Jim's funeral, as he was a lapsed member of their community; they consider Martha to be an incubus for having lured him away from their religion.

Martha's friends Lana Marcus and Vicky Anderson visit the farm, hoping to persuade her to return to Los Angeles. While creeping around Our Blessing at night, William is stabbed in the back by a black-clad figure. The following day, while looking for William, Isaiah offers to buy the farm from Martha, but she angrily refuses. Lana is nearly trapped in the barn by the black-clad figure. As she escapes, she finds William's corpse hanging from a rope.

The Sheriff advises the three friends to leave town, as someone may be after them, but they decide to stay against his advice. When Isaiah finds out that Jim's brother John has been seeing Vicky, he beats then exiles him. John meets Vicky outside the local cinema and she lets John drive her car, giving him a sense of freedom. They stop at the side of a road and begin to make out but they are killed by the black-clad figure.

Lana, overwhelmed by disturbing dreams, begins to believe that death is pursuing her. Martha discovers that Jim's grave has been dug up and the casket filled with chickens from the Stohlers' farm. Inside the Stohlers' barn, she finds Jim's body and an altar to her. John's estranged fiancée Melissa arrives reciting a ritual of exorcism but is attacked by Faith's mother, Louisa. It is revealed that Faith and Louisa, who hate the Hittites, have been the black-dressed figures murdering them. Martha struggles with them and tears open Faith's shirt, revealing her to be a transsexual who has been in love with Martha. Faith and Louisa pursue Martha to Our Blessing. There, Lana kills Louisa and a late-arriving Melissa stabs Faith to death. In a religious fervor, Melissa threatens Martha next, but Isaiah arrives and assures her that the messenger of the incubus has already been killed.

The following day, Lana departs to her home in Los Angeles. Martha, alone in the farmhouse, is visited by Jim's ghost who tries to warn her, before the incubus bursts through the floor and drags Martha to hell.

== Cast ==
- Maren Jensen as Martha Schmidt
- Sharon Stone as Lana Marcus
- Susan Buckner as Vicky Anderson
- Jeff East as John Schmidt
- Colleen Riley as Melissa
- Douglas Barr as Jim Schmidt
- Lisa Hartman as Faith Stohler
- Lois Nettleton as Louisa Stohler
- Ernest Borgnine as Isaiah Schmidt
- Michael Berryman as William Gluntz
- Kevin Cooney as Sheriff

== Production ==
=== Development ===
After directing the television horror film Stranger in Our House (1978) under producer Max Keller, Wes Craven was offered to assist in rewrites on Keller's subsequent project, Deadly Blessing. Keller had been impressed by Craven's impromptu rewrites during the filming of Stranger in Our House. The original screenplay for Deadly Blessing had been cowritten by Glenn M. Benest, who had also cowritten Stranger in Our House.

=== Filming ===
Deadly Blessing was filmed on location in Dallas, Ennis, and Waxahachie, Texas. Filming began on November 10, 1980, with a projected completion date of December 22, 1980. Ernest Borgnine took a brief hiatus from filming after being thrown from a horse-drawn buggy and injuring his back.

According to Craven, as the film marked his first feature for a major studio, he sought to create a more glossy and professional film: "I wanted a big, smooth, sort of Philip Wylie look to it. We very consciously went in with that intention. Robert Jessup, the cinematographer, and I went to Philip Wylie's books and Van Gogh's paintings for the looks of the house down the lane and the young woman's paintings."

Special effects for the incubus entity that appears at the end of the film were originally going to be designed by John Dykstra, but after Dykstra was forced to drop out of the project due to his obligations on Firefox (1982), Everett Alson and Ira Anderson replaced him.

== Release ==
Universal Pictures, the primary distributor for PolyGram-produced films at the time, chose not to pick up the finished project; it was instead released in theaters by United Artists and was the final United Artists film to be owned by Transamerica Corporation after being acquired by Metro-Goldwyn-Mayer on July 28, 1981.

United Artists released Deadly Blessing theatrically in the United States on August 14, 1981. During some of the film's theatrical exhibitions, independent theater owners would eliminate the final twist ending scene in the film—its sole supernatural sequence—in which the incubus bursts through the floor and drags Martha Schmidt (Maren Jensen) below.

=== Home media ===
Embassy Home Entertainment released the film on VHS in 1986.

On January 22, 2013, Scream Factory released a Collector's Edition of the film on Blu-ray and DVD under license from Universal Studios.

In March 2026, Kino Lorber announced a 4K UHD release of the film featuring a new HDR/Dolby Vision master, which was released on July 28, 2026.

== Reception ==
=== Box office ===
The film was a modest box office success, grossing $8,279,042.

=== Critical response ===
Deadly Blessing received mixed reviews upon its original release. On the review aggregator website Rotten Tomatoes, 44% of 9 critics' reviews are positive. Metacritic, which uses a weighted average, assigned the film a score of 56 out of 100, based on 6 critics, indicating "mixed or average" reviews. Ed Blank of The Pittsburgh Press criticized the film's dialogue and screenplay, but praised James Horner's "exceptionally stirring score." The Baltimore Sun critic Lou Cedrone praised the film for favoring suspense over violence, and deemed it "relatively respectable" compared to Craven's previous films. Janet Maslin of The New York Times praised Craven's direction, writing that he "has a flair for scaring his audience and an even more useful talent for making his characters comfortable and believable, even under the weirdest circumstances. The performances here are restrained and plausible, even from Mr. Borgnine, who appears in a long beard and a black hat playing someone called Isaiah."

Teddi Gibson-Bianchi of the Cleveland Press was conversely critical of the film, describing it as seedy and "muddled", summarizing: "Score 10 for violence; zero for taste, originality and credulity." Linda Gross of the Los Angeles Times praised the film's themes and religious commentary, editing, music, and cinematography, but faulted it for its "hallucinatory, spaced-out" tone.

Time Out wrote, "Deadly Blessing isn't a very good movie, but it holds out distinct promise that Craven will soon be in the front rank of horror filmmakers", calling it "an excellent example of a mundane project elevated into quite a palatable genre movie by its director."

=== Accolades ===
Institution	Year	Category	Recipient	Result	Ref.
Avoriaz Fantastic Film Festival	1982	Grand Prize	Wes Craven	Nominated	
Golden Raspberry Awards	1982	Worst Supporting Actor	Ernest Borgnine	Nominated	
Stinkers Bad Movie Awards	1982	Most Annoying Fake Accent — Female	Lisa Hartman	Nominated	

=== Themes ===
Film scholars and Craven biographers have noted that Deadly Blessing is one of his few films that explores explicit religious themes. Its theme of religious fundamentalism was partly drawn from Craven's own strict Christian upbringing. The film's final sequence, which features the supernatural incubus entity making an appearance, is noted by Craven biographer John Wooley: "With a hard-edged religion-based intolerance on display throughout Deadly Blessing, it's not surprising that some reviewers and critics were uncomfortable with the final scene of the picture, which allows a double-whammy denouement that not only reveals a gender surprise, but also suggests that the deeply unlikeable Isaiah and his hellfire-and-brimstone pronouncements were actually on the right track."

In her review of the film upon its theatrical release, The New York Times critic Janet Maslin commented that the film "ought to fascinate students of horror-film morality, because its notions of sin and retribution are so out of the ordinary... This movie also reveals an odd perception of sexual mores. One character's chief transgression appears to have been getting married; another character is punished for not wanting to marry. And the most promiscuous looking person in the story emerges perfectly unscathed at its conclusion."

== Sources ==
- Darowski, John; Berns, Fernando Gabriel Pagnoni, eds. (2023). A Critical Companion to Wes Craven. Lanham, Maryland: Lexington Books. ISBN 978-1-666-91907-3.
- Fischer, Dennis (2024). Horror Film Directors, 1931-1990. Jefferson, North Carolina: McFarland & Company. ISBN 978-1-476-60795-5.
- Wooley, John (2011). Wes Craven: The Man and His Nightmares. Hoboken, New Jersey: Wiley. ISBN 978-1-118-01275-8.
