= Maren Jensen =

American former model and actress

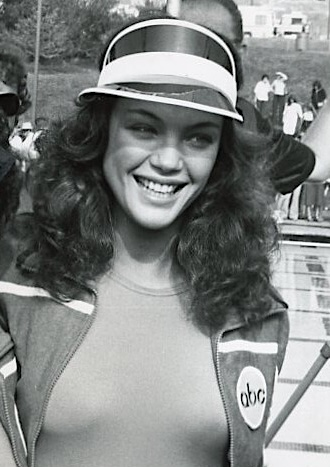
- Jensen in 1978
- Born: September 23, 1956 (age 69); Arcadia, California, U.S.
- Occupations: Actress; model; businesswoman
- Years active: 1978–1981
- Known for: Battlestar Galactica; Deadly Blessing
- Spouse: Johan Kugelberg
- Children: 1
- Website: glowbeautyfuel.com

Maren Kawehilani Jensen (born September 23, 1956) (Note: While an October 1978 newspaper article notes Jensen as a "21-year-old actress," the California Birth Index lists her birthdate as September 23, 1956. In the Variety's Who's Who in Show Business, her birthdate is also listed as September 23.) is an American former model and actress, best known for portraying Lieutenant Athena in the 1978–1979 television series Battlestar Galactica. Jensen also made guest appearances in several US television series, such as The Love Boat and Fantasy Island.

== Early life ==
Maren Kawehilani Jensen was born in Arcadia, California, and raised in Glendale. Her middle name means “the morning mist from heaven” in Hawaiian. Her father, Ralph Oscar Jensen, was a physician of Danish descent. Her mother is Winona (née Kanahele) Jensen.

Jensen attended Herbert Hoover High School from 1971 to 1974, and after graduating received a scholarship to attend the University of California, Los Angeles, where she majored in Theater Arts and Law. She dropped out after her third year.

== Career ==
While still in college, Jensen began a modeling career. She was featured on the covers of Vogue and Mademoiselle. A mutual friend introduced her to the agent Barbara Gale, who helped arrange two network commercials and a role in The Hardy Boys/Nancy Drew Mysteries in 1977. From 1978 to 1979, Jensen starred in Battlestar Galactica in the role of Lieutenant Athena. She was featured on the cover of TV Guide in April 1979. Her last known role was in Wes Craven's 1981 horror film Deadly Blessing alongside Sharon Stone. Her career was cut short by illness, after she contracted Epstein-Barr Syndrome. In 1993, Jensen co-founded the cosmetics brand Stila with celebrity makeup artist Jeanine Lobell, which became one of the best selling makeup brands in retailers like Sephora.

Jensen was a longtime companion of singer-songwriter Don Henley. In 1982, Henley released his first solo album, I Can't Stand Still, and dedicated it to her. She is credited for "Harmony Vocals" on the song "Johnny Can't Read," and is credited in the liner notes for having composed the piano intro and interlude on the song "A Month of Sundays" on Henley's 1984 album Building the Perfect Beast. She appeared in the video for Henley's song "Not Enough Love In the World" in 1985. Henley and Jensen were engaged, but they separated in 1986. Jensen helped Henley establish The Walden Woods Project in the early 1990s, an organization dedicated to protecting the Walden Woods area in Concord, Massachusetts from development.

In 2020, Jensen co-founded with Laura Shoemaker the company Glow Beauty Fuel, a maker of beauty protein bars.

== Personal life ==
Jensen was reported to be married to John Kugelberg and they were also reported to be separated. They have kept everything about their relationship very private and out of the public eye, including their marriage and separation dates. Neither has shared any photos together. She has been reported as living in the New York metro area and has been visiting the Los Angeles metro area from time to time because of business, family, and friends. She has a daughter and a stepson.

== Filmography ==
Film and Television
Year	Title	Role	Notes
1978	The Hardy Boys/Nancy Drew Mysteries	Maryann Dalton / Teri Turner	Episode: "Death Surf"
1978	Battlestar Galactica	Lieutenant Athena	Feature film
1978–79	Battlestar Galactica	Lieutenant Athena	Main role (21 episodes)
1979	The Love Boat	Suzanna Wells	Episode: "Love Me, Love My Dog/Poor Little Rich Girl/The Decision"
1980	Fantasy Island	Valerie	Episode: "Jungle Man/Mary Ann and Miss Sophisticate"
1980	The Love Boat	Sharon Patrick	Episode: "The Mallory Quest/Julie, the Vamp/The Offer"
1981	Beyond the Reef	Diana	Feature film
1981	Deadly Blessing	Martha Schmidt	Feature film
