= East Port Orchard, Washington =

- CDP
- Location of East Port Orchard, Washington
- Coordinates: 47°31′16″N 122°37′23″W
- Country: United States
- State: Washington
- County: Kitsap

Area
  - Total: 2.5 sq mi (6.5 km^{2})
  - Land: 2.5 sq mi (6.5 km^{2})
  - Water: 0 sq mi (0.0 km^{2})
- Elevation: 345 ft (105 m)

Population (2020)
  - Total: 5,262
  - Density: 2,100/sq mi (810/km^{2})
- Time zone: UTC-8 (Pacific (PST))
  - Summer (DST): UTC-7 (PDT)
- ZIP Code: 98366
- Area code(s): 360, 564
- FIPS code: 53-19770
- GNIS feature ID: 2408031

East Port Orchard is a census-designated place (CDP) in Kitsap County, Washington, United States. The population was 5,262 at the 2020 census.

== Geography ==
According to the United States Census Bureau, the CDP has a total area of 2.5 square miles (6.5 km^{2}), all of it land.

== Demographics ==
Historical population
| Census | Pop. | Note | %± |
|---|---|---|---|
| 2000 | 5,116 | | — |
| 2010 | 5,919 | | 15.7% |
| 2020 | 5,262 | | −11.1% |
U.S. Decennial Census; 1970 1980 1990; 2000 2010

East Port Orchard first appeared as a census designated place in the 1980 U.S. census.

=== 2000 census ===
As of the census of 2000, there were 5,116 people, 1,893 households, and 1,385 families residing in the CDP. The population density was 2,043.1 people per square mile (790.1/km^{2}). There were 1,965 housing units at an average density of 784.7/sq mi (303.5/km^{2}). The racial makeup of the CDP was 85.8% White, 1.7% African American, 1.1% Native American, 4.3% Asian, 1.3% Pacific Islander, 1.3% from other races, and 4.4% from two or more races. Hispanic or Latino of any race were 4.6% of the population.

There were 1,893 households, out of which 37.9% had children under the age of 18 living with them, 55.9% were married couples living together, 12.3% had a female householder with no husband present, and 26.8% were non-families. 21.4% of all households were made up of individuals, and 7.4% had someone living alone who was 65 years of age or older. The average household size was 2.70 and the average family size was 3.12.

In the CDP, the population was spread out, with 29.0% under the age of 18, 9.0% from 18 to 24, 29.4% from 25 to 44, 22.4% from 45 to 64, and 10.2% who were 65 years of age or older. The median age was 34 years. For every 100 females, there were 96.4 males. For every 100 females age 18 and over, there were 92.7 males.

The median income for a household in the CDP was $42,571, and the median income for a family was $50,012. Males had a median income of $35,291 versus $27,635 for females. The per capita income for the CDP was $18,834. About 7.1% of families and 9.5% of the population were below the poverty line, including 14.0% of those under the age of 18 and 2.8% of those 65 and older.
