= Parkwood, Washington =

- CDP
- Location of Parkwood, Washington
- Coordinates: 47°31′36″N 122°35′55″W
- Country: United States
- State: Washington
- County: Kitsap

Area
  - Total: 2.7 sq mi (6.9 km^{2})
  - Land: 2.6 sq mi (6.8 km^{2})
  - Water: 0.039 sq mi (0.1 km^{2})
- Elevation: 371 ft (113 m)

Population (2020)
  - Total: 7,635
  - Density: 2,900/sq mi (1,100/km^{2})
- Time zone: UTC-8 (Pacific (PST))
  - Summer (DST): UTC-7 (PDT)
- ZIP Code: 98366
- Area code(s): 360, 564
- FIPS code: 53-53440
- GNIS feature ID: 2409037

Parkwood is a census-designated place (CDP) in Kitsap County, Washington, United States. The population was 7,635 at the 2020 census.

== Geography ==
According to the United States Census Bureau, the CDP has a total area of 2.7 square miles (6.9 km^{2}), of which, 2.6 square miles (6.8 km^{2}) of it is land and 0.04 square miles (0.1 km^{2}) of it (1.50%) is water.

== Demographics ==
Historical population
Census	Pop.	Note	%±
1980	4,599		—
2000	7,213		—
2010	7,126		−1.2%
2020	7,635		7.1%
U.S. Decennial Census; 1970 1980 1990; 2000 2010

East Port Orchard first appeared as a census designated place in the 1980 U.S. census.

=== 2000 census ===
As of the census of 2000, there were 7,213 people, 2,768 households, and 1,915 families residing in the CDP. The population density was 2,743.7 people per square mile (1,058.9/km^{2}). There were 2,893 housing units at an average density of 1,100.4/sq mi (424.7/km^{2}). The racial makeup of the CDP was 84.5% White, 2.5% African American, 1.2% Native American, 4.3% Asian, 1.0% Pacific Islander, 1.5% from other races, and 4.9% from two or more races. Hispanic or Latino of any race were 4.3% of the population.

There were 2,768 households, out of which 36.2% had children under the age of 18 living with them, 53.0% were married couples living together, 11.2% had a female householder with no husband present, and 30.8% were non-families. 24.4% of all households were made up of individuals, and 8.5% had someone living alone who was 65 years of age or older. The average household size was 2.60 and the average family size was 3.09.

In the CDP, the population was spread out, with 28.4% under the age of 18, 9.1% from 18 to 24, 29.1% from 25 to 44, 23.4% from 45 to 64, and 9.9% who were 65 years of age or older. The median age was 34 years. For every 100 females, there were 96.4 males. For every 100 females age 18 and over, there were 92.6 males.

The median income for a household in the CDP was $41,869, and the median income for a family was $48,866. Males had a median income of $36,312 versus $24,127 for females. The per capita income for the CDP was $17,643. About 6.4% of families and 9.1% of the population were below the poverty line, including 10.5% of those under age 18 and 5.0% of those age 65 or over.
