= Southworth, Washington =

- Census-designated place
- Location in Washington and the United States Southworth (the United States)
- Coordinates: 47°30′42″N 122°30′52″W
- Country: United States
- State: Washington
- County: Kitsap

Area
  - Total: 3.39 sq mi (8.77 km^{2})
  - Land: 3.37 sq mi (8.74 km^{2})
  - Water: 0.0077 sq mi (0.02 km^{2})
- Elevation: 712 ft (217 m)

Population (2020)
  - Total: 2,362
  - Density: 650/sq mi (250/km^{2})
- Time zone: UTC-8 (Pacific (PST))
  - Summer (DST): UTC-7 (PDT)
- ZIP code: 98386
- FIPS code: 53-66220
- GNIS feature ID: 2585040

Southworth is an unincorporated community and census-designated place (CDP) on Puget Sound in Kitsap County, Washington, United States. It is best known for being the west end of the Fauntleroy-Vashon Island-Southworth Washington State Ferries run. Landmarks include Southworth Grocery, a US Post Office, ferry terminal, clay cliffs and a private beach on the point. Next to the ferry is a popular place to launch kayaks for trips to nearby Blake Island. As of the 2020 census, Southworth had a population of 2,362.

== Geography ==
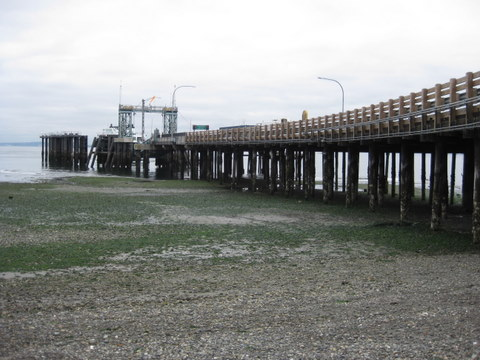
Southworth Ferry Terminal at low tide

Southworth is in southeastern Kitsap County on the shore of Puget Sound, with the CDP limits extending southwest from Point Southworth 0.5 miles (0.80 km) along Colvos Passage and northwest from Point Southworth 2.5 miles (4.0 km) to Yukon Harbor. The CDP includes the communities of Southworth, Harper, and South Colby. Washington State Route 160 is the southern edge of the CDP and leads west 7 miles (11 km) to State Route 16 in the southern outskirts of Port Orchard.

Point Southworth was named by Charles Wilkes, during the Wilkes Expedition of 1838–1842, in honor of Edward Southworth, one of the expedition's quartermasters.

According to the U.S. Census Bureau, the Southworth CDP has a total area of 3.39 square miles (8.77 km^{2}), of which 0.01 square miles (0.02 km^{2}), or 0.28%, are water.

== Demographics ==
Historical population
Census	Pop.	Note	%±
2010	2,185		—
2020	2,362		8.1%
U.S. Decennial Census; 1970 1980 1990; 2000 2010

Southworth first appeared as a census designated place in the 2010 U.S. census.

=== Racial and ethnic composition ===
Southworth CDP, Washington – Racial and ethnic composition Note: the US Census treats Hispanic/Latino as an ethnic category. This table excludes Latinos from the racial categories and assigns them to a separate category. Hispanics/Latinos may be of any race.
Race / Ethnicity (NH = Non-Hispanic)	Pop 2010	Pop 2020	% 2010	% 2020
White alone (NH)	1,946	1,882	89.06%	79.68%
Black or African American alone (NH)	11	17	0.50%	0.72%
Native American or Alaska Native alone (NH)	13	27	0.59%	1.14%
Asian alone (NH)	44	46	2.01%	1.95%
Native Hawaiian or Pacific Islander alone (NH)	6	18	0.27%	0.76%
Other race alone (NH)	3	17	0.14%	0.72%
Mixed race or Multiracial (NH)	78	210	3.57%	8.89%
Hispanic or Latino (any race)	84	145	3.84%	6.14%
Total	2,185	2,362	100.00%	100.00%
