= Erlands Point, Washington =

- Census-designated place
- Location within Washington (state) Location within the United States
- Coordinates: 47°36′14″N 122°41′38″W
- Country: United States
- State: Washington
- County: Kitsap

Area
  - Total: 1.05 sq mi (2.72 km^{2})
  - Land: 0.47 sq mi (1.22 km^{2})
  - Water: 0.58 sq mi (1.50 km^{2})
- Elevation: 43 ft (13 m)

Population (2020)
  - Total: 916
- Time zone: UTC-8 (Pacific (PST))
  - Summer (DST): UTC-7 (PDT)
- ZIP Code: 98312 (Bremerton)
- Area code(s): 360, 564
- FIPS code: 53-22115
- GNIS feature ID: 2805100

Erlands Point is an unincorporated community and census-designated place (CDP) in Kitsap County, Washington, United States. As of the 2020 census, it had a population of 916. Prior to 2020, it was part of the Erlands Point-Kitsap Lake CDP.

Erlands Point is in the center of the county, on a point of land extending into Dyes Inlet from the west. Chico Bay, an arm of Dyes Inlet, borders the point to the north, and Ostrich Bay, another arm, borders the point to the east and south. The CDP is bordered by the city of Bremerton to the south, by the CDP of Kitsap Lake to the southwest, and by Chico to the northwest. To the northeast, across Dyes Inlet, is Tracyton, and to the southeast, across Ostrich Bay, is Rocky Point.

State Route 3 forms the western boundary of the Erlands Point CDP; the highway leads south into the western part of Bremerton and north 12 miles (19 km) to Poulsbo. Downtown Bremerton is 6 miles (10 km) southeast of Erlands Point.

== Demographics ==
Historical population
Census	Pop.	Note	%±
2020	916		—
U.S. Decennial Census

Erlands Point first appeared as a census designated place in the 2020 U.S. census.

=== Racial and ethnic composition ===
Erlands Point CDP, Washington – Racial and ethnic composition Note: the US Census treats Hispanic/Latino as an ethnic category. This table excludes Latinos from the racial categories and assigns them to a separate category. Hispanics/Latinos may be of any race.
Race / Ethnicity (NH = Non-Hispanic)	Pop 2020	2020
White alone (NH)	715	78.06%
Black or African American alone (NH)	15	1.64%
Native American or Alaska Native alone (NH)	15	1.64%
Asian alone (NH)	51	5.57%
Native Hawaiian or Pacific Islander alone (NH)	1	0.11%
Other race alone (NH)	1	0.11%
Mixed race or Multiracial (NH)	61	6.66%
Hispanic or Latino (any race)	57	6.22%
Total	916	100.00%
