= Manette =

Manette may refer to:

People:

- A. Manette Ansay (born 1964), American author, born in Lapeer, Michigan
- Alexandre Manette, character in Charles Dickens' novel, A Tale of Two Cities
- Lucie Manette, character in Charles Dickens' novel, A Tale of Two Cities

Location in Washington, USA:

- Manette, Washington, Washington is a community in Kitsap County, Washington, United States
- Manette Bridge, steel truss bridge that spans the Port Washington Narrows in Bremerton, Washington, USA
- Manette Peninsula, headland that is part of the larger Kitsap Peninsula on the eastern flank of the Olympic Peninsula in western Washington, USA
