= Manette Bridge =

Bridge in Washington, United States

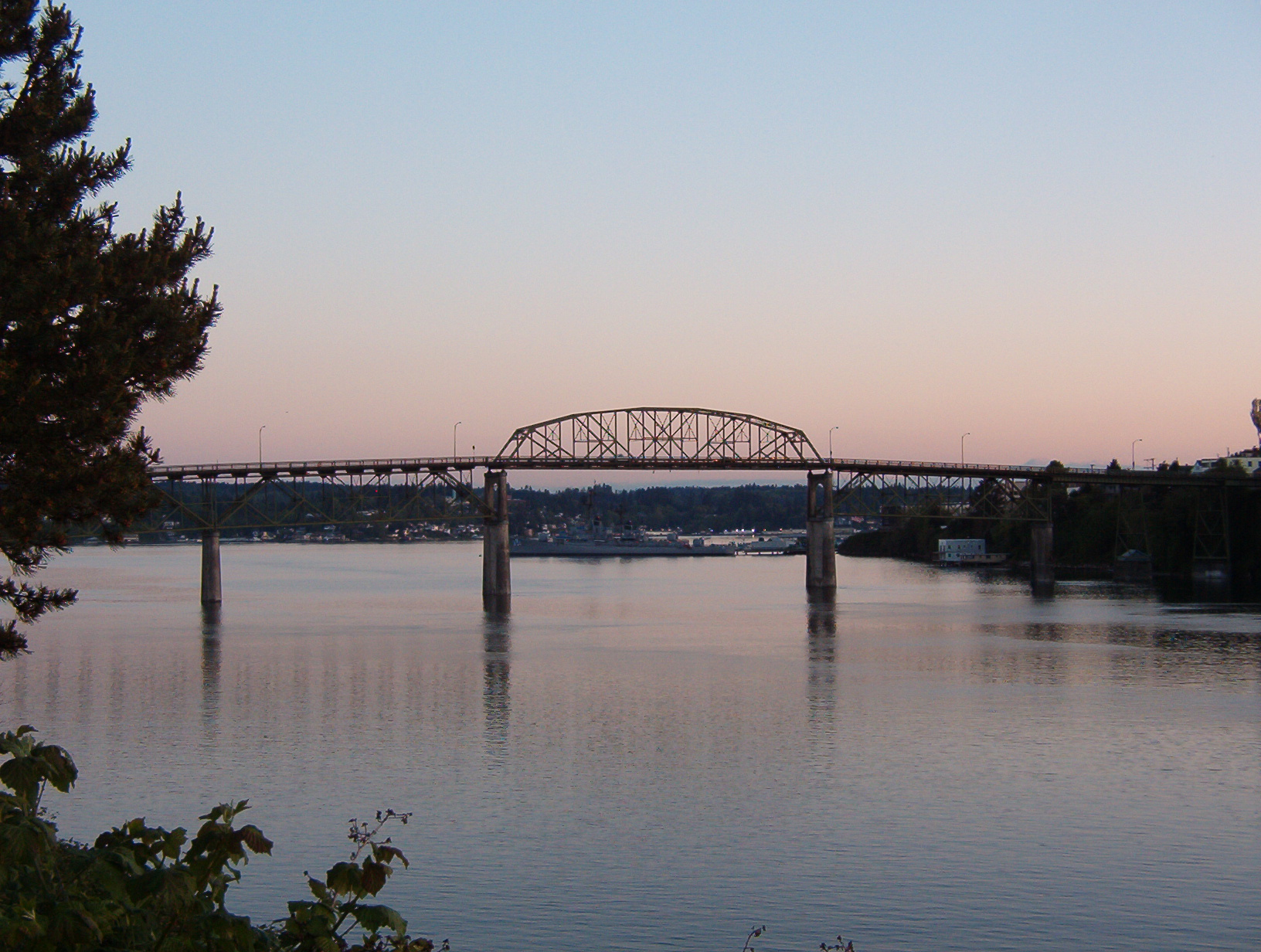
- Coordinates: 47°34′12″N 122°37′14″W
- Crosses: Port Washington Narrows
- Locale: Bremerton, Washington, USA
- Maintained by: Washington Department of Transportation

Characteristics
- Design: truss
- Material: Steel
- Total length: 1,573 feet (479 m)
- Longest span: 321 feet (98 m)
- No. of spans: 6
- Piers in water: 4
- Clearance above: 82 feet (25 m)

History
- Construction start: October 1929
- Opened: June 21, 1930(first bridge); 2011 (current bridge)
- Closed: July 24, 2011

Statistics
- Toll: originally $.25/car, $.05/pedestrian, toll-free since 1972

Location
- Interactive map of Manette Bridge

The Manette Bridge was a steel truss bridge that spanned the Port Washington Narrows in Bremerton, Washington, USA. It connected the community of Manette, Washington to downtown Bremerton. Although it is not part of a numbered state highway, it is one of four bridges specifically designated by state law to be maintained by the Washington Department of Transportation. The bridge was 82 feet (25 m) above the water, and had a horizontal clearance of 321 feet (98 m) between the piers.

The bridge was replaced in 2011, with the new bridge also bearing the name Manette Bridge.

== Ferry crossing ==
Before the bridge was opened in 1930 the trip was made by ferry. Between 1916 and 1930, the Mosquito Fleet ferry Pioneer serviced the crossing between Bremerton and Manette for most of the time. Sometimes the Urania, a passenger-only ferry, filled in. Missing the last ferry meant a long trip around Dyes Inlet through Chico, Silverdale and Tracyton on mostly unimproved roads.

== Bridge history ==
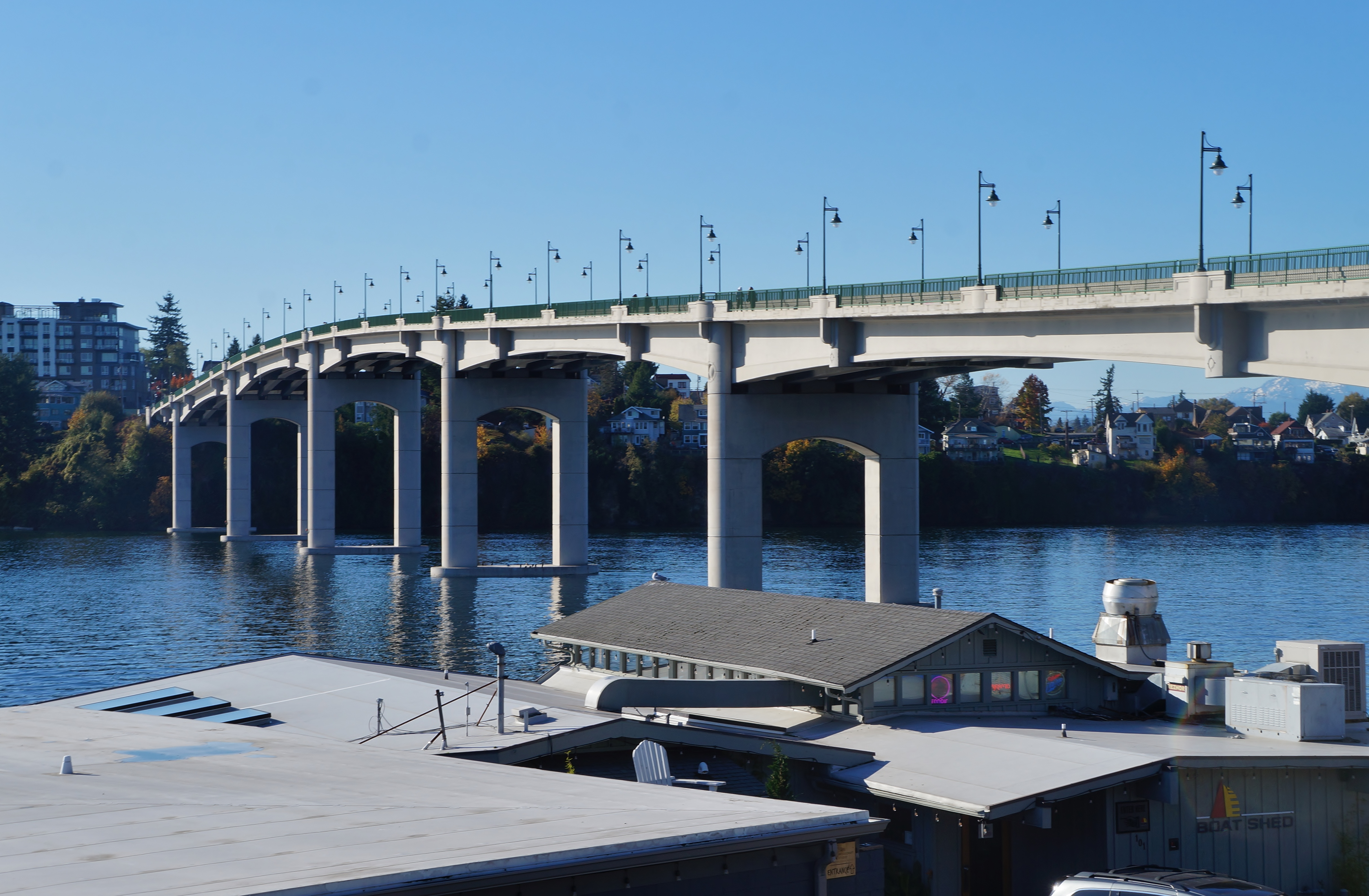
The new Manette Bridge, opened in 2011

The bridge was built as the Bremerton-Manette Bridge, a toll bridge constructed by the East Bremerton Improvement Club to assist families in commuting from the eastside of Bremerton, Washington to the westside. Locals went door to door selling stock, raising approximately $200,000 for the bridge.

Construction on the bridge began October 1929, by the Union Bridge Company of Portland, Oregon. The bridge was 1,573 ft (479 m) long, 80 ft (24 m) high, and 2 lanes. The bridge opened on June 21, 1930, amid much celebration. Among those present was Jane Garrison, the 106-year-old granddaughter of Chief Seattle.

Originally the bridge was a toll bridge, with tolls of 25 cents per car, and 5 cents per pedestrian. The Washington Toll Bridge Authority purchased the bridge in 1937. The tolls generated on the bridge enabled the Washington Toll Bridge Authority to recover the purchase price within a year and a half. The toll was lifted January 28, 1939. The last person to pay a toll on the bridge was J.C Bartholet, at 3:59 pm that day. At 5:30 pm, State Senator Lulu Haddon (D-Bremerton) cut a symbolic ribbon, opening the bridge to toll-free traffic.

In 1949, the timber approaches were replaced with concrete and steel components. The entire timber roadway deck was replaced around the same time. The main span thru truss and deck trusses are from the original 1930s bridge. A wider bridge across the Port Washington Narrows, the Warren Avenue Bridge, was opened in 1958 as an alternative to the Manette Bridge.

The bridge remained toll-free until the nearby Warren Avenue Bridge opened as a toll bridge. Since traffic would use the toll-free Manette Bridge instead, tolls were reinstated from November 25, 1958 to October 24, 1972.

The Manette Bridge, which was first built in 1930, was listed as structurally deficient and functionally obsolete. In early 2010, construction began on a replacement bridge. The new Manette Bridge opened on November 10, 2011.
