= Kitsap Lake =

Lake in Kitsap County, Washington

- Location within Washington (state) Location within the United States
- Location: Kitsap County, Washington
- Coordinates: 47°34′21″N 122°42′16″W
- Primary inflows: Unnamed Tributary
- Primary outflows: Kitsap Creek
- Basin countries: United States
- Surface area: 238 acres (96 ha)
- Max. depth: 143 ft (44 m)
- Surface elevation: 159 ft (48 m)
- Islands: None
- Settlements: Kitsap Lake, Washington, Bremerton, Washington

Kitsap Lake is a lake in Kitsap County, Washington. The lake is near the exact center of the Kitsap Peninsula, roughly between the Dyes Inlet in the Puget Sound and the Blue Hills peak range. It is located on the edge of the Bremerton, Washington city limits.

Kitsap Lake is 238 acres in area. It is shallow, reaching only 27 feet deep at its deepest point.
