= Greg Williamson =

Greg Williamson may refer to:

- Greg Williamson (drummer) (born 1978), Canadian drummer, musician and songwriter
- Greg Williamson (poet) (born 1964), American poet
- Greg Williamson (politician), mayor of North Queensland's Mackay Regional Council
- Greg Williamson (jazz musician), jazz drummer, composer, musician
- Greg Williamson (American football) (born 1964), American football player
