= Clear Creek Trail (Washington) =

Urban trail in Silverdale, Washington, US

Coordinates: 47.651°N 122.685°W

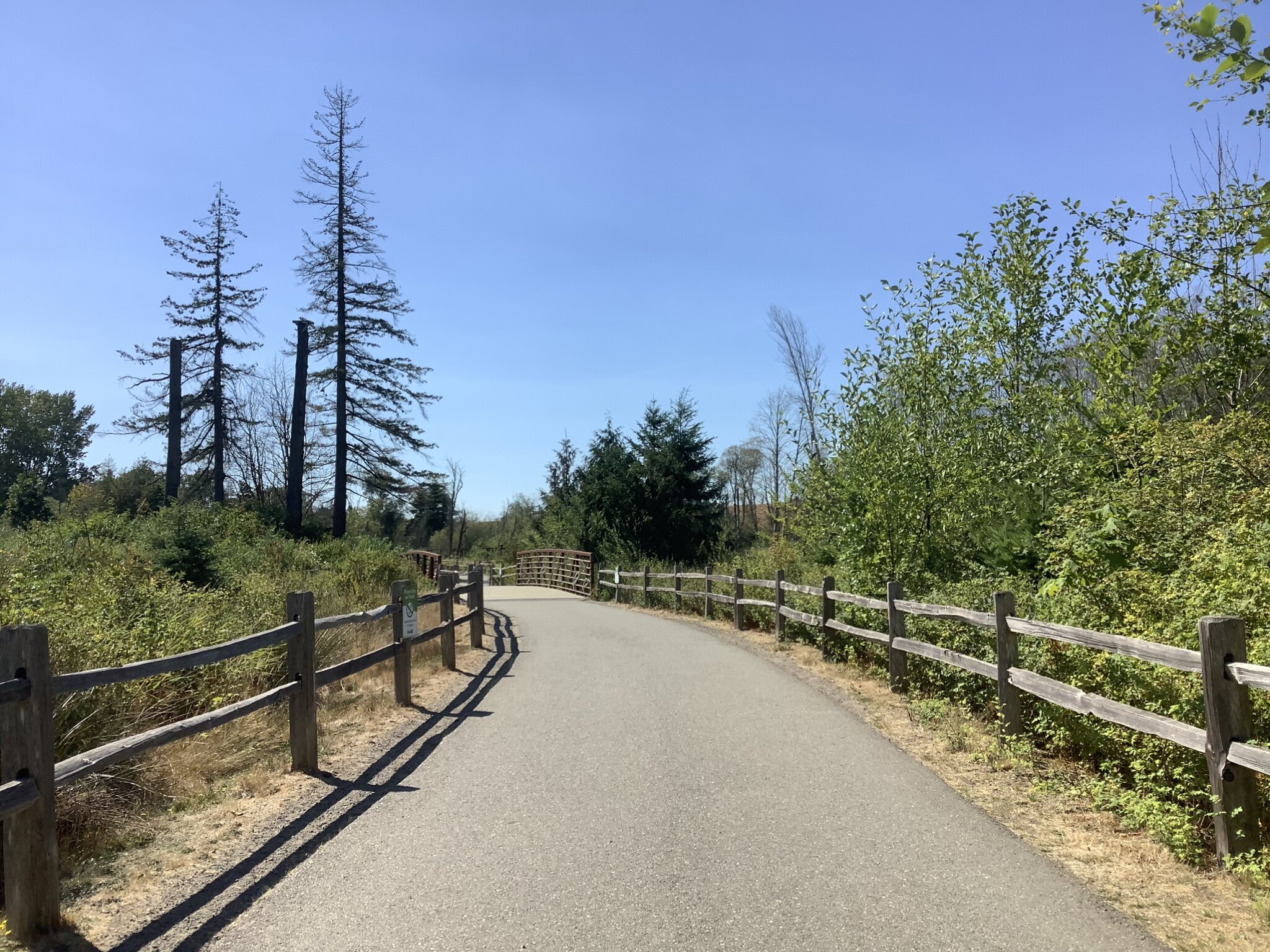
A paved section of Clear Creek Trail near the Silverdale Dog Park trailhead, with a bridge over Clear Creek visible in the background

Clear Creek Trail is an urban trail in Silverdale, Washington, "at once in the suburbs and simultaneously immersed in the natural world". In a 2011 book by Mountaineers Books, it was reported to be over seven miles long. The trail extends along Clear Creek from its uplands near the Naval Base Kitsap-Bangor Trigger Avenue gate on State Route 3 to the creek's estuary at Dyes Inlet.

== History of trail creation ==
The trail was created around 1994 by Kitsap Land Trust and Clear Creek Task Force. In 1997, it was being cleared by volunteers and was two miles long. The trail system was six miles long as of 2011.

In 2011, a guerrilla art project appeared in the trail system: a lifelike giraffe near the trail.

== Awards ==
The trail was selected by Evening Magazine television viewers in 2007 as the "Best hidden Hiking Trail" in Western Washington.
