= Mandetta =

Mandetta is a surname. Notable people with the surname include:

- Luiz Henrique Mandetta (born 1964), Brazilian pediatric orthopedist and politician, member of the Brazil Union
- Therezinha Mandetta Trad (1937–2023), Brazilian educator and the matriarch of the prominent Trad family

== See also ==
- Manetta
- Mondetta
