= Alessandro Manetti =

Alessandro Manetti may refer to:

- Alessandro Manetti (architect) (1787–1865), Italian architect and engineer
- Alessandro Manetti (footballer) (born 1972), Italian football midfielder

== See also ==
- Alessandro
- Manetti
