= Bremerton High School =

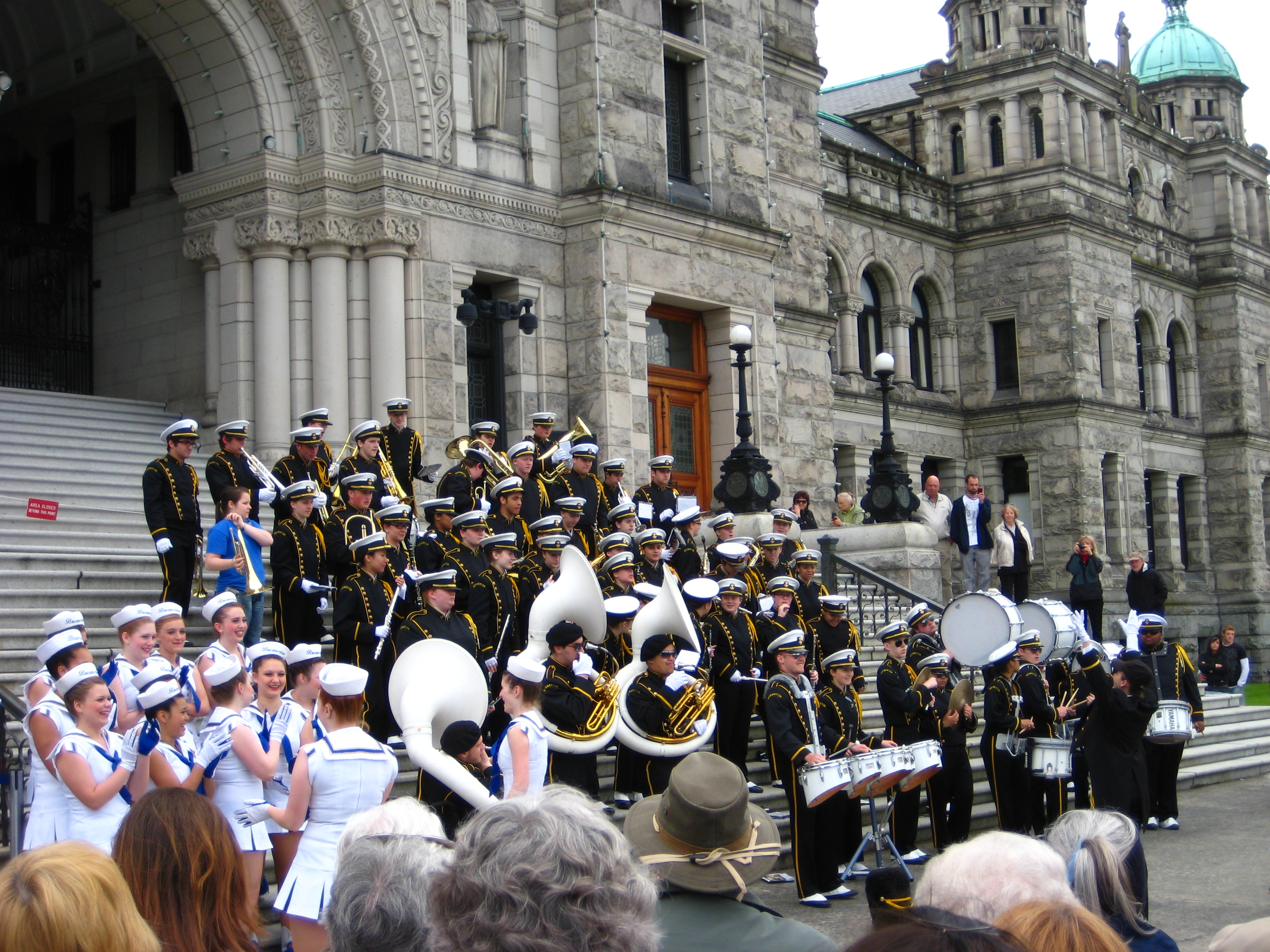

Location
- 1500 13th Street; Bremerton, Kitsap County, Washington 98337; United States; 47.573°N 122.639°W

Information
- Type: Public
- Motto: Respect, Responsibility, and Safety is the Knight way
- Established: 1921; 105 years ago
- School district: Bremerton School District
- NCES School ID: 530066000139
- Principal: Katie Mizak
- Grades: 9–12 since 2008 when the 9th grade wing construction was completed.
- Enrollment: 1,279 (2023-2024)
- Student to teacher ratio: 20.55
- Colors: Royal Blue & Gold
- Mascot: Knight
- Rivals: North Kitsap
- Website: bhs.bremertonschools.org

Bremerton High School is a four-year public secondary school in the port city of Bremerton, Washington, west across Puget Sound from Seattle, in the Bremerton School District. Between 1993 and 2007, Bremerton High School contained grades 10–12 for enrolled students, but starting in the 2008 school year, the school facilitates grades 9–12, where grade 9 was previously contained at Bremerton Junior High School. Several changes in the district's grade configuration have meant freshmen have been in and out of the building.

In 2015, the school came to national attention following the suspension of football coach Joe Kennedy, who would pray at the 50-yard line of the field after varsity games. In 2022, the resulting lawsuit reached the Supreme Court, where it was decided in Kennedy v. Bremerton School District (2022) that Kennedy's First Amendment rights had been violated by the suspension.

== History ==
Bremerton High School has its origins in the Union High School (1905) of Bremerton and Charleston. The first UHS building was built to straddle the boundary line between the two separate cities of Charleston to the west and Bremerton to the east, at High Avenue, between 4th and 5th Streets. That building opened to students on August 29, 1908, with 106 students. The blue and gold Wildcats of Union High School eventually became the Bremerton High School Wildcats in the late 1920s, as the two cities merged and school districts combined.

Over the decades of the 20s, 30s and prior to WWII, the high school building was remodeled and enlarged greatly, with the addition of classrooms, gym and auditorium.

As the population of the city of Bremerton surged during WWII, a larger, more modern high school building was needed. On September 5, 1945, the new BHS building opened at 13th and High, after two years of construction.

The old BHS / UHS campus became Coontz Junior High School, also in September 1945.

In 1956, BHS was split into two separate high schools, West High School (the blue and gold Wildcats, which remained in place) and East High School (the black and white Knights), located across the Port Washington Narrows in East Bremerton, on Wheaton Way.

In 1978, "Bremerton High School" returned when East and West were combined, and its first commencement was held on June 8, 1979. Ronald K. Gillespie, former principal of West High School, was the first principal of the new Bremerton High. For the first few years, BHS occupied the buildings of former East High School. In September 1988, following the completion of a new facility at the original location of Bremerton/West High, the student body was moved back across the water to 1500 13th Street.

== School colors and mascot ==
Bremerton High School's mascot is a Knight carrying The Sword of Justice and The Cape of Truth. The Cape of Truth was handmade by Marialis Jurges and introduced by the Class of 1996. During the Class of 2012 graduation, a second mascot, the Page was introduced. She now accompanies the Knight at all school gatherings. The school's traditional colors are Royal Blue and Gold. The official emblem is a Knight on a horse carrying a lance surrounded by a major arc with "Bremerton High School" written upon it.

The origin of the school colors and mascot comes from the unification of the West High Wildcats, whose colors were blue and gold (from the Union High School days), and the East High Knights, whose colors were black and white (from when EHS opened in September 1956). When the two high schools were combined in September 1978, they chose the colors of West and the mascot of East, giving us Bremerton High School's Knight along with Royal Blue and Gold as its colors. The Bremerton High School yearbook is known as "The Gauntlet."

== Academics ==
Bremerton High School offers the following honors and Advanced Placement classes:

=== Advanced Placement ===
- Language and Composition
- Literature and Composition
- Seminar
- Research
- Biology
- Chemistry
- Environmental Science
- Calculus AB
- Statistics
- Computer Science Principles
- Psychology
- World History
- US History
- US Government and Politics

=== Honors ===
- English 9
- English 10

== Controversies ==
Bremerton High School made national headlines in the spring of 1993 when the school's Associated Student Body (ASB) council narrowly passed a proposed amendment to the student body constitution to ban homosexual students from holding student government positions. By a 49-47 vote, the amendment would bar from office "any student found to be practicing what it called 'immoral activities' like indecent exposure, homosexuality and sexual harassment".

The proposal sparked a national debate, and students were interviewed by local news, ABC's Good Morning America, and the syndicated talk-show Donahue. Principal Marilee Hansen intended to veto the amendment if ratified, but it was ultimately rejected by an overwhelming vote of two-thirds of students against it.

In the fall of 2015, BHS drew national attention over assistant football coach Joe Kennedy and his long practice of taking a knee and praying at the 50-yard line after varsity and JV games. Bremerton School District superintendent Aaron Leavell declared in September that Kennedy was in violation of federal court rulings and school district policy. Initially, Kennedy followed Leavell's order, but in October, after acquiring legal advice and defense from the First Liberty Institute, he resumed his post-game prayer. Kennedy was put on paid leave on October 29, 2015, as per the school district statement.

Kennedy was the plaintiff in the U.S. Supreme Court case Kennedy v. Bremerton School District, in which the Court ruled 6-3 in Kennedy's favor, affirming that the Establishment Clause of the U.S. Constitution does not mandate nor allow the school to suppress an individual's personal religious observance.

The story and court case were dramatized in the 2024 film Average Joe, though Bremerton High School and the Bremerton School District were not named in the film.

== Notable alumni ==
- Nathan Adrian (2006) — Olympic swimmer, 2008 gold medalist, 2012 gold medalist in the 100-meter freestyle and 4x100-meter medley relay and silver medalist in the 4x100-meter freestyle relay, 2016 2x gold and 2x bronze medalist, making him the 10th most decorated Olympic swimmer
- George Bayer (1943) — PGA Tour player
- Tony Boddie (1978) — NFL running back
- Norm Dicks (1959) — U.S. congressman (1977–2013)
- Bill Gates Sr. (1943) — attorney and father of Microsoft co-founder Bill Gates
- Don Heinrich (1948) — NFL quarterback and coach
- Dana Kirk (2002) — Olympic swimmer
- Tara Kirk (2000) — Olympic swimmer
- Joe Pichler (2005) — child actor
- Kevin Sargent (1987) — NFL offensive tackle
- Ted Tappe (1949) — MLB outfielder
- Gale Wade (1947) — MLB outfielder
- Marvin Williams (2004) — NBA forward
- Greg Williamson — jazz drummer, composer, and professor
- Arthur Bernard Langlie (July 25, 1900 – July 24, 1966) — American politician, mayor of Seattle, Washington, 12th and 14th governor of the U.S. state of Washington
- Linda Hoxit (1971) - Broadway Dancer/Singer
