= Sinclair Inlet =

Embayment in Puget Sound, Washington, U.S.

Coordinates: 47°32′48″N 122°39′02″W

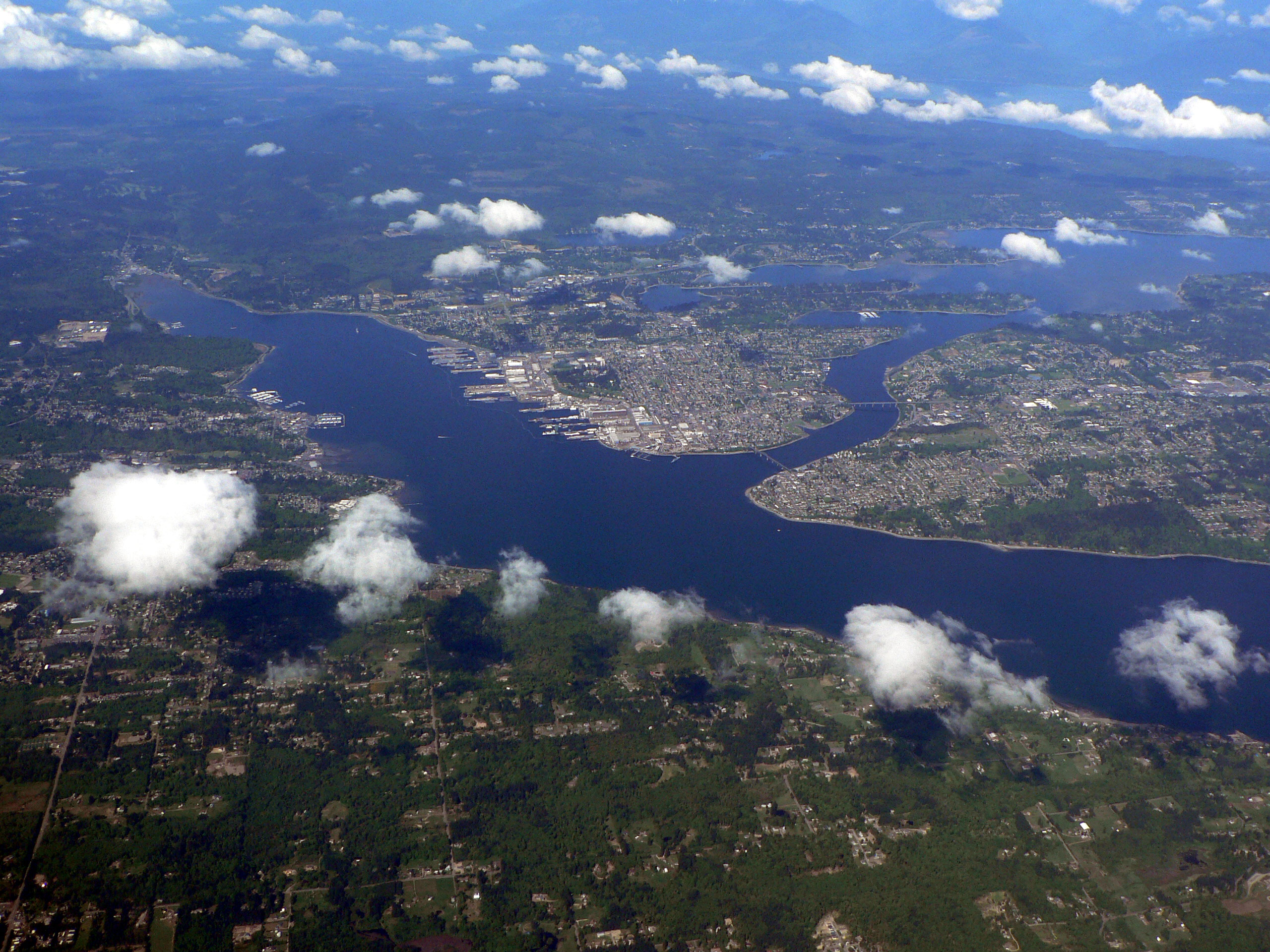
Sinclair Inlet (left), Dyes Inlet (upper right) and Manette and Warren Avenue Bridges across Port Washington Narrows (right center)

Sinclair Inlet is a shallow embayment in the western part of Puget Sound in Kitsap County, Washington, USA. It has a maximum depth of 20 meters. It is the southwestern extension of Port Orchard, and it touches the shores of three of Kitsap County's four incorporated cities: Bremerton, Bainbridge Island, and Port Orchard. It is connected to Dyes Inlet by the Port Washington Narrows and to Puget Sound by Rich Passage. It was named by United States Navy explorer Charles Wilkes for George T. Sinclair, acting master of one of his ship's crews. The Puget Sound Naval Shipyard is located on the north shore of Sinclair Inlet.

== Ecology ==
Over 20 streams of various sizes drain into Sinclair Inlet, the largest being the Gorst, Blackjack, Anderson, and Wright Creeks. The embayment is triangular, about 1.9 km across and 6.4 km long. It is a tidally dominated, non-stratified, saline body, due to a low inflow of freshwater.

Gorst Creek and Blackjack Creek, both spawning grounds for Chinook salmon, are tributaries to Sinclair Inlet. In 2002, over 17,000 Chinook salmon escaped into the inlet, along with another 10,000 adult salmon into Gorst Creek. Other species of salmon, such as coho and chum, have also been found in Sinclair Inlet and its surrounding streams.

== Environmental issues ==
Sinclair Inlet has been significantly modified by human encroachment. Shallow water habits have been altered or lost, riparian vegetation along the shoreline has decreased, and both sediment and water quality have declined.

In the 1980s, the sediment of Sinclair Inlet was found to have elevated concentrations of organic compounds. A remedial investigation of the waters around the naval complex at Bremerton took place in 1996. The goal of the sediment clean-up was mainly to reduce the risk for humans of consuming bottom-dwelling fish with elevated levels of polychlorinated biphenyls (PCB) in their tissues.

Sinclair Inlet has been the site for mercury remediation, as years of the naval shipyard's activities have degraded the area. Peak concentrations of mercury, according to dated sediment cores from the inlet, occurred around World War II. The contamination decreased following WWII due to better metallurgical management practices and increased environmental regulations. However, the concentrations of mercury have decreased slowly because the sedimentation rate is relatively slow. From 2000 to 2001, remedial dredging attempted to decontaminate the site, and indicators suggest this had a significant positive effect on the inlet as a whole. Still, total mercury concentrations in unfiltered water from the Sinclair Inlet were roughly three times higher than those of central Puget Sound.

In January 2017, the Suquamish Tribe, along with the Puget Soundkeeper and the Washington Environmental Council issued a notice of intent to sue the U.S. Navy for violations of the Clean Water Act, as a consequence of scraping the hull of an aircraft carrier, the USS Independence (CV-62), inside Sinclair Inlet, without an appropriate discharge permit from the United States Environmental Protection Agency. The tribe estimated that 730 cubic yards of material were removed during the hull-scraping. In January 2020, the Navy reached a resolution with the tribe, agreeing to pump a layer of sand at least 10 centimeters thick into the area where the Independence was harbored. The agreement also contained a provision for a 10-year moratorium of hull-scapings, because of the harmful pollutants scraped into the inlet, including copper and zinc. The agreement is particularly pertinent given plans to scrape the hull of the USS Kitty Hawk.
