= Glenn Jarstad =

American businessman and politician

- Born: December 7, 1921; Bremerton, Washington, United States
- Died: January 27, 2002 (aged 80)
- Occupations: Fishing guide, Grocer
- Known for: Mayor of Bremerton, Washington

Glenn Jarstad (December 7, 1921—January 27, 2002) was an American businessman and politician who served as mayor of Bremerton, Washington.

Jarstad was born in Bremerton and attended Kitsap High School, before studying at Washington State University on a football scholarship. He enlisted in the United States Army in 1944 and, following overseas service in Europe during World War II, took over management of his father-in-law's Bremerton grocery store. He was first elected mayor in 1964 and served until 1981. During part of his time as mayor, Jarstad served as president of the 38-city Puget Sound Council of Governments; he was known to be a strong supporter of the significant U.S. Navy presence in Kitsap County. In retirement, he worked as a fishing guide, chartering for — among others — local politicians including Warren Magnuson, Henry M. Jackson, and Norm Dicks, and eventually returned to politics, winning election to the Bremerton city council.

Jarstad Park in Gorst, Washington is named after Jarstad's father, Otto, while the city's Jarstad Aquatic Center is named after Glenn Jarstad. In 2011, Jarstad's widow joined a descendant of Chief Seattle for the ceremonial opening of the new Manette Bridge, in observance of the fact that Jarstad crossed the first bridge on the date of its grand opening in 1930.
