= Manetta =

Manetta is a surname and given name. Notable people with this name include:

Surname:

- Manuel Manetta, "Fess" Manetta (1889–1969), American jazz multi-instrumentalist
- Manuela Manetta (born 1983), professional squash player who represented Italy
- Marco Manetta (born 1991), Italian professional footballer

Given name:

- Manetta Darnall or Linda Darnell (1923–1965), American actress

== See also ==
- Edgemoor and Manetta Railway, South Carolina shortline railroad
- Manette (disambiguation)
- Manetti
