= Manette Peninsula =

Headland in Washington, U.S.

Coordinates: 47°38′N 122°38′W

The Manette Peninsula is a headland that is part of the larger Kitsap Peninsula, located on the eastern flank of the Kitsap Peninsula, in western Washington, United States.

== Geography ==
The Manette Peninsula is bounded on the west by Port Washington Narrows and Dyes Inlet, on the east by Port Orchard Bay, and on the north by Dogfish Bay. It is connected by land to the greater Kitsap Peninsula along its northwestern quadrant, between the northern tip of Dyes Inlet and the northwestern edge of Dogfish Bay, approximately through the Clear Creek Valley.

The bodies of water that surround the Manette Peninsula are all part of the Puget Sound complex of inland sea waterways.

== Geology ==
The region is geologically active. The Manette Peninsula is part of the Puget Sound Lowlands; the lands formed of accumulated sediments from glaciers during the pleistocene epoch and deposited into the Puget Trough, which is the subduction trough where the Juan de Fuca Plate sinks below the American Continental Plate. This continental drift continues to bring the Olympic Peninsula eastward, toward the previously docked North Cascades micro-continent, upon the Okanagan micro-continent before it.

== People ==
=== Archeological record ===
Archeological evidence found on the Manette Peninsula suggests at least two, distinct periods of human settlement prior to the historic record. The first possibly beginning 7000 years ago. The people living on the Manette Peninsula at the beginning of the historic record were the Saktabsh band of the Suquamish. The Indian Fort at Point Herron was used to defend the entry to the Port Washington Narrows from annual raids by northern coastal tribes from the areas now in Canada and Alaska (see also Haida). A permanent village near Erlands Point had a longhouse similar to the remaining longhouse near Agate Passage, Old Man House.

=== Historical record ===
The first permanent settlement of the westward expansion on the Manette Peninsula was a company town at a saw mill and dock built on a land claim staked out by William Renton on March 26, 1854 at Enetai Point. In 1857 Slaughter County was established in the area that is now Kitsap County, which includes the Manette Peninsula. Renton and his partner, Daniel S. Howard operated the milling and shipping company until Howard's death, at about the same time as the land deed was granted in 1863. Renton sold the land and business and moved to a larger mill facility at Blakely Harbor on Bainbridge Island.

In 1868 the first Post Office was established at the sawmill, then the Colman and Glidden Mill of Port Orchard. (The city of Port Orchard now is on the opposite side of Port Orchard bay, to the south, on the Kitsap mainland.) The Coleman and Glidden Mill Company filed for bankruptcy in 1869. Then a company ship was hijacked to Victoria, British Columbia, and a federal judge's wife was thrown overboard to quiet her shrieking protestations. A logger threw the ship's captain overboard. An explosion occurred at the mill. A watchdog was poisoned. On May 8, 1870 the mill burned to the ground. A week later the sheriff seized the remaining assets for taxes owed.

Other settlements around the Manette Peninsula built ports of call for the maritime transportation network of the Puget Sound's Mosquito Fleet. On the opposite side of Point Herron from the sawmill's shipping dock at Enetai, a dock at Decatur (later the town of Manette) served ferries to Bremerton. Docks and small ships provided transportation links among the shoreline communities before overland routes were cleared, and to communities on opposite shores.

== Present features ==
=== Transportation ===
The Manette Bridge and Warren Avenue Bridge provide transportation links, across Port Washington Narrows, and between downtown Bremerton and East Bremerton. The neighborhoods within the city of Bremerton which are located on the southern tip of the Manette Peninsula are referred to either by the names of the historical villages the city has overtaken, including the historical settlements of Manette and Enetai, or collectively as East Bremerton. The existing towns outside of the city of Bremerton on the Manette Peninsula include Illahee, Tracyton, and Brownsville.

=== Freshwater features ===
The primary source for municipal water is groundwater pumped from a deep aquifer, part of the Puget-Willamette Trough regional aquifer system. Above the drinking water aquifer, a shallow water table produces numerous springs and seeps at surface level.

=== Recreation ===
Illahee State Park is a prominent recreation area located on the eastern shore of the Manette Peninsula.

== See also ==
- Kitsap Peninsula
- Geology of the Pacific Northwest
