= Kitsap Lake, Washington =

- Census-designated place
- Location within Washington (state) Location within the United States
- Coordinates: 47°35′25″N 122°42′32″W
- Country: United States
- State: Washington
- County: Kitsap

Area
  - Total: 1.16 sq mi (3.00 km^{2})
  - Land: 1.16 sq mi (3.00 km^{2})
  - Water: 0 sq mi (0.0 km^{2})
- Elevation: 62 ft (19 m)

Population (2020)
  - Total: 1,997
- Time zone: UTC-8 (Pacific (PST))
  - Summer (DST): UTC-7 (PDT)
- ZIP Code: 98312 (Bremerton)
- Area code(s): 360, 564
- FIPS code: 53-36010
- GNIS feature ID: 2805101

Kitsap Lake is an unincorporated community and census-designated place (CDP) in Kitsap County, Washington, United States. As of the 2020 census, it had a population of 1,997. Prior to 2020, it was part of the Erlands Point-Kitsap Lake CDP.

The Kitsap Lake CDP is in the center of the county, bordered to the south and east by the city of Bremerton, to the northeast by Erlands Point, and to the north by Chico. The CDP is in the valley of Kitsap Creek, north of (downstream from) Kitsap Lake, a water body that is within the Bremerton city limits. Downtown Bremerton is 6 miles (10 km) east-southeast of the Kitsap Lake CDP.

== Demographics ==
Historical population
Census	Pop.	Note	%±
2020	1,997		—
U.S. Decennial Census

Kitsap Lake first appeared as a census designated place in the 2020 U.S. census.

=== Racial and ethnic composition ===
Kitsap Lake CDP, Washington – Racial and ethnic composition Note: the US Census treats Hispanic/Latino as an ethnic category. This table excludes Latinos from the racial categories and assigns them to a separate category. Hispanics/Latinos may be of any race.
Race / Ethnicity (NH = Non-Hispanic)	Pop 2020	2020
White alone (NH)	1,369	68.55%
Black or African American alone (NH)	45	2.25%
Native American or Alaska Native alone (NH)	25	1.25%
Asian alone (NH)	61	3.05%
Native Hawaiian or Pacific Islander alone (NH)	22	1.10%
Other race alone (NH)	17	0.85%
Mixed race or Multiracial (NH)	190	9.51%
Hispanic or Latino (any race)	268	13.42%
Total	1,997	100.00%

=== 2020 census ===
As of the 2020 census, Kitsap Lake had a population of 1,997. The median age was 37.5 years. 19.1% of residents were under the age of 18 and 16.3% of residents were 65 years of age or older. For every 100 females there were 104.2 males, and for every 100 females age 18 and over there were 101.2 males age 18 and over.

100.0% of residents lived in urban areas, while 0.0% lived in rural areas.

There were 855 households in Kitsap Lake, of which 23.3% had children under the age of 18 living in them. Of all households, 43.0% were married-couple households, 26.5% were households with a male householder and no spouse or partner present, and 22.2% were households with a female householder and no spouse or partner present. About 30.8% of all households were made up of individuals and 11.2% had someone living alone who was 65 years of age or older.

There were 890 housing units, of which 3.9% were vacant. The homeowner vacancy rate was 1.3% and the rental vacancy rate was 4.2%.
