= Kevin Sargent (American football) =

American football player (born 1969)

No. 77
- Position: Offensive tackle

Personal information
- Born: March 31, 1969 (age 57); Bremerton, Washington, U.S.
- Listed height: 6 ft 6 in (1.98 m)
- Listed weight: 289 lb (131 kg)

Career information
- High school: Bremerton
- College: Eastern Washington
- NFL draft: 1992: undrafted

Career history
- Cincinnati Bengals (1992–1998)

Career NFL statistics
- Games played: 73
- Games started: 63
- Fumble recoveries: 3
- Stats at Pro Football Reference

Kevin Sargent (born March 31, 1969) is an American former professional football player who was an offensive tackle in the National Football League (NFL). He was signed by the Cincinnati Bengals as an undrafted free agent in 1992. He played college football for the Eastern Washington Eagles.

== High school and college career ==
Sargent attended Bremerton High School in Bremerton, Washington, where he played football, basketball, and baseball. He weighed 205 pounds when he graduated and only received interest from Eastern Washington to play college football.

Sargent redshirted his first year at Eastern Washington University before starting 43 consecutive games. He was considered one of the best offensive tackles in NCAA Division I-AA.

== Professional career ==
After going undrafted in the 1992 NFL draft due to a perceived lack of strength, Sargent signed a free agent contract with the Cincinnati Bengals. He started eight games at left tackle as a rookie in place of an injured Anthony Muñoz, whom Sargent credits for mentoring him. Sargent was named the starting left tackle ahead of the 1993 season, but broke his arm in the season opener against the Cleveland Browns, which required two surgeries. He was medically cleared to begin practicing in time for the following season's training camp.

Sargent returned from injury in 1994 and started the season as Cincinnati's starting right tackle in place of an injured Joe Walter. He was moved back to left tackle in 1995. Sargent underwent ankle surgery after the season. Furthermore, he underwent neck surgery that August to repair a herniated disk, forcing him to miss the entire 1996 season. Regardless, in early 1997, Sargent re-signed with the Bengals on a two-year, $975,000 deal. He made his return on November 2, 1997, replacing Rod Jones as the starting left tackle and helping the Bengals rush for 174 yards against the San Diego Chargers. Sargent started the last eight games of the season, helping them to a 6–2 record.

Ahead of the 1998 season, Sargent signed a four-year, $12 million contract with a $3.5 million signing bonus, making him the highest-paid offensive lineman in Bengals history. He started all 16 games that year, but was forced to retire during the 1999 preseason due to numbness and tingling in his hands, arms, and back.
