= Bay Vista, Washington =

- Unincorporated community
- Location in Washington and the United States Bay Vista (the United States)
- Coordinates: 47°33′52″N 122°40′35″W
- Country: United States
- State: Washington
- County: Kitsap
- Time zone: UTC-8 (Pacific (PST))
  - Summer (DST): UTC-7 (PDT)
- ZIP code: 98312
- Area code: 360
- Website: https://www.bremertonwa.gov/370/Bay-Vista

Bay Vista is a community located in Bremerton, in Kitsap County, Washington. It borders Navy Yard City.
