= Erlands Point-Kitsap Lake, Washington =

- Former CDP
- Location of Erlands Point-Kitsap Lake, Washington
- Coordinates: 47°35′50″N 122°42′08″W
- Country: United States
- State: Washington
- County: Kitsap

Area
  - Total: 2.4 sq mi (6.1 km^{2})
  - Land: 1.8 sq mi (4.6 km^{2})
  - Water: 0.54 sq mi (1.4 km^{2})
- Elevation: 43 ft (13 m)

Population (2010)
  - Total: 2,935
  - Density: 1,700/sq mi (640/km^{2})
- Time zone: UTC-8 (Pacific (PST))
  - Summer (DST): UTC-7 (PDT)
- FIPS code: 53-22118
- GNIS feature ID: 2408087

Erlands Point-Kitsap Lake is an unincorporated area and former census-designated place (CDP) in Kitsap County, Washington, United States. The population was 2,935 at the 2010 census. For the 2020 census, the area was split into two CDPs, Erlands Point and Kitsap Lake.

Based on per capita income, one of the more reliable measures of affluence, Erlands Point-Kitsap Lake ranks 84th of 522 areas in the state of Washington to be ranked.

== Geography ==
According to the United States Census Bureau, the CDP has a total area of 2.3 square miles (6.1 km^{2}), of which, 1.8 square miles (4.6 km^{2}) of it is land and 0.6 square miles (1.5 km^{2}) of it (23.93%) is water.

== Demographics ==
As of the census of 2000, there were 2,723 people, 1,141 households, and 765 families residing in the CDP. The population density was 1,531.9 people per square mile (590.6/km^{2}). There were 1,250 housing units at an average density of 703.2/sq mi (271.1/km^{2}). The racial makeup of the CDP was 89.4% White, 2.1% African American, 1.3% Native American, 2.2% Asian, 0.6% Pacific Islander, 0.9% from other races, and 3.5% from two or more races. Hispanic or Latino of any race were 3.5% of the population.

There were 1,141 households, out of which 29.1% had children under the age of 18 living with them, 51.1% were married couples living together, 9.9% had a female householder with no husband present, and 32.9% were non-families. 25.2% of all households were made up of individuals, and 8.9% had someone living alone who was 65 years of age or older. The average household size was 2.39 and the average family size was 2.82.

In the CDP, the population was spread out, with 23.1% under the age of 18, 7.9% from 18 to 24, 30.6% from 25 to 44, 24.0% from 45 to 64, and 14.4% who were 65 years of age or older. The median age was 39 years. For every 100 females, there were 106.4 males. For every 100 females age 18 and over, there were 106.2 males.

The median income for a household in the CDP was $45,947, and the median income for a family was $54,423. Males had a median income of $40,129 versus $29,773 for females. The per capita income for the CDP was $25,377. About 5.2% of families and 5.7% of the population were below the poverty line, including 4.6% of those under age 18 and 1.6% of those age 65 or over.
