= USS Bremerton =

Two ships of the United States Navy have been named Bremerton, after the city of Bremerton, Washington.

- USS Bremerton (CA-130), was a heavy cruiser in use from 1945 to 1960.
- USS Bremerton (SSN-698), was a Los Angeles–class nuclear attack submarine in commission from 1981 to 2021.
