= Chico, Washington =

Unincorporated community in Washington, United States

- Census-designated place
- Location in Washington and the United States Chico (the United States)
- Coordinates: 47°37′32″N 122°43′10″W
- Country: United States
- State: Washington
- County: Kitsap

Area
  - Total: 2.29 sq mi (5.93 km^{2})
  - Land: 2.29 sq mi (5.93 km^{2})
  - Water: 0 sq mi (0.0 km^{2})
- Elevation: 436 ft (133 m)

Population (2020)
  - Total: 2,723
  - Density: 1,190/sq mi (459/km^{2})
- Time zone: UTC-8 (Pacific (PST))
  - Summer (DST): UTC-7 (PDT)
- ZIP Code: 98312
- Area code(s): 360, 564
- FIPS code: 53-12175
- GNIS feature ID: 2584958

Chico is an unincorporated community and census-designated place (CDP) in Kitsap County, Washington, United States. Named in 1889 for a Suquamish head chief, Chico is located on the Dyes Inlet waterfront, south of Silverdale. At the 2020 census the community had a population of 2,723.

== Geography ==
Chico is in central Kitsap County, bordered to the north by Silverdale and to the south by the Erlands Point and Kitsap Lake CDPs. It is bordered to the east by Dyes Inlet, a tidal water body that connects to Puget Sound via Port Washington Narrows through Bremerton, then via the strait of Port Orchard. It is bordered to the west by Camp Wesley Harris and Newberry Hill Heritage Park. The northern border is Newberry Hill Road, which separates Chico from Silverdale. Chico Creek forms the southern boundary with Erlands Point and Kitsap Lake to the south. Washington State Route 3 runs through the community, leading north 19 miles (31 km) to Port Gamble and south 4 miles (6 km) to the western side of Bremerton.

According to the U.S. Census Bureau, the Chico CDP has an area of 2.3 square miles (5.9 km^{2}), all of it land.

== Demographics ==
Historical population
Census	Pop.	Note	%±
2010	2,259		—
2020	2,723		20.5%
U.S. Decennial Census; 2000 2010 2020

Chico first appeared as a census designated place in the 2010 U.S. census.

=== Racial and ethnic composition ===
Chico CDP, Washington – Racial and ethnic composition Note: the US Census treats Hispanic/Latino as an ethnic category. This table excludes Latinos from the racial categories and assigns them to a separate category. Hispanics/Latinos may be of any race.
Race / Ethnicity (NH = Non-Hispanic)	Pop 2010	Pop 2020	% 2010	% 2020
White alone (NH)	1,786	1,975	79.06%	72.53%
Black or African American alone (NH)	65	71	2.88%	2.61%
Native American or Alaska Native alone (NH)	8	6	0.35%	0.22%
Asian alone (NH)	179	196	7.92%	7.20%
Native Hawaiian or Pacific Islander alone (NH)	23	27	1.02%	0.99%
Other race alone (NH)	4	20	0.18%	0.73%
Mixed race or Multiracial (NH)	84	236	3.72%	8.67%
Hispanic or Latino (any race)	110	192	4.87%	7.05%
Total	2,259	2,723	100.00%	100.00%
