= Washington State Toll Bridge Authority =

State agency of Washington

The Washington State Toll Bridge Authority was created in 1937 by the Washington State Legislature, with a mandate to finance, construct and operate toll bridges in the state of Washington.

The first act of the Toll Bridge Authority was to purchase the Manette Bridge, previously a privately owned toll bridge; it was made a toll-free crossing in January 1939. The agency then constructed several new bridges in the Puget Sound region that were intended to become toll-free crossings once their construction bonds had been retired. These included the Lake Washington Floating Bridge, which was tolled from 1940 to 1943; and the original Tacoma Narrows Bridge, which opened in July 1940 and collapsed on November 7 during a windstorm.

The Toll Bridge Authority began operating public ferries on June 1, 1951, when Washington State Ferries was created to take over the private Black Ball Line routes. The agency was dissolved in 1977 and absorbed into the new Washington State Department of Transportation, which also took over the duties of the Department of Highways.
