= Bremerton School District =

School district in Bremerton, Washington

Bremerton School District No. 100 is a public school district in Kitsap County, Washington, USA and serves the city of Bremerton.

As of April 28, 2021, the district has an enrollment of 4,554 students.

== Schools ==
=== High schools ===
- Bremerton High School

=== Middle schools ===
- Mountain View Middle School
- West Hills S.T.E.M. Academy

=== Primary schools ===
- Armin Jahr Elementary School
- Crownhill Elementary School
- Kitsap Lake Elementary School
- Naval Avenue Early Learning Center
- View Ridge Elementary School
- West Hills S.T.E.M. Academy

=== Other schools ===
- West Sound Technical Skills Center
- Alliance Academy
- Renaissance School

== Supreme Court Case — Kennedy v. Bremerton ==
In 2015, Joseph Kennedy served as assistant football coach at Bremerton High School, where his children attended as students. His wife was the district's director of human resources. In 2007, he swore an oath that he would kneel at the 50-yard line to pray after each game, and he maintained this practice up until October 2015. In his prayers, Kennedy sought to express gratitude for "what the players had accomplished and for the opportunity to be part of their lives through the game of football." Kennedy offered his prayers after the players and coaches had shaken hands, by taking a knee at the 50-yard line and praying "quiet[ly]" for "approximately 30 seconds." For over seven years, no one complained to the district about these practices.

The district's superintendent began official correspondence with Kennedy on September 17, 2015, admonishing Kennedy to abstain from any outwardly visible behaviors that a reasonable person could interpret as religious expression. Further correspondence on October 23 made clear that the only option it would offer Kennedy was to allow him to pray after a game in a "private location" behind closed doors and "not observable to students or the public." After the game on October 26, Kennedy "knelt alone to offer a brief prayer as the players engaged in postgame traditions."

Shortly thereafter, the district placed Kennedy on paid administrative leave and prohibited him from "participat[ing], in any capacity, in . . . football program activities." While Mr. Kennedy received "uniformly positive evaluations" every other year of his coaching career, after the 2015 season ended in November, the district gave him a poor performance evaluation. The evaluation advised against rehiring Kennedy on the grounds that he "failed to follow district policy" regarding religious expression and "failed to supervise student-athletes after games."

Kennedy sued the district in federal court, alleging that the district's actions violated the First Amendment’s Free Speech and Free Exercise Clauses. He also moved for a preliminary injunction requiring the district to reinstate him. The court denied these initial motions on the basis that the district's actions were necessary to avoid violating the Constitution's Establishment Clause. Consequently, the case would have significant implications for freedom of expression in the United States.

Kennedy appealed the judgment, and the case eventually proceeded to the Supreme Court of the United States, which considered arguments in April 2022 and released its ruling in June 2022. The Court ruled in Kennedy's favor, reversing the lower courts' decisions and holding that "The Constitution neither mandates nor permits the government to suppress such religious expression. The district acted on a mistaken view that it has a duty to suppress religious observances even as it allows comparable secular speech," and that "A rule that the only acceptable government role models for students are those who eschew any visible religious expression would undermine a long constitutional tradition of tolerating diverse expressive activities." Following the Court's judgment, Kennedy has indicated his intent to return to coaching football at Bremerton High School.
