= Manette, Washington =

Community in Washington, US

Coordinates: 47°34′16″N 122°36′44″W

Manette, Washington is a community in Kitsap County, Washington, United States. It was established as a town on April 20, 1891, but was later made part of Bremerton, Washington. Manette is located on Point Herron, commonly known as the Manette Peninsula, in the body of water known as Port Orchard, part of Puget Sound.
