= Greg Williamson (jazz musician) =

American jazz musician

- Born: 1965 (age 60–61); Washington, U.S.
- Genres: Jazz
- Instruments: Drums
- Education: Central Washington University (BM); Western Washington University (MM)

Greg Williamson (born January 1965) is an American jazz musician and composer of jazz music.

== Early life and education ==
Williamson was born and raised in Western Washington. After graduating from Bremerton High School, he earned a Bachelor of Music from Central Washington University and a Master of Music from Western Washington University.

== Career ==
Williamson has performed as a member of the big bands Woody Herman, The Glenn Miller Orchestra, and the Harry James Orchestra. As part of Steve Allen's re-work of the Tonight Show, Williamson went on tour with performers including Joe Williams, Rosemary Clooney, Paul Smith, Louis Nye and Bill "Jose Jimenez" Dana. In the 1990s, Williamson performed with Don Rickles, Bob Newhart, and Joan Rivers; he regularly played the drums for Grammy-nominated jazz vocalist Ernestine Anderson and eventually became her musical director. He has also leads a quartet which performed at such venues as The Washington Center for the Performing Arts.

Williamson also works with the NW jazz record label Pony Boy Records.

Williamson helped to create a non-profit organization for music performance and education in North Bend, Washington, named JazzClubsNW. Williamson has also worked as a music instructor at Green River College and Bellevue College. He was the graduate jazz and percussion assistant at Central Washington University for two years. Williamson is also a jazz and percussion instructor at Western Washington University.

In 2019, Williamson published a 62-page book called Jazz Traditions A Collection of Drum Set Teaching (ISBN 0359765742, 978-0359765744).
