= Dan Attoe =

American painter

Dan Attoe is an American painter, sculptor, and author. Attoe is recognized for his detailed landscape and figurative paintings, as well as his neon sculptures featuring humorous or philosophical text.

== Early life and education ==
Born in 1975 in Bremerton, Washington, Attoe spent his childhood in various locations, including Island Park and Ashton, Idaho, and Silver Bay, Minnesota, due to his father's employment with the U.S. Forest Service. His mother often worked as a librarian. Attoe earned his BFA from the University of Wisconsin–Madison and UW–Stevens Point at Wausau in 1998, and his MFA from the University of Iowa in 2004. His first novel, The Taking Tree, was published in May 2024. He studied writing at The Writers' Workshop while pursuing his MFA at the University of Iowa. He is one of the founders of the collaborative art group Paintallica but left the group in 2017 due to creative differences.

Attoe worked part-time at Wausau Window and Wall Systems in Wausau, Wisconsin, for four years and held positions as a security guard, maintenance worker, and part-time installation technician at the Walker Art Center in Minneapolis. Currently, Attoe resides in Washougal, Washington, where he operates a tattoo shop named Dan’s Tattoos.

== Painting ==
When Attoe was a psychology major he began doing a painting a day, with the intention of being as different and experimental as possible; as time went one he found himself gravitating towards certain things. He tends to lean more to creating work focused on rural landscapes with woods or mountains and, more often than not, something strange happening.

One of his main forms of painting is "Accretion Paintings." Accretion meaning the gradual growth of something over time through accumulation, like how a comet grows. Building layer upon layer he often ends up creating a subtle texture to the work, like raised bumps or having certain areas thicker than others. These paintings end up being the larger ones and can take a very long time to complete.

== Solo exhibitions ==
- “The Dead of Winter II”, The Hole, L.A. 2023
- "The Dead of Winter", The Hole, New York 2022
- "Pandemic Paintings", Western Exhibitions, Chicago 2021
- "Dan Attoe", The Hole, New York 2020
- "American Dreams," curated by Tania Pardo, MUSAC, Leon, Spain
- Group Exhibition, "Shape of Things to Come," Saatchi Gallery, London
- Group Exhibition, Contemporary Northwest Art Awards, Portland Art Museum, Portland
- "Simple Thoughts and Complicated Animals," Peres Projects Berlin, Germany
- "Several Landscapes," Western Exhibitions, Chicago, IL
- "Loaded, Nailed, and short on Cash," Peres Projects, Los Angeles
- "You have more freedom than you are using," Peres Projects, Berlin, Germany
- "Vilma Gold," London, UK 404 Arte Contemporanea, Naples, Italy
- "Some of the best things I know," Peres Projects, Los Angeles
- "New Figuration," Galleri Christina Wilson, Copenhagen, Denmark
- "Some of the Best Things I know," Peres Projects, Los Angeles

== Selected group exhibitions ==
- "Hollywood Dream Bubble: Ed Ruscha’s Influence in Los Angeles and Beyond", The Hole, Los Angeles 2024
- "Chasing Light", Two-person exhibition, Andrew Reed Gallery, Miami 2023
- "Storage Wars", The Hole, Los Angeles 2023
- "The Midnight Hour", The Hole, New York 2023
- "Drawing Biennial", Western Exhibitions, Chicago 2023
- "Gravity's Rainbow", October 20 - November 24, 2007 Athens, Greece
- "8th Northwest Biennial," Tacoma Art Museum, Tacoma, Washington
- "Phantasmania," Kemper Museum of Contemporary Art, Kansas City, Missouri
- "1627-2007," artnews projects, Berlin, Germany
- "Let's go camping," John Connelly Presents, New York City, NY
- "There's no fooling you (the classics)," Peres Projects, Los Angeles
- "Montezuma's Revenge," Nicole Klagsbrun, New York City, NY
- "The Zine UnBound: Kults, Werewolves and Sarcastic Hippies," Yerba Buena Center for the Arts, San Francisco, CA
- "Growing Up Absurd," Hebert Read Gallery, Kent, England
- 2011: Geheimgesellschaften. Wissen Wagen Wollen, Schirn Kunsthalle, Frankfurt am Main, Germany

== Education ==
- 1998 BFA, University of Wisconsin–Madison, Madison, WI
- 2004 MFA, University of Iowa, Iowa City, IA
