= Bremerton, Washington =

City in Washington, United States

Bremerton
- City
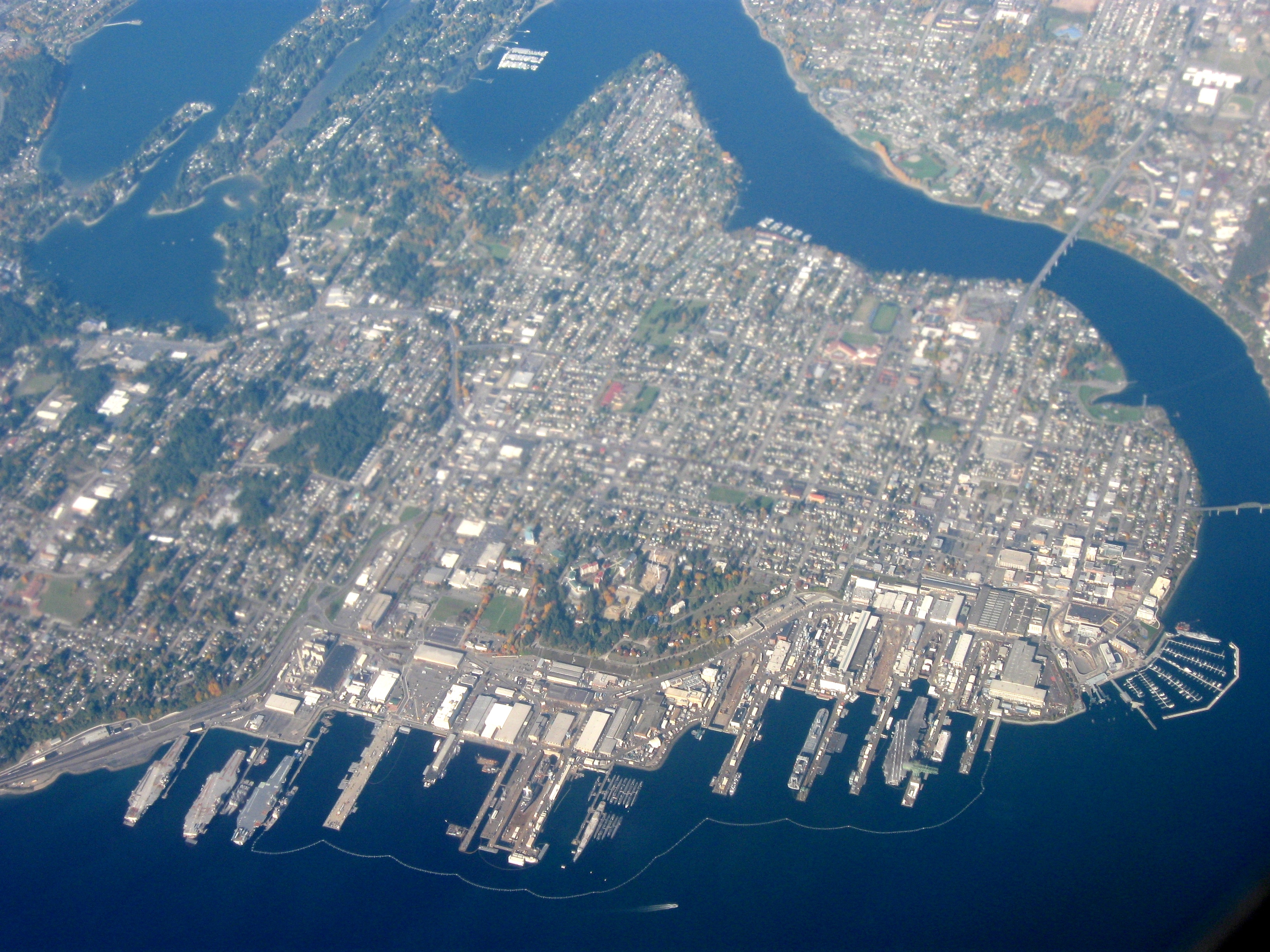
- Aerial view of the city with Puget Sound Naval Shipyard at the bottom

- Location of Bremerton, Washington
- Coordinates: 47°32′20″N 122°44′40″W
- Country: United States
- State: Washington
- County: Kitsap
- Named for: William Bremer

Government
  - Type: Mayor–council
  - Mayor: Greg Wheeler

Area
  - City: 32.17 sq mi (83.31 km^{2})
  - Land: 28.48 sq mi (73.75 km^{2})
  - Water: 3.69 sq mi (9.56 km^{2})
- Elevation: 476 ft (145 m)

Population (2020)
  - City: 43,505
  - Estimate (2024): 45,291
  - Density: 1,530.2/sq mi (590.8/km^{2})
  - Urban: 224,449 (US: 174th)
  - Urban density: 1,527.8/sq mi (589.9/km^{2})
  - Metro: 275,611 (US: 180th)
- Time zone: UTC−8 (Pacific (PST))
  - Summer (DST): UTC−7 (PDT)
- ZIP Codes: 98310–98312, 98314, 98337
- Area code: 360/564
- Sales Tax: 9%
- FIPS code: 53-07695
- GNIS feature ID: 2409899
- Website: bremertonwa.gov

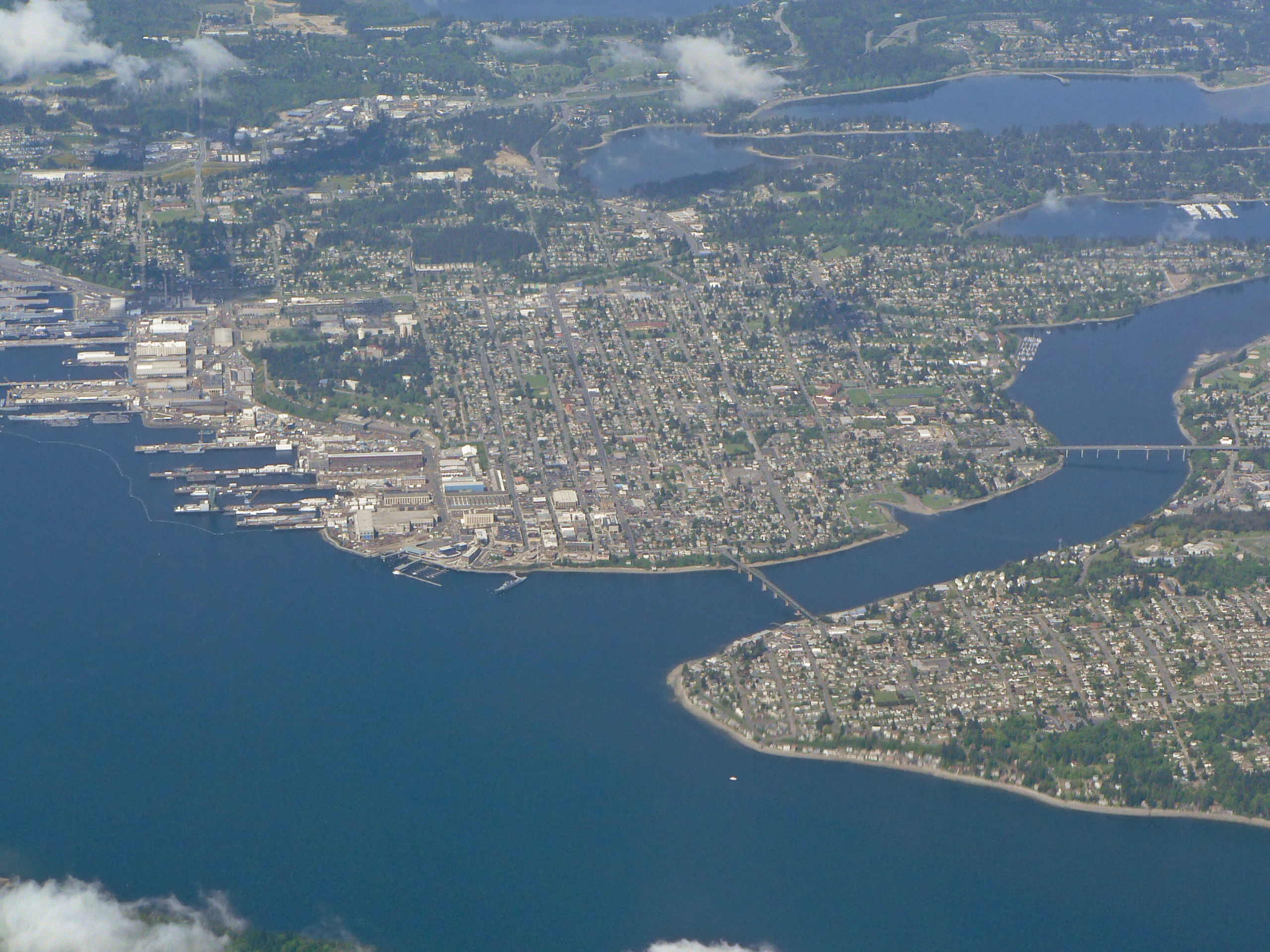
Sinclair Inlet and Puget Sound Naval Shipyard (left), Dyes Inlet (middle distance) and Manette and Warren Avenue Bridges (left to right) across Port Washington Narrows

Bremerton is a city in Kitsap County, Washington, United States. The population was 43,505 at the 2020 census and an estimated 44,122 in 2021, making it the largest city on the Kitsap Peninsula. Bremerton is home to Puget Sound Naval Shipyard and the Bremerton Annex of Naval Base Kitsap.

The city lies west of Seattle and is connected by an automobile ferry operated by Washington State Ferries and a passenger-only ferry operated by Kitsap Transit. Bremerton spans the Port Washington Narrows and extends inland along Sinclair Inlet opposite from Port Orchard.

== History ==
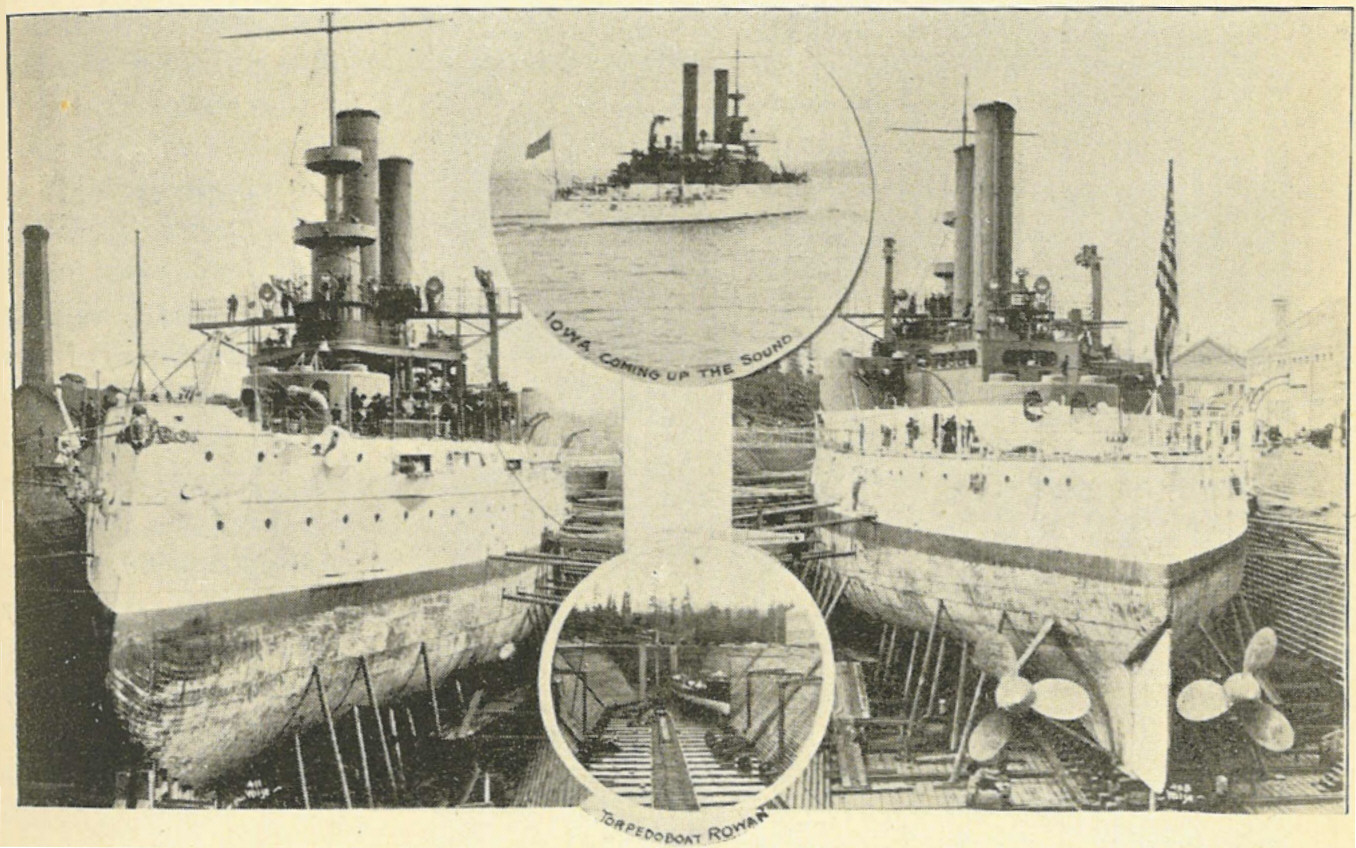
"In the Navy Yard of Puget Sound", in Seattle and the Orient (1900). Two ships are shown in drydock; the two circular insets are titled "Iowa coming up the Sound" (upper) and "Torpedoboat Rowan" (lower).

Bremerton is within the historical territory of the Suquamish people. The land was made available for non-Native settlement by the Treaty of Point Elliott of 1855. Bremerton was founded by German immigrant and real estate agent William Bremer in 1891. In that year, Navy Lieutenant Ambrose Barkley Wyckoff purchased approximately 190 acres (77 ha) of waterfront land on Sinclair Inlet. This land was owned by the Bremer family. Three years earlier, a U.S. Navy commission determined that Point Turner, between the protected waters of the Sinclair and Dyes inlets, would be the best site in the Pacific Northwest on which to establish a shipyard. Recognizing the large number of workers such a facility would employ, Bremer and his business partner and brother-in-law, Henry Hensel, purchased the undeveloped land near Point Turner at the inflated price of $200 per acre. In April 1891, Bremer arranged for the sale of 190 acres (77 ha) to the Navy at $50 per acre. This land became part of the initial footprint of the Puget Sound Navy Yard.

=== 1900–1930 ===
Bremerton was incorporated on October 15, 1901, with Alvyn Croxton serving as the city's first mayor. Progress in the new city soon faced a major crisis, as Assistant Secretary of the Navy Charles Darling moved all repair work to the Mare Island Navy Yard in California in November 1902. Darling cited reports from commanders that the Bremerton waterfront was rife with prostitution, opium houses and frequent strongarmed robberies of sailors. Politics were probably also at play, as local newspapers reported that the city's incorporation left the shipyard essentially landlocked without room to expand. A dispute ensued between Mayor Croxton, who wanted to shutter all saloons in Bremerton, and three members of the city council, who attempted to block his efforts. Croxton eventually won out, and the council voted to revoke all liquor licenses in June 1904. With the ban, Darling reestablished the navy yard as a port of call. Saloons had begun to return to business within two years, however.

In 1908, the city library and Union High School were established to serve the educational needs of the 2,993 residents recorded in the 1910 U.S. census. During World War I, submarine construction and the addition of a third drydock caused the shipyard's workforce to balloon to over 4,000 employees. Growth due to the war effort and the 1918 annexation of the city of Manette, east of Bremerton on the Port Washington Narrows, can be seen in the 1920 census, which reported a population of 8,918. Bremerton absorbed Charleston, its neighboring city to the south in 1927. The population reached 10,170 in 1930.

=== 1930s and 1940s ===
Manette was linked to Bremerton by the Manette Bridge, a 1,573-foot (479 m) bridge constructed in June 1930. Prior to this time, the trip could only be made by ferry or a long trip around Dyes Inlet through Chico, Silverdale, and Tracyton on mostly unimproved roads. This wooden bridge was replaced with a concrete and steel structure in October 1949. It was replaced by the new Manette Bridge in 2011. At the shipyard, the 250-foot-tall (76 m) Hammerhead Crane No. 28 was completed in April 1933. One of the nation's largest, it is capable of lifting 250 tons and continues to dominate the Bremerton skyline.

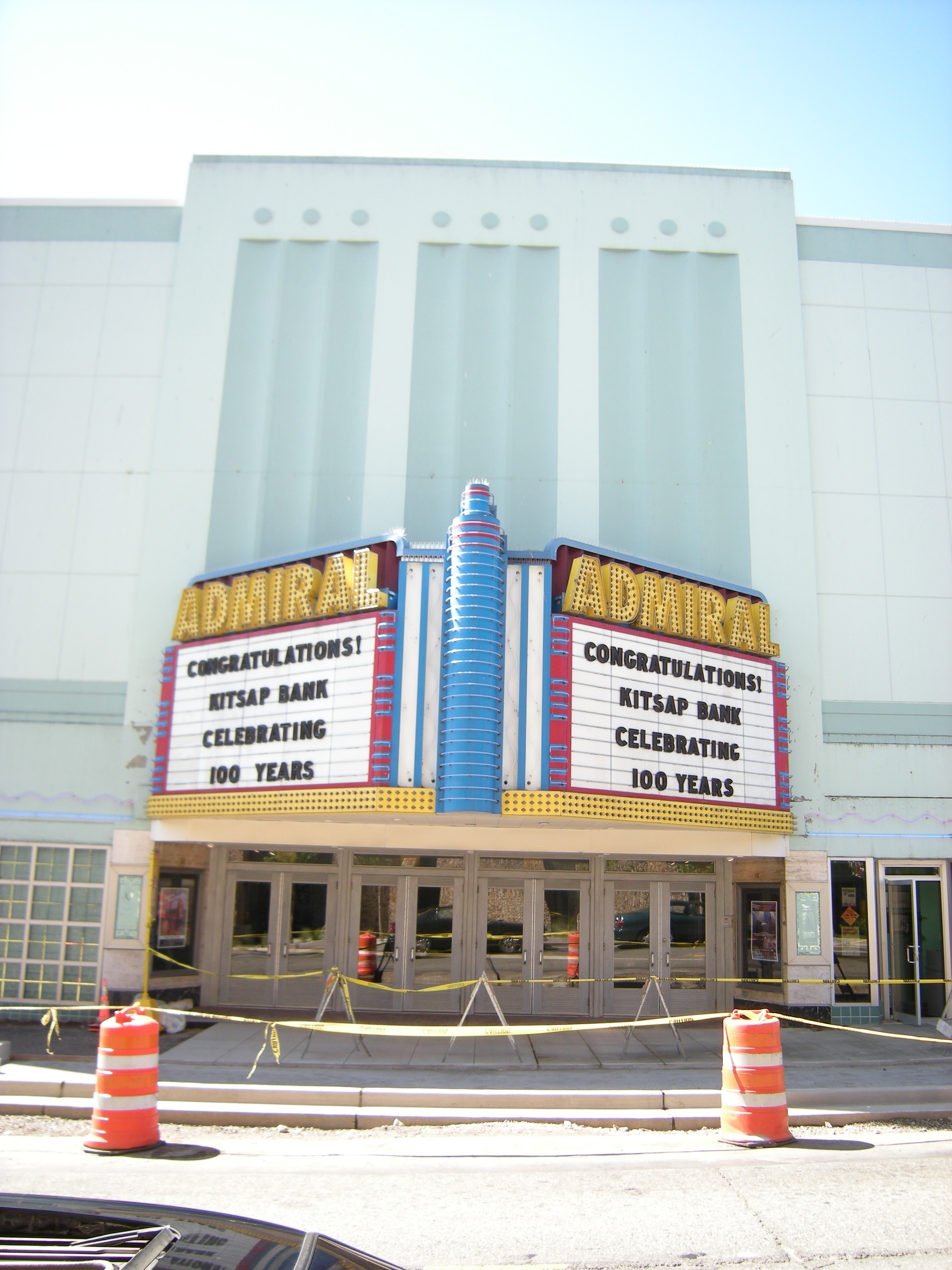
Bremerton's Admiral Theater opened in 1942 as a cinema; in the 1990s it was remodeled for performances and banquets.

At the peak of World War II, the Bremerton area was home to an estimated 80,000 residents due to the heavy workload of shipbuilding, repair and maintenance required for the Pacific war effort. Most of the relocation was temporary, though, and only 27,678 citizens were left in the city by 1950. During the 1940s, presidents Franklin D. Roosevelt and Harry S. Truman both visited Bremerton. Roosevelt made a campaign stop at the Puget Sound Naval Shipyard on August 12, 1944, giving a national radio address in front of a backdrop of civilian workers. During the course of his 35-minute speech, it is believed the president suffered an angina attack, experiencing severe chest and shoulder pain. An electrocardiogram was immediately administered once he left the podium, but it showed nothing abnormal.

President Truman took a two-day tour of Washington state in 1948, speaking from the balcony of the Elks Club on the morning of June 10. Local legend has it that a man in the large Pacific Avenue crowd yelled the infamous "Give 'em hell, Harry!" line for the first time. This is a matter of dispute, however, as local newspapers quoted the man as having shouted "Lay it on, Harry!" Despite this, there is a bronze plaque attached to the corner of the building declaring that spot to be the place where the phrase "Give 'em hell, Harry" was first uttered.

With the return of World War II soldiers, the need for post-secondary education became evident to officials of the Bremerton School District. Olympic Junior College (now Olympic College), a two-year institution, opened its doors to 575 students in the fall of 1946. Initially, it operated in the former Lincoln School building, gradually moving operations to World War II–surplus Quonset buildings at its current 16th & Chester site. About 100 students received associate degrees at the first commencement exercises held June 10, 1948. President Truman was in attendance and received the college's first honorary degree. Operation of the college transferred from the school district to the state of Washington in 1967.

=== 1950–1970 ===
A second high school opened in 1956, and two comprehensive high schools operated in the city until 1978. Growth in East Bremerton necessitated the construction of another span across the Port Washington Narrows in 1958. The $5.3 million, four-lane Warren Avenue Bridge allowed for increased traffic on State Highway 21-B (now State Route 303).

The battleship USS Missouri, site of the Japanese surrender treaty signing that ended World War II, was assigned to the Pacific Reserve Fleet at PSNS in 1955. For 30 years, she served as the city's primary tourist attraction. Hundreds of thousands of visitors walked the "surrender deck" before the ship was recommissioned in 1985. She was decommissioned on March 31, 1992 (final), and her name was struck off the register on January 12, 1995. In 1998 "Mighty Mo" was donated to the USS Missouri Memorial Association and became a museum ship at Pearl Harbor, Hawaii.

Population growth was flat, with 26,681 enumerated in the 1960 census, leading Bremerton leaders to annex the shipyard the following year in an effort to include stationed sailors in those figures. While the Vietnam War spawned protests and sit-ins on the Olympic College campus, the city was relatively free of civil disorder during the 1960s.

=== 1970s ===
With the 1973 selection of the Bangor Ammunition Depot 12 miles (19 km) northwest of Bremerton as the Pacific home of the new Trident submarine fleet, residential and commercial development began to move north, closer to Silverdale, and farther from the Bremerton downtown core. Numerous failed proposals were made at redevelopment beginning in the early 1970s, including discussions of a waterfront hotel and the erection of a large canopy over the central business district. Meanwhile, most of the city's office and retail space remained in the control of Edward Bremer, son of William Bremer and the sole remaining heir to his wealth. Bremer began to neglect his properties, never increasing decades-old lease rates and failing to make necessary maintenance upgrades. In 1978, the Bremerton City Council passed an ordinance declaring the entire downtown a "blighted area".

=== 1980s ===
In 1985, Safeco subsidiary Winmar Corporation developed the Kitsap Mall in Silverdale. With lower taxes and minimal planning regulations in the unincorporated town, Silverdale achieved virtually unfettered growth. Sears, J.C. Penney, Montgomery Ward, Nordstrom Place Two, Woolworth and Rite Aid all closed their downtown Bremerton stores in the 1980s and 1990s. Upon the death of Edward Bremer in 1987, the Bremer properties were placed under the complete control of a trust held by Olympic College. Not being in the real-estate business, the college did not actively market its holdings, and the downtown was composed almost entirely of very large empty storefronts. As of January 2010, many buildings remained vacant.

=== 1990–present ===
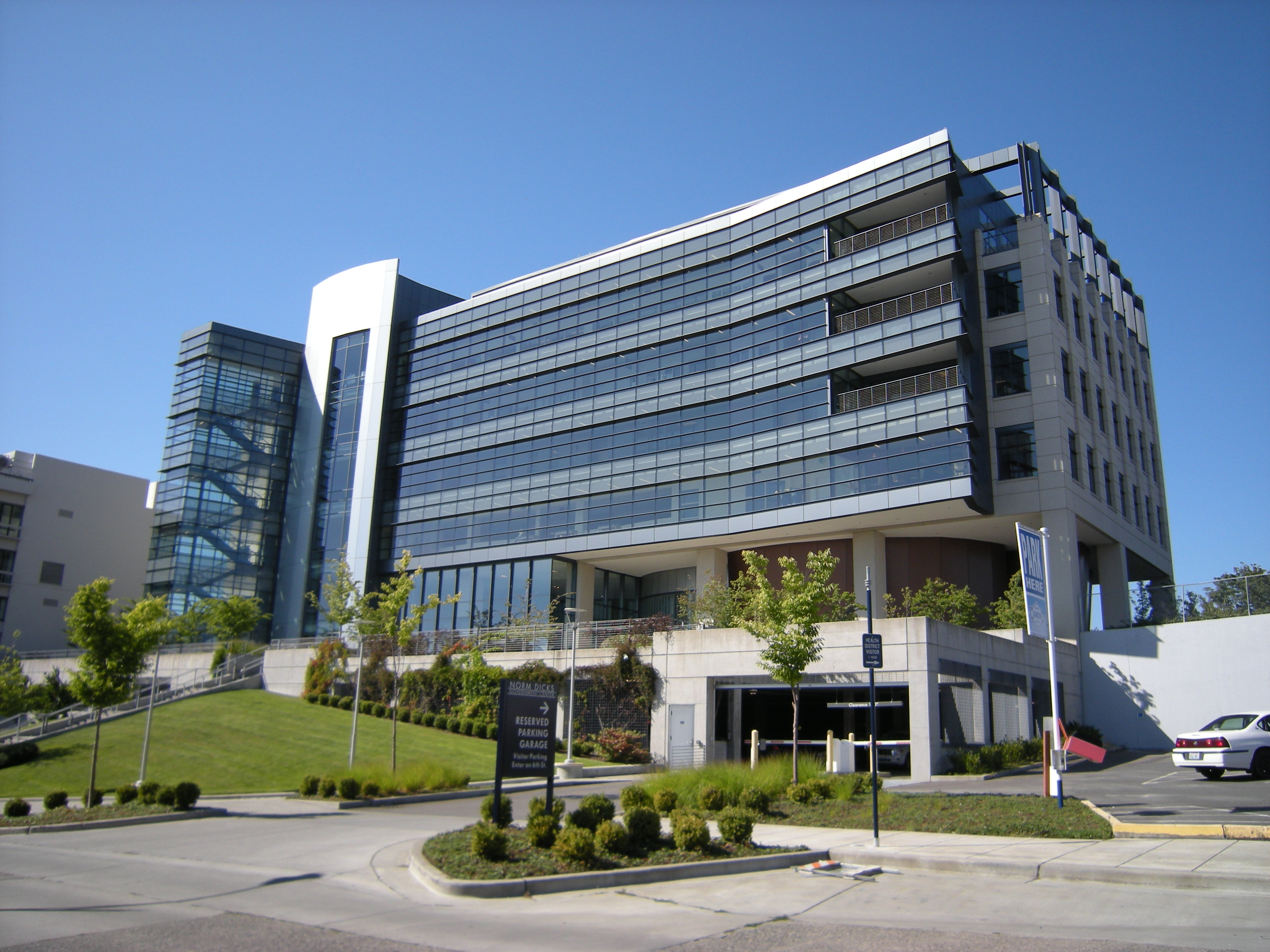
The Norm Dicks Government Center

Despite a hard-fought battle throughout the mid-1990s by local politicians to have the decommissioned and mothballed USS Missouri, already in the Bremerton Navy Yard, stay in Bremerton as a museum ship and tourist attraction, Secretary of the Navy John H. Dalton awarded the ship to the Pearl Harbor Naval Base, Hawaii, in 1998. It now sits near the USS Arizona Memorial to demonstrate where U.S. involvement in World War II started on December 7, 1941, and where it ended by the signing of the instrument of surrender by the Japanese on board the USS Missouri, on September 2, 1945.

Beginning with the building of a waterfront boardwalk and marina in 1992, Bremerton had begun the process of revitalizing its downtown community. That same year, the Bremerton Historic Ships Association opened the destroyer USS Turner Joy (DD-951) to public tours at the end of the boardwalk; the ship was built in the Puget Sound area in 1958, commissioned in 1959, and had played a back-up role in the 1964 Gulf of Tonkin incident that further escalated U.S. involvement in the Vietnam War with the Congressional passage of the Gulf of Tonkin Resolution, allowing President Lyndon B. Johnson to send fighting troops in addition to the "advisors" already on the ground in Vietnam.

In 2000, Bremerton saw the opening of the waterfront multimodal bus/ferry terminal and a hotel/conference center complex in 2004. The high-rise Norm Dicks Government Center also opened that year, housing City Hall and other government offices. The Waterfront Fountain Park and Naval History Museum adjacent to the Bremerton Bus/Ferry Terminal opened in 2007, and a newly expanded marina with more boat capacity was completed in 2008. Plans to build an extension to the current boardwalk from the USS Turner Joy to Evergreen Park is in the litigation stage. Even though the boardwalk extension project is fully funded, opposition to the extension by the Suquamish Tribe concerning the impact to treaty fishing rights threatens the project. Fairfield Inn and Suites by Marriott, a 132-room hotel, opened in March 2010 on the site of the old City Hall building made obsolete by the new Norm Dicks Government Building.

Condominiums were built on the waterfront to lure more people to live and shop in the downtown area as part of the revitalization effort. However, construction delays and economic downturn forced the builder of the publicly funded Harborside Condominium complex, the Kitsap County Consolidated Housing Authority, to fall $40.5 million in debt. That debt later was taken on by Kitsap County, which hired a marketing firm to sell the remaining units at a lower-than-anticipated price. The privately built 400-condominium complex north of the Harborside complex opened shortly before the Harborside complex and also did not sell as well as projected. The remaining empty condos were eventually sold at auction for a lower cost.

The 2.5-acre (1.0 ha) Harborside Fountain Park opened on May 5, 2007. Located on the waterfront just steps away from the Kitsap Conference Center, the park features five large copper-ringed fountains, wading pools, and lush landscaping. The park will also be home to the Harborside Heritage Naval Museum.

A tunnel underneath downtown, traversing from the ferry terminal to State Route 304 (Burwell Street), was opened to funnel traffic from the car ferry away from downtown streets. A new fountain park above the tunnel blends water and art, along with the bow of a ship and the conning tower of a submarine as a tribute to the workers at the Bremerton Naval Shipyard over the years. The stations along the walk include pictures of the shipyard, workers, and shipbuilding and repair statistics.

== Geography ==
Bremerton, the largest city in Kitsap County, is located directly west of Seattle across Puget Sound on the Kitsap Peninsula. It is bounded on the southeast and east by Sinclair Inlet and the strait of Port Orchard respectively. The city is divided by the Port Washington Narrows, a strait spanned by two bridges that connect the eastern and western sides of the city. The part of the city northeast of the narrows is referred to as East Bremerton. The city limits extend to the southwest as far as the Mason County line and include Bremerton National Airport. Bremerton is bordered to the south, across Sinclair Inlet, by the city of Port Orchard.

According to the U.S. Census Bureau, Bremerton has a total area of 32.29 square miles (8,360 ha), of which 28.41 square miles (7,360 ha) are land and 3.88 square miles (1,000 ha) are water.

=== Neighborhoods ===
==== Downtown ====
The ferry terminal and waterfront are the heart of downtown. As Bremerton's historic center, downtown has seen the most dramatic change over the last decade, with blighted blocks being replaced by new apartments, and older buildings being restored. Attractions include Harborside Fountain Park, a boardwalk, and multiple naval history museums. The Admiral Theatre, a restored 1942 Art Deco theater, is Bremerton's most prominent venue for live music and entertainment. The district is known for breweries, coffeeshops, art galleries, and restaurants showcasing diverse cuisines. The city is in the beginning stages of creating a public square on Fourth Street to honor local music icon Quincy Jones.

==== Manette ====
Across the water from Downtown is Manette, a neighborhood on a separate peninsula that functioned as its own town from 1891 to 1930. It was annexed by Bremerton in 1918, and the first Manette Bridge was completed in 1930. Today, Manette is connected to Bremerton via the new Manette Bridge, completed in 2011.

==== Charleston ====
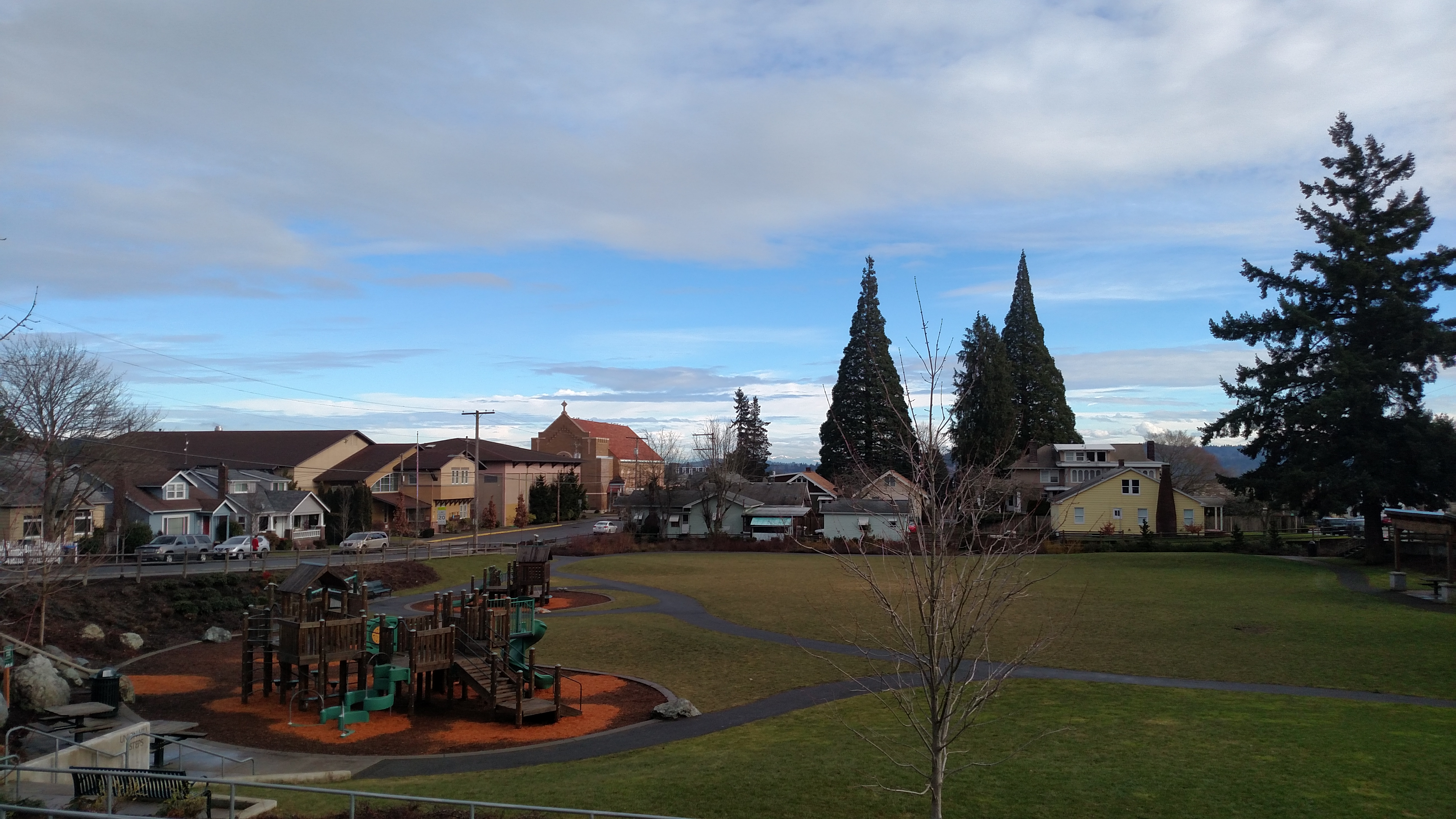
Union Hill's sequoias and Our Lady Star of the Sea Catholic church, as seen from the upper deck of Kiwanis Park

Charleston was formerly an independent town built to house and entertain sailors, and was annexed by the city in 1927. The neighborhood's center is Callow Avenue, a retail corridor anchored by The Charleston music venue. Charleston is a designated center in Bremerton's comprehensive plan, and has seen recent improvements to its streetscape. Charleston is casually defined by 11th Street to the north, Naval Avenue to the east, 1st Street to the south, and Cambrian Avenue to the west.

==== Union Hill ====
Between Charleston and Downtown is the Union Hill neighborhood. Its borders are Naval Avenue to the west, 11th Street to the north, Warren Avenue to the east, and the Naval Shipyard to the south. Union Hill is a predominantly residential neighborhood, showcasing Bremerton's most historic churches and a synagogue along Veneta Avenue. Near Veneta and 6th is Bremerton's most architecturally notable place of worship, Our Lady Star of the Sea Catholic Church; non-native towering sequoias; and a large park.

==== Evergreen ====
North of downtown's 11th Street boundary is the Evergreen neighborhood, anchored by Evergreen Park and bordered to the west by Warren Avenue. Evergreen Park offers beach access and a boat ramp, and hosts a weekly farmer's market in the summer. Evergreen is characterized by residential neighborhoods and water views.

==== Haddon ====
West of Evergreen and north of Union Hill and Charleston is Haddon. Haddon's center is Lulu Haddon Park, but Bremerton High School and Olympic College's campus are main focal points as well. Though it is an older, sleepier neighborhood traditionally more connected with the shipyard and local business, the Haddon neighborhood has recently gained notice for a few quirky businesses.

== Climate ==
Bremerton has a Mediterranean climate (Köppen Csb), with warm dry summers and wet semi-mild winters. Average annual precipitation is 56.93 inches (1,446.0 mm), with annual snowfall averaging 3 inches (7.62 cm). The wettest year has been 1999 with 75.81 inches (1,925.6 mm) and the driest 1943 with 22.73 inches (577.3 mm). The city falls in USDA climate zone 8.

Climate data for Bremerton, Washington, 1991–2020 normals, extremes 1899–present
Month	Jan	Feb	Mar	Apr	May	Jun	Jul	Aug	Sep	Oct	Nov	Dec	Year
Record high °F (°C)	64 (18)	72 (22)	80 (27)	89 (32)	92 (33)	102 (39)	99 (37)	101 (38)	97 (36)	88 (31)	74 (23)	71 (22)	102 (39)
Mean maximum °F (°C)	55.8 (13.2)	59.4 (15.2)	67.7 (19.8)	74.6 (23.7)	82.6 (28.1)	85.9 (29.9)	90.8 (32.7)	89.9 (32.2)	85.5 (29.7)	73.5 (23.1)	61.3 (16.3)	54.9 (12.7)	93.7 (34.3)
Mean daily maximum °F (°C)	46.6 (8.1)	49.4 (9.7)	53.7 (12.1)	59.0 (15.0)	65.8 (18.8)	70.2 (21.2)	76.5 (24.7)	77.3 (25.2)	71.9 (22.2)	60.6 (15.9)	51.2 (10.7)	45.6 (7.6)	60.7 (15.9)
Daily mean °F (°C)	41.1 (5.1)	42.3 (5.7)	45.7 (7.6)	50.0 (10.0)	56.2 (13.4)	60.7 (15.9)	65.6 (18.7)	66.2 (19.0)	61.5 (16.4)	52.6 (11.4)	45.0 (7.2)	40.3 (4.6)	52.3 (11.2)
Mean daily minimum °F (°C)	35.6 (2.0)	35.1 (1.7)	37.7 (3.2)	41.0 (5.0)	46.5 (8.1)	51.1 (10.6)	54.6 (12.6)	55.1 (12.8)	51.1 (10.6)	44.7 (7.1)	38.7 (3.7)	35.0 (1.7)	43.9 (6.6)
Mean minimum °F (°C)	24.8 (−4.0)	25.2 (−3.8)	29.1 (−1.6)	32.7 (0.4)	37.0 (2.8)	43.7 (6.5)	47.9 (8.8)	48.6 (9.2)	42.4 (5.8)	34.9 (1.6)	26.9 (−2.8)	23.8 (−4.6)	20.3 (−6.5)
Record low °F (°C)	12 (−11)	12 (−11)	19 (−7)	23 (−5)	27 (−3)	37 (3)	39 (4)	40 (4)	30 (−1)	27 (−3)	10 (−12)	7 (−14)	7 (−14)
Average precipitation inches (mm)	9.28 (236)	5.83 (148)	6.37 (162)	3.86 (98)	2.36 (60)	1.61 (41)	0.83 (21)	1.09 (28)	1.80 (46)	5.14 (131)	8.84 (225)	9.92 (252)	56.93 (1,448)
Average snowfall inches (cm)	0.6 (1.5)	0.7 (1.8)	0.1 (0.25)	0.0 (0.0)	0.0 (0.0)	0.0 (0.0)	0.0 (0.0)	0.0 (0.0)	0.0 (0.0)	0.0 (0.0)	0.3 (0.76)	1.3 (3.3)	3.0 (7.6)
Average precipitation days (≥ 0.01 in)	19.4	15.8	19.2	16.0	12.1	10.7	5.8	5.7	9.1	15.5	18.6	19.2	167.1
Average snowy days (≥ 0.1 in)	0.5	0.3	0.1	0.0	0.0	0.0	0.0	0.0	0.0	0.0	0.2	0.5	1.6
Source 1: NOAA
Source 2: National Weather Service

== Demographics ==
Historical population
Census	Pop.	Note	%±
1910	2,993		—
1920	8,918		198.0%
1930	10,170		14.0%
1940	15,134		48.8%
1950	27,678		82.9%
1960	28,922		4.5%
1970	35,307		22.1%
1980	36,208		2.6%
1990	38,142		5.3%
2000	37,259		−2.3%
2010	37,729		1.3%
2020	43,505		15.3%
2024 (est.)	45,291		4.1%
U.S. Decennial Census

Based on per capita income, Bremerton ranks 341st of 522 areas in the state of Washington to be ranked.

=== 2020 census ===
As of the 2020 census, Bremerton had a population of 43,505. The median age was 32.4 years. Children under 18 made up 18.4% of the population, and 14.0% of residents were 65 years of age or older. For every 100 females there were 111.8 males, and for every 100 females age 18 and over there were 114.6 males age 18 and over.

99.8% of residents lived in urban areas, while 0.2% lived in rural areas.

There were 16,809 households in Bremerton, of which 26.0% had children under the age of 18 living in them. Of all households, 35.7% were married-couple households, 25.7% were households with a male householder and no spouse or partner present, and 28.8% were households with a female householder and no spouse or partner present. About 35.1% of all households were made up of individuals and 12.6% had someone living alone who was 65 years of age or older.

There were 18,351 housing units, of which 8.4% were vacant. The homeowner vacancy rate was 1.3% and the rental vacancy rate was 7.8%.

Racial composition as of the 2020 census
Race	Number	Percent
White	29,028	66.7%
Black or African American	3,050	7.0%
American Indian and Alaska Native	683	1.6%
Asian	2,748	6.3%
Native Hawaiian and Other Pacific Islander	666	1.5%
Some other race	1,984	4.6%
Two or more races	5,346	12.3%
Hispanic or Latino (of any race)	5,643	13.0%

=== 2010 census ===
As of the 2010 census, there were 37,729 people, 14,932 households, and 7,853 families residing in the city. The population density was 1,328.0 inhabitants per square mile (512.7/km^{2}). There were 17,273 housing units at an average density of 608.0 per square mile (234.8/km^{2}). The racial makeup of the city was 74.0% White, 6.7% African American, 2.0% Native American, 5.5% Asian, 1.3% Pacific Islander, 2.8% from other races, and 7.6% from two or more races. Hispanic or Latino of any race were 9.6% of the population.

There were 14,932 households, of which 27.5% had children under the age of 18 living with them, 34.4% were married couples living together, 12.9% had a female householder with no husband present, 5.3% had a male householder with no wife present, and 47.4% were non-families. 37.3% of all households were made up of individuals, and 12.2% had someone living alone who was 65 years of age or older. The average household size was 2.24 and the average family size was 2.93.

The median age in the city was 31.9 years. 19.5% of residents were under the age of 18; 17.1% were between the ages of 18 and 24; 29% were from 25 to 44; 22.5% were from 45 to 64; and 11.9% were 65 years of age or older. The gender makeup of the city was 53.1% male and 46.9% female.

== Government and politics ==
Bremerton is divided among three state legislative districts in Kitsap County, the 23rd legislative district to the north, 35th legislative district in the center and 26th legislative district to the south.

Before redistricting in 2012, the line separating the first and sixth Congressional districts ran through East Bremerton. As a result of the 2012 redistricting, all of Bremerton now lies within the sixth Congressional district. The district is represented by Emily Randall, who was first elected to that position in 2024. Prior to Randall, Derek Kilmer served as sixth district Representative from 2012 to 2025.

Greg Wheeler was elected mayor in 2017 and re-elected in 2021. Incorporated as a first-class city, Bremerton has been governed by a nonpartisan strong mayor and seven-member city council since 1985. Each member is elected from one of seven districts who in turn elect one member as President. The current form of government was established by a 1983 charter that eliminated a decades-old city commission composed of a mayor, public works commissioner and finance commissioner.

Each member of the Kitsap County Board of Commissioners represents a portion of the city of Bremerton. This arrangement was an attempt to balance Bremerton's commercial influence with the remainder of the county, though most of its sales tax base has since relocated to unincorporated areas.

Bremerton politics can vary in intensity, with some city council positions regularly unopposed and others having as many as four candidates in the 2005 primary election, and seven candidates in the 2021 election. As with most cities in the region, Bremerton precincts have historically been more favorable for Democratic candidates in state and federal elections, contrasting with more conservative-leaning voters in rural areas of the county.

== Culture ==
Bremerton is home to the longest-running Armed Forces Day Parade in the United States west of the Mississippi River. All branches of the military, police and firefighters, youth organizations, dignitaries, commercial businesses, car clubs, Bremerton High School's marching band, and more participate in the Downtown for an afternoon celebration on the third Saturday of May. Annual attendance is between 22,000 to 40,000 people.

The Blackberry Festival is held annually during Labor Day weekend on the waterfront boardwalk to celebrate blackberries. The three-day event include food stalls, arts and crafts, live entertainment, foot races, and a bicycle race. Bremerton National Airport sponsors the annual Blackberry Festival Fly-In, which is accessed through Kitsap Transit's shuttle buses.

== Education ==
Public schools are operated by the Bremerton School District, Central Kitsap School District, and South Kitsap School District. College level education is offered by Olympic College.

Christ the King Lutheran School is a Pre-K-8 grade school of the Wisconsin Evangelical Lutheran Synod in Bremerton.

== Sports and recreation ==
Bremerton was home to the Kitsap BlueJackets, a summer collegiate baseball team that played in the West Coast League from 2005 to 2016. The BlueJackets played at Gene Lobe Field, located on the county fairgrounds, and had low attendance due to their lack of winning seasons. The team planned to move to a new league, but instead moved to Port Angeles to become the Port Angeles Lefties in 2017. The city previously had another minor league baseball team, the Bremerton Bluejackets of the Western International League, in the late 1940s.

The Kitsap Pumas, a semi-professional soccer team in the USL Premier Development League (PDL), were based in Bremerton from 2009 to 2018. The team won the league's national championship in 2011 and finished as runners-up in 2014; they also participated in the U.S. Open Cup and defeated professional teams in the upper leagues of the national pyramid. After moving to the National Premier Soccer League for their final two seasons, the Pumas (then renamed Kitsap Soccer Club) folded in 2018 due to attendance figures declining significantly since their early years.

Several junior ice hockey teams have played at the Bremerton Ice Center, which operated the West Sound Warriors from 2003 to 2019. The team, originally named the Puget Sound Tomahawks, were relocated from Tacoma in 2003; they played in the Northern Pacific Hockey League until it disbanded in 2016, then moved to the United States Premier Hockey League. The Warriors name was transferred to the relocated Vancouver Rangers of the Western States Hockey League in 2017, but the team suspended operations at the end of their first season. A new team, the West Sound Admirals of the Western States Hockey League, played the following season in Bremerton but disbanded before the end of the 2019–20 season. The Bremerton Sockeyes of the United States Premier Hockey League formed in 2024 and play at the Bremerton Ice Center.

The city was home to a semi-professional basketball team, named the Kitsap Admirals, that played in various leagues from 2012 to 2023. They were founded as an expansion team in the American Basketball Association and later played as an independent franchise before they moved to the North American Basketball League.

In 2005, the International Speedway Corporation proposed the construction of a NASCAR racetrack near Bremerton National Airport after a previous plan for Marysville was shelved. The planned 1.2-mile (1.9 km) racetrack would seat 80,000 spectators and cover 950 acres (380 ha); half of the projected $345 million cost would be financed by the state government through bonds. Local residents and elected officials both protested the plan, which was eventually abandoned in 2007 after a lack of support from the state legislature. A NASCAR Grand National Series race had previously been held at the airport in April 1957 as part of Seafair, but only attracted 14 drivers and 2,500 spectators—far short of the expected turnout.

== Infrastructure ==
=== Transportation ===
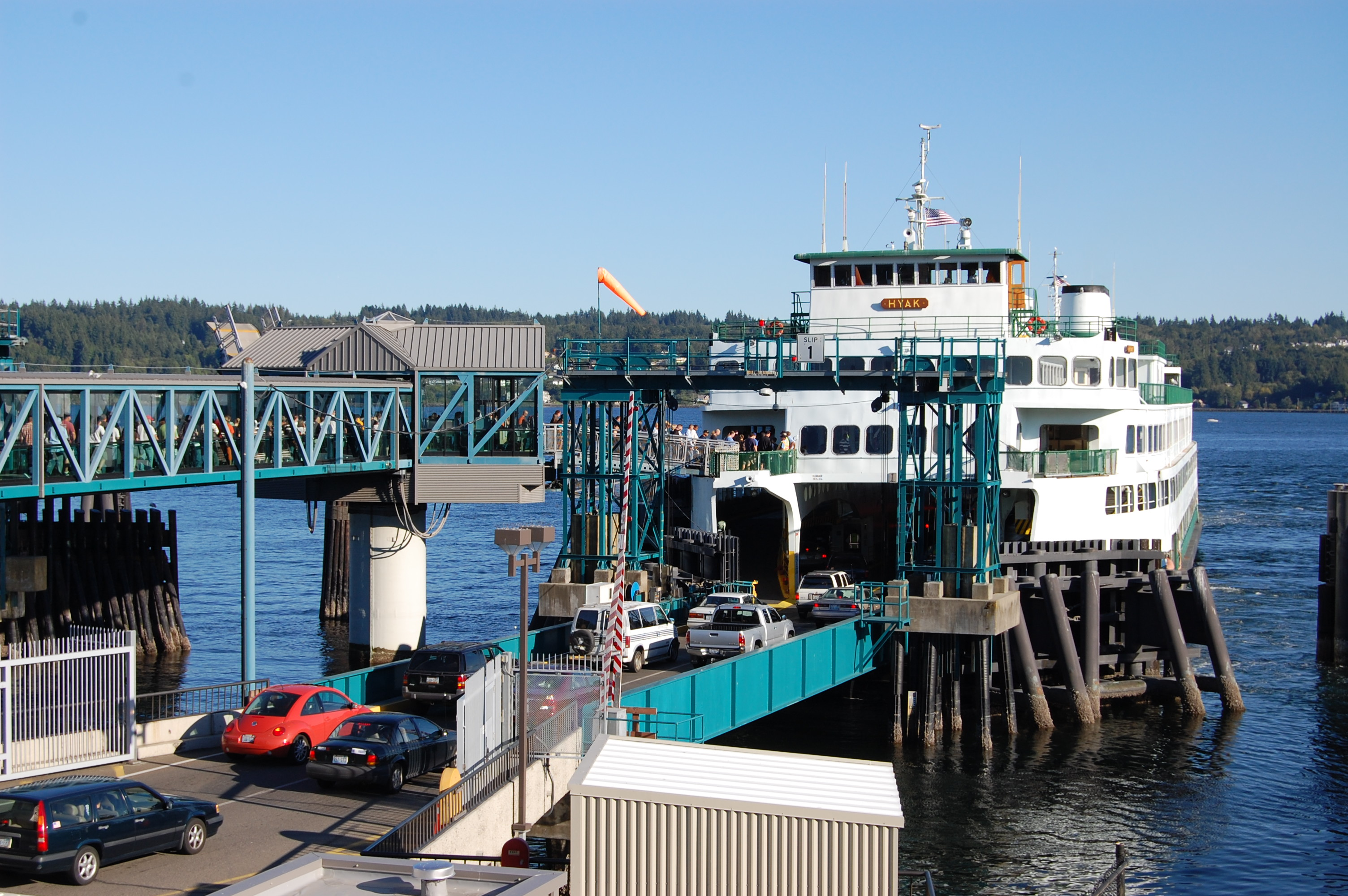
MV Hyak of the Washington State Ferries system loading vehicles at the Bremerton Transportation Center, 2008

The Bremerton Transportation Center is a major intermodal hub for Kitsap County that opened in 2000 and is served by ferries and buses. The Washington State Ferries system, the largest of its kind in the United States, operates the Seattle–Bremerton ferry with large vessels capable of carrying up to 1,500 passengers and 144 vehicles. In 2024, the Seattle–Bremerton route carried 990,435 total passengers and 362,529 vehicles. The facility is also the main hub for Kitsap Transit, the provider of public transit in Bremerton and Kitsap County. The agency operates passenger-only Kitsap Fast Ferries to Seattle as well as local foot ferries to Port Orchard and Annapolis. Kitsap Transit's buses serve the terminal as well as other areas of the city. The state ferry takes approximately an hour to complete its Seattle–Bremerton journey, while the fast ferries take 28 minutes.

The main highway through Bremerton and surrounding areas is State Route 3, which connects the Kitsap Peninsula to Shelton and the Hood Canal Bridge. In western Bremerton, State Route 3 is a freeway that bypasses the city center; other state highways, including State Route 303 and State Route 304, provide connections within the city. Two bridges over the Port Washington Narrows connect Downtown Bremerton to nearby neighborhoods: the Warren Avenue Bridge, which carries State Route 303 and opened in 1958; and the Manette Bridge, which opened in 1929 and was replaced by a new structure in 2011.

Bremerton National Airport is located in southwestern Bremerton and is operated by the Port of Bremerton primarily for general aviation and corporate jets. It has a 6,000-foot (1,800 m) runway that is capable of landing some jet airliners, over 162 hangars, and an industrial park with warehouses. The airport was built in 1936 for civilian use and was later used by the United States Navy for operations during World War II and most of the late 20th century. The Port of Bremerton was deeded the airport in 1963 and has proposed an extension of the runway to accommodate regular commercial service. Bremerton National was among a shortlist of candidates in the state government's 2021 study into alternative airports to relieve capacity issues at Seattle–Tacoma International Airport, the largest commercial airport in the region.

== Notable people ==
=== Arts and entertainment ===
- Dan Attoe, painter and sculptor
- Jill Banner, film actress
- Adelaide Hawley Cumming, vaudeville performer and radio host
- Avram Davidson, author and literary critic
- Howard Duff, actor, radio voice of Sam Spade
- Brent David Fraser, actor
- Geologic, lead rapper for Blue Scholars
- Elizabeth George, Christian author
- Ben Gibbard, musician
- John Michael Greer, druid and author
- Mike Herrera, bass guitarist vocalist for band MxPx
- Steven Holl, architect, born in Bremerton
- Quincy Jones, musician, producer, and songwriter
- Douglas Kahn, historian and theorist of media and the arts
- Buddy Knox, singer and songwriter
- Glenn Jarstad, mayor
- Jack Lenor Larsen, textile designer, author, and collector
- Gary Miranda, poet
- Pat O'Day (né Paul Berg), longtime KJR radio personality
- Joe Pichler, actor
- Dorothy Provine, actress
- Sango, music producer
- Tom Wisniewski, guitarist for band MxPx
- Heather Young, actress
- Harold Covington, White supremacist author

=== Athletics ===
- Nathan Adrian, swimmer and five-time Olympic gold medalist
- Buddy Allin, professional golfer who won five PGA Tour events in 1970s
- George Bayer, professional golfer on PGA Tour and Senior PGA Tour
- Willie Bloomquist, baseball player for Arizona Diamondbacks and Seattle Mariners
- Chuck Broyles, head football coach at Pittsburg State University
- Larry Gunselman, racing driver and owner of Max Q Motorsports
- Don Heinrich, American football player, coach, and announcer
- Rondin Johnson, former MLB second baseman for Kansas City Royals
- Dana Kirk and Tara Kirk, the first sisters to be members of the same U.S. Olympic swim team
- Mike Levenseller, football player
- Benji Olson, former offensive guard for NFL's Tennessee Titans
- Logan Owen, professional racing cyclist
- Kevin Sargent, former player for NFL's Cincinnati Bengals
- Alex Smith, former NFL quarterback
- John Stroeder, former professional basketball player
- Champ Summers, former professional baseball player
- Ted Tappe, former professional baseball player
- Nick Tucker, racing driver
- Marvin Williams, signed by NBA's Atlanta Hawks
- Marc Wilson, former quarterback for NFL teams
- Chris Harris, professional wrestler

=== Government and politicians ===
- Frank Chopp, Washington State Speaker of the House, grew up in Bremerton
- Francis Cogswell, U.S. Navy captain and Navy Cross recipient
- Norm Dicks, 18-term U.S. congressman
- Mike Enzi, U.S. senator from Wyoming, born in Bremerton
- Emily Randall, U.S. congresswoman for Washington's 6th Congressional District (2025–present)

=== Other ===
- Augusta Cohen Coontz, American First Lady of Guam
- Bill Gates Sr., father of the Microsoft multi-billionaire
- Margaret Grubb, first wife of Scientology founder L. Ron Hubbard
- Mary Beardslee Hinds, American First Lady of Guam
- L. Ron Hubbard, Scientology founder, attended Union High School

== Sister cities ==
Bremerton has the following sister cities:

- Kure, Japan
- Olongapo, Philippines

== See also ==
- Bay Vista, Washington
- USS Bremerton, 2 ships
- Kennedy v. Bremerton School District, a 2022 Supreme Court case about religious prayer in schools
