= Manetti =

Manetti is an Italian surname. Notable people with the surname include:

- Antonio Manetti (1423–1497), Italian mathematician and architect
- Domenico Manetti (1609–1663), Italian painter
- Giannozzo Manetti (1396–1459), Italian politician and diplomat
- Larry Manetti (born 1947), American actor
- Ricardo Mannetti (born 1975), Namibian footballer
- Rutilio di Lorenzo Manetti, (c. 1571 – 1639), Italian painter
- Saverio Manetti (1723–1785), Italian physician, botanist and ornithologist
- Teresa Maria Manetti, (1846–1910), Italian Roman Catholic nun
