= Port Washington Narrows =

Tidal strait in Bremerton, Washington, U.S.

Coordinates: 47°35′3″N 122°38′51″W

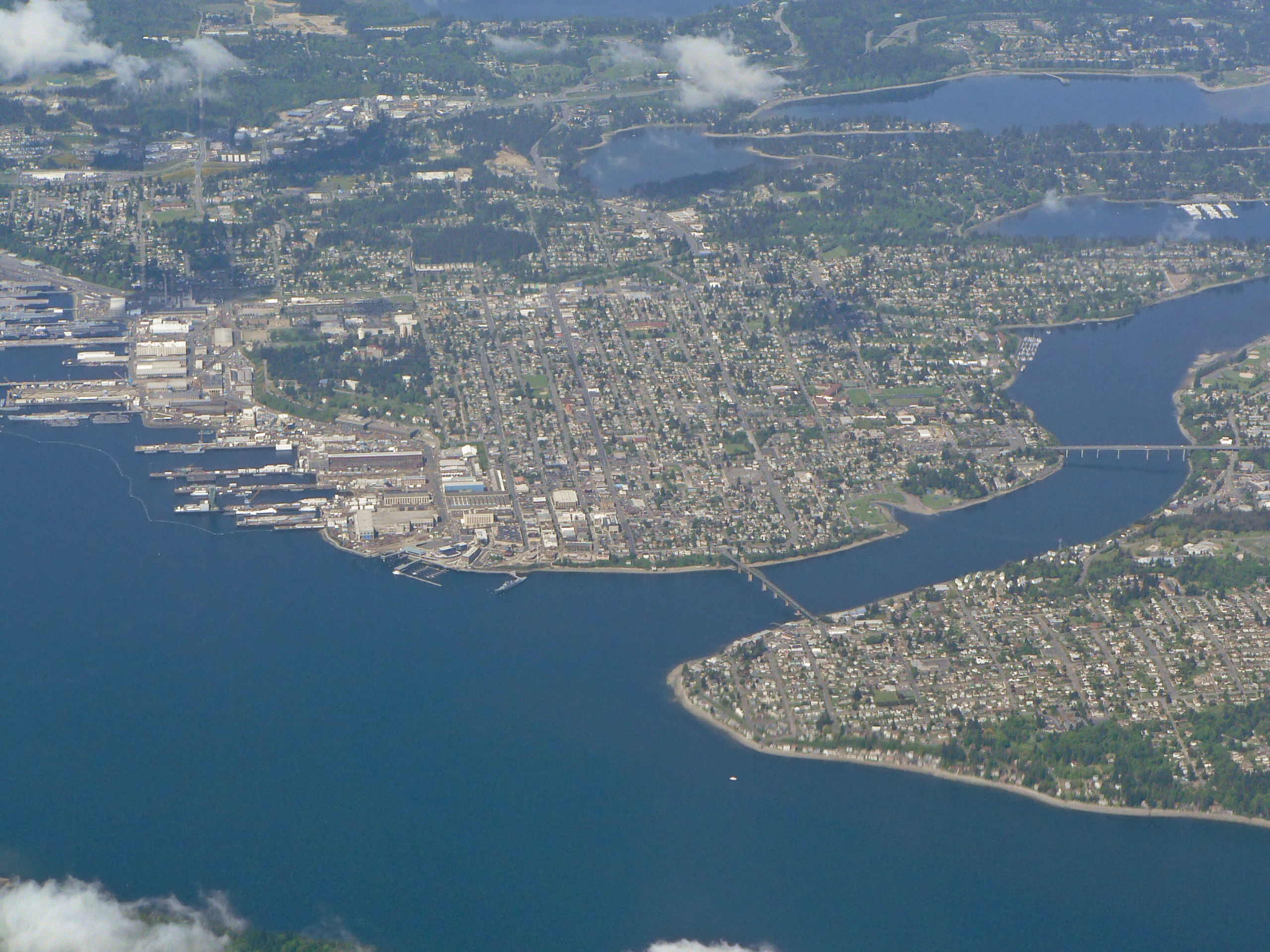
Sinclair Inlet and Puget Sound Naval Shipyard (left), Dyes Inlet (middle distance) and Manette and Warren Avenue Bridges (left to right) across Port Washington Narrows

The Port Washington Narrows is a tidal strait located in Bremerton, Washington, United States. The northwest entrance is marked on the west side by Rocky Point, and the southeast entrance is located between Point Turner on the west side and Point Herron on the east side. The Narrows divides downtown Bremerton from the Manette Peninsula.

It is through this 3-mile (5 km) channel that Dyes Inlet drains into Sinclair Inlet and into Puget Sound. Tidal currents attain velocities in excess of 4 knots at times.

The Port Washington Narrows divides the city of Bremerton into east and west portions, which are connected by the Manette Bridge and the Warren Avenue Bridge. There are a number of petroleum distribution facilities with storage tanks and receiving wharves along the western shore of the Narrows between the Manette Bridge and Phinney Bay.
