= Tracyton, Washington =

- Census-designated place
- Location of Tracyton, Washington
- Coordinates: 47°36′34″N 122°39′12″W
- Country: United States
- State: Washington
- County: Kitsap

Area
  - Total: 2.78 sq mi (7.21 km^{2})
  - Land: 1.92 sq mi (4.96 km^{2})
  - Water: 0.87 sq mi (2.25 km^{2})
- Elevation: 131 ft (40 m)

Population (2020)
  - Total: 5,967
  - Density: 3,120/sq mi (1,200/km^{2})
- Time zone: UTC-8 (Pacific (PST))
  - Summer (DST): UTC-7 (PDT)
- ZIP Code: 98393
- Area code(s): 360, 564
- FIPS code: 53-72205
- GNIS feature ID: 2409345

Tracyton is a census-designated place (CDP) in Kitsap County, Washington, United States. Its population was 5,967 at the 2020 census. It was named for 19th century Secretary of the Navy Benjamin F. Tracy.

== Geography ==
Tracyton is located in central Kitsap County on the east side of Dyes Inlet and is bordered to the south by the city of Bremerton.

According to the United States Census Bureau, the CDP has a total area of 2.8 square miles (7.2 km^{2}), of which 1.9 square miles (5.0 km^{2}) are land and 0.85 square miles (2.2 km^{2}), or 31.20%, are water.

== Demographics ==
Historical population
Census	Pop.	Note	%±
1980	2,304		—
1990	2,621		13.8%
2000	3,267		24.6%
2010	5,233		60.2%
2020	5,967		14.0%
U.S. Decennial Census; 1970 1980 1990; 2000 2010

As of the census of 2010, there were 5,233 people, 1,215 households, and 924 families residing in the CDP. The population density was 2,143.4 people per square mile (829.9/km^{2}). There were 1,288 housing units at an average density of 845.0/sq mi (327.2/km^{2}). The racial makeup of the CDP was 80.6% White, 3.7% African American, 0.7% Native American, 6.1% Asian, 1.0% Pacific Islander, 2.0% from other races, and 6.0% from two or more races. 3.6% of the population were Hispanic or Latino of any race.

There were 1,215 households, out of which 35.6% had children under the age of 18 living with them, 59.5% were married couples living together, 12.6% had a female householder with no husband present, and 23.9% were non-families. 18.3% of all households were made up of individuals, and 6.7% had someone living alone who was 65 years of age or older. The average household size was 2.69 and the average family size was 3.05.

In the CDP, the population was spread out, with 27.1% under the age of 18, 8.2% from 18 to 24, 28.0% from 25 to 44, 24.9% from 45 to 64, and 11.7% who were 65 years of age or older. The median age was 37 years. For every 100 females, there were 94.6 males. For every 100 females age 18 and over, there were 93.6 males.

The median income for a household in the CDP was $51,290, and the median income for a family was $56,935. Males had a median income of $43,445 versus $32,500 for females. The per capita income for the CDP was $21,234. 10.3% of the population and 7.8% of families were below the poverty line. Out of the total population, 18.4% of those under the age of 18 and 5.4% of those 65 and older were living below the poverty line.

== Education ==
The only school in Tracyton is a Harbor Montessori School campus, which is a member of the American Montessori Society.
