= Dyes Inlet =

Coordinates: 47.611718°N 122.682610°W

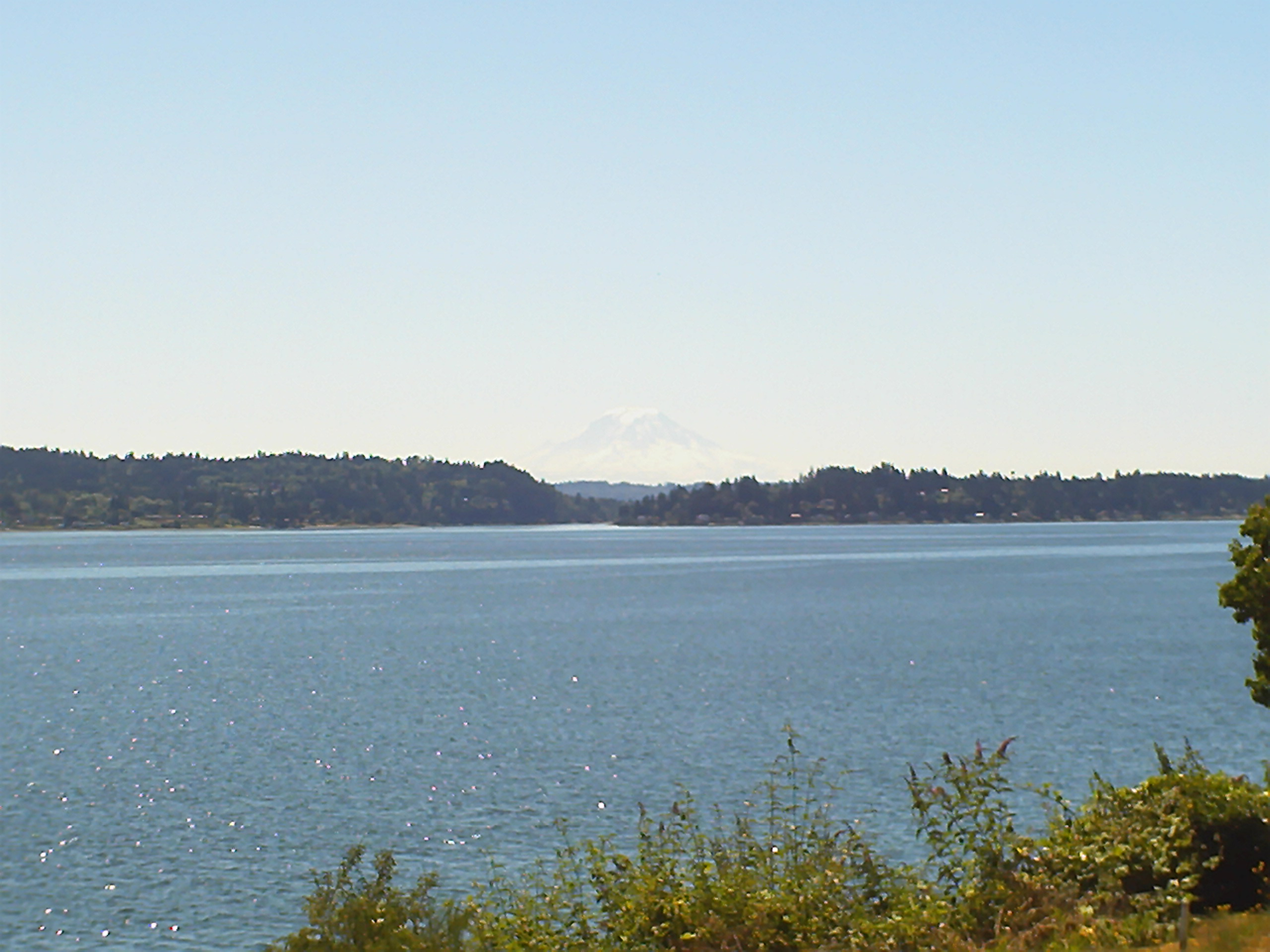
Dyes Inlet. View facing southeast with Mount Rainier in background

Dyes Inlet is an inlet on the Kitsap Peninsula in western Washington, USA. The unincorporated Silverdale community is located on the north shore of the inlet and has a small marina, boat ramp, boardwalk, and two waterfront parks. The west shoreline rests on Chico, and the east shoreline is Tracyton, both census-designated places. Dyes Inlet is connected to the strait of Port Orchard via the Port Washington Narrows, Port Washington being an earlier name for the inlet. It was named for John W. W. Dyes, a taxidermist with the Wilkes Expedition of 1841. Chico Creek and Clear Creek are the major fresh waterways that drain into the inlet. Both creeks have heavy salmon runs during the fall.

Dyes Inlet has hosted Unlimited Light Hydroplane races, and historically held bathtub races in the 1960s. The inlet is also referenced in Death Cab for Cutie's song 'Northern Lights' on their ninth studio album Thank You for Today.
