= Gordon Elementary School =

Gordon Elementary School can refer to:

- California
  - Gordon Elementary School in Fairfield, California – Fairfield-Suisun Unified School District
- Illinois
  - John Gordon Elementary School in Posen, Illinois – Posen-Robbins School District 143½
- Michigan
  - Gordon Elementary School in Marshall, Michigan – Marshall Public Schools
- New Jersey
  - Robert Gordon Elementary School in Roselle Park, New Jersey – Roselle Park School District
- North Carolina
  - Gordon Elementary School in Cameron, North Carolina (Fort Bragg) – U.S. Department of Defense Education Activity
- South Carolina
  - Gordon Elementary School in Dillon, South Carolina – Dillon School District Four
  - Rudolph Gordon Elementary School in Simpsonville, South Carolina – Greenville County Schools
- Tennessee
  - Gordon Elementary School in Memphis, Tennessee – Memphis City Schools
- Texas
  - Maud W. Gordon Elementary School (now the Mandarin Chinese Language Immersion Magnet School) in Bellaire, Texas (Greater Houston) – Houston Independent School District
- Virginia
  - W. W. Gordon Elementary School near Richmond, Virginia – Chesterfield County Public Schools
- Washington
  - Richard Gordon Elementary School in Kingston, Washington – North Kitsap School District
