= Dixie Highway =

Historic highway in the United States

Dixie Highway
- Chicago–Miami Expressway; Canada–Miami Expressway; Macon–Jacksonville Expressway
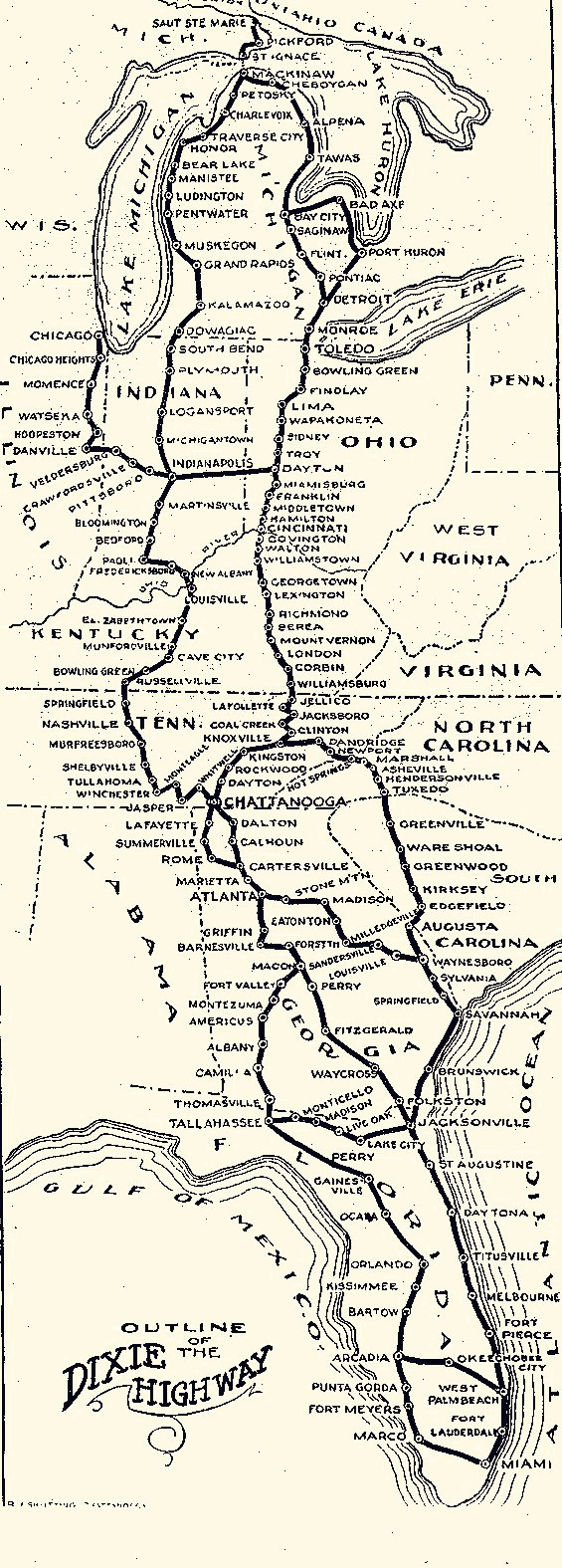

Route information
- Length: 5,786 mi (9,312 km)
- Existed: 1915–present

Western division
- North end: Chicago, Illinois
- South end: Miami, Florida

Eastern division
- North end: Sault Ste. Marie, Michigan
- South end: Miami, Florida

Central division
- North end: Macon, Georgia
- South end: Jacksonville, Florida

Location
- Country: United States
- States: Michigan, Illinois, Indiana, Ohio, Kentucky, Tennessee, North Carolina, Georgia, South Carolina, Florida

Highway system
- Auto trails

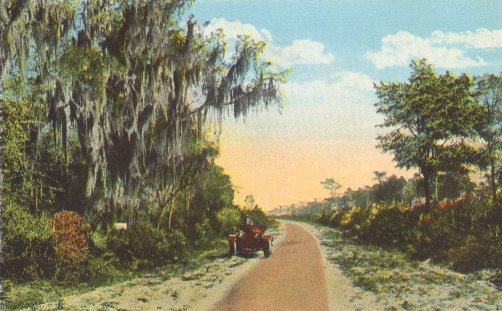
Postcard image of Dixie Highway in St. Johns County, Florida. This section was previously part of the older John Anderson Highway.

Dixie Highway was a United States auto trail first planned in 1914 to connect the Midwest with the South. It was part of a system and was expanded from an earlier Miami to Montreal highway. The final system is better understood as a network of connected paved roads, rather than one single highway. It was constructed and expanded from 1915 to 1929.

The Dixie Highway was inspired by the example of the slightly earlier Lincoln Highway, the first road across the United States. The prime booster of both projects was promoter and businessman Carl G. Fisher. It was overseen by the Dixie Highway Association and funded by a group of individuals, businesses, local governments, and states. In the early years, the U.S. federal government played little role, but from the early 1920s on it provided increasing funding until 1927. That year the Dixie Highway Association was disbanded and the highway was taken over by the federal government as part of the U.S. Route system, with some portions becoming state roads.

The route was marked by a red stripe with the white letters "DH", usually with a white stripe above and below. The logo was commonly painted on utility poles.

== Route description ==
The Western route connected Chicago and Miami, via Danville, Illinois; Indianapolis and Bedford in Indiana; Louisville, Elizabethtown, and Bowling Green in Kentucky; Nashville and Chattanooga in Tennessee; Atlanta, Macon, and Albany in Georgia; and Tallahassee, Gainesville, Orlando, Arcadia, and Naples in Florida.

Except for realignments made since the 1920s, the western route is now Illinois Route 1 and U.S. Route 136 to Indianapolis, Indiana State Road 37 and U.S. Route 150 to Louisville, U.S. Route 31W, U.S. Route 68, and U.S. Route 431 to Nashville, and U.S. Route 41, U.S. Route 231, U.S. Route 41A, and U.S. Route 41 to Chattanooga. At Chattanooga, the western and eastern routes intersected; the western took a longer route along U.S. Route 27 to Rome and then returned to U.S. Route 41 at Cartersville via U.S. Route 411. At Atlanta, the eastern route split off toward Madison, Georgia, with the western continuing to Macon along the present U.S. Route 41; then Georgia State Route 49, U.S. Route 19, and U.S. Route 319 to Tallahassee; U.S. Route 27 and U.S. Route 441 to Orlando; and U.S. Route 17 and U.S. Route 41 (over Tamiami Trail) to Miami.

The Eastern route connected Sault Ste. Marie, Michigan, with Miami, running via Saginaw and Detroit in Michigan; Toledo, Bowling Green, Lima, Dayton, and Cincinnati in Ohio; Lexington in Kentucky; Knoxville and Chattanooga in Tennessee; Atlanta and Savannah in Georgia; and Jacksonville and West Palm Beach in Florida.

The Dixie Highway magazine, containing stories of road development from Michigan to Florida, c. 1925

In Michigan's Upper Peninsula, the highway followed what is now M-129 from Sault Ste. Marie to Pickford and then west to follow a short portion of former U.S. Route 2, replaced by Mackinac Trail. It crossed the Straits of Mackinac and then used what is now U.S. Route 23 and old U.S. Route 10 to Detroit. It still exists in Michigan as the name of a secondary road from Saginaw southeast to the county line (as an alternate route to Flint), from southeast Flint to northwest Pontiac, and from Flat Rock southwest to Monroe, ending at the state line. A short section of the Dixie Highway in northwest lower Michigan running north from Eastport in Antrim County to the village of Norwood in Charlevoix County is named Old Dixie Highway—U.S. Route 31 parallels this road to the east. In Ohio, it was old U.S. Route 25 to Cincinnati, current U.S. Route 25 and U.S. Route 25W to Knoxville, and U.S. Route 70 and U.S. Route 27 to Chattanooga. The eastern division took a more direct route than the western between Chattanooga and Atlanta, following the modern U.S. Route 41 all the way, but it followed a more circuitous path south of Atlanta. Traffic left Atlanta to the east on U.S. Route 278, following U.S. Route 441, Georgia State Route 24, a short section of U.S. Route 301, and Georgia State Route 21 to Savannah. There, the route turned south along the coast via U.S. Route 17 to Jacksonville and U.S. Route 1 to Miami. It is today (2016) a major street in towns and cities along the Florida East Coast.

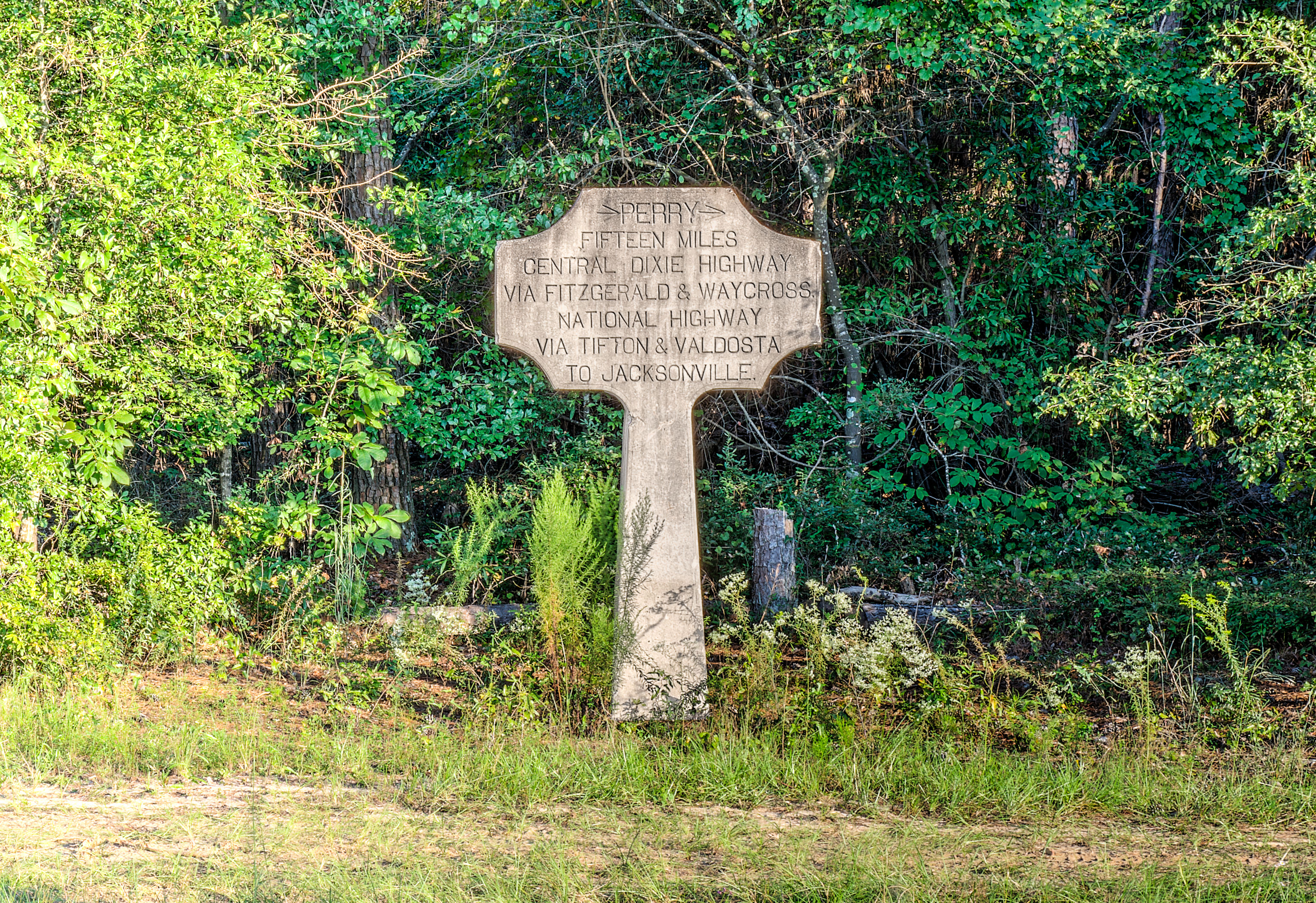
A stone Dixie Highway marker along US 41 in Houston County

The Central route was a short cutoff between the western division at Macon, Georgia, and the eastern route at Jacksonville, Florida, forming a shorter route to Miami than the western on its own; it followed U.S. Route 41, U.S. Route 341, U.S. Route 129, Georgia State Route 32, and U.S. Route 1.

The Carolina route cut the distance between Knoxville and Waynesboro, Georgia, on the eastern route. It is now U.S. Route 25W and U.S. Route 25, and passes through Asheville, Greenville, and Augusta on its way to the eastern route and Savannah.

== History ==
The Dixie Highway, an idea of Carl G. Fisher of the Lincoln Highway Association, was organized in early December 1914 in Chattanooga. On April 3, 1915, governors of the interested states met at Chattanooga, and each selected two commissioners to lay out the route from Chicago to Miami. On May 22, 1915, the commission decided on a split route in order to serve more communities.

The route left Chicago to the south via Danville, Illinois, and turned east to Indianapolis, where it split. The west branch headed south through Tennessee via Louisville and Nashville to Chattanooga, Tennessee, while the east route went east from Indianapolis to Dayton, Ohio, before turning south via Cincinnati; Lexington, Kentucky; and Knoxville, Tennessee; to Chattanooga. Two alternate routes were included between Chattanooga and Atlanta, and again between Atlanta and Macon, Georgia. Finally, between Macon and Jacksonville, Florida, the west route went south to Tallahassee, Florida, before turning east, while the east route had yet to be defined in detail. From Jacksonville, the route followed the east coast south to Miami, along the John Anderson Highway.

The commission voted to invite Michigan to the project, and to extend a branch of the east route from Dayton north to Detroit via Toledo. It also studied a loop around Lake Michigan and a western route between Tallahassee and Miami.

Within a week, Michigan agreed to construct a loop around the Lower Peninsula, passing via Toledo, Ohio; South Bend, Indiana; Mackinaw City, Michigan; and Detroit. Detroit became the northern end of the eastern division, with the old route to Indianapolis becoming a connecting link.

In early April 1916, the commission approved the route between Macon and Jacksonville via Savannah, Georgia, and designated the more direct route via Waycross, Georgia, as the central division. At the urging of locals, the eastern division was realigned to a more direct path northwest from Milledgeville, Georgia, to Atlanta over the "Old Capitol Route", bypassing Macon. The old eastern division via McDonough, Jackson, and Macon was removed from the system in early July 1916.

By early 1917, the western division had been modified in Florida to go southeast from Tallahassee via Kissimmee and Bartow to the eastern division at Jupiter; the old Tallahassee–Jacksonville route became another connection. The Carolina division, connecting to the eastern division at Knoxville, Tennessee, and Waynesboro, Georgia, was approved in mid-May 1918. By mid-1919, a short piece on Michigan's Upper Peninsula to Sault Ste. Marie, became part of the eastern division of the highway, which was extended north from Detroit to Mackinaw City and across the Straits of Mackinac.

Construction of various sections was done by convict laborers.

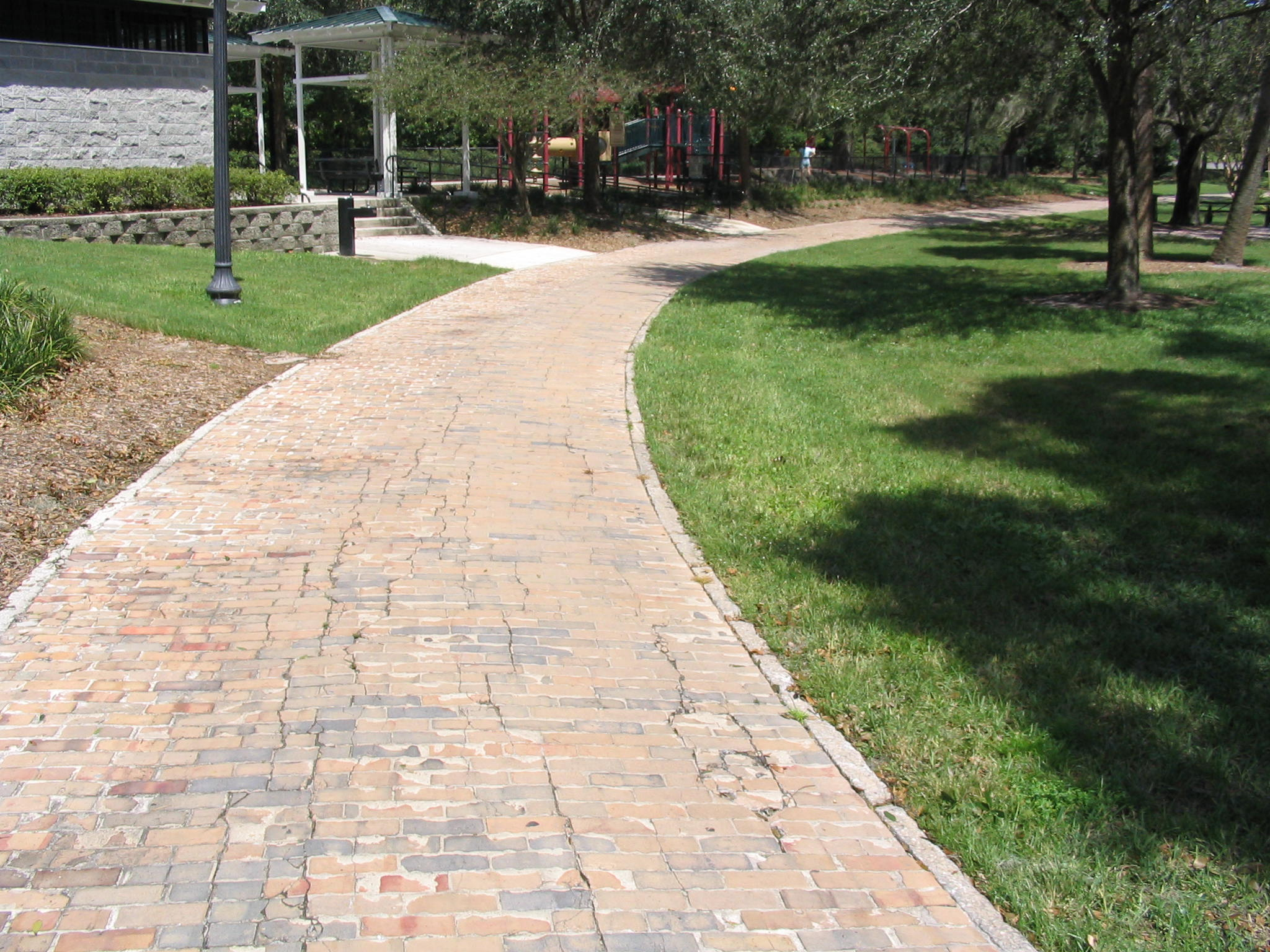
Brick section of the Dixie Highway

=== After establishment of U.S. Highway System ===
- Dixie Highway-Hastings, Espanola and Bunnell Road
- U.S. National Register of Historic Places
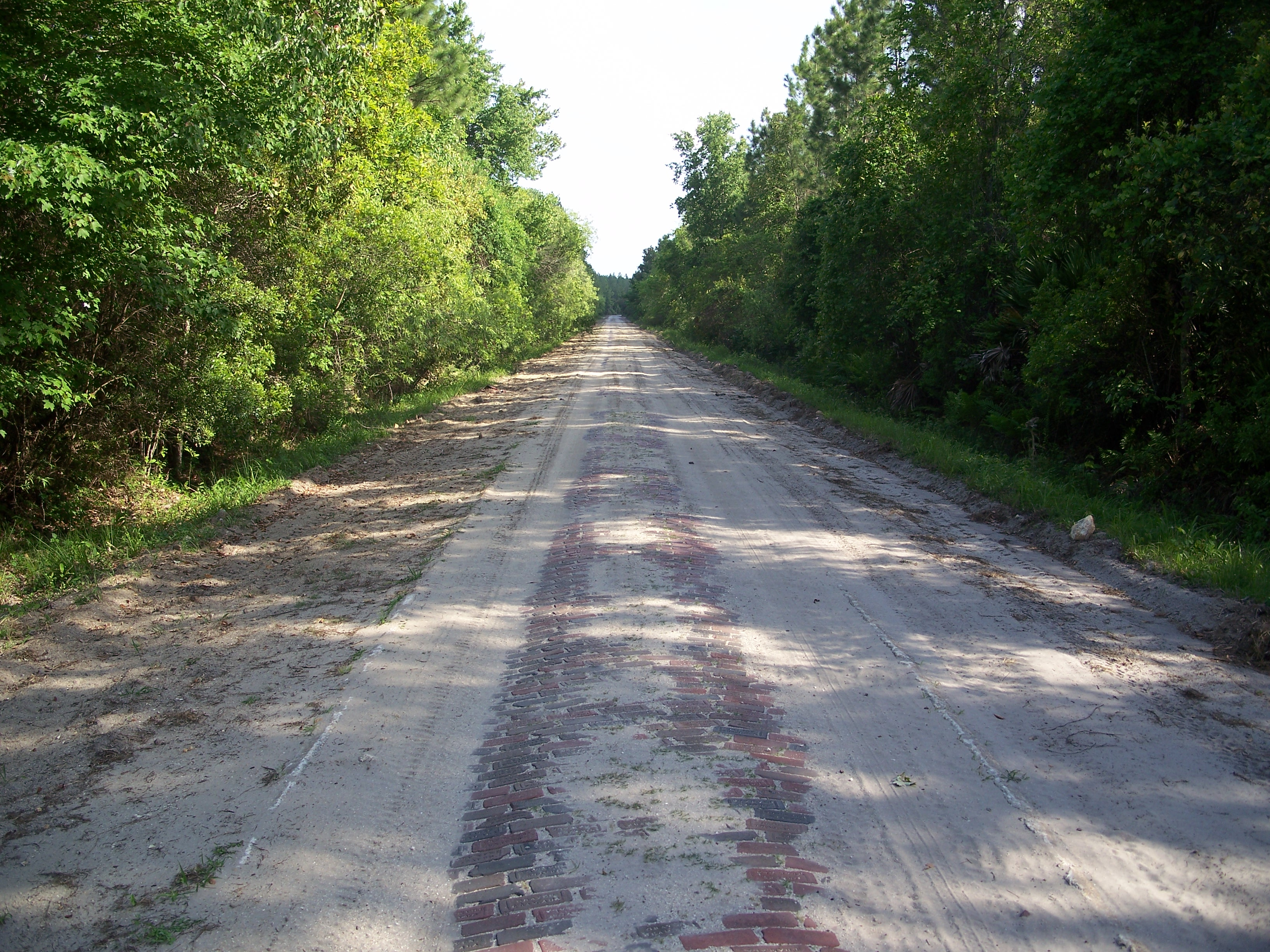

- Location within Florida Location within the United States
- Location: Flagler and St. Johns counties, Florida, USA
- Nearest city: Hastings and Espanola
- Coordinates: 29°34′49″N 81°20′35″W
- Area: 72.7 acres (29.4 ha)
- Built: 1916
- Architect: Wilson, James Y.; McCrary Engineering Company
- NRHP reference No.: 05000311
- Added to NRHP: April 20, 2005

Much of the eastern route—and all the Carolina route—became U.S. Route 25. Then the primary eastern route (Knoxville to Macon) was largely paralleled and in some sections replaced by Interstate 75, which runs from Miami to Sault Ste. Marie. Large portions of the former US 25 in western Ohio became known (after Interstate 75's completion in that area in 1963) by various names, including County Road 25A, Dixie Drive, Dixie Highway, Cincinnati-Dayton Road, and, through Dayton, Patterson Boulevard and Keowee Street. A four-lane portion runs between Cygnet and Toledo, through Bowling Green, as Ohio State Route 25. In Michigan, M-25 from Port Huron to Bay City incorporates the segment of old US 25 that Interstates 75 and 94 did not supplant as a through route. The eastern portion from Jacksonville south was largely replaced with U.S. Route 1.

The portion of the western route from Nashville, Tennessee, north to Louisville, Kentucky is now U.S. Highway 31W. In most of the cities it traverses in Kentucky, it is still referred to as "Dixie Highway" or "Dixie Avenue". The western route generally follows the present-day route of US 150, Indiana SR 37, and Indiana SR 67 from Louisville to Indianapolis. From Nashville to Indianapolis, the route parallels Interstate 65. Portions of this stretch were originally parts of the Louisville and Nashville Turnpike, which began construction in the 1830s.

U.S. Route 1 is named Dixie Highway from the national southern terminus of Interstate 95 in Miami to the Overseas Highway in Key Largo, Florida. The name "Dixie Highway" persists in various locations along its route where the main flow of long-distance traffic has been rerouted to newer highways and the old Dixie Highway remains as a local road. In some south Florida cities, Dixie Highway (or sometimes Old Dixie Highway) parallels "Federal Highway" (U.S. Route 1), sometimes just a block away. In Tennessee, the name lives on in Dixie Lee Junction (where Dixie Highway and Lee Highway intersected). In western North Carolina, seven bronze plaques on granite pillars were placed by the United Daughters of the Confederacy in the late 1920s to mark the route (which today follows US 25) of the Dixie Highway and honor General Robert E. Lee. These markers could be found in the towns of Hot Springs, Marshall, Asheville, Fletcher, and Hendersonville, and on the South Carolina and Tennessee state lines; an eighth monument of identical type can be found on US 25 in downtown Greenville, South Carolina. Two additional monuments could be found in Franklin, Ohio at the intersection of the Old Dixie Highway and Hamilton-Middletown Road, and near Bradfordville, Florida, on US 319. Markers in Hot Springs, Marshall, and Tuxedo were stolen. Markers in Asheville and Franklin were removed by local governments. In 2022 Calvary Episcopal Church in Fletcher returned the marker in front of the church to the local chapter of the United Daughters of the Confederacy. The name Dixie Highway is also still commonly used in portions of Michigan's Lower Peninsula, such as in the Waterford area, where it is a major thoroughfare known as U.S. Route 24.

Dixie Highway retains its name running south from Chicago through the towns of Posen, Harvey, and Homewood to the town of Chicago Heights. Here it joins Illinois Route 1, which runs contiguous with the old Dixie Highway's original course.

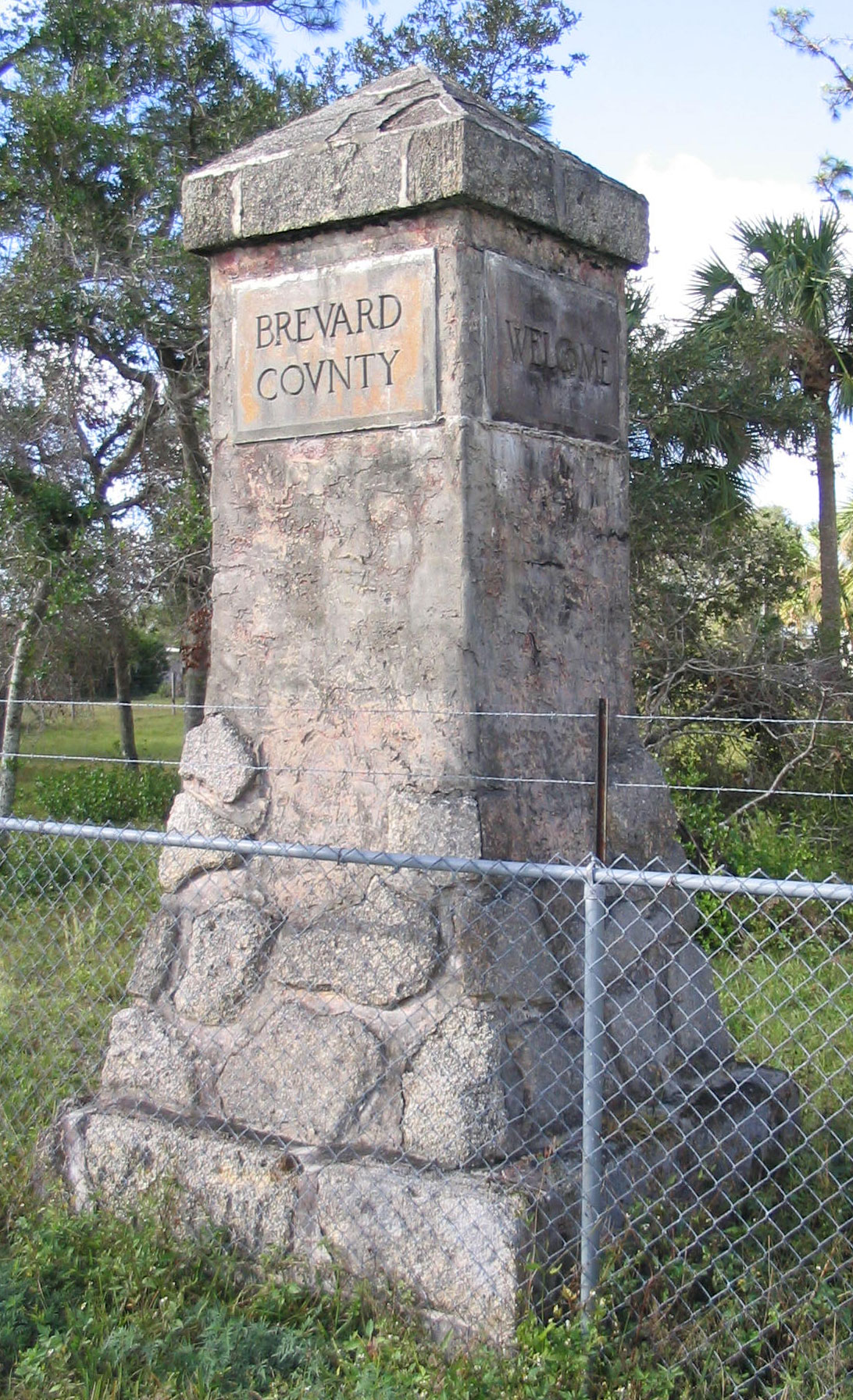
Monuments like this, and even arches over the roadway, were put up by cities and counties as they built sections of highways including the Dixie Highway. This one is in Scottsmoor, Florida.

In Indiana, the only portion of the Highway that retains its name is located in southwestern Bedford, although Roseland names its section Dixie Way. Indiana State Road 37 in southern Indiana and US 31 in northern Indiana were once part of the Dixie Highway system. A detailed 1915 map of the Dixie Highway route through Indiana and other states was generated by the National Highways Association. At least a portion of the Dixie Highway in Indiana was paved with brick, although some portions used continuous concrete (meaning no expansion joints). The state has not forgotten the crucial part that entrepreneur and native son Carl G. Fisher played in the development of the Dixie Highway nor the importance of the Dixie Highway itself.

In some cities and towns, Dixie Highway is the north–south axis of the street numbering system. Also, the route of Dixie Highway generally parallels the coast, often running diagonally instead of straight north and south, causing irregularities in the numbering system.

The Dixie Highway-Hastings, Espanola and Bunnell Road (also known as County Road 13 or the Old Brick Road) is a historic section of Old Dixie Highway in Florida. It is located roughly between Espanola (in Flagler County) and CR 204 southeast of Hastings near Flagler Estates (in St. Johns County). This is one of the few extant portions of the original brick Dixie Highway left in Florida. On April 20, 2005, it was added to the U.S. National Register of Historic Places. Maitland, Florida, is also home to a brick section of the Dixie Highway stretching around Lake Lily. In Hobe Sound, Florida development centers on Dixie Highway, and historic lampposts dating to around 1925 are present along the route.

There is also a small section of the original brick Dixie Highway, and a monument marking the county line, near Loughman, Florida, on the Osceola County/Polk County border.

A segment of Dixie Highway remains as an arterial street in Hallandale Beach, Florida. The name is mired in controversy due to its antebellum connotation, which some say glorifies the nation's racist history of slavery, and "upholds the history of the Confederacy". A portion of US 1 named Dixie Highway in Coral Gables, Florida, has been given the historical designation of "Harriet Tubman Highway" on brown designation signs, but any change to the official road name requires state approval.

== See also ==
- Dixie Square Mall
- Dixie Overland Highway (Atlantic to Pacific)
- Florida tourism industry
- Florida East Coast Railway
