= North Kitsap High School =

Location
- 1780 NE Hostmark Street; Poulsbo, Washington; United States

Information
- Type: Public high school
- Established: 1924
- School district: North Kitsap School District
- Principal: James Sellers
- Teaching staff: 44.06 (FTE) (2023-24)
- Grades: 9–12
- Enrollment: 1,112 (2024-25)
- Student to teacher ratio: 24.90 (2023-24)
- Colors: Purple and Gold
- Mascot: Viking
- Yearbook: The Viking
- Website: nkhs.nkschools.org

North Kitsap High School (NKHS) is a public four-year high school located in Poulsbo, Washington, United States. It serves the northern portion of Kitsap County as part of the North Kitsap School District 400. The school enrolls over 1,100 students in grades 9 through 12. NKHS was established in 1941 as the successor to earlier high schools serving Poulsbo.

The school offers a wide array of academic programs and student clubs. The campus underwent significant renovations completed in 2009, enhancing its facilities. Among its notable alumni is astronaut Richard F. Gordon Jr., who served as command module pilot for Apollo 12. The school's athletic teams are known as the Vikings.

== History ==
High school classes in Poulsbo were first offered in the area as early as 1907. An earlier school was built in 1891 on land donated by John Tornensis; an existing one-room schoolhouse had been built by an earlier property owner. The first class of students at Poulsbo High School graduated in 1920. It was succeeded the following year by Union High School, which initially served students from five local school districts. It later grew to serve fourteen districts by 1929. In 1941, the fourteen districts who contracted with Union High School were consolidated to form the North Kitsap School District; Union High School was renamed to North Kitsap High School as a result.

The high school campus underwent significant renovations in 2009 to modernize facilities as part of a $100 million district-wide capital program. The initial phase, costing $8.8 million, replaced the 100 Building and the gymnasium. The main, final phase of the NKHS renovation cost $21.4 million and included a redesigned main office and school entryway, an upgraded heating and cooling system, and a modernized commons area with an outdoor courtyard.

=== Incidents ===
On October 28, 2014, A 16-year-old student was arrested after allegedly threatening to shoot up the school and claiming to have a hit list of fellow students he planned to target. Police, who considered the threat credible, searched the student's home and found a handgun, shotgun, and long rifle that were accessible to him. The school district notified parents and staff, and a police presence was on campus following the incident.

Michael Paul Carnegie, a former Spanish and driver's education teacher at North Kitsap High School, was involved in a sexual misconduct incident with a 17-year-old female student in 2014. In 2017, he pleaded guilty to fourth-degree assault with sexual motivation, served jail time, and was no longer employed by the district.

On May 2, 2017, North Kitsap High School, along with Poulsbo Middle School and Poulsbo Elementary School, were placed on lockdown for nearly two hours after a caller reported seeing someone walking near the high school with what appeared to be a rifle. Police investigated but were unable to substantiate the report. Law enforcement maintained a presence on campus for the remainder of the school day as a precaution.

On February 7, 2022, a North Kitsap School District bus was involved in a crash with a tree service utility truck in Poulsbo. The bus driver sustained serious injuries and was entrapped, while three students on board were able to disembark safely, were evaluated as a precaution, and returned to their families. A worker from the truck also sustained minor injuries.

== Campus and Community ==
North Kitsap High School is in Poulsbo and serves nearby communities in northern Kitsap County. The high school campus includes the North Kitsap Community Auditorium, a 600-seat venue for the performing arts and public meetings. A major renovation in 2009 comprised the construction of a new cafeteria, a redesigned main office and entryway, and an improved commons area that opens onto a courtyard. The Odin Inn, a student-operated restaurant run as part of the Culinary Arts CTE program, is located next to the North Kitsap Community Pool.

== Academics ==
The school provides a comprehensive curriculum that includes core academic subjects, Advanced Placement and college preparatory courses, and extracurricular opportunities. To graduate from North Kitsap High School, students must earn a total of 24 credits, fulfill non-credit requirements, and meet specific pathway requirements. Non-credit requirements include the completion of a High School and Beyond Plan, a personalized plan focused on future career and educational goals, and Washington State History, which is typically completed in the middle school.

NKHS has several career and technical education programs. The culinary arts program operates Odin Inn, a student-run, fully licensed restaurant located adjacent to the North Kitsap Community Pool. The school also sponsors Running Start students at Olympic College.

== Athletics ==
The North Kitsap High School athletic program, named the Vikings, is a member of the Olympic League and the Washington Interscholastic Activities Association. Some Vikings sporting events are broadcast live on Hudl.

== Student programs ==
The NKHS band program comprises a concert band, symphonic band, wind ensemble, percussion ensemble, orchestra, and jazz ensemble. A non-profit booster club provides support to the bands through fundraising events and organized performances. Among these events is the annual Viking Jazz Festival, which hosts middle and high school jazz bands from Western Washington at the North Kitsap Community Auditorium.

Other programs at the school include choir, drama, and visual arts.

== Demographics ==
In the 2024-2025 school year, 50.3% of the students at NKHS were male, 48.9% were female, and 0.8% were Gender X. 1.1% were Native American, 5.9% were Asian, 0.4% were Native Hawaiian/Other Pacific Islander, 18.3% were Hispanic/Latino, 1.6% were Black/African American, 63.2% were White, and 9.4% were Two or More Races.

== Notable alumni ==
- Richard F. Gordon, American astronaut and Apollo 12 pilot.
