= Kingston High School (Washington) =

Coordinates: 47°47′53″N 122°31′01″W

Location
- 26201 Siyaya Ave NE; Kingston, Washington; United States

Information
- Type: Public secondary
- Established: 2007
- School district: North Kitsap School District
- Principal: Craig Brewster
- Vice Principal: Philip Mackey-Moseley
- Teaching staff: 26.35 (FTE)
- Grades: 9–12
- Enrollment: 602 (2024–2025)
- Student to teacher ratio: 22.85
- Colors: Crimson & Gold
- Mascot: Buccaneer
- Rival: North Kitsap High School
- National ranking: 5,359
- Website: khs.nkschools.org

Kingston High School is a secondary school located in Kingston, Washington. It is one of two secondary schools in the North Kitsap School District. KHS educates grades 9–12. The school is located on the same site as the North Kitsap school bus barn and Spectrum Community School.

== Demographics ==
In the 2020-2021 school year, 52.4% of the students at KHS are male and 47.6% of the students are female, 8.3% are Native American, 2.8% are Asian, 1.0% are Pacific Islander, 15.2% are Hispanic, 1.0% are Black, 11.0% are of mixed race, and 60.7% are White. The school has 46 classroom teachers, providing a teacher-to-student ratio of 1:20 (based on 2011 enrollment and staffing).

== Athletic programs ==
KHS offers 19 athletic programs: Baseball, Boys' Basketball, Fastpitch, Girls' Basketball, Cheer, Cross Country, Football, Boys' Golf, Girls' Golf, Gymnastics, Boys' Soccer, Girls' Soccer, Boys' Swimming, Girls' Swimming, Boys' Tennis, Girls' Tennis, Track & Field, Volleyball, Wrestling, and debate. In the 2010–2011 academic year, 14 of these teams won WIAA Scholastic awards.

== Site history ==
Between 1954 and 1975 the property was the site of the Nike Missile Launch Site #92 which contained two missile magazines, support buildings, and barracks. The US military has not disclosed if nuclear weapons were ever located on the site. Due to public concerns about potential effects of suspected contaminants at the site, investigations and testing of the site were undertaken in 2003-2004 by the US Environmental Protection Agency and the Washington State Department of Health (DOH), in cooperation with the Agency for Toxic Substances and Disease Registry (ATSDR). The testing found that radiation is not present above natural background levels. The agencies concluded that exposure to the soil and drinking water posed no current or future health hazards and found no significant elevations in occurrences of cancer incidence in the area.

== Facility ==
The school opened in 2007 in a new 113,000 square foot facility organized around four internal learning neighborhoods. Architects for the project were Bassetti Architects of Seattle.

In 2011, a 47 kW photovoltaic solar panel system was installed on the roof of the school. The panels were installed by a private sector company which rents the rooftop space from, and sells the electricity generated to, the school district at the same rate as is currently being charged by the utility company. After 10 years, ownership of the panels and the electricity generated is to be transferred to the school district.

== See also ==
- List of Nike missile locations
- Education in the United States
