= Richard F. Gordon Jr. =

American astronaut (1929–2017)

Dick Gordon
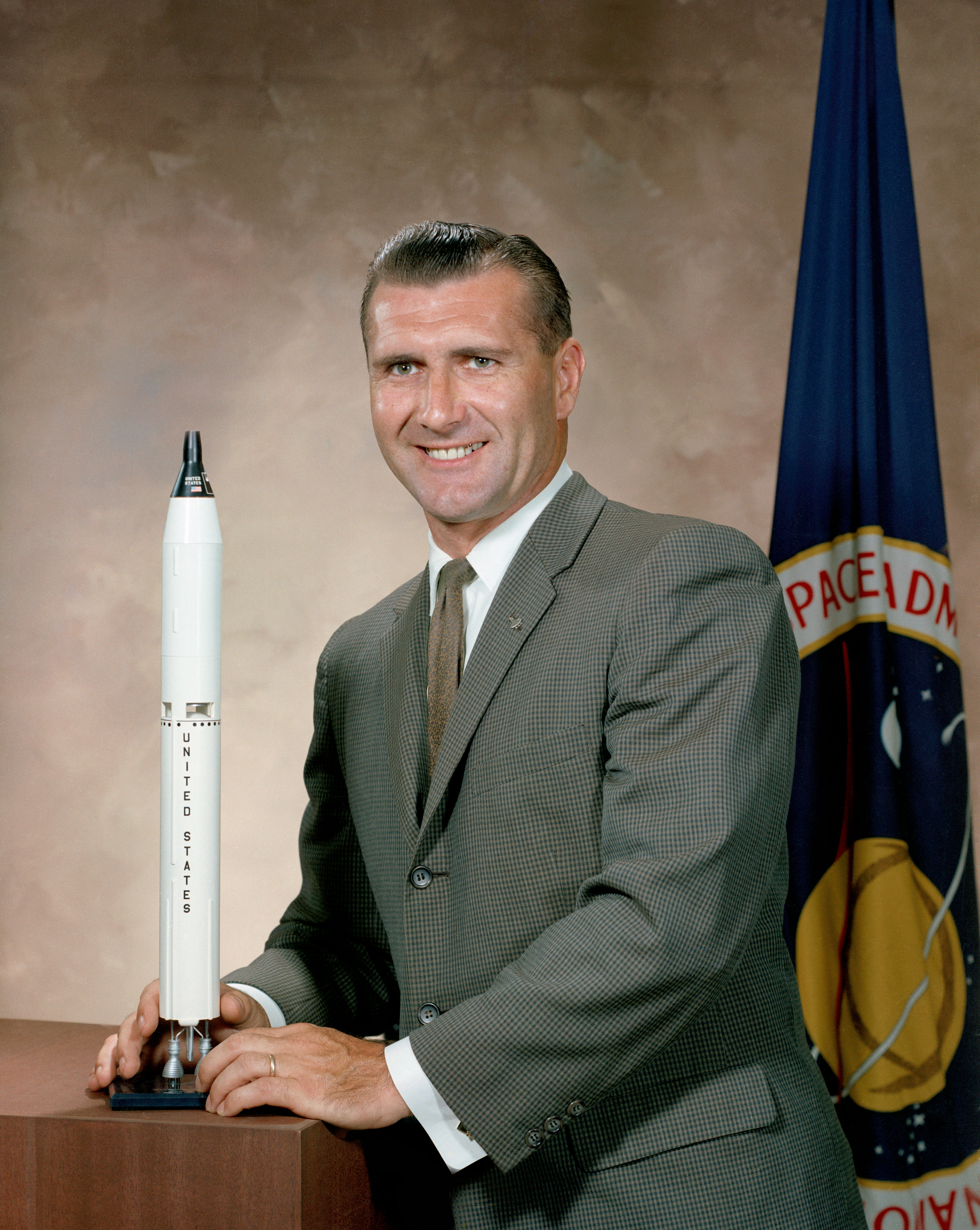
- Gordon in 1964
- Born: Richard Francis Gordon Jr. October 5, 1929; Seattle, Washington, U.S.
- Died: November 6, 2017 (aged 88); San Marcos, California, U.S.
- Resting place: Arlington National Cemetery
- Education: University of Washington (BS); Naval Postgraduate School
- Spouse(s): Barbara Field (m. 1953, divorced) Linda Saunders (m. 1983; died 2017)
- Children: 6
- Awards: Distinguished Flying Cross (2); Distinguished Service Medal; NASA Distinguished Service Medal; NASA Exceptional Service Medal
- Space career

NASA astronaut
- Rank: Captain, USN
- Time in space: 13d 3h 53m
- Selection: NASA Group 3 (1963)
- Total EVAs: 2
- Total EVA time: 2h 41m
- Mission: Gemini 11; Apollo 12
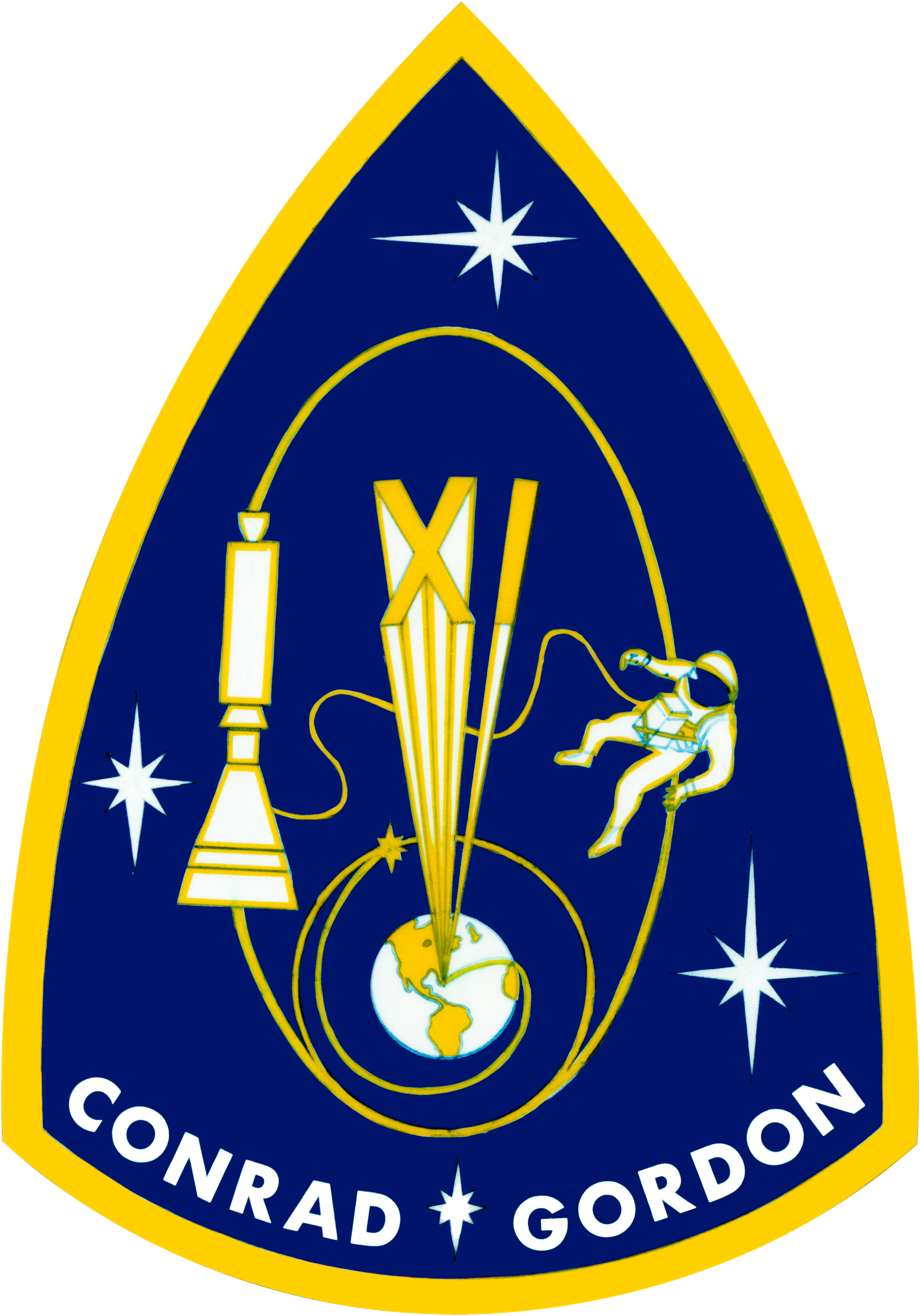
- Mission insignia
- Retired: January 1, 1972

Richard Francis Gordon Jr. (October 5, 1929 – November 6, 2017) was an American naval officer and aviator, test pilot, and NASA astronaut, and a football executive. He was one of 24 Apollo astronauts to reach the Moon, as command module pilot of the Apollo 12 mission, which orbited the Moon 45 times. Gordon had already flown in space as the pilot of the 1966 Gemini 11 mission.

== Biography ==
=== Early life and education ===
Gordon was born in Seattle, Washington, on October 5, 1929, the first of five children of Richard Francis Gordon Sr., a machinist, and his wife, Angela Frances Gordon (née Sullivan), an elementary school teacher. He was a Boy Scout, and earned the rank of Star Scout. He graduated from North Kitsap High School in Poulsbo, Washington, in 1947, then entered the University of Washington, from where he received a Bachelor of Science degree in chemistry in 1951 and he was also a member of Phi Sigma Kappa.

=== Naval career ===
After graduating from college, Gordon joined the United States Navy and received his wings as a Naval Aviator in 1953. He then attended All-Weather Flight School and jet transitional training, and was subsequently assigned to an all-weather fighter squadron at Naval Air Station Jacksonville, Florida.

In 1957, he attended the United States Naval Test Pilot School at Naval Air Station Patuxent River, Maryland, and served as a flight test pilot until 1960. During this tour of duty, he did flight test work on the F-8U Crusader, F-11F Tiger, North American FJ Fury, and A-4D Skyhawk, and was the first project test pilot for the F4H-1 Phantom II. He served with Fighter Squadron 121 (VF-121) at the Naval Air Station Miramar, California], as a flight instructor in the F4H-1 and participated in the introduction of that aircraft to the Atlantic and Pacific Fleets. He was also flight safety officer, assistant operations officer, and ground training officer for Fighter Squadron 96 (VF-96) at Miramar. He logged more than 4,500 hours of flying time with 3,500 hours of those hours in jet aircraft. He was also a student at the U.S. Naval Postgraduate School at Monterey, California.

He won the Bendix Trophy race from Los Angeles to New York City in May 1961, flying an F4H-1 in which he established a new speed record of 869.74 miles per hour and a transcontinental speed record of 2 hours and 47 minutes.

=== NASA career ===
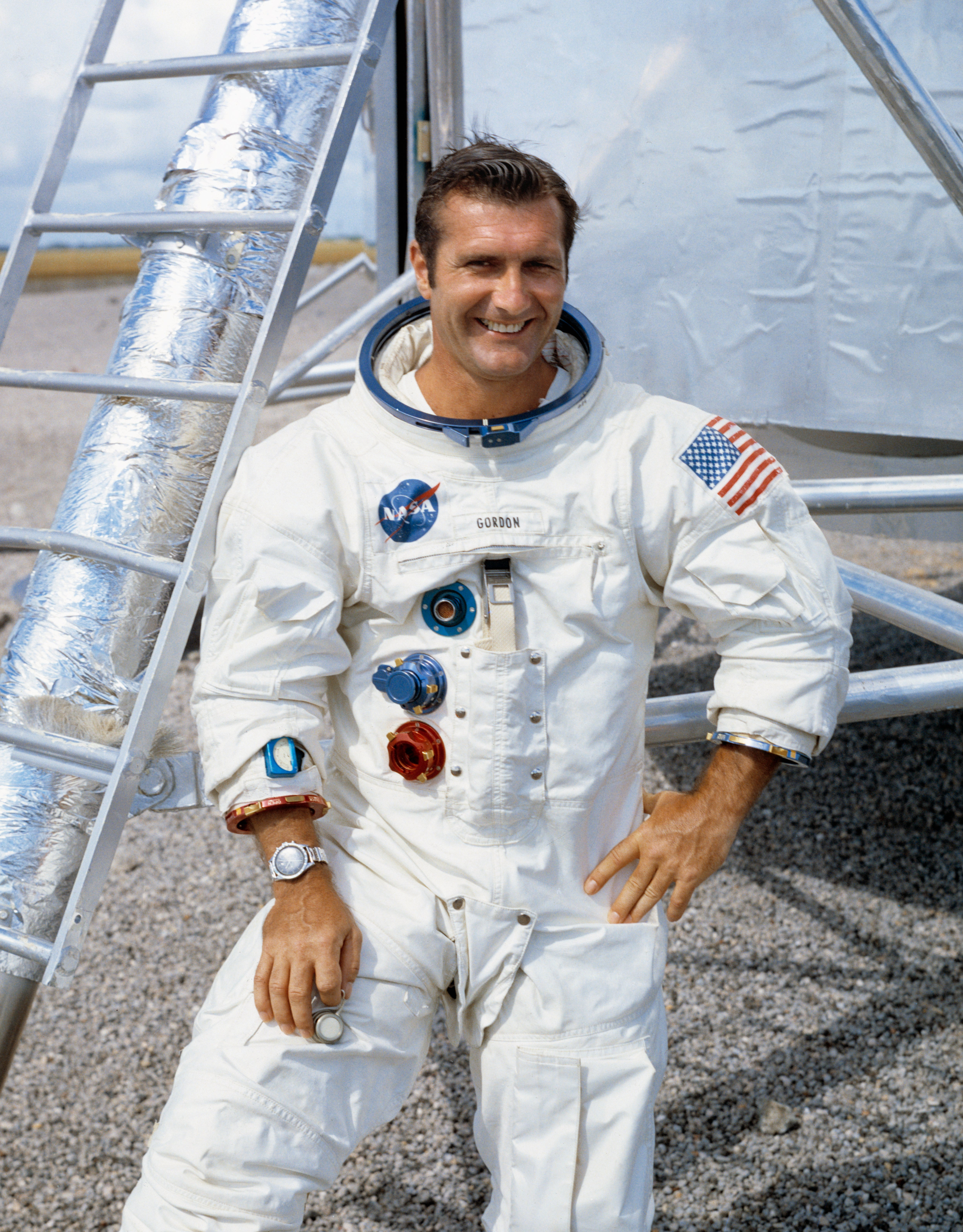
Gordon poses in his Apollo 12 space suit

Gordon was one of the third group of astronauts, named by NASA in October 1963, being the oldest astronaut in his selection. He had been a finalist for the second selection, in 1962.

==== Project Gemini ====
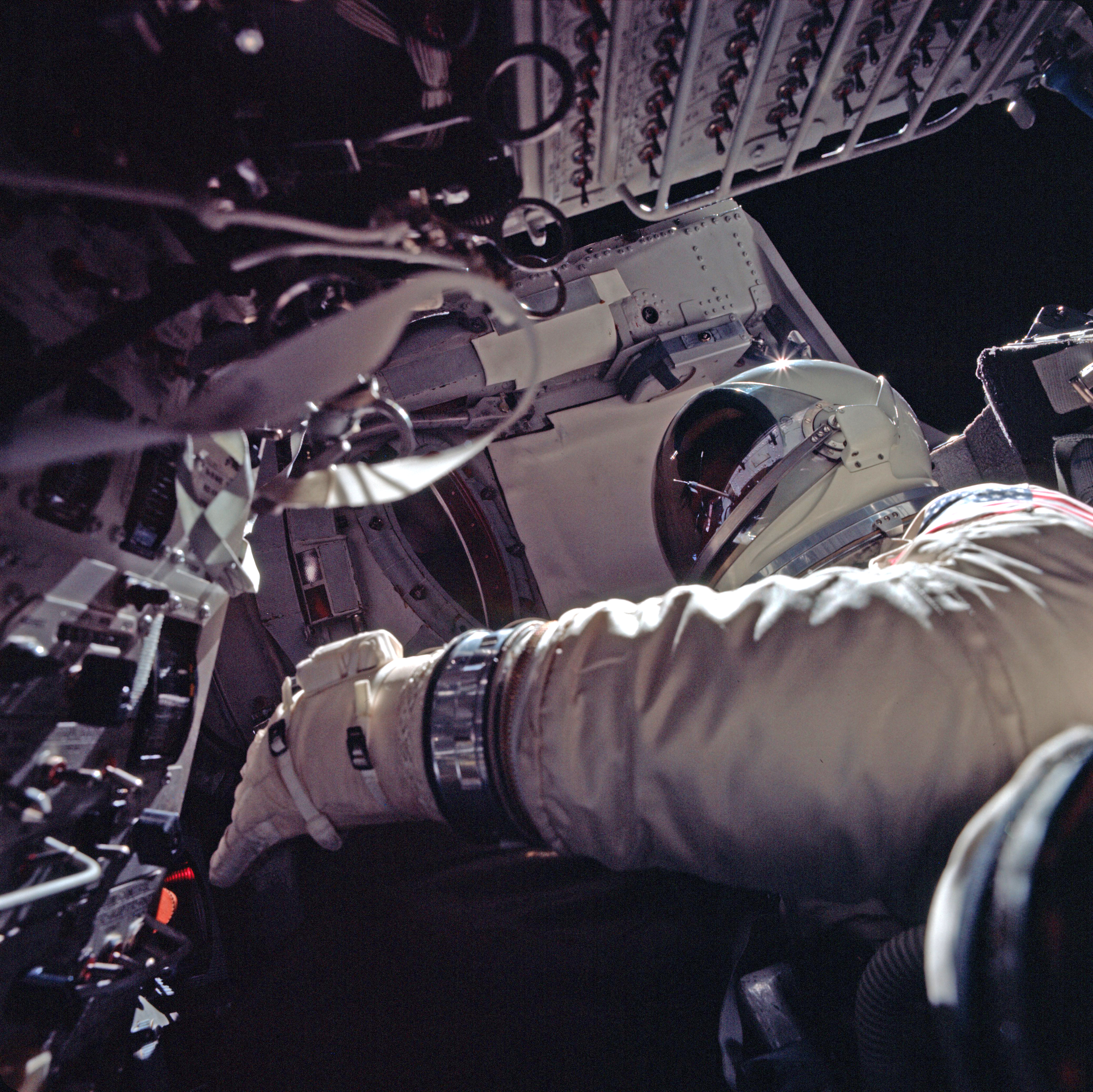
Gordon during his Gemini 11 flight

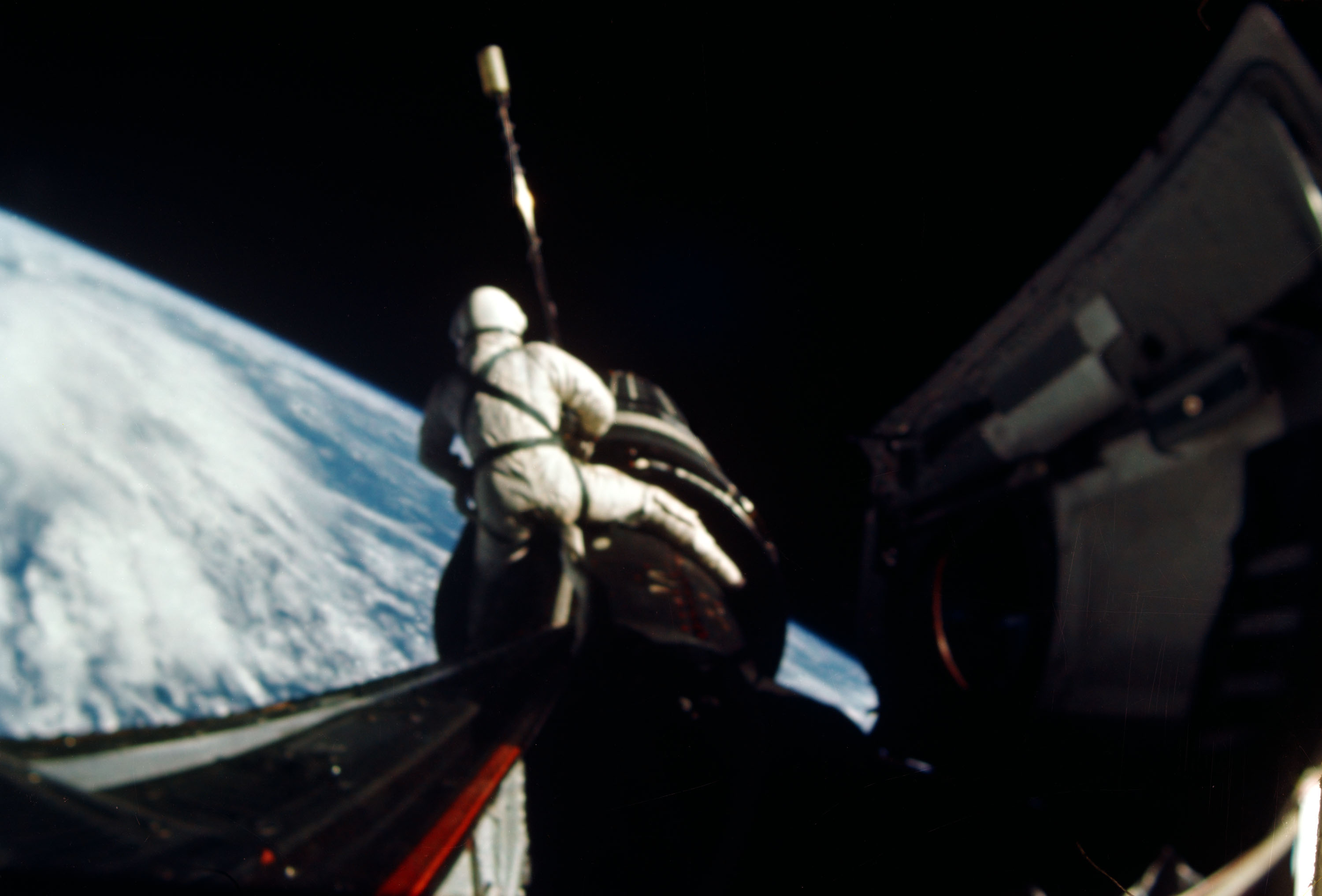
Gordon during his Gemini 11 EVA

Gordon served as backup pilot for the Gemini 8 flight. In September 1966, he made his first space flight, as pilot of Gemini 11, alongside Pete Conrad. At the time, the flight set an altitude record of 1,369 kilometres (851 miles). Gordon was already good friends with Conrad, who had once been his roommate on the aircraft carrier USS Ranger. On the flight, Gordon performed two spacewalks, which included attaching a tether to the Agena and retrieving a nuclear emulsion experiment package.

==== Apollo program ====
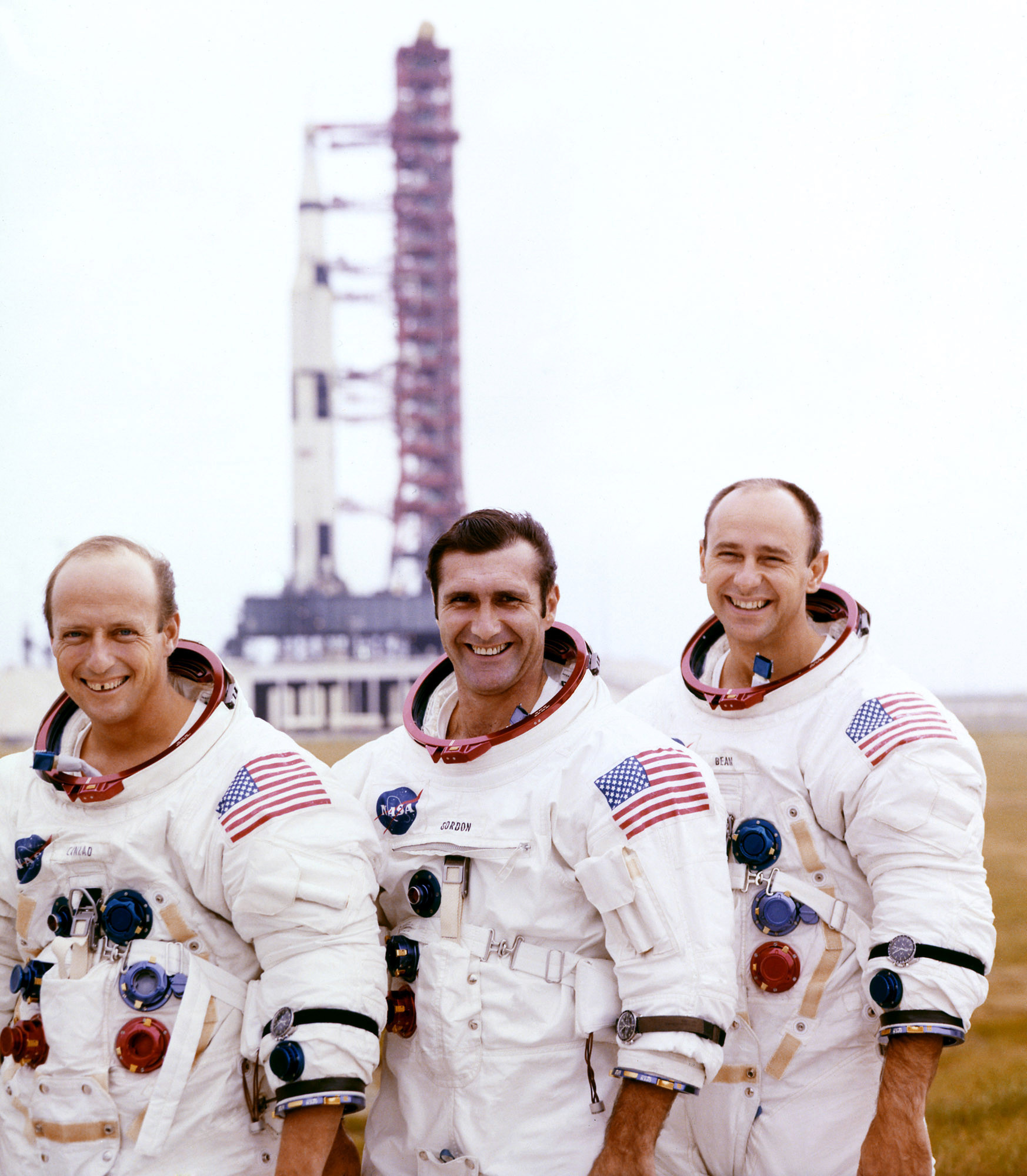
Pete Conrad, Dick Gordon, and Alan Bean pose with their Apollo 12 Saturn V Moon rocket in the background on the pad at Cape Canaveral on October 29, 1969.

Gordon was assigned as the backup command module pilot for Apollo 9. In November 1969, he flew as command module pilot of Apollo 12, the second crewed mission to land on the Moon. While his crewmates, Pete Conrad and Alan Bean, landed in the Ocean of Storms, Gordon remained in lunar orbit aboard the command module Yankee Clipper, photographing tentative landing sites for future missions.

After Apollo 12, Gordon served as the backup commander of Apollo 15. He was slated to walk on the Moon as commander of Apollo 18, but the mission was canceled because of budget cuts.

Gordon logged a total of 315 hours and 53 minutes in space, of which 2 hours and 41 minutes were spent in EVA.

==== Astronaut office ====
After his flights, Gordon worked in the astronaut office. He became the chief of advanced programs in 1971. Gordon worked on the design of the Space Shuttle.

He retired from NASA and the U.S. Navy in January 1972.

=== Post-NASA career ===
After leaving NASA, Gordon served as executive vice president of the New Orleans Saints Professional Football Club in the National Football League (1972–1976); was general manager of Energy Developers, Limited (EDL), a Texas partnership involved in a joint venture with Rocket Research Corporation for the development of a liquid chemical explosive for use in the oil and gas industry (1977); president of Resolution Engineering and Development Company (REDCO), which provided design and operational requirements for wild oil well control and fire fighting equipment on board large semisubmersible utility vessels (1978); following REDCO merger with Amarco Resources, Gordon assumed the additional duties of vice president of marketing, Westdale, an oil well servicing subsidiary of AMARCO operating in North Central Texas and Oklahoma, and also served as vice president for operations, Texas Division (1980); served as director, Scott Science and Technology, Inc., Los Angeles Division (1981–1983).

In March 1982 he became president of Astro Sciences Corporation. This company provides a range of services including engineering, project management, project field support teams, to software and hardware system design for control room applications. In the summer of 1984, Gordon was a technical advisor for and played the part of "Capcom" in the CBS miniseries Space by James A. Michener.

Gordon served as chairman and co-chairman of the Louisiana Heart Fund, chairman of the March of Dimes (Mother's March), honorary chairman for Muscular Dystrophy, and on the boards of directors for the Boy Scouts of America and Boys' Club of Greater New Orleans.

=== Personal life ===
From his marriage (which ended in divorce) to his first wife Barbara Field, who died in 2014, Gordon had six children. He died in San Marcos, California, on November 6, 2017, at the age of 88. His hobbies included water skiing and golf. He was buried at Arlington National Cemetery.

== Organizations ==
Gordon was a fellow of the American Astronautical Society, an associate fellow of Society of Experimental Test Pilots, a member of the Navy League, and a member of Phi Sigma Kappa.

== Awards and honors ==
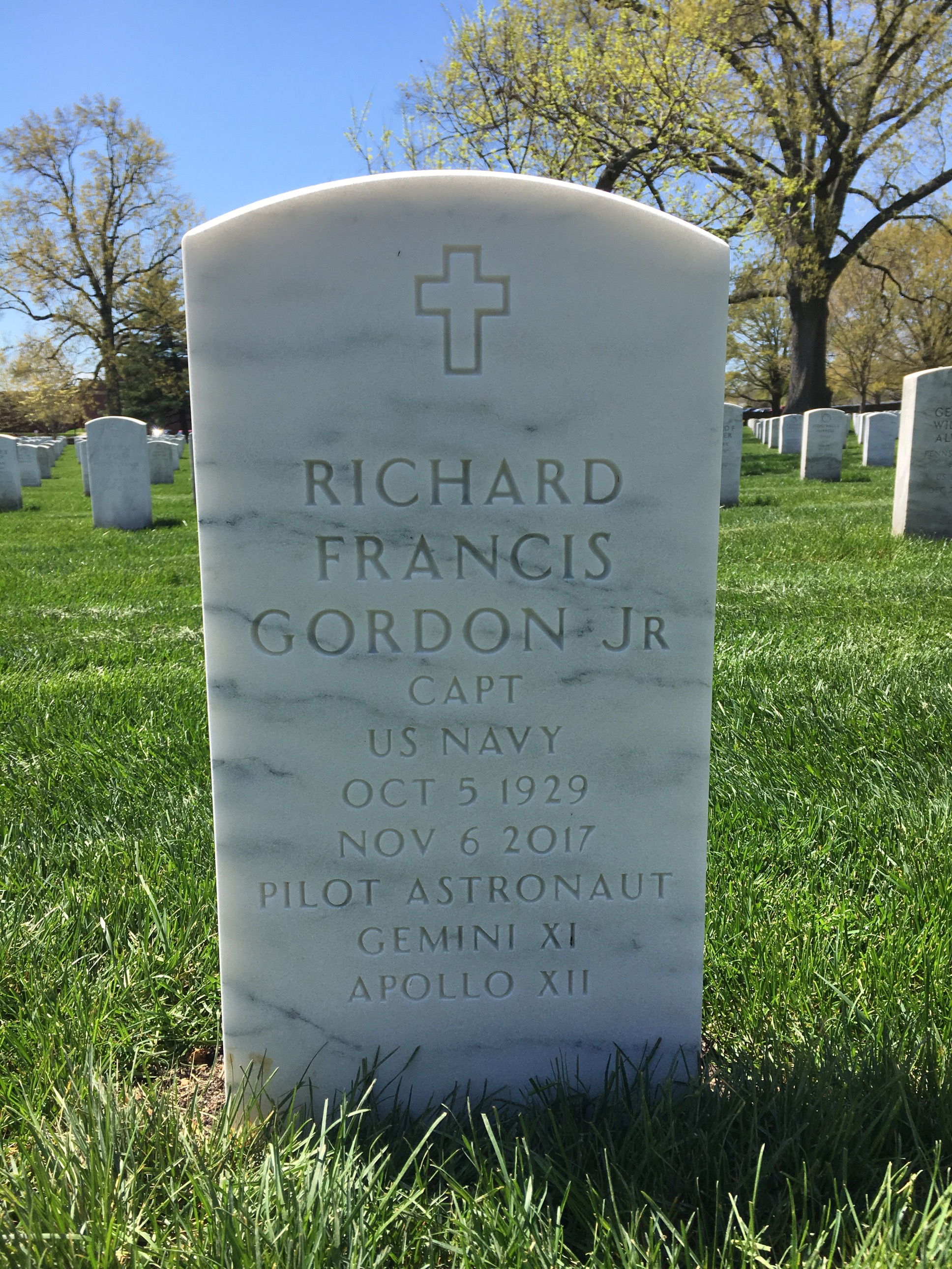
Grave of Capt. Richard Francis Gordon Jr. at Arlington National Cemetery

- Navy Astronaut Wings;
- NASA Distinguished Service Medal;
- NASA Exceptional Service Medal;
- Bendix Trophy in 1961;
- Two Navy Distinguished Flying Crosses;
- Navy Distinguished Service Medal;
- Phi Sigma Kappa Merit Award in 1966;
- Institute of Navigation Award for 1969;
- Godfrey L. Cabot Award in 1970;
- Rear Admiral William S. Parsons Award for Scientific and Technical Progress in 1970;
- Manned Spacecraft Center (MSC) Superior Achievement Award;
- NASA Group Achievement Award;
- Richard Gordon Elementary School in Kingston, Washington, was named after him.

Gordon was inducted into the International Space Hall of Fame with nine of his Gemini astronaut colleagues in 1982. He was inducted into the United States Astronaut Hall of Fame on March 19, 1993. In 2020, Gordon was inducted into the National Aviation Hall of Fame in Dayton, Ohio.

== In media ==
In the 1998 HBO miniseries From the Earth to the Moon Gordon was played by Tom Verica.

== Bibliography ==
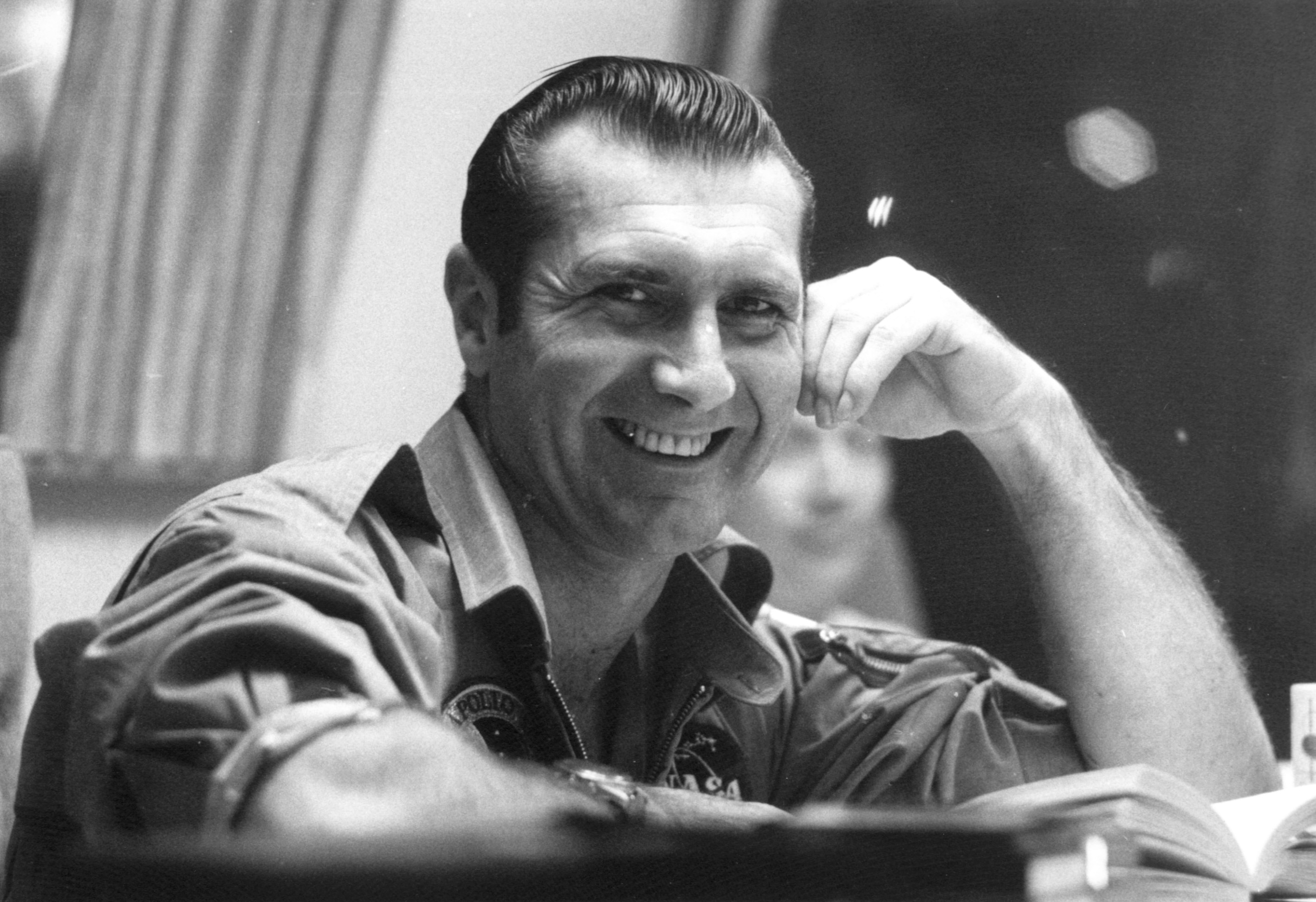
Gordon following his Apollo 12 flight

- Foreword for astronaut Al Worden's 2011 book, Falling to Earth: An Apollo 15 Astronaut's Journey to the Moon
- Foreword to the 2010 book Footprints in the Dust: The Epic Voyages of Apollo, 1969–1975, edited by Colin Burgess.
- Gordon, R. F., F4H-1 Navy Preliminary Evaluation, Phase I, NAS Patuxent River, Maryland, September 1958;
- Gordon, R. F., F4H-1 Navy Preliminary Evaluation, Phase I Supplement, October 1958;
- Gordon, R. F., FJ-4B Fuel Consumption and Performance Report, Flight Test, NAS Patuxent River, Maryland, 1958;
- Gordon, R. F., F11F Fuel Consumption and Performance Report, Flight Test, NAS Patuxent River, Maryland, 1958;
- Gordon, R. F., Revised Roll Performance Requirements for MIL-SPEC-F-8785. All Aircraft in Configuration PA, Flight Test, NAS Patuxent River, Maryland, 1958;
- Gordon, R. F., F8U Spin Evaluation Report, Flight Test, NAS Patuxent River, Maryland, 1959;
- Gordon, R. F., Gemini XI, Gemini Program Mission Report, NASA Manned Spacecraft Center Report, October 1966;
- Gordon, R. F., Apollo XII Mission Report, NASA Manned Spacecraft Center Report, December 1969.
