= Dixie Square Mall =

Defunct mall in Harvey, Illinois, U.S.

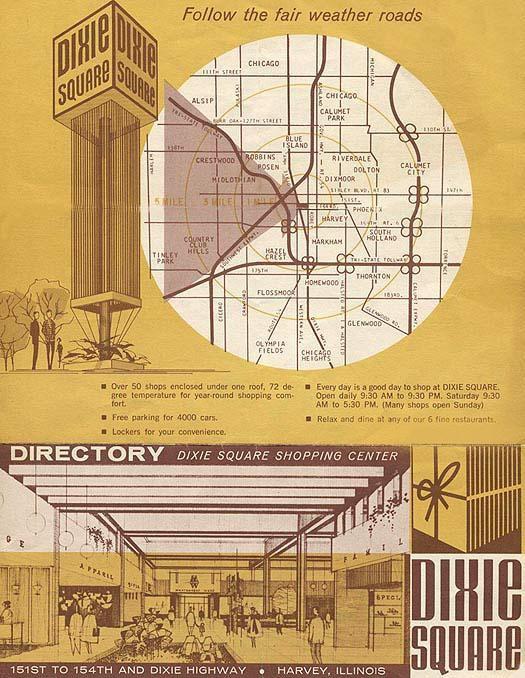
- Front cover of mall directory, c. 1966
- Location: Harvey, Illinois, U.S.
- Coordinates: 41°36′48″N 87°40′07″W
- Address: 15151 Dixie Highway
- Opened: August 31, 1966; 60 years ago
- Closed: November 1978; 48 years ago
- Developer: Robert Meyer Corporation
- Num. of stores: 64
- Num. of anchor tenants: 6
- Floor area: 600,000 sq ft (56,000 m^{2})
- Floors: 1 (2 in JCPenney)

Dixie Mall, originally known as Dixie Square Shopping Center and better known as Dixie Square Mall, was an enclosed shopping mall at the junction of 151st Street and Dixie Highway in the Chicago suburb of Harvey, Illinois, United States. Opened in 1966, the mall featured Montgomery Ward, JCPenney, Woolworth, Walgreens, and Jewel as its anchor stores, with discount store Turn Style joining in 1970. The mall was in operation for twelve years, closing permanently in 1978. It is thus considered an early example of a dead mall; it was characterized by high vacancy rates and low patronage, which led to its closure. While many other dead malls were redeveloped or demolished, Dixie Square became notable for its extensive neglect, vandalism damage, and history. After closure, the mall was used for a scene in the film The Blues Brothers and then left abandoned. It achieved notoriety because of a growing Internet cult-following of urban exploration groups dedicated to covering the mall's deteriorating condition.

In the decades after the mall closed, numerous proposals to redevelop the property were announced, though none came to fruition. Over the 30-plus years during which these proposals and others were presented and failed, Dixie Square Mall fell into disrepair and decay due to natural elements, vandalism, arson, and a lack of maintenance funds. Another proposal of redevelopment in 2005 resulted in halted partial demolition. Demolition funds were granted in September 2010, due to start in November, but delayed till February 2012 and final demolition was completed in May of that year.

== History ==
=== Overview ===
Dixie Square was built on Dixie Highway in the city of Harvey, Illinois, a southern suburb of Chicago. The property was developed by Robert Meyer Corporation, Meyer C. Weiner, Robert E. Fryling, and T. C. MacDonald, with the firm of Hornbach, Steenwyk, and Thrall serving as architects. It opened in 1966 on the site of the former Dixie Hi 9-hole golf course. Construction began in late 1964, and Montgomery Ward was the first of the mall's stores to open, on October 21, 1965. A soft opening took place August 31, 1966, with 36 stores, during which a time capsule was sealed and placed on the property by Mel Tormé and Carmelita Pope. Final construction was completed nearly three months later, and the mall was dedicated on November 9, 1966, with grand opening celebrations from November 10–12, and 50 stores open. Grand opening celebrations featured Homer and Jethro, Art Hodes and Sid Sakowicz, the Art Van Damme Quintet, and Ned Locke of the Bozo's Circus TV show. The mall had 64 shops by 1968, including Montgomery Ward, JCPenney, Woolworth, Walgreens, and a Jewel supermarket. In 1970, Turn Style was added as another anchor.

=== Decline, rebranding, and closure ===
Logo from the mall’s tenure as Dixie Mall, 1975–1978

By the early 1970s, crime was increasing in Harvey, a poverty-stricken and blighted suburb 20 miles (32 km) south of Chicago, and several significant criminal incidents occurred at or near the mall, including three murders in one year alone. In November 1972, a young woman was fatally shot near the mall in a botched robbery attempt. On April 20, 1973, another person was shot and killed in a robbery on the mall property itself. On July 17, 1973, a teenage girl was lured away from the mall by three other teenage girls, and strangled to death.

Publicity surrounding the murders and local crime rates contributed to the decline in business at Dixie Square from 1973. Another factor was the August 1973 opening of the larger and better-publicized Lincoln Mall in Matteson, only a few miles from Dixie Square. From 1973 to 1978, Dixie lost many stores, including Turn Style, which left in December 1973, and the Montgomery Ward anchor, which closed on October 4, 1976. In a last-ditch effort to bring back shoppers and tenants, the mall rebranded as simply "Dixie Mall" in late July 1975, and soon after underwent a $500,000 renovation, reopening on October 9 of that same year. These efforts failed, as growing poverty in the Harvey area resulted in fewer local residents being able to patronize the mall.

By early 1977, Dixie Mall had become a community retail center instead of a regional retail hub, and was characterized as a "ghost town" and "total loss". The mall was down to its final twenty stores by the following year, and officially closed its doors in November 1978, with JCPenney closing in January 1979. A 1978 article in the Chicago Tribune indicated that two major factors in the mall's closure were shoplifting and theft of merchandise by employees. The last major retailer, the Jewel Food store, closed in July 1979.

=== Post-closure ===
==== Temporary school and movie set ====
The mall chase scene from The Blues Brothers. Pictured on the left is the former Walgreens storefront, dressed as a Toys "R" Us for the movie.

In January 1979, the City of Harvey allowed the Harvey-Dixmoor School District to use mall space as a temporary school location while a new school building was constructed. This use, which lasted for two years, also included conversion of the former Turn Style into a gymnasium.

In mid-1979, director John Landis rented the vacant mall for eight weeks to film a scene in the movie The Blues Brothers. In this scene, main characters Elwood and Jake Blues drive through storefronts, display cases, and walls and destroy much of the mall while being chased by Illinois State Police troopers. The mall interior was left damaged after filming wrapped. A wall that film crews constructed, which cars crashed through at the beginning of the scene, was recognizable inside the building until the mid 1980s.

The Harvey-Dixmoor School District attempted to sue the film's distributor Universal Pictures in December 1981 for $87,000, citing their failure to repair damage to mall property created during the movie shoot. The district soon vacated the property, and the mall was completely shuttered.

==== Abandonment ====
Following the movie shoot and the departure of the school district, the mall sat completely empty while new uses for the property were sought. During this period, some area residents used the mall and its parking lots as a dumping site. Also around this time, the large triangular "Dixie" sign, added in the 1975 renovation and seen in the Blues Brothers film, was removed. The canvas covering the JCPenney court area was removed as well, allowing rain and snow to enter the building. Over time, this, coupled with lack of maintenance, took its toll on the building. In 1984, vandals broke in for the first time, damaging and looting the mall. Leaving a number of entrances open in the process, the thieves stole any metal fixtures and fittings worth salvaging, along with virtually all of the original store signs. In 1985, soon after a full-time caretaker and grounds crew were hired to maintain and clean up the site in preparation for redevelopment, vandals smashed every accessible pane of glass in the former mall.

The city of Harvey took over the mall property from the Harvey-Dixmoor school district on August 27, 1985. Also that year, the Wards Auto Service garage in the southwest corner of the mall property was razed, in preparation for construction of a new police station for Harvey. Work was temporarily halted on July 9, 1987 (at about 35% completion) while concerns about the building's foundation were addressed; work on the police station resumed a week later. After the mall's abandonment, it experienced extensive neglect and damage from vandalism; the full-time caretaker hired to maintain the property was unable to effect more than cosmetic repairs, nor was the city able to fund continued maintenance.

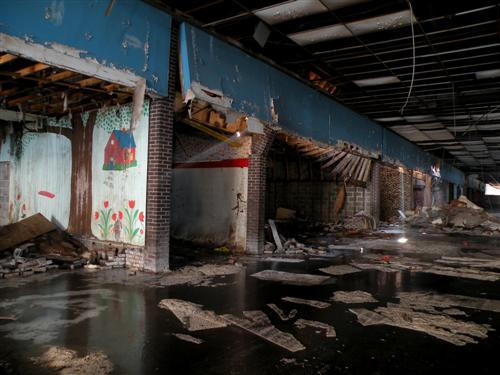
"Block B" storefronts inside Dixie Square as they appeared in 2009, showing a severe state of decay

Despite the new Harvey Police station occupying land immediately adjacent, the shuttered mall gained a reputation as a notorious crime magnet during the early 1990s. Gang and drug activities frequently took place inside the building. In the early 1990s, a juvenile court was constructed on the far west end of the parking lot. Despite numerous attempts to board up and secure the mall, it was forced open repeatedly. Vandalism and theft were the primary causes, but many homeless people also turned the former mall site into makeshift living quarters. In 1993, a woman was raped and fatally strangled inside the former JCPenney store. By the end of the 1990s, trees had grown throughout the former parking lot. In the mid 2000s, a massive fire broke out inside the former Woolworth store and nearly destroyed the building. The fire caused the roof to cave in, and due to that and other structural collapses, saplings started growing inside the former mall. Another fire broke out in the former City Life lounge, causing minor damage to the abandoned bar.

=== Demolition and redevelopment plans ===
Various redevelopment plans for the property were announced in 1985, 1989, and 1997, but never happened.

In January 2005, an agreement was made with American Kitchen Delights to turn the former Montgomery Ward building into a showroom for American Kitchen's products, and with the YMCA to use another portion of the property to build senior citizen housing. Just days after the agreement was made, work on the Montgomery Ward store began during which the former store was gutted. On April 14, 2005, a further plan was set in motion to demolish the remnants of Dixie Square (except for the Montgomery Ward building which was ostensibly being renovated for American Kitchen Delights) and bring top "big-box" retailers to the former mall site, including Costco, Kohl's, and Old Navy. This plan forecast bringing more than 1,000 jobs to Harvey, which has one of the highest unemployment rates in Cook County.

==== Complications ====
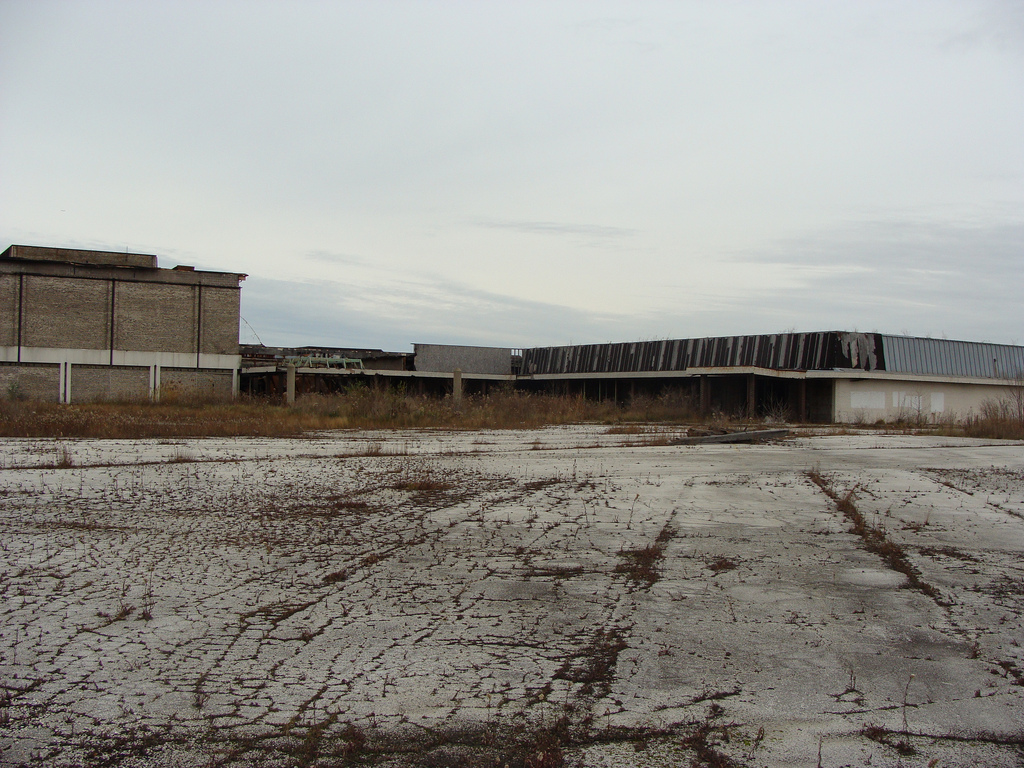
Former JCPenney and Jewel buildings in November 2009

In late June 2005, inspectors discovered the mall contained asbestos and ordered removed debris to be covered in plastic. They also discovered that the demolition company had been working without a permit. On July 3, 2005, the site renovation/demolition project was ordered halted until the asbestos issue could be properly resolved. Late on Christmas Eve 2005, the Mayor of Harvey happened to drive past the site and discovered work crews, without having resolved the asbestos problem, were illegally demolishing the central energy plant and had also torn down a large portion of the Montgomery Ward building accidentally (ending any chance of its renovation).

On February 16, 2006, the entire mall property was sold to developer John Deneen of the Emerald Property Group. The remainder of the Montgomery Ward building was torn down March 1 in a widely publicized PR campaign, but no progress was made to demolish the rest of the mall afterwards. After the news crews left, so did the demolition companies. Within several months of the Montgomery Ward demolition, liens were placed against the mall by several invested companies. Deneen threatened the owner of one of these companies with brass knuckles and a firearm (as a result, he pleaded guilty in 2008 to aggravated unlawful use of a weapon). Illinois Attorney General Lisa Madigan also filed lawsuits against Deneen and several prior developers for failing to remove the asbestos in accordance with state law.

On July 20, 2009, a fire of unknown origin broke out in the entrance to Block C during the late afternoon. The fire damaged the Block C entrance to the point where its roof collapsed within a month, and left scorch marks on the exterior of the former JCPenney building.

==== Demolition plans resume ====
In February 2010, it was reported that Chicago-based developer MG Development South LLC was planning to demolish the remains of the mall and replace it with a mixture of big-box stores and other retail on the site.

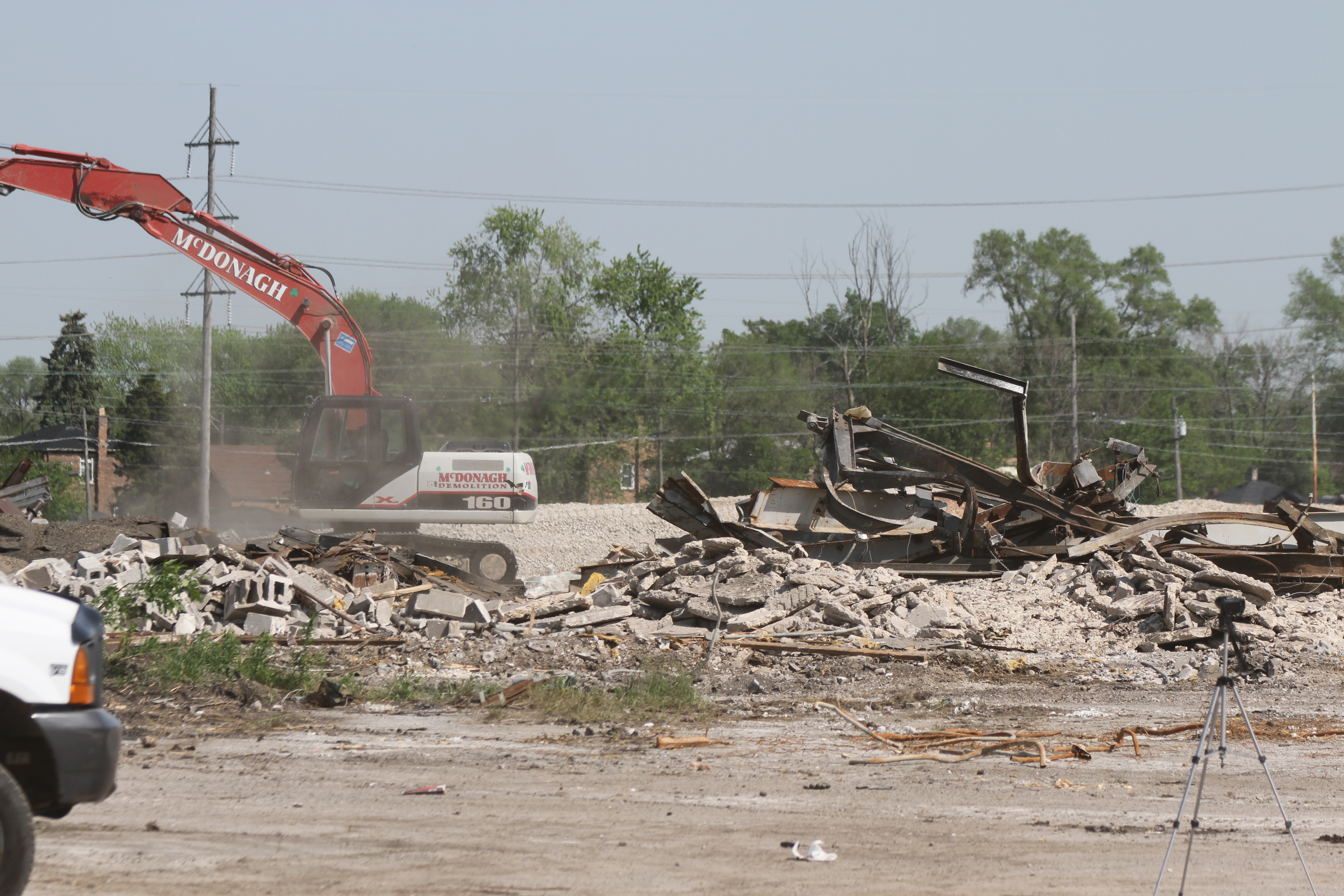
The last remains of Dixie Square as seen on May 17, 2012

Governor Pat Quinn announced on September 23, 2010, that a $4 million federal grant would be used to demolish the mall. Quinn also stated that the total cost would be around $5 million, with the remainder of the money coming from federal disaster recovery funds given to the state due to flooding in 2008. According to officials, demolition was to start in November of that year and take four to six months. In June 2011, the building structure remained intact with demolition funding still available, but with the demolition project itself mired in government regulatory hurdles.

==== Final demolition ====
In January 2012, contractors were finally issued the necessary permits to begin demolition. After several weeks of asbestos abatement, which was completed by early February, crews began to demolish the mall on Wednesday, February 15. Demolition was completed May 17, 2012, after which the site was cleaned up and leveled in preparation for future development.

The vast majority of the former site is now brownfield land. A November 2015 article suggested that the land be developed as an intermodal freight site.

The city of Harvey obtained possession of the former mall site in 2016. As of 2020, Harvey was preparing the site to offer to developers, and officials were putting the site forward as a good location for a cold storage warehouse.
