= Spectrum Community School =

High school in Washington, United States

Location
- 25800 Siyaya Avenue NE; Kingston, Washington; United States; 47°47′53″N 122°31′01″W

Information
- Type: Public alternative high school
- Established: 1984; 42 years ago
- Founder: Chris Wendelyn
- Closed: 2010
- School district: North Kitsap School District
- Grades: 9–12
- Enrollment: 135
- Mascot: Raven
- Website: Spectrum Community School

Spectrum Community School was an alternative high school in Kingston, Washington, United States. It was a part of the North Kitsap School District. The school had been running for over 20 years, and earned two awards of Special Merit from the Grammy Foundation in Los Angeles.

The school was designed for students searching for a nontraditional learning environment that embraced diversity, inclusion, different learning styles and preferences, tools, and a student empowered curriculum. The school sponsored exchange programs with Russia and Mexico. The school promoted social responsibility, respect for cultural diversity and appreciation for lifelong learning, and was founded with the support of North Kitsap School District and Chris Wendelyn in 1986.

Courses met all requirements for a formal STEM education and graduation with a high school diploma. Course design enabled students to integrate areas of interest to strengthen engagement and learning in critical areas of study. School leadership and faculty engaged local communities, traditions, and partnerships to strengthen student inclusion, engagement, and respect. Courses also supported onsite and distance learning objectives. Spectrum Community School was located on the same campus as the future Kingston High School.
