= Appletree Cove =

- Apple Tree Cove
- Location: Kitsap County, Washington
- Coordinates: 47°47′27″N 122°29′54.7″W
- Type: Bay
- Part of: Puget Sound
- Primary inflows: Carpenter Creek

Appletree Cove is a bay and estuary of Puget Sound on the Kitsap Peninsula in the U.S. state of Washington. The cove is fed by Carpenter Creek; its estuary is a tidal flood zone that fills and empties at high and low tides.

Appletree Cove was named "from the numbers of that tree which were in blossom around its shores" by Charles Wilkes who surveyed the area on April 9, 1841, on the Wilkes expedition. Reportedly these Pacific crabapple trees were cleared by Benjamin Bannister after settling at the bay in 1874. Another source says Wilkes mistook flowering dogwoods for apple trees.

Appletree Cove is the site of the Kingston ferry terminal for the Washington State Ferries.

Appletree Cove is also the former name of the town of Kingston, Washington which is to the north and west of the cove. To the south is an area known by the locals as "Jefferson Beach".
