= Harvey School District 152 =

School district in Illinois, United States

Address
- 16001 Lincoln Avenue Harvey, Illinois, 60426; United States

District information
- Type: Public
- Grades: PreK–8
- NCES District ID: 1718450

Students and staff
- Students: 1,687

Other information
- Website: www.harvey152.org

Harvey School District 152 is a school district headquartered in Harvey, Illinois near Chicago.

== Schools ==
Secondary schools

- Brooks Middle School

Elementary schools

- Maya Angelou Elementary School
- Bryant Elementary School
- Holmes Elementary School
- Lowell-Longfellow Elementary School (closed 2017)
- Carl Sandburg Elementary School
- Whittier Elementary School

Pre-K

- Riley Early Childhood Center
