= Harvey, Illinois =

- City
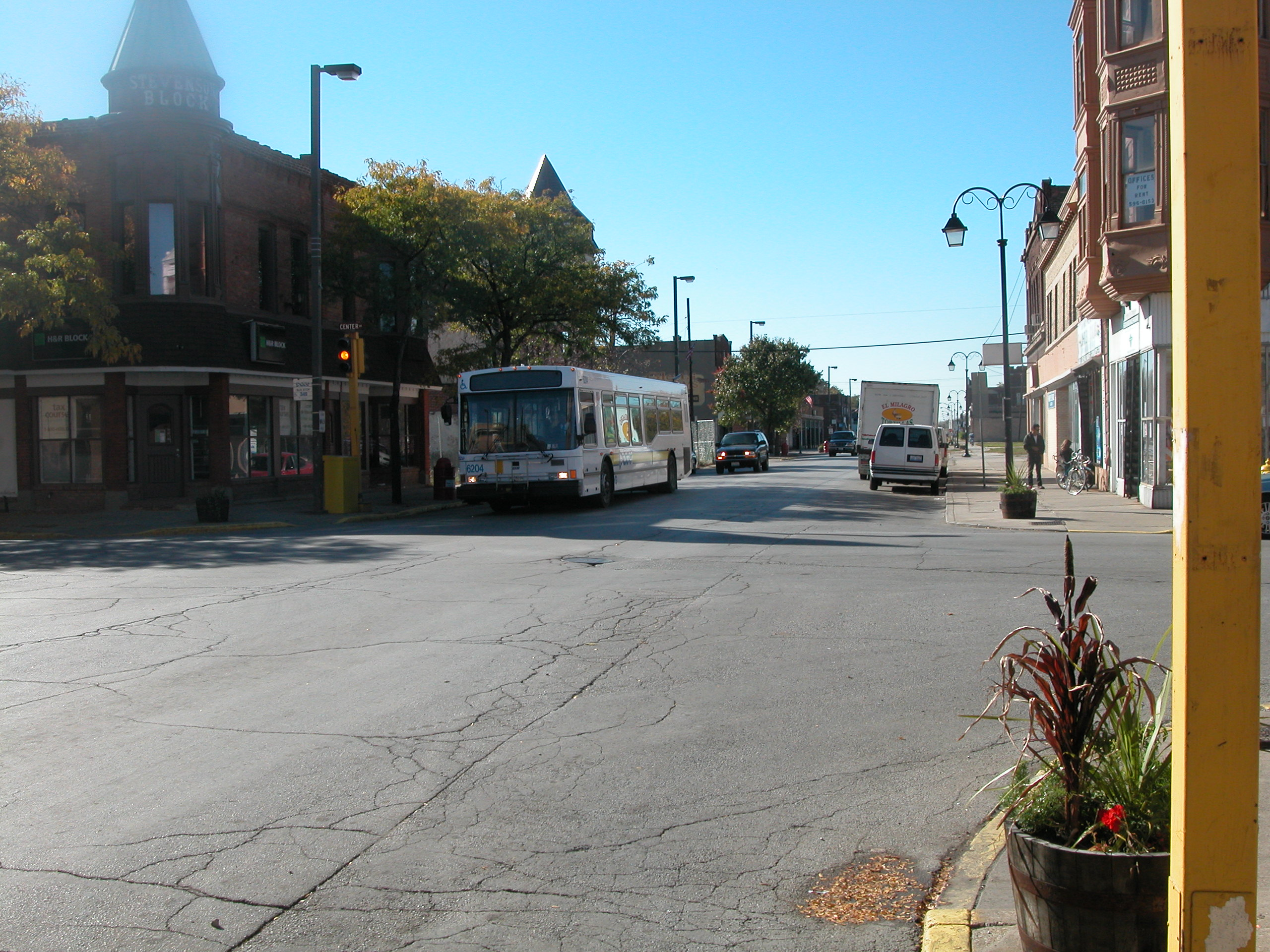
- Central Business District

- Flag Seal
- Nickname: "Gateway to the South Suburbs"
- Motto(s): Integrity, Unity, Pride
- Location of Harvey in Cook County, Illinois.

- Location within Greater Chicago Location within Illinois Location within the United States
- Coordinates: 41°36′36″N 87°38′48″W
- Country: United States
- State: Illinois
- County: Cook
- Township: Thornton, Bremen
- Founded: May 1891
- Village: May 1891
- City Charter: May 15, 1895

Government
  - Mayor: Shirley Drewenski (acting)

Area
  - Total: 6.20 sq mi (16.07 km^{2})
  - Land: 6.20 sq mi (16.07 km^{2})
  - Water: 0 sq mi (0.00 km^{2})
- Elevation: 604 ft (184 m)

Population (2020)
  - Total: 20,324
  - Density: 3,274.8/sq mi (1,264.41/km^{2})
- Time zone: UTC-6 (CST)
  - Summer (DST): UTC-5 (CDT)
- ZIP Code(s): 60426–60428
- Area code: 708
- FIPS code: 17-33383
- Wikimedia Commons: Harvey, Illinois
- Website: www.cityofharveyil.gov

Harvey is a city and south suburb of Chicago in Cook County, Illinois, United States. The population was 20,324 at the 2020 census.

Harvey is bordered by the villages of Dixmoor and Riverdale to the north; Dolton, Phoenix, and South Holland to the east; East Hazel Crest to the south; and Hazel Crest, Markham and Posen to the west.

== History ==
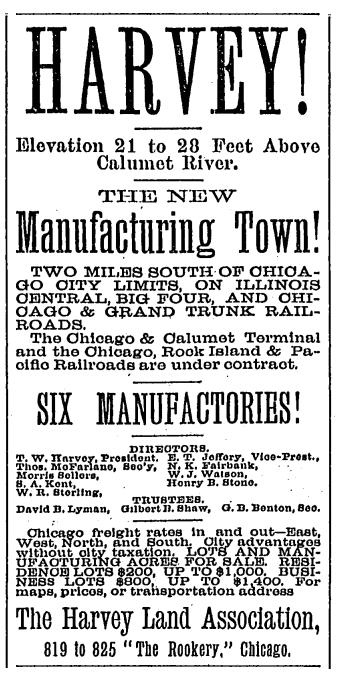
Advertisement by The Harvey Land Association that appeared on November 8, 1890, in the Chicago Daily Tribune

=== Beginnings ===
In 1871–72, a syndicate of six area businessmen purchased 1,700 acres of land and divided it into lots, establishing the "South Lawn" community. On October 1, 1874, contractor John Gay purchased two lots and began grading streets. He also graded a railway line for the Grand Trunk Western Railroad from Thornton through South Lawn, which was instrumental in generating industrial development. In 1880, Harvey L. Hopkins established the first significant local industry, a mower factory. In 1889, Turlington W. Harvey made large land purchases, which he transferred to the Harvey Land Association. Harvey was a close associate of Dwight Moody, the founder of the Moody Bible Institute in Chicago.

On April 12, 1890, local voters incorporated the new town as one of the Temperance Towns, to be a model town for Christian values. It was closely modeled after the company town of Pullman, which eventually was annexed into the city of Chicago. Turlington Harvey preferred the town be named "Turlington," but postmaster William H. Pease suggested "Harvey" to recognize both Turlington Harvey and Harvey Hopkins, the first local industrialist. On June 11, 1891, Peter B. Lamb was elected the first village president. A public school district was established in April 1892. On April 15, 1895, a local referendum elevated the village to city status, and Jonathan W. Matthews was elected Harvey's first mayor on May 25. In February 1903, the city established a public library.

=== Growth and decline ===
Driven by flourishing local industries, Harvey experienced its greatest growth in the prosperous post-WWII years. In June 1964, the city announced the forthcoming construction of the Dixie Square Mall, named after the former Dixie-Hi Golf Course which it would replace. Harvey celebrated its 75th anniversary in 1966, highlighted by the grand opening of Dixie Square on November 10, along with the opening of a new city hall and municipal building three days later. Despite the initial popularity of Dixie Square, the mall's opening had a negative impact, as small businesses in downtown Harvey declined and eventually closed; the downtown shopping district failed to recover. Responding to the civil rights movement, the city council enacted a fair housing ordinance on May 27, 1968.

As with other Rust Belt industrial communities, Harvey was severely affected by deindustrialization and rising crime rates from the 1960s, resulting in white flight. By 1966, reports of robberies, auto thefts, and instances of resisting arrest had increased by over 50 percent from 1964. Local employment peaked in 1974 and subsequently declined rapidly. The Dixie Square Mall closed in November 1978. The city reached its peak population in 1980. By then, it was experiencing job and population losses through the restructuring of area industries. Major blows came in 1985, when Allis-Chalmers decided to close its Harvey engine plant in mid-1986; effective from August 1, 1985, ARCO also closed its Harvey laboratories, which it had taken over from Sinclair Oil. In 1986, Wyman-Gordon closed its crankshaft factory; in total, approximately 1,200 jobs were lost with the closings.

=== Recent history ===
Since the 1980s, crime, poverty, and urban decay have plagued Harvey, along with high property tax rates due to the disappearance of an industrial tax base. In the 2000s and 2010s, Mayor Eric Kellogg attempted to boost Harvey's economy, with little success. Kellogg offered developers millions of dollars in incentives to revive the long-vacant Dixie Square Mall, but trends in retail adversely affected malls around the country. The city granted a developer $10 million in incentives to redevelop the Chicago Park Hotel, but he abandoned the project before completion, leaving the building gutted.

In February 2018, Harvey became the first city in Illinois to have its revenue garnished by the State in order to fund the city's pension liabilities. The city laid off employees in order to deal with the changes.

Most recent Harvey mayor Christopher J. Clark, who had served as the city's mayor since 2019, died on January 30, 2026.

== Geography ==
Harvey has a total area of 6.21 square miles (16.08 km^{2}), all land.

=== Surrounding areas ===
Dixmoor / Riverdale
Posen Riverdale / Dolton
Markham Dolton / Phoenix / South Holland
Markham South Holland
Markham / East Hazelcrest

== Demographics ==
Historical population
Census	Pop.	Note	%±
1900	5,395		—
1910	7,227		34.0%
1920	9,216		27.5%
1930	16,374		77.7%
1940	17,878		9.2%
1950	20,683		15.7%
1960	29,071		40.6%
1970	34,636		19.1%
1980	35,810		3.4%
1990	29,767		−16.9%
2000	30,000		0.8%
2010	25,282		−15.7%
2020	20,324		−19.6%
U.S. Decennial Census; 2010 2020

=== Racial and ethnic composition ===
Harvey city, Illinois – Racial and ethnic composition Note: the US Census treats Hispanic/Latino as an ethnic category. This table excludes Latinos from the racial categories and assigns them to a separate category. Hispanics/Latinos may be of any race.
Race / Ethnicity (NH = Non-Hispanic)	Pop 1970	Pop 1980	Pop 1990	Pop 2000	Pop 2010	Pop 2020	% 1970	% 1980	% 1990	% 2000	% 2010	% 2020
White alone (NH)	23,741	10,602	4,104	1,903	913	591	68.54%	29.61%	13.79%	6.34%	3.61%	2.91%
Black or African American alone (NH)	10,711	23,347	23,827	23,732	19,046	12,729	30.92%	65.20%	80.05%	79.11%	75.33%	62.63%
Native American or Alaska Native alone (NH)	27	52	39	37	33	25	0.08%	0.15%	0.13%	0.12%	0.13%	0.12%
Asian alone (NH)	37	63	12	103	199	490	0.11%	0.18%	0.04%	0.34%	0.79%	2.41%
Native Hawaiian or Pacific Islander alone (NH)	x	2	0	5	10	8	x	0.01%	0.00%	0.02%	0.04%	0.04%
Other race alone (NH)	120	101	23	33	15	91	0.35%	0.28%	0.08%	0.11%	0.06%	0.45%
Mixed race or Multiracial (NH)	x	x	x	353	267	350	x	x	x	1.18%	1.06%	1.72%
Hispanic or Latino (any race)	x	1,643	1,762	3,834	4,799	6,040	x	4.59%	5.92%	12.78%	18.98%	29.72%
Total	34,636	35,810	29,767	30,000	25,282	20,324	100.00%	100.00%	100.00%	100.00%	100.00%	100.00%

=== 2020 census ===
As of the 2020 census, Harvey had a population of 20,324. The median age was 36.4 years. 25.3% of residents were under the age of 18 and 14.8% of residents were 65 years of age or older. For every 100 females there were 98.8 males, and for every 100 females age 18 and over there were 96.0 males age 18 and over.

100.0% of residents lived in urban areas, while 0.0% lived in rural areas.

There were 7,100 households in Harvey, of which 34.4% had children under the age of 18 living in them. Of all households, 27.0% were married-couple households, 26.2% were households with a male householder and no spouse or partner present, and 40.1% were households with a female householder and no spouse or partner present. About 30.3% of all households were made up of individuals and 11.9% had someone living alone who was 65 years of age or older.

There were 8,531 housing units, of which 16.8% were vacant. The homeowner vacancy rate was 3.5% and the rental vacancy rate was 9.6%.

Racial composition as of the 2020 census
Race	Number	Percent
White	1,194	5.9%
Black or African American	12,871	63.3%
American Indian and Alaska Native	166	0.8%
Asian	508	2.5%
Native Hawaiian and Other Pacific Islander	8	0.0%
Some other race	4,176	20.5%
Two or more races	1,401	6.9%
Hispanic or Latino (of any race)	6,040	29.7%

=== 2000 census ===
There were 8,657 households, out of which 34.1% had children under the age of 18 living with them, 27.90% were married couples living together, 31.00% had a female householder with no husband present, and 36.56% were non-families. 33.67% of all households were made up of individuals, and 13.49% had someone living alone who was 65 years of age or older. The average household size was 3.62 and the average family size was 2.77.

The city's age distribution consisted of 25.8% under the age of 18, 11.9% from 18 to 24, 24.2% from 25 to 44, 24.7% from 45 to 64, and 13.5% who were 65 years of age or older. The median age was 34.5 years. For every 100 females, there were 91.0 males. For every 100 females age 18 and over, there were 89.2 males.

The median income for a household in the city was $32,635, and the median income for a family was $45,729. Males had a median income of $28,204 versus $24,671 for females. The per capita income for the city was $18,919. About 25.3% of families and 31.1% of the population were below the poverty line, including 47.6% of those under age 18 and 17.6% of those age 65 or over.

== Government ==
Harvey is in Illinois's 2nd congressional district.

The city faces severe financial problems. From 2010 to 2013, it failed to fund its police and fire pensions, paying just $140 of $10.1 million required contributions. This problem has been reported in other Chicago suburbs with economic problems. Since 2007, Harvey has refused to audit its municipal finances as required by the state. The Securities and Exchange Commission alleges that during this time, there was "a scheme to divert bond proceeds for improper purposes."

As of September 2014, some aldermen were concerned the city could soon be unable to make payroll. In 2017, the city was forced to pay almost $11 million in unpaid and underpaid pension fund contributions for the city's firefighters. A panel of judges on the Illinois First District Appellate Court in Chicago determined that Harvey's mayor and city Council had improperly abused their discretionary powers for years. According to the Cook County Record, "The case had landed in Cook County court in 2010, when the Board of Trustees of the City of Harvey Firefighters’ Pension Fund first filed suit against the city of Harvey, alleging chronic underfunding of the pension fund, which managed pension money for 67 retired firefighters, had left the fund teetering on the verge of insolvency."

=== Mayors of Harvey ===
Mayors of Harvey, Illinois

Image	Mayor	Years	Tenure	Notes	Refs
	Peter B. Lamb	June 11, 1891 – April 24, 1892 (first term)	318 days	First elected leader of Harvey; served as Village President.	
	Thomas McFarlane	April 25, 1892 – April 30, 1893	1 year, 5 days		
	Peter B. Lamb	May 1, 1893 – April 30, 1894 (second term)	364 days		
	H. C. Riordan	May 1, 1894 – June 2, 1895	1 year, 32 days		
	Jonathan Matthews	June 3, 1895 – April 30, 1897	1 year, 331 days	First Mayor of the City of Harvey.	
	Clark W. Ranger	May 1, 1897 – April 30, 1899	1 year, 364 days	Served two consecutive one-year terms.	
	F. A. Braley	May 1, 1899 – April 30, 1901	1 year, 364 days		
	F. G. Howland	May 1 – September 2, 1901	124 days	Resigned.	
	E. N. Flewelling	September 2, 1901 – April 30, 1903	1 year, 240 days	Completed Howland's unfinished term, then served two consecutive one-year terms.	
	Clark W. Ranger	May 1, 1903 – August 29, 1904 (third term)	1 year, 120 days	Resigned August 29, 1904; W. G. Eddy served as acting mayor April 21–August 31, 1904.	
	A. W. Campbell	September 1, 1904 – April 30, 1905	241 days		
	W. E. Kerr	May 1, 1905 – April 30, 1907 (first and second terms)	1 year, 364 days	Served two consecutive one-year terms.	
	E. N. Flewelling	May 1, 1907 – July 6, 1908 (third and fourth terms)	1 year, 66 days	Served two consecutive one-year terms.	
	W. E. Kerr	July 6, 1908 – April 30, 1909 (third term)	298 days		
	E. M. Adams	May 1, 1909 – April 30, 1913	3 years, 364 days	Served five consecutive one-year terms.	
	George H. Gibson	May 1, 1913 – April 30, 1919	5 years, 364 days	First Illinois mayor to be elected under the mayor-commission form of city government.	
	Matt Stobbs	May 1, 1919 – April 30, 1927	7 years, 364 days		
	Frank W. Bruggemann †	May 1, 1927 – January 10, 1942	14 years, 254 days	Died in office	
	Charles H. Applegate Jr.	January 10, 1942 – April 30, 1943	1 year, 110 days	Acting Mayor; appointed by council to finish the term of F. W. Bruggemann.	
	Arthur E. Turngren	May 1, 1943 – April 30, 1959	15 years, 364 days		
	William B. Kane	May 1, 1959 – April 30, 1963	3 years, 364 days		
	Elmer O. Turngren	May 1, 1963 – April 30, 1967	3 years, 364 days	Son of mayor Arthur Turngren.	
	James A. Haines	May 1, 1967 – April 30, 1983	15 years, 364 days		
	David Johnson	May 1, 1983 – April 30, 1995	11 years, 364 days	First African-American mayor of Harvey	
	Nickolas Graves	May 1, 1995 – April 30, 2003	7 years, 364 days		
	Eric J. Kellogg	May 1, 2003 – April 30, 2019	15 years, 364 days	Second African-American mayor of Harvey	
	Christopher J. Clark †	May 1, 2019 – January 30, 2026	6 years, 274 days	Third African-American mayor of Harvey; died in office.	
	Shirley Drewenski	February 23, 2026–present	270 days	Acting Mayor; appointed by council to finish the term of Christopher J. Clark who died on January 30, 2026.	

== Economy ==
Similarly to other regional communities, heavy industry dominated the Harvey economy for most of its history. Among the major employers were the Whiting Corporation, which operated in Harvey from 1894 until 2000, manufacturing cupola furnaces, overhead cranes, and locomotive repair equipment, among other products. Other prominent manufacturers included American Stove (plant operated in Harvey 1897–1948), Bliss & Laughlin (cold-rolled steel), Wyman-Gordon, and Allis-Chalmers (formerly the Buda Engine Co., which was acquired by Allis-Chalmers in 1953). Sinclair Oil (ARCO from 1969) established a research laboratory in Harvey in October 1948.

== Education ==
Harvey Public School District 152 operates public elementary schools in most of Harvey. A portion of Harvey is within the Posen-Robbins School District 143½ and a portion is within Dolton - Riverdale School District 148. Thornton Township High School District 205 operates the public high school. The portion under the Posen-Robbins School District 143½ is a part of the Bremen Community High School District 228.

There are also two private PreK - 12 schools in Harvey: Outreach Exceptional Learning Academy and Standberry Christian Academy.

Harvey is located within Illinois Community College District 510.

== Infrastructure ==
=== Transportation ===
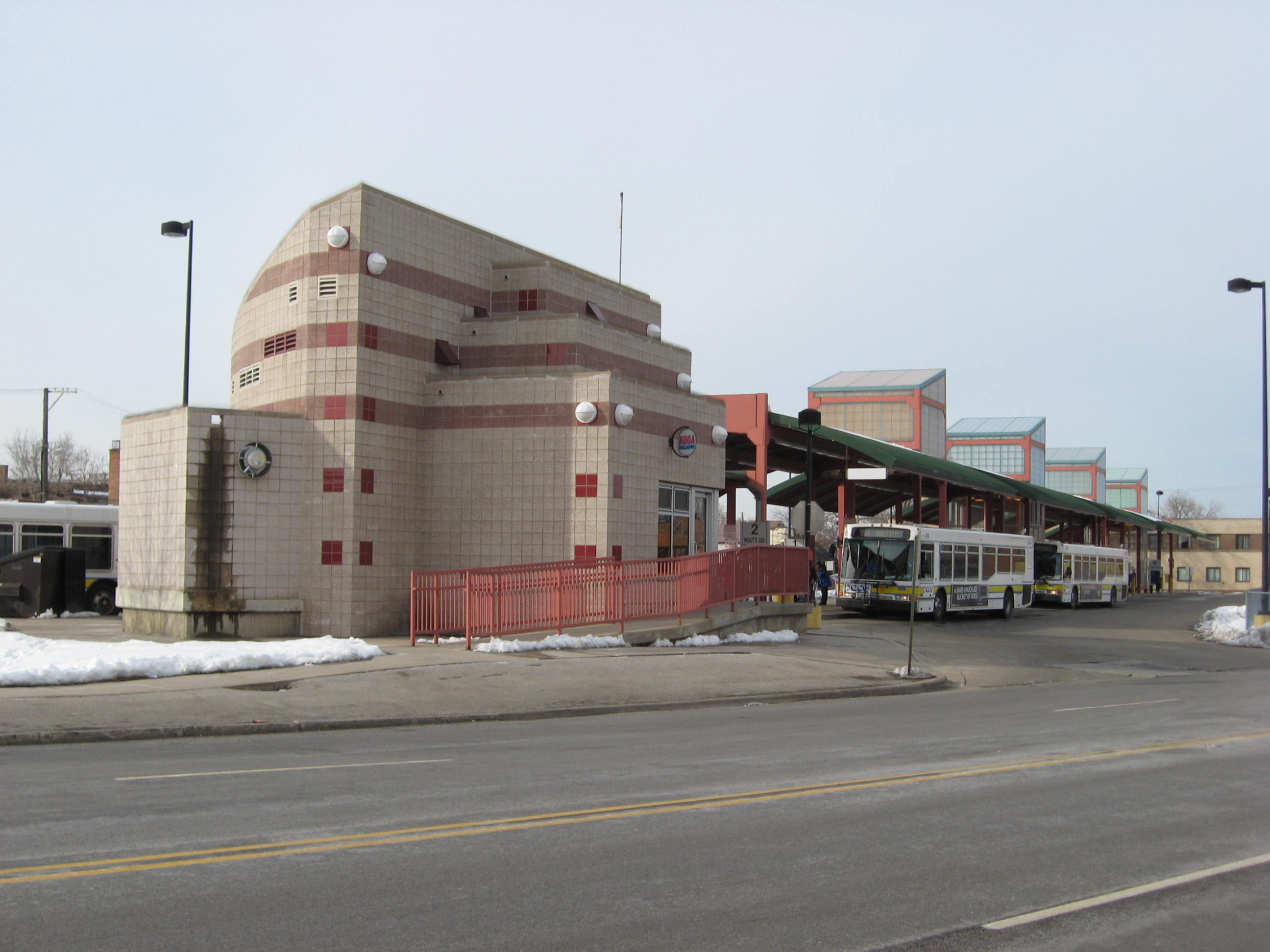
Pace Harvey Transportation Center

Harvey is served by two stations along the Metra Electric University Park line to Chicago. One is at 147th Street (a.k.a. Sibley Boulevard) and Clinton Street, and the other is at Park Avenue and 154th Street. Eleven Pace bus routes serve Harvey and the Pace Harvey Transportation Center.

Three major north–south streets in Chicago venture as far south as Harvey in some capacity. Halsted Street (Illinois Route 1) runs through the east side of town. Dixie Highway, as it is known in Harvey, is Western Avenue in Chicago. Finally, Chicago's Ashland Avenue becomes Wood Street in Harvey. The reason for this is a surveyor's error along the line where Interstate 57 is now located; Harvey's street names and numbers conform to the section lines rather than actual distance from Chicago's base lines (as indicated by the jogs in Halsted Street near 150th Street and 159th Street between Harvey and Markham, as examples). Harvey's own Ashland Avenue serves as the east–west dividing line for house numbering.

== In popular culture ==
The Dixie Square Mall, an abandoned shopping mall in Harvey, was the setting for filming of the car chase scene in The Blues Brothers.
