= Posen-Robbins School District 143½ =

School district in Illinois, United States

Address
- 14011 South Harrison Avenue Posen, Illinois, 60469; United States

District information
- Type: Public
- Grades: PreK–8
- NCES District ID: 1732370

Students and staff
- Students: 1,251

Other information
- Website: www.prsd1435.org

Posen-Robbins School District 143½ is a school district based in Posen, Illinois near Chicago, United States. The district, which serves all or portions of Posen, Robbins, Blue Island, Harvey, and Markham, is about 20 minutes of transportation away from the Chicago Loop. The district serves grades Pre-K through 8th grade and has over 1,500 students and 87 teachers.

== Demographics ==
In a 10-year period ending in 2014 the district changed from being 58% black to 58% Hispanic. The changes lead to a decrease in academic achievement. In a three-year period ending in 2013, one elementary school saw its rank drop by 130 places. As a result, the district began attempts to recruit teachers from Spain. The superintendent received training on how to read announcements in the Spanish language at school assemblies.

== Schools ==
- Thomas J. Kellar Middle School (6–8) – Robbins
- Posen Intermediate School (4–5) – Posen
- Bernice Childs Elementary School (Kindergarten – 3) – Robbins
- John Gordon Elementary School – (Kindergarten – 3) – Posen
- Delia M. Turner Elementary School (Pre-K – Kindergarten) – Crestwood
