= Kingston, Washington =

- Census-designated place
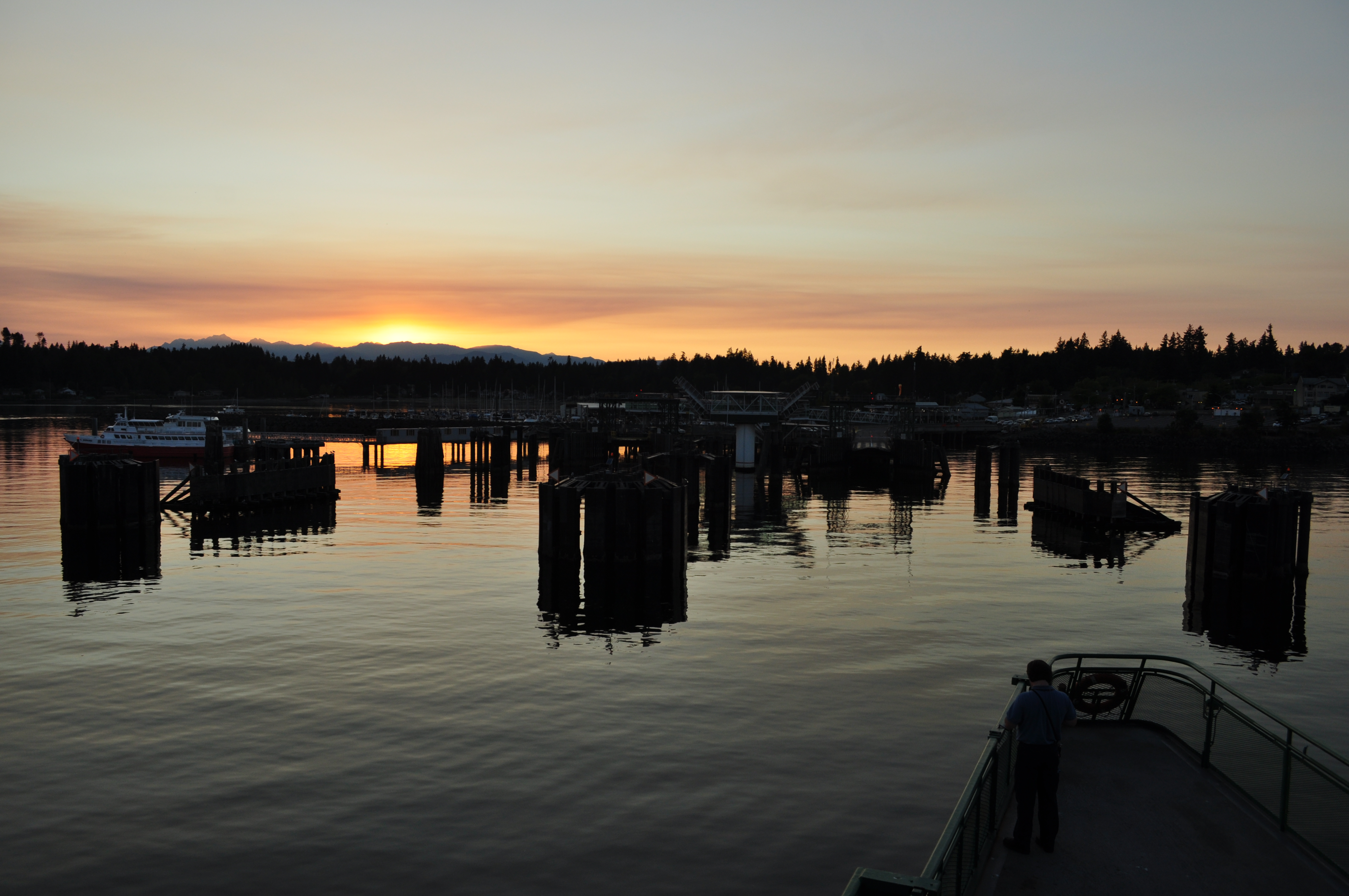
- Kingston Ferry Terminal at dusk
- Nickname: "Little City by the Sea"
- Location of Kingston, Washington
- Coordinates: 47°47′38″N 122°30′07″W
- Country: United States
- State: Washington
- County: Kitsap

Area
  - Total: 2.08 sq mi (5.39 km^{2})
  - Land: 1.87 sq mi (4.84 km^{2})
  - Water: 0.22 sq mi (0.56 km^{2})
- Elevation: 7 ft (2.1 m)

Population (2020)
  - Total: 2,515
  - Density: 1,350/sq mi (520/km^{2})
- Time zone: UTC-8 (Pacific (PST))
  - Summer (DST): UTC-7 (PDT)
- ZIP Code: 98346
- Area code(s): 360, 564
- FIPS code: 53-35870
- GNIS feature ID: 2408487

Kingston (formerly Appletree Cove) is an unincorporated community and census-designated place (CDP) in Kitsap County, Washington, United States. The population was 2,515 at the 2020 census. Kingston is along the shores of Appletree Cove and Puget Sound, and is home to a major Washington State Ferry terminal linking it to Edmonds.

== Geography ==
Kingston is located in northeastern Kitsap County at 47°47′56″N 122°29′57″W (47.798764, −122.499071), on the east side of the Kitsap Peninsula. Washington State Route 104 runs through the community from the Washington State Ferry terminal, leading northwest 7 miles (11 km) to Port Gamble. Bremerton is 26 miles (42 km) to the southwest by highway.

According to the United States Census Bureau, the Kingston CDP has a total area of 2.1 square miles (5.4 km^{2}), of which 1.9 square miles (4.8 km^{2}) are land and 0.2 square miles (0.6 km^{2}), or 10.31%, are water.

=== Climate ===
Climate data for Kingston, Washington
Month	Jan	Feb	Mar	Apr	May	Jun	Jul	Aug	Sep	Oct	Nov	Dec	Year
Record high °F (°C)	64 (18)	66 (19)	78 (26)	83 (28)	89 (32)	92 (33)	110 (43)	93 (34)	93 (34)	87 (31)	73 (23)	62 (17)	110 (43)
Mean daily maximum °F (°C)	47 (8)	50 (10)	54 (12)	59 (15)	64 (18)	70 (21)	76 (24)	76 (24)	71 (22)	60 (16)	51 (11)	46 (8)	60 (16)
Mean daily minimum °F (°C)	37 (3)	37 (3)	39 (4)	43 (6)	48 (9)	52 (11)	56 (13)	57 (14)	53 (12)	47 (8)	41 (5)	36 (2)	46 (8)
Record low °F (°C)	18 (−8)	19 (−7)	28 (−2)	32 (0)	35 (2)	42 (6)	48 (9)	47 (8)	42 (6)	29 (−2)	20 (−7)	10 (−12)	10 (−12)
Average precipitation inches (mm)	4.81 (122)	3.43 (87)	3.51 (89)	2.77 (70)	2.16 (55)	1.63 (41)	0.79 (20)	0.97 (25)	1.52 (39)	3.41 (87)	5.84 (148)	5.43 (138)	36.27 (921)

== History ==
Founded in 1853 by Benjamin Bannister, the community was originally known as "Appletree Cove". By 1880 it was a lumber town until the mill closed down in the early 20th century. Known as the "little city by the sea", Kingston is a northern gateway to the Olympic Peninsula and is the social and economic center of the north end of the Kitsap Peninsula.

=== King's Town ===
In 1869, W.S. Ladd and his wife Caroline built a cabin on Appletree Cove. Michael King then bought the cabin nine years later. He moved in along with ten oxen and ten men. They slowly logged the hills around Appletree Cove. King built many small buildings and shacks along the shore for his men and animals. In 1882, he was done and moved on. The shacks and bunkhouses were left behind and lived in by drifters, squatters and old loggers. People living in the area often referred to this as "King's Town", probably as a joke. The name slowly evolved into Kingston and stuck.

=== Resort town ===
The Kingston townsite was platted on April 24, 1890, by C.C. Calkins and Samuel B. Brierly. Calkins dreamed of Kingston as a resort town for vacationers from Seattle. Calkins called it "the Monterey of Washington". Calkins had drawings and designs for a giant hotel on the waterfront, with a boat launch, a church on the hill, and a college. After Calkins and Brierly platted the town, a lower than expected number of people showed up to settle there. Calkins then gave up and left. The town slowly grew, but not at the pace that Calkins had dreamed.

== Demographics ==
Historical population
Census	Pop.	Note	%±
2000	1,611		—
2010	2,099		30.3%
2020	2,515		19.8%

As of the census of 2000, there were 1,611 people, 685 households, and 452 families residing in the CDP. The population density was 977.2 people per square mile (377.0/km^{2}). There were 773 housing units at an average density of 468.9/sq mi (180.9/km^{2}). The racial makeup of the CDP was 91.1% White, 0.3% African American, 1.2% Native American, 2.3% Asian, 1.0% Pacific Islander, 1.6% from other races, and 2.6% from two or more races. Hispanic or Latino of any race were 2.7% of the population.

There were 685 households, out of which 30.1% had children under the age of 18 living with them, 54.9% were married couples living together, 7.3% had a female householder with no husband present, and 34.0% were non-families. 26.7% of all households were made up of individuals, and 10.2% had someone living alone who was 65 years of age or older. The average household size was 2.35 and the average family size was 2.86.

In the CDP, the population was spread out, with 23.8% under the age of 18, 4.4% from 18 to 24, 28.9% from 25 to 44, 27.7% from 45 to 64, and 15.1% who were 65 years of age or older. The median age was 41 years. For every 100 females, there were 95.3 males. For every 100 females age 18 and over, there were 87.6 males.

The median income for a household in the CDP was $40,347, and the median income for a family was $54,583. Males had a median income of $43,839 versus $25,781 for females. The per capita income for the CDP was $24,212. About 9.2% of families and 11.2% of the population were below the poverty line, including 17.9% of those under age 18 and 13.7% of those age 65 or over.

== Transportation ==
Kingston has a Washington State Ferries terminal for auto/passenger service to Edmonds.

In September 2012, due to financial losses, the Port of Kingston discontinued its SoundRunner Kingston–Seattle passenger-only system. One of the former vessels, the Spirit of Kingston, was transferred to the King County Ferry District on March 18, 2013, for service as part of the King County Water Taxi fleet. A passenger-only service was revived in November 2018 when the Kitsap Fast Ferries began service from Kingston to Seattle.

In January 2016 Kingston accepted delivery of a new modern fireboat. The new vessel is 38 feet (12 m) long, can travel at 36 knots (67 km/h), and can pump 2,700 gallons per minute. The Department of Homeland Security has provided small ports with grants to equip themselves with modern fireboats, with sealed cabins, that can also help counter other threats, like oil spills, or attacks by chemical or biological weapons. Two thirds of the cost of this fireboat, $409,813, were paid by a federal grant. The vessel also has modern infrared sensors, which can help in search and rescue missions, and search for the hot spot at the center of a fire. Kingston had a smaller, slower, less capable older 27-foot (8.2 m) fireboat. Both vessels can project fire suppressant foam, less likely to sink flaming vessels, but experience with the older vessel suggests most of the fires the new vessel will fight will be on the shore, near the water.

== Education ==
Public education is provided by the North Kitsap School District. Kingston's schools include Kingston Co-op Preschool, Gordon Elementary, Kingston Middle School, Spectrum Community School, Wolfle Elementary and Kingston High School.

== In popular culture ==
Taree is a popular American rock song by the band Soundgarden named after the Taree neighborhood in Kingston.
