= North Kitsap School District =

School District in Kitsap County, Washington

North Kitsap School District 400 is the school district serving the northern portion of Kitsap County, including the communities of Poulsbo, Keyport, Port Gamble, Hansville, Indianola, Suquamish, and Kingston, Washington.

== Poulsbo Schools ==
Poulsbo is home to three elementary schools, one middle school, and one high school.

The elementary schools located in Poulsbo include Pearson Elementary, Poulsbo Elementary and Vinland Elementary; the secondary schools include Poulsbo Middle School, North Kitsap High School, and Kingston High School.

Formerly, Breidablik Elementary was part of the available elementary schools, but was closed due to a decision by the North Kitsap School Board, later upheld by the Kitsap County Superior Court.

=== North Kitsap High School ===
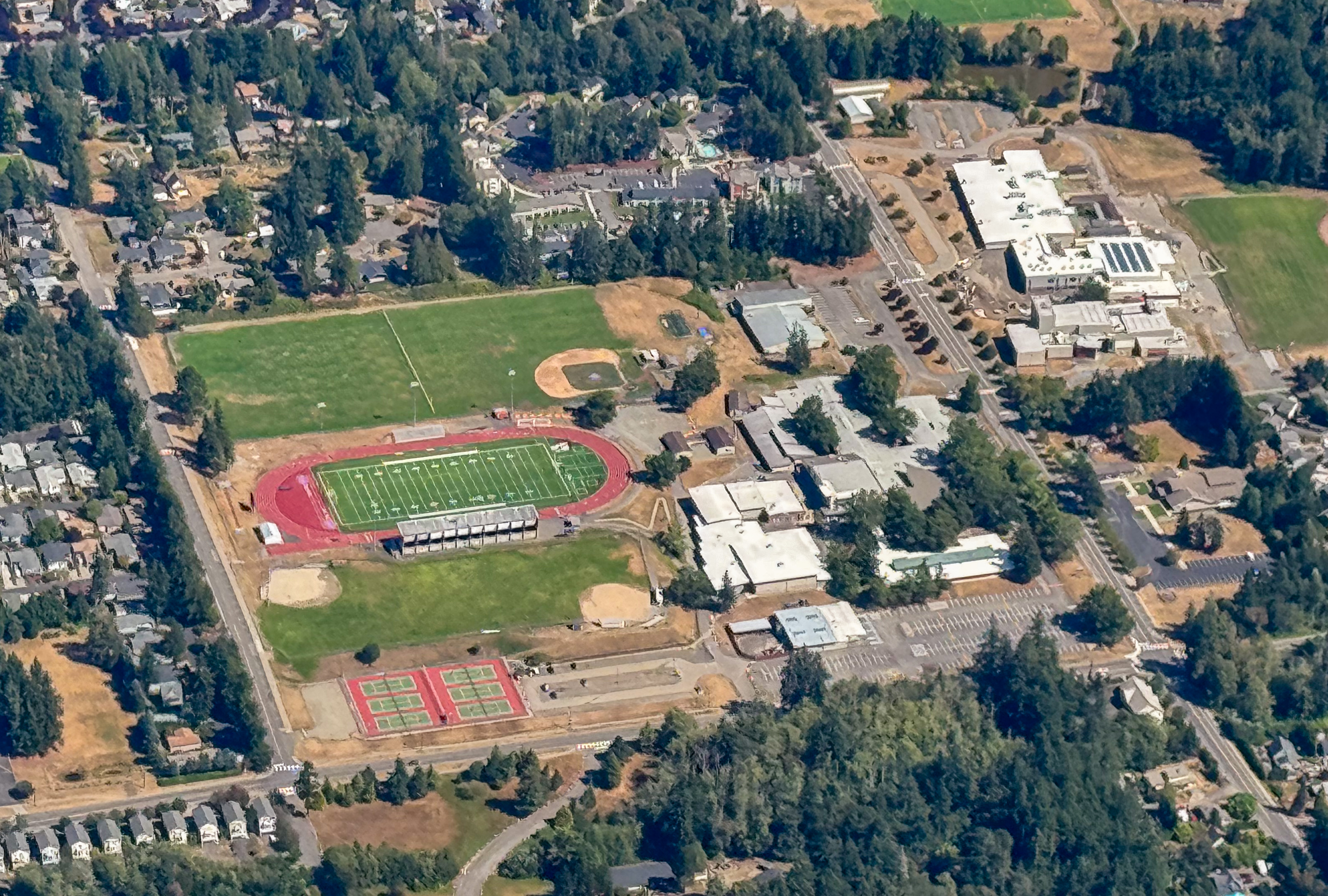
North Kitsap High School

North Kitsap High School finished undergoing renovations in spring 2009, and now provides students with a beautiful campus that features a brand new cafeteria, repaved walkways, landscaping and decorative touches, trees and other plants, and more. There are currently 74 teachers and three counselors. The school is home to about 1,100 students.

== Kingston Schools ==
Kingston is home to many public schools such as Wolfle Elementary, Gordon Elementary, Kingston Middle School, Kingston High School and Spectrum Community School. These are all a part of North Kitsap School District.

=== Richard Gordon Elementary ===
Richard F. Gordon Elementary School is a Kindergarten through 5th grade public school in Kingston, Washington. Richard Gordon Elementary is the location of the regular and two additional programs that students from the North Kitsap School District can attend. The school is named after NASA astronaut Richard F. Gordon, an alumnus of nearby North Kitsap High School, who orbited the Moon in 1969 on Apollo 12.

==== Options ====
Options is a parent involved, alternative learning program for grades K-8. It is currently located at Wolfle Elementary. There is a large drama component, including multiple student plays each year. The Options program was founded in 1989.

=== Wolfle Elementary ===
David H. Wolfle is a Kindergarten through 5th grade public school in Kingston, Washington. It is the location of the Options program.

=== Kingston Middle School ===
Kingston Middle School is a middle school located in Kingston, Washington. Located on West Kingston Road, the school was established in 1990. The school has sixth, seventh, and eighth grade classes. In 2007, this school was changed from a junior high into a middle school.

=== Kingston High School ===
Kingston High School is a public high school in Kingston, Washington. The school opened as the second High school in the North Kitsap School District. The school enrolls students grades 9-12.

== Suquamish Schools ==
Suquamish is home to one elementary school. Suquamish Elementary is the only school in this region of the North Kitsap School District.
