= Posen, Illinois =

- Village
- coat of arms
- Motto: "Peace – Pride – Progress"
- Location of Posen in Cook County, Illinois.

- Location within Greater Chicago Location within Illinois Location within the United States
- Coordinates: 41°37′42″N 87°41′9″W
- Country: United States
- State: Illinois
- County: Cook
- Township: Bremen, Thornton
- Incorporated: 1900

Government
  - President: Frank A. Podbielniak

Area
  - Total: 1.17 sq mi (3.03 km^{2})
  - Land: 1.17 sq mi (3.03 km^{2})
  - Water: 0 sq mi (0.00 km^{2}) 0%

Population (2020)
  - Total: 5,632
  - Density: 4,817.7/sq mi (1,860.12/km^{2})
- ZIP code(s): 60469
- Area code(s): 708
- FIPS code: 17-61314
- Website: www.villageofposen.org

Posen is a village and south suburb of Chicago in Cook County, Illinois, United States. Posen is the German language name for the western Polish city of Poznań. The population of the village was 5,632 at the 2020 census.

== History ==
The area that is now Posen was settled by farmers, mainly of Dutch and German origin, in the second half of the 19th century. In 1893 a Chicago-based real estate firm hired 75 agents in the Polish-speaking areas of Germany to sell land to Poles seeking to emigrate to the United States. Over the next few years the village emerged as a place largely inhabited by factory workers, mainly employed at nearby Harvey, who also had room on their lots for gardens. In 1894 the Roman Catholic Archdiocese of Chicago established a mission to serve the Polish residents of Posen, which was elevated to parish status as St. Stanislaus the Martyr in 1898 (the church permanently closed in 2022).

In the 1930s the population of Posen was 98% of Polish origin, and in 1960 only 0.1% of the population was identified in the census as being not white, or 4 of the 4,513 inhabitants. In 1963 there were 7% black students that attended the Posen School. In 1990 Posen, having fallen to 4,226 inhabitants, was still 94.5% white, a large portion of this population being Polish. About 4% of the population identified as being both white and Hispanic, for an overall 7.3% or 310 people identifying as being Hispanic. In 2010 3,171 residents of Posen identified as Hispanic, representing the expansion of the Hispanic population to 10 times what it had been 20 years before (or an increase of more than 900% over 10 years). In the same time period the number of African American residents of the village increased from 60 (or 1.4% of the population) to 1,035. This means that the percentage rate of growth of the African American population of Posen over the last 20 years has been greater than that of the Hispanic population. While as late as 2004 the Encyclopedia of Chicago still referred to Posen as "predominantly Polish American" even then an actual examination of the 2000 census ancestry report would have shown that only a quarter of the population claimed to have Polish ancestry.

== Geography ==
Posen is located at 41°37′42″N 87°41′9″W (41.628234, -87.685723).

According to the 2010 census, Posen has a total area of 1.17 square miles (3.03 km^{2}), all land.

== Demographics ==
Historical population
Census	Pop.	Note	%±
1910	343		—
1920	947		176.1%
1930	1,329		40.3%
1940	1,386		4.3%
1950	1,795		29.5%
1960	4,517		151.6%
1970	5,498		21.7%
1980	4,642		−15.6%
1990	4,226		−9.0%
2000	4,730		11.9%
2010	5,987		26.6%
2020	5,632		−5.9%
U.S. Decennial Census; 2010 2020

=== Racial and ethnic composition ===
Posen village, Illinois – Racial and ethnic composition Note: the US Census treats Hispanic/Latino as an ethnic category. This table excludes Latinos from the racial categories and assigns them to a separate category. Hispanics/Latinos may be of any race.
Race / Ethnicity (NH = Non-Hispanic)	Pop 2000	Pop 2010	Pop 2020	% 2000	% 2010	% 2020
White alone (NH)	3,141	1,684	1,120	66.41%	28.13%	19.89%
Black or African American alone (NH)	396	1,023	916	8.37%	17.09%	16.26%
Native American or Alaska Native alone (NH)	9	14	6	0.19%	0.23%	0.11%
Asian alone (NH)	11	20	31	0.23%	0.33%	0.55%
Pacific Islander alone (NH)	0	6	0	0.00%	0.10%	0.00%
Other race alone (NH)	7	5	11	0.15%	0.08%	0.20%
Mixed race or Multiracial (NH)	79	64	90	1.67%	1.07%	1.60%
Hispanic or Latino (any race)	1,087	3,171	3,458	22.98%	52.96%	61.40%
Total	4,730	5,987	5,632	100.00%	100.00%	100.00%

=== 2020 census ===
As of the 2020 census, Posen had a population of 5,632. The median age was 34.6 years. 25.6% of residents were under the age of 18 and 10.3% were 65 years of age or older. For every 100 females, there were 103.7 males, and for every 100 females age 18 and over, there were 101.5 males.

100.0% of residents lived in urban areas, while 0.0% lived in rural areas.

There were 1,773 households in Posen, of which 44.6% had children under the age of 18 living in them. Of all households, 47.2% were married-couple households, 20.4% were households with a male householder and no spouse or partner present, and 25.8% were households with a female householder and no spouse or partner present. About 20.3% of all households were made up of individuals, and 7.5% had someone living alone who was 65 years of age or older.

The population density was 4,817.79 inhabitants per square mile (1,860.16/km^{2}). There were 1,920 housing units at an average density of 1,642.43 per square mile (634.15/km^{2}). Of the housing units, 7.7% were vacant. The homeowner vacancy rate was 1.5%, and the rental vacancy rate was 13.4%.

=== Income and poverty ===
The median income for a household in the village was $47,378, and the median income for a family was $63,068. Males had a median income of $21,956 versus $24,053 for females. The per capita income for the village was $17,927. About 8.9% of families and 10.6% of the population were below the poverty line, including 7.1% of those under age 18 and 5.3% of those age 65 or over.

== Government ==
Posen is in Illinois's 1st congressional district.

== Education ==
Posen-Robbins School District 143½ serves the majority of Posen, while a portion is in the West Harvey-Dixmoor Public School District 147. The former portion is also in the Bremen Community High School District 228, while the latter portion is also in the Thornton Township High School District 205.

The Roman Catholic Archdiocese of Chicago operated St. Stanislaus Bishop and Martyr School in Posen from its opening circa 1893 until it closed in 2006. Its final enrollment was 142, and the small number of students was the reason for its closure.

== Transportation ==
Pace provides bus service on routes 349, 354 and 359 connecting Posen to destinations across the Southland. The Grand Trunk Western Line from Chicago to Port Huron runs through Posen.

== Notable person ==
- Don Kolloway, infielder for the Chicago White Sox, Detroit Tigers and Philadelphia Athletics; born in Posen
