= Washington State Route 300 =

State highway in Mason County, Washington, US

State Route 300

- Map of Mason County in western Washington with SR 300 highlighted in red

Route information
- Auxiliary route of SR 3
- Maintained by WSDOT
- Length: 3.35 mi (5.39 km)
- Existed: 1964–present

Major junctions
- West end: Belfair State Park
- East end: SR 3 in Belfair

Location
- Country: United States
- State: Washington
- Counties: Mason

Highway system
- State highways in Washington; Interstate; US; State; Scenic; Pre-1964; 1964 renumbering; Former
← SR 292	→ SR 302

State Route 300 (SR 300) is a short state highway in Mason County, in the U.S. state of Washington. It extends 3.35 miles (5.39 km) from Belfair State Park to SR 3 in the community of Belfair. The route serves as a connector from Belfair State Park to Belfair and SR 3. The highway was Secondary State Highway 21C (SSH 21C) from 1957 until 1964.

== Route description ==
SR 300 runs 3.35 miles (5.39 km) from Belfair State Park to SR 3 in the community of Belfair. The route serves as a connector from Belfair State Park to Belfair and SR 3. WSDOT has found that more than 11,000 motorists utilize the road daily before the interchange with SR 3 based on annual average daily traffic (AADT) data. SR 300 starts at the entrance to Belfair State Park west of Belfair. From the state park, the highway goes northeast along the coastline of the Hood Canal to Belfair, and turns south to merge onto SR 3.

== History ==
The shield of SSH 21C

When the Primary and Secondary Highways were realigned in 1957, the current SR 300 became Secondary State Highway 21C (SSH 21C). SSH 21C became SR 300 in 1964 during the 1964 highway renumbering, in which the Washington State Department of Transportation (WSDOT) replaced the previous system of Primary and Secondary Highways with a new system called State Routes, which is still in use today.

== Major intersections ==
The entire route is in Mason County.

Location	mi	km	Destinations	Notes
	0.00	0.00	Belfair State Park	
Belfair	3.35	5.39	SR 3 – Bremerton, Shelton	
1.000 mi = 1.609 km; 1.000 km = 0.621 mi
