= Washington State Route 304 =

State highway in northwestern Washington, US

State Route 304

- Map of western Washington with SR 304 highlighted in red and with its ferry route highlighted in dashed green

Route information
- Auxiliary route of SR 3
- Maintained by WSDOT
- Length: 3.14 mi (5.05 km) Mileage does not include ferry route
- Existed: 1964–present

Major junctions
- West end: SR 3 near Bremerton
- SR 303 in Bremerton
- East end: SR 519 at Colman Dock in Seattle

Location
- Country: United States
- State: Washington
- Counties: Kitsap, King

Highway system
- State highways in Washington; Interstate; US; State; Scenic; Pre-1964; 1964 renumbering; Former
← SR 303	→ SR 305

State Route 304 (SR 304) is a state highway in Kitsap County, Washington, United States. It connects SR 3, a regional freeway, to the Puget Sound Naval Shipyard and downtown Bremerton. The designation of SR 304 continues onto the Seattle–Bremerton ferry operated by Washington State Ferries to Colman Dock in Downtown Seattle, terminating at SR 519 on Alaskan Way.

The highway was built in the early 20th century, running along Sinclair Inlet and through the town of Charleston before reaching Bremerton. It was added to the state highway system in 1915 as part of the Navy Yard Highway (State Road 21) and was later incorporated into Primary State Highway 21 (PSH 21). A branch of PSH 21 connecting the main highway to the Bremerton ferry terminal was added to the state system in 1961 and was renumbered to SR 304 in 1964.

SR 304 originally terminated on the northwest side of the naval shipyard until SR 3 was relocated onto a bypass of Bremerton in the 1970s, necessitating a southwest extension. The highway was briefly removed from the state system by the state legislature from 1991 to 1993 and was extended over the Seattle–Bremerton ferry in 1994. A major improvement project began in 1998, building a new boulevard to serve SR 304, widening the highway through Bremerton, and adding a short tunnel for westbound traffic from the ferry terminal.

== Route description ==
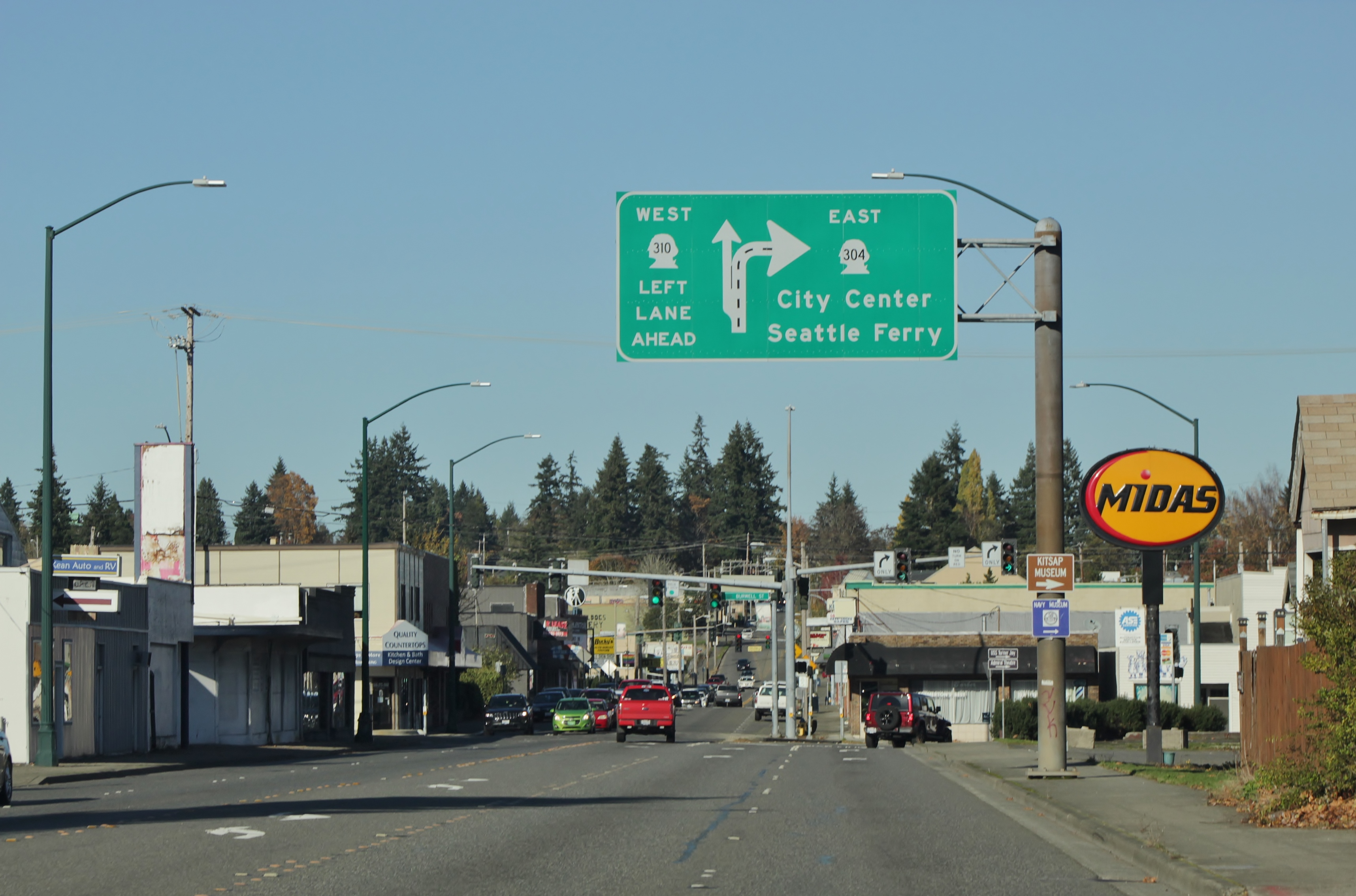
SR 304 at its intersection with SR 310 in Bremerton

SR 304 begins at a partial interchange with SR 3 in the community of Navy Yard City, southwest of downtown Bremerton. The interchange, adjacent to a wastewater treatment plant, lacks a ramp from southbound SR 3 to SR 304, but provides access in the remaining three directions. The five-lane highway (including a westbound high-occupancy vehicle lane during peak hours) carrying SR 304 travels northeast on Charleston Boulevard along a section of the Puget Sound and Pacific Railroad (owned by the U.S. Navy) and the shore of the Sinclair Inlet. It enters Bremerton and turns north to follow the western boundary of the Puget Sound Naval Shipyard and the Bremerton Annex of Naval Base Kitsap. SR 304 passes a Kitsap Transit busyard before shifting east onto North Callow Avenue and intersecting SR 310, which travels west on Kitsap Way to an interchange with SR 3.

From its junction with SR 310, the highway turns east onto Burwell Street and continues through a residential neighborhood on the north side of the naval base. SR 304 then intersects SR 303 at Warren Avenue and enters downtown Bremerton, where it forms the northern and eastern boundary of the naval shipyard. At Park Avenue, the highway passes over a pedestrian tunnel connecting to the shipyard and splits into a couplet: the eastbound lanes turn onto Pacific Avenue and continue into the Bremerton ferry terminal, while westbound traffic departing from the ferry terminal use a 959-foot (292 m) tunnel. The ferry terminal, at the south end of downtown near the Puget Sound Navy Museum, is divided into two levels with a passenger waiting area and bus bays atop the vehicle holding area.

Under state code, SR 304 continues onto the Seattle–Bremerton ferry operated by Washington State Ferries, a 14-nautical-mile (16 mi; 26 km) route that takes approximately 60 minutes. The corridor is also served by Kitsap Fast Ferries, a passenger ferry operated by Kitsap Transit, and terminates at Colman Dock in Downtown Seattle, which is also served by a state ferry to Bainbridge Island carrying SR 305 as well as several passenger ferries. SR 304 and SR 305 continue through the Seattle terminal and formally terminate at an intersection with SR 519 on Alaskan Way.

The entire highway is as part of the National Highway System, a national network of roads identified as important to the national economy, defense, and mobility; it is also listed as part of the Strategic Highway Network by the U.S. Department of Defense. The Washington state government has also designated it as a Highway of Statewide Significance. SR 304 is maintained by the Washington State Department of Transportation (WSDOT), which conducts an annual survey on state highways to measure traffic volume in terms of annual average daily traffic. Average traffic volumes on the highway in 2016 ranged from a minimum of 1,100 vehicles at the Bremerton ferry terminal to a maximum of 30,000 vehicles at the SR 3 interchange. The Seattle–Bremerton route operated by Washington State Ferries carried 2.46 million total passengers in 2019, including over 650,000 vehicles.

== History ==
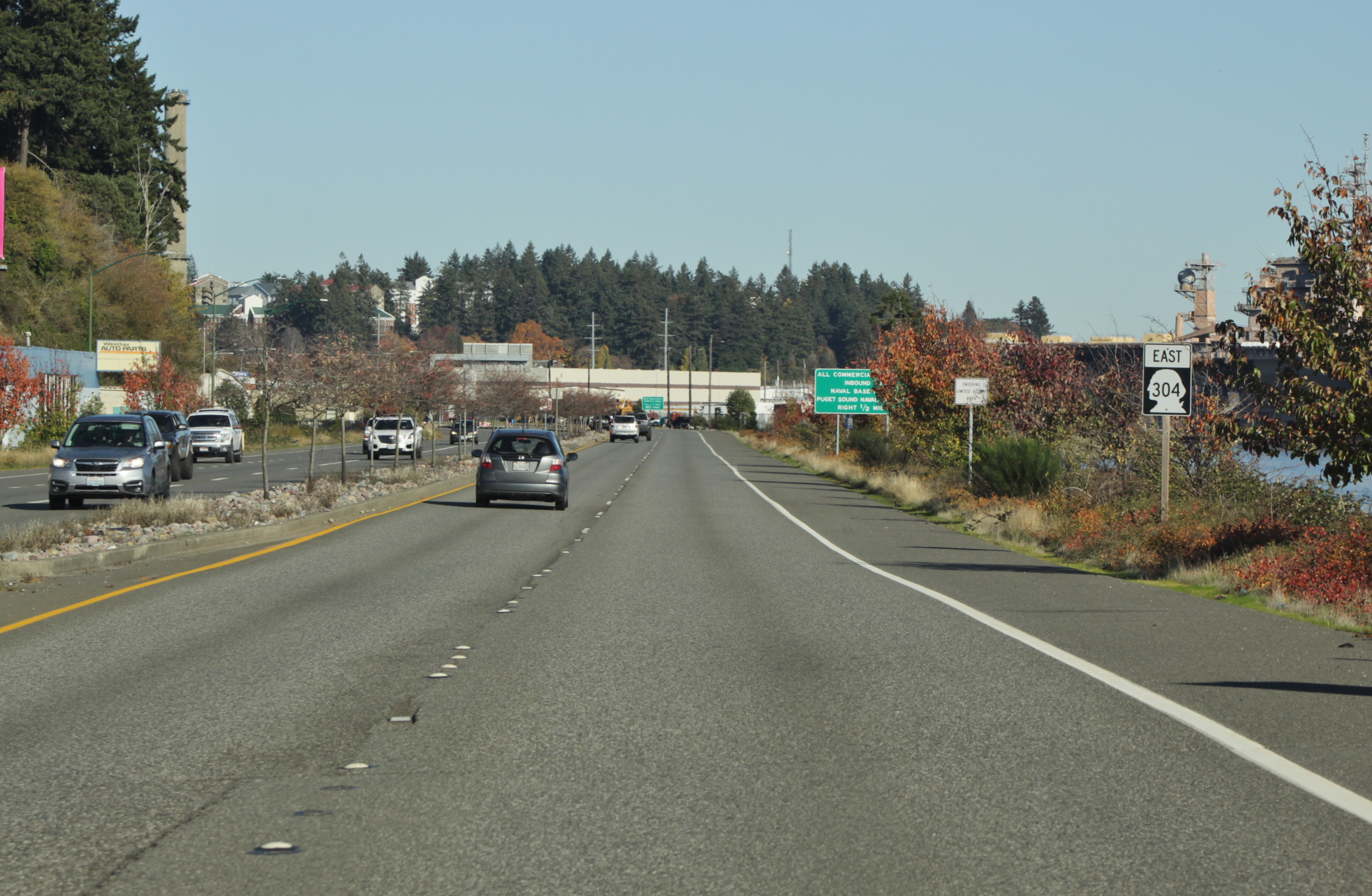
SR 304 eastbound approaching the Puget Sound Naval Shipyard on a section of the former Navy Yard Highway

The Puget Sound Naval Shipyard was established by the U.S. Navy in September 1891 near the future townsite of Bremerton, which was platted three months later. The western side of Bremerton and neighboring Charleston were served at the turn of the 20th century by Washington Boulevard, which continued southwest along Sinclair Inlet to Gorst as an unpaved road. In 1915, local businessmen lobbied for the construction of the Navy Yard Highway to connect Bremerton with the Olympic Highway in Union, Poulsbo, and Kingston. The state legislature added the corridor to the state highway system that year as State Road 21 and appropriated funds to survey the route.

The state legislature appropriated additional funds to design and construct State Road 21 in its 1917 and 1919 sessions, while the Union–Charleston was incorporated into the system as the Navy Yard Highway. The two highways were among the first in Washington to receive federal funding under the Federal Aid Road Act of 1916. Construction on the section through Charleston and western Bremerton began in late 1917 and the entire Navy Yard Highway was dedicated on June 12, 1923.

The Navy Yard Highway was re-designated as State Road 14 and extended through Charleston in 1923, replacing a section of State Road 21, which remained a secondary state highway. State Road 21 was elevated to primary state highway status in 1929 and was re-designated as Primary State Highway 21 (PSH 21) during a 1937 restructuring of the highway system. A branch of PSH 21, connecting the main highway at Charleston to the Bremerton ferry terminal was added to the state highway system in 1961. The state ferry system was established in 1951 by acquiring the domestic operations of the Puget Sound Navigation Company, which included the Seattle–Bremerton ferry, notably served by the MV Kalakala (built in 1935).

PSH 21 was replaced by SR 3 in the 1964 state highway renumbering, while the Bremerton branch became SR 304. Following the construction of the Bremerton freeway bypass for SR 3 in the early 1970s, SR 304 was extended southwest through Charleston and Navy Yard City to its modern terminus. The junction with SR 3 was originally a signalized intersection until it was converted into an interchange in 1991 with the construction of a southbound flyover ramp. The ramp was initially two lanes wide, but was reduced to a single lane in 1997 to improve merging for traffic on SR 3.

The highway was initially routed through downtown Bremerton on 6th Street, but was later realigned onto Burwell Street in the 1980s. In 1991, the state legislature inadvertently removed SR 304 from the state highway system; SR 306 had been intended to be removed and transferred to Kitsap County. WSDOT continued to maintain SR 304 and it was re-added to the state highway system in 1993. The Seattle–Bremerton ferry was added to SR 304 the following year as part of the incorporation of the ferry system into existing state highways by the legislature.

=== Bremerton Gateway and other projects ===
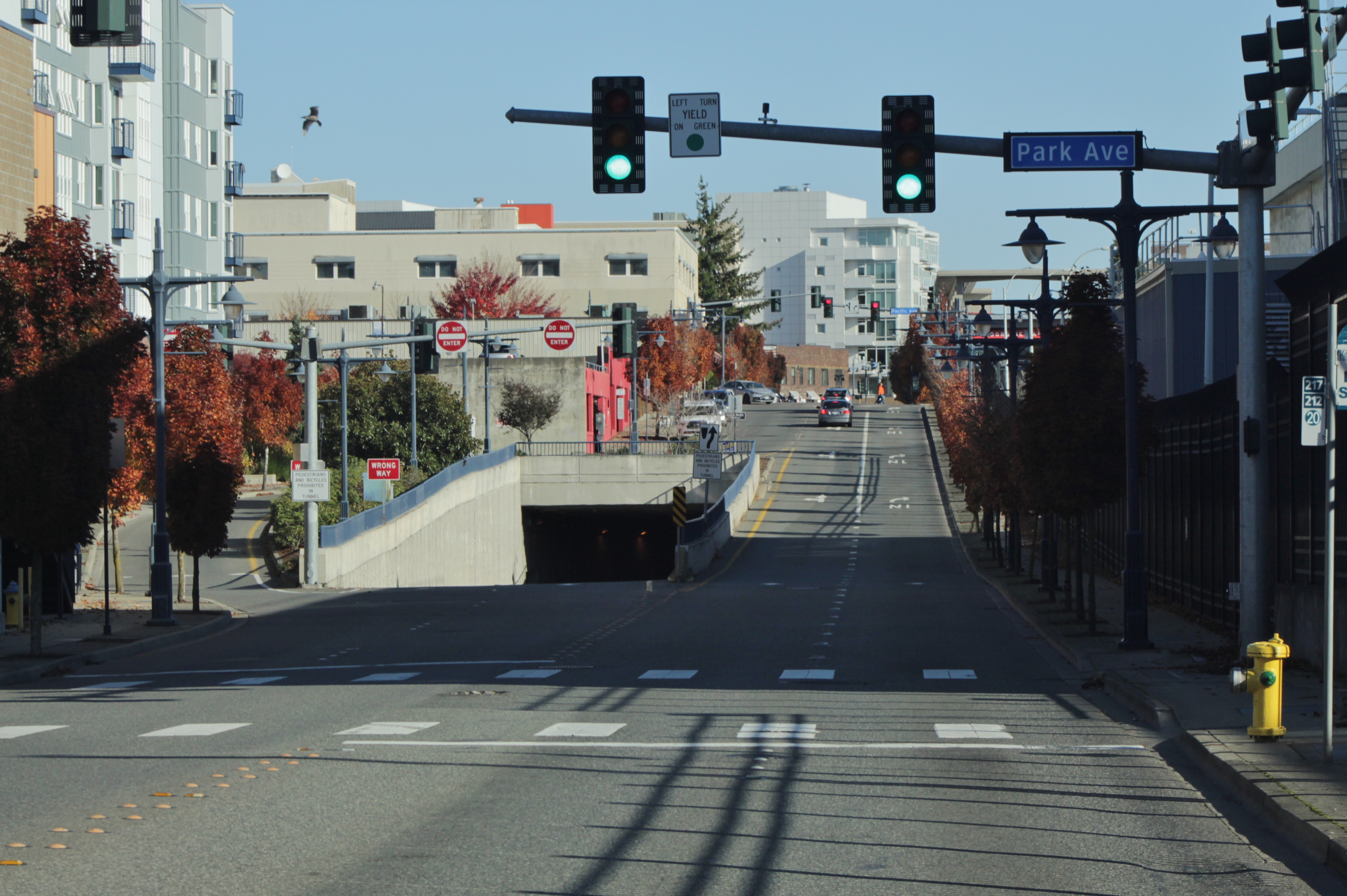
The western portal of the Downtown Bremerton tunnel on SR 304

The southernmost section of SR 304 through Navy Yard City and Charleston was rebuilt in the 1990s as part of the Bremerton Gateway project, originally estimated to cost $37.9 million (equivalent to $66.9 million in 2024 dollars) and funded with state and federal grants. It was planned alongside a new building for the city's ferry terminal and the western expansion of the naval shipyard, which would close a section of Callow Avenue. The Bremerton city government considered a new highway connecting to SR 3 at the Loxie Eagans Boulevard interchange, but instead chose a landscaped four-lane boulevard (named Charleston Boulevard) west of Callow Avenue to carry SR 304. The new boulevard would connect with Burwell Street, which would remain a two-way street after earlier proposals to create a one-way couplet with 6th Street were rejected.

A total of 150 properties were acquired for the Bremerton Gateway project, which began construction in October 1998 with demolition to make way for a widened Burwell Street and other downtown changes. In early 1999, Burwell Street reopened with four lanes and a pair of one-way streets were created from Pacific and Washington streets at the ferry terminal. The first section of Charleston Boulevard opened to traffic in February 2001, replacing a one-block turn onto Farragut Street to reach Callow Avenue by following the shipyard's outer fence. The expansion of Callow Avenue at the north end of the boulevard was completed in June 2001 and included a traffic signal to allow eastbound traffic to flow onto Burwell Street.

The third phase of the Bremerton Gateway project, widening SR 304 between SR 3 and the shipyard, was delayed due to a funding gap that was filled with the state's 2003 gas tax. The highway's westbound high-occupancy vehicle lane (HOV lane), first proposed in 1996, was opened to traffic in July 2008. Traffic bound for southbound SR 3 was initially required to merge into the HOV lane until the flyover ramp at the interchange was re-striped for two lanes in 2018. A 959-foot-long (292 m) tunnel in downtown Bremerton opened on July 6, 2009, allowing westbound traffic from the ferry terminal to bypass several congested intersections on Washington Avenue; it took two years to construct and cost $54 million. The tunnel's opening was criticized for impacting traffic for downtown businesses, but the lower vehicle volumes contributed to the area's walkability.

== Major intersections ==
County	Location	mi	km	Destinations	Notes
Kitsap		0.00	0.00	SR 3 – Shelton, Silverdale	Interchange
Kitsap	Bremerton	1.66	2.67	SR 310 west (Callow Avenue North) – Silverdale	
Kitsap	Bremerton	2.62	4.22	SR 303 north (Warren Avenue)	
Puget Sound		3.14	5.05	Seattle–Bremerton ferry	
King	Seattle			Colman Dock – Bainbridge Ferry (SR 305) / Alaskan Way (SR 519)	
1.000 mi = 1.609 km; 1.000 km = 0.621 mi
