= Washington State Route 339 =

State highway in northwestern Washington, US

State Route 339
- Seattle–Vashon Island PO ferry

Route information
- Auxiliary route of SR 3
- Maintained by Washington State Ferries
- Length: 8.5 nmi (15.7 km; 9.8 mi)
- Existed: 1994–present

Major junctions
- West end: SR 160 – Vashon Heights ferry terminal
- East end: SR 519 – Seattle Pier 50 ferry terminal

Location
- Country: United States
- State: Washington

Highway system
- State highways in Washington; Interstate; US; State; Scenic; Pre-1964; 1964 renumbering; Former
- King County Ferry District
← SR 310	→ US 395

State Route 339 (SR 339) is a 8.5-nautical-mile-long (9.8 mi; 15.7 km) state highway in the U.S. state of Washington. It is designated on a former state-run ferry route that connected Vashon Island's Vashon Heights ferry terminal to downtown Seattle's Pier 50, via a passenger-only ferry, the MV Skagit. The ferry was financed by the King County Ferry District (KCFD) and tolls collected at Pier 50. Despite being part of the KCFD, the ferry was operated by Washington State Ferries (WSF). SR 339 was one of only four ferry routes providing access to and from Vashon Island, and had the lowest annual average ridership of the four routes. The state of Washington took over the operation of the ferry route in 1951, and designated it SR 339 in 1994. The ferry was discontinued in 2006 and was replaced by a King County Water Taxi route.

== Route description ==
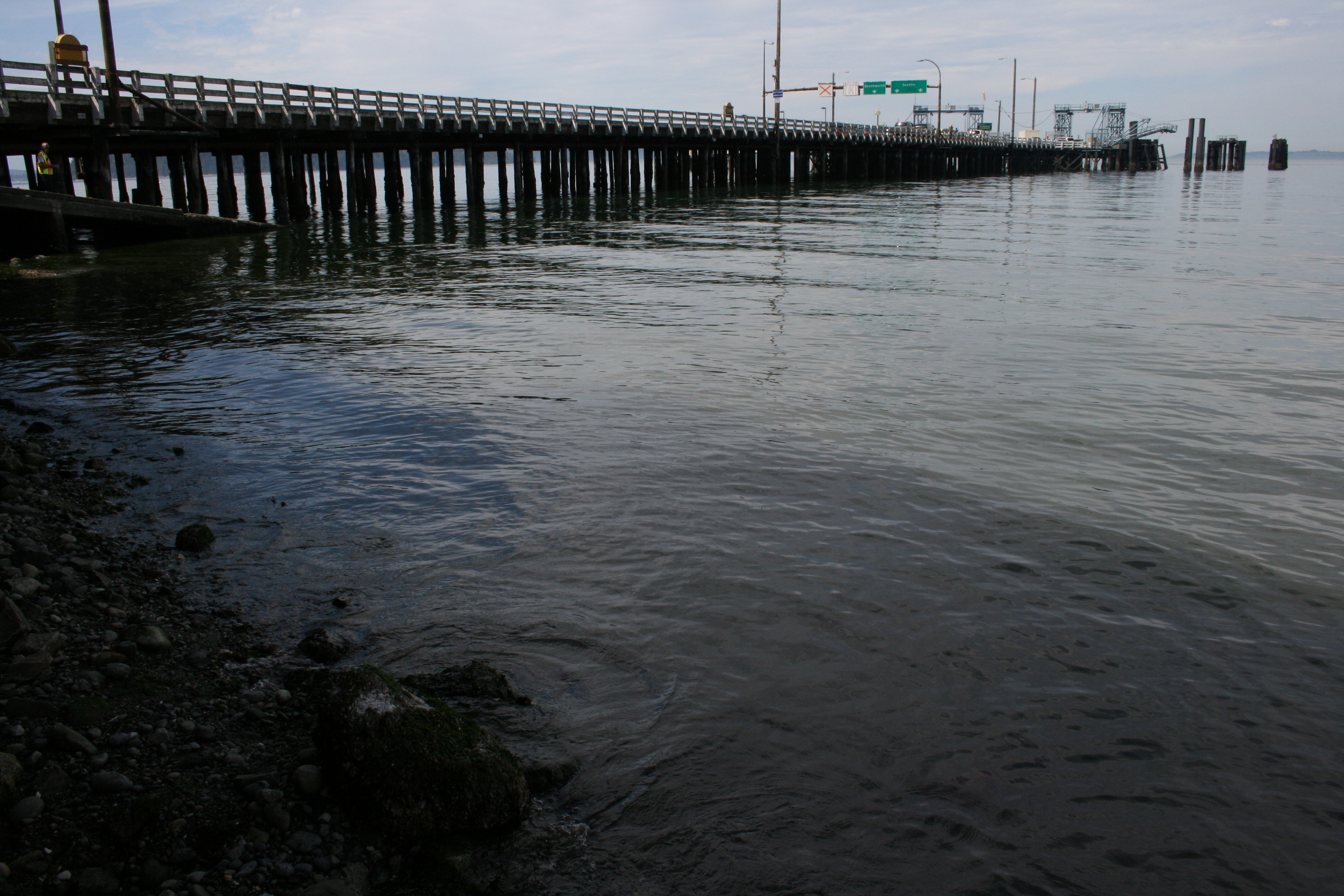
The southern terminus of SR 339 at the Vashon Heights ferry terminal

The entire route of SR 339 was in Puget Sound and was served by the MV Skagit. The passenger-only ferry started out from the Vashon Heights ferry terminal on Vashon Island and headed in a northerly direction, passing Blake Island State Park on the west. It briefly sailed into Kitsap County before the route turned east and passed the Alki Point Light and Alki Point before entering Elliott Bay, and docking at WSF's Pier 50, just south of Colman Dock, where the rest of the WSF operated ferries dock in Seattle.

Traveling at a top speed of 25 knots (29 mph), the MV Skagit made the crossing in about 35 minutes. There were three crossings each direction Monday–Friday, and no service on Saturday or Sunday.

Vashon Island is only connected to the rest of the region via three different WSF ferries departing from the Vashon dock, the other route departing from the Tahlequah dock on the south end of the island. SR 339 was the only passenger-only ferry that served the island; the other three ferries are auto ferries.

== History ==
Ferries have provided transportation to and from Vashon Island since the days of the Seattle Mosquito Fleet, but the state government took over the operation of the Vashon Island ferry on June 1, 1951. The MV Skagit was built in 1989, and the ferry began service on the Seattle–Vashon Island route on April 23, 1990. The route was designated as a state highway, along with the rest of the state ferry system, in 1994. In 2003 the average daily ridership was 827 passengers per day, based on a five-day week, compared to 1,015 passengers on average when the route operated on a six-day schedule in 1999. This number has decreased in 2004, with an average of 529 passengers per day traveling on the ferry. The passenger-only service between Vashion Island and Seattle ended in 2006. WSF operated and maintained the MV Skagit, but by July 2009 the KCFD was to assume all responsibilities of the operation. The route no longer received state funding, and King County was to be responsible for all costs of the route to be funded by property taxes. The MV Skagit was sold in 2011 to a ferry operator in Tanzania, where it connected Zanzibar to the mainland until it sank on July 18, 2012.

The Seattle–Vashon Island run was transferred to the King County Ferry District in 2007, now operated as a King County Water Taxi route.

== Tolls ==
Tolls were collected on trips departing Pier 50; return trips to Seattle were not charged. The adult toll was $8.70, with bicycles assessed an additional $1.00 toll. Wave2Go is a prepaid toll system which allowed commuters to purchase either 10 ride cards or monthly passes.

== Major intersections ==
The entire route was located in Puget Sound, King County.

Location	mi	km	Destinations	Notes
Vashon Heights	0.0	0.0	To SR 160 (SE Sedgewick Road) – Vashon, Southworth	Access to Southworth via Vashon–Southworth ferry
Seattle	9.8	15.8	SR 519 to SR 99 (Alaskan Way Viaduct) – Seattle Pier 50	
1.000 mi = 1.609 km; 1.000 km = 0.621 mi
