= Washington State Route 310 =

State highway in Kitsap County, Washington, US

State Route 310

- SR 310 highlighted in red

Route information
- Auxiliary route of SR 3
- Maintained by WSDOT
- Length: 1.84 mi (2.96 km)
- Existed: 1991–present

Major junctions
- West end: SR 3 in Bremerton
- East end: SR 304 in Bremerton

Location
- Country: United States
- State: Washington
- Counties: Kitsap

Highway system
- State highways in Washington; Interstate; US; State; Scenic; Pre-1964; 1964 renumbering; Former
← SR 308	→ SR 339

State Route 310 (SR 310) is a 1.84-mile-long (2.96 km) state highway in the U.S. state of Washington, serving the city of Bremerton in Kitsap County. The highway travels east within Bremerton from an interchange with SR 3 to an intersection with SR 304 as Kitsap Way and Callow Avenue. SR 310 was established in 1991, following the former alignment of SR 3 on city streets in Bremerton before the construction of its current freeway in the 1960s and 1970s. The highway was codified in 1915 as State Road 21 in 1915 and Primary State Highway 21 (PSH 21) in 1937 before becoming SR 3 during the 1964 highway renumbering.

== Route description ==
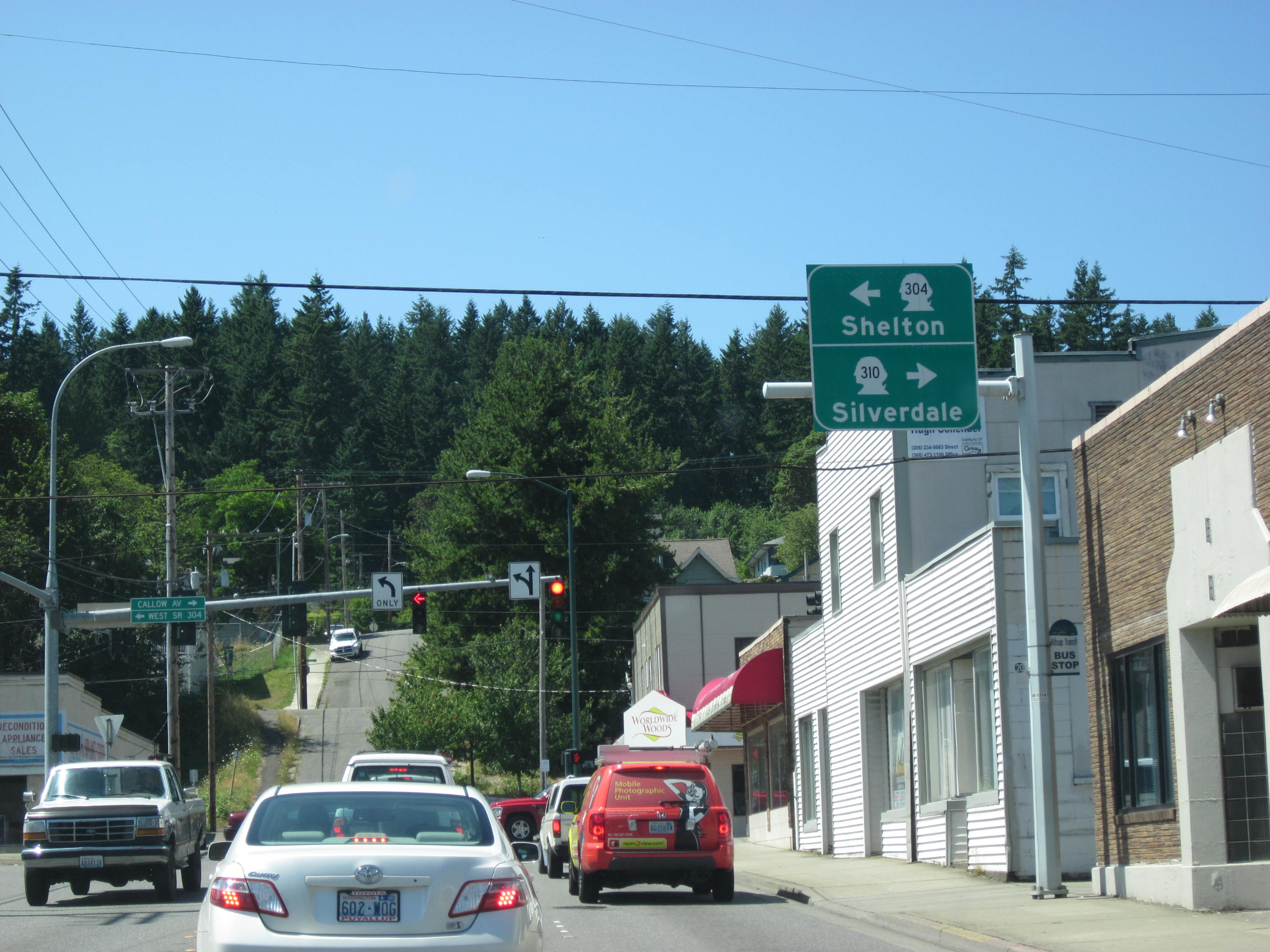
SR 304 westbound approaching Callow Avenue (SR 310) in Downtown Bremerton.

SR 310 begins at a diamond interchange with the SR 3 in Bremerton and travels east as Kitsap Way, passing south of Oyster Bay. The highway briefly travels northeast and passes Forest Ridge Park before turning southward onto 6th Street and Callow Avenue, ending at an intersection with SR 304 as it turns east onto Burwell Street.

Every year, the Washington State Department of Transportation (WSDOT) conducts a series of surveys on its highways in the state to measure traffic volume. This is expressed in terms of annual average daily traffic (AADT), which is a measure of traffic volume for any average day of the year. In 2011, WSDOT calculated that between 8,100 and 38,000 vehicles per day used the highway. SR 310 is designated as part of the National Highway System, a system of roads that are important to the nation's economy, defense and mobility. WSDOT has also designated SR 310 as a Highway of Statewide Significance, which is critical to connecting major communities in the state.

== History ==
SR 310 was established in 1991 as a connector from SR 304 in Bremerton to the SR 3 freeway, following the alignment of SR 3 in Bremerton prior to the construction of its bypass of Bremerton in the 1970s. The highway was first codified into the state highway system in 1915 as part of State Road 21 and became PSH 21 in 1937. SR 3 was created during the 1964 highway renumbering, following the route of PSH 21 from Shelton to Port Gamble, and traveled along Callow Avenue and Kitsap Way within Bremerton. Work began on a freeway bypass of Bremerton in the 1960s, with the first section opening in February 1968 and SR 3 being re-aligned onto it after 1970. After the Ohio-class submarines were commissioned by the United States Navy and Naval Base Kitsap was selected to house them in 1977, a $36.9 million investment in local highways was spent to expand the SR 3 freeway and build a bypass of Silverdale for SR 303. No major revisions to the route of SR 310 have occurred since it was established in 1991, however the City of Bremerton rejected a proposal to repave Kitsap Way in 1997.

== Major intersections ==
The entire highway is in Bremerton, Kitsap County.

mi	km	Destinations	Notes
0.00– 0.05	0.00– 0.080	SR 3 – Silverdale, Poulsbo, Shelton	Interchange
1.84	2.96	SR 304 (Burwell Street) – Shelton, City Center, Seattle Ferry	
1.000 mi = 1.609 km; 1.000 km = 0.621 mi
