= Overlook Walk =

Bridge in Seattle, Washington, U.S.

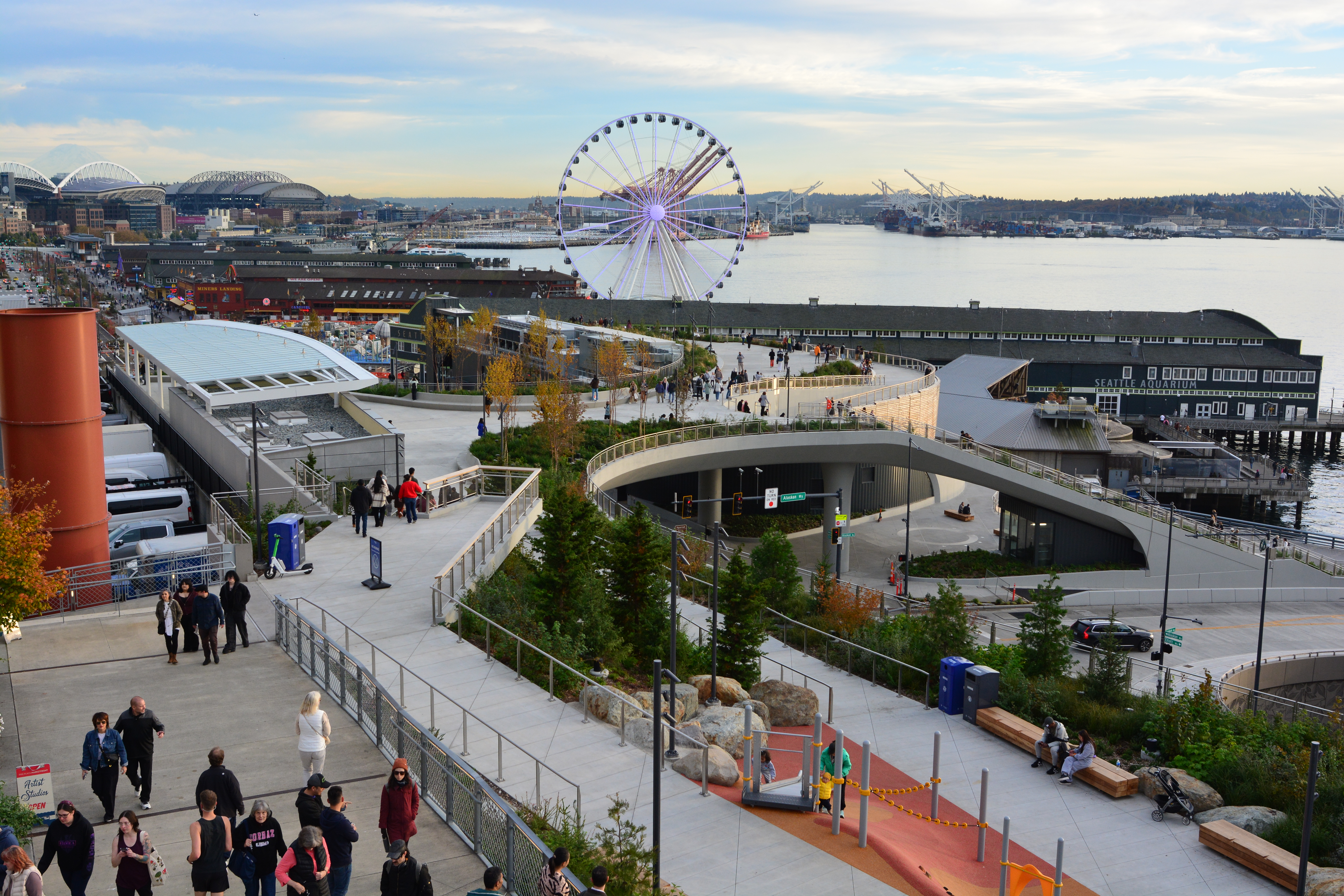
- Coordinates: 47°36′31″N 122°20′34″W
- Crosses: Alaskan Way
- Locale: Seattle, Washington, U.S.

Overlook Walk is a bridge over Alaskan Way in Seattle, in the U.S. state of Washington. Completed in 2024, the bridge serves as a pedestrian path to connect the Central Waterfront district and Pike Place Market. Construction on the project began in June 2022.
