= Washington State Route 3 =

State highway in the U.S. state of Washington

State Route 3
- SR 3 highlighted in red

Route information
- Maintained by WSDOT
- Length: 59.81 mi (96.25 km)
- Existed: 1964–present

Major junctions
- South end: US 101 near Shelton
- SR 302 in Allyn-Grapeview; SR 16 in Gorst; SR 304 in Navy Yard City; SR 303 in Silverdale; SR 305 in Poulsbo
- North end: SR 104 near Port Gamble

Location
- Country: United States
- State: Washington
- Counties: Mason, Kitsap

Highway system
- State highways in Washington; Interstate; US; State; Scenic; Pre-1964; 1964 renumbering; Former
← US 2	→ SR 4

State Route 3 (SR 3) is a 59.81-mile-long (96.25 km) state highway in the U.S. state of Washington, serving the Kitsap Peninsula in Mason and Kitsap counties. The highway begins at U.S. Route 101 (US 101) south of Shelton and travels northeast onto the Kitsap Peninsula through Belfair to Gorst, where it intersects SR 16 and begins its freeway. SR 3 travels west of Bremerton, Silverdale and Poulsbo before it terminates at the eastern end of the Hood Canal Bridge, signed as SR 104. The highway is designated as a Strategic Highway Network (STRAHNET) corridor under the National Highway System as the main thoroughfare connecting both parts of Naval Base Kitsap and is also part of the Highways of Statewide Significance program.

SR 3 was established during the 1964 highway renumbering and codified in 1970 as the successor to Secondary State Highway 14 (SSH 14) from Shelton to Belfair, Primary State Highway 14 (PSH 14) from Belfair to Gorst, and PSH 21 from Gorst to the Hood Canal Bridge. PSH 21 was previously part of State Road 21 from 1915 to 1937, while PSH 14 was part of State Road 14 and the Navy Yard Highway from 1919 to 1937. The present SR 3 freeway was opened in 1968 in the Bremerton area and was extended north to Silverdale in 1973, to Bangor in 1981, and to Poulsbo in 1983.

== Route description ==
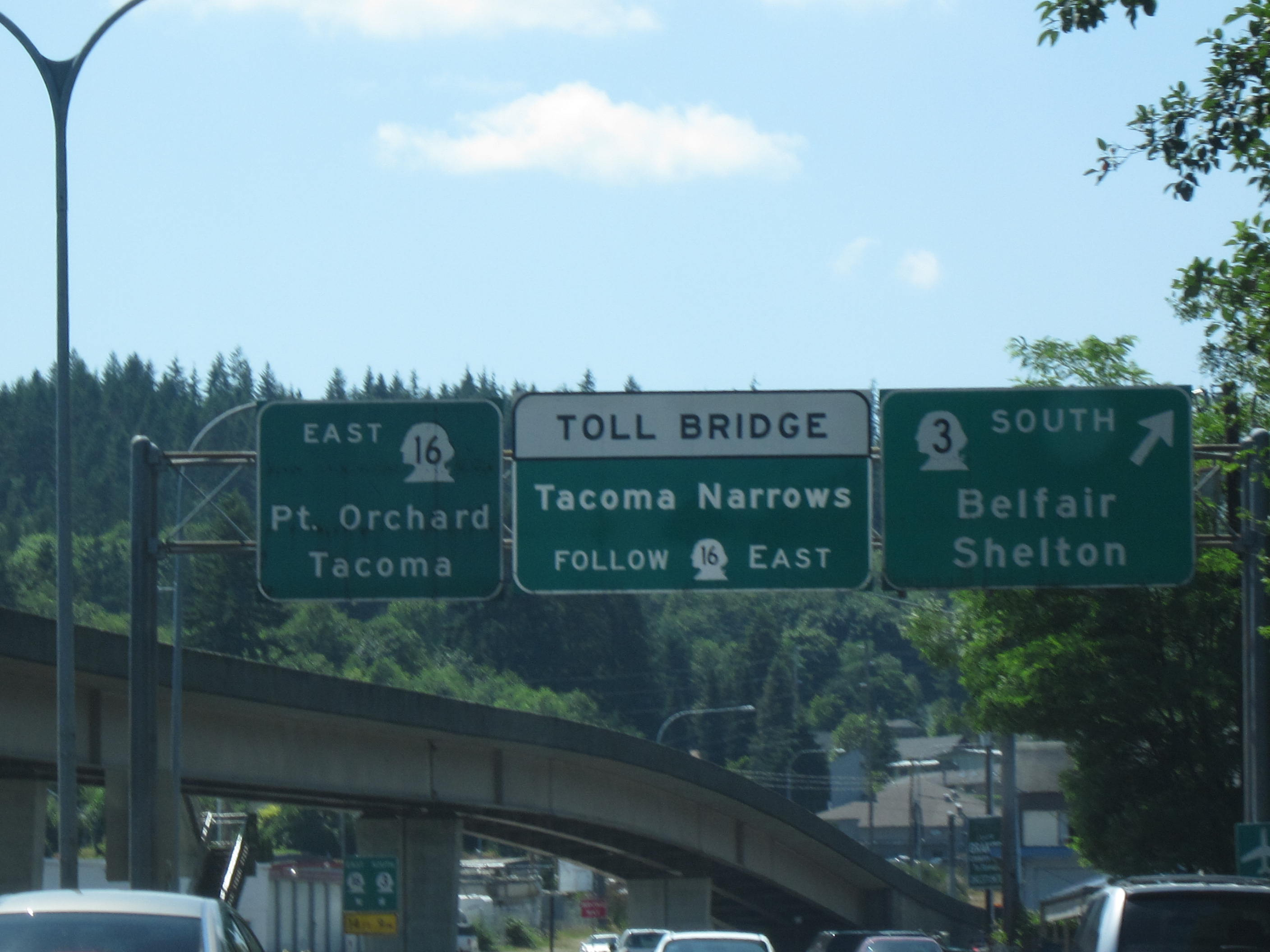
SR 3 southbound approaching the western terminus of SR 16 in Gorst

SR 3 begins at a diamond interchange with US 101 south of Shelton in unincorporated Mason County on the Olympic Peninsula. The highway travels north into Shelton at the end of Oakland Bay on 1st Street and crosses over a Puget Sound and Pacific Railroad line and Goldsborough Creek. SR 3 turns east on Pine Street and leaves Shelton, traveling northeast along Oakland Bay and a US Navy rail line. The highway continues north along Oakland Bay and Case Inlet past heavily forested areas to Allyn-Grapeview, where it serves as the western terminus of SR 302 at North Mason High School. SR 3 travels towards the southern end of the Hood Canal and intersects the eastern termini of SR 106 and SR 300 in Belfair. The highway continues northeast past Bremerton National Airport towards the community of Gorst in Kitsap County, where it forms the western terminus of SR 16.

SR 3 becomes a four-lane divided freeway and travels northeast along the Sinclair Inlet to an interchange with SR 304 in Navy Yard City, serving the city of Bremerton and Naval Station Bremerton. The freeway continues through western Bremerton past the diamond interchange with SR 310 and the community of Chico along Dyes Inlet. SR 3 travels west of Silverdale past the western terminus of SR 303 at the Kitsap Mall and east of Naval Submarine Base Bangor in Bangor. The freeway continues north towards Poulsbo past the termini of SR 308 and SR 305, which serve Keyport and Bainbridge Island respectively. SR 3 travels north from Poulsbo as a two-lane road towards Port Gamble and ends at the eastern approach of the Hood Canal Bridge at an intersection with SR 104.

Every year, the Washington State Department of Transportation (WSDOT) conducts a series of surveys on its highways in the state to measure traffic volume. This is expressed in terms of annual average daily traffic (AADT), which is a measure of traffic volume for any average day of the year. In 2011, WSDOT calculated that the busiest section of SR 3 was between SR 16 in Gorst and SR 304 in Navy Yard City, serving 69,000 vehicles, while the least busiest section was southwest of Allyn-Grapeview at an intersection with Grapeview Loop Road, serving 6,600 vehicles. SR 3 is designated as a STRAHNET corridor within National Highway System, connecting Naval Base Kitsap to the state highway system between Gorst and Bangor, while the rest of the highway is part of the system, which includes roadways important to the national economy, defense, and mobility. WSDOT designates the entire route of SR 3 as a Highway of Statewide Significance, which includes highways that connect major communities in the state of Washington.

== History ==
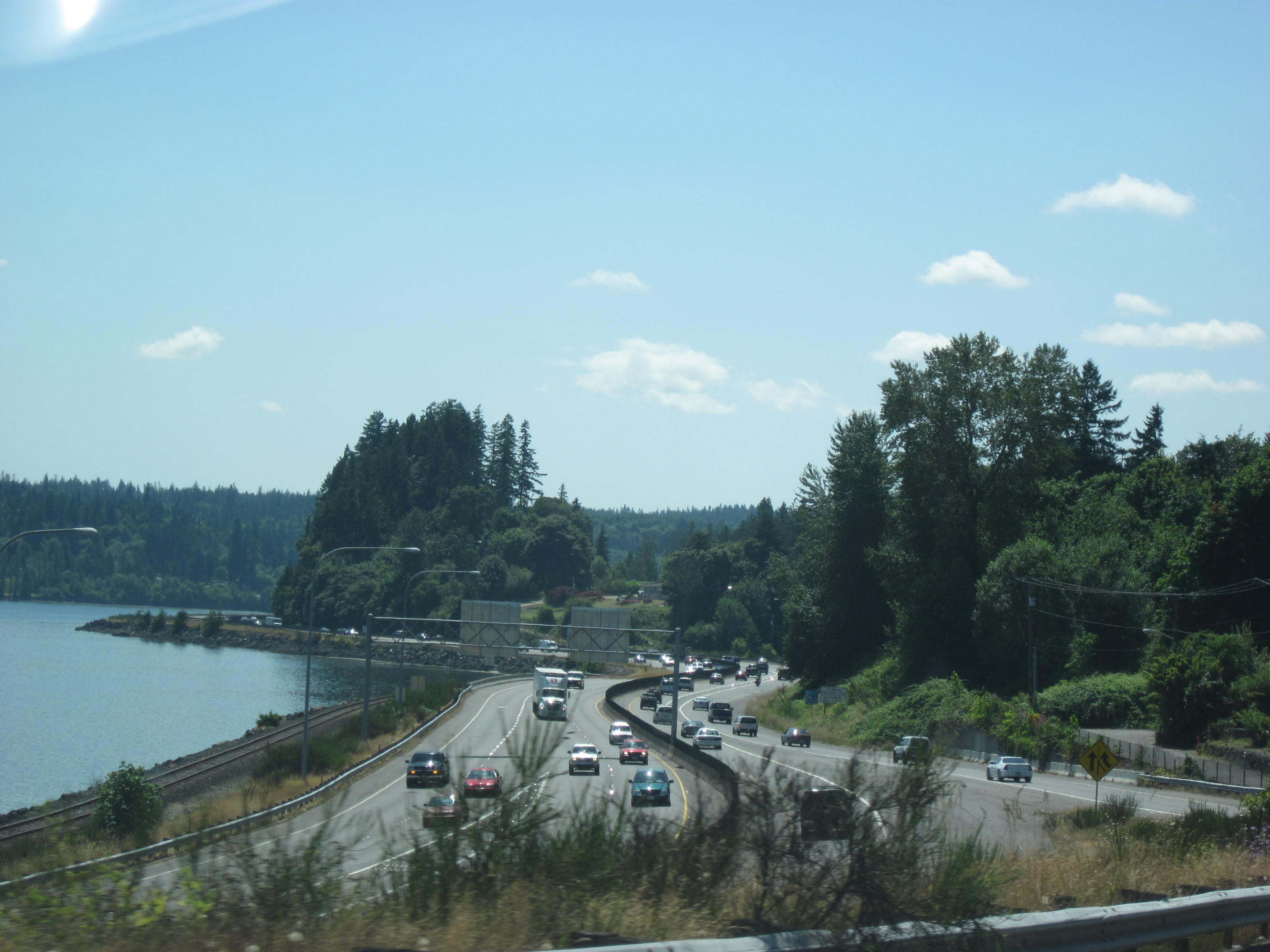
SR 3 southbound viewed from the SR 304 flyover ramp in Navy Yard City, built during the early 1970s.

SR 3 follows the route of a paved section of State Road 21 between Belfair and Port Gamble on the Kitsap Peninsula that was added to the state highway system in 1915. The highway was later split between the Navy Yard Highway from Belfair to Bremerton and State Road 21 from Bremerton to Port Gamble in 1919. In 1923, the state highway system was restructured and the Navy Yard Highway was numbered as State Road 14, while State Road 21 kept its designation. The Navy Yard Highway, an unpaved highway connecting Union to Charleston, was dedicated on June 12, 1923.

During the creation of the primary and secondary state highway system in 1937, the paved State Roads 14 and 21 kept their numerical designations and became PSH 14 and PSH 21, respectively. PSH 21 was extended southwest from Bremerton on the former Navy Yard Highway to Gorst, while PSH 14 turned south at Gorst and headed towards Tacoma. A branch of PSH 14, named SSH 14A, was designated on a gravel road that connected the main highway at Belfair to US 101 in Shelton. In 1955, PSH 21 was extended southwest along PSH 14 from Gorst to Union, shortening PSH 14 to its current route as SR 16.

During the 1964 highway renumbering, a new state route system replaced the existing primary and secondary state highways and SR 3 was designated along SSH 14A, PSH 14, and PSH 21 on its present route when it was codified in 1970. Construction of the freeway section of SR 3 began in 1963 between SR 304 in Navy Yard City and Silverdale west of Bremerton and was opened in February 1968 at a cost of $2.2 million. The freeway was extended north towards Poulsbo in late 1973, and further north to Naval Submarine Base Bangor in 1981 after the arrival of Ohio-class submarines at Bangor. The Poulsbo section was widened and extended through an interchange with SR 305 in the early 1990s. The freeway was originally intended to connect with SR 16 (itself upgraded to a freeway in the 1970s and 1980s) with a bridge across the Sinclair Inlet.

In the 2000s, WSDOT re-built the interchange between SR 3 and SR 303 in Silverdale at a cost of $26 million, paid for by a 2003 gas tax. The new interchange, opened in November 2007, split the western terminus of SR 303 between two exits, signed as 45A and 45B, and removed a loop ramp that created turning conflicts. WSDOT began study of a Belfair bypass in 1966 and completed a provisional report in 2010 that did not recommend constructing a bypass of the community, instead opting for a project to widen the highway and add safety improvements that began work in late 2013. The project was revived later in the decade and is scheduled to be completed by 2026, carrying the new alignment of SR 3 while the existing road remains as a business route through Belfair.

== Major intersections ==
County	Location	mi	km	Exit	Destinations	Notes
Mason		0.00– 0.11	0.00– 0.18		US 101 – Port Angeles, Olympia	Southern terminus, interchange
Mason	Allyn-Grapeview	23.23	37.39		SR 302 east – Tacoma	Western terminus of SR 302
Mason		24.88	40.04		SR 106 west – Union	Eastern terminus of SR 106
Mason	Belfair	26.35	42.41		SR 300 west – Belfair State Park	Eastern terminus of SR 300
Kitsap	Gorst	34.15– 34.23	54.96– 55.09		SR 16 Spur to SR 16 east – Port Orchard, Tacoma	Western terminus of SR 16 Spur
Kitsap	Gorst	34.64	55.75		SR 16 east – Port Orchard, Tacoma, Business District	Western terminus of SR 16
Kitsap	South end of freeway					
Kitsap	Navy Yard City	36.04– 36.23	58.00– 58.31	36	SR 304 east – Bremerton	Western terminus of SR 304, no southbound exit
Kitsap	Bremerton	36.98– 37.81	59.51– 60.85	37	Auto Center Way, Loxie Eagans Boulevard	
Kitsap	Bremerton	37.99– 38.70	61.14– 62.28	38	SR 310 east (Kitsap Way)	Western terminus of SR 310
Kitsap	Bremerton	38.91– 39.70	62.62– 63.89	39	Austin Drive – Kitsap Lake	
Kitsap	Erlands Point-Kitsap Lake	40.68– 41.66	65.47– 67.05		Chico Way – Chico	
Kitsap	Silverdale	42.88– 43.96	69.01– 70.75	43	Newberry Hill Road	
Kitsap	Silverdale	45.10– 45.16	72.58– 72.68	45A	SR 303 (Kitsap Mall Boulevard) – Kitsap Mall, Silverdale	Northbound exit and southbound entrance
Kitsap	Silverdale	45.54– 46.19	73.29– 74.34	45B	SR 303 south (Waaga Way) – East Bremerton	
Kitsap		46.37– 47.28	74.63– 76.09	47	Trigger Avenue	
Kitsap	Bangor	47.82– 48.96	76.96– 78.79		SR 308 east (Luoto Road) – Keyport, Naval Base Kitsap	
Kitsap	Poulsbo	51.77– 51.87	83.32– 83.48		Finn Hill Road	
Kitsap	Poulsbo	52.36– 53.23	84.27– 85.67		SR 305 south – Poulsbo, Bainbridge Island	
Kitsap	North end of freeway					
Kitsap		59.81	96.25		SR 104 (Hood Canal Bridge) – Port Gamble, Kingston, Port Townsend, Port Angeles	Northern terminus
1.000 mi = 1.609 km; 1.000 km = 0.621 mi: Incomplete access
