= Washington State Route 519 =

State highway in King County, Washington, US

State Route 519
- SR 519 highlighted in red

Route information
- Auxiliary route of I-5
- Maintained by WSDOT
- Length: 1.09 mi (1.75 km)
- Existed: 1991–present

Major junctions
- South end: I-90 in Seattle
- SR 99 in Seattle
- North end: Colman Dock in Seattle

Location
- Country: United States
- State: Washington
- County: King

Highway system
- State highways in Washington; Interstate; US; State; Scenic; Pre-1964; 1964 renumbering; Former
← SR 518	→ SR 520

State Route 519 (SR 519) is a state highway in Seattle, Washington, United States. It connects Interstate 90 (I-90) to the Port of Seattle and Colman Dock, which serves as the terminus of two ferry routes. The highway travels along city streets, including two named for Seattle Mariners personalities: Edgar Martinez Drive and Dave Niehaus Way, as well as Alaskan Way. SR 519 was established in 1991 on preexisting streets that were first built in the early 20th century. State projects moved the southern terminus of SR 519 in 2010 to its current location and temporarily rerouted it during demolition of the Alaskan Way Viaduct.

== Route description ==
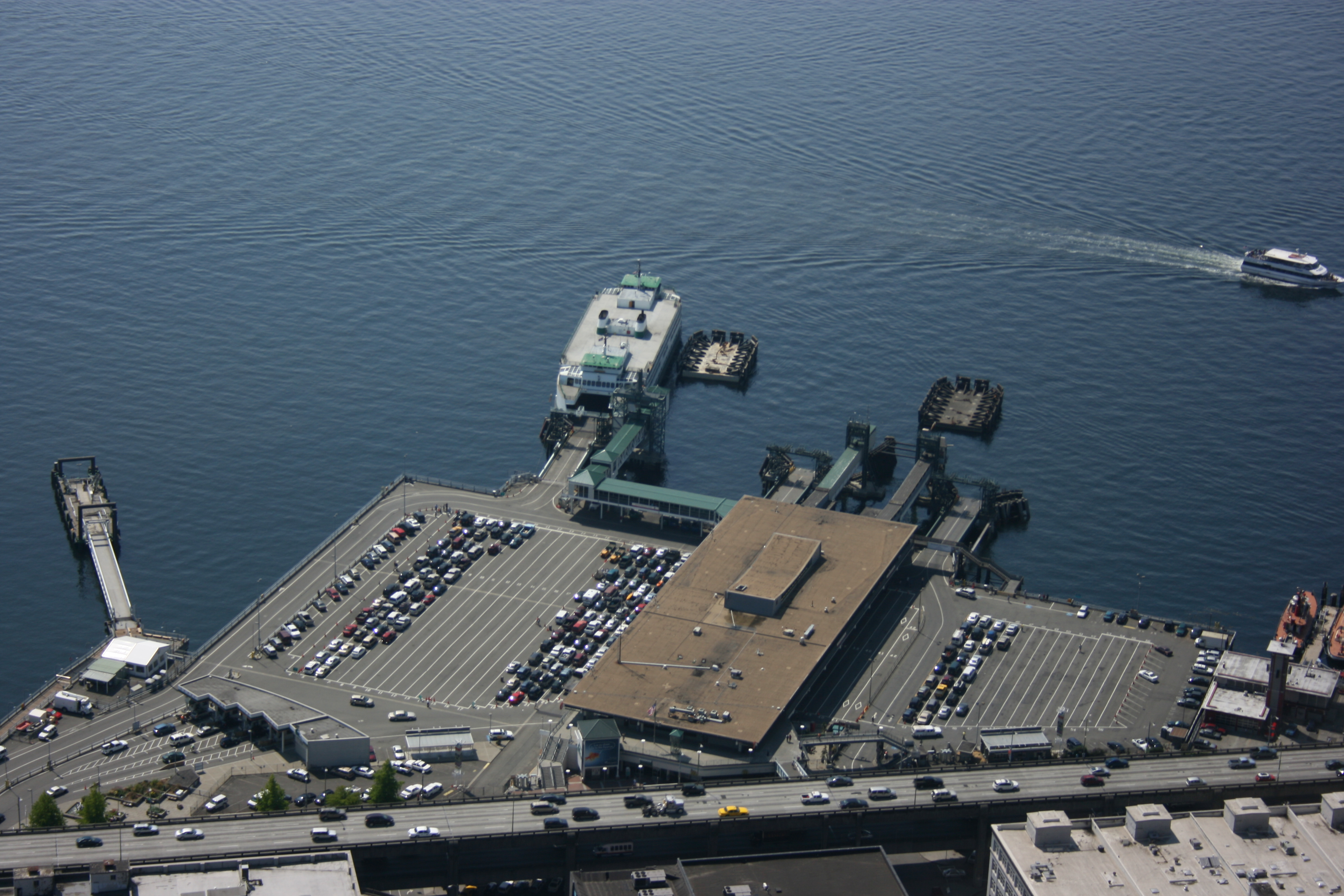
The northern terminus of SR 519 at Colman Dock (Pier 52) on the Central Waterfront of Seattle viewed from the Columbia Center

SR 519 begins as Edgar Martinez Drive, named for former Seattle Mariners player Edgar Martínez, in the SoDo neighborhood south of Downtown Seattle. The highway begins at an elevated intersection with 4th Avenue and the western terminus of I-90. The highway travels west over BNSF Railway tracks, heading north to King Street Station, and turns north onto Dave Niehaus Way, named for former Mariners sportscaster Dave Niehaus, at an intersection with South Atlantic Street. Dave Niehaus Way continues north along the west side of T-Mobile Park and Lumen Field before becoming 1st Avenue. SR 519 turns west onto South Dearborn Street and north onto Alaskan Way at an intersection with ramps serving SR 99 at the south portal of its downtown tunnel. The highway ends at an intersection with Yesler Way at Colman Dock (Pier 52), which is served by two state ferry routes to Bremerton and Bainbridge Island. Alaskan Way continues north along the city's waterfront towards Lower Queen Anne.

The highway primarily serves as a connector to Colman Dock, the Port of Seattle, and the city's waterfront. Every year, the Washington State Department of Transportation (WSDOT) conducts a series of surveys on its highways in the state to measure traffic volume. This is expressed in terms of annual average daily traffic (AADT), which is a measure of traffic volume for any average day of the year. Average traffic volumes on the highway in 2019 ranged from a minimum of 12,000 vehicles on Alaskan Way near Colman Dock to a maximum of 33,000 vehicles on 1st Avenue near T-Mobile Park. The state government has designated SR 519 as a Highway of Statewide Significance, which includes principal arterials that are needed to connect major communities in the state.

== History ==
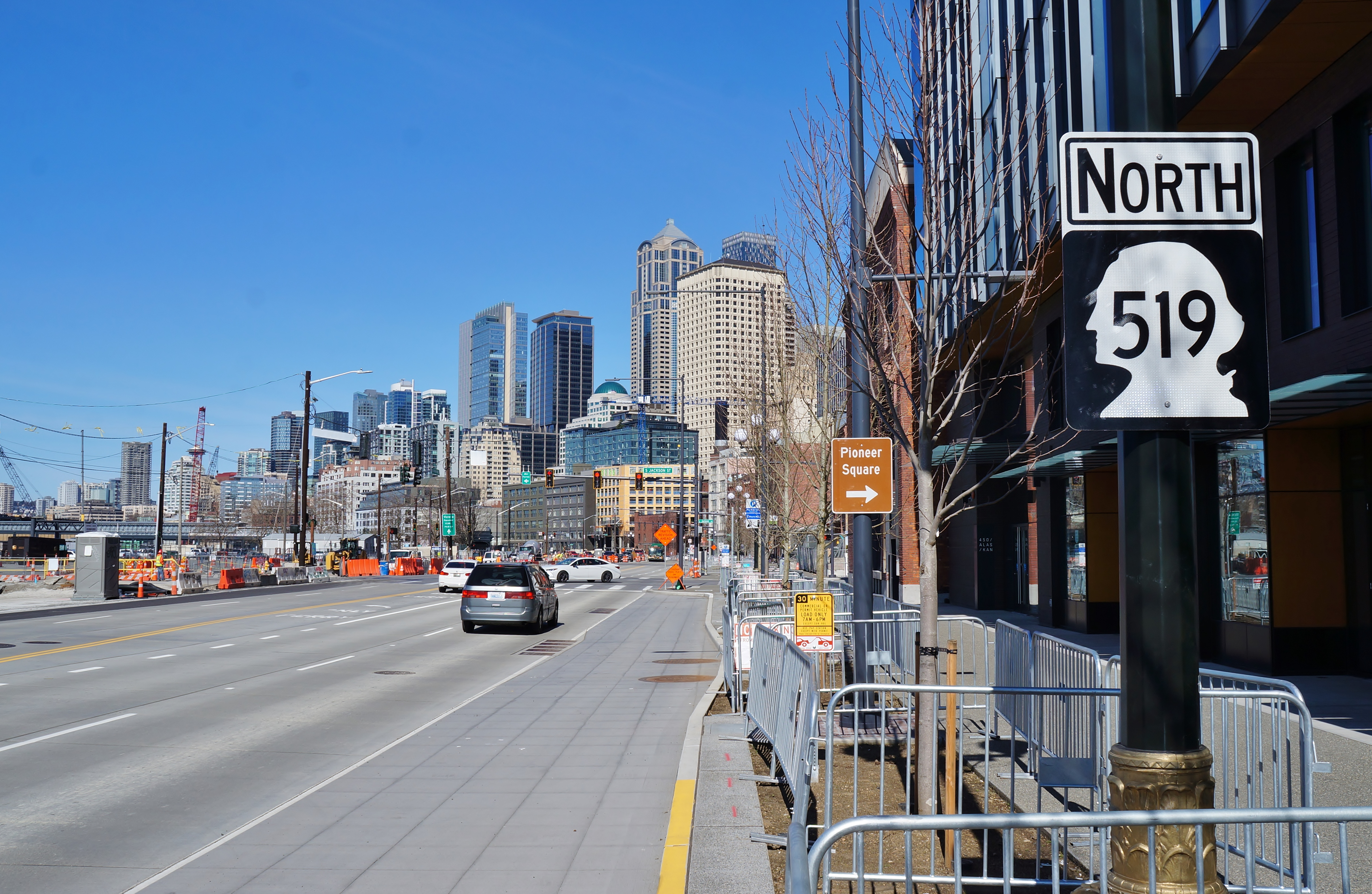
SR 519 northbound on Alaskan Way after the demolition of the viaduct

SR 519 was codified in 1991 as a state highway and began at the western terminus of I-90, then at 4th Avenue S., and traveled west onto Royal Brougham Way and north on Alaskan Way to Colman Dock. The city streets in Seattle used by SR 519 were constructed after the series of regrades in the early 20th century filled a mudflat in SoDo. By 1916, Alaskan Way (then known as Railroad Avenue) was paved and had its rails removed to handle growing traffic. The Alaskan Way Viaduct was built above Alaskan Way between 1950 and 1953 and narrowed the street after Colman Dock was transferred to Washington State Ferries in 1951. Ferry routes were incorporated into the state highway system in 1994, as SR 304 and SR 305 were extended to Seattle and SR 339 was created.

WSDOT completed their South Seattle Intermodal Access Project in May 2010, which improved SR 519 and the western terminus of I-90 to better handle freight traffic heading to the Port of Seattle. New bridges over BNSF Railway tracks were built on Royal Brougham Way and off-ramps to I-90 that connect to Edgar Martinez Drive. SR 519 was later moved onto Edgar Martinez Drive in 2010 as a direct extension of I-90 after the construction of the new ramp and improvements to an intersection with Atlantic Street. Until then, SR 519 had used a section of South Royal Brougham Way and 4th Avenue South to reach the I-90 ramps. SR 519 is routed onto two streets named for Seattle Mariners personalities: Edgar Martinez Drive, dedicated in 2005, and Dave Niehaus Way, dedicated in 2010. During the construction of the Alaskan Way Viaduct replacement tunnel, WSDOT closed SR 519 and Alaskan Way between King Street and Yesler Way in May 2012, re-routing the highway to a temporary alignment. Alaskan Way is planned to be widened to eight lanes to accommodate bus lanes and turn lanes for the ferry terminal.

== Major intersections ==
The entire highway is in Seattle, King County.

mi	km	Destinations	Notes
0.00	0.00	I-90 east to I-5 / 4th Avenue – Spokane	
0.38	0.61	To SR 99 north / South Royal Brougham Way	
0.73	1.17	SR 99 south / Alaskan Way / South Dearborn Street	
1.09	1.75	Colman Dock at Yesler Way – Bremerton Ferry (SR 304), Bainbridge Ferry (SR 305)	Alaskan Way continues north
1.000 mi = 1.609 km; 1.000 km = 0.621 mi
