= Plain 100 =

Ultramarathon held in the US state of Washington

- Date: September
- Location: Washington state
- Event type: Ultramarathon trail run
- Distance: 100 miles (160 km), 100 kilometres (62 mi)
- Established: 1997
- Website: https://www.plain100.com/

Plain 100 is an ultramarathon held annually near Plain, Washington. Founded in 1997, it features roughly 100 miles (160 km) and 21,000 feet (6,400 m) of elevation gain. There is also a 100 kilometres (62 mi) distance. Plain 100 is considered one of the most difficult endurance races in the world, primarily due to the fact that runners are completely self-supported while on course and there are no course markings.

== Race course and description ==
Plain 100 is composed of two loops of trails within the Wenatchee National Forest, with a resupply allowed at the halfway point while passing through the start/finish location. While on the loops, participants are completely self-supported, meaning that there are no course markings, aid stations, or other forms of support such as pacers. Even experienced, previous finishers have gotten lost on course due to confusion and fatigue. Fellow runners may aid one another, though carrying food, water, or gear for others (muling) is not allowed. There are safety checkpoints staffed by SAR teams.

== History ==
Plain 100 was founded by Tom Ripley and Chris Ralph in 1997 in the vein of other endurance events like the Yukon Arctic Ultra and Marathon Des Sables. The first year none of the six runners finished, and in many other early years there were no finishers. In several other years the race has been cancelled due to local wildfires. By 2015, Tim Stroh and Tim Dehnhoff became race directors, with Stroh having been one of the first finishers in 1998.
