= Alaskan Way =

Street in Seattle, Washington

- Dzidzilalich
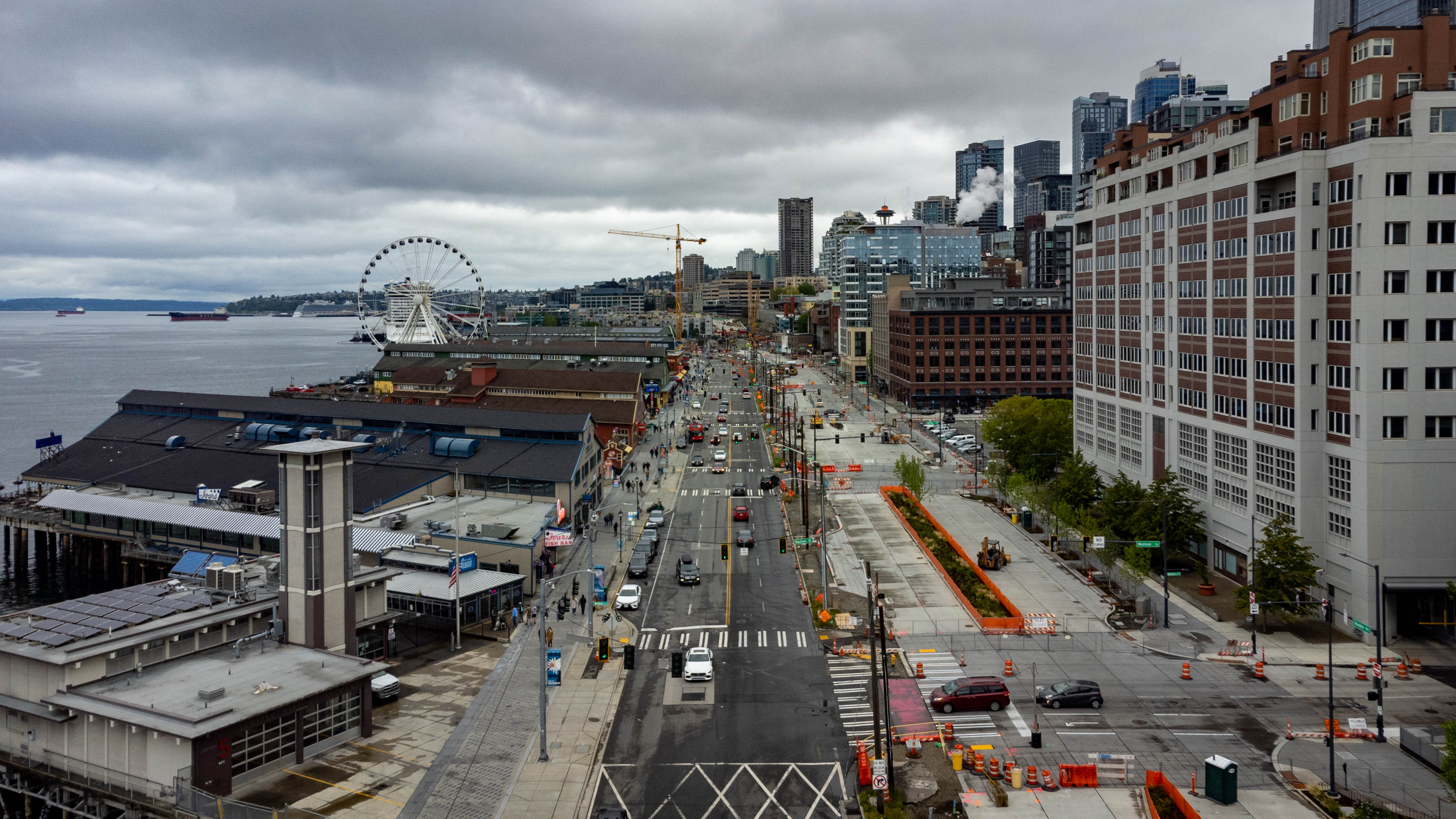
- Aerial view of Alaskan Way under reconstruction in 2022, looking north from Madison Street
- Former name: Railroad Avenue
- Namesake: Alaska
- Maintained by: Seattle Department of Transportation
- Length: 1.5 mi (2.4 km)
- Location: Seattle, Washington, U.S.
- South end: South King Street
- Major junctions: SR 519; SR 304 / SR 305 (Colman Dock); Madison Street
- North end: Broad Street

Alaskan Way, originally Railroad Avenue, is a major north-south street in Seattle, Washington, that runs along the Elliott Bay waterfront from just north of S. Holgate Street in the Industrial District—south of which it becomes East Marginal Way S.— to Broad Street in Belltown, north of which is Myrtle Edwards Park and the Olympic Sculpture Park. The right-of-way continues northwest through the park, just west of the BNSF Railway mainline, and the roadway picks up again for a few blocks at Smith Cove. It follows a route known in the late 19th century as the "Ram's Horn" because of its shape. The street gave its name to the Alaskan Way Viaduct, which until 2019 carried Washington State Route 99 through downtown Seattle. The northern section of Alaskan Way is also signed as its honorary name, Dzidzilalich.

== History ==
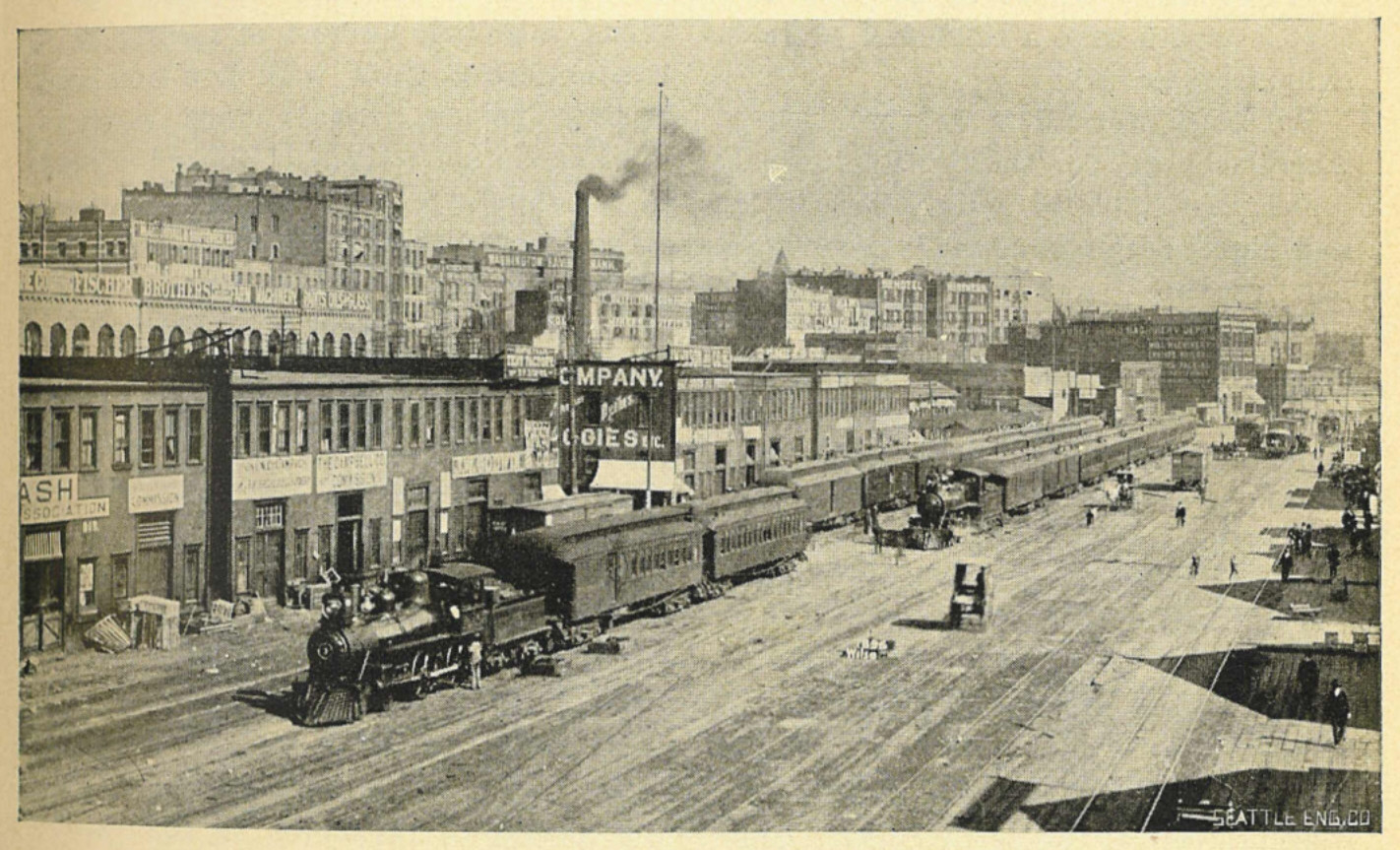
Railroad Avenue, looking southeast from near Marion Street, 1900.

The idea of building a rail corridor along Seattle's Central Waterfront goes back at least to Thomas Burke and Daniel Hunt Gilman and the construction of the Seattle, Lake Shore and Eastern Railway in the years before the Great Seattle Fire of 1889. Railroad Avenue was built as a planked roadway on pilings over the waters of Elliott Bay. South of Downtown, the rail line constituted the one major man-made feature in an area of tideflats.

The portion of Railroad Avenue from Yesler Way in what is now the Pioneer Square neighborhood to University Street near today's Harbor Steps burned in the Great Fire, as did most of the city and most of its piers. All were soon rebuilt on a grander scale. In the case of Railroad Avenue, this was largely the work of the Northern Pacific Railroad and Great Northern Railway. The tideflats were steadily filled in, placing the rails south of Downtown—and the route of the southern portion of today's Alaskan Way—on dry land.

Around 1900, Railroad Avenue was a chaos of horses and buggies, pedestrians, and rail cars, with multiple railroad tracks and sidings. The congestion of the rail corridor was somewhat relieved when the Great Northern built a rail tunnel (1903–1906) under Downtown. From that time, only traffic that actually needed to access the waterfront had to use Railroad Avenue; other trains could bypass the busy corridor. Still, there continued to be problems with the structural integrity of the planked roadway. Pilings had been driven into soft tideland substrates, waves caused continual damage, and railroad freight cars continually stressed the structure. Between 1911 and 1916, a concrete seawall strengthened the portion of the waterfront between S. Washington Street and Madison Street.

Alaskan Way facing south from Bell Street with the former Alaskan Way Viaduct, August 2011

Federal funds supplemented a local levy to allow the city to extend the seawall northward to Bay Street, which was completed in 1936. On July 6, 1936, the city council renamed Railroad Avenue to Alaskan Way, with "Pacific Way" and "Cosmos Quay" also under consideration. A citizen's committee convened by mayor John F. Dore had chosen "The Pierway" out of 9,000 public suggestions, but it was also not considered by the council. Railroad Avenue was replaced by Alaskan Way, along the same route but built on landfill rather than on pilings. The moniker was adopted in 1936 by the city council after a lengthy debate over the name of the city's new waterfront promenade, with the winning suggesting coming from the Alaska-Yukon Pioneers Association to honor the Klondike gold rush. Other front-runners included Pacific Way, Seawall Avenue, Maritime Drive, and Cosmos Quay. In the early 1950s, the Alaskan Way Viaduct was built, paralleling Alaskan Way for much of its distance.

Alaskan Way during reconstruction works.

=== Redevelopment ===
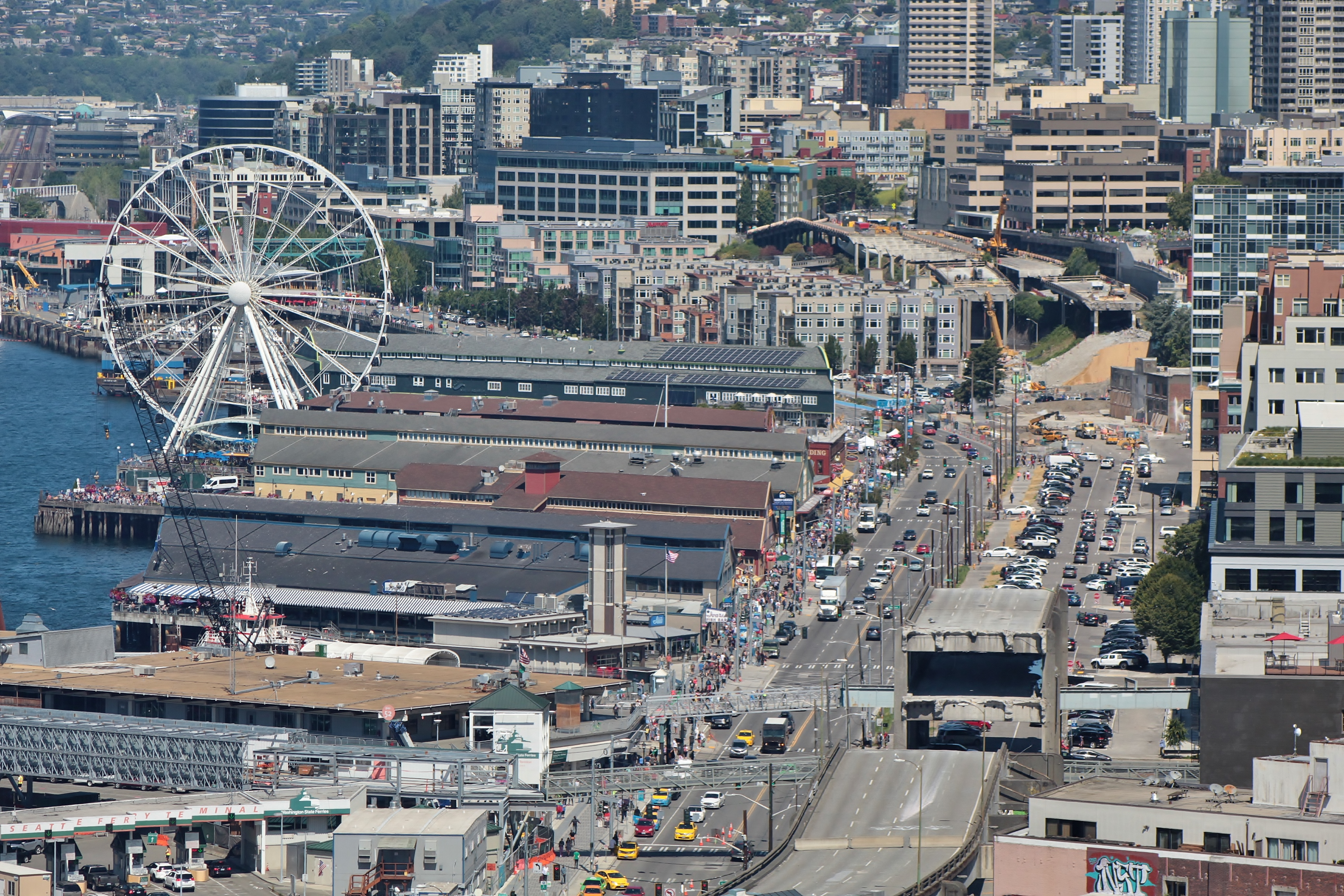
Alaskan Way with the semi-demolished sections of the Alaskan Way Viaduct, seen from Stadium Place in July 2019

In early 2019, a replacement tunnel for the Alaskan Way Viaduct was completed, leading to the closure and demolition of the old viaduct. Starting in February 2019 (when the tunnel opened) and to be completed over six months, the old viaduct was demolished to make way for new development along Seattle's downtown waterfront, including the reconstruction of Alaskan Way itself, which was completed in 2025.

In October 2018, Alaskan Way was temporarily shifted west to facilitate the demolition of the viaduct. The rebuilt Alaskan Way surface street will consist of up to 8 lanes of traffic along its lower section, including two lanes in each direction for general traffic, one lane in each direction for transit, and two turn lanes for ferry access. This new configuration has faced criticism from local businesses and residents; however, the configuration was deemed necessary by city and state transportation officials.

In April 2023, the central section of Alaskan Way was given an honorary name, Dzidzilalich, which was derived from the Lushootseed name dᶻidᶻəlalič (meaning "little crossing-over place"), one of the Duwamish villages on Elliott Bay. The designation was approved by the city council in February 2023 and applies to the section between Dearborn Street and Pike Street. It also includes Elliott Way, a four-lane street connecting Alaskan Way near Pike Place Market to Belltown that opened in May.

The bicycle lanes on the new promenade are planned to end near Pier 62, with a gap to the Elliott Bay Trail at Pier 70 (Broad Street). A new bicycle lane on the west side was proposed to begin construction in 2023, but its design was opposed by the Port of Seattle due to potential conflicts with cruise ship passengers using the Bell Harbor Pier. A revised design from SDOT to move a portion of the lane near Pier 62 to the east side of Alaskan Way drew criticism from local bicycling activists. An updated plan for the bicycle lane, announced in July 2023, would close the lane on days with cruise ship arrivals and departures but leave it otherwise open. During days with closures, cyclists would be redirected to a shared-use path on the east side of Alaskan Way for several blocks.

The new pedestrian and cycle track on the east side of Alaskan Way is planned to be constructed in the former Waterfront Streetcar tracks and funded by a $45 million grant pledged by Melinda French Gates, MacKenzie Scott, the Diller-von Furstenberg Family Foundation, and the Expedia Group. Construction began in December 2024 and is expected to be completed in mid-2025; the 0.6-mile (0.97 km) protected bicycle lane will require a road diet that reduces the on-street lanes to one per direction.
