= Plain, Washington =

- Unincorporated community
- Location within the state of Washington
- Coordinates: 47°45′47″N 120°39′25″W
- Country: United States
- State: Washington
- County: Chelan
- Elevation: 1,870 ft (570 m)
- Time zone: UTC-8 (Pacific (PST))
  - Summer (DST): UTC-7 (PDT)
- ZIP codes: 98826

Plain is a small unincorporated community in Chelan County, Washington, United States. It is located east of Coles Corner, Washington, near U.S. Route 2 and SR 207. Plain was serviced by the former SR 209, now called the Chumstick Highway, which connects Plain with Chumstick and Leavenworth along an old railroad grade.

A post office called Plain was established in 1913, and remained in operation until 1936.

== Attractions and events ==
The town is the location of Plain Valley Ski Trails, a 25-km network of cross-country skiing and snowshoeing trails. A racing team, Plain Valley Nordic Team, is also based in the area.

Plain serves the start and finish for the Plain Endurance Runs, a pair of 100-mile/100-km ultramarathon races that began in 1997. The races are particularly challenging due to the fact that neither pacers, course markings nor aid stations are allowed per the race rules. This resulted in only four total finishers of the 100-mile race during the first eight years of its existence.

== Climate ==
Climate data for Plain, Washington, 1991–2020 normals, 1937–2020 extremes: 1936ft (590m)
Month	Jan	Feb	Mar	Apr	May	Jun	Jul	Aug	Sep	Oct	Nov	Dec	Year
Record high °F (°C)	59 (15)	64 (18)	80 (27)	88 (31)	98 (37)	101 (38)	104 (40)	101 (38)	98 (37)	87 (31)	67 (19)	59 (15)	104 (40)
Mean maximum °F (°C)	47.1 (8.4)	50.7 (10.4)	62.5 (16.9)	73.4 (23.0)	84.0 (28.9)	88.9 (31.6)	94.9 (34.9)	95.2 (35.1)	88.4 (31.3)	74.4 (23.6)	54.8 (12.7)	44.6 (7.0)	96.7 (35.9)
Mean daily maximum °F (°C)	33.7 (0.9)	40.2 (4.6)	48.0 (8.9)	57.3 (14.1)	66.8 (19.3)	72.9 (22.7)	81.9 (27.7)	81.9 (27.7)	74.0 (23.3)	58.0 (14.4)	41.7 (5.4)	32.4 (0.2)	57.4 (14.1)
Daily mean °F (°C)	27.5 (−2.5)	31.4 (−0.3)	37.4 (3.0)	44.5 (6.9)	52.9 (11.6)	59.0 (15.0)	66.1 (18.9)	65.6 (18.7)	57.8 (14.3)	45.7 (7.6)	34.5 (1.4)	26.9 (−2.8)	45.8 (7.7)
Mean daily minimum °F (°C)	21.3 (−5.9)	22.7 (−5.2)	26.9 (−2.8)	31.7 (−0.2)	39.1 (3.9)	45.0 (7.2)	50.2 (10.1)	49.3 (9.6)	41.6 (5.3)	33.4 (0.8)	27.2 (−2.7)	21.4 (−5.9)	34.2 (1.2)
Mean minimum °F (°C)	3.1 (−16.1)	7.5 (−13.6)	15.5 (−9.2)	23.1 (−4.9)	27.6 (−2.4)	34.2 (1.2)	40.4 (4.7)	38.5 (3.6)	30.0 (−1.1)	21.4 (−5.9)	13.9 (−10.1)	6.9 (−13.9)	−3.0 (−19.4)
Record low °F (°C)	−30 (−34)	−31 (−35)	−14 (−26)	17 (−8)	18 (−8)	26 (−3)	29 (−2)	29 (−2)	21 (−6)	8 (−13)	−7 (−22)	−28 (−33)	−31 (−35)
Average precipitation inches (mm)	4.57 (116)	2.95 (75)	2.43 (62)	1.25 (32)	1.31 (33)	0.88 (22)	0.48 (12)	0.42 (11)	0.79 (20)	2.61 (66)	4.58 (116)	4.97 (126)	27.24 (691)
Average snowfall inches (cm)	31.50 (80.0)	17.40 (44.2)	9.50 (24.1)	1.10 (2.8)	0.10 (0.25)	0.00 (0.00)	0.00 (0.00)	0.00 (0.00)	0.00 (0.00)	1.00 (2.5)	14.60 (37.1)	42.10 (106.9)	117.3 (297.85)
Average extreme snow depth inches (cm)	31 (79)	25 (64)	19 (48)	3 (7.6)	0 (0)	0 (0)	0 (0)	0 (0)	0 (0)	1 (2.5)	7 (18)	22 (56)	35 (89)
Average precipitation days (≥ 0.01 in)	16.0	12.4	12.8	8.8	7.7	5.7	2.9	2.8	5.3	10.9	16.0	16.7	118
Average snowy days (≥ 0.1 in)	11.1	7.0	5.1	0.7	0.1	0.0	0.0	0.0	0.0	0.6	5.3	13.0	42.9
Source 1: NOAA
Source 2: XMACIS2 (records, monthly max/mins & 1991-2020 snow depth)
