= Washington State Route 303 =

Highway in Kitsap County, Washington

State Route 303

- SR 303 is highlighted in red

Route information
- Auxiliary route of SR 3
- Maintained by WSDOT
- Length: 9.27 mi (14.92 km)
- Existed: 1964–present

Major junctions
- South end: SR 304 in Bremerton
- North end: SR 3 in Silverdale

Location
- Country: United States
- State: Washington
- Counties: Kitsap

Highway system
- State highways in Washington; Interstate; US; State; Scenic; Pre-1964; 1964 renumbering; Former
← SR 302	→ SR 304

State Route 303 (SR 303) is a 9.27-mile (14.92 km) state highway in Kitsap County, located in the U.S. state of Washington. The highway connects SR 304 in Bremerton to an interchange with SR 3 in Silverdale. SR 303 crosses the Port Washington Narrows on the Warren Avenue Bridge in Bremerton and becomes a grade-separated freeway bypass of Silverdale. The route has existed as unpaved roads since the 1930s and was signed as Secondary State Highway 21B (SSH 21B) in 1937. SSH 21B connected Bremerton to Keyport and had a branch to Illahee State Park added in 1961. After the 1964 highway renumbering, SSH 21B became SR 303 from Bremerton to Keyport and SR 306 from Bremerton to Illahee State Park. SR 303 was shortened in 1971, to include SR 308, and in 1991, re-routing the highway onto the new Silverdale freeway. SR 303 also had a spur route in Bremerton that served the Manette Bridge until 1991.

== Route description ==
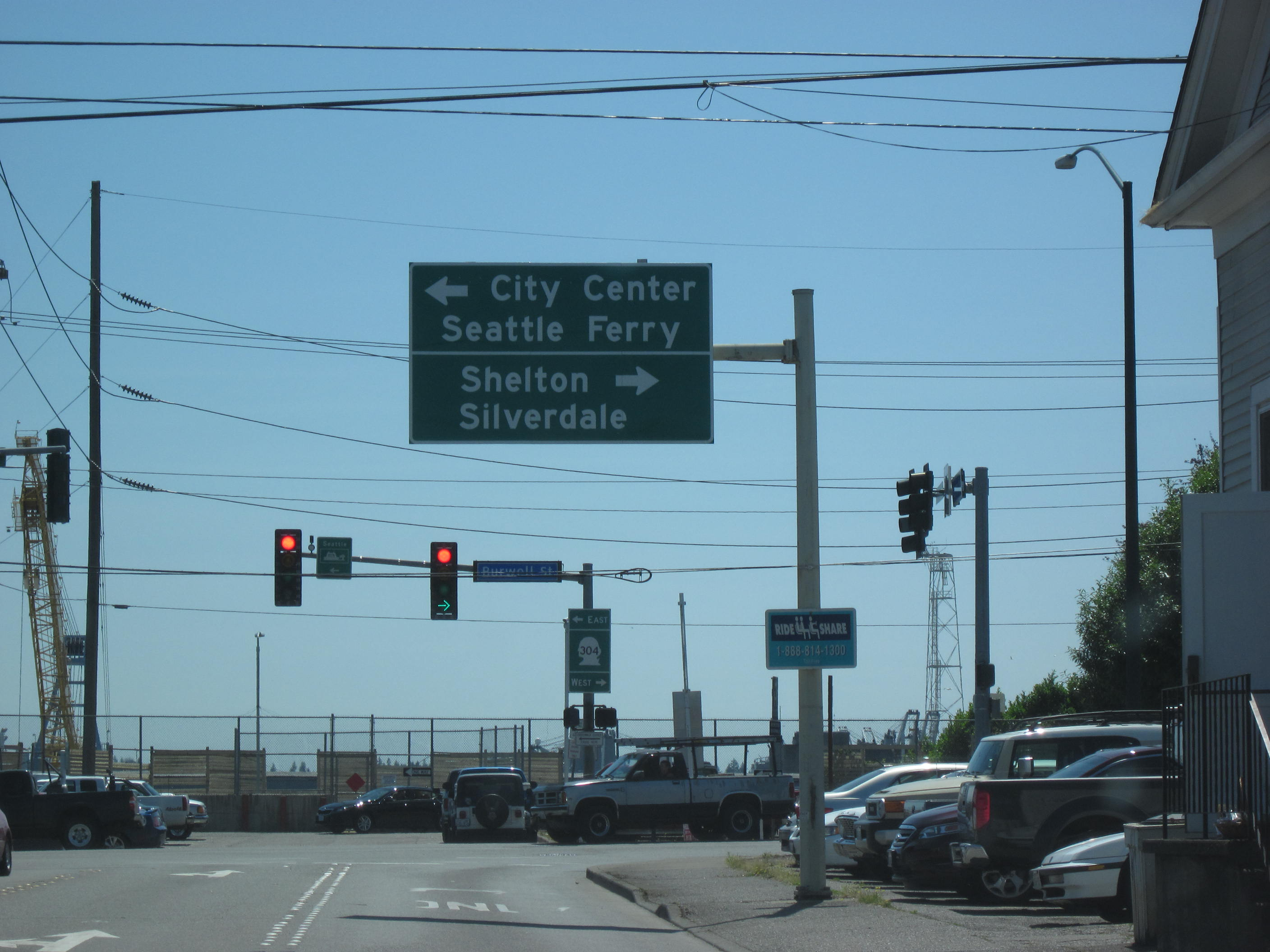
SR 303 as it approaches its southern terminus with SR 304 in Bremerton.

State Route 303 (SR 303), named Warren Avenue, begins at an intersection with Burwell Street, signed as SR 304, north of the Puget Sound Naval Shipyard in Bremerton. Warren Avenue travels north through Bremerton and serves Olympic College before crossing the Port Washington Narrows on the Warren Avenue Bridge. The highway intersects Clare Avenue and Callahan Drive in a partial cloverleaf and diamond interchange. In East Bremerton, the roadway becomes Wheaton Way and continues north through suburban areas and intersects Sheridan Road, a spur route of SR 303 prior to 1991. SR 303 passes View Ridge Elementary and Sylvan Way, the former SR 306 serving Illahee State Park, before leaving Bremerton. The highway turns west at an intersection with its former route, the Brownsville Highway, and becomes a grade-separated freeway named Waaga Way. The freeway intersects Central Valley Road in a partial cloverleaf interchange and turns northwest to intersect Ridgetop Boulevard in a diamond interchange. Waaga Way travels around the Kitsap Mall and interchanges with Silverdale Way before intersecting SR 3 in Silverdale, continuing as Kitsap Mall Boulevard into the city center. The entire highway is part of the National Highway System and was used by a daily average of 42,000 vehicles in 2011.

== History ==
The original route of SR 303, connecting Bremerton to Brownsville and Keyport first appeared on maps in 1933 as a gravel road. In 1937, the roadway was added to the state highway system as Secondary State Highway 21B (SSH 21B), traveling from Primary State Highway 21 (PSH 21) in Bremerton to PSH 21 at Naval Base Kitsap Bangor. A toll bridge across the Port Washington Narrows carrying Warren Avenue and SSH 21B was completed by the state government in November 1958.

A branch of SSH 21B that served Illahee State Park was added in 1961, and became State Route 306 (SR 306) during the 1964 highway renumbering. SSH 21B became SR 303 in the same renumbering, however the segment from Keyport to Bangor (including a short spur) became SR 308 in 1971. A spur route of SR 303, serving the Manette Bridge, was also added to the highway system, but was removed in 1991. SR 303 was re-routed in 1991 onto the new Waaga Way grade-separated freeway bypass of Silverdale that was built in the late 1970s. No major revisions to SR 303 have been made since 1991, however the Manette Bridge is still maintained by the Washington State Department of Transportation and was rebuilt in November 2011. The Wheaton Way section of SR 303 in Bremerton was remodeled in 2012, resulting in traffic on the Warren Avenue Bridge.

== Major intersections ==
The entire highway is in Kitsap County.

Location	mi	km	Destinations	Notes
Bremerton	0.00	0.00	SR 304 (Burwell Street)	Southern terminus
Bremerton	0.89– 1.22	1.43– 1.96	Warren Avenue Bridge over Port Washington Narrows	
Bremerton	1.22	1.96	Clare Avenue	Interchange, Northbound exit
Bremerton	1.38– 1.49	2.22– 2.40	Callahan Drive	Interchange
Bremerton	1.62	2.61	Sheridan Road	Former SR 303 Spur
Bremerton	2.13	3.43	Sylvan Way – Illahee State Park	Former SR 306
	5.59	9.00	Brownsville Highway – Brownsville, Keyport	Former SR 303 north
			South end of freeway	
	6.62– 6.97	10.65– 11.22	Central Valley Road	
Silverdale	7.24– 7.26	11.65– 11.68	Nels Nelson Road	Northbound exit and entrance
Silverdale	8.03– 8.15	12.92– 13.12	Ridgetop Boulevard	
Silverdale	8.41– 8.44	13.53– 13.58	Silverdale Way	Northbound exit and southbound entrance
Silverdale	8.65– 8.88	13.92– 14.29	SR 3 north – Naval Base Kitsap Bangor, Poulsbo	Interchange
Silverdale	9.11– 9.27	14.66– 14.92	SR 3 south – Bremerton, Shelton	Northern terminus, Interchange; continues as Kitsap Mall Boulevard
1.000 mi = 1.609 km; 1.000 km = 0.621 mi: Incomplete access
