= Stadium Place =

Development project in Seattle, Washington, US

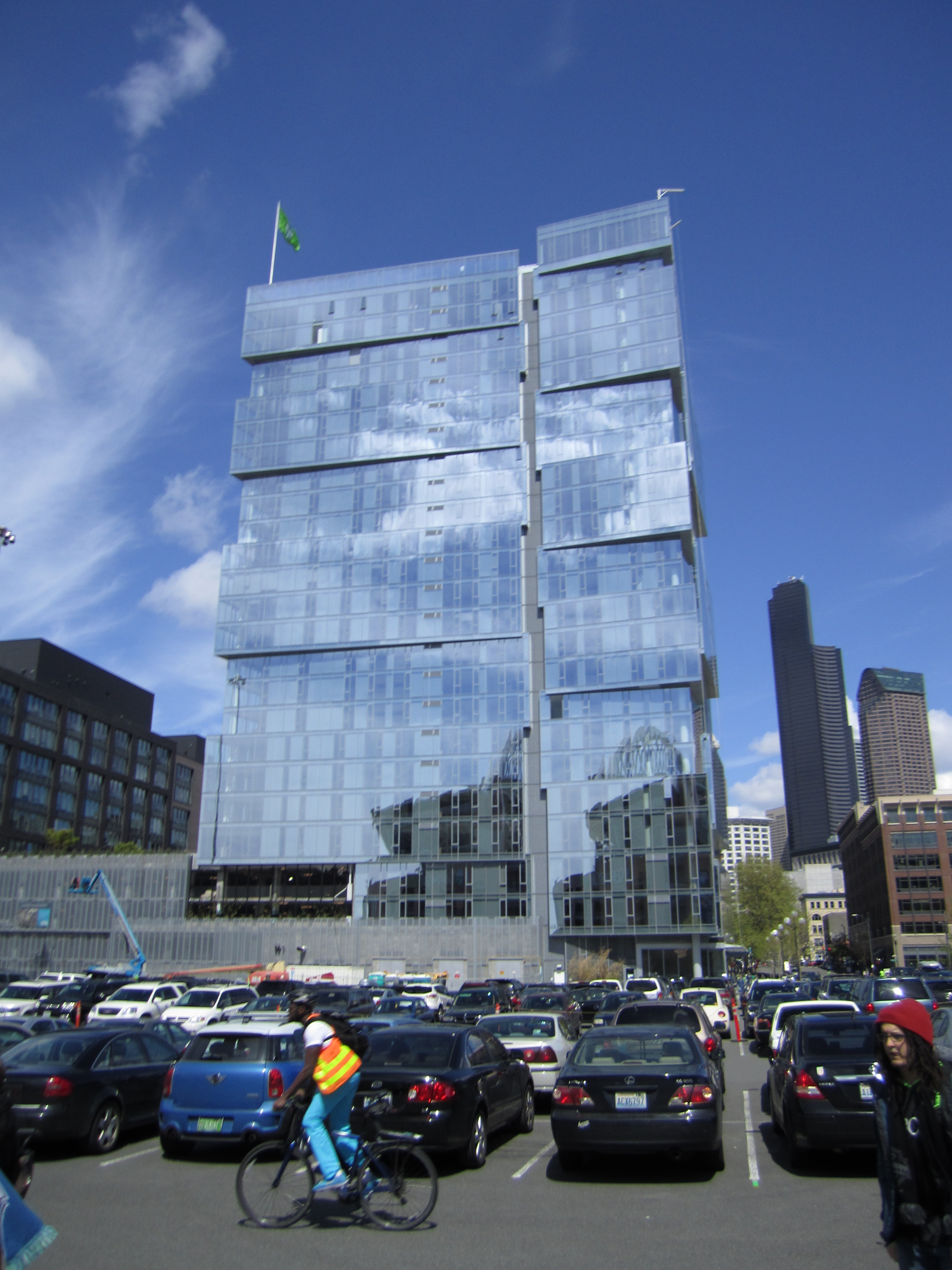
- The Wave (South Tower), April 2014

- Location within Downtown Seattle
- Alternative names: North Lot Development

General information
- Coordinates: 47.5979°N 122.3324°W
- Groundbreaking: September 27, 2011
- Estimated completion: 2017
- Cost: $517 million

Design and construction
- Architecture firm: Zimmer Gunsul Frasca Architects
- Developer: Daniels Real Estate

Website
- northlotdevelopment.com

Stadium Place, also known as the North Lot Development, is a mixed-use development project in the Pioneer Square neighborhood of Seattle, Washington, replacing a parking lot north of Lumen Field.

The first phase of the project, located on the west side of 2nd Avenue South, was completed in 2014 and consists of The Wave, a 26-story residential high-rise building, and The Nolo, a 10-story apartment building. The second phase, on the east side, will be completed in 2017 and consist of an office building named Hawk Tower and an Embassy Suites hotel.

== Buildings ==
Stadium Place consists of four buildings on two blocks along South King Street:

- The Wave: a 26-story, 260-foot-tall (79 m) residential high-rise with condominiums (opened in 2014)
- The Nolo, a 10-story apartment building (opened in 2013)
- Hawk Tower: a 21-story office building partially leased by Avalara, to open in 2017

== Financing ==
Daniels Real Estate and R.D. Merrill have partnered to develop the almost $200 million project. As of February 2009, $20 million in a $51.5 million securities offering had been raised for the initial phase. The construction lender is Pacific Life Insurance Company.

The project also used $300 million in EB-5 visa financing from foreign nationals.

== Construction ==
Construction on the first phase began with a groundbreaking ceremony held on September 27, 2011.

The first phase, built by JTM Contractors, is the western block's podium topped by two residential towers. The four-story base includes apartments, retail space, and a parking garage. The two towers on the western block are The Wave, a 26-story high-rise with 333 units, and The Nolo, a 10-story apartment building with more than 100 units. The Wave's structure consists of multistory glass-clad boxes indirectly stacked atop one another and was designed by Zimmer Gunsul Frasca Architects. Approval of the design by the Pioneer Square Preservation Board was required to ensure that the architecture was appropriate for the historical neighborhood. Local covenant required that key views from the stadium of the Space Needle and the historic clock tower of King Street Station were to be protected. Residents in the upper floors of the south tower are given a partial view of the play taking place within the neighboring stadium. Of the 500 apartments throughout the first phase's complex, only about 30 units will be set aside for low-income residents. The Nolo was completed and opened in September 2013, while The Wave was opened in 2014.

Construction on the second phase, consisting of a 23-story hotel and 21-story office building, began in September 2014 and is expected to last until 2017.
