= Navy Yard City, Washington =

- Census-designated place
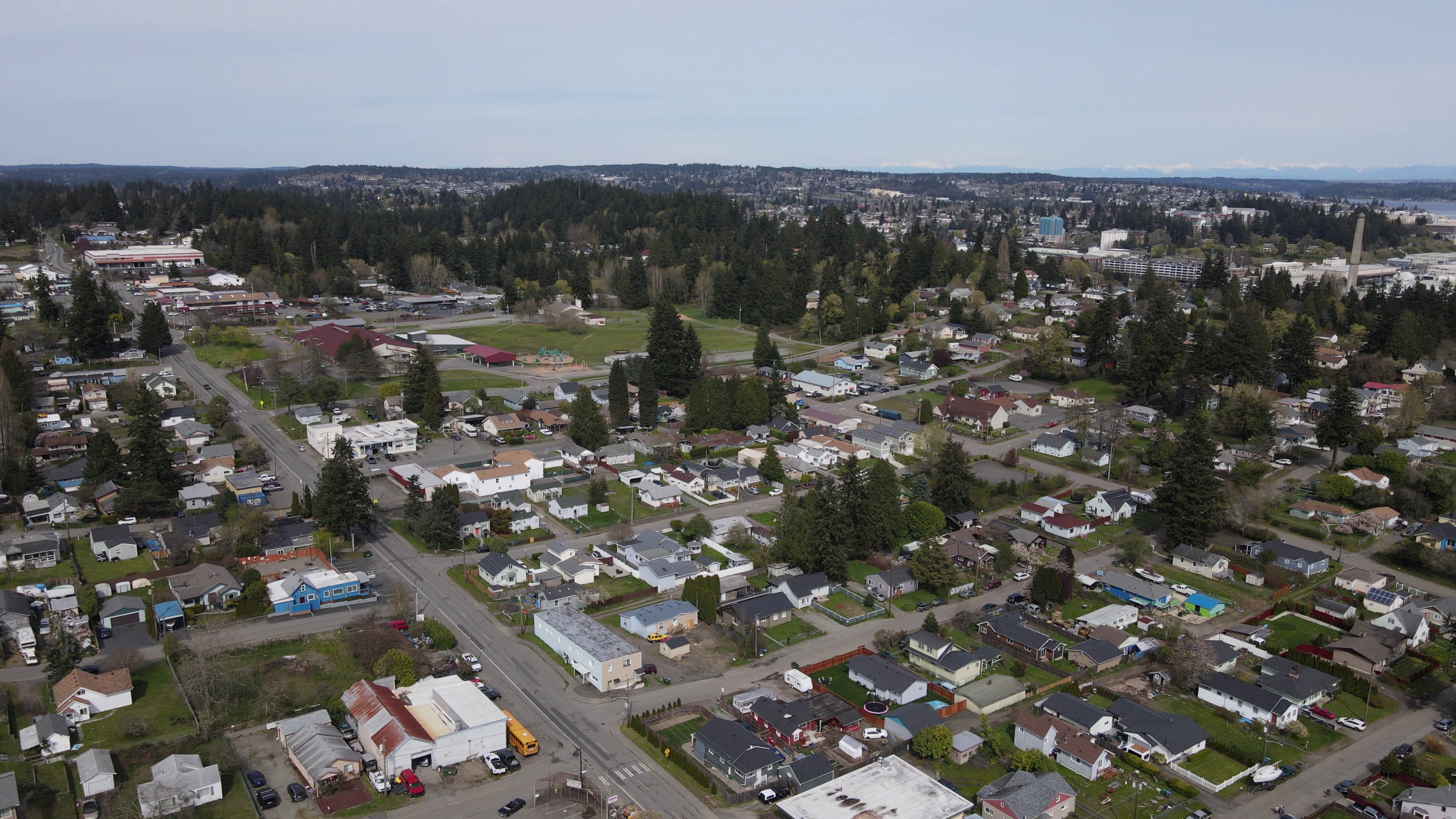
- Aerial view of the neighborhood, with West Hills S.T.E.M. Academy in the center left and Puget Sound Naval Shipyard on the far right.

- Location of Navy Yard City, Washington
- Coordinates: 47°33′03″N 122°39′56″W
- Country: United States
- State: Washington
- County: Kitsap

Area
  - Total: 1.0 sq mi (2.7 km^{2})
  - Land: 0.62 sq mi (1.6 km^{2})
  - Water: 0.42 sq mi (1.1 km^{2})
- Elevation: 26 ft (7.9 m)

Population (2020)
  - Total: 2,759
  - Density: 4,500/sq mi (1,700/km^{2})
- Time zone: UTC-8 (Pacific (PST))
  - Summer (DST): UTC-7 (PDT)
- ZIP Code: 98312
- Area code(s): 360, 564
- FIPS code: 53-48225
- GNIS feature ID: 2408906

Navy Yard City is a census-designated place (CDP) in Kitsap County, Washington, United States. The population was 2,759 at the 2020 census. It is considered a suburb of Bremerton, WA, and is nearly indistinguishable from the surrounding city.

== History ==
Navy Yard City was established in 1909 and resisted several attempts at annexation from the City of Bremerton, which now surrounds the unincorporated community.

In late 1932, the West Side Improvement Club was established in the community, using the motto "A BIGGER AND BETTER NEIGHBORHOOD". The club first sought out to improve the local roads and utilities, with a particular focus on connecting more homes to water lines. In June 1933, the club purchased 18 lots to build a clubhouse, as current meetings were being held in the local elementary school or the Bremerton Booster Clubhouse. Ground was broken in the Spring of 1934, and the clubhouse was finished in June 1937. Built by volunteers and the Works Progress Administration, the large clubhouse and grounds included a playfield and event hall. During World War II, the clubhouse became the regimental headquarters for the Army's 202nd Coast Artillery, protecting the Navy installations in the area. The clubhouse still stands today, with regular events such as bingo and potlucks, along with the regularly scheduled club meetings.

== Geography ==
Navy Yard City is located in south-central Kitsap County and is bordered to the north, east, and west by the city of Bremerton and to the south, across Sinclair Inlet, by the city of Port Orchard, the Kitsap county seat. Washington State Route 3 passes through the west side of Navy Yard City, leading north 16 miles (26 km) to Poulsbo and southwest 34 miles (55 km) to Shelton. Tacoma is 30 miles (48 km) to the southeast via State Route 16.

According to the United States Census Bureau, the Navy Yard City CDP has a total area of 1.0 square mile (2.7 km^{2}), of which 0.62 square miles (1.6 km^{2}) are land and 0.42 square miles (1.1 km^{2}), or 41.18%, are water.

== Demographics ==
Historical population
Census	Pop.	Note	%±
1950	3,030		—
1960	3,341		10.3%
1980	2,594		—
1990	2,905		12.0%
2000	2,638		−9.2%
2010	2,477		−6.1%
2020	2,759		11.4%
U.S. Decennial Census; 1960 1970 1980 1990; 2000 2010

Navy Yard City first appeared as an unincorporated place in the 1950 U.S. census; and as a census designated place in the 1980 U.S. census.

=== 2000 census ===
As of the census of 2000, there were 2,638 people, 1,151 households, and 645 families residing in the CDP. The population density was 4,408.7 people per square mile (1,697.6/km^{2}). There were 1,264 housing units at an average density of 2,112.4/sq mi (813.4/km^{2}). The racial makeup of the CDP was 76.8% White, 7.7% African American, 1.5% Native American, 5.2% Asian, 1.1% Pacific Islander, 2.3% from other races, and 5.3% from two or more races. Hispanic or Latino of any race were 6.4% of the population.

There were 1,151 households, out of which 27.5% had children under the age of 18 living with them, 39.8% were married couples living together, 12.6% had a female householder with no husband present, and 43.9% were non-families. 31.6% of all households were made up of individuals, and 8.4% had someone living alone who was 65 years of age or older. The average household size was 2.29 and the average family size was 2.87.

In the CDP, the population was spread out, with 23.3% under the age of 18, 15.3% from 18 to 24, 33.4% from 25 to 44, 18.1% from 45 to 64, and 10.0% who were 65 years of age or older. The median age was 30 years. For every 100 females, there were 105.1 males. For every 100 females age 18 and over, there were 101.4 males.

The median income for a household in the CDP was $36,285, and the median income for a family was $40,938. Males had a median income of $30,801 versus $21,875 for females. The per capita income for the CDP was $18,532. About 8.8% of families and 12.6% of the population were below the poverty line, including 16.3% of those under age 18 and 2.6% of those age 65 or over.
