= Gorst, Washington =

- Census-designated place
- Location in Washington and the United States Gorst (the United States)
- Coordinates: 47°31′26″N 122°42′19″W
- Country: United States
- State: Washington
- County: Kitsap

Area
  - Total: 0.65 sq mi (1.69 km^{2})
  - Land: 0.65 sq mi (1.69 km^{2})
  - Water: 0 sq mi (0.0 km^{2})
- Elevation: 72 ft (22 m)

Population (2020)
  - Total: 605
  - Density: 927/sq mi (358/km^{2})
- Time zone: UTC-8 (Pacific (PST))
  - Summer (DST): UTC-7 (PDT)
- ZIP Code: 98337
- Area code(s): 360, 564
- FIPS code: 53-27680
- GNIS feature ID: 2584976

Gorst is a census-designated place (CDP) at the head of Sinclair Inlet in Kitsap County, Washington, United States. The population was 605 at the 2020 census. Gorst, located on the shores of Puget Sound, is primarily a town consisting of stores, auto dealerships and espresso stands. A residential area, located west of the water along State Route 3, also exists.

Gorst is named for the Gorst family who settled there in the 1890s. Famous residents of Gorst include Vern C. Gorst, "grandfather" of United Airlines, and Edward S. Curtis and Asahel Curtis, well-known photographers.

== Demographics ==
Historical population
Census	Pop.	Note	%±
2010	592		—
2020	605		2.2%
U.S. Decennial Census; 2000 2010

Gorst first appeared as a census designated place in the 2010 U.S. census.

=== Racial and ethnic composition ===
Gorst CDP, Washington – Racial and ethnic composition Note: the US Census treats Hispanic/Latino as an ethnic category. This table excludes Latinos from the racial categories and assigns them to a separate category. Hispanics/Latinos may be of any race.
Race / Ethnicity (NH = Non-Hispanic)	Pop 2010	Pop 2020	% 2010	% 2020
White alone (NH)	485	437	81.93%	72.23%
Black or African American alone (NH)	1	6	0.17%	0.99%
Native American or Alaska Native alone (NH)	8	0	1.35%	0.00%
Asian alone (NH)	15	14	2.53%	2.31%
Native Hawaiian or Pacific Islander alone (NH)	4	2	0.68%	0.33%
Other race alone (NH)	2	16	0.34%	2.64%
Mixed race or Multiracial (NH)	29	56	4.90%	9.26%
Hispanic or Latino (any race)	48	74	8.11%	12.23%
Total	592	605	100.00%	100.00%
