= Kitsap Mall =

Shopping mall in Silverdale, Washington

- Location: 10315 Silverdale Way NW; Silverdale, Washington, United States
- Coordinates: 47°39′27″N 122°41′26″W
- Opened: August 1, 1985
- Developer: The Winmar Company
- Manager: Jones Lang LaSalle
- Owner: U.S. Bank
- Num. of stores: 73
- Num. of anchor tenants: 7 (6 open 1 vacant)
- Floor area: 848,161 sq ft (78,796.7 m^{2})
- Floors: 1
- Website: shopkitsapmall.com

Kitsap Mall is an indoor shopping mall in Silverdale, Washington, United States. Its anchor tenants include JCPenney, Dick's Sporting Goods, Kohl's, Barnes & Noble, Cost Plus World Market, and WinCo Foods; and one vacant anchor that was once Macy's. It has 73 retail stores, and entertainment and dining establishments total. The mall is owned by Rhino Investments.

== History ==
After many years of planning, Kitsap Mall opened on August 1, 1985. As a result, the retail core of Kitsap County was shifted from Bremerton, Washington to the Silverdale area. The mall's original anchors were Lamonts, Sears, and The Bon Marché. In the coming decades, and after much success, Kitsap Mall nearly doubled in size, adding Mervyns on March 4, 1988, followed by JCPenney in 1989. The Bon Marché was expanded to the east in 1993, nearly doubling its size. Meanwhile, Sears also underwent an expansion, as a result of establishing its standalone HomeLife furniture branch north of the mall in 1994 near the planned Bon Marché Furniture Gallery next to the NorthPoint at Kitsap strip mall, a satellite shopping center developed by Winmar.

In September 2000, Lamonts became Gottschalks after the latter's acquisition of the former in a bankruptcy sale earlier that year. The Bon Marché was re-branded under the Macy's name plate, first as Bon-Macy's in 2003, becoming Macy's in 2005. In 2006, Kitsap Mall received a big change as Gottschalks closed down. The building which housed Gottschalks was torn down and replaced by a new building, which now houses Barnes & Noble and Cost Plus World Market. In 2007, Mervyns closed its Silverdale location, a precursor to the chain's eventual demise in the coming year. It has since been replaced by a new building for Kohl's, which opened on November 11, 2007. 2008 featured the opening of the region's first Hollister store in November, replacing the former Disney Store. Remodelling of the mall's façade and interior was performed in 2011 through 2012.

In June 2013, Kitsap Mall and its surrounding properties (NorthPoint at Kitsap, Kitsap Place) were bought by Starwood Capital Group from Macerich for around $127 million, of which nearly $77 million was from a loan taken from the Royal Bank of Scotland. Revitalization of the mall soon followed, with the addition of Buffalo Wild Wings to the dormant food court, a relocated Victoria's Secret coinciding with the debut of its PINK store, and a newly built H&M throughout 2015. Dick's Sporting Goods was added as an anchor store in 2016.

On August 22, 2019, it was announced that Sears would be closing as part of a plan to close 85 stores nationwide. The closure came as a surprise an unannounced addition to a simultaneous round of store closings in Washington state and nationwide. The store closed on October 20, 2019, after nearly 35 years at the mall.

On May 26, 2021, it was reported that the Kitsap Mall would be sold at a foreclosure auction on August 27 of that year. The original satellite properties, NorthPoint and Kitsap Place, were divested of earlier in the year, preceding the mall's foreclosure. On the day of the planned auction, the auctioneer announced that it would be postponed to September 24. Following the delay, the Kitsap County Assessor appraised the property at $34.5 million against a debt of $74.56 million.

U.S. Bank, which held the loan defaulted on by the owner of the Kitsap Mall, will gain ownership after it was the sole bidder at the mall's foreclosure auction on December 17, 2021.

On August 22, 2022, WinCo Foods, opened in the space formerly occupied by Sears.

On January 9, 2025, it was announced that Macy's would be closing as part of a plan to close 66 stores nationwide. The store closed on March 23, 2025.
