= Belfair State Park =

State park in the U.S. state of Washington

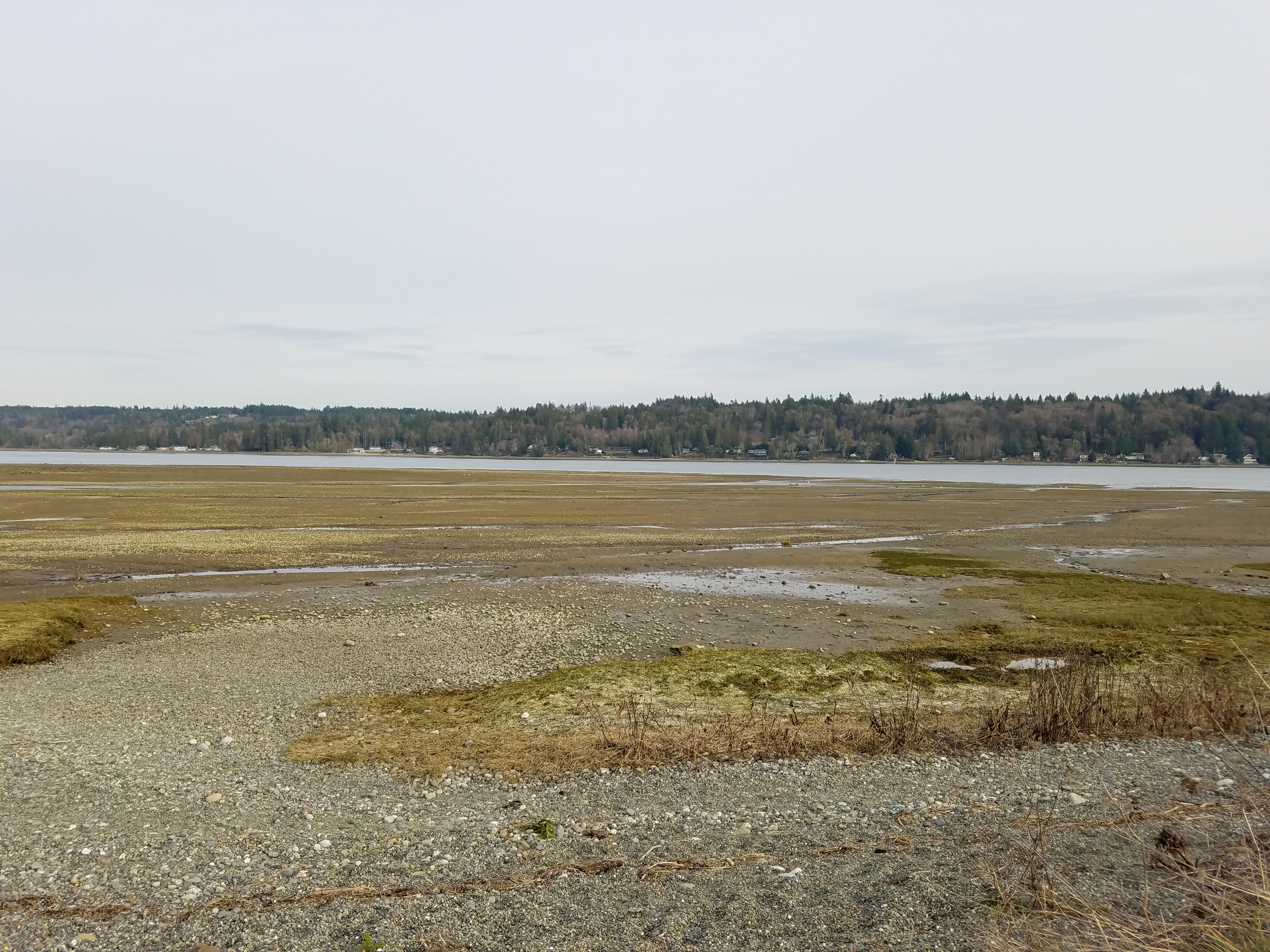
- Beach at Belfair State Park

- Location within Washington (state) Location within the United States
- Interactive map of Belfair State Park
- Location: Mason County, Washington, United States
- Coordinates: 47°25′54″N 122°52′35″W
- Area: 94 acres (38 ha)
- Elevation: 331 ft (101 m)
- Established: 1952
- Administrator: Washington State Parks and Recreation Commission
- Visitors: 471,925 (in 2024)
- Website: Official website

Belfair State Park is a public recreation area located on Hood Canal three miles (4.8 km) southwest of Belfair in Mason County, Washington. The state park consists of 94 acres (38 ha) of tidal flats, wetlands, and beaches with a 3,720-foot (1,130 m) shoreline. Park activities include camping, fishing, swimming, clam digging, crabbing, birdwatching, and field sports.
