= List of former state routes in Washington =

- Highway markers for State Routes 30 and 908

System information
- Notes: Defined by RCW 47.17.420

Highway names
- Interstates: Interstate X (I-X)
- US Highways: U.S. Route X (US X)
- State: State Route X (SR x)

System links
- State highways in Washington; Interstate; US; State; Scenic; Pre-1964; 1964 renumbering; Former

Since the 1964 state highway renumbering, which established the current state route system, the Washington State Department of Transportation has decommissioned some state routes. Once a highway has been decommissioned, the highway is turned over to the local county or city that it is in, they are then responsible for all maintenance on the former highway. All former highways are codified in Washington law under the Revised Code of Washington, chapter 47.17, section 420.

Other highways during the transition between the 1964 renumbering and codification of the new system in 1970 are not listed here.

== State Route 30 ==
State Route 30
- Location: Tonasket – Kettle Falls
- Length: 80.24 mi (129.13 km)
- Existed: 1964–1973

State Route 30 was created during the 1964 state highway renumbering as a replacement for Primary State Highway 4 (PSH 4), which connected U.S. Route 97 (US 97) in Tonasket to Republic, and two secondary highways that continued east to US 395 near Kettle Falls. The 80-mile-long (130 km) highway traveled across Wauconda Pass in the Okanagan Highlands and Sherman Pass in the Kettle River Range, forming the northernmost east–west route in Eastern Washington.

Following the completion of the North Cascades Highway in 1972, SR 20 was extended east to form a cross-state route under a single number. SR 30 and SR 294 were decommissioned in 1973 and incorporated into the extended highway, which became the state's longest.

== State Route 95 ==
U.S. Route 95
- Location: Whitman County
- Length: 0.91 mi (1,460 m)
- Existed: 1926–1979

US 95, a major north–south route between Arizona and the Canadian border, ran for 0.91 miles (1.46 km) in Whitman County, Washington, from 1926 to 1979. The short section, between two crossings of the Idaho state line, connected to US 195 northwest of Lewiston, Idaho. The Washington section was bypassed through the opening of a new highway in October 1977 that stayed within Idaho; the former highway was absorbed into US 195 and a new spur route created in 1979.

== State Route 110 ==
State Route 110
- Location: Bellingham
- Length: 1.30 mi (2.09 km)
- Existed: 1967–1975

State Route 110 was established in 1967 as SSH 1F, a short connector between Chuckanut Drive (SR 11) and I-5 (formerly PSH 1) that had been planned to be built. The route was intended to provide automobile and truck access to the freeway from the Fairhaven neighborhood and nearby industrial areas, bypassing residential areas in Bellingham. The city government had proposed the highway in 1966 and studied several routings for the 1.2-mile (1.9 km) highway, ultimately recommending route that generally followed the former Fairhaven and Southern Railroad; state highway engineers recommended against a limited-access road due to the corridor's development potential.

The state government approved plans in 1969, despite local opposition, and the highway was named the Valley Parkway by the city government in January 1972. Construction began later that year and the highway opened to traffic in November 1972 at a cost of $615,479. SR 11 was routed onto the new highway upon its completion as part of a provision added by the state legislature in 1971. SR 110 was repealed and decommissioned in 1975; the designation was later assigned to a separate route in 1991.

== State Route 111 Temporary ==
State Route 111 Temporary
- Location: Clallam County
- Existed: 1964–1971

State Route 111 was a state highway in the U.S. state of Washington, running from Hurricane Ridge in the Olympic National Park to US 101. A paved highway to Hurricane Ridge was completed by the National Park Service in 1957 as part of their Mission 66 program.

== State Route 113 ==
State Route 113
- Location: Discovery Bay – Coupeville
- Length: 16.29 mi (26.22 km)
- Existed: 1964–1973

State Route 113 was a state highway that connected US 101 at Discovery Bay to SR 525 on Whidbey Island. It was decommissioned in 1973 and replaced by SR 20. The SR 113 designation was reused in 1991 for a highway in western Clallam County.

== State Route 126 ==
State Route 126
- Location: Dayton – Pomeroy
- Length: 16.59 mi (26.70 km)
- Existed: 1964–1992

State Route 126 was an auxiliary route of US 12 in southeastern Washington that ran 17 miles (27 km) from Dayton in the west to Pomeroy in the east. It was a steep and unpaved route that connected two sections of US 12 with the foothills of the Blue Mountains in Columbia and Garfield counties. SR 126 was created during the 1964 state highway renumbering as a replacement for Secondary State Highway 3L. It was removed from the state highway system by the state legislature in 1991 and transferred to county control in April 1992. The former highway followed Patit Road, Hartstock Grade Road, Tucannon Road, Blind Grade Road, Linville Gulch Road, and Tatman Mountain Road.

== State Route 131 ==
State Route 131
- Location: Kittitas County
- Length: 16.43 mi (26.44 km)
- Existed: 1964–1975

State Route 131 was a 16-mile (26 km) highway that connected two sections of US 97 between Ellensburg and Virden in Kittitas County. It was established in 1964 as a replacement for SSH 2I. The highway was rebuilt in 1975 and incorporated into US 97, as it provided a shorter route between Ellensburg and Blewett Pass. SR 131 was later reassigned in 1991 to a short highway near Randle.

== State Route 140 ==
State Route 140
- Location: Washougal – Cape Horn
- Length: 14.08 mi (22.66 km)
- Existed: 1964–1992

== State Route 143 ==
State Route 143
- Location: Plymouth
- Length: 2.38 mi (3.83 km)
- Existed: 1973–1985

State Route 143 was a short connector between the Umatilla Bridge, which crosses over the Columbia River to Umatilla, Oregon, and SR 14 in Plymouth. It was created in 1973 as part of an agreement with the Umatilla County government to transfer control of the Umatilla Bridge to the states of Oregon and Washington once its tolls had paid off its construction bonds. The tolls were removed on August 30, 1974, and ownership was transferred on November 1, with Washington assuming maintenance duties. SR 143 was decommissioned in 1985 and replaced by I-82 and US 395, which were routed over the Umatilla Bridge and a new northbound bridge that opened in 1988.

== State Route 151 ==
State Route 151
- Location: Orondo – Chelan
- Length: 25.29 mi (40.70 km)
- Existed: 1964–1987

== State Route 209 ==
State Route 209
- Location: Plain – Leavenworth
- Length: 19.00 mi (30.58 km)
- Existed: 1964–1992

State Route 209 was a state route in the U.S. state of Washington. It was an auxiliary route of U.S. Route 2. It started at SR 207 in Lake Wenatchee State Park and went east to the community of Plain and then south to U.S. Route 2 near Leavenworth. In January 1964, SSH 15C became SR 209 and SR 207. SR 209 was removed in 1992, and replaced by the Chumstick Highway.

== State Route 220 ==
State Route 220
- Location: Yakima County
- Length: 27.42 mi (44.13 km)
- Existed: 1964–1992

== State Route 232 ==
State Route 232
- Location: Valley
- Length: 1.59 mi (2.56 km)
- Existed: 1964–1992

State Route 232 was a state route in the U.S. state of Washington. It was an auxiliary route of State Route 23. It started at SR 231 and went east to U.S. Route 395. In 1967, SSH 3U became SR 232. SR 232 was later removed in 1992.

== State Route 237 ==
State Route 237
- Location: Skagit County
- Length: 9.07 mi (14.60 km)
- Existed: 1975–1992

== State Route 251 ==
State Route 251
- Location: Northport – Canadian border
- Length: 10.86 mi (17.48 km)
- Existed: 1964–1983

== State Route 276 ==
State Route 276
- Location: Pullman
- Existed: 1973–2016

State Route 276 was a proposed northern bypass of Pullman between US 195 and SR 270 that was never built. It was added to the state highway system in 1973 during property acquisition, but construction was stalled and shelved. A route development plan was published in 2007 but construction was not expected to begin for at least another decade. SR 276 was removed from the state highway system in 2016 to allow for expansion of Pullman–Moscow Regional Airport.

== State Route 294 ==
State Route 294
- Location: Kettle Falls – Tiger
- Length: 36.08 mi (58.07 km)
- Existed: 1964–1973

State Route 294 connected Kettle Falls to SR 31. It was decommissioned in 1973 and replaced by SR 20.

== State Route 306 ==
State Route 306
- Location: Bremerton – Illahee State Park
- Length: 1.51 mi (2.43 km)
- Existed: 1964–1993

State Route 306 was a short auxiliary route of SR 3 in Kitsap County that connected Bremerton to Illahee State Park. It traveled east on Sylvan Way for 1.5 miles (2.4 km) from SR 303 to the state park entrance. SR 306 was created during the 1964 renumbering as a replacement for a branch of SSH 21B, which became SR 303. It was planned to be removed from the highway system by the state legislature in 1991, but a technical error inadvertently removed SR 304 instead. SR 306 was decommissioned in 1993 and SR 304 was restored.

== State Route 311 ==
State Route 311
- Location: Diamond Lake – Usk
- Length: 15.24 mi (24.53 km)
- Existed: 1964–1973

== State Route 402 ==
State Route 402
- Existed: 1964–1971

State Route 402 was a proposed highway that was never built.

== State Route 403 ==
State Route 403
- Location: Altoona – Rosburg
- Length: 6.84 mi (11.01 km)
- Existed: 1964–1992

== State Route 407 ==
State Route 407
- Location: Wahkiakum County
- Length: 11.54 mi (18.57 km)
- Existed: 1964–1992

State Route 407 was an auxiliary route of SR 4 that connected Cathlamet to Elochoman State Forest. It was previously designated as SSH 12D prior to the 1964 renumbering and was removed as a state highway in 1992.

A 1973 proposal to extend SR 407 to a junction with SR 506 near Vader was considered by the state legislature but was not recommended for construction.

== State Route 431 ==
State Route 431
- Location: Kelso
- Length: 0.79 mi (1,270 m)
- Existed: 1964–1992

State Route 431 was a short auxiliary route of SR 4 in Kelso, Washington. It traveled along North Pacific Avenue and North Kelso Avenue to connect its parent highway to an interchange with I-5. The highway was originally assigned the designation of SR 831 during the 1964 renumbering to replace a short branch of PSH 12 that had been created a year earlier. It was renumbered to SR 431 in 1967 following the replacement of parent route US 830 with SR 4. Control of the highway was transferred to local governments in 1992 as part of a swap that included an extension of SR 432.

== State Route 514 ==
State Route 514
- Location: Milton – Edgewood
- Length: 2.45 mi (3.94 km)
- Existed: 1964–1992

SR 514 was a state route in the U.S. state of Washington. It was an auxiliary route of Interstate 5. It started at SR 99 in northeastern Fife, then headed east through Milton to SR 161, where it ended in Edgewood. In January 1964, SSH 1X became SR 514, which originally began at an interchange with I-5 in Fife before being truncated to SR 99. On April 1, 1992, SR 514 became defunct.

== State Route 537 ==
State Route 537
- Location: Skagit County
- Length: 9.07 mi (14.60 km)
- Existed: 1964–1975

== State Route 540 ==
State Route 540
- Location: Lummi Indian Reservation – Ferndale
- Length: 3.51 mi (5.65 km)
- Existed: 1964–1984

State Route 540 was an auxiliary route of I-5 that connected the freeway to the Lummi Indian Reservation. It was added to the state highway system in 1953 as Secondary State Highway 1Z, replacing an earlier county road that served an oil refinery. It was renumbered to SR 540 in 1964. Its intersection with PSH 1/US 99 was replaced with an interchange that was constructed from 1976 to 1977 during a grade separation project on I-5. An earlier plan to build a cloverleaf interchange was scrapped in favor of a conventional diamond interchange. The highway sustained major damage during a December 1979 flood of the Nooksack River.

SR 540 was removed from the state highway system in 1984 and transferred to Whatcom County as part of a swap; the state instead took over maintenance of the Sumas–Kendall Road, which became SR 547.

== State Route 603 ==
State Route 603
- Location: Lewis County
- Length: 16.98 mi (27.33 km)
- Existed: 1964–1992

State Route 603 was an auxiliary route of SR 6 that connected I-5 near Toledo to Winlock and its parent highway west of Chehalis. The majority of the highway was transferred to county control in 1992, with the exception of the east–west section between Winlock and I-5 that was renumbered to part of SR 505.

== State Route 901 ==
State Route 901
- Location: Issaquah – Redmond
- Length: 11.70 mi (18.83 km)
- Existed: 1964–1992

SR 901 was created in 1964 from Secondary State Highway 2D. At the time of its creation, SR 901 began at the intersection of Lake Washington Boulevard and State Route 520, on the border of Kirkland and Bellevue. It then traveled north along Lake Washington Blvd. to downtown Kirkland. At the intersection of Lake St. and Central Way, SR 901 turned right, traveling east along Central Way. It then continued as Redmond Way into Redmond turning south onto West Lake Sammamish Parkway when the roads intersected. It then followed West Lake Sammamish Parkway into Issaquah, ending at its intersection with State Route 900. SR 901 also had a spur leading from West Lake Sammamish Parkway into downtown Redmond along Redmond Way.

In 1971, SR 901 was broken into two parts. The western part, from SR 520 to the intersection of Redmond Way and West Lake Sammamish Parkway (including the spur into Redmond), was renamed State Route 908. The remainder retained the SR 901 designation, with one exception; West Lake Sammamish Parkway lost its state route designation from Exit 13 of Interstate 90 to its intersection with SR 900.

Effective April 1, 1992, SR 901's path was changed again; now it ran through the city of Sammamish along East Lake Sammamish Parkway from Front Street in Issaquah to State Route 202 east of downtown Redmond. In June, SR 901 was completely dropped as a state route in Washington, following outcry from residents on East Lake Sammamish Parkway.

== State Route 908 ==
State Route 908
- Location: Kirkland – Redmond
- Length: 3.14 mi (5.05 km)
- Existed: 1971–2010

== State Route 920 ==
State Route 920
- Location: Redmond
- Length: 1.02 mi (1.64 km)
- Existed: 1975–1985

State Route 920 (SR 920) was the temporary designation for a section of SR 520 bypassing downtown Redmond. It was created in 1975 and opened in July 1977, connecting SR 901 to SR 202. Four years after the missing link in SR 520 was completed in 1981, SR 920 was deleted from the state highway system.
