= Seattle Sounders FC supporters =

Supporters of Seattle Sounders FC

Seattle Sounders FC, a Major League Soccer club established in 2007, has gained a reputation for having passionate supporters since its inaugural season in 2009. There are four recognized supporters groups for Sounders FC: Emerald City Supporters, Gorilla FC, North End Faifthful, and Eastside Supporters. The club has an official member's organization, named the Sounders FC Alliance Council, that comprises season ticket holders and other dues-paying members. The Alliance votes for a council that communicates with the Sounders front office and holds a vote on whether to retain the general manager in elections every four years.

== Demographics ==
The Sounders limit the capacity of Lumen Field capacity for most MLS matches with certain seating sections covered with tarpaulins to provide "a more intimate atmosphere" and opens the entire stadium for international friendly matches. Initially, the capacity was limited to 24,500 before the start of the inaugural season. However, due to high demand, capacity was soon increased multiple times, reaching 35,700 for the 2010 season.

In their debut season, the Sounders amassed the largest average attendance in the league with 30,943 fans. Sounders FC also was rated as the No.50 Best-Supported Club by World Soccer Magazine. In 2010, the Sounders capped their season ticket capacity at 32,000. By late January, there were fewer than 1,000 season-ticket packages remaining.

== Supporter Groups ==
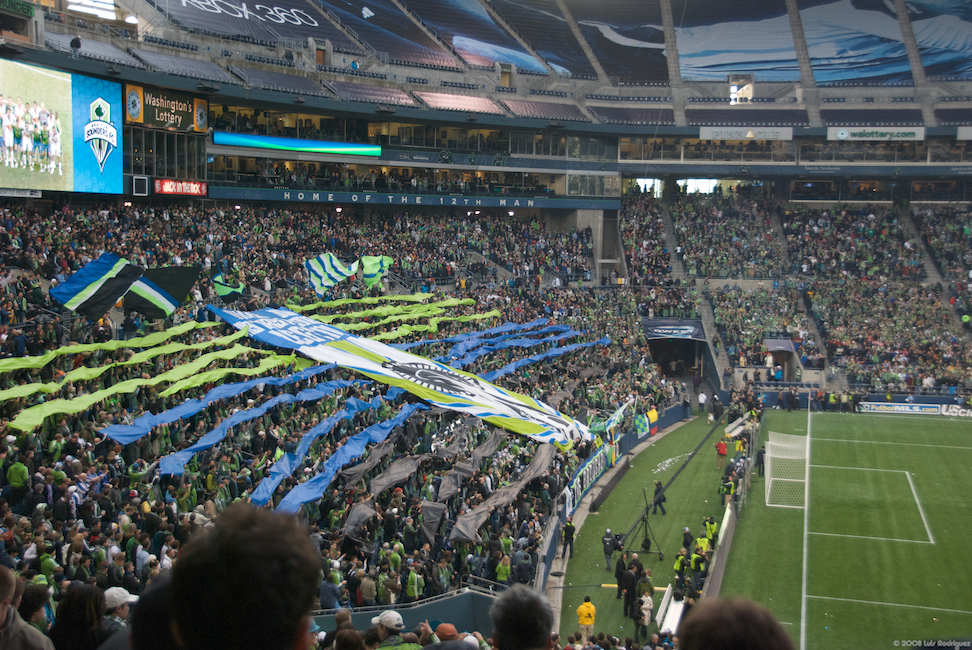
Emerald City Supporters unveil a tifo prior to the club's inaugural game

=== Emerald City Supporters ===
The Emerald City Supporters (ECS) is an independent supporters group that was formed in 2005 to support the USL Sounders. They are currently the largest supporter group and are located in the southern "Brougham End" of the stadium in sections 121–123. The group is known for their displays of tifo and chanting. In addition, the supporter group is an umbrella organization with several sub-supporter groups mostly in different geographical locations such as Los Angeles, Miami, and the northeast metro corridor. As of 2017, the ECS had 5,000 members.

=== Gorilla FC ===
Gorilla FC is a group which supports Sounders FC and also sits in the south end of CenturyLink Field in section 120. They are an antifa (Anti-fascism) support group who categorizes themselves as an anti-racist, anti-sexist, and anti-homophobic supporters group. The group is also active in local charitable causes. In the wake of the Haiti disaster, Gorilla FC raised over $20,000 with the help of players Steve Zakuani, Patrick Ianni, and James Riley.

=== North End Faithful ===
North End Faithful, originally named the North End Supporters, was founded in April 2009 with hopes of uniting the fans of the north end sections of the stadium. They had 55 members by the end of the month and were primarily organized online. NEF primarily sits in the north end of the stadium beneath the "Hawks Nest" in sections 100 and 144–152. They also sit in the upper sections of 100, 101, 102, 142, 143, and 144.

=== Eastside Supporters ===
Eastside Supporters was founded in 2010 and became officially recognized by the alliance council in 2011. The majority of its members are residing or working east of Seattle. Eastside Supporters is a family friendly supporters group always making sure its viewing parties are all ages. The Eastside Supporters section is in 149 and 150 in the "Green Zone" but the majority of its members are located all over the stadium.

== Sound Wave ==
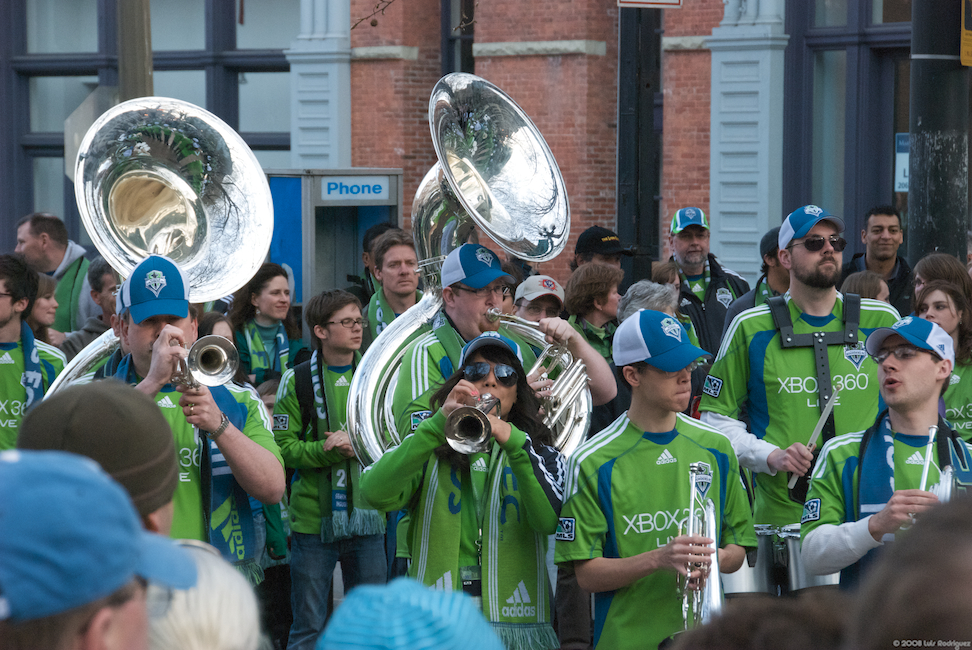
Sounders FC's marching band, The Sound Wave, partaking in the March to the Match

Drew Carey also requested that Sounders FC have their own marching band. They are the first club in MLS to have one. This led to the creation of the Sound Wave, a 53-member marching band consisting of brass and marching percussion. The band plays music from multiple genres such as Latin, rock and pop, and sits with the supporters in the north end of CenturyLink Field. The March to the Match, in which fans march from Occidental Park to CenturyLink before each home game, is led by the Sound Wave.

== Rivalries ==
The Seattle–Portland and Seattle–Vancouver rivalries formed in the years that the NASL-Sounders and USL-Sounders were playing in Seattle. These geographic rivalries are expected to continue when the MLS awards teams to both Portland and Vancouver for the 2011 season. In 2004 the fan-based Cascadia Cup was created to formalize the competition between the Seattle, Portland, and Vancouver USL teams.

The fan-created Heritage Cup competition with the San Jose Earthquakes was begun in the 2009 MLS season. MLS teams that carry on the names of their NASL predecessors are eligible to compete. The results of their league matches determine the winner.

The ECS notes that the Timbers Army are among their biggest rivalries.
