= Gorilla FC =

Independent supporters' group for Seattle Sounders FC

- Abbreviation: GFC
- Established: 2009
- Type: Supporters' group
- Team: Seattle Sounders FC
- Motto: Glory, Fellowship, Community
- Location: Seattle, Washington
- Stadium: Lumen Field
- Website: www.gorillafc.com

Gorilla FC (GFC) is an independent supporters' group for Major League Soccer's Seattle Sounders FC.

== Organization ==
Gorilla FC (Gorilla Football Collective) was formed in 2009 to support Seattle Sounders FC. Gorilla FC's motto is: Glory, Fellowship, Community! It is the reincarnation of the anti-globalization activist group, Guerrilla FC. The group meets before home games at Fado Irish Pub & Restaurant in Seattle before marching with their gorilla mascot, Civ, to Lumen Field. Members are in the south end of the stadium in section 120 with other vocal supporters' groups during the match. GFC supports the team with Tifo displays before and during matches. For away games, the group travels in support of the Sounders and has held viewing parties at the many Soccer bars around Seattle which are posted on their site. It also has a recreational soccer team.

Gorilla FC averages at 300 paid members annually and over 800 unique members since 2009.

Gorilla FC is also a part of the Independent Supporters Council made up of over 22 Supporter Groups in the United States and 18 of the MLS teams represented. The council works to build support nationally for all supporters in Canada and the United States.

== Activism and events ==
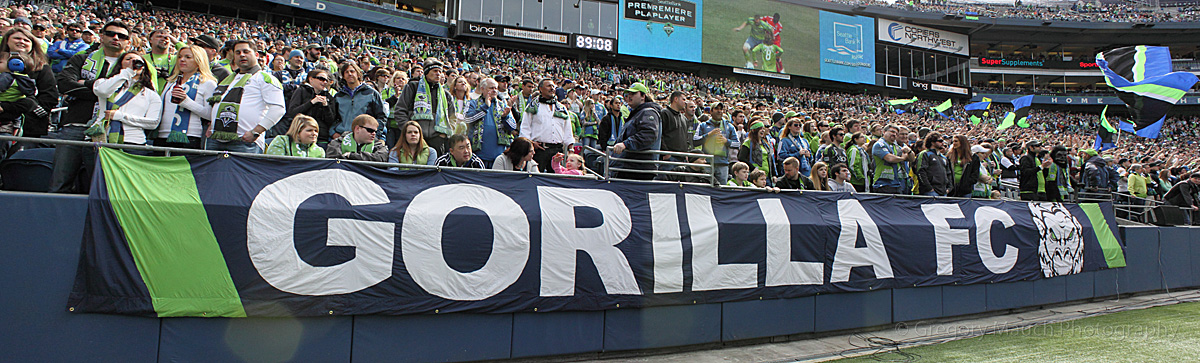
Gorilla FC at Lumen Field during a match

GFC is an antifa group that builds community in Seattle with a soccer influence. The organization was inspired by the left-wing supporter groups of German club St. Pauli. The group promotes equality, calling itself "anti-racist, anti-fascist, anti-sexist and anti-homophobic." GFC has organized protests and actions to combat/disrupt racist and Nazi events held in Seattle. GFC has helped to raise over $250,000 for charities. Gorilla FC works to use soccer as an avenue to support the community, and have fun while doing it. Sounder at Heart covered GFC in 2012.

A cornerstone of the group is coordinating benefits for causes that are important to its members. These have been held for organizations such as El Comité Impulsor del Juicio a Goni, Free Burma Rangers, Red Cross and Opportunitas Aequa. A benefit was held in 2009 for anti-domestic violence group Home Alive. In 2010, a fund-raiser with Steve Zakuani and James Riley of the Sounders to benefit Doctors Without Borders raised over $20,000. Gorilla FC was one of three supporter groups to join in Sounders FC in its partnership with Mercy Corps to raise funds for relief efforts after the 2010 Colombia floods. In 2012, GFC held a benefit in support of One Hundred for Haiti. GFC participates in Movember annually. Gorilla FC also has benefits and worked with the following organizations: Atlantic Street Center, Treehouse, America Scores Seattle, Seattle Street Soccer, Young Adults in Transition, Seattle Ed. Access, First Place Schools, Big Brothers Big Sisters, Special Olympics WA., Renway BG, Redmond Fire House, Seattle Works, Imagine Scholar SA, Youthcare, Mockingbird Society, Seattle Cancer Care Alliance and Athletes For Kids.

James Riley, a former Sounders FC defender, and Gorilla FC organize a yearly youth tournament to benefit Renway Boys and Girls Club.

Gorilla FC is involved with an annual Raise the Red Card Against Racism and Homophobia display coordinated with the ISC.

GFC has held other events such as a meet-and-greet at Fado with players Sebastien Le Toux and Taylor Graham before the 2009 MLS Cup in Seattle. Gorilla FC holds an End of Year party with presenting the GFC player of the Year award, titled The Big John Award. Kasey Keller was the winner in 2011. Michael Gspurning won it in 2012. Ozzie Alonso won it in 2013. Trips to away matches have included those to Cascadia rivals Vancouver and Portland.

== See also ==
- Emerald City Supporters
