= Emerald City Supporters =

Independent supporters' group for Seattle Sounders FC

- Abbreviation: ECS
- Established: 2005
- Type: Supporters' group
- Team: Seattle Sounders FC
- Motto: The Game Belongs to The People
- Location: Seattle, Washington
- Stadium: Lumen Field
- Website: www.weareecs.com

Emerald City Supporters (ECS) is an independent supporters' group for Major League Soccer's Seattle Sounders FC. The ECS is known for large choreographed tifo displays.

== History and name ==
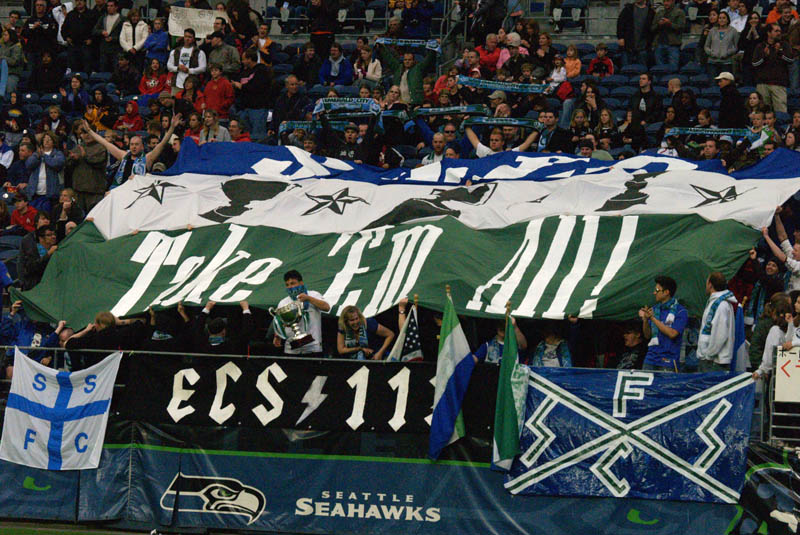
Supporters in 2008

Emerald City Supporters was founded in 2005 by the supporters of the Seattle Sounders soccer team that played in the United Soccer Leagues First Division. The name first appeared on a banner used as early as 2003 by a now defunct supporters' group known as The Pod, and was adopted by the new group upon its formation between the 2004 and 2005 seasons. The name reflects city pride, as Emerald City is a well-known nickname for the city of Seattle. When the arrival of a new MLS franchise in Seattle was announced in 2008 and it was clear that the USL Sounders were going to fold, the ECS decided to become supporters of the new club. When the name of the new club was decided by vote, the ECS was very active in rallying votes for the Sounders moniker. When the Sounders played in the USL the ECS had fewer than a hundred members. The arrival of MLS in Seattle resulted in a rapid growth of ECS membership, and by the inaugural game of Seattle Sounders FC in March 2009 ECS had about 600 members. By the end of 2009 the membership had risen to 1,400. In June 2010 the membership had passed the 2,000 mark. In 2012 the annual paid membership was about 2,700.

== Gameday ==
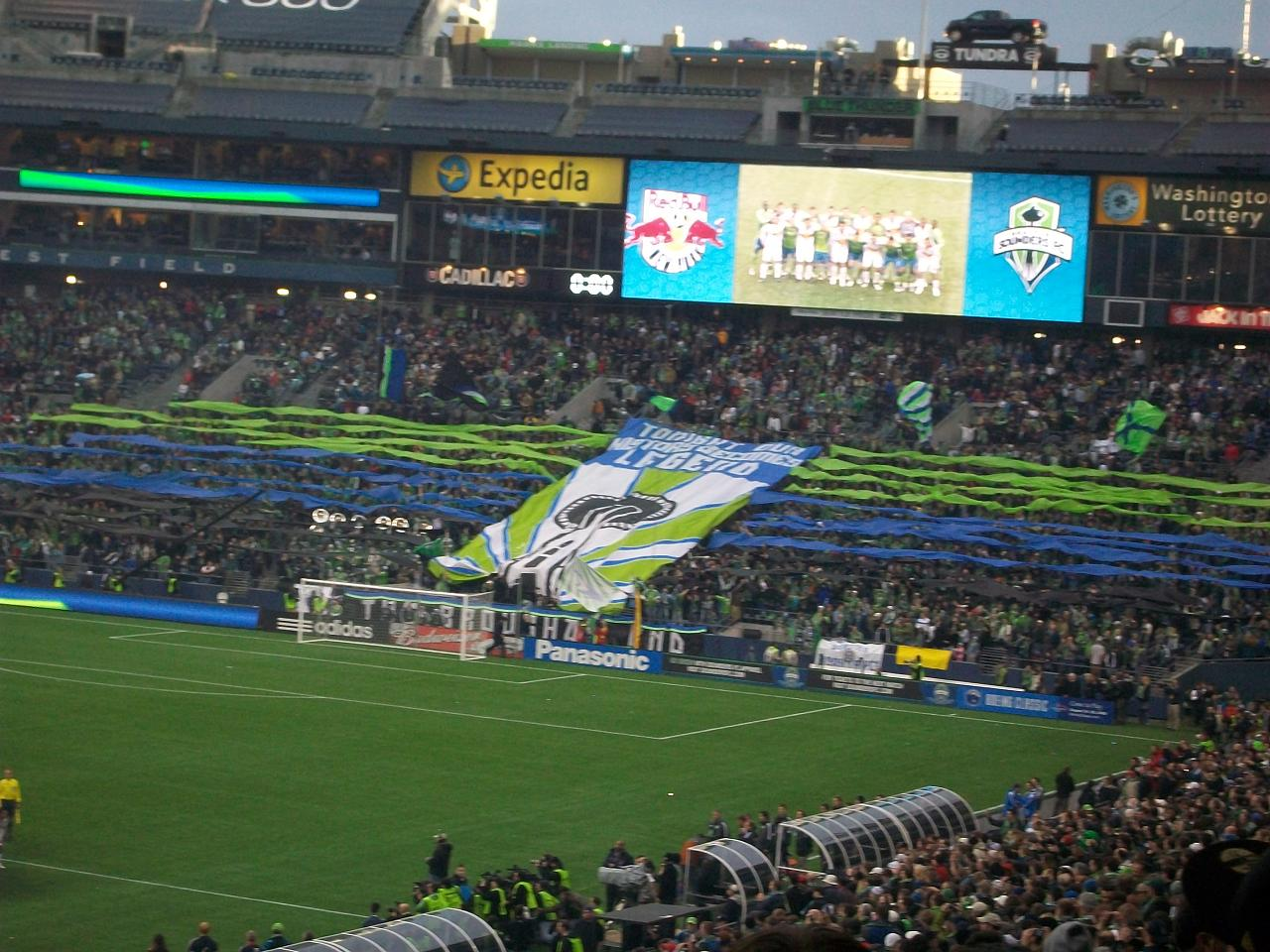
A display for Sounders FC's inaugural game

ECS occupies sections 121–123 at Lumen Field, the home ground of the Sounders. These sections are general-admission sections located behind the goal at the south end of Lumen Field, also known as the "Brougham End" after the street (South Royal Brougham Way) that runs along the south edge of the stadium complex. On the day of a home game the ECS congregates at bars in the Pioneer Square area, and marches together the half-mile distance from Occidental Park to Lumen Field. During games the ECS contributes to a supporters atmosphere through standing, singing, and tifo. Songs are led by a capo with the aid of a PA system and megaphones.

== Songs ==
Emerald City Supporters are vocal and seek organized and forceful expressions during games. Their style of cheering would normally be reserved for teams in Europe or Latin America. The European influence shows in songs that involve coordinated movement, such as pogoing and scarf waving, and in many traditional British football chants such as Sounders Till I Die and Guinness Boys. In addition, the ECS has adapted some punk rock songs such as the Sick of It All song "Us vs. Them"'. At kick-off, the ECS sings the first verse of the Perry Como song "Seattle".

== Sub-groups ==
Several sub-groups are designated by the Emerald City Supporters on geographical, cultural, or occupational lines. To be considered an official regional sub-group there must be at least 25 ECS members affiliated with the group; groups based on a common cause other than geography (such as La Barra Fuerza Verde and Pride of the Sound) require 50 ECS members to be officially recognized. Among the largest sub-groups is 253 Defiance, representing the Pierce County area; the Armed Services Group; La Barra Fuerza Verde, representing the Latino community in the Northwest; Dry Side Supporters represent central and eastern Washington (Yakima being the center of DSS); Bellingham Nightwatch, representing Whatcom and the surrounding northern border counties; West Sound Armada, representing Kitsap County and areas west of Puget Sound. Major subgroups across the country include: the Heartland Horde representing the Midwest and Rocky Mountain region; Tropic Sound, representing Florida, the coastal south, and the Caribbean Islands; Seattle Sounders East, representing the Northeastern states; Anchor n Rose 48, standing strong in rival territory Portland, OR.

== Rival groups ==
- Timbers Army
- Vancouver Southsiders

== See also ==
- Gorilla FC
