= Lumen Field =

Stadium in Seattle, Washington

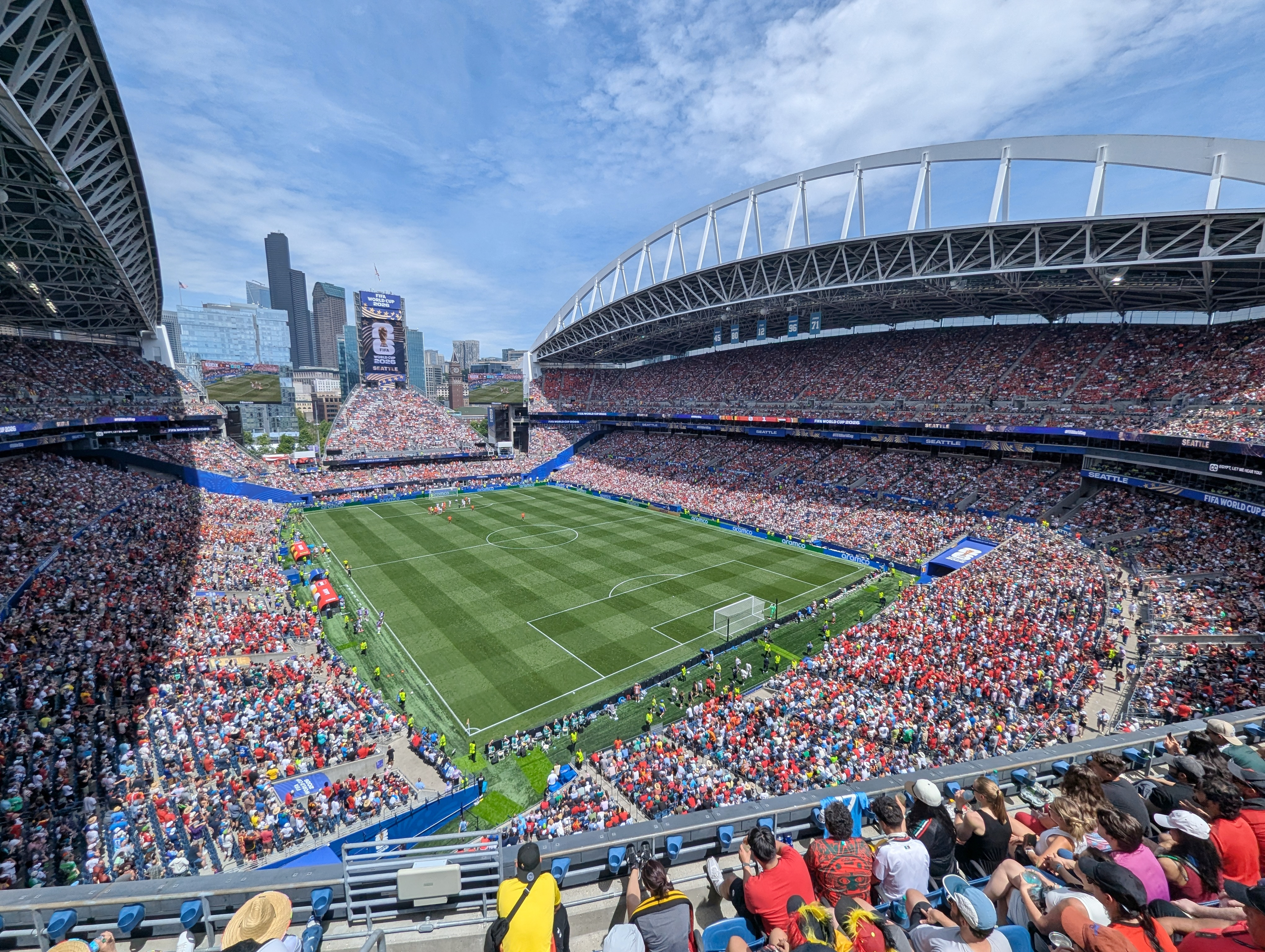
- View across Lumen Field during the 2026 FIFA World Cup (Note: View from near the southern end of the eastern grandstand's lower deck, looking northeast. The field, dressed in a soccer format, is decorated for the 2026 FIFA World Cup.)

- Location in Seattle Location in Washington State Location in the United States
- Former names: Seahawks Stadium (2002–2004); Qwest Field (2004–2011); CenturyLink Field (2011–2020); Seattle Stadium (2026 FIFA World Cup)
- Address: 800 Occidental Avenue South
- Location: Seattle, Washington, U.S.
- Coordinates: 47.5952°N 122.3316°W
- Owner: Washington State Public Stadium Authority
- Operator: First & Goal Inc.
- Capacity: 68,740 (NFL); Expandable to 72,000 (for special events); 37,722 (MLS / XFL); Expandable to 68,740 (for special events); 10,000 (NWSL)
- Executive suites: 111
- Surface: FieldTurf CORE
- Scoreboard: 84 ft × 24 ft (26 m × 7.3 m); 44 ft × 50 ft (13 m × 15 m)
- Record attendance: Concert: 77,286 (Ed Sheeran, August 26, 2023); Soccer: 69,314 (Seattle Sounders FC vs. Inter Miami, August 31, 2025)
- Field size: American football: 120 yd × 53.3 yd (109.7 m × 48.8 m); Soccer: 116 yd × 75 yd (106.07 m × 68.58 m)
- Public transit: Stadium; International District/Chinatown; King Street Station
- Parking: 3,100 spaces (parking garage); 7,500 spaces (in surrounding lots)

Construction
- Groundbreaking: September 28, 1998 (complex)
- Opened: July 28, 2002; 24 years ago
- Cost: $430 million (entire complex) ($770 million in 2025 dollars)
- Architects: Ellerbe Becket; LMN Architects; Streeter & Associates
- Structural engineer: Magnusson Klemencic Associates
- Services engineer: McKinstry/Cochran
- General contractor: Turner Construction Company

Tenants
- Seattle Seahawks (NFL) 2002–present; Seattle Sounders FC (MLS) 2009–present; Seattle Reign FC (NWSL) 2022–present; Seattle Bowl (NCAA) 2002; Seattle Sounders (A-League / USL 1) 2003–2007; Washington Huskies (NCAA) 2011–2012; Seattle Dragons/Sea Dragons (XFL) 2020, 2023

Website
- lumenfield.com

Lumen Field is a multi-purpose stadium in Seattle, Washington, United States. Located in the city's SoDo neighborhood, it is the home field for the Seattle Seahawks of the National Football League (NFL), Seattle Sounders FC of Major League Soccer (MLS), and Seattle Reign FC of the National Women's Soccer League (NWSL). It has a seating capacity of 68,740 spectators for NFL games and 37,722 for most MLS matches. The complex also includes the Event Center, which is home to the Washington Music Theater (WaMu Theater), a parking garage, and a public plaza. Located within a mile (1.6 km) of Downtown Seattle, the stadium is accessible by multiple freeways and forms of mass transit.

The stadium was built between 2000 and 2002 on the site of the Kingdome after voters approved funding for the construction in a statewide election held in June 1997. This vote created the Washington State Public Stadium Authority to oversee public ownership of the venue. The owner of the Seahawks, Paul Allen, formed First & Goal Inc. to develop and operate the new facilities. Allen was closely involved in the design process and emphasized the importance of an open-air venue with an intimate atmosphere. Originally called Seahawks Stadium, it was renamed Qwest Field in 2004 when telecommunications carrier Qwest acquired the naming rights. The stadium became known as CenturyLink Field following Qwest's June 2011 acquisition by CenturyLink and was nicknamed "The Clink" as a result; it received its current name in November 2020 with CenturyLink's rebrand to Lumen Technologies.

Seahawks fans at Lumen Field have twice claimed the Guinness World Record for loudest crowd roar at an outdoor stadium, in 2013 and 2014. The crowd's notorious noise has also contributed to the team's home field advantage with an increase in false start (movement by an offensive player prior to the play) and delay of game (failure of the offense to snap the ball prior to the play clock expiring) penalties against visiting teams. The stadium was the first in the NFL to install a FieldTurf artificial surface. Numerous college and high school football games have also been played at the stadium, including the 2011 and 2024 Apple Cups and all Washington Huskies home games during the renovation of Husky Stadium in 2012. The XFL's Seattle Dragons began playing at Lumen Field in 2020 and returned in 2023 as the Sea Dragons.

Lumen Field is also designed for soccer. The first sporting event held included a United Soccer Leagues (USL) Seattle Sounders match. The USL team began using the stadium regularly for home games in 2003. The MLS expansion team, Seattle Sounders FC, began its inaugural season in 2009 at the stadium. Lumen Field was the site of the MLS Cup in 2009 and 2019; the latter set a new attendance record for the stadium with 69,274 spectators. The venue also hosted the 2010 and 2011 tournament finals for the U.S. Open Cup as well as the second leg of the 2022 tournament final for the CONCACAF Champions League; the Sounders won all three finals, with new tournament attendance records set for each final (or leg) hosted at Lumen Field. The stadium hosted several CONCACAF Gold Cup matches, and the Copa América Centenario in 2016. Temporarily renamed by FIFA to Seattle Stadium, the stadium hosted six matches during the 2026 FIFA World Cup.

== Funding ==
The Seahawks played their home games at the Kingdome from their 1976 inaugural season until 1999, sharing the stadium with Major League Baseball's Seattle Mariners and the National Basketball Association's Seattle SuperSonics. In 1995 a proposal was made to issue county bonds to fund a remodeling project of the facility. The proposal failed, and as a result, Seahawks' owner Ken Behring threatened to sell or move the team (likely to Los Angeles). In 1997, local billionaire Paul Allen pledged to acquire the team if a new stadium could be built and said that the team could not be profitable until they left the Kingdome. He asked the state legislature to hold a special statewide referendum on a proposal to finance a new stadium. Allen also agreed to cover any cost overruns. With Allen agreeing to pay the $4 million cost, the legislature agreed. The vote was scheduled to be held in June 1997 but in May a Seattle resident filed a lawsuit that claimed the legislature did not have authority to call for such a vote, since it would be paid for by a private party who could gain from the result. The case was delayed until after the vote. The proposal was pitched to voters as providing both a new home for the Seahawks and a venue for top-level soccer. It passed on June 17, 1997, with 820,364 (51.1%) in favor and 783,584 against. The vote was close in Seattle, but it received 60% approval in Seattle's northern and eastern suburbs. The public funding was unpopular farther away in the eastern portion of the state. In October, a Thurston County Superior Court judge ruled that the legislature acted properly and in the public's interest, and he dismissed the pending lawsuit. The Washington Supreme Court upheld the decision that December.

Voter approval of the referendum created a public–private partnership. The Washington State Public Stadium Authority was created to oversee public ownership of the stadium, exhibition center, and parking garage complex. Allen purchased the Seahawks and formed First & Goal Inc. to build and operate the facility. The budget for the project was $430 million. Of this cost, $44 million was allotted to build the Event Center, $26 million for the parking garage, and $360 million for the stadium. First & Goal was to cover cost overruns and pay up to $130 million of the project while the contribution from the public was capped at $300 million. The public funding package included new sports-related state lottery games, taxes on the facility's admissions and parking, sales tax credits and deferrals, and an eight-year extension of the 2% tax on hotel rooms in King County. The taxes on admissions and parking were set below the authorized 10% to preserve the tax-exempt status of the project's bonds, which were first issued on May 1, 1999; the percentage was increased to the full amount when the bonds were completely paid on January 1, 2021, with the taxes subsequently serving as dedicated funding sources for maintenance and modernization of the facilities. Furthermore, a clause in the referendum required Allen or his estate to give the Public Stadium Authority 10% of the proceeds from the sale of a majority or all of their interest in the Seahawks if they had done so before or on the 25th anniversary of the first bond sale. The proceeds would have been reserved for the state's public schools had a sale of the team occurred before the bonds were fully paid off; any sale in between the bond retirement and the clause expiration would have seen the proceeds go towards improvements to the stadium instead.

In September 1998, First & Goal signed a 30-year stadium lease that includes options to extend for another 20. Per the agreement, the Public Stadium Authority receives $850,000 a year from First and Goal (adjusted for inflation), and First & Goal keeps all revenue from the stadium and parking garage. The company receives 80% of the revenue from the exhibition center while the other 20 percent is allotted to a state education fund. First & Goal is responsible for all operating and maintenance costs, expected to be $6 million a year, and must keep the facility in "first-class" condition. Other details of the lease include the availability of affordable seats, a coordinated effort with neighboring T-Mobile Park (the Mariners' current ballpark) to prevent gridlock, a provision for naming rights, the investment in public art at the stadium, and the giveaway of a luxury suite to a fan each Seahawks' game.

== Construction and layout ==
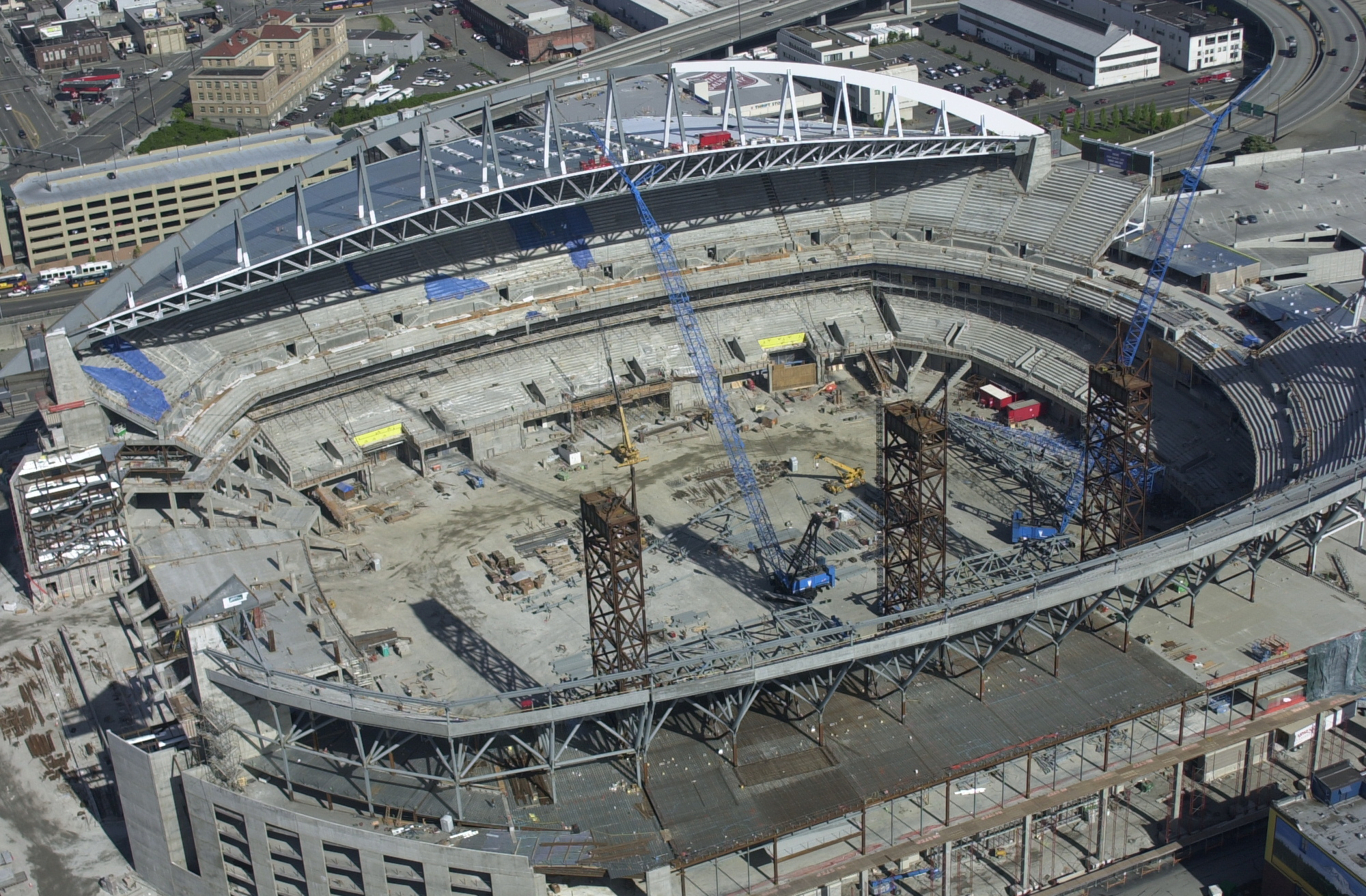
The stadium under construction in 2001

The architectural firm Ellerbe Becket, in association with Loschky, Marquardt and Nesholm (LMN) Architects of Seattle, designed the 1.5 million square feet (140,000 m^{2}) project. Allen was closely involved during the design process. While growing up he attended games at the University of Washington's (UW) outdoor Husky Stadium. His goal was to create a similar experience and atmosphere at the new venue. The exhibition center portion of the project was designed over a period of 14 months by LMN Architects while First & Goal managed the construction. Town meetings were held to discuss the impact on the public, and the company created a $6 million mitigation fund for nearby neighborhoods. In accordance with a program established by the building team, contracts totaling $81 million were awarded to minority- and women-owned businesses. Union apprentices made up 19% of the workforce through another program with local trade unions.

Construction of the new exhibition center and parking garage was set to commence on September 19, 1998, but prolonged lease discussions between First & Goal and the Public Stadium Authority delayed the official groundbreaking to September 28. The exhibition center opened on October 30, 1999, and subsequently hosted its first event on November 4. On March 26, 2000, to make way for the stadium, the Kingdome was demolished in the world's largest implosion of a single concrete structure. Almost all of the Kingdome rubble was recycled with roughly half used for the new stadium. The designers were challenged by the soft soil at the site since it was a tidal marsh until public works projects in the early 20th century adjusted the waterline of nearby Elliott Bay. The top layer is a soft fill taken from the grading projects that had leveled portions of Seattle's hills. To account for the soft soil, the complex sits on over 2,200 pilings driven 50 to 70 ft (15 to 21 m) below the ground to form what is essentially a pier for the foundation. Eight individually connected sections were built to account for the soil concerns, temperature effects, and the potential for earthquakes. The adjoining exhibition center and parking garage are separate structures and are not part of the eight-section stadium.

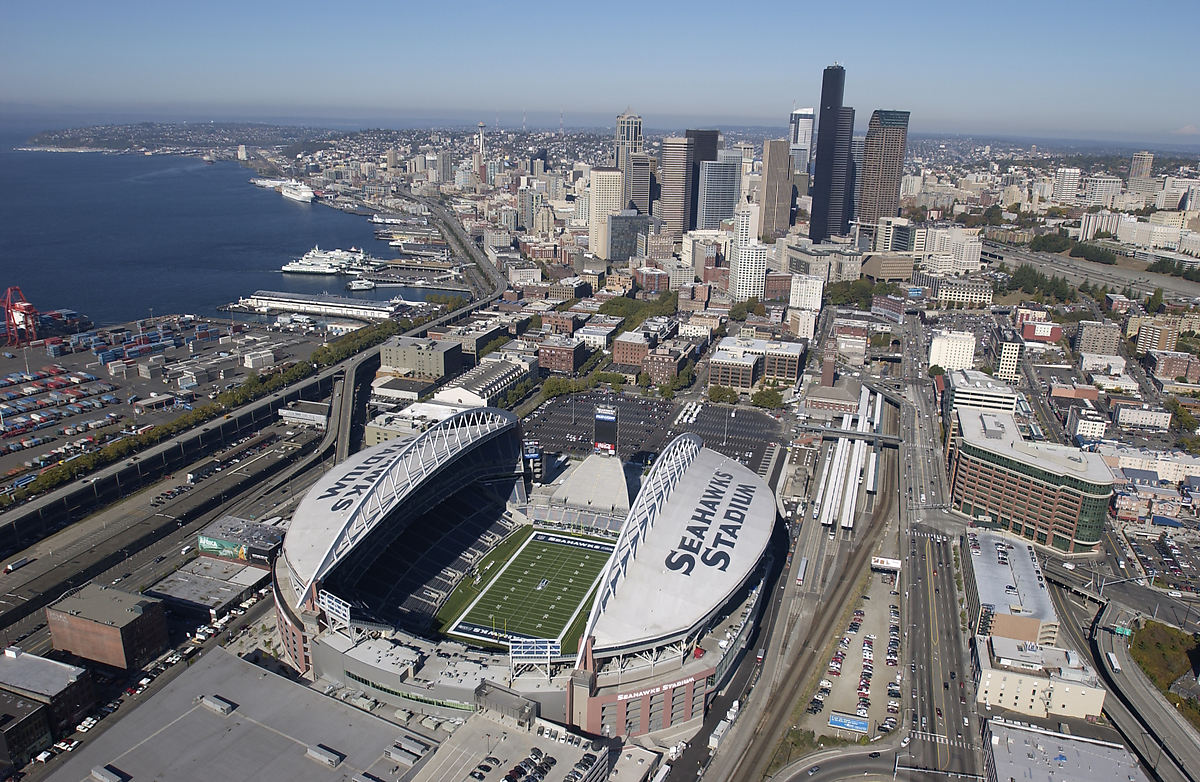
The stadium after completion in 2002

The site of Lumen Field is the smallest of those developed for new NFL stadiums, at 30 acres (12 ha). The upper levels were cantilevered over the lower sections to fit within the limited footprint. Along with the angle of seats and the placement of the lower sections closer to the field, this provided a better view of the field than typically seen throughout the country and allowed for a 67,000-seat capacity. Space is available to increase the total capacity to 72,000 for special events. Included in the capacity are 111 suites and over 7,000 club seats. The stadium has 1,400 seats for those with disabilities and their companions located in various sections. In 2009, Qwest Field ranked 21st out of the 31 stadiums in the NFL for total seating capacity.

The configuration of Lumen Field is a U-shape with an open north end to provide views of downtown Seattle and the large north plaza. The large retractable roof of T-Mobile Park along with Mount Rainier to the southeast can be seen from the partially open south end. The stadium's concourses were built to be wide, and they provide additional views of the surrounding area. A 13-story tower was erected at the north end of the stadium that visually complements the Seattle skyline. The tower features a vertically oriented scoreboard which is the first of its kind in the NFL. At the base is bleacher seating for 3,000 called the "Hawks' Nest". Another addition not previously seen in the NFL are field-level luxury suites located directly behind the north end zone.

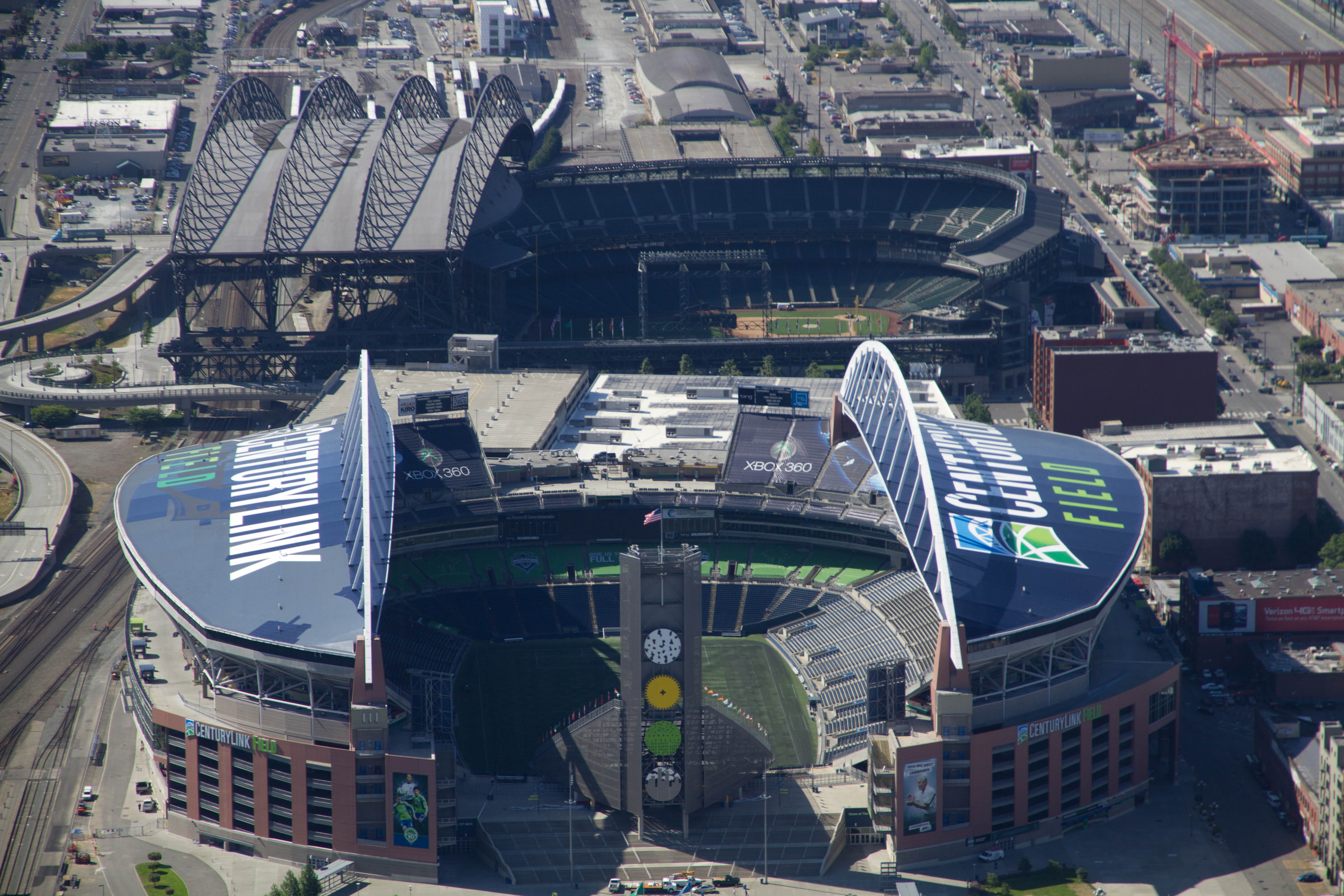
The roofs of Lumen Field and T-Mobile Park

Allen rejected plans for a retractable roof during the early stages of the stadium's design. The lack of a retractable roof made it open to the elements, provided better views, and reduced the total cost of the project. The roof, at 200,000 sq ft (19,000 m^{2}), covers 70% of the seats but leaves the field open. The roof spans 720 ft (220 m) between concrete pylon supports at the north and south ends of the stadium. Its two expansive sections are held from below by trusses. From above, two arches with additional supports rise 200 ft (61 m) over the field. Post-tensioned cables were used to achieve its final shape and positioning. To minimize damage in the event of an earthquake, the roof has a friction pendulum damper system. This disconnects the roof from the support pylons so that it can move independently of the structure. The technology had never been applied to a large-scale roof before Lumen Field. A 6.8-magnitude earthquake struck the Seattle area during construction. The structure responded as expected by the designers, and there was minimal damage. The project was completed on budget and a month ahead of schedule.

The roof was originally painted white to aesthetically distinguish it from both T-Mobile Park and the nearby industrial area; however, the paint gradually turned ash gray despite cleanings and repaintings, prompting a blue-colored repaint of the roof from May to July 2010. Light-emitting diodes following the outline of the stadium's logo were subsequently installed on the roof in October 2019. The east side of the stadium has a large glass curtain wall that faces the nearby International District. The exterior of the stadium also consists of salmon-colored concrete, and the west side of the structure is partially clad with red brick. The coloring and facade were designed so the stadium would blend with the older buildings in neighboring Pioneer Square. To reduce costs, the exterior was not completed with brick or ornate steel work.

In 2015, the stadium was expanded with the addition of the Toyota Fan Deck (Note: The Toyota Fan Deck is sponsored by the Western Washington Toyota Dealers, an association of local Toyota dealers; it is not sponsored directly by Toyota.) on 5,775 square feet (536.5 m^{2}) of space at its southern end; privately funded by the Seahawks, it consisted of a new 12 Flag raising platform flanked by two 500-seat sections, pushing the capacity of the stadium to 68,000. The 1,000 additional seats were made available to then-current season ticket holders, with remaining seats allocated to the Blue Pride waiting list for season tickets. The stadium also has additional seats that can be deployed for special events, bringing the maximum capacity to 72,000.

Despite the presence of an Internet service provider as the naming rights holder, Seahawks executives were reluctant to install a Wi-Fi network at Lumen Field due to skepticism regarding its return on investment even as the smartphone gained widespread public adoption in the early 2010s. In response to complaints from attendees regarding the lackluster performance of the cellular networks around the stadium, AT&T installed a distributed antenna system (DAS) inside it in 2011. AT&T upgraded the DAS in September 2013, investing $10 million into adding 700 antennas supporting 3G and LTE bands across 47 zones within the stadium; the DAS also accommodated the networks of Verizon, Sprint, and T-Mobile, with the former two providing their own upgrades. Amid an NFL initiative to install robust Wi-Fi networks at every stadium by 2015, the Seahawks contracted with Extreme Networks and Verizon to install separate Wi-Fi networks within Lumen Field ahead of the 2014 season. Extreme's installation involved 757 wireless access points (WAPs), 162,000 feet (49,000 m) of Ethernet cable, and 6,600 feet (2,000 m) of fiber-optic cable, with the vast majority of WAPs installed under seats since the stadium's open-air design precludes installing them from above to maximize efficiency. Wi-Fi traffic for each Seahawks game was estimated at a maximum of 4 TB of data on average when the network was launched; it steadily increased to over 16 TB per game by 2026, with more than half of stadium attendees using the network per event.

Lumen Field underwent minor renovations in 2022 as the stadium marked its twentieth anniversary. Improvements to the stadium made before the start of the 2022 Seahawks season include the conversion of an unused 6,300-square-foot (590 m^{2}) space below the Hawks' Nest into a food and beverage area, the addition of an open cashierless concession area on the concourse behind the Toyota Fan Deck, and the replacement of a pair of video display boards at the north end of the stadium with Diamond Vision boards from Mitsubishi Electric that were more than double the size of the pre-existing ones. A 1,800-square-foot (170 m^{2}) pregame hospitality area adjacent to the home team's locker room was then opened for the 2023 Seahawks season; named the Tunnel Club, it allows spectators to view players walking between the locker room and the field. Additional planned renovations include the creation of two standing room open-air decks.

In October 2023, the stadium's gates and concourses were renamed under a new "neighborhoods" program for destination signage; the four "neighborhoods" are Cityside (north), Cascade (east), Rainier (south), and Olympic (west). The concourses at Lumen Field are staggered: Olympic Hall on the west side is at field level, while Cascade Main on the east side and Rainier Main on the south side are elevated one level above. The club and suite levels sit above the Cascade and Olympic concourses, followed by the "Summit" levels for the Cascade, Rainier, and Olympic "neighborhoods". Lumen Field has 45 concession stands, 63 restrooms with 799 toilets and 364 urinals, 12 elevators, and over 500 television screens. The stadium has a public art collection that includes Earth Dialogue, a series of four disks by Bob Haozous on the north side of the Hawks' Nest that faces Downtown Seattle.

== Surface ==
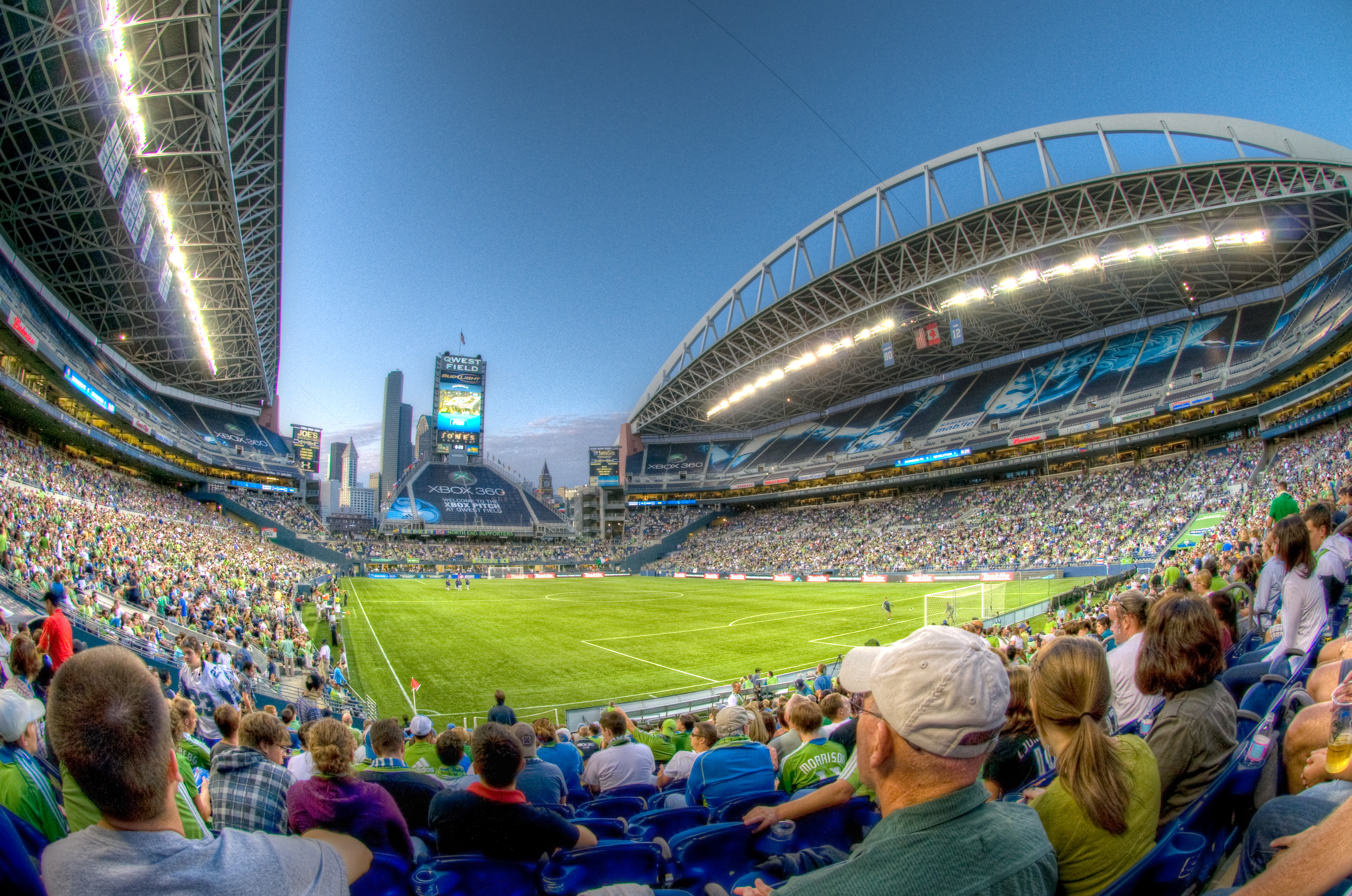
The stadium prior to a Sounders match on FieldTurf

The 1997 state referendum stated that the stadium would feature a natural grass surface, but FieldTurf was not an option when the stadium was originally presented to voters according to the Public Stadium Authority. Seahawks management reconsidered the playing surface after the Seahawks played on FieldTurf at Husky Stadium during the 2000 and 2001 seasons. Artificial turf was installed because it was easier to maintain than natural grass. The potential damage to a natural grass field caused by Seattle's frequent rain also made the surface an appealing option. In order to keep a grass surface robust under heavy football use during late fall and early winter rains, a $1.8 million irrigation and heating system would have been required. The coach of the Seahawks at the time, Mike Holmgren, said that FieldTurf installation was the right decision and stated that "the players love it, and I think this surface will offer a better product on the field for the fans." Local soccer fans were concerned that the lack of a natural grass field would hinder Seattle's chances of receiving an MLS expansion franchise. They asserted that voters had approved the facility with the understanding that the new stadium was intended for soccer as well as football. In a compromise, First & Goal agreed to pay for grass to be installed for special events when needed.

In 2002, Seahawks Stadium became the first stadium in the NFL to install a FieldTurf artificial field. The surface is made of plastic fibers rooted in a mixture of ground rubber and sand. The field was replaced in early 2008 after tests showed that compression of sand and rubber increased the risk of player injuries. For the second installation, FieldTurf won the bid over Polytan. For the replacement surface, a one-inch (two and one-half centimeters) poured rubber foundation was added to prevent the compression from reoccurring. Under the naming rights agreement, Qwest paid $500,000 for the installation and First & Goal paid the remaining amount, which was undisclosed. By 2010 the FieldTurf's quality had decreased with the blades becoming matted down. It also failed FIFA's quality testing to be ranked 2 Star. A new FieldTurf surface was laid down in 2012 and it met the requirements of a 2 Star field after testing. A new turf field, using the FieldTurf Revolution 360, was installed in February 2016 ahead of the 2016 Sounders season; it was replaced in 2019 with a similar composition. The stadium received a new surface in 2024 that incorporated the FieldTurf CORE system.

There have been various opinions regarding both the artificial surface and temporary grass surfaces used for soccer matches. After the Brazilian national team defeated Canada's side 3–2 in 2008, Brazil's coach commented that one reason for his team's unexpectedly poor performance was the loosely installed grass field. The Grenada national team struggled to cope with the artificial surface during their loss at the 2009 CONCACAF Gold Cup. In July 2009, the U.S. Soccer Federation chose D.C. United's RFK Stadium over Qwest Field for the U.S. Open Cup. The general manager of D.C. United speculated that RFK's grass field was one of the reasons his team had a stronger bid. The general manager of the Sounders, Adrian Hanauer, told The Seattle Times in 2010 that replacement of the surface was a continuing conversation between the Sounders and Allen's Vulcan Inc. When the Los Angeles Galaxy traveled to Seattle in May 2012, the FieldTurf was noted as one of the reasons David Beckham and Robbie Keane were left out of the line-up. The field was the subject of further commentary in August 2014 after a corporate event left groundskeepers with little time to prepare the pitch before a Sounders match. In 2015, Sounders player Zach Scott expressed concerns over the same installation of the field and its effects on his body; the overall discourse influenced a 10-year lease extension between Sounders FC and First & Goal announced the same year with the inclusion of a mandate for installation of new turf every four years or sooner. Following the removal of Lumen Field's temporary grass surface, used during the 2026 FIFA World Cup, several Seahawks players also voiced their support for a grass field.

Between August and November, both the Seahawks, Sounders, and Reign host games at Lumen Field. Each team has emphasized the importance of playing their games without the other team's painted lines on the field. Around 2003, at the Seahawks' request, local company EcoChemical developed for the field a new kind of paint that is "designed to fail". The new paint is relatively easy to remove with a power washer and a special chemical solution, a process that the company describes as environmentally friendly. With the new paint, converting the field between American football and soccer takes 14 hours in dry weather, though painting logos and other colors takes additional time. Despite various preparations, some Sounders matches—particularly in the playoffs—have had Seahawks logos and American football lines painted on the turf.

== Football ==
=== Seahawks ===
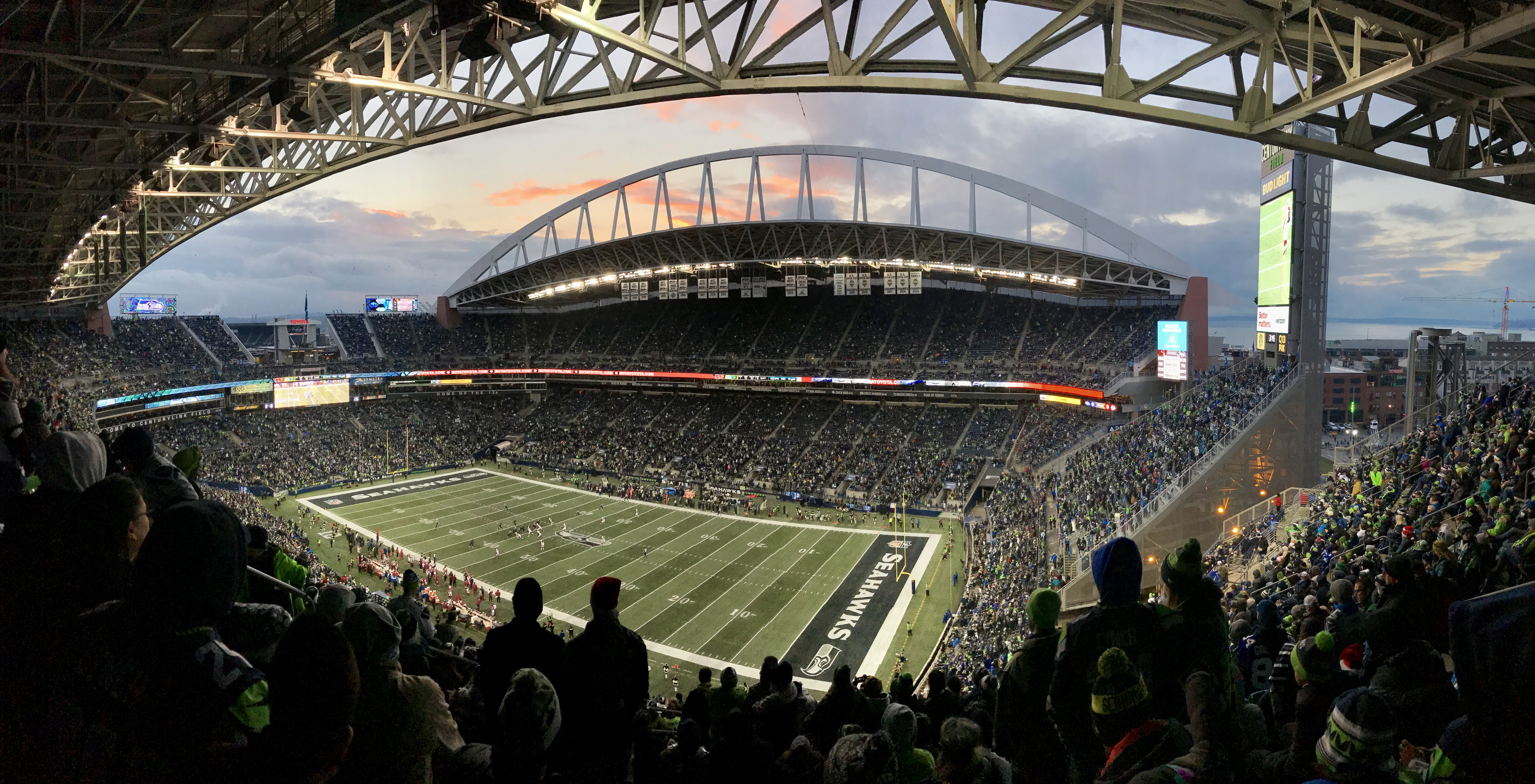
A regular season game for the Seahawks in 2016

Prior to the stadium opening in 2002, Allen and Bob Whitsitt said that they hoped the new stadium would help turn the Seahawks into a Super Bowl contender and that Seattle would be considered to host the championship game. The seating is expandable to 72,000 for the purpose of holding the game, but the NFL typically does not consider cities with outdoor stadiums where the average temperature in February is below 50 °F (10 °C). The team's first season at their new home was in 2002. (Note: 2002 also marked the Seahawks' first season in the National Football Conference (NFC) since their inaugural season in 1976; they were members of the American Football Conference (AFC) between 1977 and 2001.) Their first game at the new facility was a 28–10 preseason loss to the Indianapolis Colts on August 11, 2002. Their first regular-season game was held on September 15, 2002; the Seahawks lost by a score of 24–13 to the Arizona Cardinals, the same franchise that defeated them in the first regular-season game at the Kingdome in 1976.

Between 2002 and 2005, the Seahawks won 24 of their 32 regular season games at the stadium. This included two seasons without a defeat at home. Head coach Mike Holmgren, who left the organization after the 2008 season, commented that Qwest Field was "a remarkable place to compete in and to play professional football" and games there "an experience". Under Pete Carroll, the Seahawks were undefeated at home during the 2012 season. Season tickets for 2013 sold-out with a franchise-record 98% renewal rate. Through the 2018 season, the Seahawks compiled a regular season record of 95–41 at the stadium.

Lumen Field often sells out for Seahawks games; although the team struggled to sell out games (with two resulting blackouts) (Note: Under then-current NFL policy, a game that failed to sell out 72 hours prior to its start time would result in its blackout in the home team's television market. This policy was effectively suspended in 2015.) Since the 2003 home opener, the Seahawks have sold out every game at the stadium, with 146 consecutive games sold out through the 2019 season. (Note: All Seahawks home games during the 2020 season were played without spectators due to the COVID-19 pandemic in Seattle.) The number of season tickets available was capped at 61,000 following the Super Bowl XL appearance in 2006; the ensuing waiting list was the first for the Seahawks since the early 1990s. Despite dismal on-field performances in 2008 and 2009, the team maintained its base of season ticket holders; Before the 2008 season, the 14,000 single game tickets not already allotted sold out less than 15 minutes after they became available. After going 9–23 over two seasons in 2008 and 2009, the number of available season tickets was increased to 62,000. The largest crowd to attend a Seahawks game at Lumen Field was 69,190, against the Philadelphia Eagles on November 20, 2016. In 2024, the Seahawks sold 663,500 tickets at Lumen Field with an average general admission cost of $143 each. The Seahawks have a 30-year lease with the Washington State Public Stadium Authority that is set to expire in 2032.

==== Home field advantage ====
Lumen Field has earned a reputation as one of the loudest stadiums in the NFL. It was, at one point in time, in the Guinness World Record books for being the loudest stadium in the world. The seating decks and partial roof, both trap and amplify exceptional amounts of noise and reflect it back onto the field. This noise possibly contributes to increased false start penalties since opposing offenses can miss audibles and the snap count, as well as delay of game penalties due to the reduced efficiency of communicating plays to the offense. From 2002 through 2012, there have been 143 false-start penalties on visiting teams in Seattle, second only to the Minnesota Vikings. During that same time period, the Seahawks have accumulated a home win record of 59–29, with a simultaneous road record of 33–55.

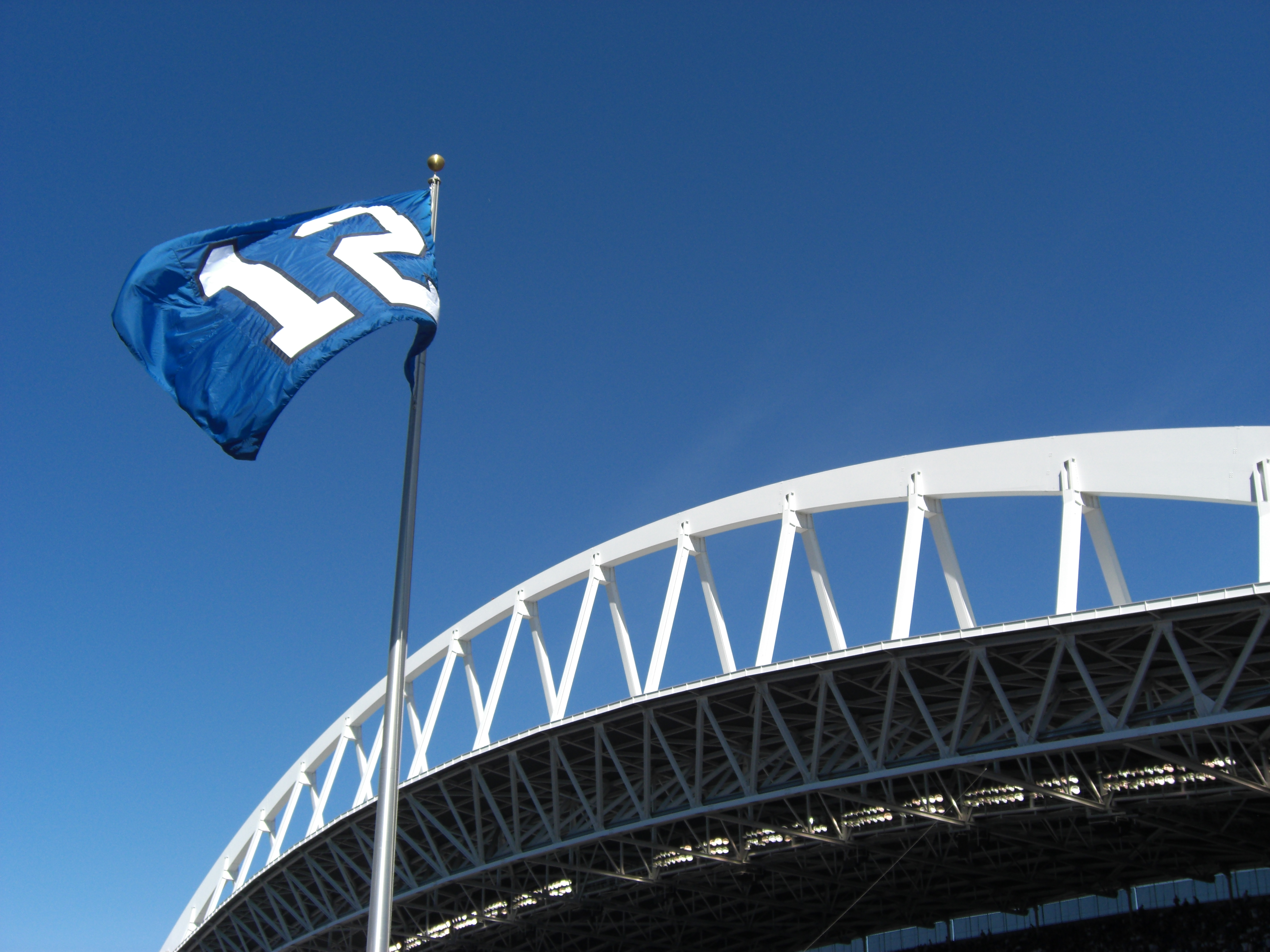
The 12th Man flag and a portion of the roof's support truss

When Tod Leiweke was hired as the Seahawks' new CEO in 2003, he had a large flagpole installed in the south end to fly the 12th Man Flag as a tribute to the team's fans, collectively known as the 12th man. (Note: As of 2014, the Seahawks refer to their fans as the "12s" due to licensing restrictions from Texas A&M University, which holds the rights to the "12th Man" trademark.) The team had retired the number 12 in 1984 to honor its fans, who had gained notoriety for intensifying the Kingdome's noisy acoustics such that the NFL enacted a rule in 1989 penalizing home teams for disruptive crowd noise when visiting teams are on offense; the rule itself is rarely enforced due to the futility of controlling such noise leaguewide. A local celebrity, sometimes a former Seahawk, raises the flag during the network television pre-game events.

In 2005, the stadium gained national attention when the visiting New York Giants committed 11 false start penalties. Seahawks head coach Mike Holmgren attributed the penalties to the enthusiasm and noise from the crowd. He dedicated the ball used to make the game-winning field goal to the fans, and it is now displayed at the stadium. The Giants' general manager, Ernie Accorsi, asked an NFL senior vice president whether the Seahawks had broadcast artificial crowd noise over the public address system during this game. The NFL sent a memorandum early in the 2006 season about such complaints and sent officials to monitor two games. Holmgren denied the allegations, and the crowd responded by being even louder than usual when the Giants returned to Qwest Field. Since 2005 the Seahawks have tracked the number of false starts committed by visiting teams and display the statistic on a scoreboard to motivate the crowd. As of 2013, the stadium has had a league-high number of false starts since. In preparation for the 2005 NFC Championship Game at Qwest Field, the Carolina Panthers practiced with the recorded sounds of jet engines in the background to prepare for the volume of the crowd.

Kickers experience further disadvantages when attempting field goals at Lumen Field. Both the stadium's proximity to Puget Sound and the open north end create winds that are challenging to gauge. Former Seahawks kicker Josh Brown adjusted to the winds, and he believed the moisture in the air caused trouble for others.

On September 15, 2013, Seattle Seahawks fans successfully broke the Guinness World Record for the loudest stadium in the world. The 131.9-decibel record occurred during the sack of San Francisco 49ers quarterback Colin Kaepernick in the first quarter. Fans then broke their new record during the third quarter of the same game when a level of 136.6 decibels was achieved during a goal line stand by the Seahawks defense. The record was broken by the crowd at Arrowhead Stadium on October 13, 2013, with a sound pressure level of 137.57 decibels. The record was later regained by the Seahawks fans on December 2, 2013, with 137.6 decibels against the New Orleans Saints, but lost once again to Arrowhead Stadium in a Monday Night Football game between the Kansas City Chiefs and New England Patriots on September 29, 2014, setting the record that still stands at 142.2 decibels.

=== XFL ===
The Seattle Dragons of the XFL played their only two home games at CenturyLink Field during the short-lived league's 2020 season. The team was among seven in the XFL to share its stadium with NFL teams and drew a league-record 29,172 fans at the home opener on February 15, 2020. The second game had 22,060 in attendance, with the team among the highest-drawing in the XFL before the league suspended operations in the wake of the COVID-19 pandemic. The team resumed play in 2023 at Lumen Field as the Sea Dragons, holding their first home game on February 23. The Sea Dragons played their last game at the stadium on April 23, clinching a playoff berth with a 28–9 victory over the Vegas Vipers; the team did not survive the XFL's merger with the United States Football League to form the United Football League the following year.

=== College ===
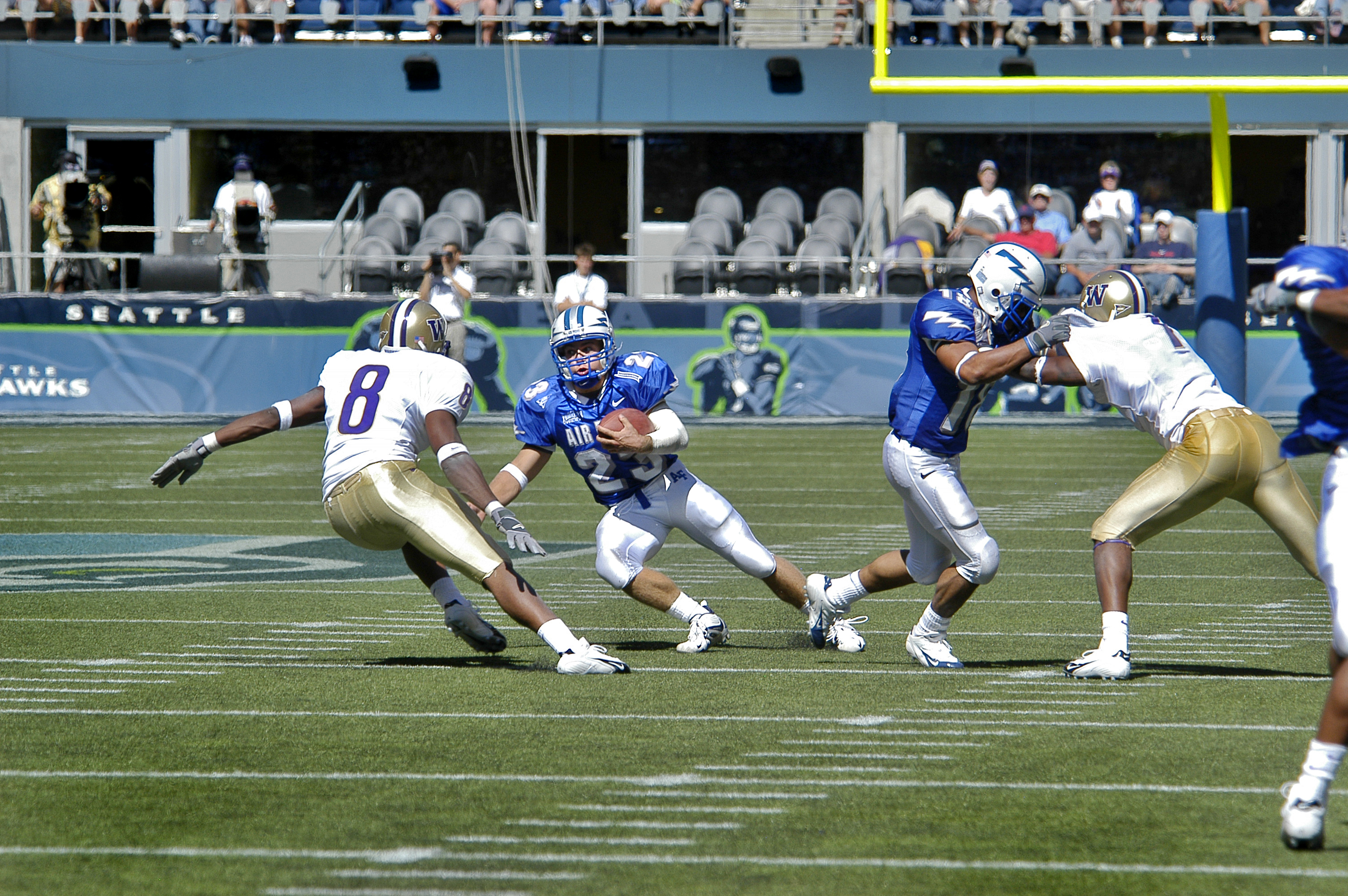
Washington hosting Air Force in 2005

Lumen Field has hosted several college football games. The hometown Washington Huskies played their 2005 season opener against the Air Force Falcons at the stadium in Tyrone Willingham's first game as head coach. The Huskies played their entire 2012 home schedule at the stadium while their home field, Husky Stadium, underwent a $250 million renovation; to expedite the start of the renovation by three weeks, the Huskies and the Washington State Cougars also played the Apple Cup in 2011 at then-CenturyLink Field. The stadium hosted its second Apple Cup in September 2024 after the Huskies moved to the Big Ten Conference and agreed to a five-year Apple Cup schedule with the Cougars.

From 2002 through 2014, the stadium hosted a Washington State Cougars' non-conference home game each season (except for 2010). This included the 86th "Battle of the Palouse" against the Idaho Vandals in 2003. The attendance for the dozen Cougar games ranged from 30,927 to 63,588. CenturyLink Field is approximately 300 miles (480 km) from WSU, but closer to many alumni in the Seattle metro area. The university's athletic director said that an attendance of 50,000 was needed to make it worth moving the game from Martin Stadium in Pullman. The Cougars went 6–6 in their annual Seattle home game, which generated additional revenue that was invested in facilities for the football program while also increasing exposure to the western side of the state.

In April 2009, it was proposed that the annual Apple Cup between the Seattle-based Huskies and the Pullman-based Cougars be hosted at CenturyLink Field for six years beginning in 2010. The two programs could not reach an agreement on how to divide tickets. Pullman's business community had expressed concerns that playing the game away from the Palouse would be detrimental to the local economy.

Qwest Field hosted the second and final Seattle Bowl in late 2002, in which Wake Forest beat Oregon 38–17. The inaugural Seattle Bowl was played a year earlier at Safeco Field, but the game was discontinued when organizers could not secure financing before 2003. Later attempts to revive the Seattle Bowl were unsuccessful. The Seattle Sports Commission led a push in 2008 for a new bowl game starting in 2010 that would have been a fundraiser for Seattle Children's Hospital.

Lower division NCAA teams have played at the stadium throughout the years. From 2003 to 2008, the Division II football teams from Western Washington University and Central Washington University met each year in a rivalry game called "The Battle in Seattle." Central won all but the 2004 game, and each meeting attracted more than 11,000. Western (of Bellingham) discontinued its football program after the 2008 season, but Central (of Ellensburg) agreed to continue the series with Western Oregon University (of Monmouth) for games in 2009 and 2010. "Battle in Seattle VII" saw Central make a comeback to win 23–21 in front of 5,374.

On October 31, 2009, the Division I FCS Eastern Washington University Eagles played a home game in Seattle for the first time. Along with the goal of drawing alumni from the metropolitan area, the athletic directors from both Eastern Washington (of Cheney) and Washington State had expressed the importance of connecting with alumni at receptions and other events on the western side of the state. Billed as the "Showdown on the Sound", the game was a 47–10 victory over the Portland State Vikings. According to Eastern's athletic director, Qwest Field's rental was $50,000 for the day. The stadium subsequently hosted a game on September 11, 2010, between Eastern and Central; coined the "Battle of the Sound", the game saw Eastern prevail over Central 35–32.

=== High school ===
Lumen Field has been used for high school football. The Washington Interscholastic Activities Association (WIAA) puts on the annual Emerald City Kickoff Classic at the stadium. The event is a season-opening series of games between some of the best teams in the state. The WIAA approached the Seahawks regarding use of the stadium for their high school football state championship games after moving them out of the Tacoma Dome in 2019, but the latter declined and recommended using Husky Stadium instead, noting that they were unable to match the offer terms from UW's athletic department.

The stadium features a meeting between one of the best teams in Washington and one of the best from another state in the "Best of the West" game. On September 4, 2004, Washington's Bellevue High School and California's De La Salle High School played in front of over 25,000, a state high school event attendance record. Bellevue ended De La Salle's national-record 151-game winning streak in a 39–20 win. On September 16, 2009, Bellevue defeated another highly regarded California school at Qwest Field in a 30–16 victory over Long Beach Polytechnic. USA Today had recently rated both teams highly with Long Beach third and Bellevue at 16th in the nation.

After the organizer of the event announced a match-up between Washington's Skyline High School and Oregon's Jesuit High School in 2009, he said that he proposed the possibility of televising games to Fox Sports, but Fox did not televise the game. Skyline went on to shut out Jesuit 17–0 during that year's Emerald City Classic.

Within Lumen Field, a large art piece called The State of Football pays tribute to high school football in the state of Washington. The piece features a depiction of Washington and holds replica football helmets from every high school football team in the state. The installation is part of the Stadium Art Program commissioned through First & Goal's lease of the facility, costing nearly $1.75 million.

== Soccer ==
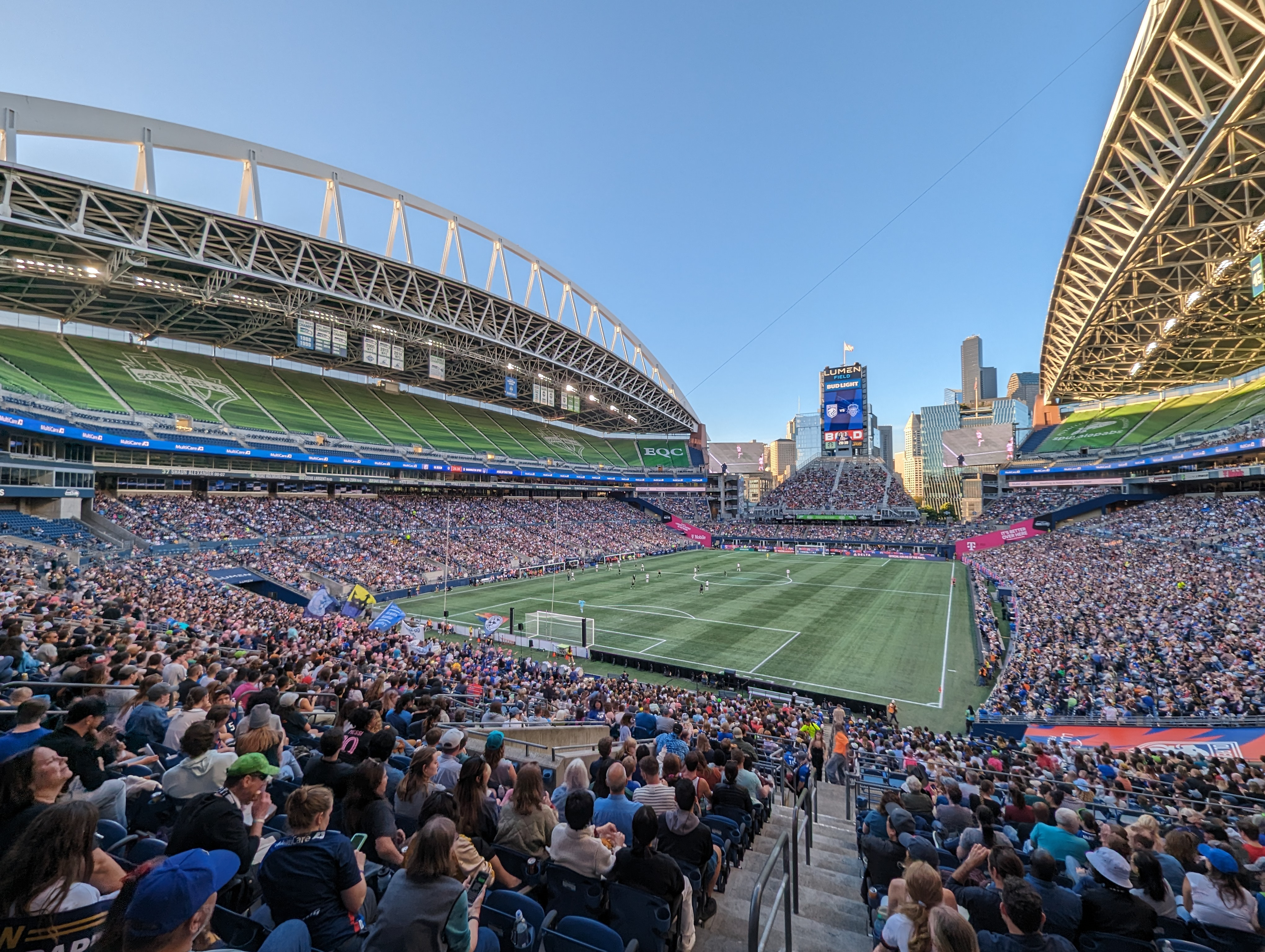
The stadium with its upper tier covered during an OL Reign match in 2023

Lumen Field is also designed for soccer. The stadium meets FIFA sight line requirements and provides separate locker rooms for soccer teams. Camera locations were chosen for optimal television coverage of the sport. Numerous exhibition games have taken place at Lumen Field, including high-profile clubs such as Manchester United, Barcelona, Celtic, Real Madrid, Chelsea, Club América, and Chivas de Guadalajara. These games have proved to be highly popular, and the first sell-out of 66,772 fans at the stadium was a soccer match between Manchester United and Celtic. National teams such as Brazil, Venezuela, Mexico, and China have played exhibition games at the stadium. The artificial turf has been temporarily overlaid with grass for international matches.

Seattle was the site of the 2005 CONCACAF Gold Cup Group B opening round between the national teams of the United States, Costa Rica, Canada, and Cuba. Two matches of the 2009 CONCACAF Gold Cup opening round were also played at the stadium on July 4, 2009. In the second match, the United States comfortably defeated Grenada, who were playing in their first major international competition, 4–0. The Gold Cup returned in 2013 with Panama beating Martinique and Mexico defeating Canada in opening group play matches. CenturyLink Field also hosted three matches during the 2016 Copa América Centenario, a special inter-continental tournament, including two group stage fixtures and a quarterfinal match between the United States and Ecuador attended by 47,322 spectators.

On November 22, 2009, Seattle was the site of the 14th annual MLS Cup between Real Salt Lake and the Los Angeles Galaxy, where Salt Lake won the Cup on penalty kicks (5–4) in front of 46,011. The stadium was the eighth venue to host the event and had the fourth-largest attendance for an MLS Cup. The MLS Cup returned to Seattle in 2019, with the Sounders hosting Toronto FC as the team with the better regular season record. The Sounders won in front of 69,274 spectators, setting a new record for a sporting event at Lumen Field and recording the second-highest cup attendance in league history.

=== Sounders (USL) ===
The first sporting event at the stadium was a double-header on July 28, 2002, that included both the Sounders Select Women and the men's Seattle Sounders of the USL team. The women defeated the Vancouver Breakers 4–3, while the men beat the Vancouver Whitecaps 4–1 in front of 25,515 people. The USL team began using the facility regularly as their home field in 2003. Although team management was concerned with the high rent and the underused seating capacity, they were drawn by the sponsorship opportunities and location. The Sounders increased their average attendance from 2,583 at Seattle's Memorial Stadium in 2002 to 3,452 at the new stadium in 2003. In 2005, the Sounders beat the Richmond Kickers 2–1 in a penalty shootout for the USL championship in front of 8,011. Scott Jenkins scored the final goal and announced his retirement after the game.

In 2008, the MLS expansion franchise Sounders FC decided to develop the Starfire Sports Complex in nearby Tukwila, and the USL team played most of the season at that facility. At the time, team management thought that practicing and playing at Starfire could provide a better transition for those hoping to play for the new MLS team. The last match for the USL Sounders at Qwest Field was the 2008 season opener against the rival Portland Timbers. The game ended in a scoreless draw in front of 10,184.

=== Sounders FC ===
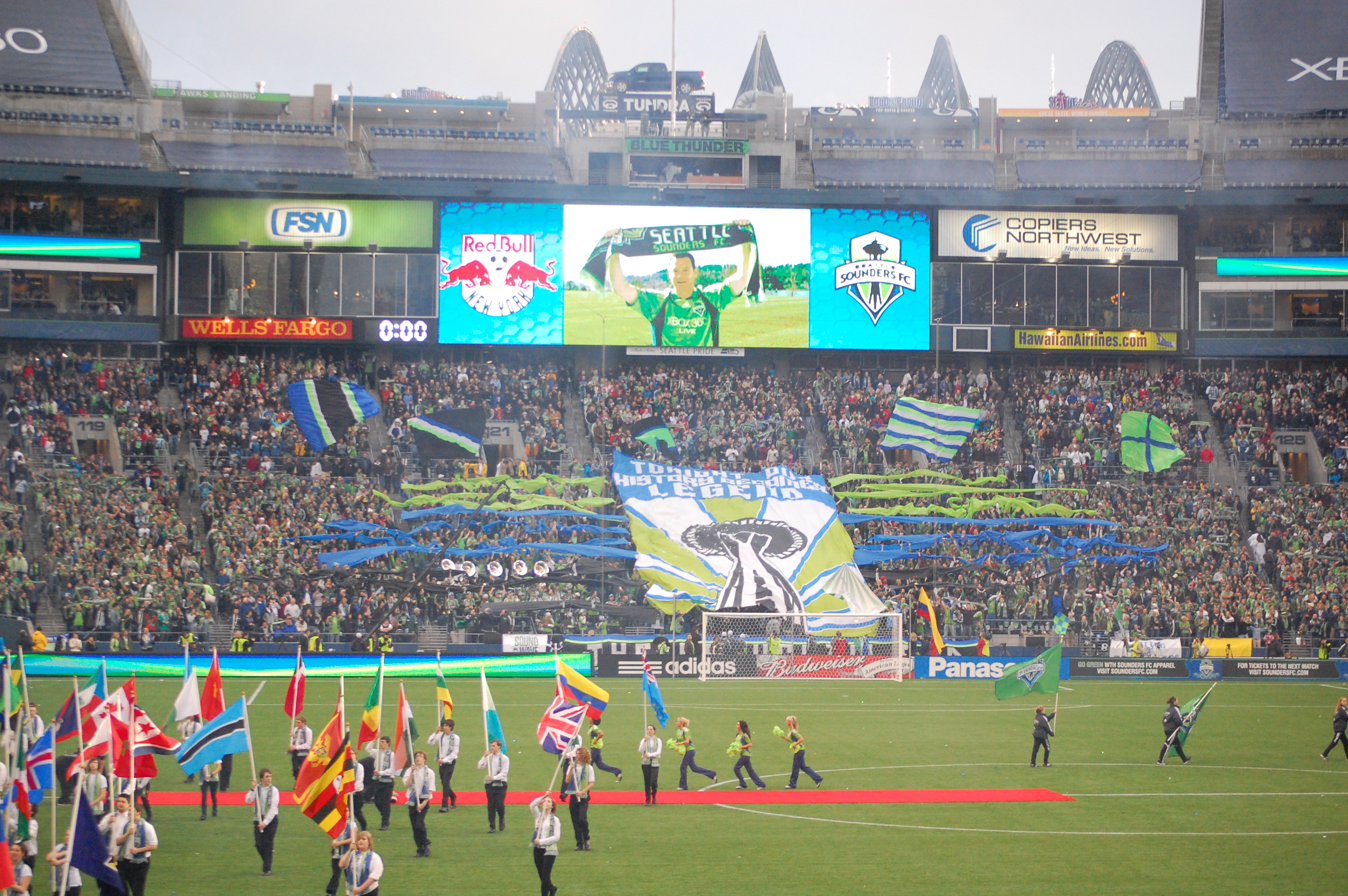
The south end of the stadium before the Sounders FC inaugural match

The potential to draw an MLS expansion team helped drive public support for building the stadium in 1997. In 1996, Seattle was considered for one of the 10 original MLS teams; however, the region lacked an adequate outdoor stadium. In 2007, it was announced that Seattle would be the home of an expansion team. The first Sounders FC regular season match was at the stadium on March 19, 2009. Fredy Montero scored the first goal in a 3–0 Seattle victory.

Before the opening of their first season, the Sounders already had the highest number of season ticket holders in the MLS after they sold all 22,000 of the offered season ticket packages. The team created a web site that was used to identify seating arrangements for season ticket holders based on personal interests including preferred method for watching a game and foreign team preference. For the first half of the inaugural season, the upper and lower sections were tarped off, limiting the seating capacity to 27,700. The club hoped to create an intimate environment as well as a supply-and-demand factor that would reward season ticket holders and encourage early purchase of seats. The stadium has continuously sold out league matches in the limited seating configuration. However, majority owner Joe Roth has said that he "won't be happy" until the entire venue is open.

The stadium was designed to easily open seating sections in stages if needed. After repeated sellout crowds, additional sections were opened, increasing total capacity to 32,400. In the Sounders' first year they set an MLS record with an average home attendance of 30,943 people. Official capacity was increased to 35,700 after the 2009 season. In 2011, The Sounders continued to hold the highest average attendance in the league with 38,496. Official capacity was increased again to 38,500 with the opening of the Hawk's Nest for the 2012 season. The team averaged 44,247 spectators in the 2015 MLS season, its all-time record. As of 2019, the regular season MLS capacity at Lumen Field is listed as 37,722 seats, with four matches scheduled to use larger sections of the stadium.

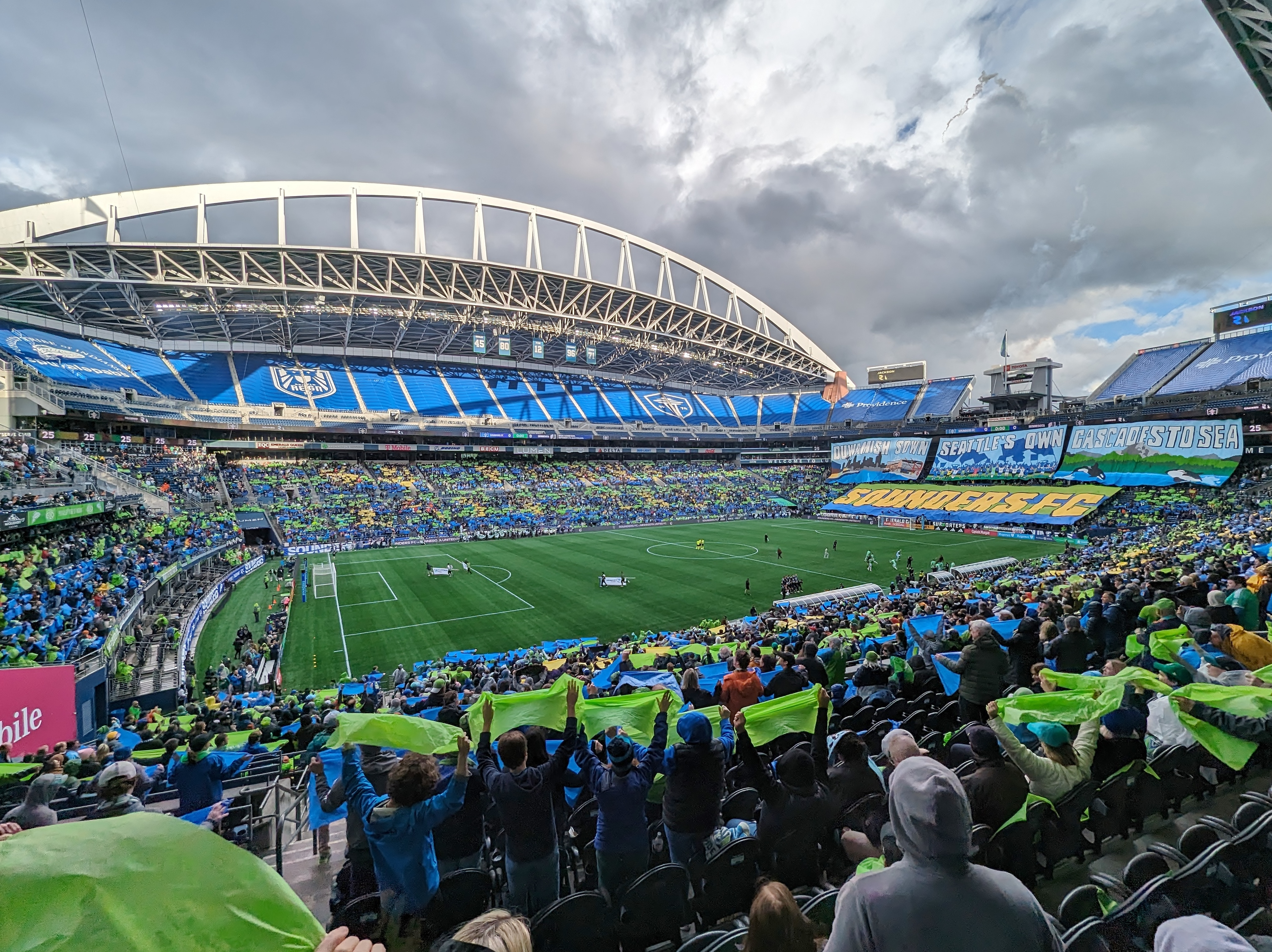
A regular season match for the Sounders in 2024, seen prior to kick-off

The Sounders set the state's single game soccer attendance record when they hosted Manchester United in front of 67,052 in July 2011. On October 15, 2011, additional seats were available for a record crowd of 64,140 during the final regular season home match, a Sounders 2–1 win followed by ceremonies honoring retiring goalkeeper Kasey Keller. And on October 7, 2012, another attendance record was broken when 66,452 fans were present for a 3–0 win over the Portland Timbers, following a ceremony awarding retired Forward Roger Levesque a Golden Scarf. The Sounders hosted MLS Cup 2019 and set an attendance record for sporting events at the stadium of 69,274 as they won their second league championship.

CenturyLink Field has hosted two U.S. Open Cup tournament finals. On October 5, 2010, the tournament's 81-year-old attendance record was broken when the Sounders defeated the Columbus Crew 2–1 in front of 31,311. That record was broken one year later when CenturyLink Field again hosted the final on October 4, 2011, as 36,615 spectators watched Seattle defeat the Chicago Fire 2–0. The stadium has also hosted a CONCACAF Champions League tournament final; on May 4, 2022, the Sounders defeated Pumas UNAM 3–0 in the second leg of the final before a tournament-record crowd of 68,741 to win 5–2 on aggregate, becoming the first MLS team to win the tournament under its current format.

Like the Seahawks, the Sounders have received attention for sellout crowds and boisterous fans. The Seattle Times reported that a "new standard for attendance and game-day atmosphere has been set" due to the loud sellout crowds. The passionate Emerald City Supporters have dubbed the general admission sections behind the south goal the "Brougham End" for the street that runs along the south edge of the complex.

=== Seattle Reign FC ===
Seattle Reign FC played against Portland Thorns FC at the stadium on August 29, 2021, as part of a doubleheader with the Sounders and Timbers. The Reign defeated the Thorns 2–1 in front of 27,248, breaking the then NWSL's attendance record. The Reign later announced on December 15 that they would move into the stadium for the 2022 season, leaving their previous home, Cheney Stadium in Tacoma, as plans to build a soccer-specific stadium in the city stalled amid the COVID-19 pandemic. The stadium's capacity is reduced to 10,000 seats for most Seattle Reign home matches. A new NWSL attendance record of 34,130 was set on October 6, 2023, by the Reign for Megan Rapinoe's final home match.

=== 2025 FIFA Club World Cup ===
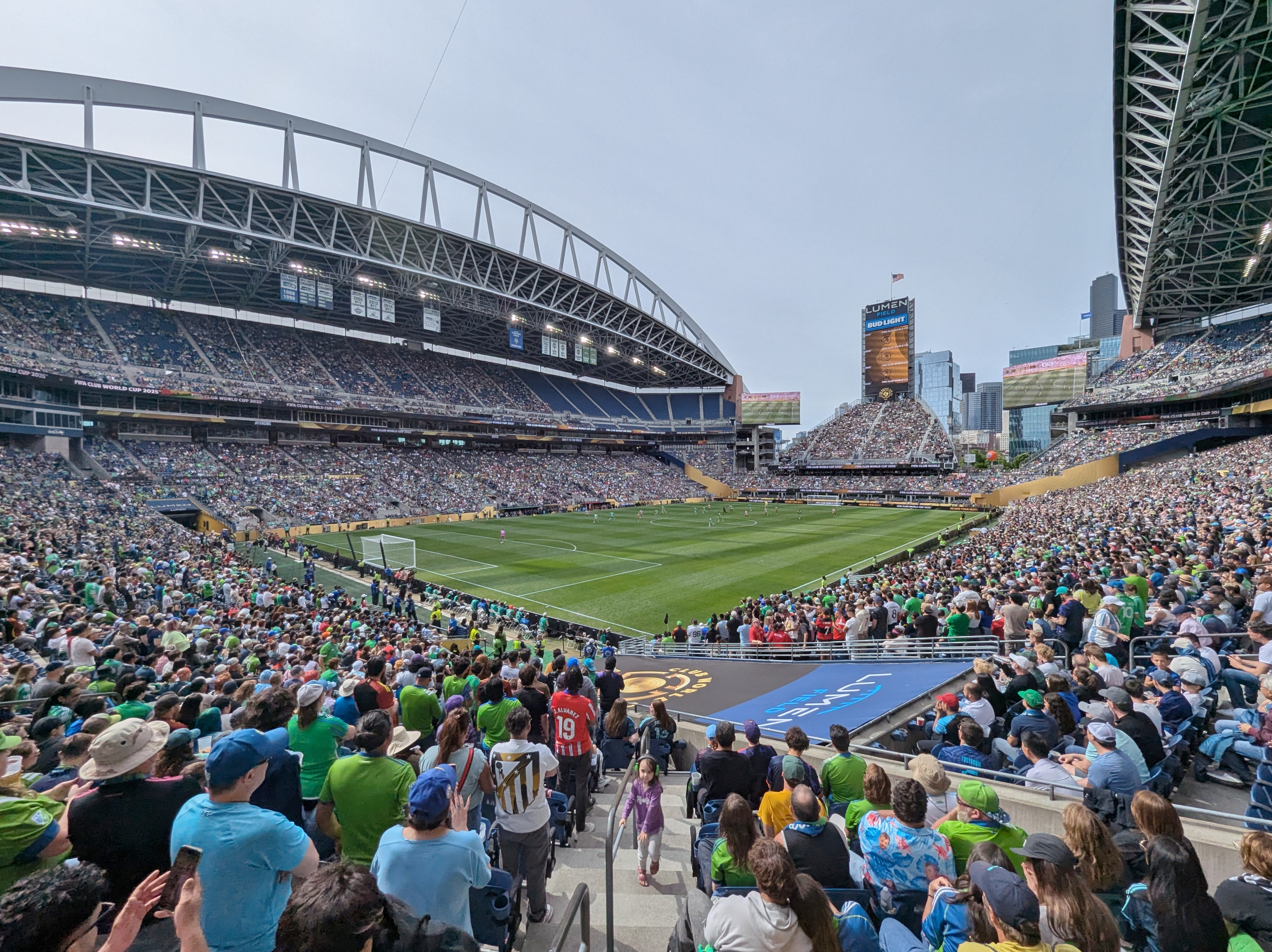
Lumen Field during the 2025 FIFA Club World Cup.

Lumen Field hosted six matches during the 2025 FIFA Club World Cup, including all three Group B matches for the Sounders and three from Group E. The tournament was also served to prepare the stadium and city for the World Cup the following year. A temporary hybrid grass surface, developed by an Australian company and grown in Moses Lake, Washington, was installed over the artificial turf for the tournament. The grass surface was later criticized by Paris Saint-Germain manager Luis Enrique as being too bouncy and dry. The matches also included related events in Pioneer Square and the International District, as well as special Sounder commuter train service and increased Link light rail trains. The six matches drew an attendance of over 210,000 total spectators, with crowds of over 50,000 at two Sounders matches against Atlético Madrid and Paris Saint-Germain. The smallest crowd, of under 12,000, was for a match between River Plate and Urawa Red Diamonds.

=== 2026 FIFA World Cup ===
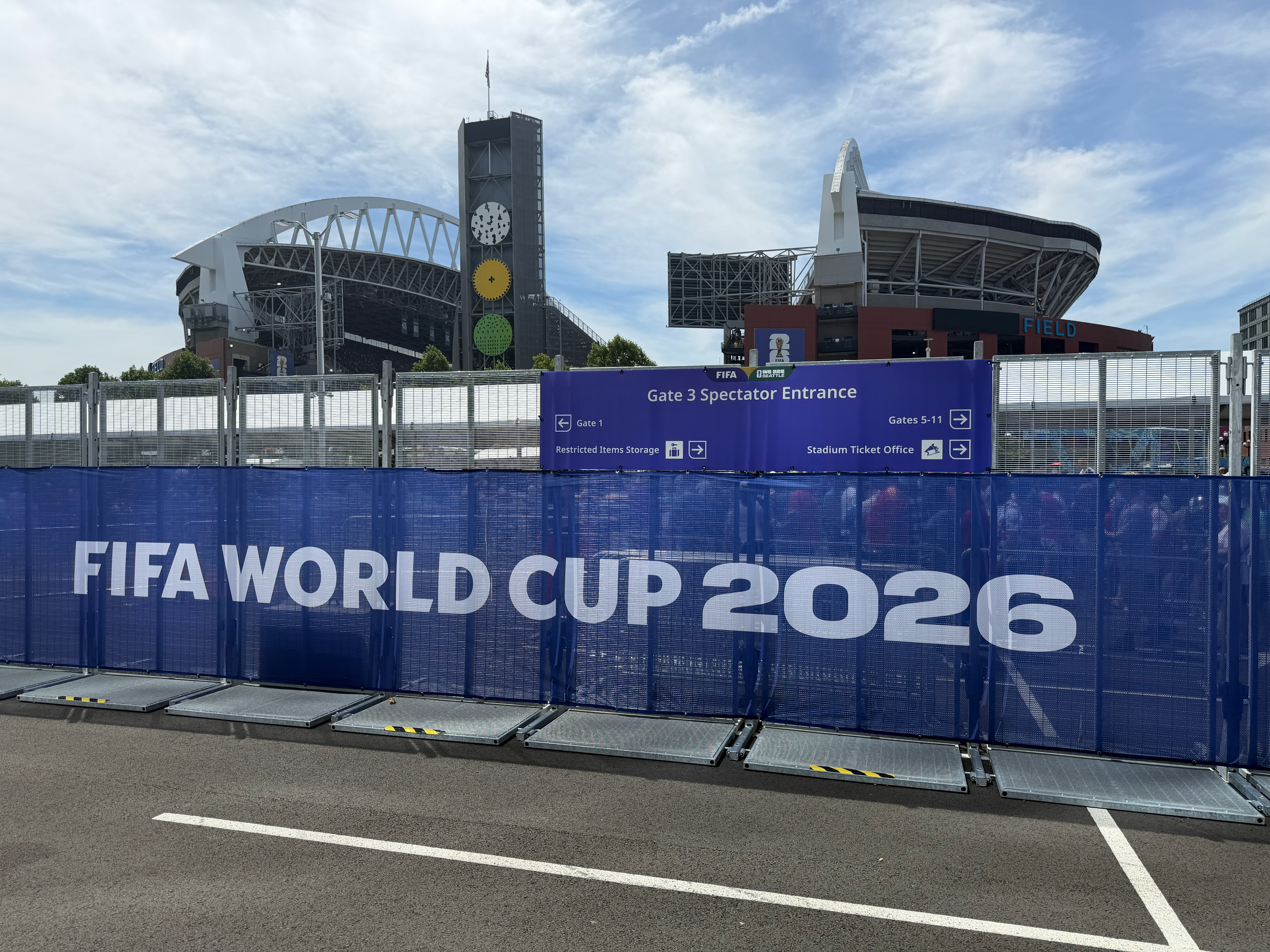
"Seattle Stadium" with Lumen branding covered for the 2026 FIFA World Cup.

Lumen Field was one of sixteen venues that hosted matches during the 2026 FIFA World Cup, which was played in Canada, Mexico, and the United States. The stadium hosted four matches during the group stage and two matches in the knockout stage. It was one of two Pacific Northwest venues hosting the event, together with BC Place in Vancouver. Lumen Field hosted two matches from Group G, one match from Group B, and one match from Group D that featured the United States. The stadium's design and atmosphere, particularly during the United States matches, were praised by international visitors and media outlets.

Seattle had two venues—Lumen Field and Husky Stadium—among 58 facilities previously considered in the unsuccessful United States bid for the 2022 FIFA World Cup. When discussing Seattle as a candidate, Sunil Gulati of the U.S. Soccer Federation called Lumen Field (then Qwest Field) "a world-class facility". Seattle finally hosted a World Cup qualifier on June 11, 2013; the qualifier, which was the city's second overall and the first since 1976, saw the United States defeat Panama 2–0 in front of a raucous crowd of 40,847. The combined Canada–Mexico–United States bid won the right to host the 2026 FIFA World Cup following a 2018 vote by FIFA; Lumen Field was one of the 23 finalist venues named by the organizing committee.

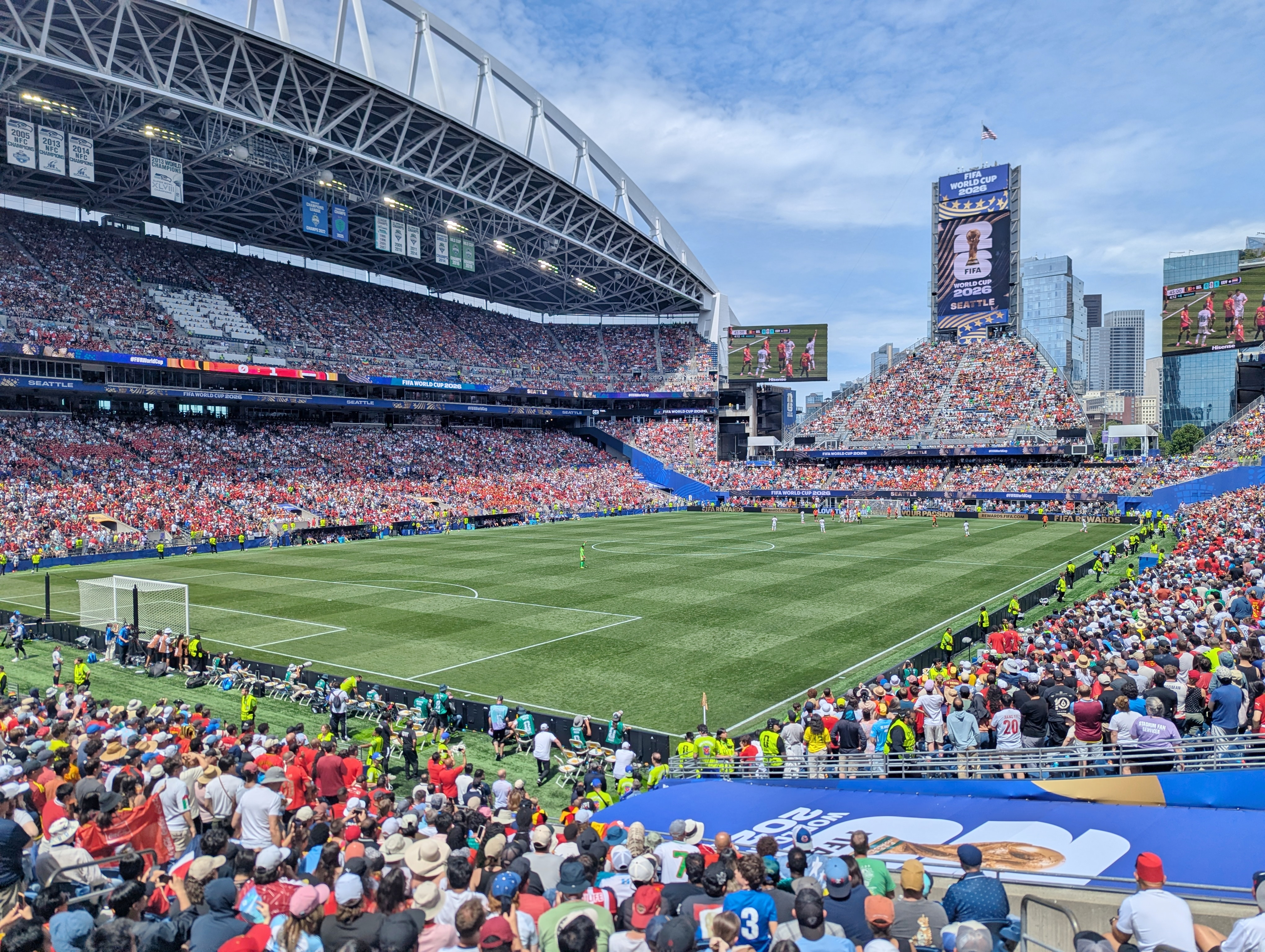
Lumen Field during the group stage match between Belgium and Egypt.

Lumen Field was subsequently announced in June 2022 as one of the 11 American venues, as well as one of five current MLS venues selected to host matches. Under preliminary plans by the city government, it would cost up to $10.5 million to host the World Cup matches, including installation of a temporary grass surface, policing the venue and practice fields, and managing a fan festival at the Seattle Center or on the city's waterfront. A revised estimate of $29.4 million was announced in 2025 with $19.4 million allocated by the state government to fund the installation of the temporary grass surface after the conclusion of the 2025 NFL season. The bleacher seats in the Hawks Nest were also replaced by permanent seats ahead of the tournament. The grass surface, laid on top of the existing turf and 12 to 14 inches (30 to 36 cm) of sand and other materials, was first used for a United States women's team friendly in April and received favorable reviews.

During the World Cup, the stadium was temporarily renamed to "Seattle Stadium" in accordance with FIFA's policy on corporate sponsored names. Work to cover the existing Lumen Field signage began in late May alongside the installation of security fencing in the north parking lot; other advertisements for sponsors were temporarily covered or removed, including the 305-foot (93 m) letters painted on the roof. The signage for Lumen Field was restored in early July and the grass surface is scheduled to be removed in August. The Seattle local organizing committee designated two themed matches—Juneteenth on June 19 and Pride on June 26—prior to the tournament draw. The Pride Match was played ahead of the Seattle Pride weekend by Egypt and Iran, which both announced objections to the label through their respective national associations. During the Juneteenth match, the stadium's seismometers registered a peak acceleration of 3.3 mm/s^{2} (0.13 in/s^{2}) after a United States goal was scored by Alex Freeman.

=== 2031 FIFA Women's World Cup ===
In November 2025, Lumen Field was named one of 14 candidate venues in the United States for the 2031 FIFA Women's World Cup. The lone bid for the tournament had been submitted by the United States, Mexico, Costa Rica, and Jamaica. Lumen Field has been proposed as a venue for the semifinals round based on previous soccer events at the stadium, particularly the 2026 men's World Cup.

== Other events ==
The stadium became a yearly site for Supercross races in 2005. Seattle had been left out of the circuit since the Kingdome hosted the race in 1999. It takes more than 650 truckloads of dirt to build the course for the event that around 50,000 spectators attend. In May 2004, Qwest Field hosted the first Major League Lacrosse game played outside the East Coast; it hosted a second game the following year. The stadium has also been used for public speaking engagements. For example, the 14th Dalai Lama of Tibet, Tenzin Gyatso, delivered a 28-minute speech to 50,817 people on April 12, 2008.

The largest concert attendance in the stadium's history was set on July 22, 2023, by Taylor Swift's The Eras Tour; 72,171 spectators watched at Lumen Field on the first of two days. The record was surpassed a month later by Ed Sheeran's The Mathematics Tour, which drew 77,286 to Lumen Field on August 26.

Lumen Field hosted several events related to the 2023 MLB All-Star Game, which was played at the adjacent T-Mobile Park. The first two rounds of the Major League Baseball draft took place at Lumen Field on July 9. The playing surface was divided into several pitching areas while the north lot and event center include performance stages, batting cages, and museum exhibits.

=== Event Center ===
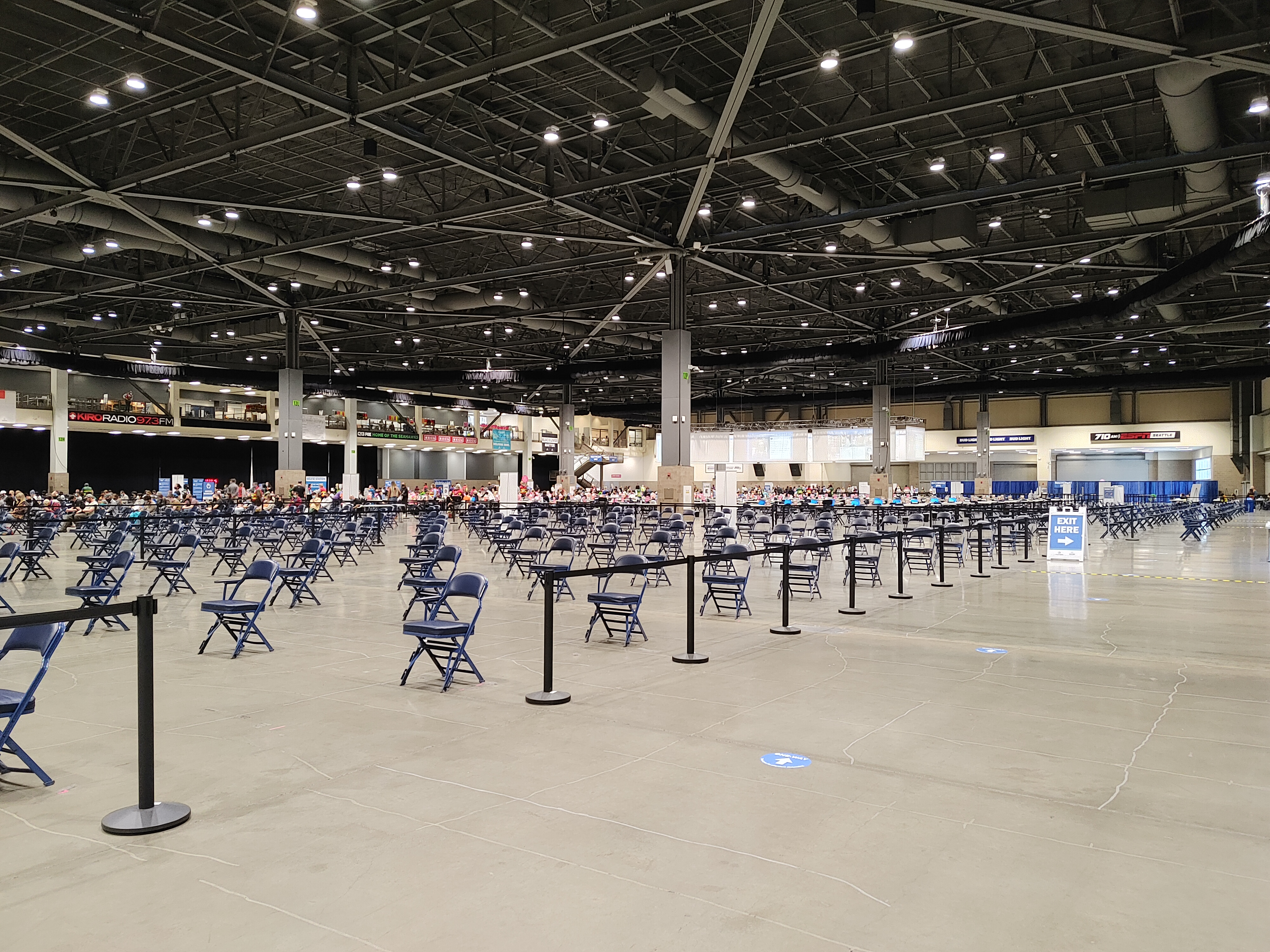
Main exhibition hall at the Event Center during a Moderna COVID-19 vaccination session in April 2021

The Lumen Field Event Center connects to the stadium's west field plaza and consists of two exhibition halls, a conference room, and a concourse. The center hosts pre-game events for the Seahawks and Mariners. According to the Public Stadium Authority's website, the event center contributes more than half a billion dollars to the region's economy. Originally debuting as the Washington State Stadium Exhibition Center, the center became known as the Seahawks Exhibition Center upon the stadium's opening in 2002. The center was renamed the Qwest Field Event Center in 2004 after Qwest acquired naming rights to the complex; it retained the "Event Center" name in subsequent renamings of the complex.

The Event Center had previously been called "the worst venue in town" for concerts, but in 2006, AEG Live and First & Goal formed a partnership to create a new theater within the Event Center space. Washington Mutual (WaMu) obtained the naming rights to the new theater in a 10-year deal, calling it the WaMu Theater. The theater space can be assembled on an as-needed basis within the building and equipment, including the 104-foot (32 m) wide stage, can be dismantled and stored in the stadium. The theater's acoustics were improved by installing panels on the ceiling and a large curtain. Depending on the seating configuration, the capacity can be 3,300, 4,000, or 7,000. Seal performed the inaugural concert on November 6, 2006. Though the naming rights deal was terminated following the bankruptcy of Washington Mutual during the 2008 financial crisis, the theater retained the WaMu name, with AEG intending to seek a new sponsor for it; the meaning of the WaMu abbreviation was subsequently altered to represent "Washington Music" instead.

During the early weeks of the COVID-19 pandemic, the Event Center was contracted for use as a field hospital. The temporary hospital was erected in April 2020 with 250 beds under the management of the Federal Emergency Management Agency and Army Corps of Engineers. On April 8, the state government announced that the field hospital would be dismantled and relocated to another state by the federal government, as the pandemic's spread in Washington had slowed. In March 2021, the Event Center was converted into a mass vaccination center with capacity for 4,000 to 5,000 doses per week administered by the city government in partnership with First & Goal and Swedish Health Services. The Event Center was also used as a vote center during the 2020 and 2022 elections by King County.

== Seismic experiments ==
During a Seahawks football game on January 8, 2011, the Pacific Northwest Seismic Network (PNSN) recorded what was dubbed a "Beast Quake", for Marshawn "Beast Mode" Lynch, a player whose performance on one running play excited the Qwest Field stadium crowd enough for the resultant shaking to be recorded on PNSN instruments. Additional sensors were added in and around the stadium during the Seahawks' home playoff games in 2014, 2015, and 2017; motivations for the experiment included conducting a quick-reaction exercise for the seismometer network team to install sensors and interpret results, and to test the ability to handle increased web traffic from interested visitors from the general public. Notable shaking instances from crowd reactions captured during those games include The Tip in 2014, Kam Chancellor's 90–yard pick-six during a 2015 divisional round game, and some Seahawks scoring plays during the 2014 NFC Championship Game. PNSN collaborated with the Seahawks to set up sensors around the stadium again during the latter's playoff run in 2026, notably capturing Rashid Shaheed's 95-yard opening kickoff return touchdown in the divisional round and several pivotal plays during the 2025 NFC Championship Game.

PNSN has also recorded seismic activity from Sounders fans; multiple earthquakes were recorded on November 10, 2019, during the MLS Cup final between the Sounders and Toronto FC. Further "RaveQuakes" were recorded on May 4, 2022, during the second leg of the CONCACAF Champions League Final between the Sounders and Pumas UNAM. During two Taylor Swift concerts for The Eras Tour in July 2023, PSNS recorded a maximum ground acceleration of 11 mm/s^{2} (0.43 in/s^{2}) with peaks similar to a magnitude 2.3 earthquake. The readings were attributed to fan noise and dancing as well as the sound system used for the concerts.

== Facility contracts and naming rights ==
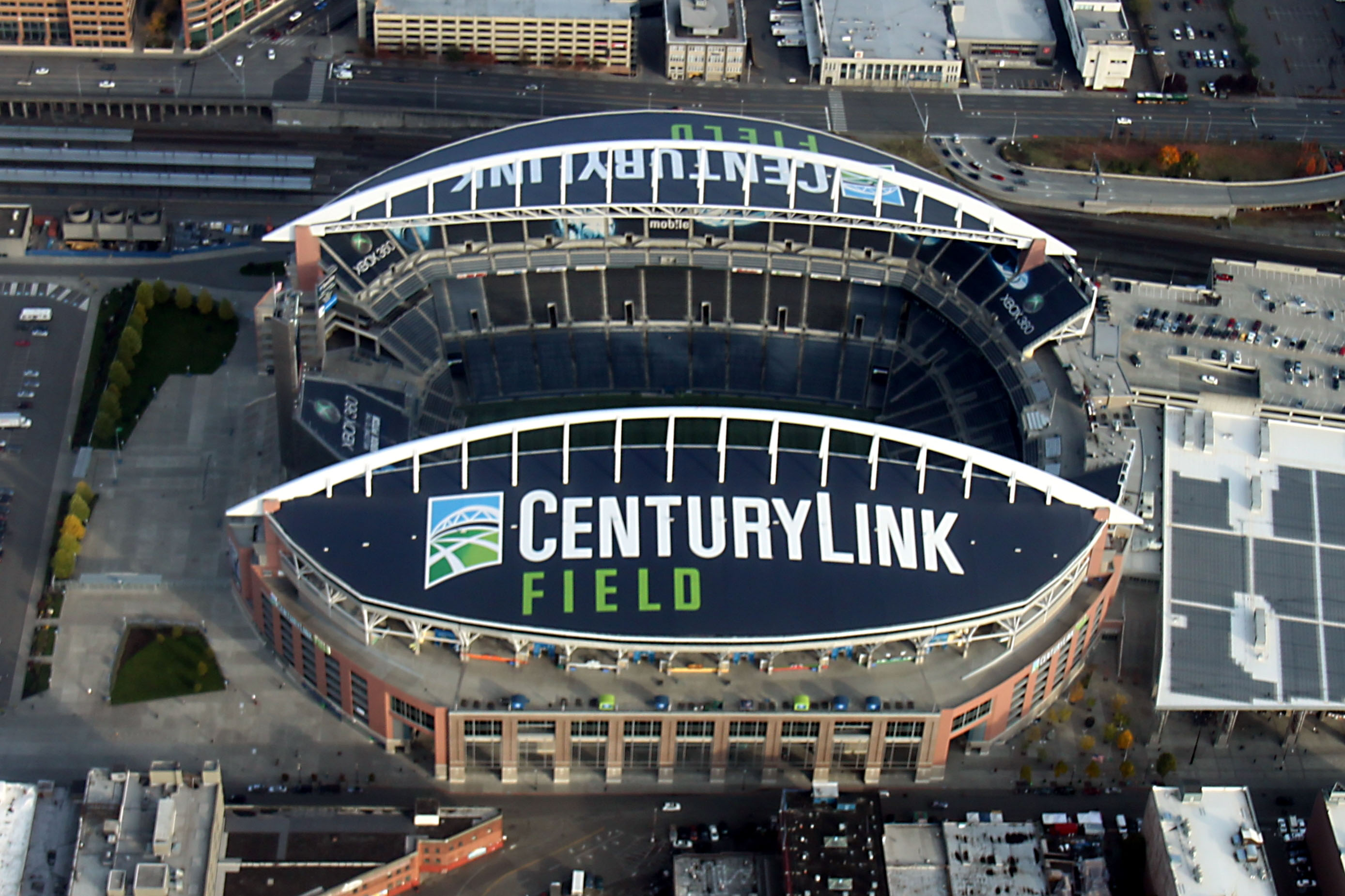
Aerial view of Lumen Field (then CenturyLink Field) in 2011, showing its blue painted roof

The stadium was originally named Seahawks Stadium. The name was changed to Qwest Field in June 2004 after telecommunications carrier Qwest bought the naming rights for $75 million for a period of 15 years. According to the agreement, the proceeds must be used for maintenance and upgrades. A portion of any profit then goes into a $10 million fund Allen guaranteed for youth playfields. As a result of CenturyLink's acquisition of Qwest, the stadium was officially renamed CenturyLink Field on June 23, 2011. CenturyLink renewed its naming rights contract in 2017, paying $162.7 million for the stadium from 2019 to 2033. Although CenturyLink changed its corporate name to Lumen Technologies in September 2020, the stadium was to retain the CenturyLink Field name due to a clause in the contract that permits a one-time name change only if a corporate takeover occurs. Despite that clause, the name was changed to Lumen Field on November 19 following approval from the Washington State Public Stadium Authority.

After the stadium was renamed for CenturyLink in 2011, fans and media outlets speculated on potential nicknames for the venue. An informal reader poll conducted by The Seattle Times showed that "The Clink" was a popular suggestion; it was subsequently used among fans and locals. From 2009 to 2018, the field was entitled "The Xbox Pitch at CenturyLink Field" during Sounders FC matches as part of a sponsorship deal with Microsoft. However, when Zulily took over the Sounders FC sponsorship before the start of the 2019 season, the field was left unnamed; the deal did not include naming rights to the field. A new sponsorship with the Puyallup Tribe of Indians was announced in September 2022, renaming the field to "Emerald Queen Casino Pitch at Lumen Field". The north plaza was renamed to the Muckleshoot Heritage Plaza in 2019 as part of a ten-year naming rights agreement signed with the Muckleshoot Indian Tribe, which included the installation of indigenous Coast Salish artwork.

In addition to its 48 concession stands, restaurants and lounges are located throughout the stadium. Along with typical fare, local Pacific salmon sandwiches, Dungeness crab cakes, and microbrews are served, as well as food from Chinatown–International District restaurants. Aramark was the initial food and beverage service provider for the stadium and exhibition center, having signed a five-year contract in 2001. Levy Restaurants followed with a five-year deal to provide the service for the complex in 2006, while Delaware North Sportservice took over service operations in 2013; under both contracts, First & Goal paid a management fee to the vendor while covering operational costs. The Seahawks subsequently created First & Goal Hospitality to provide the food and beverage service in-house in 2017, doing so until Levy regained the rights via a partnership in 2020; the service continued to operate under the former brand as part of the agreement. In 2023, only 17% of the stadium's employees were represented by a labor union; that figure expanded to around 80% represented across twelve unions by January 2026, with over 500 employees members of Teamsters Local 117 via a collective bargaining agreement signed with First & Goal the prior month.

The pouring rights of non-alcoholic beverages at the stadium were initially held by The Coca-Cola Company, which had a longstanding partnership with the Seahawks prior to 1998, when the team partnered with PepsiCo. In May 2007, Seattle-based Jones Soda outbid Coca-Cola to sign a five-year contract for the rights, making it the only venue in the NFL that did not have a contract with either Coca-Cola or PepsiCo at the time. (Note: Dr Pepper Snapple Group/Keurig Dr Pepper secured non-alcoholic beverage rights to Soldier Field in Chicago and Huntington Bank Stadium in Cleveland in the 2010s.) Jones Soda, known for unusual and holiday-themed soda flavors such as Blue Bubblegum and Turkey & Gravy, said it was working to develop football-related soda flavors, such as "grass-stain". Amid increasing financial turmoil for Jones Soda, the company renegotiated its contract with the Seahawks in September 2009, relinquishing the rights to provide energy drinks and water along with a luxury suite. Both parties ultimately announced their mutual decision to end the Jones sponsorship in June 2010, following which Coca-Cola reclaimed the vending rights with a five-year agreement. The Seahawks and Coca-Cola followed up the deal with multi-year partnership extensions in 2018 and 2023. (Note: Coca-Cola directly handled bottling of its beverages in Washington state until 2017, when the territory franchise was given to Swire via subsidiary Swire Coca-Cola as part of Coca-Cola's effort to refranchise its bottling operations dating back to 2014.)

== Transportation ==
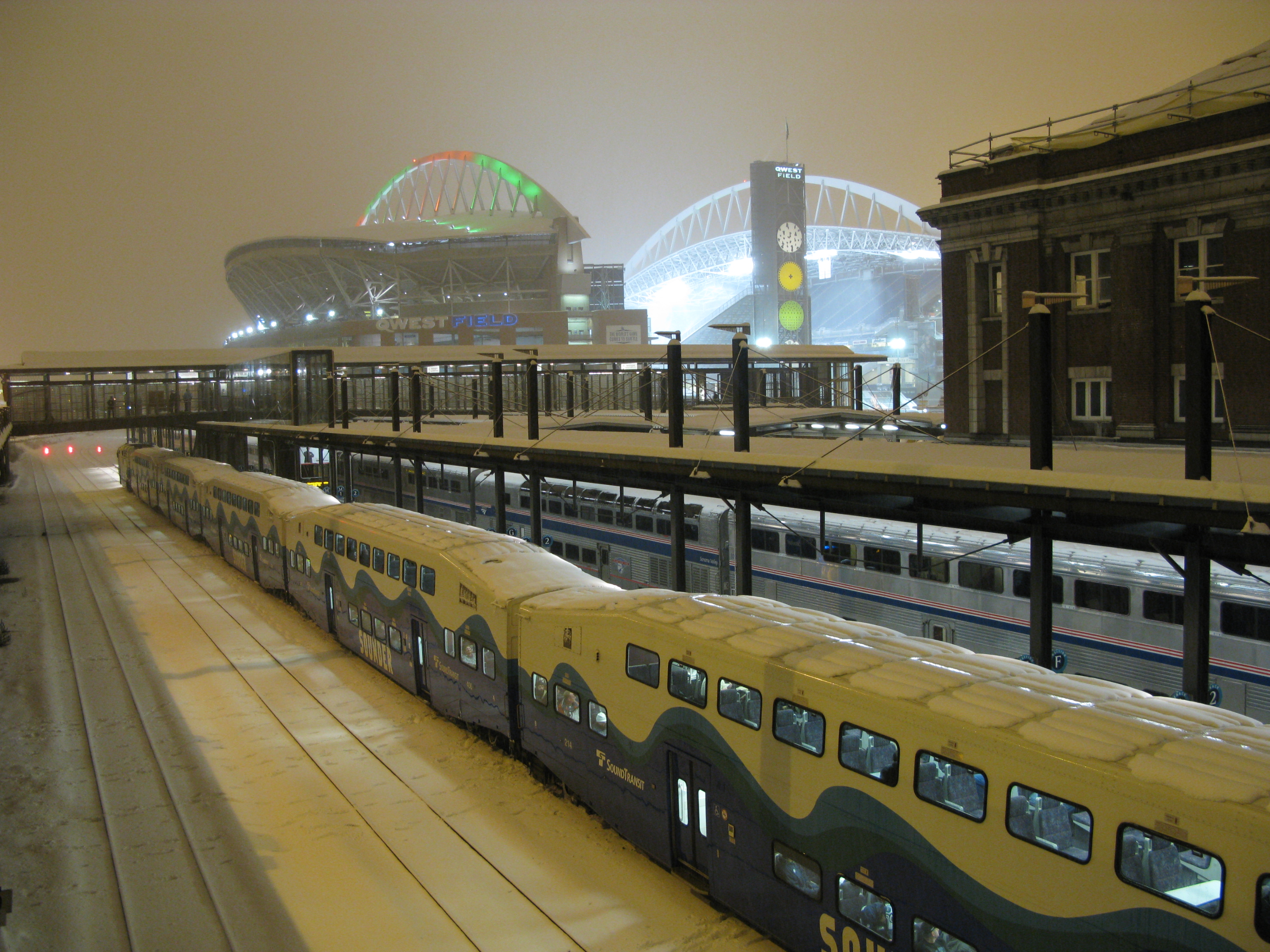
A Sounder commuter train and Amtrak's Coast Starlight at nearby King Street Station after a Seahawks game in 2008

Lumen Field is bordered by the Pioneer Square, International District, and Industrial District neighborhoods of Seattle. The stadium's referendum approval required a transportation management program to coordinate transportation options. First & Goal's facility lease agreement also included a provision to ease gridlock. A "dual event agreement" with T-Mobile Park was established so that two events with a combined attendance of over 58,000 would not occur within four hours of each other. The agreement was also implemented to coordinate mass transit to the stadiums on game days.

The Link light rail system has two stations that serve Lumen Field: Stadium station near the south entrances on the 1 Line; and International District/Chinatown station near the north entrances on the 1 Line and 2 Line. Light rail trains run every 4 to 10 minutes on weekdays and 5 to 10 minutes on weekends. The 1 Line began service on July 18, 2009, the same day as an exhibition match between the Sounders and Chelsea. Local and regional buses serve the area with stops within three blocks of the stadium, and the county's King County Metro bus service formerly offered express routes from several area park and ride lots for games.

Intercity trains serve the stadium through Seattle's King Street Station and overflow tracks accommodate extra trains during events. Sounder commuter trains operate regional service on Sundays if the Seahawks have a home game or for mid-day Sounders FC games on Saturdays. In 2008, the commuter trains carried 64,000 event goers to the two nearby stadiums. Amtrak, primarily through the Pacific Northwest corridor's Cascades route, also serves the station.

Lumen Field is located near the junction of Interstate 5 and Interstate 90 to the east. It is bordered by State Route 99 and the south portal of the State Route 99 tunnel to its west, while the State Route 519 corridor connects I-90 to the neighborhood. Local governments compromised with both the Seahawks and Mariners on the location of new ramps over the train tracks that run along the east sides of Lumen Field and T-Mobile Park. An overpass for South Royal Brougham Way, the road that borders the south edge of the Lumen Field complex, to improve access and safety was completed in May 2010. The stadium has 3,100 parking spaces in its parking garage and 7,500 in the surrounding lots to accommodate automobile traffic. Beginning in December 2011, construction of the Stadium Place mixed-use development project replaced much of the north lot. Per an agreement with King County, the developer replaced the 500 lost parking spots and turn over parking revenue to the Public Stadium Authority.

== Notes ==
Events and tenants
| Preceded by Husky Stadium | Home of the Seattle Seahawks since 2002 | Succeeded by current |
| Preceded by Memorial Stadium (Seattle) | Home of the Seattle Sounders (USL); 2003–2007 | Succeeded by Starfire Sports Complex |
| Preceded by first stadium | Home of Seattle Sounders FC since 2009 | Succeeded by current |
| Preceded by T-Mobile Park | Host of the Seattle Bowl; 2002 | Succeeded by folded |
| Preceded by Husky Stadium | Home of the Washington Huskies; 2011–2012 | Succeeded by Husky Stadium |
