= Seattle Works =

U.S. nonprofit organization

- Type: Non-Profit
- Headquarters: Seattle, Washington
- Location: United States
- Official language: English
- Key people: Tara Smith
- Website: www.seattleworks.org

Seattle Works is a non-profit organization based out of Seattle, Washington, United States, that engages the community by connecting volunteers and corporations and by training young individuals for leadership.

== History ==
A group of young individuals started the organization around 20 plus years ago that is now called Seattle Works. Seattle Works primarily offers one time community volunteer projects also known as hot projects for everyone without the longer term commitment. In the longer term, this facilitates choice for the people to select the cause they wish to align with on basis of their interest and schedule. The hot projects are either organized and run by the Seattle Works team or the partner organization seeking volunteers for their initiatives.

== Company information ==
Seattle Works provides training programs and supports individuals to learn leadership skills for managing volunteer projects. In addition to the leadership training, Seattle Works offers a program known as the Bridge program for individuals to effectively serve on non-profit boards and/or government. Seattle works also organizes the Seattle Works Day: a one-day event coordinating community projects across the city bringing together 1000+ volunteers.
