= Washington State Route 308 =

State highway in Kitsap County, Washington, US

State Route 308

- SR 308 highlighted in red

Route information
- Auxiliary route of SR 3
- Maintained by WSDOT
- Length: 3.42 mi (5.50 km)
- Existed: 1971–present

Major junctions
- West end: SR 3 in Bangor
- East end: Naval Undersea Warfare Center in Keyport

Location
- Country: United States
- State: Washington
- Counties: Kitsap

Highway system
- State highways in Washington; Interstate; US; State; Scenic; Pre-1964; 1964 renumbering; Former
← SR 307	→ SR 310

State Route 308 (SR 308) is a 3.42-mile-long (5.50 km) state highway in the U.S. state of Washington, serving the community of Keyport in Kitsap County. The highway travels generally east from an interchange with SR 3 east of Naval Base Kitsap at Bangor to the main entrance of the Naval Undersea Warfare Center in Keyport. SR 308 was codified as the Keyport branch of State Road 21 in 1929 and continued as the Keyport branch of Primary State Highway 21 (PSH 21) in 1937. During the 1964 highway renumbering, the branch became a section of SR 303, which ran from Bremerton to Bangor and had a spur route serving Keyport. SR 308 was established in 1971 along the old route of SR 303 Spur and was extended in 1991 to the SR 3 freeway after SR 303 was re-routed onto a new freeway in Silverdale.

== Route description ==
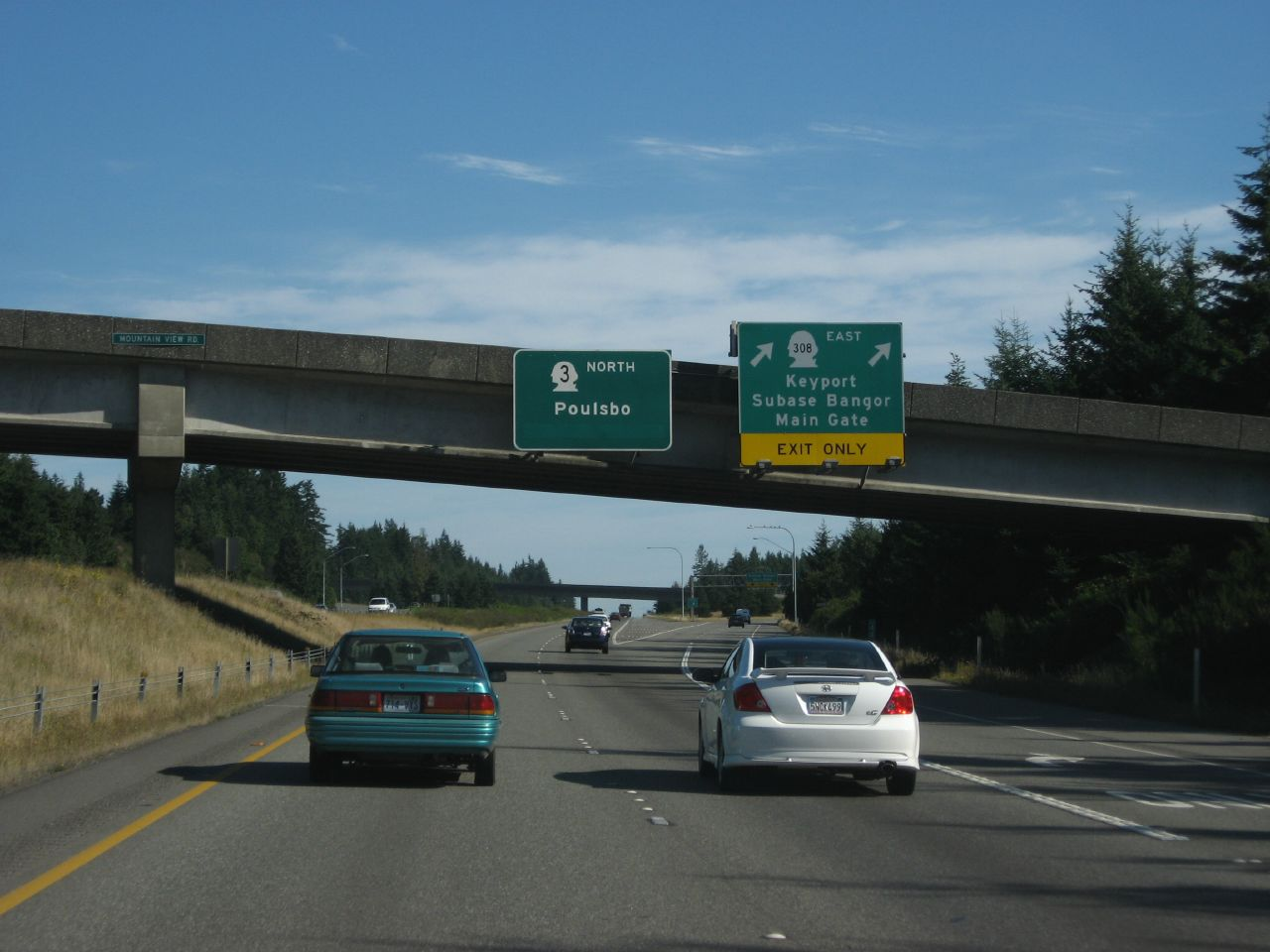
SR 3 northbound at its interchange with SR 308 in Bangor

SR 308 begins as Luoto Road at a diamond interchange with SR 3 east of Naval Base Kitsap at Bangor. The highway travels east through wooded land, intersecting several minor roads until the roadway turns northeast and crosses over Liberty Bay into the unincorporated community of Keyport. Within Keyport, SR 308 passes the Naval Undersea Museum and serves as the main thoroughfare through the community before it ends at the main entrance to the Naval Undersea Warfare Center, continuing east as Strom Avenue into the base.

Every year, the Washington State Department of Transportation (WSDOT) conducts a series of surveys on its highways in the state to measure traffic volume. This is expressed in terms of annual average daily traffic (AADT), which is a measure of traffic volume for any average day of the year. In 2011, WSDOT calculated that the busiest section of the highway was between SR 3 and Liberty Bay, serving 11,000 vehicles, while the least busy section was the bridge over Liberty Bay, serving 6,300 vehicles.

== History ==
The current route of SR 308 was first added to the state highway system in 1929 as the Keyport branch of State Road 21 and was carried over to the primary and secondary state highway system in 1937 as a branch of PSH 21. The branch traveled 2.34 miles (3.77 km) east from PSH 21 near Naval Submarine Base Bangor to the Naval Undersea Warfare Center in Keyport, intersecting Secondary State Highway 21B (SSH 21B) before crossing Liberty Bay. The Keyport branch was incorporated into SR 303, which replaced SSH 21B, with a short spur route serving Keyport. SR 308 was established in 1971 to replace the Keyport spur of SR 303 and extended over SR 303 in 1991 to SR 3 after SR 303 was moved south to end in Silverdale.

== Major intersections ==
The entire highway is in Kitsap County.

Location	mi	km	Destinations	Notes
Bangor	0.00– 0.09	0.00– 0.14	SR 3 – Bremerton, Poulsbo	Western terminus, interchange
Keyport	3.42	5.50	Naval Undersea Warfare Center entrance	Eastern terminus, continues as Strom Avenue
1.000 mi = 1.609 km; 1.000 km = 0.621 mi
