= Keyport, Washington =

- Census-designated place
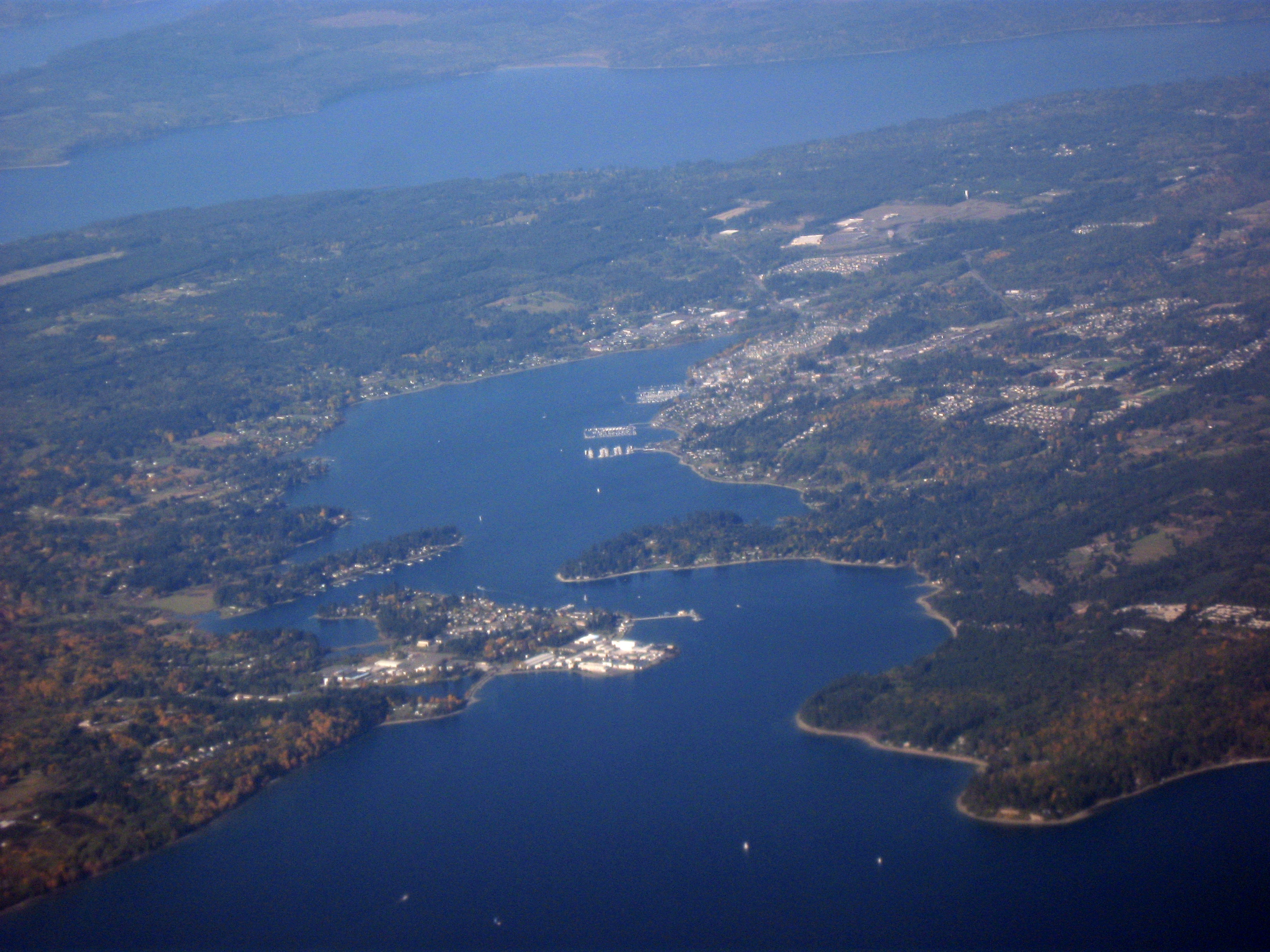
- Aerial view of Keyport looking west from Port Orchard Bay

- Location in Washington and the United States Keyport (the United States)
- Coordinates: 47°42′03″N 122°37′34″W
- Country: United States
- State: Washington
- County: Kitsap

Area
  - Total: 0.70 sq mi (1.81 km^{2})
  - Land: 0.49 sq mi (1.27 km^{2})
  - Water: 0.21 sq mi (0.54 km^{2})
- Elevation: 39 ft (12 m)

Population (2010)
  - Total: 554
  - Density: 1,126/sq mi (434.9/km^{2})
- Time zone: UTC-8 (Pacific (PST))
  - Summer (DST): UTC-7 (PDT)
- ZIP Code: 98345
- Area code(s): 360, 564
- FIPS code: 53-35625
- GNIS feature ID: 2584990

Keyport is an unincorporated community and census-designated place (CDP) located in Kitsap County, Washington, United States. Situated at the eastern terminus of State Route 308 on the Kitsap Peninsula, Keyport is known for its small population and charming coastal setting. As of the 2020 census, Keyport had a population of 576. To its close west, Keyport and Virginia have maritime borders with each other.

The community of Keyport was named after Keyport, New Jersey, in 1896. Its nickname is "Torpedo Town USA". Keyport is situated on a small peninsula named the Keyport Peninsula, jutting into Liberty Bay a few kilometers southeast of Poulsbo. It is the home of a small United States Navy depot tasked with ranging and repairing torpedoes for the US Navy and allies.

Keyport Bible Church, which was established in the early 1900s and incorporated in 1926, stands as the sole church in Keyport. The church's building was dedicated on May 2, 1937, and has since undergone expansions, including the addition of classrooms and a multipurpose building.

== Military bases ==
From its early days, prior to World War I, the naval station in Keyport, Washington, underwent several name changes. Initially known as the Pacific Torpedo Station and later as the Naval Torpedo Station, it eventually became the Naval Undersea Warfare Engineering Station (NUWES) in the 1990s. The land the base sits on was originally a pig farm, which led to some interesting nicknames in the base's early years.

As the Cold War drew to a close, a number of budget cuts, two RIFs and several Base Realignment and Closure (BRAC) actions caused Keyport's parent command in Newport, Rhode Island, to reserve the engineering function to itself, at least on paper, resulting in a name change to Naval Undersea Warfare Center - Division Keyport. One of many subsequent reorganizations resulted in another name change to Naval Sea Systems Command, Keyport (NAVSEA).

Following the current trend of aligning base names with their localities, the current name of the station is Naval Base Kitsap – Keyport, similar to the other facilities in Bremerton and Bangor. However, the tenant commands, NAVSEA and NUWC, have remained unchanged. Keyport survived all these threats without closing its gates, but the civilian workforce at Keyport has fallen from about 3,500 personnel in 1990 to 1,348 in 2005.

== Tourism ==
Keyport's major tourist facility is the Naval Undersea Museum which exhibits many displays on undersea technology, including the bathyscaphe Trieste II, which descended to 20,000 feet (6,100 m). There is also a boat dock operated by the local Port Authority. Kitsap County maintains a small county park on the beach just across SR-308 from the main gate.

Within the base itself, visitors can enjoy amenities such as a boat launch, a park, a spacious picnic area situated on a lagoon, and several hiking trails on "Radio Hill," which are commonly utilized by base employees during their lunch breaks. However, recreational boaters are cautioned to maintain a minimum distance of 300 feet (91 m) from the base's production area.

== Cleanup ==
Like many American bases, the Navy base at Keyport is designated a Superfund site, with four areas requiring action due to chemical contamination, including the former landfill on the western edge of the installation with the potential to contaminate neighboring well water. The chemicals of concern are chlorinated aliphatic hydrocarbons (CAHs) and polychlorinated biphenyls (PCBs). Treatment for CAH hot spots in the landfill is by phytoremediation (growing poplar trees). Other treatments are the removal of PCB-contaminated sediments, upgrading the tide gate, upgrading and maintaining the landfill cover and conducting long-term monitoring.

== Climate ==
This region experiences warm (but not hot) and dry summers, with no average monthly temperatures above 71.6 °F. According to the Köppen Climate Classification system, Keyport has a warm-summer Mediterranean climate, abbreviated "Csb" on climate maps.

== Demographics ==
Historical population
Census	Pop.	Note	%±
2010	554		—
2020	576		4.0%
U.S. Decennial Census; 2000 2010

Keyport first appeared as a census designated place in the 2010 U.S. census.

=== Racial and ethnic composition ===
Keyport CDP, Washington – Racial and ethnic composition Note: the US Census treats Hispanic/Latino as an ethnic category. This table excludes Latinos from the racial categories and assigns them to a separate category. Hispanics/Latinos may be of any race.
Race / Ethnicity (NH = Non-Hispanic)	Pop 2010	Pop 2020	% 2010	% 2020
White alone (NH)	506	451	91.34%	78.30%
Black or African American alone (NH)	5	20	0.90%	3.47%
Native American or Alaska Native alone (NH)	2	3	0.36%	0.52%
Asian alone (NH)	8	16	1.44%	2.78%
Native Hawaiian or Pacific Islander alone (NH)	0	1	0.00%	0.17%
Other race alone (NH)	1	1	0.18%	0.17%
Mixed race or Multiracial (NH)	14	35	2.53%	6.08%
Hispanic or Latino (any race)	18	49	3.25%	8.51%
Total	554	576	100.00%	100.00%
