= Keyport =

Keyport is the name of some places in the United States of America:

- Keyport, New Jersey
- Keyport, Washington
