= Agate Pass =

Tidal strait in the U.S.

Coordinates: 47°42′57″N 122°33′40″W

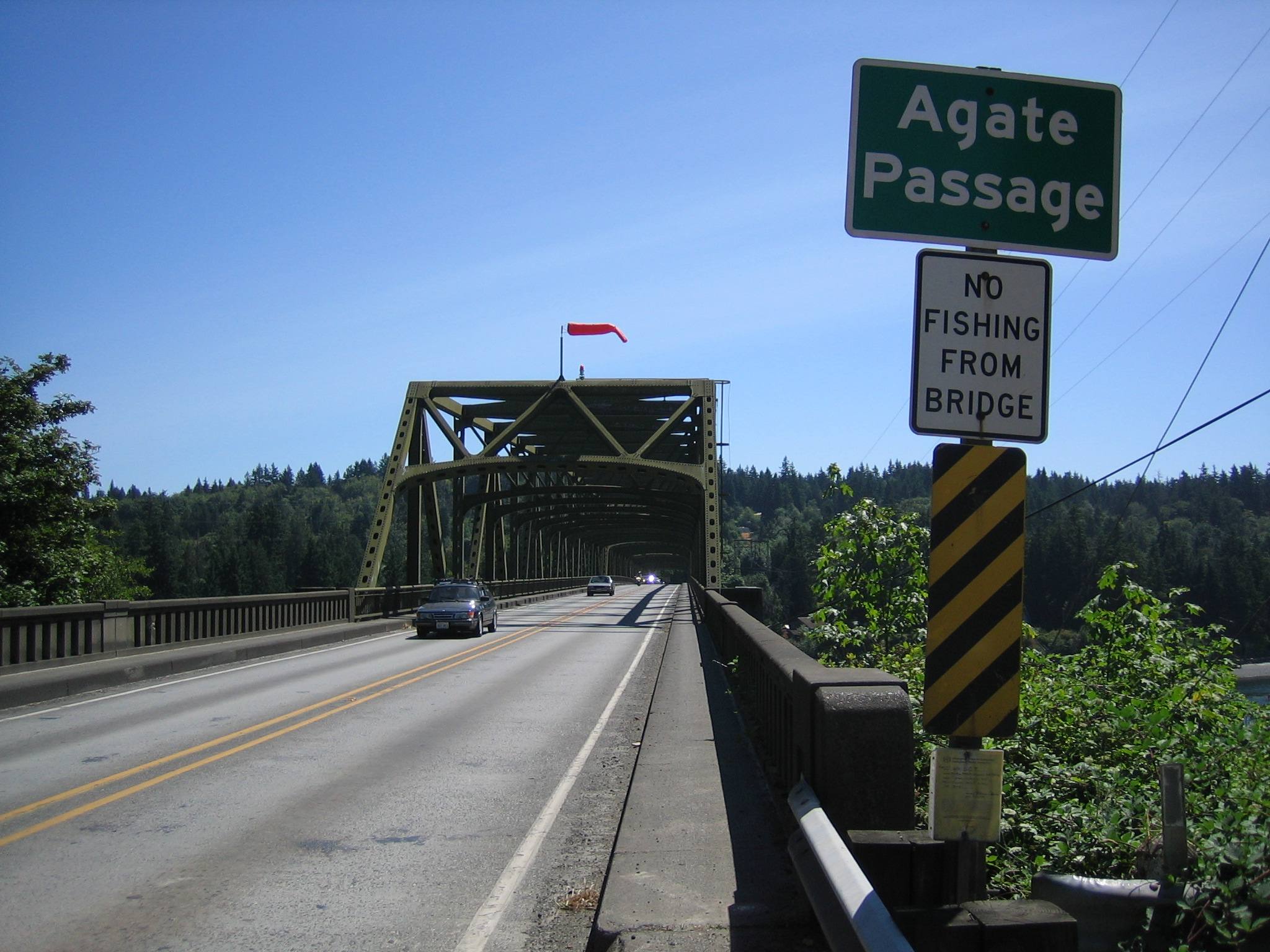
The deck of the Agate Pass Bridge, carrying State Route 305 over the pass

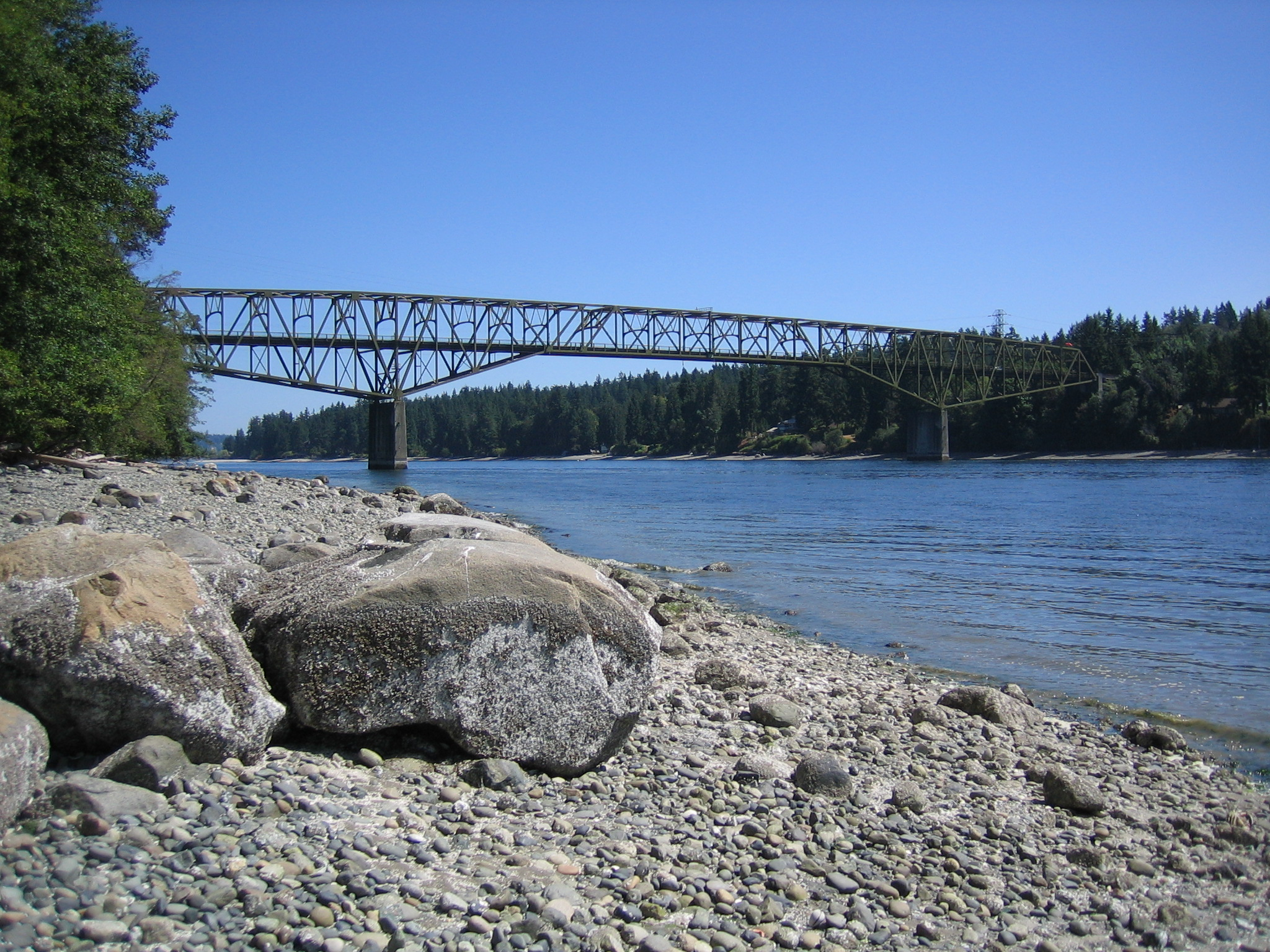
The Agate Pass Bridge from a nearby beach

Agate Pass or Agate Passage is a high-current tidal strait in Puget Sound connecting Port Madison and mainland Kitsap County in the US state of Washington. It lies between Bainbridge Island and the mainland of the Kitsap Peninsula near Suquamish. It leads south towards Bremerton, extending about one mile (1.6 km) in a straight, southwesterly direction. The depth is about 20 feet (6.1 m). The shores are wooded and fairly steep. The shoreline is mostly rocky and fringed with kelp to Point Bolin. The tidal currents have velocities up to six knots; the flood tide sets southwesterly, and the ebb tide northeasterly.

The traditional winter village of the Suquamish people was located on Agate Pass. It was the site of Old Man House, the largest longhouse on Puget Sound, and is the location of Haleets, a petroglyph. Agate Pass was unknown to non-native people until it was discovered by the Wilkes Expedition in 1841. Before then, Europeans thought Bainbridge Island was a peninsula. It was named by U.S. Navy Lt. Charles Wilkes in honor of one of the members of the expedition, Alfred Thomas Agate.

In 1950, a fixed highway bridge, the Agate Pass Bridge was built, connecting Bainbridge Island to the Kitsap Peninsula for the first time. The bridge is listed on the National Register of Historic Places.
