= Mission Data Interface =

Mission Data Interface (MDI) is a framework designed by the US Navy to allow mission data to be exchanged between systems within a battle group. MDI implements the FORCEnet (Fn) Functional Concept in accordance with the Navy Open Architecture Computing Environment (OACE) specifications, with an emphasis on Service-oriented Architecture (SOA) design.

== History ==
Mission Data Interface (MDI) is a spin-off project from the Aircraft Carrier Tactical Support System (CVTSC) system – which is installed on all current deployed US aircraft carriers. MDI was originally intended to extend the CVTSC/SSDS interfaces to share mission data with other remote battle group and theater-level (WAN internet scale) participants configured with the MDI capability. Mission data are all data generated during a mission, including electrical notes, commands, and even operator views. These data can be share among all systems within the battle space in near real-time; as well as recorded for post-mission analysis and training. The proposal to establish the MDI project was submitted to Naval Undersea Warfare Center (NUWC) Keyport management sometime in late 2004. The project was approved by IWS5 Program Office and work started sometime in 2005.

MDI contains 2 major API libraries: RMI-based API and web services-based API.
