= Margaret Olofsson Bergman =

American weaver, teacher and designer

- Born: 22 June 1872; Jämtland County, Sweden
- Died: 18 July 1948 (aged 76); Poulsbo, WA, United States
- Occupation: Weaver

Margaret Olofsson Bergman (22 June 1872 – 18 July 1948) was a weaver, teacher, and designer from the Pacific Northwest. During the 1930s, Bergman designed and patented two looms: the Bergman Suitcase loom and the Bergman Floor loom. Each loom was designed with unique folding frames that enabled the loom to collapse even when fully warped. Her husband John and son Arthur built looms at their home in Breidablick, near Poulsbo, Washington. Later, a section of a barn on the property was converted to a store called the Yarn Barn where yarn could be purchased. She also was the founder of several weaving guilds and developed a weaving structure called the 'Margaret Bergman technique'.
