= Poulsbo Bread =

Variety of multigrain bread

- Type: bread
- Inventor: Marion Sluys
- Inception: 1974
- Available: yes (Note: availability limited to one retail location)
- Notes

Poulsbo Bread is the name of a proprietary variety of multigrain bread that originated in Poulsbo, Washington, United States, in the 1970s, and which was distributed internationally until the 2000s. The creation of the bread was inspired by a Bible passage. As of 2018 it is sold only at a single retail location in Poulsbo.

== History ==
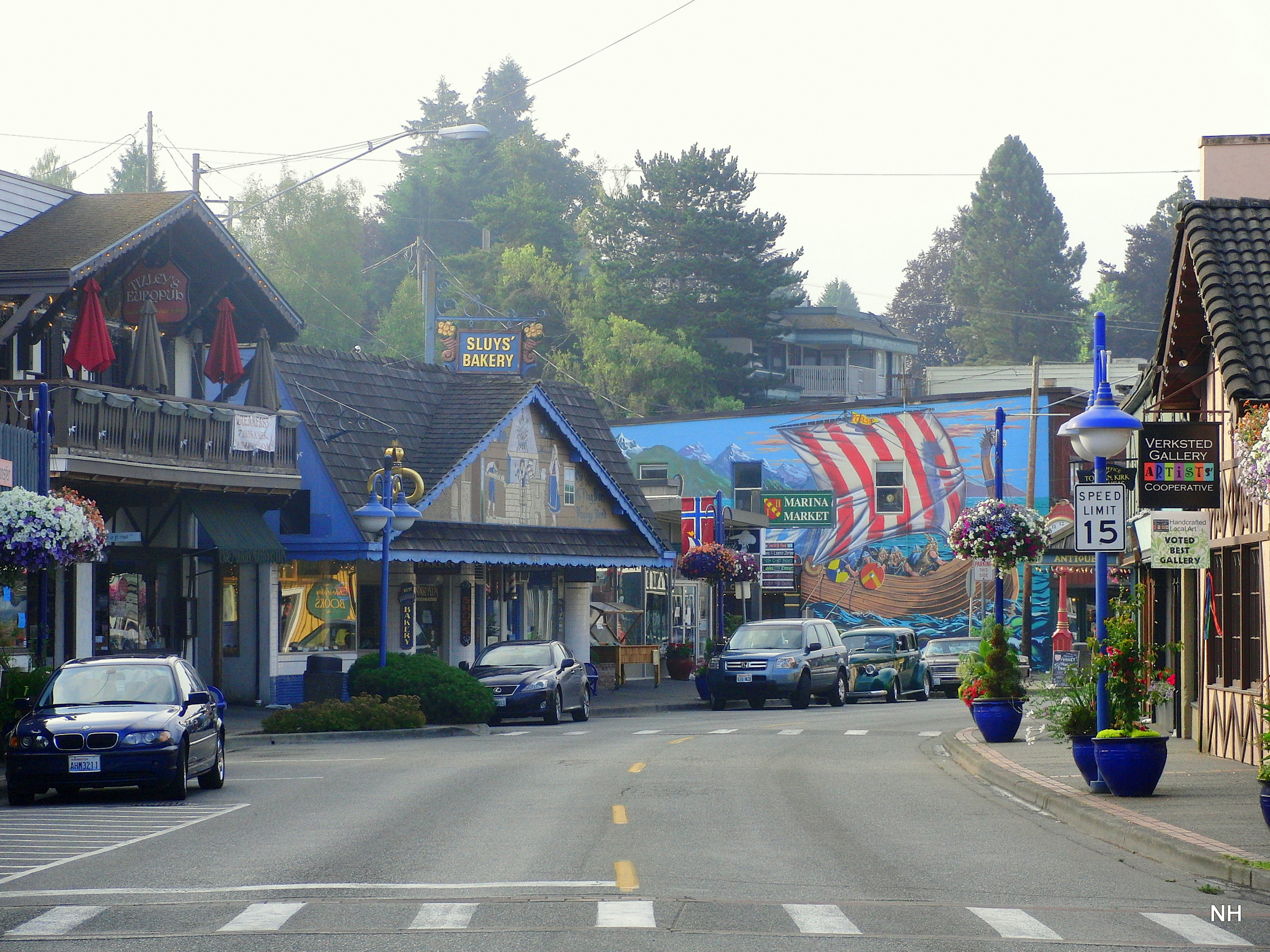
Poulsbo Bread was first baked at Sluys' Bakery (pictured) in Poulsbo, Washington

Poulsbo Bread was developed by Marion Sluys, the owner of Sluys' Bakery in Poulsbo, from a biblical recipe. In 1974, after reading a passage in the Book of Ezekiel directing the baking of a specific type of multigrain bread, Sluys claims he decided to attempt to prepare the recipe in his Poulsbo bakery, naming the resulting product Poulsbo Bread. The passage in question, Ezekiel 4:9, reads:

Take thou also unto thee wheat, and barley, and beans, and lentiles, and millet, and fitches, and put them in one vessel, and make thee bread thereof, according to the number of the days that thou shalt lie upon thy side, three hundred and ninety days shalt thou eat thereof.

According to Sluys' Bakery, the bread was licensed to Franz Family Bakeries in the early 1980s for national and international distribution, with the license terms requiring Ezekiel 4:9 be imprinted on all packaging. In 2011, Franz discontinued mass production of Poulsbo Bread due to lagging demand for the product, however, as of 2018 the bread continues to be hand-mixed at Sluys' Bakery for local sale. Sluys' Bakery produces Poulsbo Bread in three varieties: regular, dark, and raisin.

== Reception ==
The bread has been variously described as "famous" and "world famous". According to Sea Magazine, Poulsbo Bread is the "best-known concoction" of Sluys' Bakery, and few boaters visiting Poulsbo leave the town "without carrying home a loaf or two". In 2008, a student of Libby High School in Libby, Montana, credited his decision to move to Kitsap County and attend Olympic College on an athletic scholarship to his affinity for Poulsbo Bread, saying he regularly purchased the product at his local grocery store and, after reading a description of the town of Poulsbo on the packaging of the bread, thought "it would be a cool place to live".

== See also ==
- List of breads
- Ezekiel bread
