= Washington State Route 307 =

State highway in Kitsap County, Washington, US

State Route 307
- Bond Road
- SR 307 is highlighted in red.

Route information
- Auxiliary route of SR 3
- Maintained by WSDOT
- Length: 5.25 mi (8.45 km)
- Existed: 1991–present

Major junctions
- South end: SR 305 in Poulsbo
- North end: SR 104 near Kingston

Location
- Country: United States
- State: Washington
- Counties: Kitsap

Highway system
- State highways in Washington; Interstate; US; State; Scenic; Pre-1964; 1964 renumbering; Former
← SR 305	→ SR 308

State Route 307 (SR 307) is a 5.25-mile-long (8.45 km) state highway in the U.S. state of Washington. The highway, known as Bond Road, travels within Kitsap County between SR 305 in Poulsbo and SR 104 west of Kingston. SR 307 was created in 1991 on the existing Bond Road, which had been paved since the 1950s.

== Route description ==
SR 307 begins as the five-lane Bond Road at a traffic signal with SR 305 in Poulsbo and travels northeast, narrowing into a two-lane highway as it travels into a heavily forested area along Dogfish Creek. Bond Road intersects several rural roads and continues into an industrial area, ending at an intersection with SR 104 west of Kingston.

Every year, the Washington State Department of Transportation (WSDOT) conducts a series of surveys on its highways in the state to measure traffic volume. This is expressed in terms of annual average daily traffic (AADT), which is a measure of traffic volume for any average day of the year. In 2011, WSDOT calculated that between 13,000 and 16,000 vehicles per day used the highway as a route between Poulsbo and Kingston.

== History ==
SR 307 was created in 1991 along the route of Bond Road between SR 305 and SR 104, which had been a paved road since the 1950s. No major revisions to the highway have occurred since 1991; however, the southern terminus at SR 305 was rebuilt in 2009 during the expansion of the highway through Poulsbo.

== Major intersections ==
The entire highway is in Kitsap County.

Location	mi	km	Destinations	Notes
Poulsbo	0.00	0.00	SR 305 – Bainbridge Island, Bremerton	
	5.25	8.45	SR 104 – Port Gamble, Kingston	
1.000 mi = 1.609 km; 1.000 km = 0.621 mi
