= Naval Undersea Warfare Center =

Warfare Center of the U.S. Navy

Coordinates: 41°31′59″N 71°18′32″W

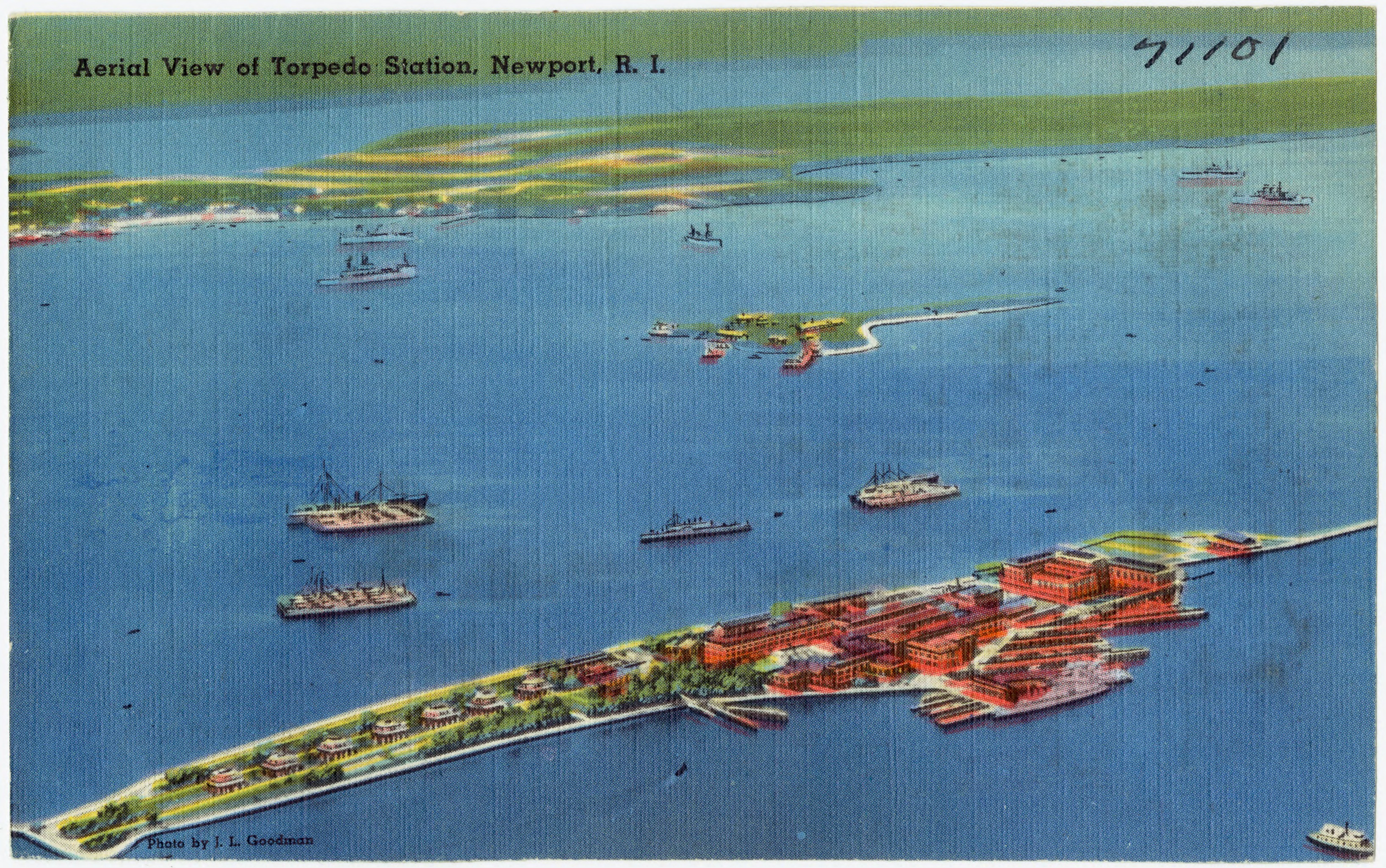
Postcard aerial view of Goat Island

The Naval Undersea Warfare Center (NUWC) is the United States Navy's full-spectrum research, development, test and evaluation, engineering and fleet support center for submarines, autonomous underwater systems, and offensive and defensive weapons systems associated with undersea warfare. It is one of the corporate laboratories of the Naval Sea Systems Command. NUWC is headquartered in Newport, Rhode Island and has two major subordinate activities: Division Newport and Division Keyport in Keyport, Washington. NUWC also controls the Fox Island facility and Gould Island. It employs more than 4,400 civilian and military personnel, with budgets over $1 billion.

The current entity is composed of many elements of Navy undersea research, particularly acoustics and acoustic systems with weapons research and development history dating to the 19th century. Two major laboratories, in Newport and New London composed the largest elements of what is now Division Newport. Those laboratories were themselves made up of consolidated older laboratories and facilities dating from World War I.

== Early history ==
=== Newport, Rhode Island ===
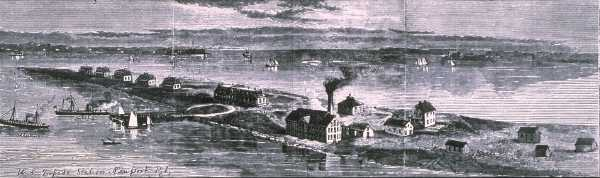
C. 1900, picture of U.S. Torpedo Station on Goat Island

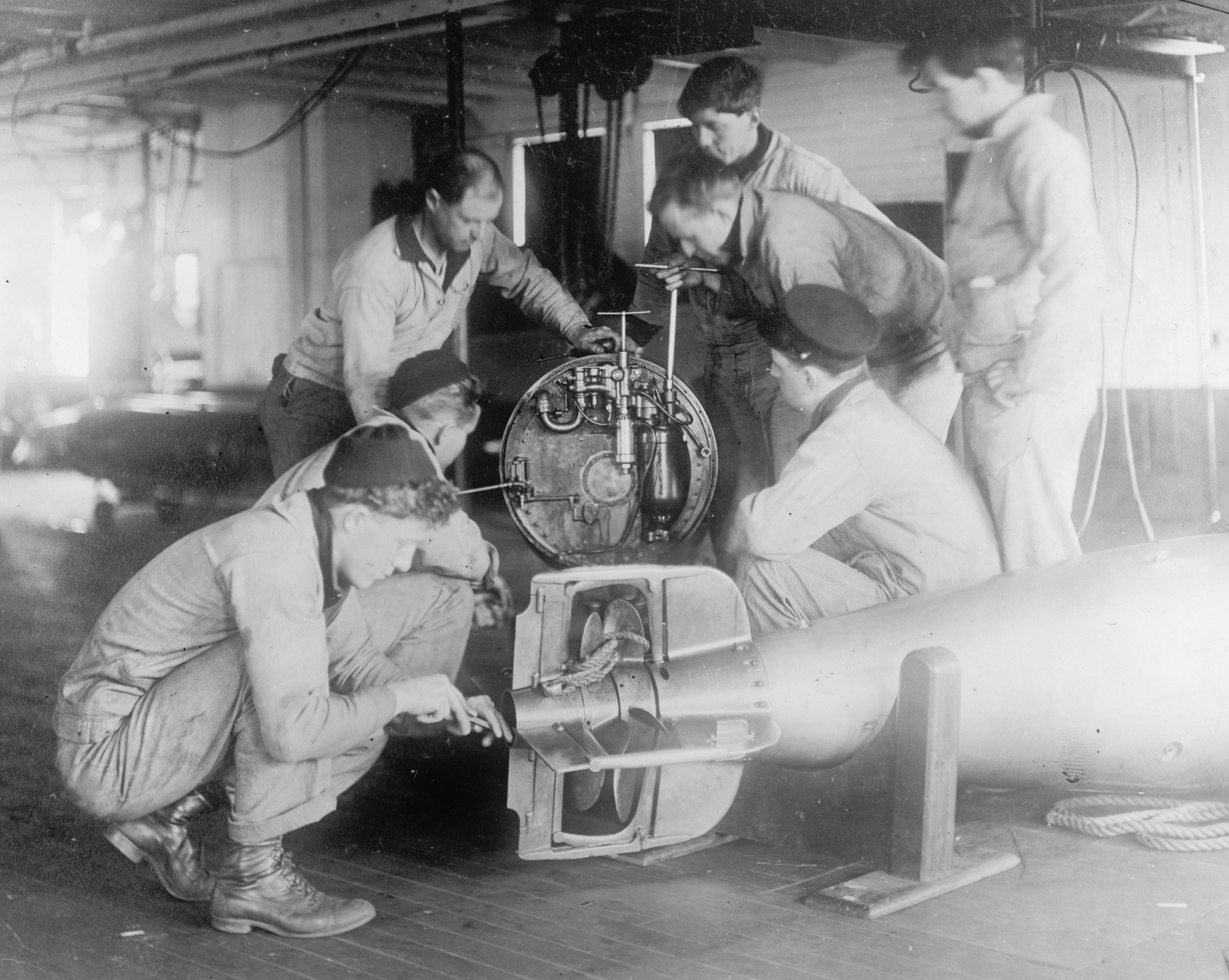
Sailors at the U.S. Torpedo Station in Newport ca. 1910-1926

In 1869, the U.S. Naval Torpedo Station was founded in Newport, Rhode Island on Goat Island, the site of Fort Wolcott which was built in 1702 and served as an Army fort from 1794 to 1835. During the 1890s, Charles Munroe and John Bernadou worked at Newport, patenting a formulation of nitrocellulose colloided with ether and alcohol which was used as smokeless powder for naval artillery through the two World Wars. The Army adopted the Navy formulation in 1908 and began manufacture at Picatinny Arsenal.

A factory was built in 1907 to manufacture steam torpedoes for the Navy. The torpedo factory became a major employer in the Newport area, as Rhode Island congressmen protected it from competition. The Torpedo Station designed the Mark VI magnetic influence fuze for torpedoes during the 1920s. The Naval Torpedo Station researched and tested underwater weaponry through World Wars I and II, creating additional facilities on Rose Island, Fox Island, and Gould Island. In 1951, the station on Goat Island was reorganized:

For the next 15 years, it was the Underwater Ordnance Station, and then the Underwater Weapons Research and Engineering Station until 1970. That year, the Underwater Sound Laboratory from New London, Conn. was combined with the Newport facility to form the Naval Underwater Systems Center or NUSC. In 1992, the command was reorganized as the Naval Undersea Warfare Center, Division Newport.

=== New London, Connecticut ===
Pier area, Naval Experimental Station, New London circa 1918.

New London, Connecticut had been the site of World War I sound research since the establishment of the Naval Experimental Station there as a result of meetings between Navy and the Submarine Signal Company, manufacturer of submarine signals as navigation aids and active in underwater acoustics since establishment in 1901, the Western Electric Company and the General Electric Company. The companies, under naval supervision had established an acoustical research station at East Point, Nahant, Massachusetts. The Navy, under one of its officers involved in the corporate effort, established the Naval Experimental Station at Fort Trumbull where physicists and engineers, including scientists from nearby universities, worked under the direction of the Special Board on Antisubmarine Devices.

Though that laboratory had closed with the end of that war the same criteria and some of the same people advising made New London the logical place to site the East Coast laboratory in response to the Chief, Bureau of Ships, now Naval Sea Systems Command (NAVSEA), April 10, 1941 request to the National Defense Research Committee to establish both an East and West coast antisubmarine warfare research laboratory. On July 1, 1941 the New London laboratory's establishment got approval with management by Columbia University for a wide range of antisubmarine warfare work including, passive sonar, ocean acoustics and recording of underwater sounds for that work.

In 1944 the Naval Research Laboratory (NRL) directed reorganization of the Underwater Sound Laboratory at New London for peacetime operation consolidating the Harvard Underwater Sound Laboratory, which had focused on physics of underwater sound, surface ship sonar and weapons systems, in Cambridge, Massachusetts with the New London laboratory. After recruiting scientists from both efforts the new Navy Underwater Sound Laboratory was established on March 1, 1945.

Significant accomplishments during World War II included the development of greatly improved surface ship and submarine sonar systems, acoustic homing torpedoes, sonobuoys, and acoustic mines. This work contributed greatly to the success against U-boats in the Battle of the Atlantic and the near-total destruction of the Imperial Japanese Navy and merchant fleets in the Pacific War.

== Predecessor organizations ==
Naval Underwater Systems Center (NUSC) lineage chart showing predecessor organizations.

=== Navy Underwater Sound Laboratory (NUSL) 1945—1970 ===
In July 1945 the Harvard facility's equipment and many of its personnel were moved to the new Navy Underwater Sound Laboratory, New London. NRL oversaw NUSL until turning over direction to the Bureau of Ships. Navy laboratories were reorganized in 1966 under Director of Naval Laboratories, Naval Material Command, to consolidate expertise and decrease competition among laboratories.

The Bermuda Research Detachment, Tudor Hill Laboratory after formation of Naval Underwater Systems Center in 1970, and its Argus Island offshore tower and support/research vessel Erline were field detachments of NUSL. The laboratory was unique in that it was the only one in the Atlantic to be located adjacent to and have access to an operational Naval Facility of the Sound Surveillance System (SOSUS).

Research intensified during the Cold War, which was as much a technology race with the Soviets as it was an arms race. The Sound Lab's efforts were key to the further development of both submarine and anti-submarine warfare.

=== Naval Underwater Systems Center (NUSC) 1970—1992 ===
On July 1, 1970 the Naval Material Command independent laboratories, Navy Underwater Sound Laboratory at New London and the Naval Underwater Weapons Research and Engineering Station (NUWS) at Newport, were administratively combined to form the Naval Underwater Systems Center (NUSC) with headquarters in Newport.

The Bermuda Research Detachment, formed by NUSL in 1961, became the NUSC Tudor Hill Laboratory, a major field detachment on formation of NUSC in 1970. In July the next year the Atlantic Undersea Test and Evaluation Center (AUTEC) located in the Tongue of the ocean with the main facility on Andros Island, Bahamas, with a logistics component located at the Palm Beach International Airport became a detachment of NUSC. Among the smaller facilities and detachments were the underwater ranges at Narragansett Bay and Rhode Island Sound, field activities at Seneca Lake Facility, New York, Dodge Pond at Niantic, Connecticut, the Central Test and Evaluation Activity (CTEA), Fort Lauderdale, Florida.

NUSC was the lead laboratory in partnership with eight North Atlantic Treaty Organization (NATO) nations to for the instrumented Azores Fixed Acoustic Range (AFAR) in the Azores based on Santa Maria Island. The range features three bottom fixed towers 124 ft (37.8 m) high by 43 ft (13.1 m) across set approximately in an equalateral triangle. Two towers are receive only and one is transmit and receive. The principle studies are in acoustic propagation, reverberations and ambient noise.

Much of the work involved sonar suites for both submarines and surface vessels; however, other work ranged from improved periscopes, computing, combat control systems, and communications. Illustrating the wide variety of work are some examples:

- NUSC continued work begun by its NUSL predecessor on Extremely Low Frequency (ELF) radio commendations with submarines proving communication with Seawolf in 1963. That system went operational with first use on an attack submarine with Batfish in 1976 and for ballistic missile submarines with Simon Bolivar two years later.
- NUSC became the responsible for design of the MARK 113 fire control systems for Polaris/Poseidon ballistic missile submarines after its design proposal for the MARK 113 MOD 9 Conversion Program was chosen over that of the Naval Ordnance Laboratory. System development had begun at Newport in 1968 and continued after the formation of NUSC with successful introduction and selection of NUSC for oversight in 1971.
- Beginning in 1970 NUSC began work for the Naval Electronics Systems Command (NAVELEX) on tactical towed arrays for use by faster surface ships. That work led to NAVELEX sponsorship of research and development of towed surveillance arrays to augment the fixed bottom SOSUS arrays. That work, in cooperation with the NAVELEX Naval Undersea Center (consolidated with Naval Electronics Laboratory Center in 1977 to become Naval Ocean Systems Center (NOSC)), San Diego, to develop what became the Surveillance Towed Array Sensor System.

On 2 January 1992 a major consolidation of Navy laboratories resulted in NUSC becoming a part of the Naval Undersea Warfare Center.

=== Naval Undersea Warfare Engineering Station (NUWES) Keyport ===
In 1992 Naval Undersea Warfare Engineering Station (NUWES) at Keyport, Washington, became Naval Undersea Warfare Center (NUWC), Division Keyport. The station originated with realization that the only torpedo facility was on the Atlantic coast as the Navy increasingly began operating in the Pacific following the Spanish–American War. The Pacific Coast Torpedo Station was established on Puget Sound in 1914. In 1930 the name was changed to Naval Torpedo Station Keyport and in 1978 to Naval Undersea Warfare Engineering Station.

Keyport focused on torpedoes and other undersea weapons and in later decades undersea vehicles. Aside from the ranges at Keyport the station operated ranges in California and Hawthorne, Nevada and Hawaii.

=== Other elements ===
In the early 1940s a need for calibration and testing of sonar transducers was met by establishing the Underwater Sound Reference Laboratory (USRL). It was headquartered in New York with two field stations. One was at Orlando, Florida and the other was at Mountain Lakes, New Jersey. All activities were transferred to Orlando after the war under the Office of Naval Research. In 1966 the organization was renamed the Underwater Sound Reference Detachment (USRD) until its closure in 1997. The functions were transferred to Naval Undersea Warfare Center Division Newport, Underwater Sound Reference Division.

The Orlando lab was built on the archeological site of Fort Gatlin on the shore of Lake Gem Mary because the sinkhole-formed lake is very deep. The Orlando lab closed in 1997 due to the Base Realignment and Closure (BRAC) with all its functions moving to Newport. The Leesburg, Florida deep-water facility at Bugg Spring, established in 1965, remained open. The Orlando building was turned over to civil administration thereafter.

== See also ==
- U.S. Naval Torpedo Station, Alexandria
- Naval Undersea Museum
- Atlantic Undersea Test and Evaluation Center – AUTEC
- Mission Data Interface
