= Washington State Route 305 =

State highway in northwestern Washington, US

State Route 305

- SR 305 is highlighted in red, ferry in pink

Route information
- Auxiliary route of SR 3
- Maintained by WSDOT
- Length: 13.50 mi (21.73 km) Mileage does not include ferry route
- Existed: 1964–present

Major junctions
- South end: SR 519 at Colman Dock in Seattle
- SR 307 in Poulsbo
- North end: SR 3 in Poulsbo

Location
- Country: United States
- State: Washington
- Counties: King, Kitsap

Highway system
- State highways in Washington; Interstate; US; State; Scenic; Pre-1964; 1964 renumbering; Former
← SR 304	→ SR 307

State Route 305 (SR 305) is a 13.50-mile-long (21.73 km) state highway in the U.S. state of Washington, primarily serving Bainbridge Island in Kitsap County and connecting it to Seattle in King County via the Seattle–Bainbridge Island ferry. The highway travels north through Bainbridge Island and leaves the island on the Agate Pass Bridge into the Kitsap Peninsula. SR 305 continues northwest through Poulsbo, intersecting SR 307 and ending at the SR 3 freeway. The highway was created during the 1964 highway renumbering and was preceded by Secondary State Highway 21A (SSH 21A), established in 1937. The ferry, part of the highway since 1994, is served by the Jumbo Mark-II-class MV Tacoma and MV Wenatchee and operates on a 35-minute crossing time.

== Route description ==
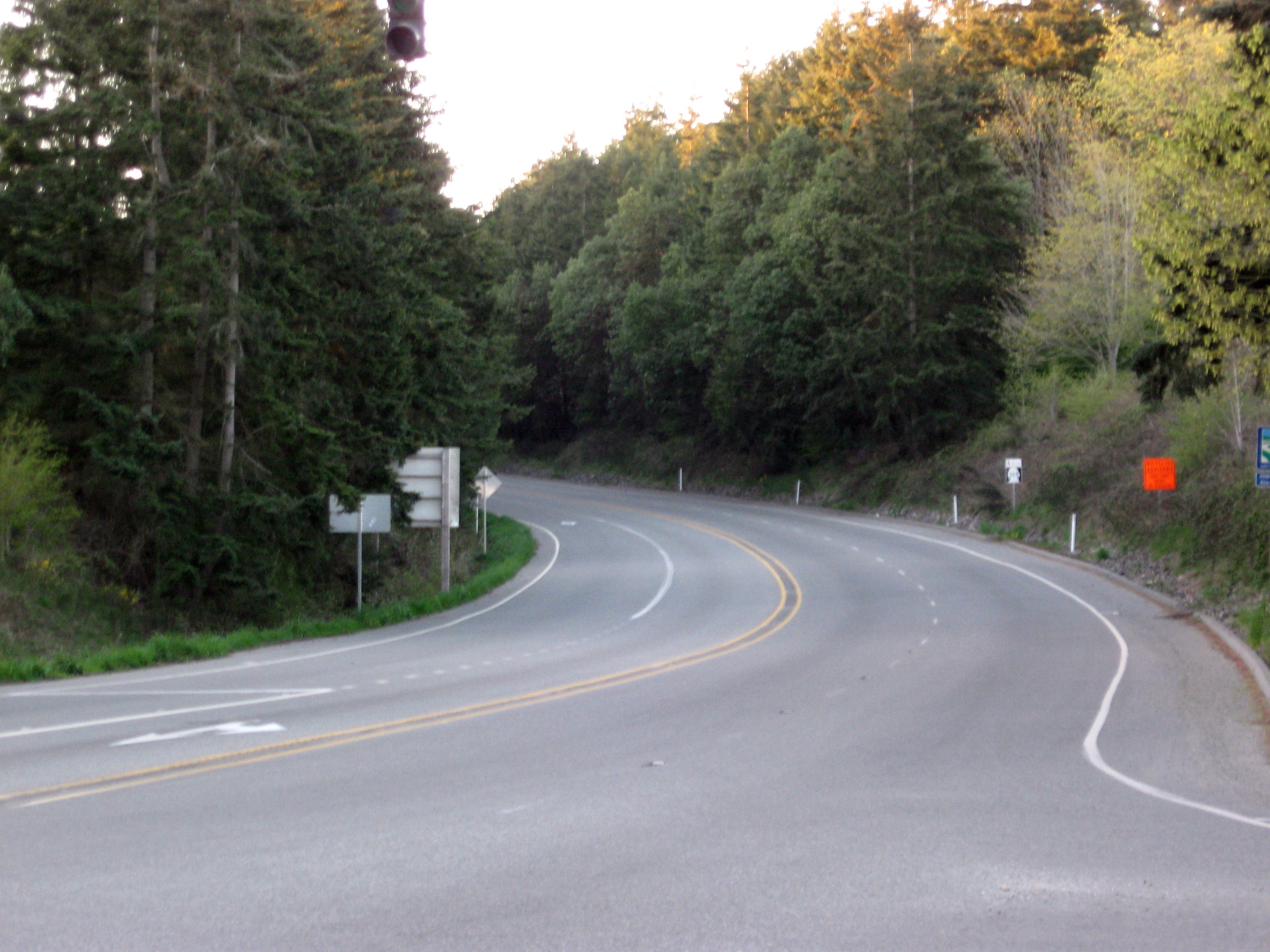
SR 305 northbound in Winslow on Bainbridge Island shortly after leaving the ferry terminal

SR 305 begins at Colman Dock in Seattle and travels on the Seattle–Bainbridge Island ferry to Bainbridge Island. The ferry, operated by Washington State Ferries (WSF), is on a 8.6-mile-long (13.8 km) route and is served by the Jumbo Mark-II-class MV Tacoma and MV Wenatchee, traveling at a speed of 18 knots (21 mph) for a 35-minute crossing. The ferries depart from Colman Dock and travel northwest across Elliott Bay and Puget Sound to Winslow, part of the city of Bainbridge Island. As of Spring 2013, WSF operates the ferry on 24 weekday crossings and 22 weekend crossings, as a $8.00 toll for adult passengers is charged with prepaid Wave2Go cards being accepted.

SR 305 leaves the ferry in Winslow on Bainbridge Island and travels north through the island's interior, passing Bainbridge High School before turning northwest near Murden Cove. The highway travels over Agate Pass on the truss cantilever Agate Pass Bridge, listed on the National Register of Historic Places. SR 305 continues northwest along the coast of Liberty Bay, passing through Lemolo and entering Poulsbo to intersect the southern terminus of SR 307. The highway continues northwest to end at a partial cloverleaf interchange with the SR 3 freeway north of the city.

Every year, the Washington State Department of Transportation (WSDOT) conducts a series of surveys on its highways in the state to measure traffic volume. This is expressed in terms of annual average daily traffic (AADT), which is a measure of traffic volume for any average day of the year. In 2011, WSDOT calculated that between 5,300 and 27,000 vehicles per day used the highway, mostly in Poulsbo. The Seattle–Bainbridge ferry was the busiest route in the Puget Sound, carrying 6.119 million passengers and 1.194 million vehicles in 2012.

== History ==
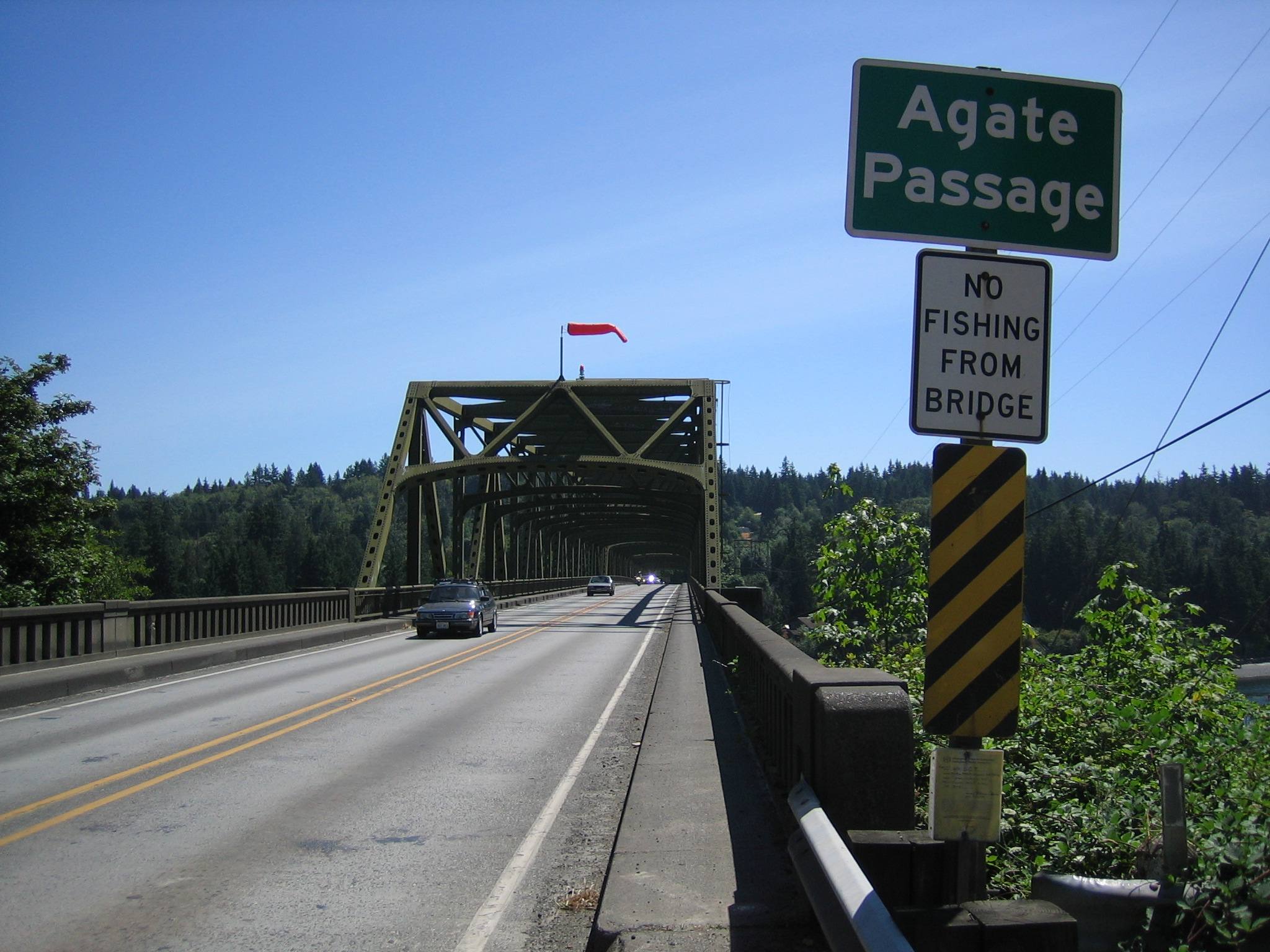
SR 305 southbound on the Agate Pass Bridge, built in 1950 to replace an earlier ferry.

SR 305 was established during the 1964 highway renumbering as a replacement for SSH 21A, which traveled 13.45 miles (21.65 km) between the Winslow ferry dock and Primary State Highway 21 (PSH 21) northwest of Poulsbo. SSH 21A originally began at the Port Blakely ferry dock when it was codified in 1937, but was moved north to Winslow in 1949. The highway connected Bainbridge Island to the Kitsap Peninsula via a car ferry that began in the 1920s and was replaced by the 1,229-foot-long (375 m) Agate Pass Bridge after it opened on October 2, 1950 with a 35-cent toll. The bridge, which cost $1.4 million, had its tolls removed in October 1951 after it was paid for by a bond issue passed by the Washington State Legislature. The highway was later straightened in segments in the late 1950s by the Department of Highways before becoming SR 305 and being re-codified in 1970. SR 305 was extended north to the newly built SR 3 freeway and east on the Seattle–Winslow Ferry to Seattle in 1994. No major revisions to the highway have occurred since 1994; however, WSDOT widened SR 305 in 2009 within Poulsbo and installed high-occupancy vehicle lanes (HOV lanes) for use during peak hours.

Regular boat service between Bainbridge Island and Seattle began with passenger and freight-carrying steamboats. The Eagle Harbor Transportation Co. operated various steamers on the route, including the Bainbridge and Chippewa, until WSF was created in 1951 to manage most ferries in the Puget Sound. WSF operated the MV Tillikum and steam ferry San Mateo on the route, with the MV Illahee used on extra runs. The 2,500-passenger and 160-car Super class MV Kaleetan and MV Elwha replaced the older ferries in 1968. The Jumbo Mark II class MV Tacoma and MV Wenatchee were built and placed on the route in 1997 and 1998 respectively to serve growing traffic on the older ferries.

== Major intersections ==
County	Location	mi	km	Destinations	Notes
King	Seattle			Colman Dock – Bremerton Ferry (SR 304) / Alaskan Way (SR 519)	Termini of SR 305 and SR 519
Puget Sound		0.00	0.00	Seattle–Bainbridge Island ferry	
Kitsap	Bainbridge Island	0.00	0.00	Bainbridge ferry terminal	
Kitsap	Agate Pass	6.80– 7.03	10.94– 11.31	Agate Pass Bridge	
Kitsap	Poulsbo	12.80	20.60	SR 307 north (Bond Road) – Kingston	South end of SR 307
Kitsap	Poulsbo	13.43– 13.50	21.61– 21.73	SR 3 – Bremerton, Olympic Peninsula	Interchange
1.000 mi = 1.609 km; 1.000 km = 0.621 mi
