= Agate Pass Bridge =

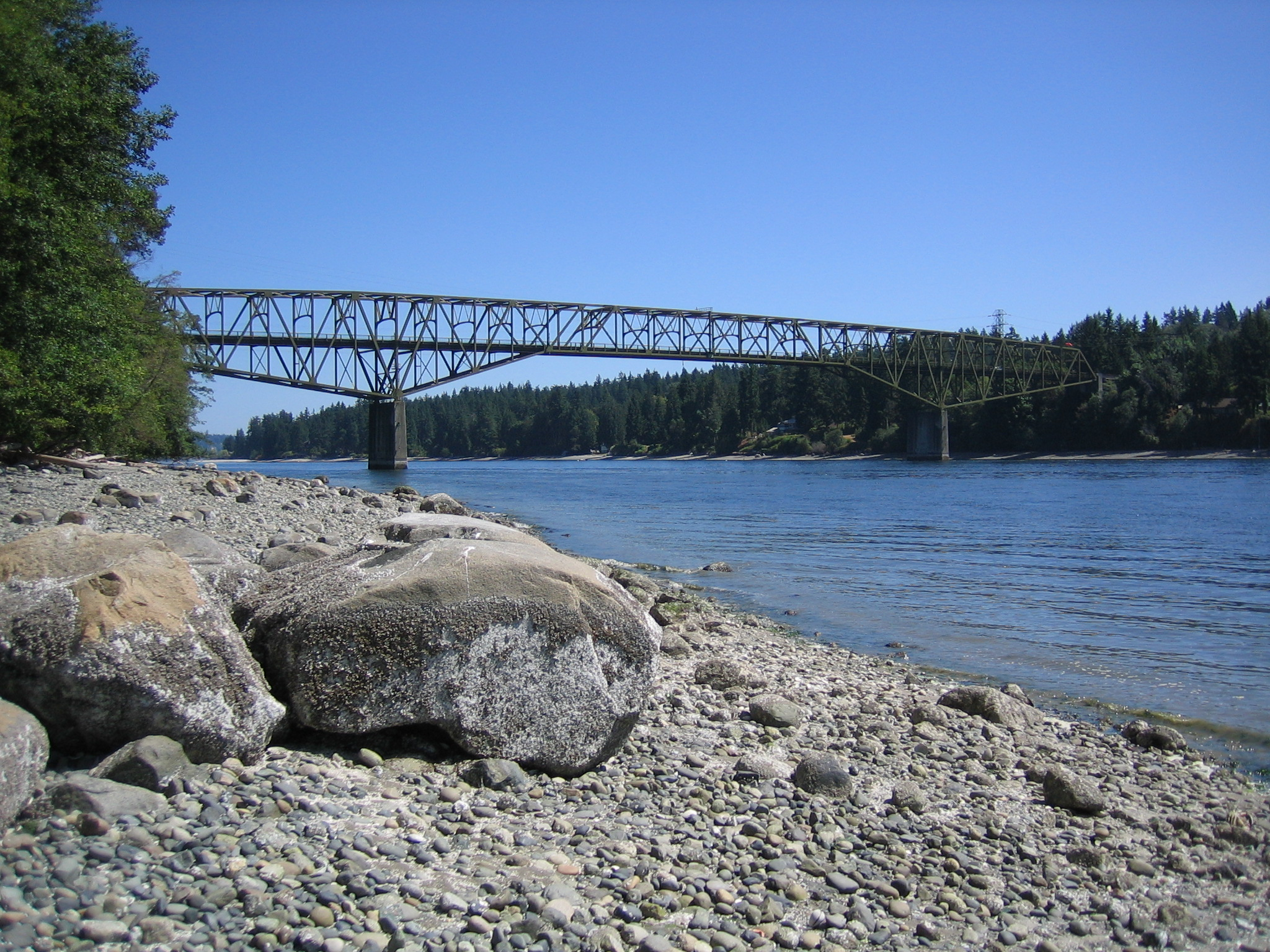
- Coordinates: 47°42′45″N 122°33′58″W
- Carries: SR 305
- Crosses: Agate Pass
- Locale: Suquamish, Washington
- Owner: WSDOT
- Heritage status: NRHP

Characteristics
- Design: Steel cantilever truss
- Material: Steel
- Total length: 1,229 ft (375 m)
- Longest span: 300 feet (91 m)
- Clearance below: 75 feet (23 m)

History
- Construction end: 1950
- Construction cost: $1,351,363

Statistics
- Toll: until October 1, 1951
- Agate Pass Bridge
- U.S. National Register of Historic Places
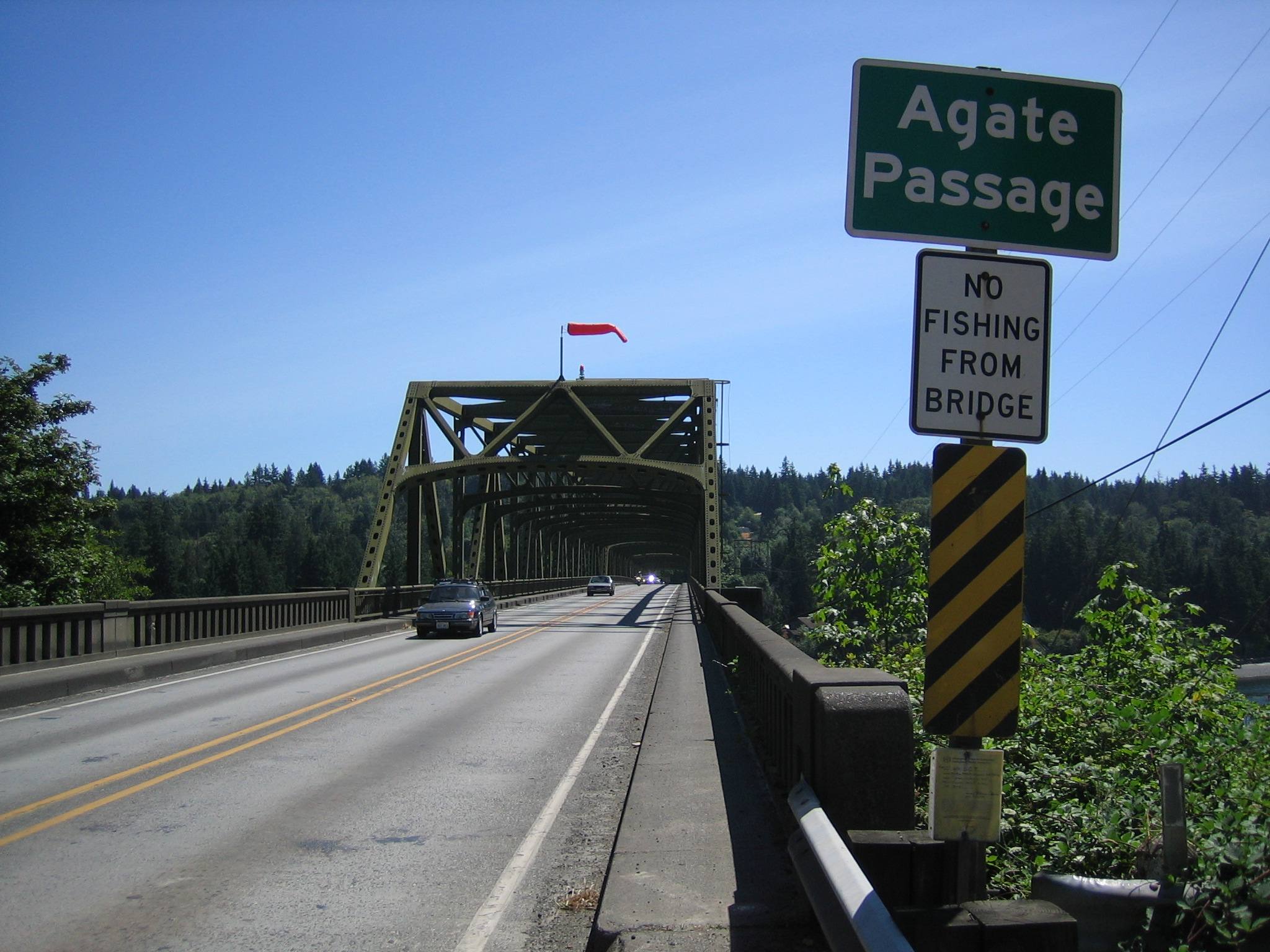
- Location: WA 305 over Agate Passage
- Nearest city: Suquamish, Washington
- Built: 1950
- Architect: State Dept of Hwys
- MPS: Bridges of Washington State MPS
- NRHP reference No.: 95000625
- Added to NRHP: May 24, 1995

Location
- Interactive map of Agate Pass Bridge

The Agate Pass Bridge is a structural steel truss cantilever bridge spanning Agate Pass, connecting Bainbridge Island to the Kitsap Peninsula. It was built in 1950, and it replaced a car ferry service which dated from the 1920s. The bridge provides a direct route along Washington State Route 305 between Seattle, via the Seattle-Bainbridge Island ferry, and the Kitsap Peninsula.

The Agate Pass Bridge is 1,229 feet (375 m) long and is 75 feet (23 m) above the water and has a channel clearance of 300 feet (91 m) between piers.

The original construction cost of $1,351,363 was paid out of the motor vehicle fund, and operated as a toll bridge from October 7, 1950, until October 1, 1951, when costs were repaid by a bond issue passed by the Washington State Legislature. The Washington Toll Bridge Authority managed the bridge during the year it took to repay the bond.

The Agate Pass Bridge is listed on the National Register of Historic Places.
