= Open Architecture Computing Environment =

Open Architecture Computing Environment (OACE) was a specification that aimed to provide a standards-based computing environment in order to decouple computing environment from software applications. It was proposed for the United States Department of Defense in 2004.

== See also ==
- Open architecture
- Mission Data Interface
