= United States Naval Undersea Museum =

Naval museum

- Established: 1995
- Location: Keyport, Washington
- Coordinates: 47.7004°N 122.6249°W
- Type: Maritime museum
- Website: www.navalunderseamuseum.org

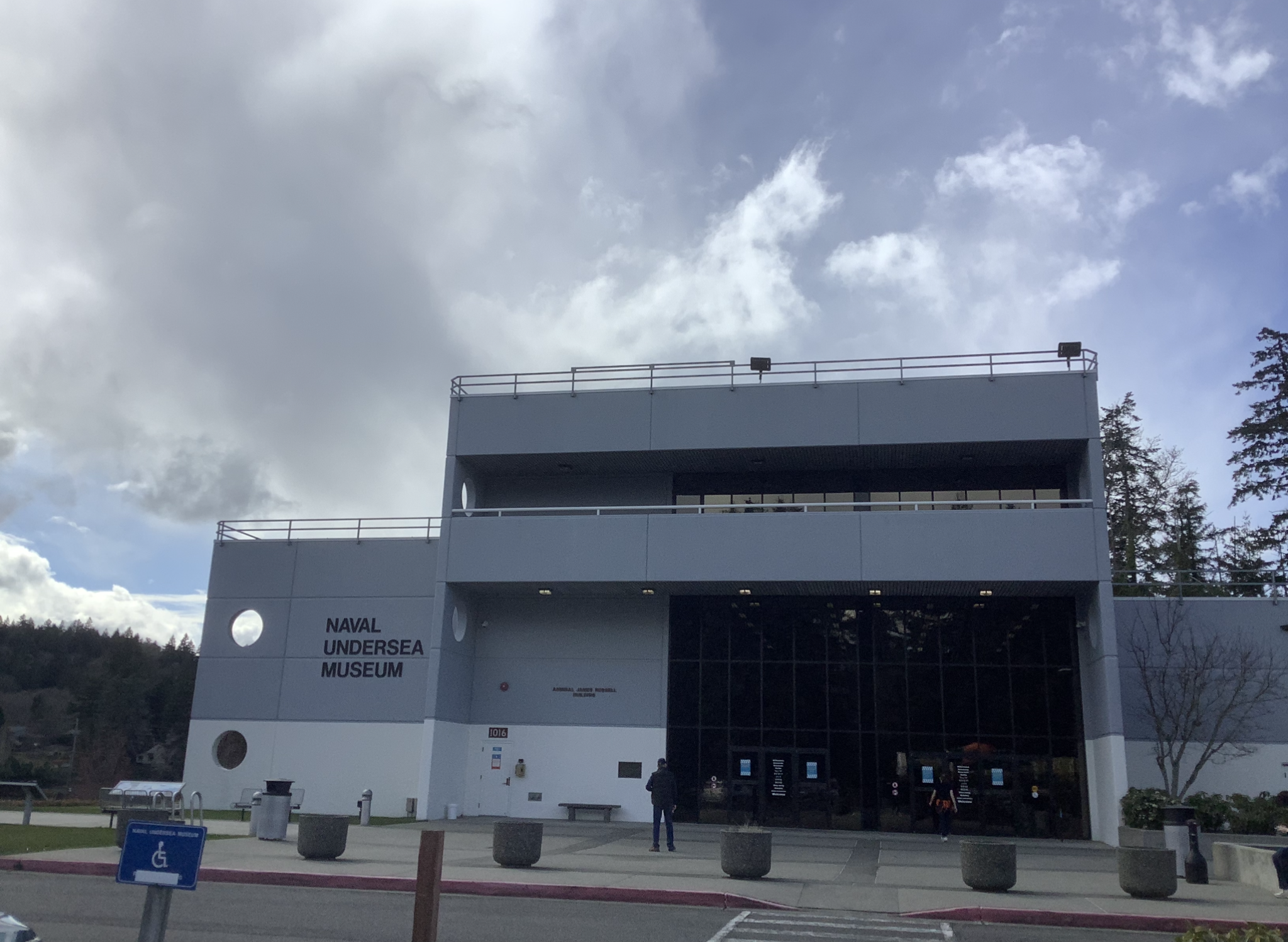
The US Naval Undersea Museum pictured in 2023

The United States Naval Undersea Museum is a naval museum located at Keyport, Washington. It is one of the 10 Navy museums that are operated by the Naval History & Heritage Command. It sits next to a branch of the Naval Undersea Warfare Center.

== History ==
The Naval Undersea Museum Foundation is a 501(c)(3) non-profit Washington State corporation established in 1980 as a philanthropic organization. Through fund-raising efforts of the Foundation, the Naval Undersea Museum and Conference Center complex in Keyport, Washington, opened in 1995.

The Naval Undersea Museum combines naval history, undersea technology, and marine science. This new building, filled with more than 20,000 square feet (1,900 m^{2}) of exhibits, holds the largest collection of naval undersea history and science artifacts in the United States. The museum's research library contains more than 6,500 volumes that support the exhibits and provide extensive information on undersea history, science, and operations. It also holds a complete set of World War II submarine war patrol reports and more than 115 interviews from the U.S. Naval Institute's oral history collection.

The Foundation publishes the Undersea Quarterly and sponsors the Naval Undersea Museum Store. Other educational programs are supported by the Foundation in cooperation with the Naval Undersea Warfare Center, Keyport.

== Collection ==
Exhibits interpret the ocean environment, the development of undersea weapons technology, U.S. submarines, and Navy diving and salvage. Artifacts include U.S. torpedoes from the Whitehead and Howell designs to the modern Mk 48 and Mk 50 weapons, a Confederate mine, torpedo tubes from the ballistic missile submarine USS Tecumseh, and a simulated submarine control room incorporating major equipment from USS Greenling. Some noteworthy items in the Museum collection are the 55-ton sail of the nuclear fast attack submarine USS Sturgeon, the deep submersibles Trieste II and Mystic, the Deep Submergence Rescue Vehicle (DSRV) that was used for the film The Hunt for Red October, and a re-creation of the control room of USS Greenling using the actual equipment and consoles removed from the attack submarine when it was decommissioned. Exhibit themes include the environment of the ocean, torpedoes, naval mine warfare, the technology of submarines, and diving equipment.

== See also ==
- U.S. Navy Museum
- List of maritime museums in the United States
- Naval Undersea Warfare Center
