= Fox Island (Rhode Island) =

Island in Washington County, Rhode Island, United States

Coordinates: 41°33′15″N 71°25′06″W

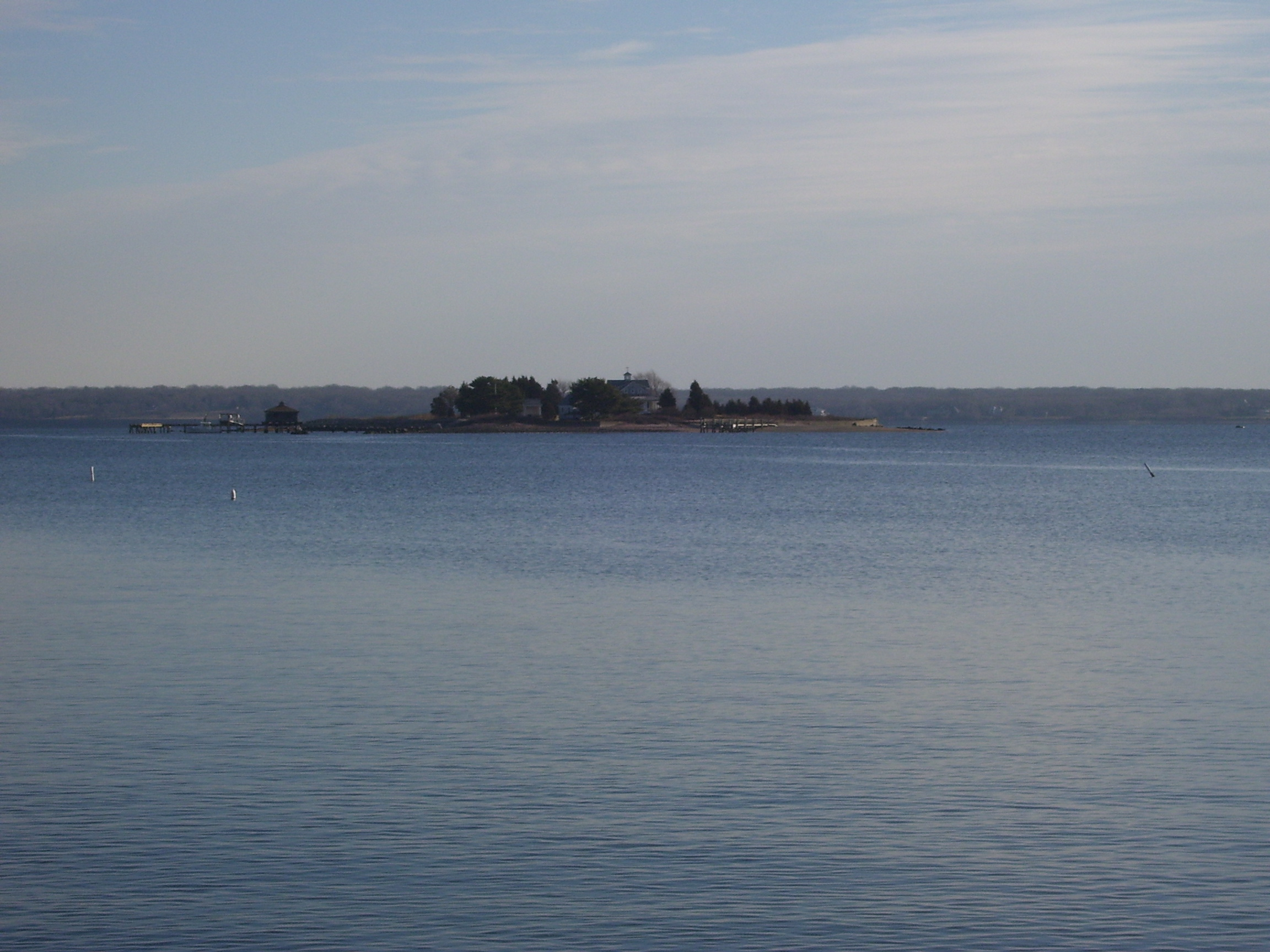
Fox Island in 2008 from North Kingstown

Fox Island is an island in Narragansett Bay, Rhode Island, in the United States of America. It lies between Conanicut Island and North Kingstown just south of the village of Wickford, Rhode Island. The island is a part of the town of North Kingstown. The Native Americans called the island "Nanaquonset" (also "Nonequasset" or "Sonanoxet.") The island was purchased from Native Americans by Randall Holden and Samuel Gorton in 1659. In the 1860s a Christian preacher named Captain Jimmie Hammond became the first full-time resident of the island where he lived with his chickens and cat. In 1880, Rev. William Pendleton Chapman, a pastor at the nearby Quidnessett Church, featured the island in his adventure book titled “Budd Boyd’s Triumph: The Boy Firm of Fox Island.” Various other private owners have owned the island since its first habitation. Since 2000 it has been privately owned by a corporation which uses a large wind generator on the east side of the island.

== References and external links ==
- Sidney Smith Rider, The Lands of Rhode Island: As They Were Known to Caunonicus and Miantunnomu When Roger Williams Came in 1636 (Published by the Author: 1904).
- Frederic Denlson, Narragansett Sea and Shore, (J.A. & R.A. Reid, Providence, RI., 1879)
- George L. Seavey, Rhode Island's Coastal Natural Areas.
