= Poulsbo, Washington =

City in Washington, United States

Poulsbo, Washington č̓uʔč̓uɬac
- City
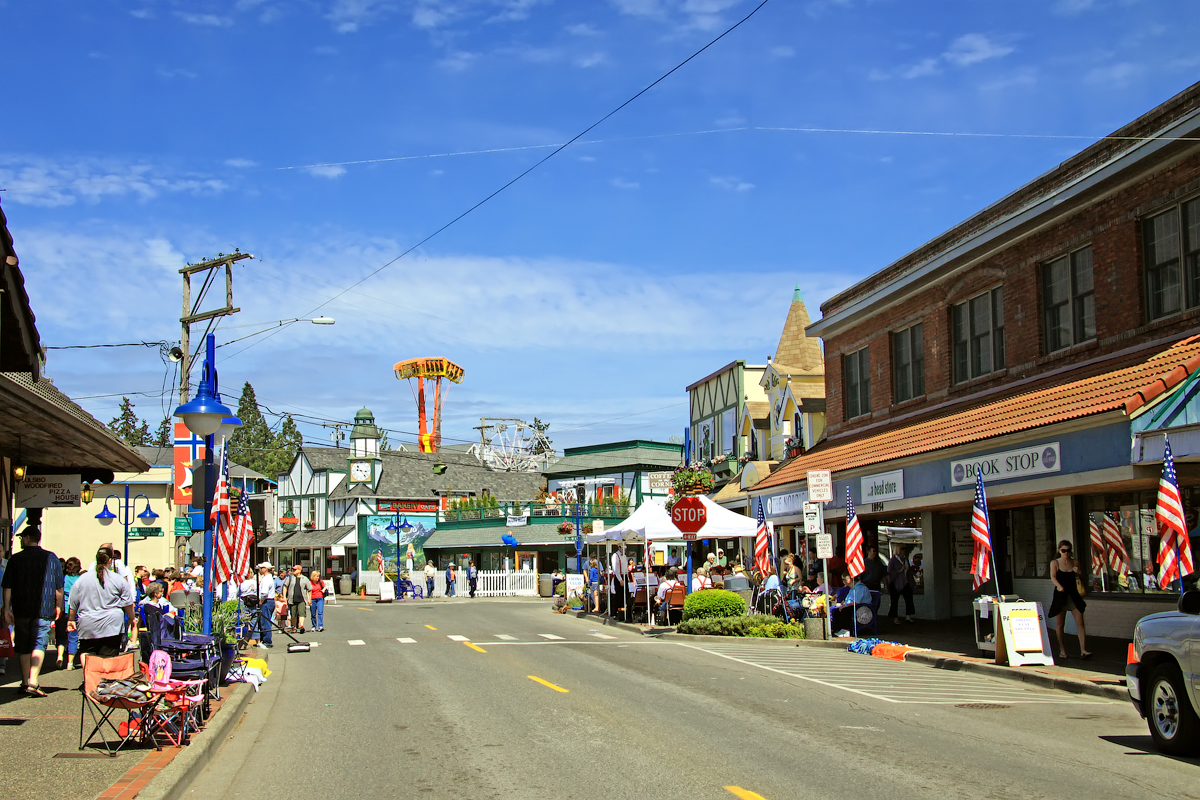
- Front Street Northeast
- Nicknames: Viking City, Little Norway
- Interactive location map of Poulsbo
- Coordinates: 47°44′21″N 122°38′27″W
- Country: United States
- State: Washington
- County: Kitsap

Government
  - Type: Mayor–council
  - Mayor: Ed Stern

Area
  - Total: 5.37 sq mi (13.91 km^{2})
  - Land: 4.74 sq mi (12.27 km^{2})
  - Water: 0.63 sq mi (1.64 km^{2})
- Elevation: 62 ft (19 m)

Population (2020)
  - Total: 11,975
  - Estimate (2022): 11,891
  - Density: 2,357/sq mi (910.2/km^{2})
- Time zone: UTC-8 (Pacific (PST))
  - Summer (DST): UTC-7 (PDT)
- ZIP Code: 98370
- Area code(s): 360, 564
- FIPS code: 53-55995
- GNIS feature ID: 2411479
- Website: poulsbo.gov

Poulsbo (/ˈpɔːlzboʊ/ PAWLZ-boh) is a city on Liberty Bay in Kitsap County, Washington, United States. It is the smallest of the four cities in Kitsap County. The population was 11,970 at the 2020 census and an estimated 10,927 in 2018.

The Suquamish people have inhabited the surrounding area, called č̓uʔč̓uɬac in Lushootseed, for millennia. After the signing of the Treaty of Point Elliott in 1855, many were moved to the Port Madison Indian Reservation. Poulsbo was then founded in the 1880s by Norwegian immigrant Jørgen Eliason, who was joined by other Scandinavians who relocated from the Midwestern states. They were drawn here by the availability of land, by the area's rich resources, and by a landscape similar to their native home. The settlement was connected by boats to other areas of the region, including the Puget Sound mosquito fleet, which was eventually usurped by highways built in the early 20th century.

Modern-day downtown Poulsbo maintains a Scandinavian theme to honor its early immigrant history and is a popular regional tourist destination. One of its local products, Poulsbo Bread, is made locally at Sluys Bakery and used to be sold internationally. Many visitors arrive by boat; there are three marinas near the town, and the town's harbor is an excellent anchorage.

== History ==
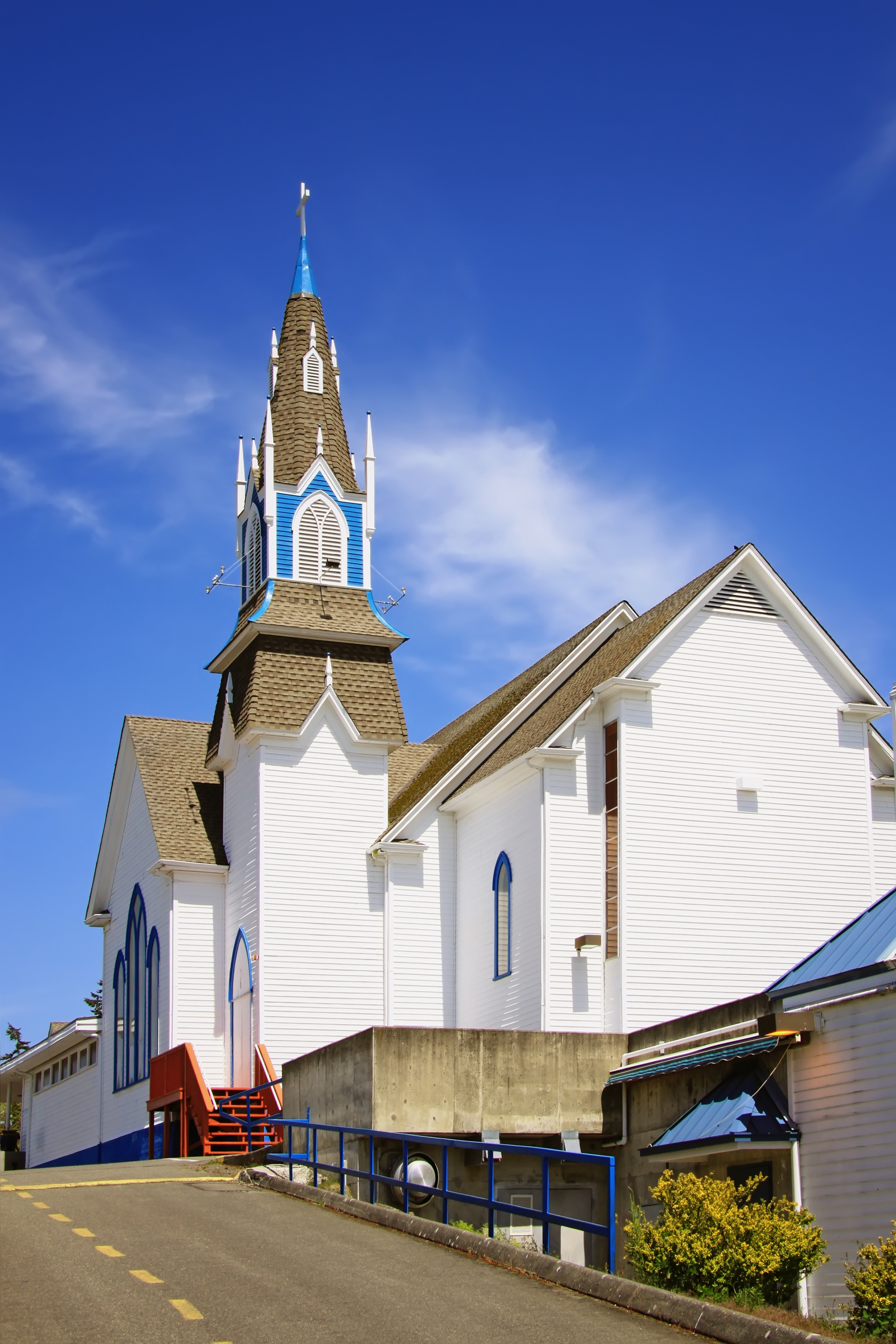
First Lutheran Church of Poulsbo

The Suquamish people have inhabited Liberty Bay for millennia, hunting in local forests and floodplains, fishing in bays and streams, and harvesting shellfish along the shoreline. The site upon which the modern city is built is called č̓uʔč̓uɬac, meaning "maple trees". The Suquamish had a winter village nearby, at the head of Liberty Bay, anglicized variously as "Ho-Cheeb" and "Xoyacid," which consisted of two large houses and four smaller houses. It existed until the late 1800s when settlers began populating the area.

After the signing of the Treaty of Point Elliott in 1855, most of the Suquamish people living in the area were relocated to the Port Madison Indian Reservation.

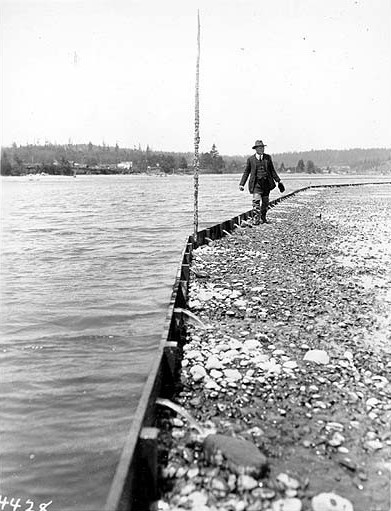
Oyster farming in Poulsbo, 1920

Founded by Norwegian immigrant Jørgen Eliason in the 1880s, Poulsbo was settled in its early years by a large number of Norwegian and other Scandinavian immigrants because of its similarities to their native countries. In 1886, Iver Brynildsen Moe, one of the early Norwegian settlers, suggested that the community should have a post office. Moe suggested the town be named "Paulsbo", his hometown in Halden, Norway. The community's petition for a post office was granted and Moe became the first postmaster, but authorities in Washington, D.C. misspelled the town's name, likely misreading Moe's handwriting, and the community became known as "Poulsbo" thereafter. Poulsbo was incorporated on December 18, 1907.

On September 15, 1914, after a dry summer with multiple previous brush fires, a large portion of the downtown business district was destroyed in a fire. Eight business buildings, an estimated third of the business section, were destroyed, with another damaged. The cause of the fire was never determined. Businessowners who lost their buildings continued business in undamaged buildings while downtown was rebuilt. After the fire, new buildings were constructed with cement rather than wood.

Until World War II, many Poulsbo residents retained Norwegian as a primary language. However, during World War II, the military constructed about 300 residential units to provide housing for workers at the nearby Puget Sound Naval Shipyard in Bremerton. The population of Poulsbo almost tripled over three years, and the diversification of the population led to the dominance of English as the primary language.

On October 22, 1975, King Olav V of Norway visited Poulsbo as part of the celebration of 150 years of Norwegian immigration to the United States. His son, Harald, visited 20 years later.

== Education ==
Poulsbo is home to many different public schools in the North Kitsap School District. North Kitsap High School, Poulsbo Middle School, Poulsbo Elementary School and Vinland Elementary School are located within the city limits, while Pearson Elementary School lies south of town. Private schools include Gateway Christian School and West Sound Academy. Post-secondary undergraduate education includes Olympic College Poulsbo.

Chief Kitsap Academy in Suquamish is outside of the Poulsbo city limits and has a Poulsbo postal address.

Northwest College of Art & Design was formerly in the Poulsbo area. The school, established in 1982 as the Northwest College of Art, was initially located in the Lemolo neighbor of Poulsbo. In 1991 the institution began leasing the former Mains Manor in Suquamish, which was purchased in 2000. The Suquamish tribe had purchased the former college building for $5.03 million on November 28, 2017, and made it into the current Chief Kitsap Building. The college, at that time, moved to Tacoma, having purchased a building there.

== Geography ==
=== Topography ===
Poulsbo is located in northern Kitsap County at the north end of Liberty Bay, a sheltered arm of Puget Sound. Washington State Route 305 has its northwestern terminus in the northern part of the town at State Route 3 and leads southeast 13 miles (21 km) to the ferry docks at Bainbridge Island. SR 3 leads north 9 miles (14 km) to Port Gamble and south 16 miles (26 km) to the western part of Bremerton.

According to the United States Census Bureau, Poulsbo has a total area of 5.27 square miles (13.65 km^{2}), of which 4.67 square miles (12.10 km^{2}) are land and 0.60 square miles (1.55 km^{2}), or 11.43%, are water.

=== Climate ===
Climate data for Poulsbo, Washington
Month	Jan	Feb	Mar	Apr	May	Jun	Jul	Aug	Sep	Oct	Nov	Dec	Year
Record high °F (°C)	62 (17)	71 (22)	80 (27)	83 (28)	92 (33)	97 (36)	99 (37)	101 (38)	97 (36)	86 (30)	70 (21)	68 (20)	101 (38)
Mean daily maximum °F (°C)	47 (8)	49 (9)	54 (12)	59 (15)	65 (18)	70 (21)	76 (24)	77 (25)	71 (22)	60 (16)	51 (11)	45 (7)	60 (16)
Mean daily minimum °F (°C)	36 (2)	35 (2)	38 (3)	41 (5)	46 (8)	51 (11)	54 (12)	55 (13)	50 (10)	44 (7)	39 (4)	34 (1)	44 (7)
Record low °F (°C)	12 (−11)	12 (−11)	19 (−7)	28 (−2)	27 (−3)	38 (3)	41 (5)	39 (4)	33 (1)	27 (−3)	10 (−12)	7 (−14)	7 (−14)
Average precipitation inches (mm)	8.89 (226)	6.22 (158)	5.95 (151)	3.57 (91)	2.46 (62)	1.69 (43)	0.86 (22)	1.03 (26)	1.55 (39)	4.89 (124)	9.39 (239)	10.07 (256)	56.57 (1,437)

== Economy ==
=== Employment ===
As of 2024, Poulsbo had an unemployment rate of 4.6% and 7,875 total employees; the top employers were:

Rank	Employer	Employees in 2024	Employees in 2015	2024 Share	2015 Share
1	North Kitsap School District	▲857	826	▼10.88%	13.05%
2	Martha & Mary Health Services	▼372	565	▼4.72%	8.93%
3	Walmart	▼325	336	▼4.13%	5.31%
4	Town & Country Market	▼233	240	▼2.96%	3.79%
5	Watson Furniture Group	▲225	-	▲2.86%	-
6	Gateway Fellowship & School / Christ Memorial Children's Learning Center	▲197	152	▲2.50%	2.40%
7	Safeway / Albertsons	▲170	115	▲2.16%	1.82%
8	Home Depot	▲125	96	▲1.59%	1.52%
9	City of Poulsbo	▲110	90	▼1.40%	1.42%
10	Liberty Shores / Harbor House	▲105	102	▼1.33%	1.61%

== Demographics ==
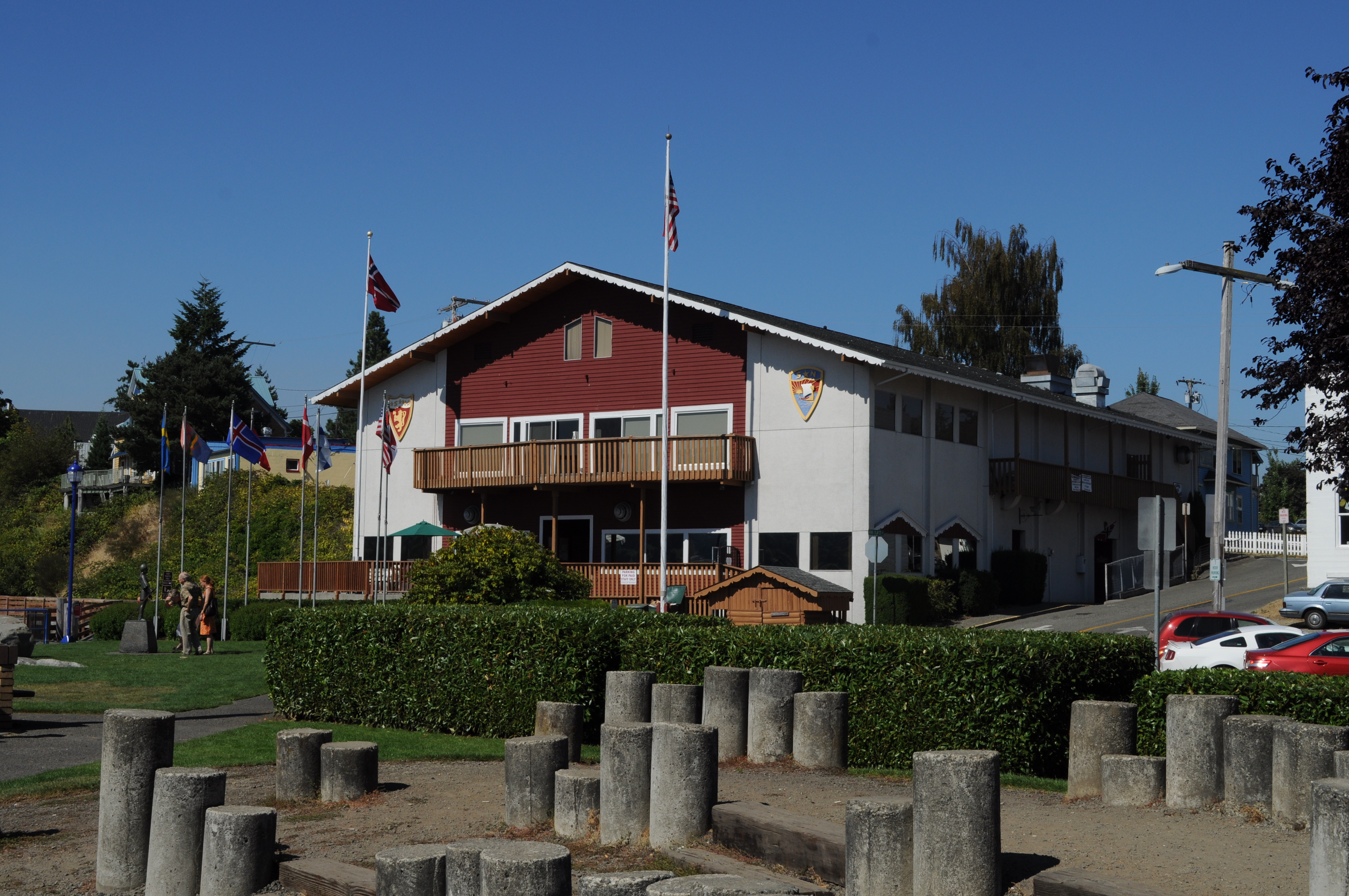
Sons of Norway Hall, Poulsbo

Historical population
Census	Pop.	Note	%±
1910	364		—
1920	546		50.0%
1930	584		7.0%
1940	639		9.4%
1950	1,014		58.7%
1960	1,505		48.4%
1970	1,856		23.3%
1980	3,453		86.0%
1990	4,848		40.4%
2000	6,813		40.5%
2010	9,200		35.0%
2020	11,975		30.2%
U.S. Decennial Census

=== 2020 census ===
As of the 2020 census, Poulsbo had a population of 11,975. The median age was 41.8 years, with 20.2% of residents under the age of 18 and 22.3% of residents aged 65 years or older. For every 100 females there were 86.9 males, and for every 100 females age 18 and over there were 84.8 males age 18 and over.

99.9% of residents lived in urban areas, while 0.1% lived in rural areas.

There were 4,891 households in Poulsbo, of which 28.8% had children under the age of 18 living in them. Of all households, 48.9% were married-couple households, 15.8% were households with a male householder and no spouse or partner present, and 29.6% were households with a female householder and no spouse or partner present. About 31.0% of all households were made up of individuals and 16.2% had someone living alone who was 65 years of age or older.

There were 5,116 housing units, of which 4.4% were vacant. The homeowner vacancy rate was 0.7% and the rental vacancy rate was 3.7%.

Racial composition as of the 2020 census
Race	Number	Percent
White	9,178	76.6%
Black or African American	187	1.6%
American Indian and Alaska Native	111	0.9%
Asian	701	5.9%
Native Hawaiian and Other Pacific Islander	53	0.4%
Some other race	392	3.3%
Two or more races	1,353	11.3%
Hispanic or Latino (of any race)	1,159	9.7%

=== 2010 census ===
As of the 2010 census, there were 9,200 people, 3,883 households, and 2,310 families residing in the city. The population density was 1,970.0 inhabitants per square mile (760.6/km^{2}). There were 4,115 housing units at an average density of 881.2 per square mile (340.2/km^{2}). The racial makeup of the city was 82.9% White, 9.2% Hispanic or Latino, 5.7% Asian, 1.1% African American, 0.9% Native American, 0.3% Pacific Islander, 3.6% from other races, and 5.4% from two or more races.

There were 3,883 households, of which 30.8% had children under the age of 18 living with them, 61% were married couples living together, 11.4% had a female householder with no husband present, 3.2% had a male householder with no wife present, and 40.5% were non-families. 34.7% of all households were made up of individuals, and 17.4% had someone living alone who was 65 years of age or older. The average household size was 2.30 and the average family size was 2.97.

The median age in the city was 40.2 years. 23.8% of residents were under the age of 18; 7.8% were between the ages of 18 and 24; 24.7% were from 25 to 44; 24.5% were from 45 to 64; and 19.4% were 65 years of age or older. The gender makeup of the city was 45.3% male and 54.7% female.

=== 2000 census ===
As of the 2000 census, there were 6,813 people, 2,845 households, and 1,772 families residing in the city. The population density was 2,121.5 people per square mile (819.5/km^{2}). There were 2,992 housing units at an average density of 931.7 per square mile (359.9/km^{2}). The racial makeup of the city was 88.1% White, 4.8% Hispanic or Latino, 3.0% Asian, 1.0% African American, 1.0% Native American, 0.4% Pacific Islander, 1.9% from other races, and 4.6% from two or more races. 14.6% were of German, 10.6% Irish, 10.0% English and 9.5% Norwegian ancestry. 95.3% spoke English and 2.6% Spanish as their first language.

There were 2,845 households, out of which 30.9% had children under the age of 18 living with them, 48.6% were married couples living together, 10.9% had a female householder with no husband present, and 37.7% were non-families. 32.1% of all households were made up of individuals, and 15.8% had someone living alone who was 65 years of age or older. The average household size was 2.30 and the average family size was 2.92.

In the city, the population was spread out, with 24.2% under the age of 18, 7.5% from 18 to 24, 26.8% from 25 to 44, 22.1% from 45 to 64, and 19.5% who were 65 years of age or older. The median age was 39 years. For every 100 females, there were 86.7 males. For every 100 females age 18 and under, there are 78.7 males.

The median income for a household in the city was $38,875 and the median income for a family was $51,353. Males had a median income of $40,482 versus $27,899 for females. The per capita income for the city was $20,649. 9.1% of the population and 8.2% of families were below the poverty line. Out of the total population, 14.1% of those under the age of 18 and 6.0% of those 65 and older were living below the poverty line. A large number of employed individuals work on the east side of Puget Sound, in Seattle or other King County cities, and commute to work by ferry.

== Government ==
Poulsbo has a mayor–council government that is led by an elected mayor and seven-member city council. Ed Stern was elected mayor in 2025. The position became a part-time position on January 1, 2026, with duties transferred to a hired city administrator. A proposal to move Poulsbo to a council–manager government was rejected by 60 percent of voters in a 2001 special election.

== Culture ==
=== Media ===
The North Kitsap Herald has published continuously since 1901, providing local news for Poulsbo as well as the greater Kitsap County area. The Herald was founded by Peter Iverson, who served as mayor of Poulsbo and state legislator. Today, the Herald is owned by Sound Publishing. In Kitsap, Sound also publishes the Bainbridge Island Review, Central Kitsap Reporter, and Port Orchard Independent (Fridays); Kingston Community News (monthly); as well as KitsapDailyNews.com and BainbridgeReview.com (daily online).

=== Landmarks ===
First Lutheran Church opened in 1886 atop the hill, overlooking downtown Poulsbo, and was originally Førdefjord Lutheran.

==== Norseman statue ====
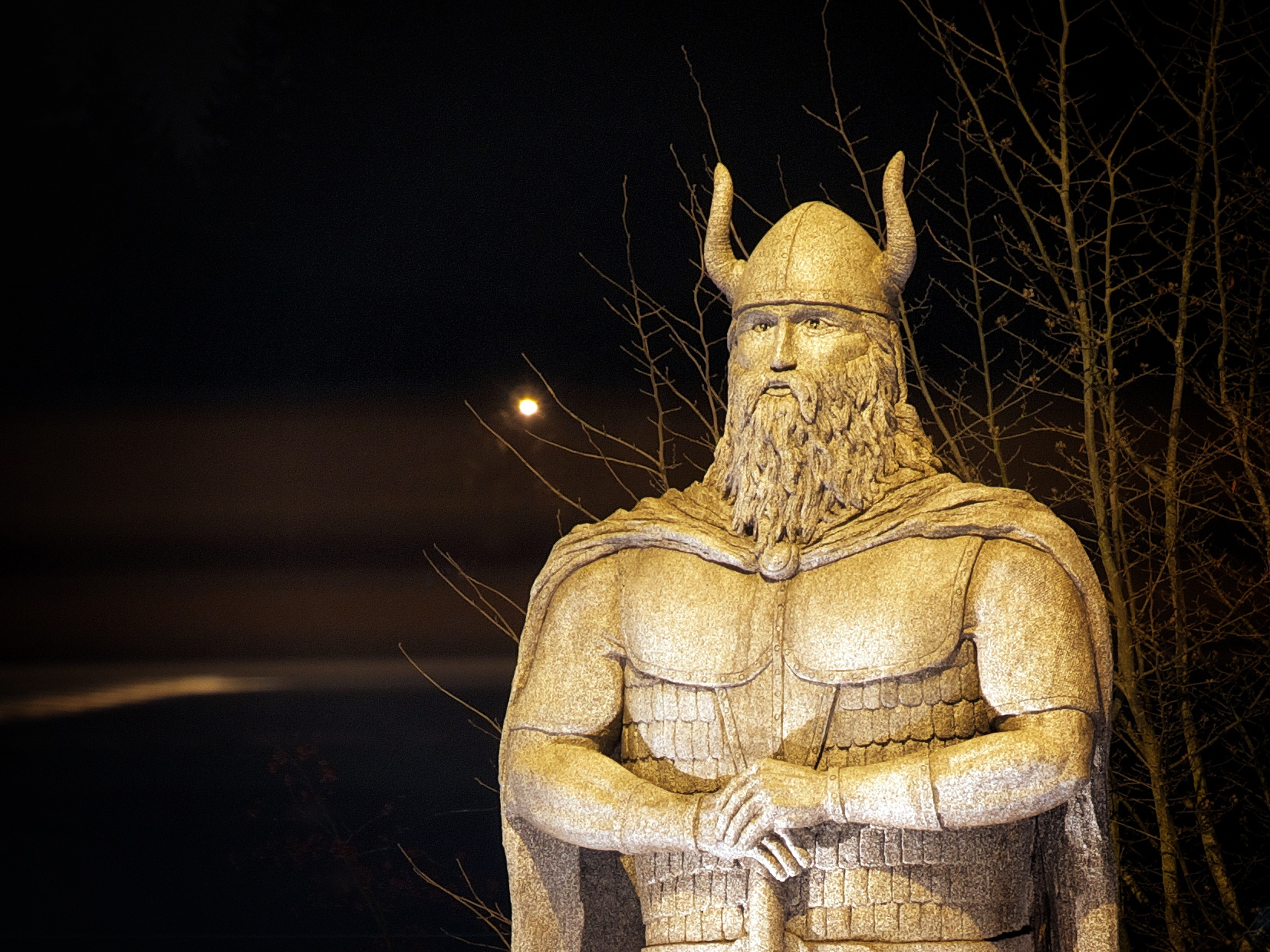
The Norseman is a 12-foot Viking statue made of steel and concrete by artist Mark Gale of Tacoma. The statue sits at the southeast corner of the Viking Avenue-Lindvig Way.

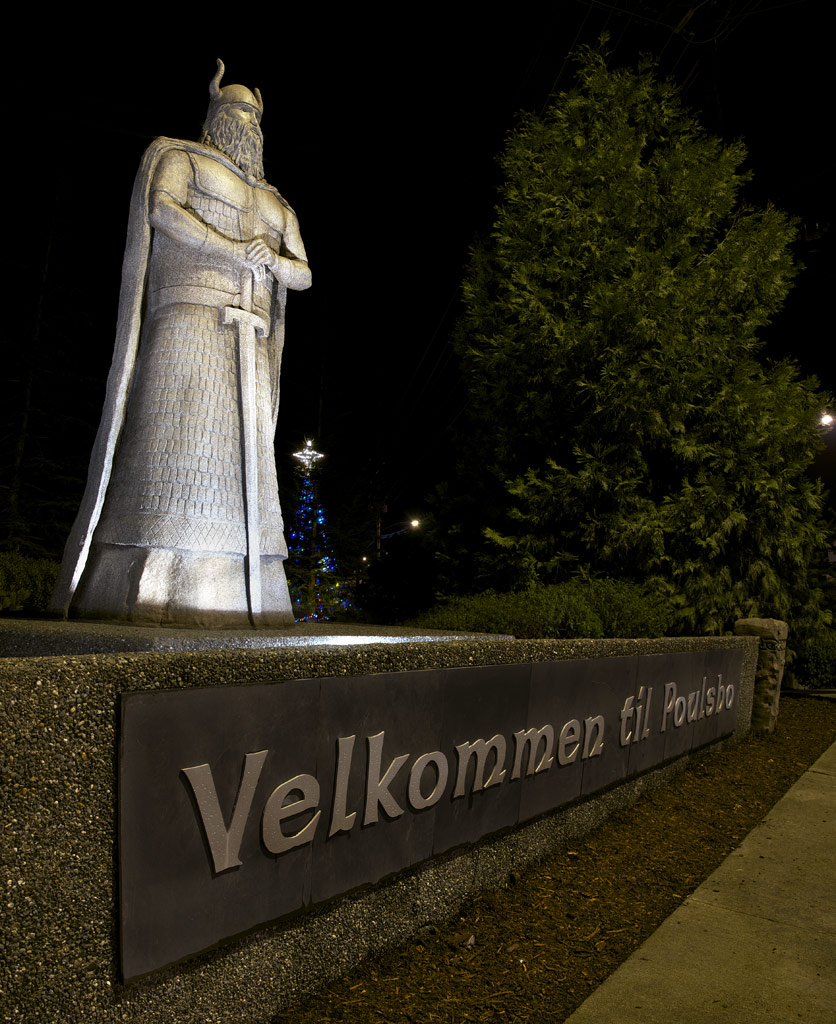
Velkommen til Poulsbo

The Norseman Statue (47.74719°N 122.65469°W), a 12-foot (3.7 m) statue by artist Mark Gale of Tacoma, stands at Viking Avenue and Lindvig Way.

The statue was commissioned by the city to replace a wooden sign at Viking Avenue and Lindvig Way. The statue was created by Tacoma, Washington-based artist Mark Gale. The project was coordinated by local businessman Bill Austin and Poulsbo Mayor Becky Erickson. Privately funded by the Bjorgen Beautification Fund, the statue cost $25,000. It was unveiled on November 23, 2012, at a traditional city tree lighting ceremony.

The statue constitutes 500 pounds of rebar steel and 5,000 pounds of cement. It stands on a foundation engraved with the words Velkommen til Poulsbo (translating to "Welcome to Poulsbo" from Norwegian). It is located on the western edge of town, on the southeast corner of Viking Avenue NW and NW Lindvig Way.

=== Parks ===
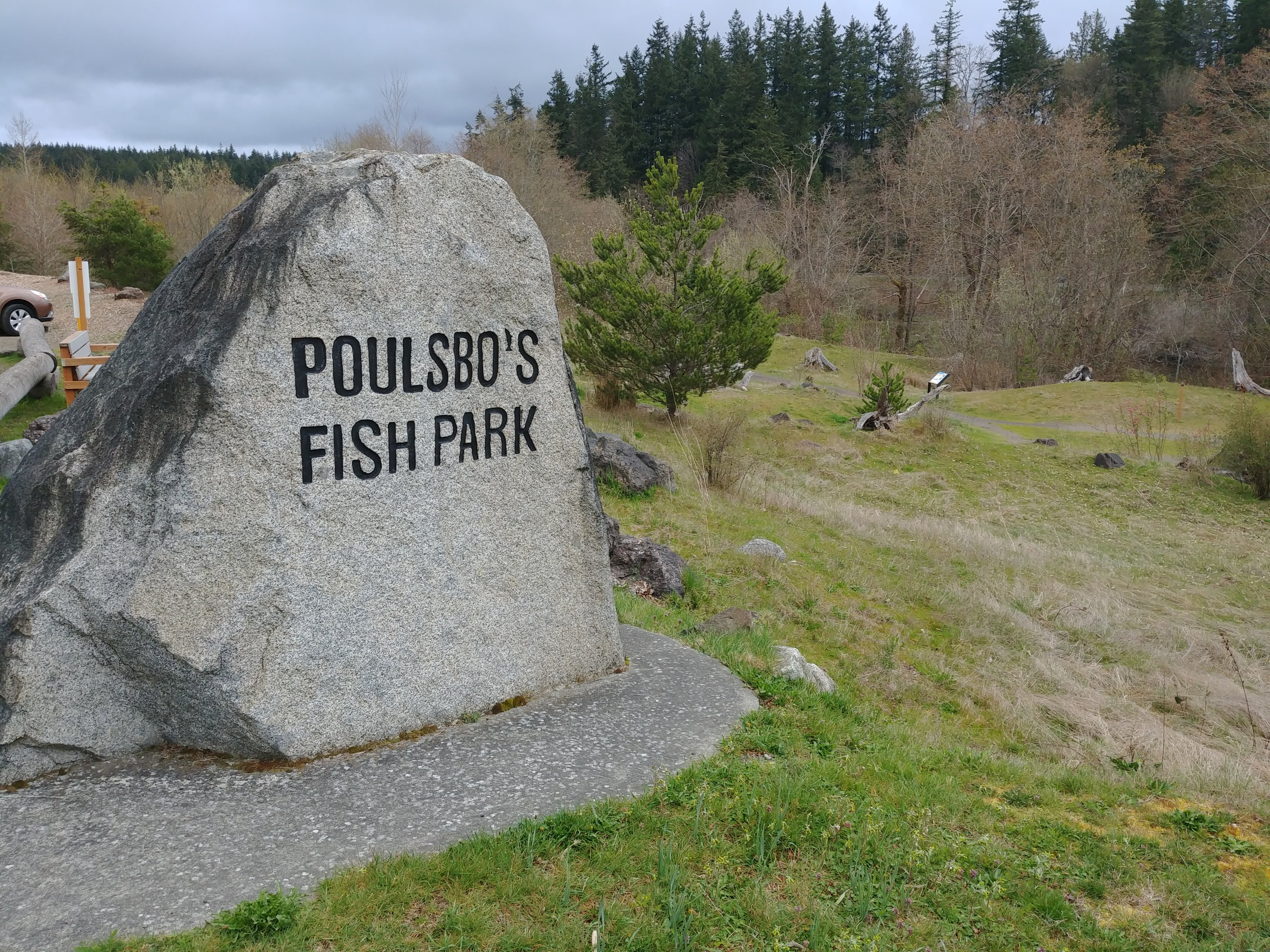
Entrance to Poulsbo's Fish Park

Poulsbo's Fish Park (47°44.862′N 122°39.190′W) is a 40-acre (16 ha) park in Poulsbo. The park was started in 2002 by a group of community members and governments including the City of Poulsbo and the Suquamish Tribe.

The park is centered on the Dogfish Creek estuary at the north end of Liberty Bay. As of 2015, the park had 1.5 miles (2.4 km) of trails, with the city planning to double that figure.

During the fall salmon run, Washington State University's extension service conducts salmon tours at locations on Kitsap Peninsula including Fish Park.

== Notable residents ==
- Tarn Adams — creator of Dwarf Fortress
- Margaret Olofsson Bergman — weaver
- Jack Colletto — American football player
- James W. Douglass — author, peace activist, and Gandhian nonviolent Christian theologian
- Jason Everman — former member of Nirvana; U.S. Army Special Forces
- Richard F. Gordon Jr. — Apollo 12 astronaut
- Aaron Sele — Major League Baseball pitcher
- Scott Shipley — Olympic canoeing medalist
- Harland Svare —former NFL player and coach
- Ryan Villopoto — pro motocross rider

== Transportation ==
- SR 3
- SR 305
- SR 307

== Sister cities ==
Poulsbo has two sister cities, both in Norway:

- (Norway) Kautokeino Municipality
- (Norway) Namsos Municipality
