= Bangor Base, Washington =

- Census-designated place
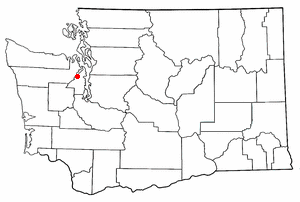
- Coordinates: 47°44′27″N 122°42′42″W
- Country: United States
- State: Washington
- County: Kitsap

Area
  - Total: 11.14 sq mi (28.84 km^{2})
  - Land: 11.11 sq mi (28.77 km^{2})
  - Water: 0.031 sq mi (0.08 km^{2})
- Elevation: 364 ft (111 m)

Population (2020)
  - Total: 5,482
  - Density: 493.5/sq mi (190.5/km^{2})
- Time zone: Pacific
- Area code: 360
- FIPS code: 53-04100
- GNIS feature ID: 2407795

Bangor Base is a census-designated place (CDP) in Kitsap County, Washington, within U.S. Naval Base Kitsap on the Kitsap Peninsula. Its population was 5,482 at the 2020 census.

== Geography ==
Bangor is located north of the center of Kitsap County on Hood Canal northwest of Silverdale. It is 15 miles (24 km) north-northwest of Bremerton and 21 miles (34 km) by road west-northwest of Bainbridge Island.

According to the United States Census Bureau, the CDP has a total area of 11.1 square miles (28.8 km^{2}), of which 0.03 square miles (0.08 km^{2}), or 0.26%, is water.

== Demographics ==
Historical population
Census	Pop.	Note	%±
1990	3,702		—
2000	7,253		95.9%
2010	6,054		−16.5%
2020	5,482		−9.4%
U.S. Decennial Census; 1970 1980 1990; 2000 2010 2020

Bangor Base first appeared as a census designated place under the name Bangor Trident Base in the 1990 U.S. census; the name was changed to Bangor Base for the 2010 U.S. census.

=== Racial and ethnic composition ===
Bangor Base CDP, Washington – Racial and ethnic composition Note: the US Census treats Hispanic/Latino as an ethnic category. This table excludes Latinos from the racial categories and assigns them to a separate category. Hispanics/Latinos may be of any race.
Race / Ethnicity (NH = Non-Hispanic)	Pop 2000	Pop 2010	Pop 2020	% 2000	% 2010	% 2020
White alone (NH)	5,219	4,210	3,265	71.96%	69.54%	59.56%
Black or African American alone (NH)	561	434	494	7.73%	7.17%	9.01%
Native American or Alaska Native alone (NH)	81	40	34	1.12%	0.66%	0.62%
Asian alone (NH)	331	173	208	4.56%	2.86%	3.79%
Native Hawaiian or Pacific Islander alone (NH)	48	26	32	0.66%	0.43%	0.58%
Other race alone (NH)	23	12	29	0.32%	0.20%	0.53%
Mixed race or Multiracial (NH)	247	330	418	3.41%	5.45%	7.62%
Hispanic or Latino (any race)	743	829	1,002	10.24%	13.69%	18.28%
Total	7,253	6,054	5,482	100.00%	100.00%	100.00%

=== 2000 census ===
At the 2000 census, there were 7,253 people, 1,282 households, and 1,275 families in the CDP. The population density is 657.1/mi^{2} (253.7/km^{2}). There were 1,316 housing units at an average density of 46.0/km^{2} (119.2/mi^{2}). The racial makeup of the CDP was 76.7% White, 8.1% African American, 1.3% Native American, 4.7% Asian, 0.8% Pacific Islander, 3.9% from other races, and 4.6% from two or more races. Hispanic or Latino of any race were 10.2% of the population.

Of the 1,282 households 79.8% had children under the age of 18 living with them, 93.4% were married couples living together, 4.4% had a female householder with no husband present, and 0.5% were non-families. 0.4% of households were made up of individuals. The average household size was 3.55 and the average family size was 3.54.

The age distribution was 27.5% under the age of 18, 23.4% from 18 to 24, 47.1% from 25 to 44, 2.0% from 45 to 64, and 0.1% 65 or older. The median age was 25 years. For every 100 females, there were 198.0 males. For every 100 females age 18 and over, there were 263.1 males.

The median income for a household in the CDP was $32,246, and the median family income was $32,105. Males had a median income of $28,856 versus $21,000 for females. The per capita income in the CDP was $16,383. About 8.5% of families and 9.8% of the population were below the poverty line, including 12.4% of those under the age of 18 and none ages 65 or older.
