= Car boot sale =

Form of market

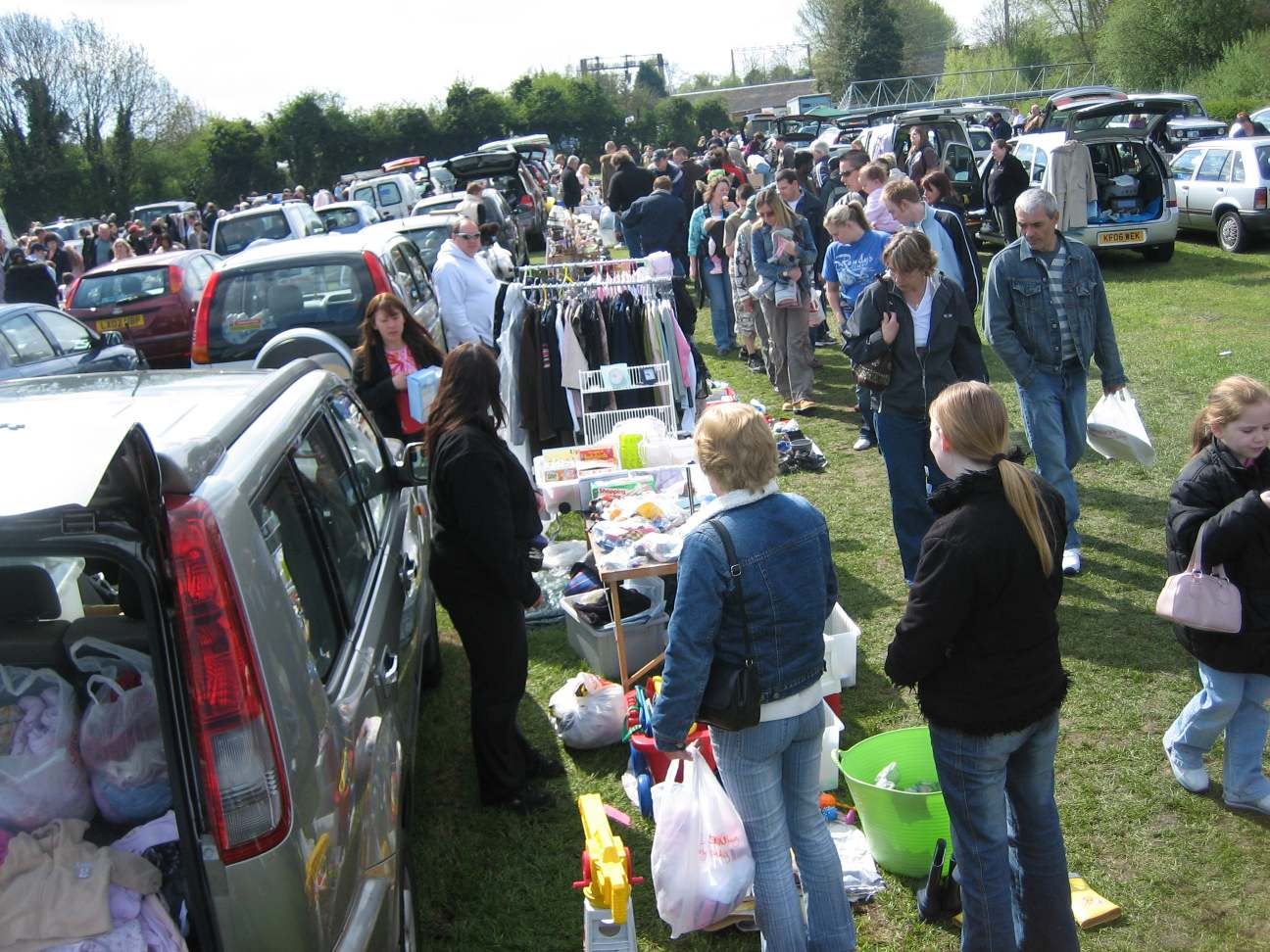
Car boot sale at Apsley, Hertfordshire

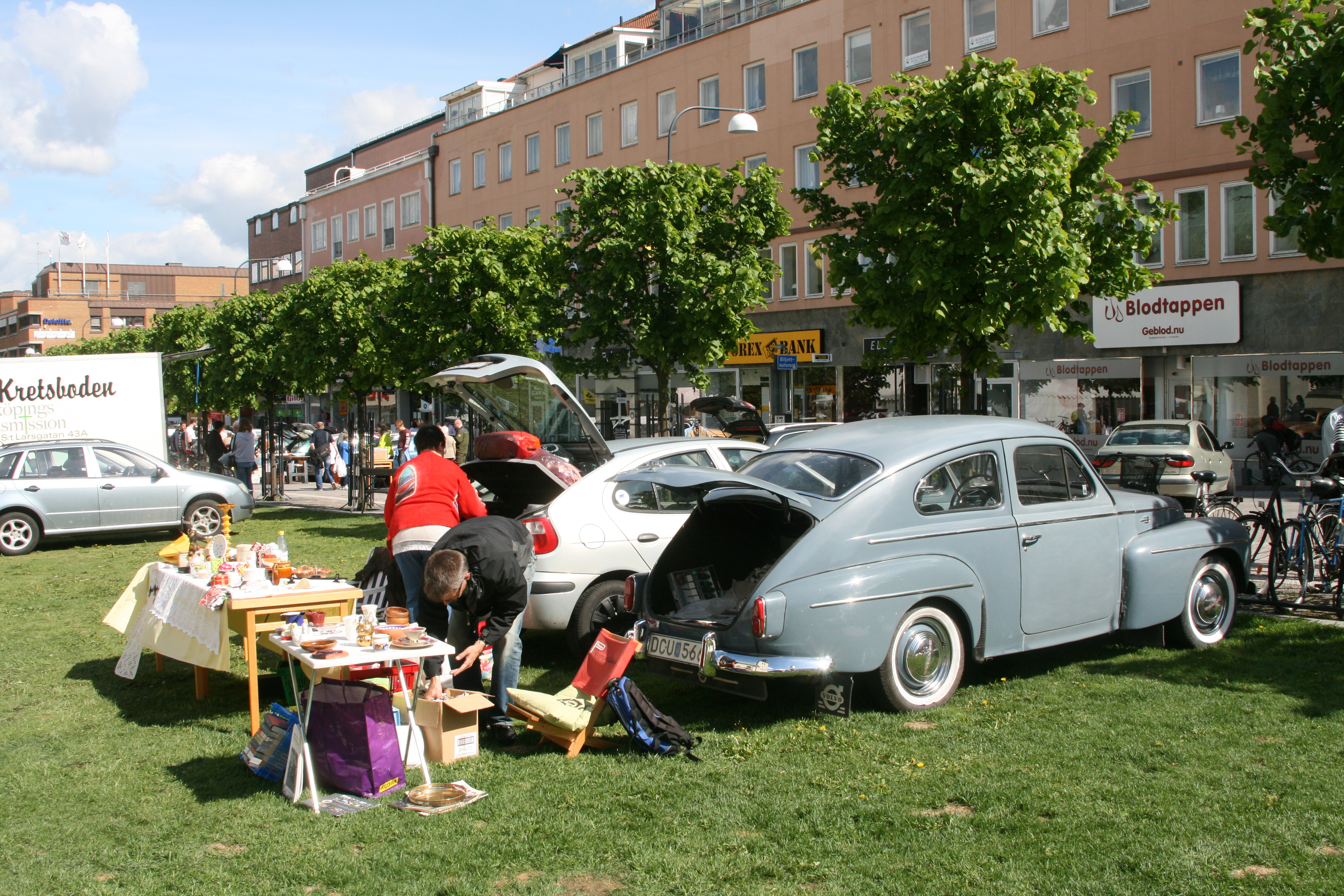
Car boot sale in Sweden

A car boot sale or boot fair is a form of market at which individuals sell household goods and other personal belongings. The term refers to the selling of items from the boot, or trunk, of a car. While some sellers at car boot sales are professional traders, most of the goods on sale are used personal possessions sold by private individuals. A wide variety of items are sold, including antiques and collectables, as in a flea market.

Car boot sales are popular in the United Kingdom, where they are often referred to simply as "car boots", and also in parts of Australia and mainland Europe.

Outdoor car boot sales typically take place during the summer, but indoor boot sales and all-year hard-standing outdoor boot sales are now appearing in some parts of the UK.

The rotation of surplus household stock at car boot sales reduces waste and promotes frugality.

== Locations ==
Car boot sales are held in a variety of locations, including the grounds of schools and other community buildings, or in grass fields or car parks. Usually they take place at a weekend, often on a Sunday. Sellers will typically pay a small fee for their pitch and arrive with their goods in the boot of their car. Usually the items are then unpacked onto folding trestle tables, a blanket or tarpaulin, or the ground. Entry to the general public is usually free, although sometimes a small admission charge is made. Advertised opening times are often not strictly adhered to: often the nature of the venue makes it impossible to prevent keen bargain hunters from wandering in as soon as the first stallholders arrive.

== History ==
It has been said that Father Harry Clarke, a Catholic priest from Stockport, introduced the car boot sale to the UK as a charity fundraiser, after seeing a similar event or trunk fair in Canada, while on holiday there in the early 1970s. Despite the fact that no original source for this has been verified, the story continues to be told. There are now large numbers of regular car boot sales across the UK.

An alternative or complementary history is that the world's first commercial "Grand Boot Fair and Car Boot Sale", or at least the first in the south of England, was held at Nepicar Farm, Wrotham Heath in Kent, England, on 20 September 1980; 200 stalls and 2000 members of the public turned up despite inclement weather. The title or name 'Boot Fair' was coined by one of the originators and organisers, Barry Peverett, in order to create the curiosity that ultimately ensured that car boot sale events became a run-away popular success and a burgeoning nationwide weekend activity. Barry Peverett was an antique dealer from Maidstone. His wife had visited the USA on a visit to her brother and had encountered "trunk sales" whilst there. As an antique dealer who regularly attended antique fairs Peverett saw the potential of bringing this idea to the UK ultimately organising the first large non charity boot fair at Nepicar farm in Kent in September 1980 with fellow organisers Harold Woolley and John Powell. Peverett ran successful boot fairs using the name Rainbow events across Kent in locations such as the Stour centre in Ashford and Maidstone Market amongst many others.

== Online ==
In the 2000s, various "car boot sales" websites were established. These tend to be popular in winter when there are fewer normal outdoor car boot sales.

== Safeguards ==
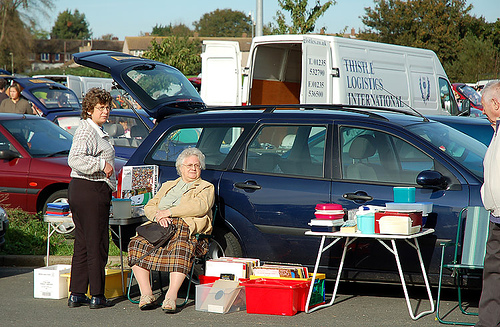
Car boot sale in 2011

In 2008, a national charter, Real Deal: Working Together For Fake-Free Markets, was launched by the Trading Standards Institute in England. It is intended to help local authority Trading Standards staff, market operators and copyright owners. By signing up to the charter, a market operator commits to work closely with Trading Standards to prevent the sale of counterfeit and other illegal goods, and to be aware of who is trading at the market. Trading Standards will, in return, commit to support the market operator and provide information to them in relation to the sale of infringing products.

Guarantees are rarely sought or given at car boot sales and electrical items can rarely be tested at the sale site. Although tracing a seller can be difficult, in the UK they are still obliged to abide by the Trade Descriptions Act.

== See also ==
- Sales (market fairs):
  - Bazaar
  - Charity shop (thrift store)
  - Flea market
  - Garage sale (yard sale)
  - Give-away shop
  - Jumble sale
- Networks facilitating trading of used goods:
  - Buy Nothing Project
  - The Freecycle Network
