= Bainbridge Island, Washington =

- City
- City of Bainbridge Island
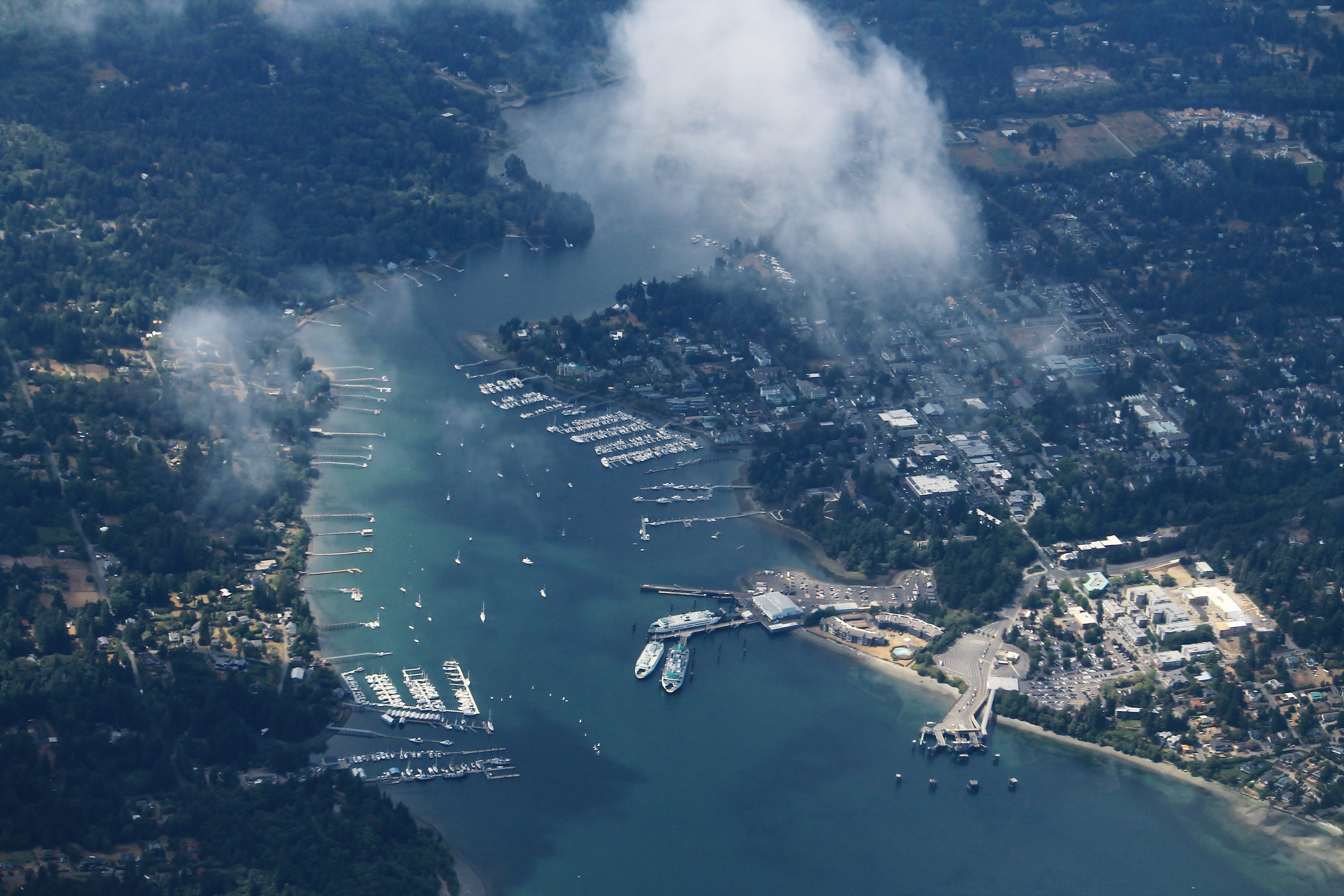
- Aerial view of Bainbridge Island

- Flag Seal Logo

- Location of Bainbridge Island, Washington

- Location within Washington (state) Location within the United States Location within North America
- Coordinates: 47°38′19″N 122°30′26″W
- Country: United States
- State: Washington
- County: Kitsap
- Named for: William Bainbridge

Government
  - Type: Council–manager
  - Body: City council
  - Mayor: Ashley Mathews
  - City Manager: Blair King

Area
  - Total: 65.08 sq mi (168.55 km^{2})
  - Land: 27.61 sq mi (71.52 km^{2})
  - Water: 37.46 sq mi (97.03 km^{2})
- Elevation: 102 ft (31 m)

Population (2020)
  - Total: 24,825
  - Density: 916.1/sq mi (353.72/km^{2})
- Time zone: UTC-8 (Pacific (PST))
  - Summer (DST): UTC-7 (PDT)
- ZIP Code: 98110
- Area code(s): 206, 564
- FIPS code: 53-03736
- GNIS feature ID: 2409770
- Website: bainbridgewa.gov

Bainbridge Island is a city and island in Kitsap County, Washington, United States. It is located in Puget Sound. The population was 24,825 at the 2020 census, making Bainbridge Island the second largest city in Kitsap County. The city limits encompass the entire island.

The island is separated from the Kitsap Peninsula by Agate Passage, with Bremerton lying to the southwest. Bainbridge Island is a suburb of Seattle, connected to downtown via a Washington State Ferries route. Road access is provided by State Route 305, which uses the Agate Pass Bridge, and continues to Poulsbo and the Suquamish Indian Reservation.

== History ==
For thousands of years, members of the Suquamish people and their ancestors lived on the land now called Bainbridge Island. There were nine villages on the island; these included winter villages at Port Madison, Battle Point, Point White, Lynwood Center, Port Blakely, and Eagle Harbor, as well as summer villages at Manzanita, Fletcher Bay, and Rolling Bay.

In 1792, English explorer Captain George Vancouver spent several days with his ship HMS Discovery anchored off Restoration Point at the southern end of Bainbridge Island while boat parties surveyed other parts of Puget Sound. Vancouver spent a day exploring Rich Passage, Port Orchard, and Sinclair Inlet. He failed to find Agate Passage, and so his maps show Bainbridge Island as a peninsula. Vancouver named Restoration Point on May 29, the anniversary of the English Restoration, in honor of King Charles II.

In 1841, US Navy Lieutenant Charles Wilkes visited the island while surveying the Pacific Northwest. Lt. Wilkes named the island after Commodore William Bainbridge, commander of the frigate USS Constitution in the War of 1812. Settlers originally used Bainbridge Island as a center for the logging and shipbuilding industries with the island being clearcut at least two times in its history. The island was known for huge and accessible cedars, which were especially in demand for ships' masts. The original county seat of Kitsap County was at Port Madison on the island's north end.

In 1855, the Suquamish tribe relinquished their claim to Bainbridge Island by signing the Point Elliott Treaty. The Suquamish agreed to cede all of their territory (which included Bainbridge Island) to the United States in exchange for a reservation at Port Madison and fishing rights to Puget Sound.

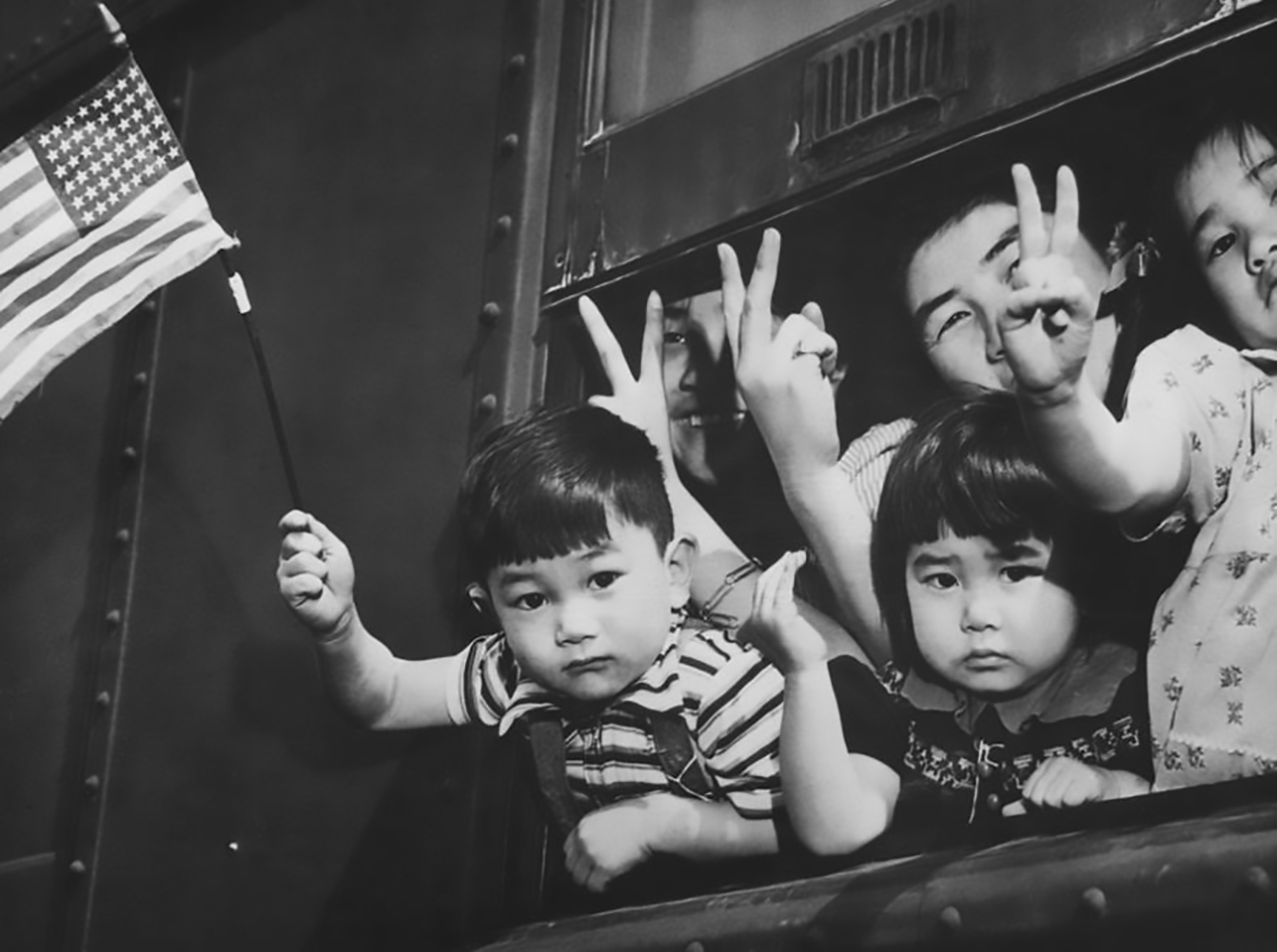
A group of Japanese-American residents of Bainbridge Island wave the American flag and give the victory sign as they are forcibly sent to an internment camp, March 30, 1942.

The first generation of Japanese immigrants, the Issei, came in 1883. During World War II, Japanese-American residents of Bainbridge Island were the first to be sent to internment camps, an event commemorated by the Bainbridge Island Japanese American Exclusion Memorial, which opened in 2011. They were held by the US government through the duration of the war for fear of espionage. A High-frequency direction finding (HFDF) station was established here by the Navy during the war. These radio intercept sites along the West Coast were used to track Japanese warships and merchant marine vessels as far away as the Western Pacific. The other West Coast stations were in California at Point Arguello, Point Saint George, Farallon Islands and San Diego.

Since the 1960s, Bainbridge Island has become an increasingly affluent bedroom community of Seattle, a 35-minute ride away on the Washington State Ferries.

The city has occupied the entire space of Bainbridge Island since February 28, 1991, when the 1.5-square-mile (3.9 km^{2}) city of Winslow (incorporated on August 9, 1947), annexed the rest of the island after a narrowly passed November 1990 referendum. It officially remained the city of Winslow for several months, until November 7, 1991, at which time the city of Winslow was renamed the city of Bainbridge Island.

== Geography ==
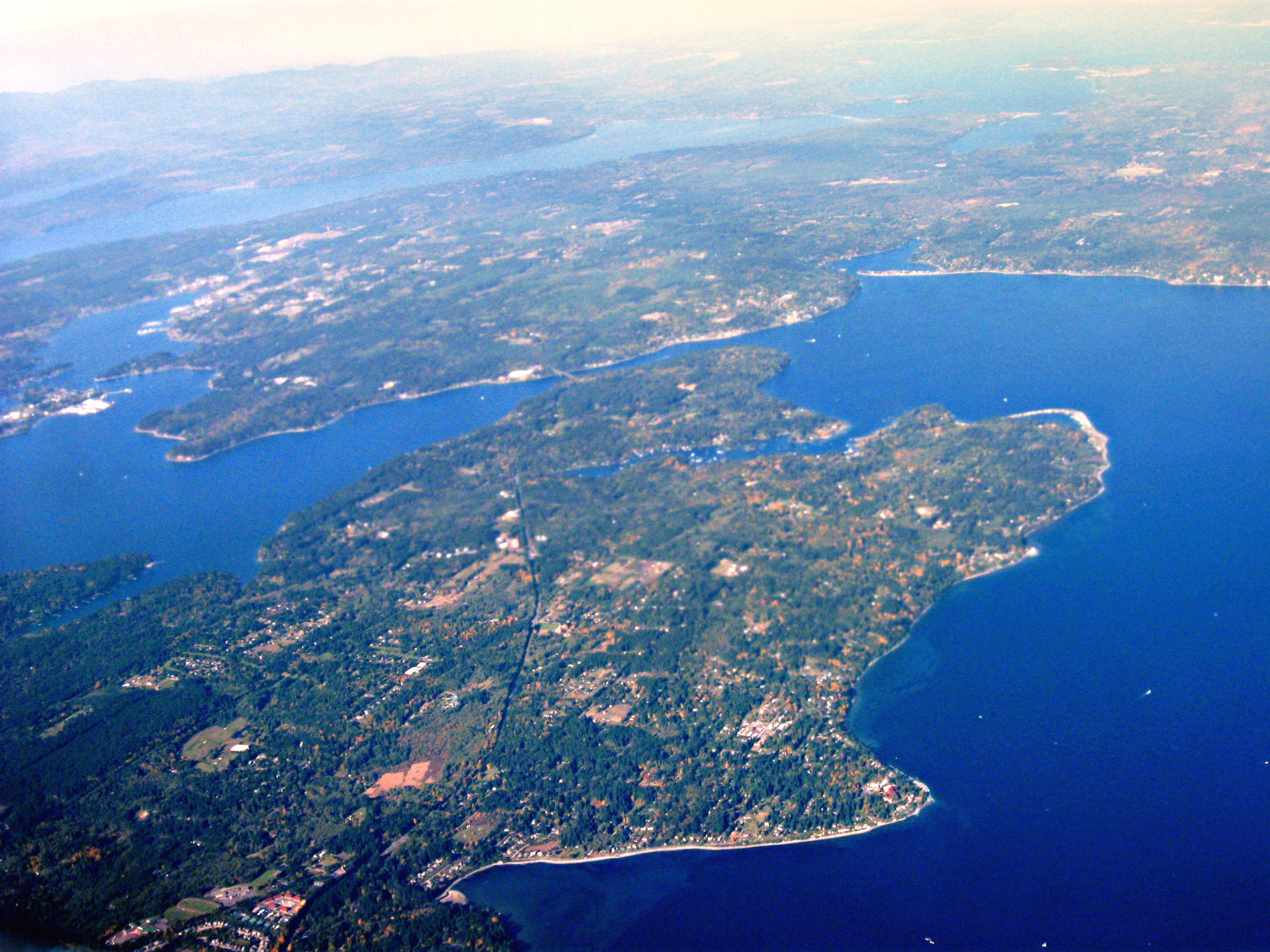
Aerial view of the northern part of Bainbridge Island adjoining Puget Sound, with Agate Passage in center, Liberty Bay on the Kitsap Peninsula in the background, and the Hood Canal beyond

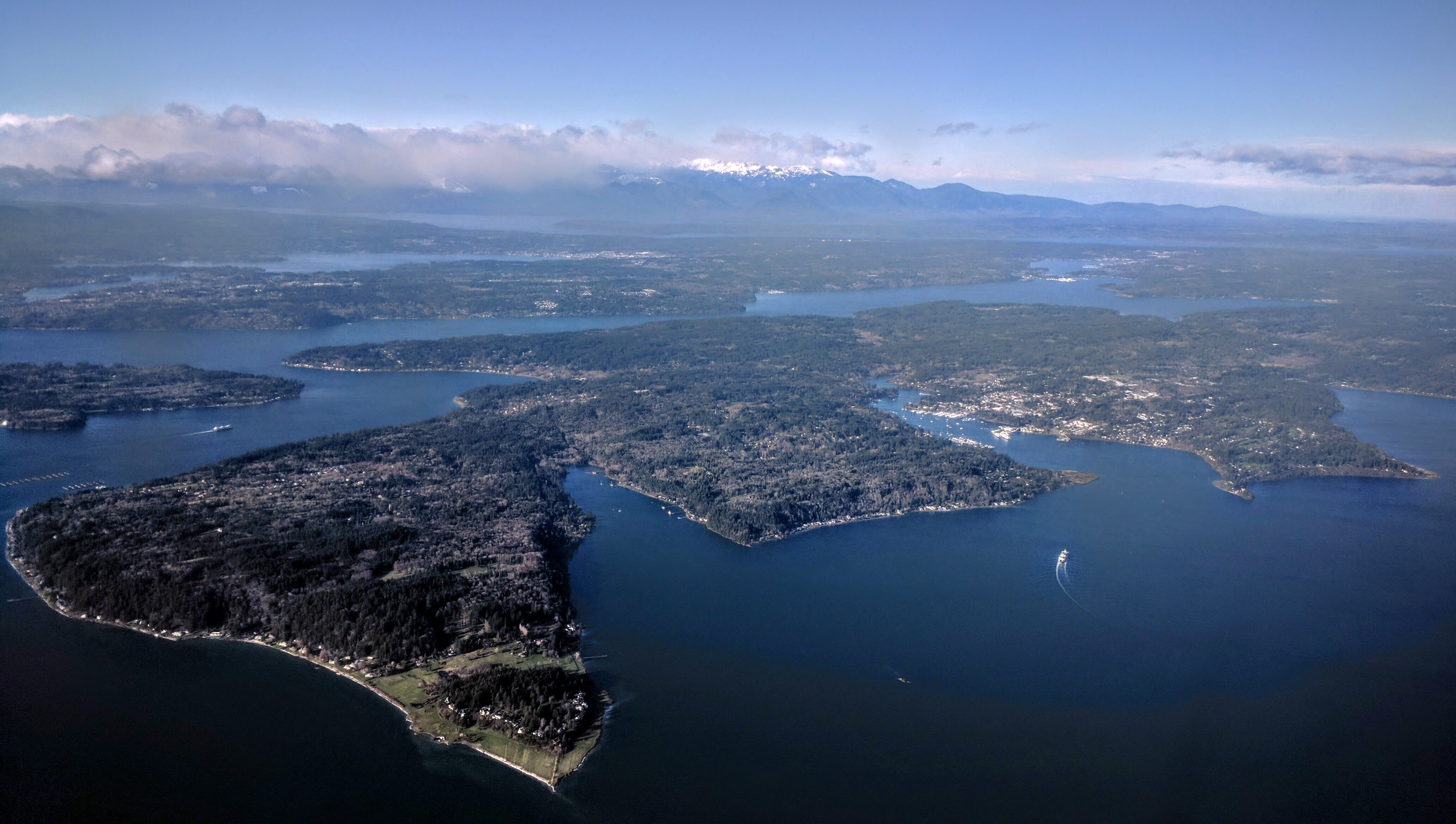
Aerial view of Bainbridge Island from the southeast, showing the Bainbridge Island ferry from Seattle making the first of two turns to bring it into Eagle Harbor, with Blakely Harbor to its left

Bainbridge Island was formed during the last ice age—13,000 to 15,000 years ago—when the 3,000-foot-thick (910 m) Vashon Glacier scraped out the Puget Sound and Hood Canal basins.

Bainbridge Island is in the Puget Sound Basin, east of the Kitsap Peninsula, directly east of the Manette Peninsula and west of Seattle. The island is about 5 miles (8 km) wide and 10 miles (16 km) long, encompassing nearly 17,778 acres (27.778 sq mi; 71.95 km^{2}), and is one of Puget Sound's larger islands.

Bainbridge Island shorelines border the main body of Puget Sound, as well as Port Orchard Bay, a large protected embayment, and two high-current tidal passages, Rich Passage and Agate Pass. The island has an irregular coastline of approximately 53 miles (85 km), with numerous bays and inlets and a significant diversity of other coastal land forms, including spits, bluffs, dunes, lagoons, cuspate forelands, tombolos, tide flats, streams and tidal deltas, islands, and rocky outcrops. The high point is 425-foot (130 m) Toe Jam Hill. Springbrook Creek is among the island's largest streams.

Restoration Point, the southeast tip of the island, was previously on the seabed of Puget Sound, but was raised 23 feet (7 meters) during an earthquake about 1,100 years ago, likely causing a tsunami.

On the Kitsap Peninsula, Bremerton and Poulsbo lie across the Port Orchard channel to the west, and the city of Port Orchard lies across Rich Passage to the south. Despite the short distance over water and significant commuting population between Bremerton and Bainbridge Island, proposals to construct a bridge have been resisted on the Bainbridge side for various reasons.

The island is quite hilly and hosts the Chilly Hilly bicycle ride every February.

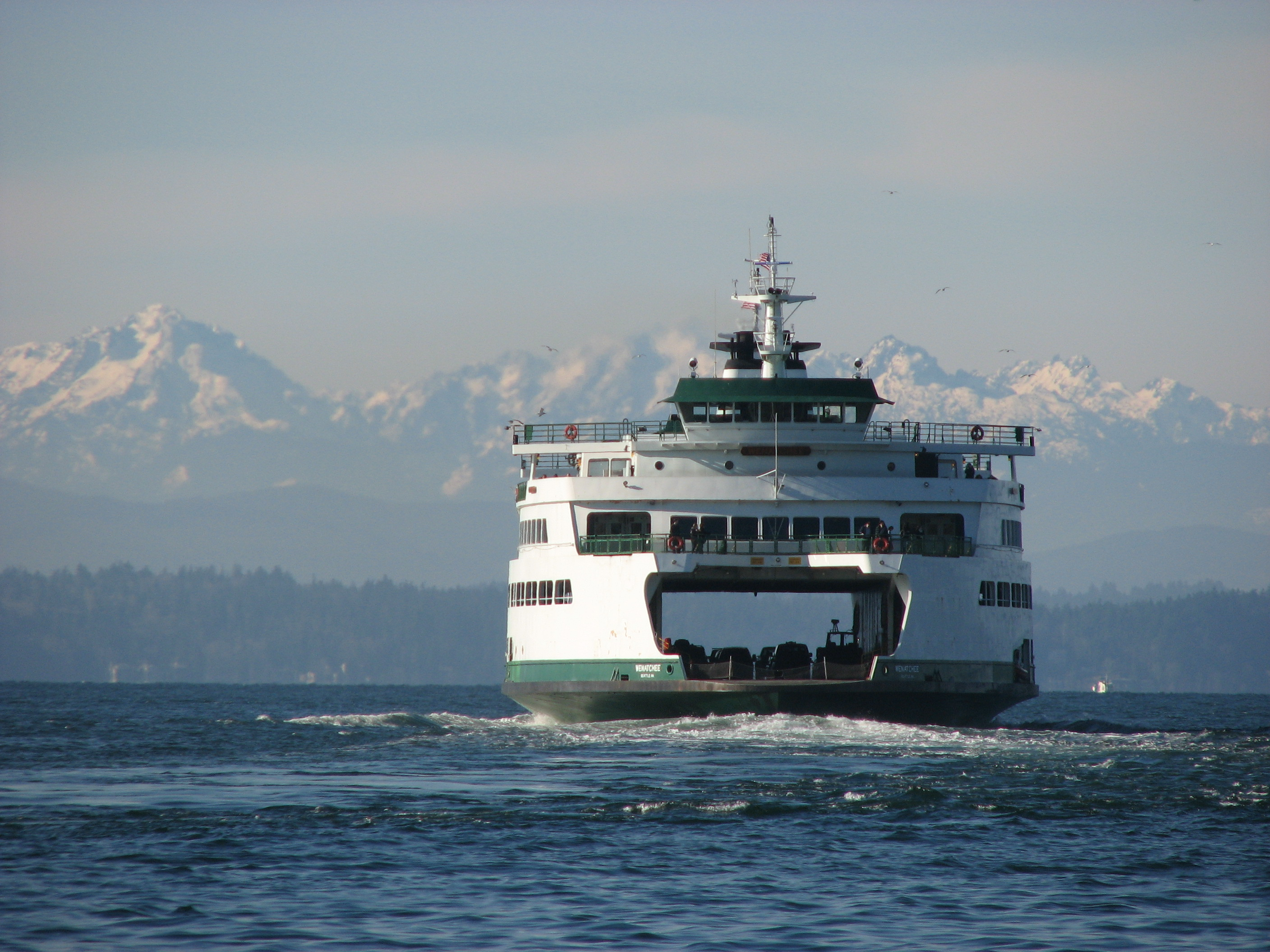
The ferry Wenatchee en route from Seattle to Bainbridge Island

Bainbridge Island can be accessed by motor vehicle, bicycle, or foot through two access points, both on Washington State Route 305. Bainbridge Island is connected to the Kitsap Peninsula by the Agate Pass Bridge, carrying SR 305 over Agate Passage at the island's northwest corner. The only other way off the island is by the Seattle–Bainbridge Island ferry, the Washington State Ferries service from the dock at Winslow in Eagle Harbor to Colman Dock (Pier 52) in Seattle. Numerous public right of way access points to water around the island also exist, officially called Road Ends.

=== Communities ===
When the city of Winslow annexed the entirety of Bainbridge Island in 1991, it absorbed numerous named unincorporated communities. Most of these are still referred to by name.

== Demographics ==
Historical population
Census	Pop.	Note	%±
1950	637		—
1960	919		44.3%
1970	1,461		59.0%
1980	2,196		50.3%
1990	3,081		40.3%
2000	20,308		559.1%
2010	23,025		13.4%
2020	24,825		7.8%
US Decennial Census

According to a 2007 estimate, the median income for a household in the city was $88,243, and the median income for a family was $108,605. Males had a median income of $65,853 versus $42,051 for females. The per capita income for the city was $37,482. About 3.0% of families and 4.4% of the population were below the poverty line, including 3.8% of those under age 18 and 3.3% of those age 65 or over.

The socioeconomic profile varies significantly between the rural parts of the island and Winslow, its urban center. In contrast to Bainbridge Island as a whole, Winslow is home to households with a wide range of incomes. In 2010, the census block group in which Winslow is located had a median household income of $42,000, less than half of the island's median household income and one-third of several of the island's wealthiest block groups, and also $10,000 less than national and statewide averages. More than half of Winslow households live in rental units, compared to 20% of households across the island.

=== 2020 census ===
As of the 2020 census, Bainbridge Island had a population of 24,825. The median age was 50.7 years, with 20.1% of residents under the age of 18 and 26.7% aged 65 or older. For every 100 females there were 93.8 males, and for every 100 females age 18 and over there were 90.9 males age 18 and over.

99.5% of residents lived in urban areas, while 0.5% lived in rural areas.

There were 10,157 households in Bainbridge Island, of which 27.8% had children under the age of 18 living in them. Of all households, 62.3% were married-couple households, 11.8% were households with a male householder and no spouse or partner present, and 21.7% were households with a female householder and no spouse or partner present. About 23.7% of all households were made up of individuals and 14.2% had someone living alone who was 65 years of age or older.

There were 11,251 housing units, of which 9.7% were vacant. The homeowner vacancy rate was 1.0% and the rental vacancy rate was 6.5%.

Racial composition as of the 2020 census
Race	Number	Percent
White	21,148	85.2%
Black or African American	139	0.6%
American Indian and Alaska Native	115	0.5%
Asian	847	3.4%
Native Hawaiian and Other Pacific Islander	36	0.1%
Some other race	306	1.2%
Two or more races	2,234	9.0%
Hispanic or Latino (of any race)	1,140	4.6%

=== 2010 census ===
As of the 2010 census, there were 23,025 people, 9,470 households, and 6,611 families residing in the city. The population density was 833.9 inhabitants per square mile (322.0/km^{2}). There were 10,584 housing units at an average density of 383.3 per square mile (148.0/km^{2}). The racial makeup of the city was 91.0% White, 0.4% African American, 0.5% Native American, 3.2% Asian, 0.2% Pacific Islander, 0.7% from other races, and 3.9% from two or more races. Hispanic or Latino of any race were 3.9% of the population.

There were 9,470 households, of which 31.9% had children under the age of 18 living with them, 60.2% were married couples living together, 7.1% had a female householder with no husband present, 2.6% had a male householder with no wife present, and 30.2% were non-families. 25.1% of all households were made up of individuals, and 10.6% had someone living alone who was 65 years of age or older. The average household size was 2.41 and the average family size was 2.88.

The median age in the city was 47.7 years. 23.7% of residents were under the age of 18; 4.1% were between the ages of 18 and 24; 17.5% were from 25 to 44; 38% were from 45 to 64; and 16.4% were 65 years of age or older. The gender makeup of the city was 48.3% male and 51.7% female.

=== 2000 census ===
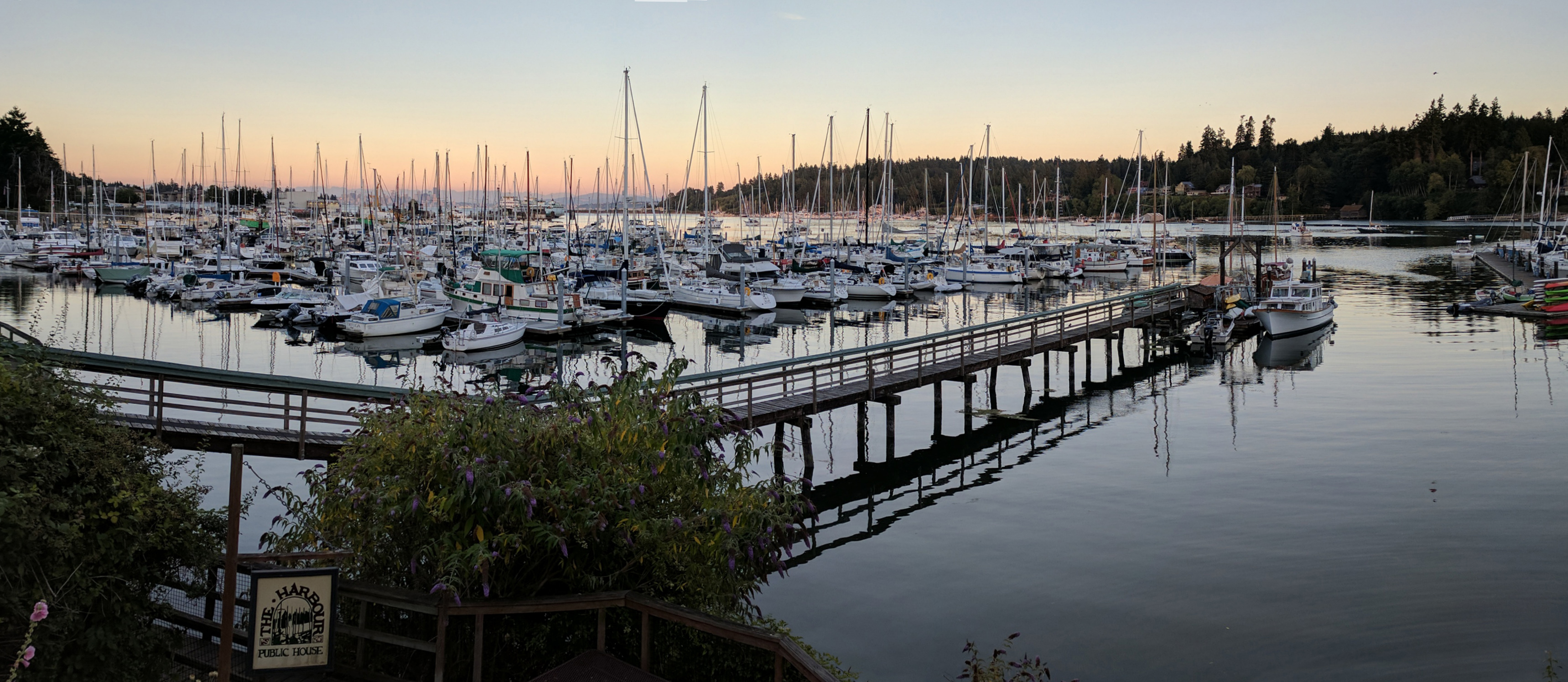
Panoramic view of Eagle Harbor from the Harbour Public House. The bridge in the foreground is part of the Harbour Marina, while the boats are in the Winslow Wharf Marina.

As of the census of 2000, there were 20,308 people, 7,979 households, and 5,784 families residing in the city. The population density was 735.6 inhabitants per square mile (284.0/km^{2}). There were 8,517 housing units at an average density of 308.5 per square mile (119.1/km^{2}). The racial makeup of the city was 92.88% White, 0.28% African American, 0.62% Native American, 2.40% Asian, 0.11% Pacific Islander, 0.75% from other races, and 2.96% from two or more races. Hispanics or Latinos, of any race, were 2.17% of the population.

There were 7,979 households, out of which 36.8% had children under the age of 18 living with them, 63.1% were married couples living together, 7.1% had a female householder with no husband present, and 27.5% were non-families. 22.6% of all households were made up of individuals, and 9.1% had someone living alone who was 65 years of age or older. The average household size was 2.52 and the average family size was 2.98.

In the city, the population was spread out, with 26.7% under the age of 18, 3.6% from 18 to 24, 23.8% from 25 to 44, 33.1% from 45 to 64, and 12.8% who were 65 years of age or older. The median age was 43 years. For every 100 females, there were 94.5 males. For every 100 females age 18 and over, there were 90.0 males.

== Economy ==
Bainbridge Island has four centers of commerce: Winslow, Lynwood Center, Fletcher Bay (which is also known as Island Center), and Rolling Bay. Winslow is the downtown core and has most of the shopping and dining. Lynwood Center on the south end of the island has several restaurants and a small hotel. Fletcher Bay (also referred to as Island Center) has a small grocery store and one restaurant. Rolling Bay is located on the east side of the island.

The local newspapers are the weekly Bainbridge Island Review, Kitsap Sun, and the Bainbridge Islander.

Chaval Outdoor, an outdoor gear company, was founded on Bainbridge Island. The Buy Nothing Project was founded on Bainbridge Island in July 2013.

== Education ==
=== Public schools ===
Bainbridge Island is served by the Bainbridge Island School District, which houses the following public schools:

- Capt. Johnston Blakely Elementary School (PK-4)
- x̌alilc (Halilts) Elementary School (PK-4)
- Ordway Elementary School (K-4) (offers the El Velero Spanish immersion program)
- Sonoji Sakai Intermediate School (5–6)
- Woodward Middle School (7–8)
- Bainbridge High School (9–12)

BISD also offers home-based and student-directed educational programming under the umbrella of the Commodore Options School:

- Mosaic Home Education Partnership (K-8)
- Odyssey Multiage Program (K-8)
- Eagle Harbor High School (9–12)

=== Private schools ===
- Montessori Country School (PK-6)
- Madrona School (Parent/Child, Preschool, Kindergarten, Grades 1–5)
- St. Cecilia Catholic School (PK-8)
- Bainbridge Island Montessori (PK)
- The Island School (K-5)
- Carden Country School (K-8)
- Hyla School (6–12)

The Puget Sound Naval Academy, formerly the Moran School, operated on the island from 1914 to 1933, and then again from 1937 to 1951.

== Sports and recreation ==
In 2001, Bainbridge Island Little League were represented in South Williamsport, Pennsylvania at the Little League World Series. The island's high school lacrosse team has won state titles, the most recent coming on May 24, 2025. In 2009, the Bainbridge High School Fastpitch team won the Washington 3A State Title. The team also played in the championship game in 2010. In 2011, 2012 and 2018, the Bainbridge High School Girls Lacrosse team won the state championship.

Pickleball was invented by the family of congressman Joel Pritchard at their summer home on Bainbridge Island in 1965. It is similar to badminton and tennis, but played with paddles and a lightweight plastic ball.

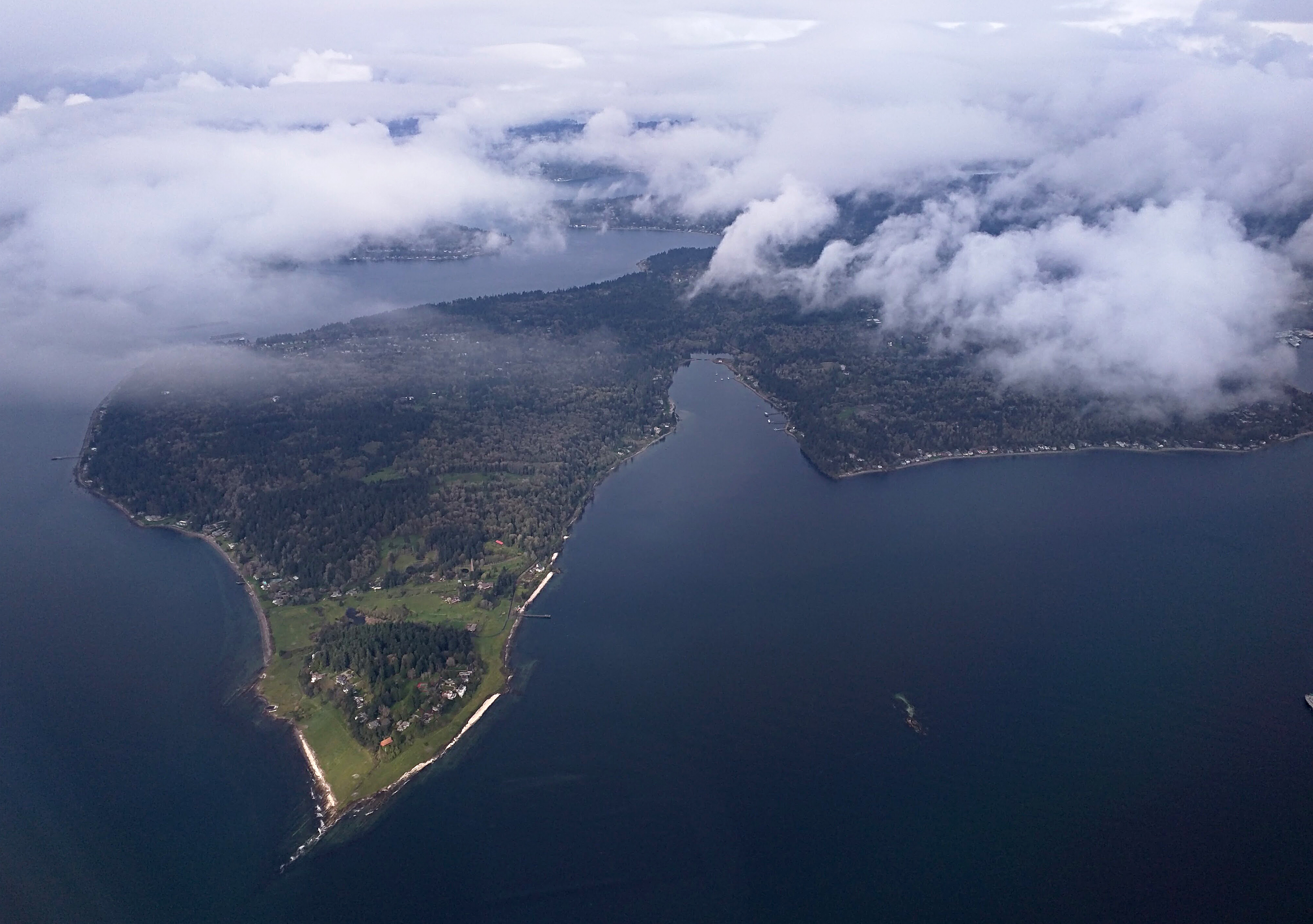
Aerial view of Restoration Point, with the Country Club of Seattle, and Blakely Harbor

== Government and politics ==
Bainbridge Island has a seven-member city council. The members are elected to staggered four-year terms and appoint a city manager.

The city is in the 23rd legislative district and Washington's 6th congressional district. Bainbridge Island is considered a stronghold of the Democratic Party. Jay Inslee, the 23rd governor of Washington, is a local resident, and represented it in Congress from 1999 to 2012. The city government coordinates an emergency flotilla of civilian vessels and docks for events that cut off-road and ferry access to Bainbridge Island. Drills are conducted to simulate an ad hoc ferry network to bring employees on the mainland to the island.

In the 2008 Democratic primary (which in Washington state was not used for delegate appointment), Barack Obama defeated Hillary Clinton by a margin of 67.8% to 29.7%. This was Obama's second-best performance in an incorporated municipality in the state, behind Yarrow Point. In the earlier caucus, Obama received 79.3% of delegates, Clinton received 19.8%, and 0.1% were uncommitted.

== Arts and culture ==
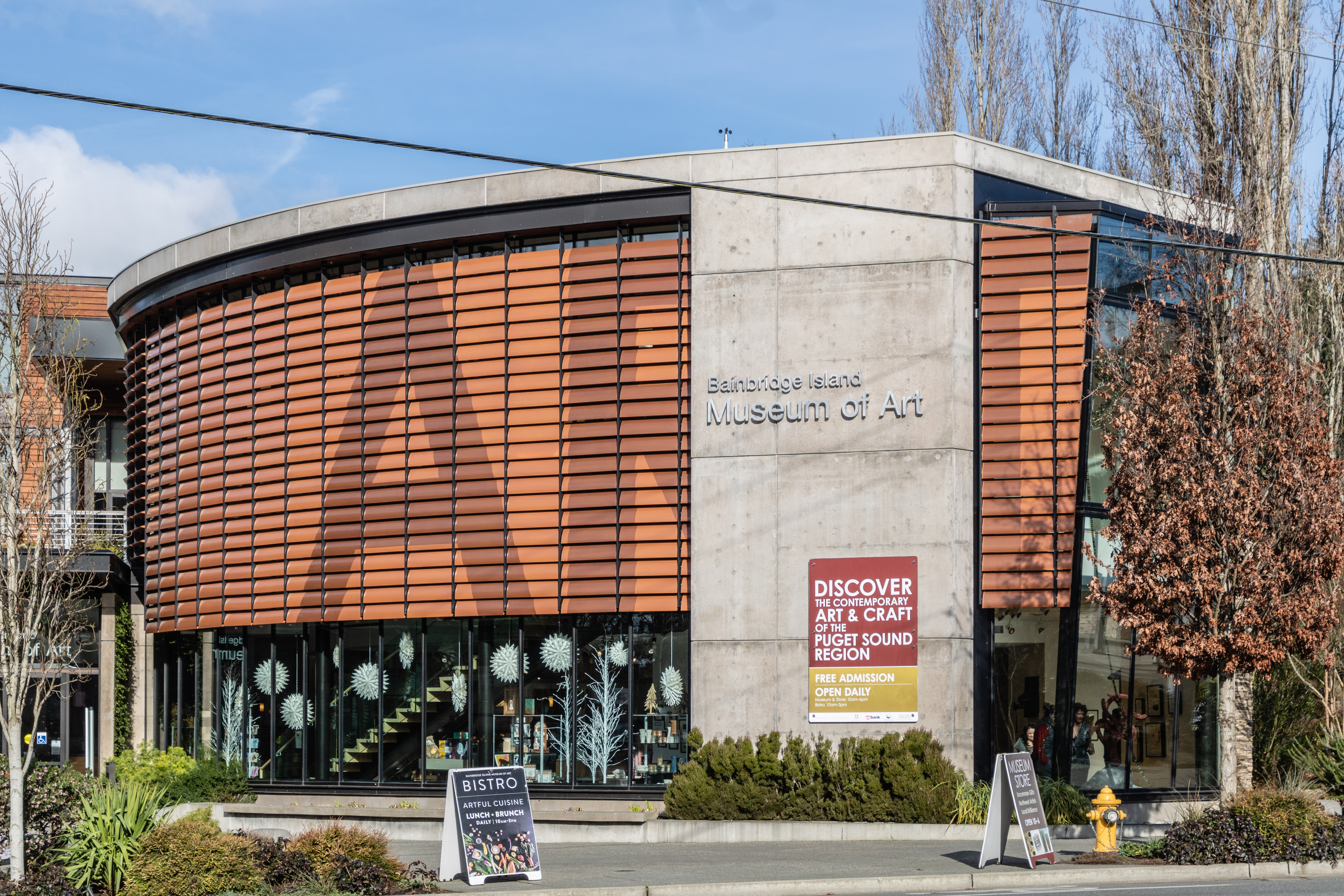
The Bainbridge Island Museum of Art, which opened in 2013

The Bainbridge Island Museum of Art opened in June 2013 near the Winslow ferry terminal. It was developed by Cynthia Sears, who began collecting works of art made by island residents in 1989. The museum cost $15.6 million to construct and includes a 99-seat auditorium, a classroom, and other spaces. The building has 20,000 square feet (1,900 m^{2}) of space and was designed to resemble the bow of a ship.

== In popular culture ==
The fictional San Piedro Island in the 1994 novel Snow Falling on Cedars is based on Bainbridge Island. The novel's author, David Guterson, lives on the island and worked for ten years as a teacher at Bainbridge High School.

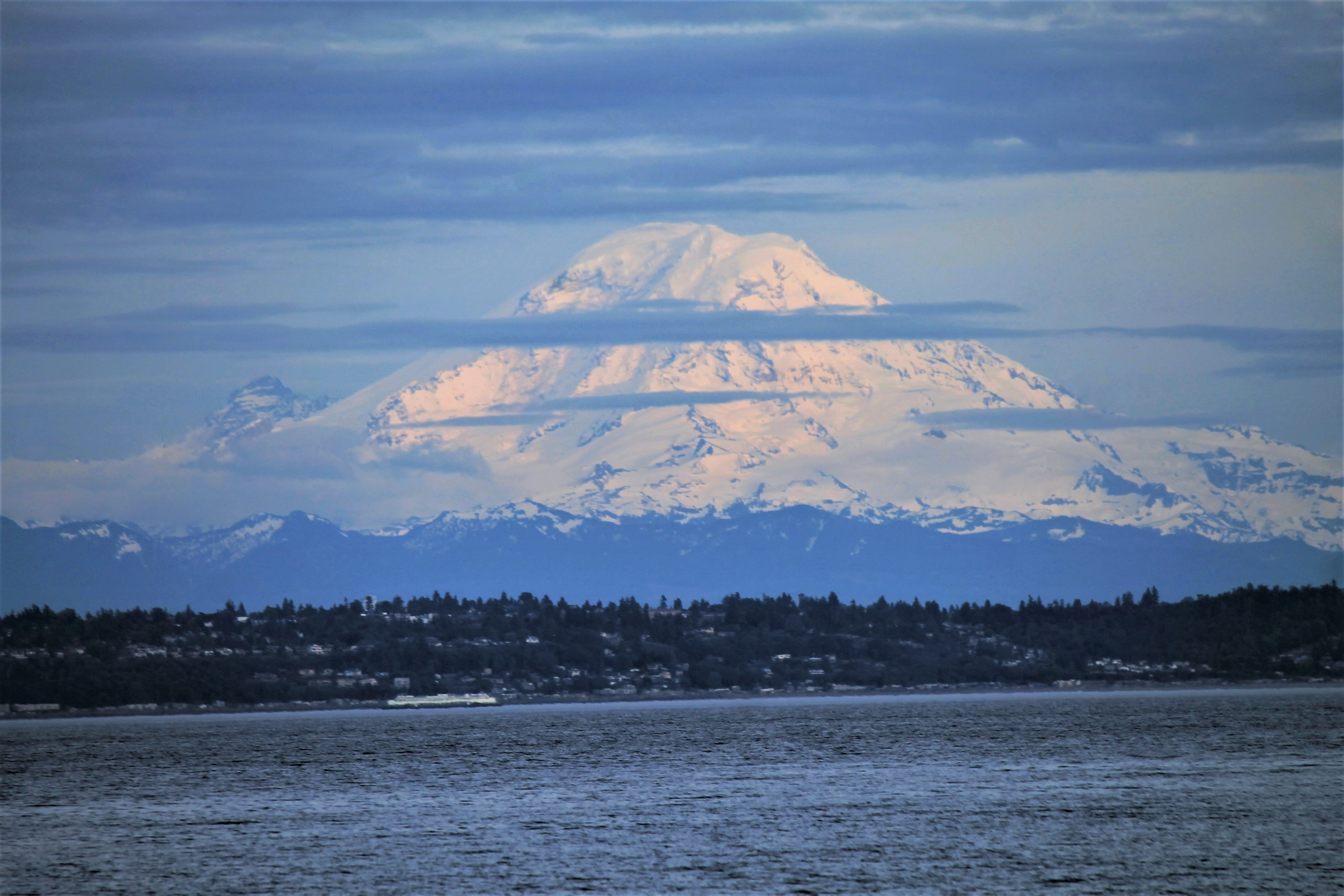
Mount Rainier seen from Bainbridge Island

Bainbridge Island is the main setting of the 2021 novel You Love Me, the third installment in the You series by novelist Caroline Kepnes. Kepnes visited Bainbridge while writing the story and used the names of several local businesses.

In Michael Crichton's 1994 novel Disclosure, protagonist Tom Sanders lives with his wife and two children on Bainbridge Island. Some scenes from the film adaptation later that year were filmed on the island, including at Bainbridge Ferry Terminal and Capt. Johnston Blakely Elementary School.

== Photo gallery ==
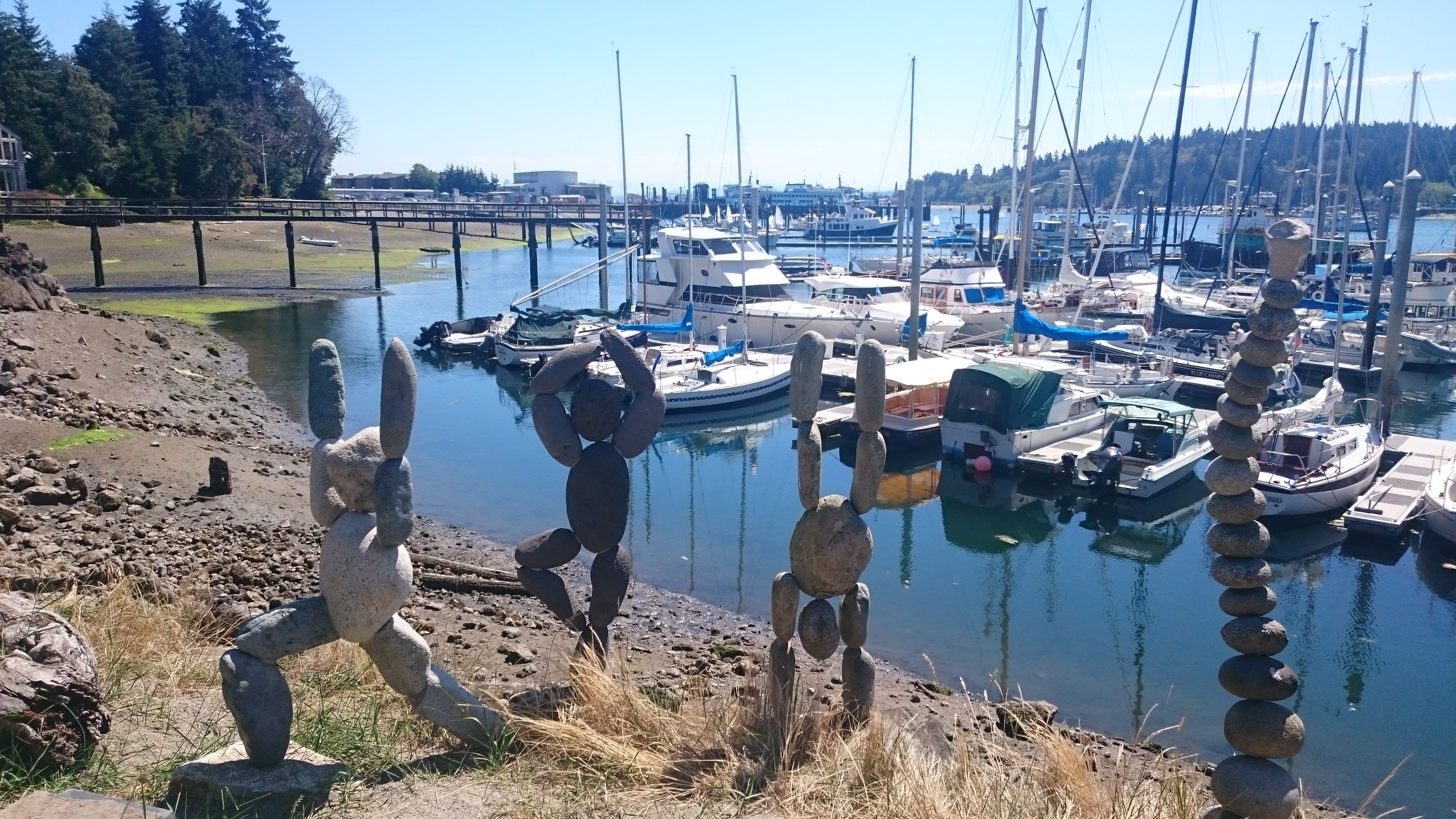
Stone Sculptures at Winslow Wharf Marina

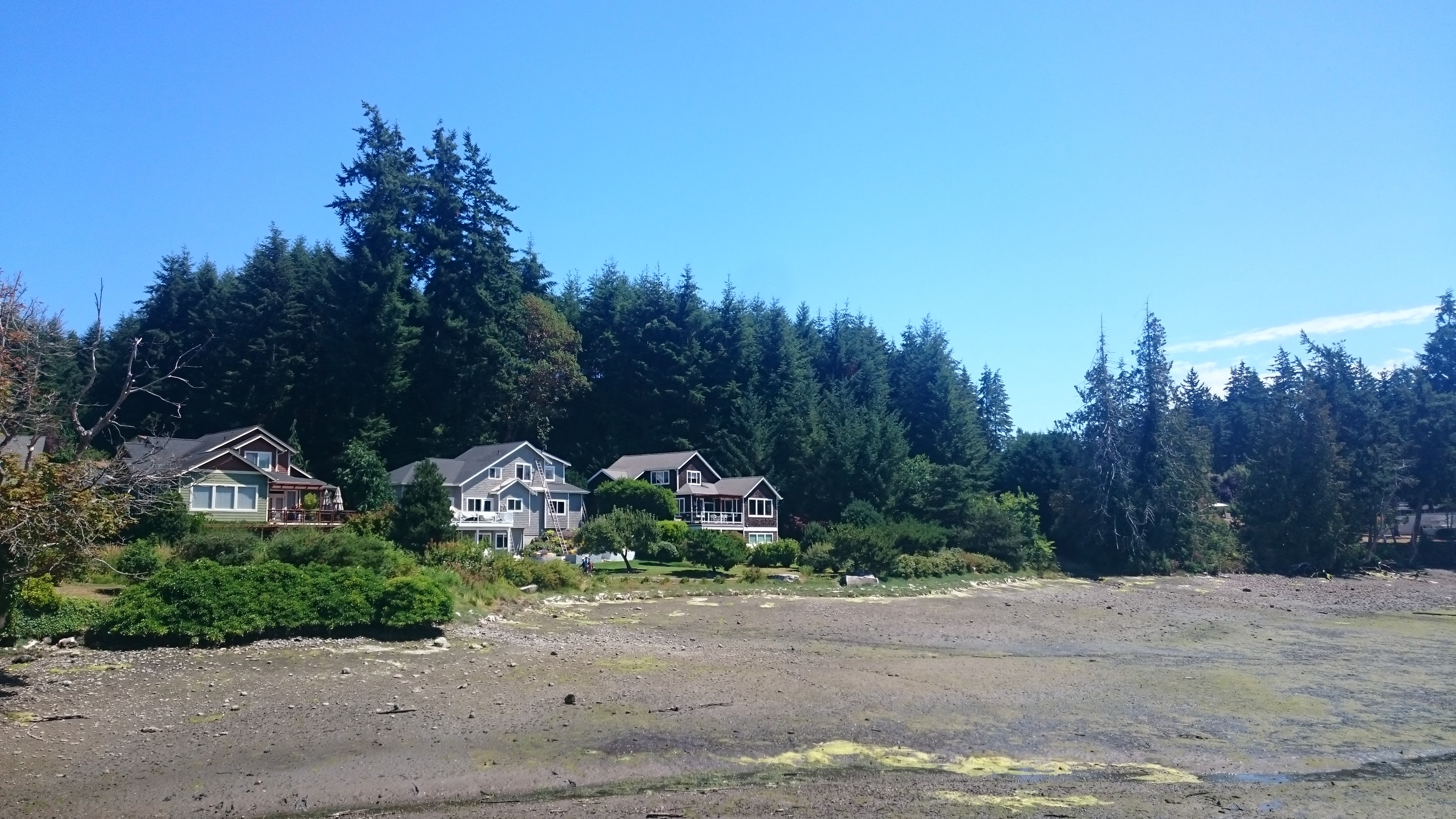
Cottages on Bainbridge Island

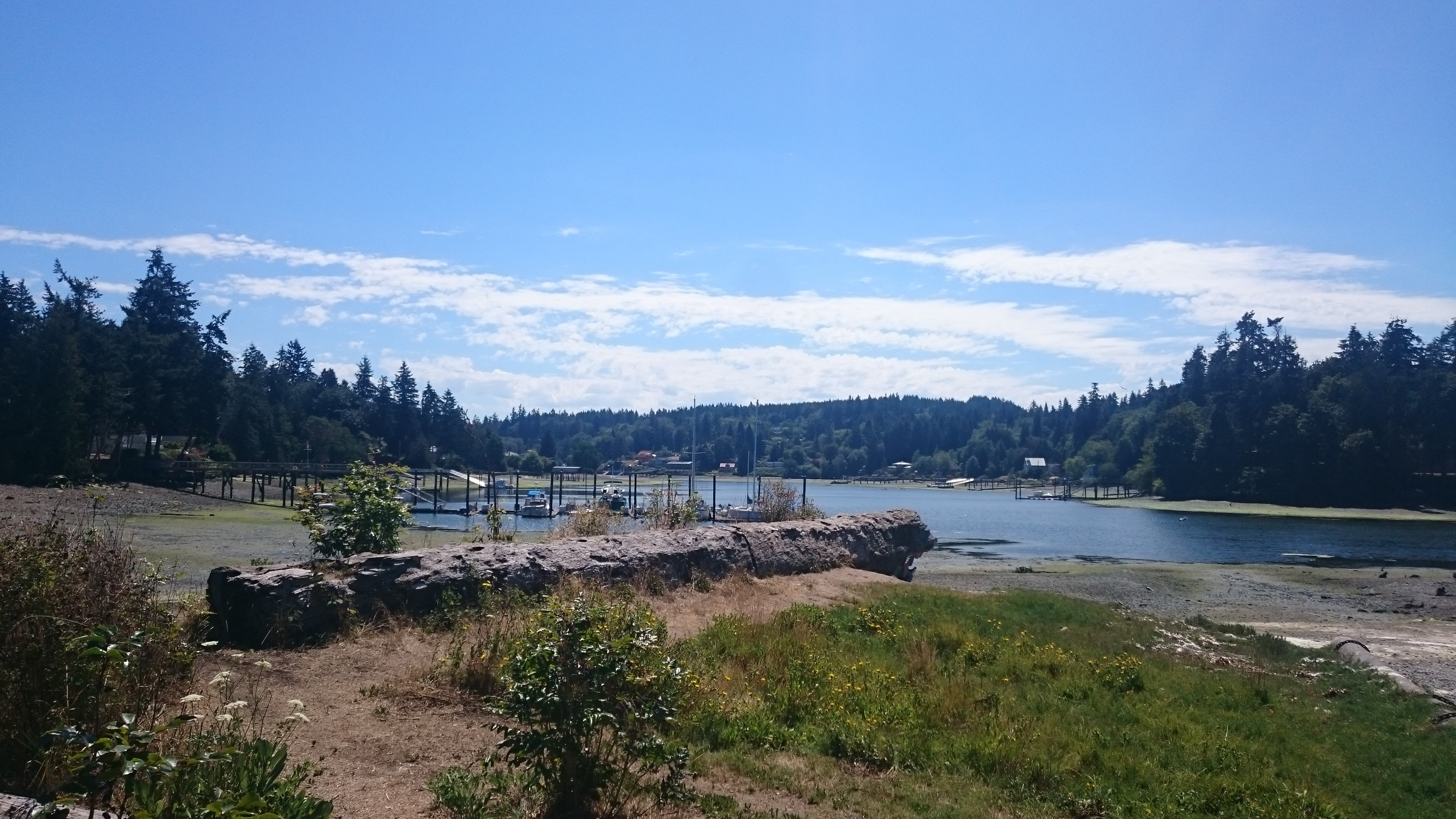
Docks and forest clearing on Bainbridge Island

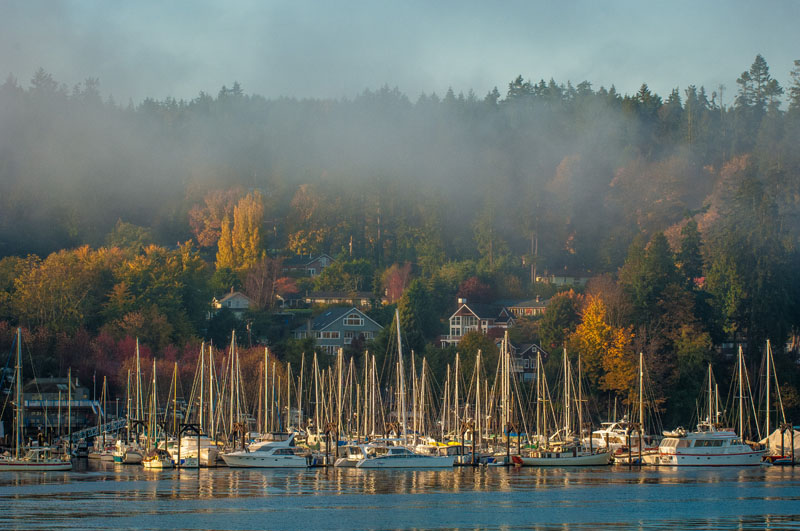
Mist surrounds the marina.

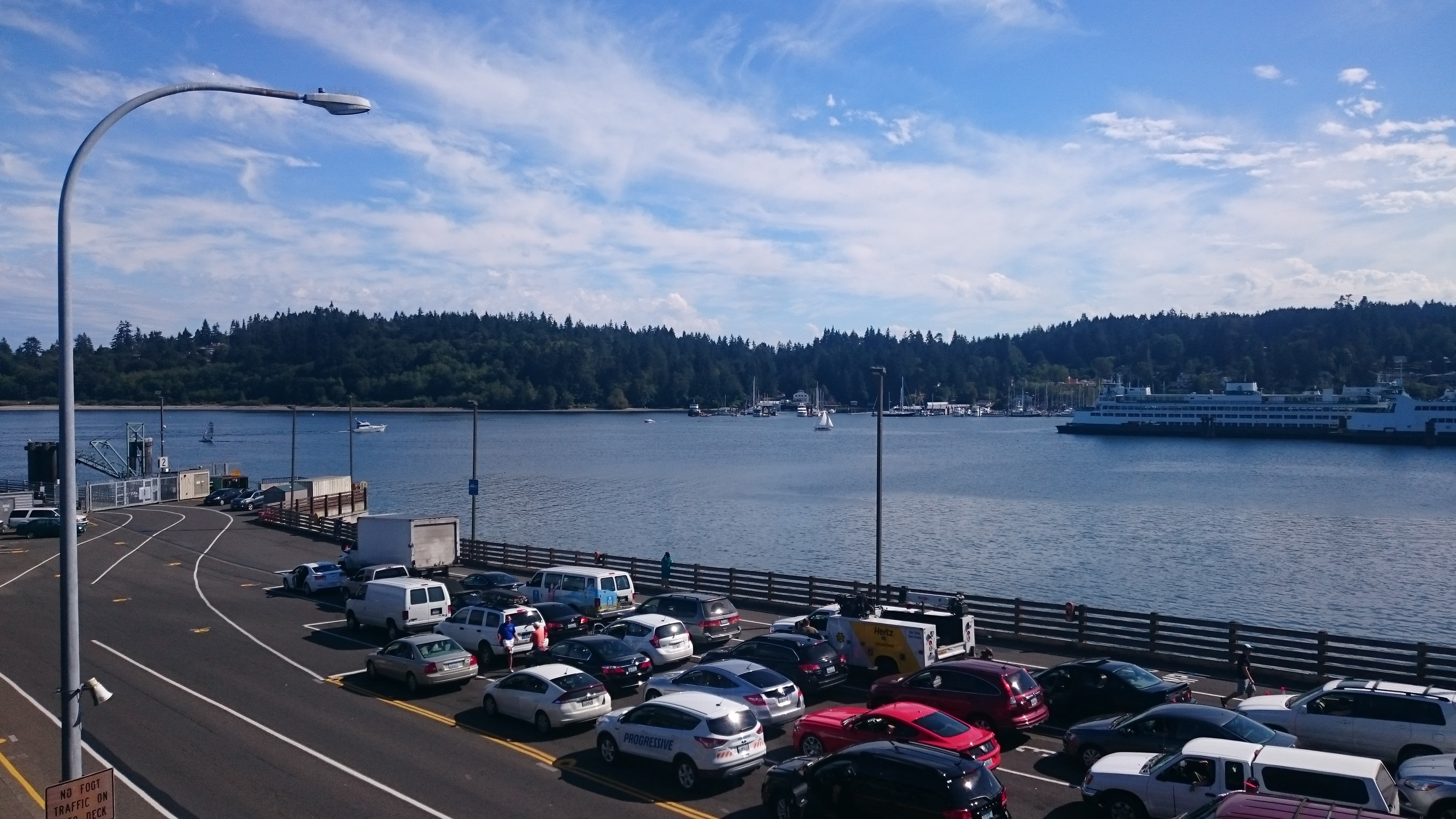
Seattle-bound cars waiting at Bainbridge Island Ferry Terminal

== Notable people ==
- Kathleen Alcalá – author
- Laura Allen – actress
- Bruce Barcott – author
- Jane F. Barry – author, Linksbridge principal
- Marshall Latham Bond – landlord, employer of Jack London
- John Henry Browne – defense attorney
- Frank Buxton – actor, author and television director
- Paul Brainerd – founder of Islandwood
- Dove Cameron – actress and singer
- Chad Channing – musician, former drummer with Nirvana
- Leeann Chin – founder of the Leeann Chin restaurant chain
- Ben Eisenhardt – professional basketball player
- Jonathan Evison – author
- Stefan Frei – professional soccer player
- Bill Frisell – musician
- Ruth Fremson – The New York Times journalist; resides on Bainbridge
- Meg Greenfield – editor, The Washington Post
- David Guterson, author
- Kristin Hannah, author
- Brendan Hill, musician, drummer with Blues Traveler
- Matthew Inman, author of The Oatmeal
- Jay Inslee, governor of Washington
- Russell Johnson, actor, known for Gilligan's Island
- Chris Kattan, comedian, actor
- David Korten, economist, author and political activist
- Damien Lawson, musician, singer with Awaken the Empire
- Garrett Madison, mountain climber
- Dinah Manoff, actress
- Jon Brower Minnoch, heaviest man recorded in history
- Elizabeth Mitchell, actress
- Jack Olsen, author
- John Perkins, author
- Dav Pilkey, author, illustrator
- Gifford Pinchot III, author, entrepreneur
- Jack Prelutsky, poet
- Dorothy Provine, actress
- Fred Ramsdell, immunologist and Nobel Prize laureate
- Kiel Reijnen, professional cyclist
- JR Ritchie, professional MLB baseball player
- Ben Shepherd, bassist with Soundgarden
- Emily Silver, Olympic swimmer (silver medalist)
- Allen Strange, professor of music
- Michael Trimble, operatic tenor, voice teacher
- Ed Viesturs, mountain climber
- Marcel Vigneron, runner-up of Top Chef
- Susan Wiggs, author
- Garin Wolf, television writer, playwright
- Andrew Wood, musician
- Lindy West – American writer

== Sister cities ==
Bainbridge has the following sister cities:

- Ometepe Island, Nicaragua
- Nantes, France

== See also ==
- List of islands of Washington (state)
- Lynwood Theatre
