= Chaval =

Chaval may refer to:

- Chaval, Ceará, a municipality in Brazil
- Chaval (cartoonist), a French author and cartoonist
- Chaval, a main character in the 1885 novel Germinal by Émile Zola
- Mount Chaval, a mountain in Washington state

== See also ==
- Cheval (disambiguation)
- Kristijan Čaval, Croatian football player
- Chaval Outdoor, a privately owned company that designs and manufactures heated clothing
