= Flight suit =

Full-body garment

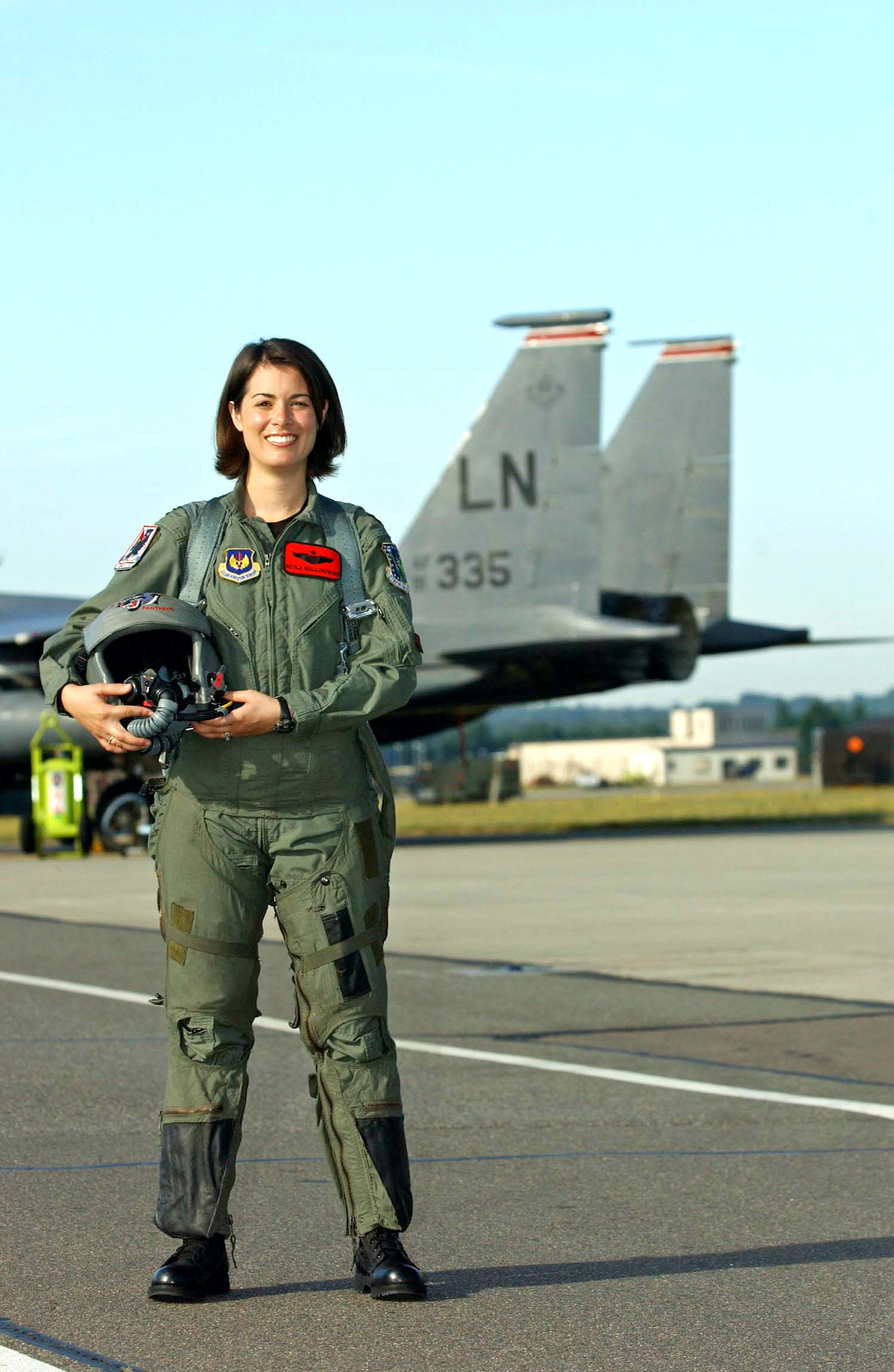
Typical modern flight suit

A flight suit is a full-body garment, worn while flying aircraft such as military airplanes, gliders and helicopters. Such a suit is generally made to keep the wearer warm, as well as being practical (plenty of pockets), and durable (including fire retardant). Its appearance is usually similar to a jumpsuit. A military flight suit may also show rank insignia. It is sometimes used by Special Forces as a combat uniform in close-quarters battle or visit, board, search, and seizure situations, for its practicality.

== History ==
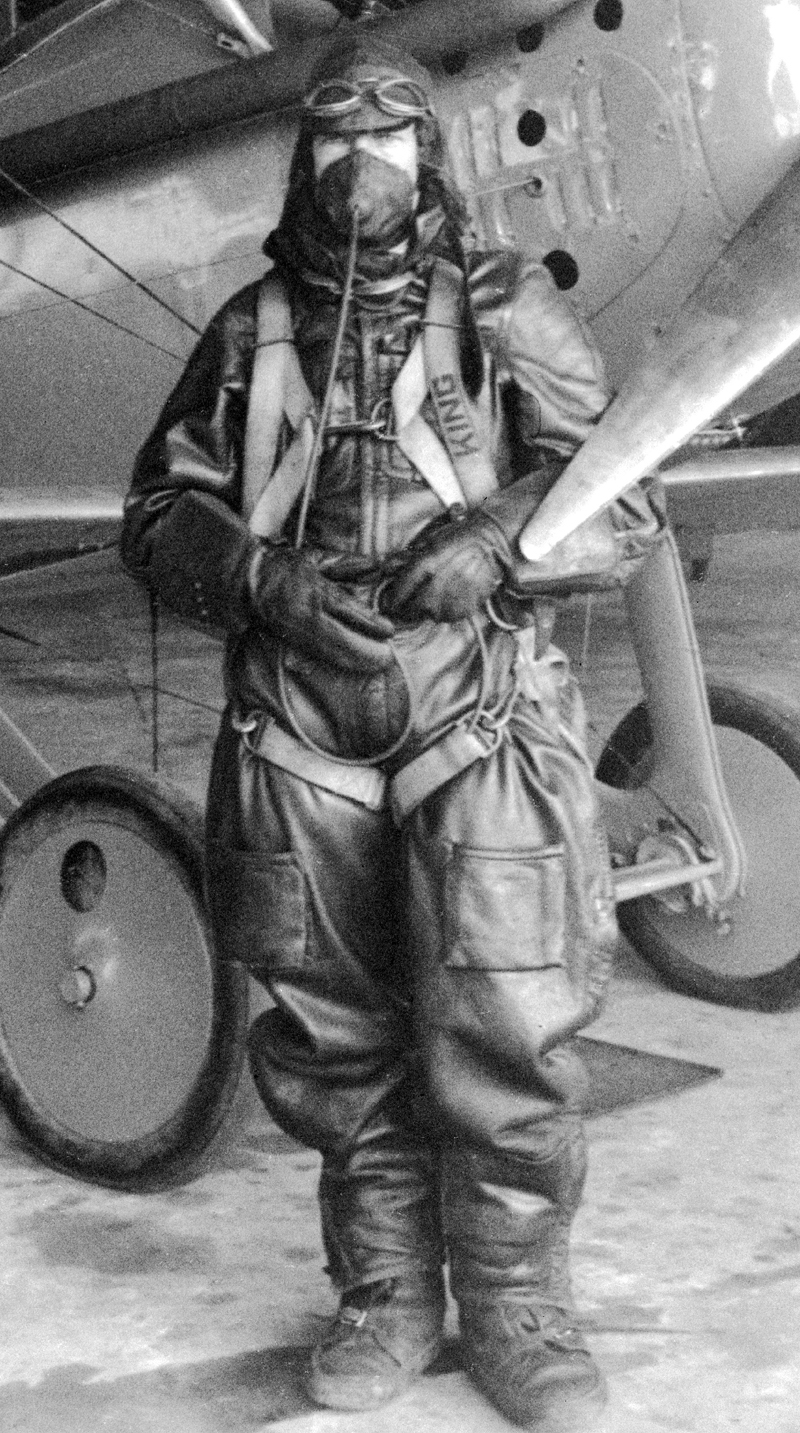
A flight suit worn in 1925

As aviation developed in unheated open cockpits, the need for warm clothing quickly became apparent, as did the need for multiple pockets with closures of buttons, snaps, or zippers to prevent loss of articles during maneuvers. During World War I, whilst motoring clothing was supplied, pilots were allowed to provide their own protective clothing by private purchase. Various types of flight jackets and trouser coverings were developed, and two-piece outfits were common among pilots to ward off the chill caused by slipstream and the cold of low-oxygen high-altitude flying. Leather quickly became the preferred material due to its durability and the protection it offered against flying debris such as insect strikes during climb-outs and landings, and oil thrown off by the simple rotary and inline motors of the time.

=== Sidcot suit ===
The Australian pilot Frederick Sidney Cotton's experience on the Western Front in WWI with high level and low-temperature flying led Cotton in 1916 to develop the revolutionary new "Sidcot" suit, a flying suit which solved the problem pilots had in keeping warm in the cockpit. This flying suit, with improvements, was widely used by the RAF until the 1950s. Cotton had flown in his working overalls one day and noticed that he had not gotten as cold as the other pilots and attributed this to the oil and grease that had soaked into the overalls. He recreated the effect by three layers: a thin fur liner separated from a Burberry [gabardine] outer by airproof silk which he had made up by Robinson & Cleaver in London and advertised under the Sidcot name at 8 guineas (£8 8s). When its effectiveness became known orders for leather coats were cancelled in favour of the SidCot. In extreme conditions thigh high fur boots could be worn with it, and on long flights it could be enhanced with electrically heated waistcoat, gloves and boot inner soles powered by a windmill generator (though flexing broke the wires in the gloves, and over voltage caused burns).

=== World War II ===
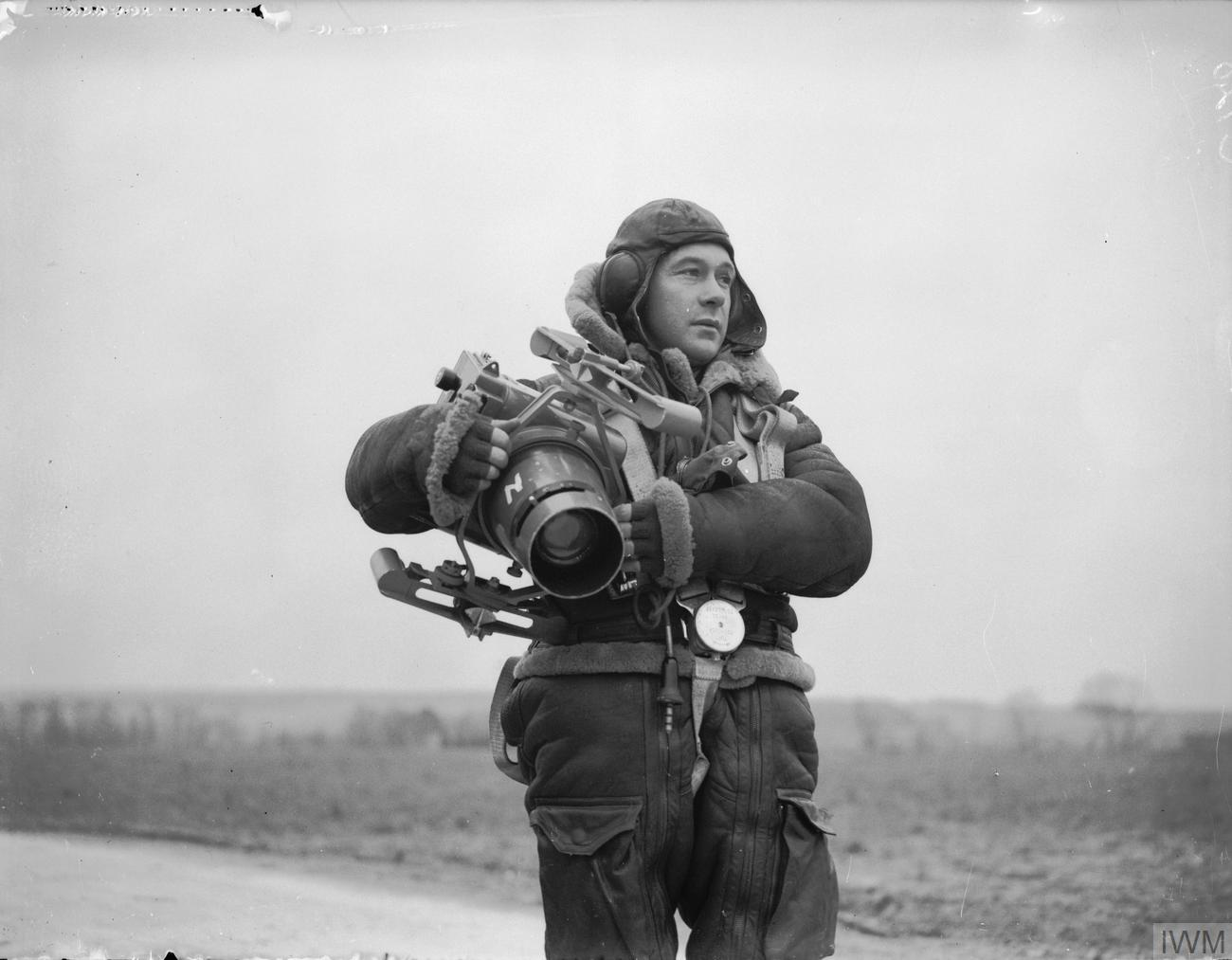
A British WWII crewman in full flightsuit (with aerial camera)

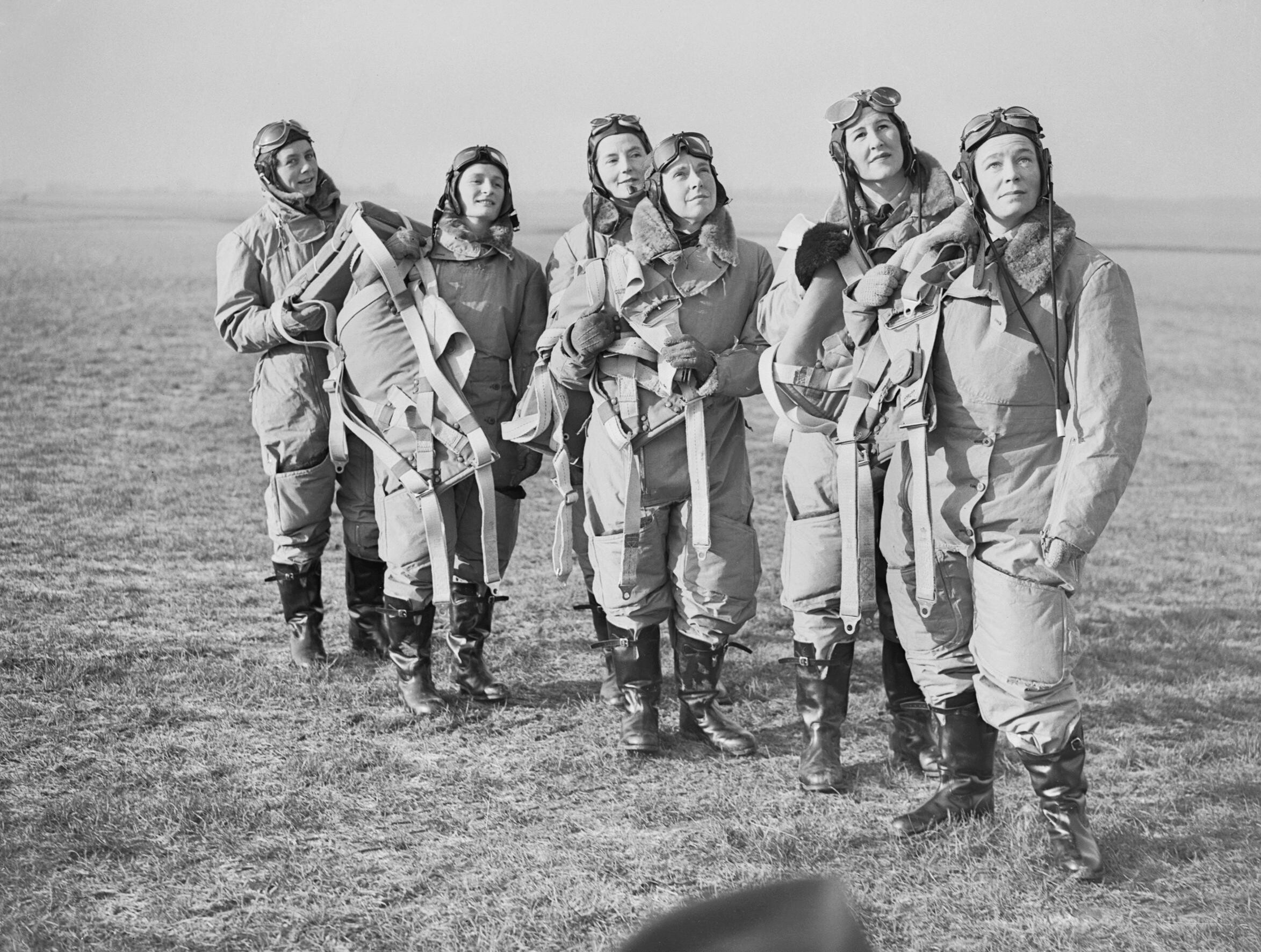
Pilots of the Air Transport Auxiliary in flying kit at Hatfield, January 1940

In the mid 1930s RAF standard flight suit was a variation on the Sidcot made of rubberised linen in a grey-green colour with a detachable fur collar; a zip had replaced buttons. This was paired with sheepskin-lined knee high suede boots (Note: The lower part of the boot was rubberised to stop the suede picking up water when walking across airfields) and a quilted liner could be added. All this was worn over the standard uniform. Electrically heated suits were developed for the RAF but only used in small numbers by bomber and high-altitude meteorological aircraft While fighter pilots were limited in cockpit space, RAF bomber crew could add insulated Irvin leather sheepskin jackets and trousers over their flying suit.

By the time World War II started in earnest, electrically heated suits were introduced by Lion Apparel in conjunction with General Electric for patrol and bomber crews who routinely operated at high altitudes above 30,000 feet (9,100 m), where air temperatures could get so cold that flesh could freeze instantly to any metal it touched. As enclosed and pressurized cabins came into operation, the necessity of bulky leather and shearling jackets and trousers began to fade. For example, pilots, navigators, and bombardiers of a Boeing B-17 Flying Fortress operating in Europe in 1944 comfortably wore their officer's uniforms under an A-2 flight jacket, due to the enclosed and heated cabin; but the tail- and ball turret gunners were more exposed, as were waist gunners who fired their guns through open window gunports. When the Boeing B-29 Superfortress was introduced in the fight against Japan, along with remote-controlled coordinated gun turrets, the fully pressurized crew cabin made bulky flight gear obsolete.

Where bomber pilots could wear their service uniforms as flight gear, fighter pilots needed a uniform that functioned in the tight confines of the typical fighter plane cockpit. The AN-S-31 flight suit was developed for the US Army Air Corps and featured two button-down breast pockets and two button-down shin pockets that could be accessed from the sitting position. The US Navy used a slightly different model that featured slanted pockets with zippers. The material used was either wool or tight-weave cotton for wind resistance and fire protection.

The need for short-duration fire protection was demonstrated early during that war. As technology advanced, the fire-protective flight suit, helmets, goggles, masks, gloves and footwear were designed and used. The footwear often could be cut to appear like civilian shoes in the country where the crew member would land if shot down.

Flak jackets were also developed to give bomber crews some protection from flying shrapnel, though these increased the overall weight of the airplane and reduced the effective bombload that could be carried.

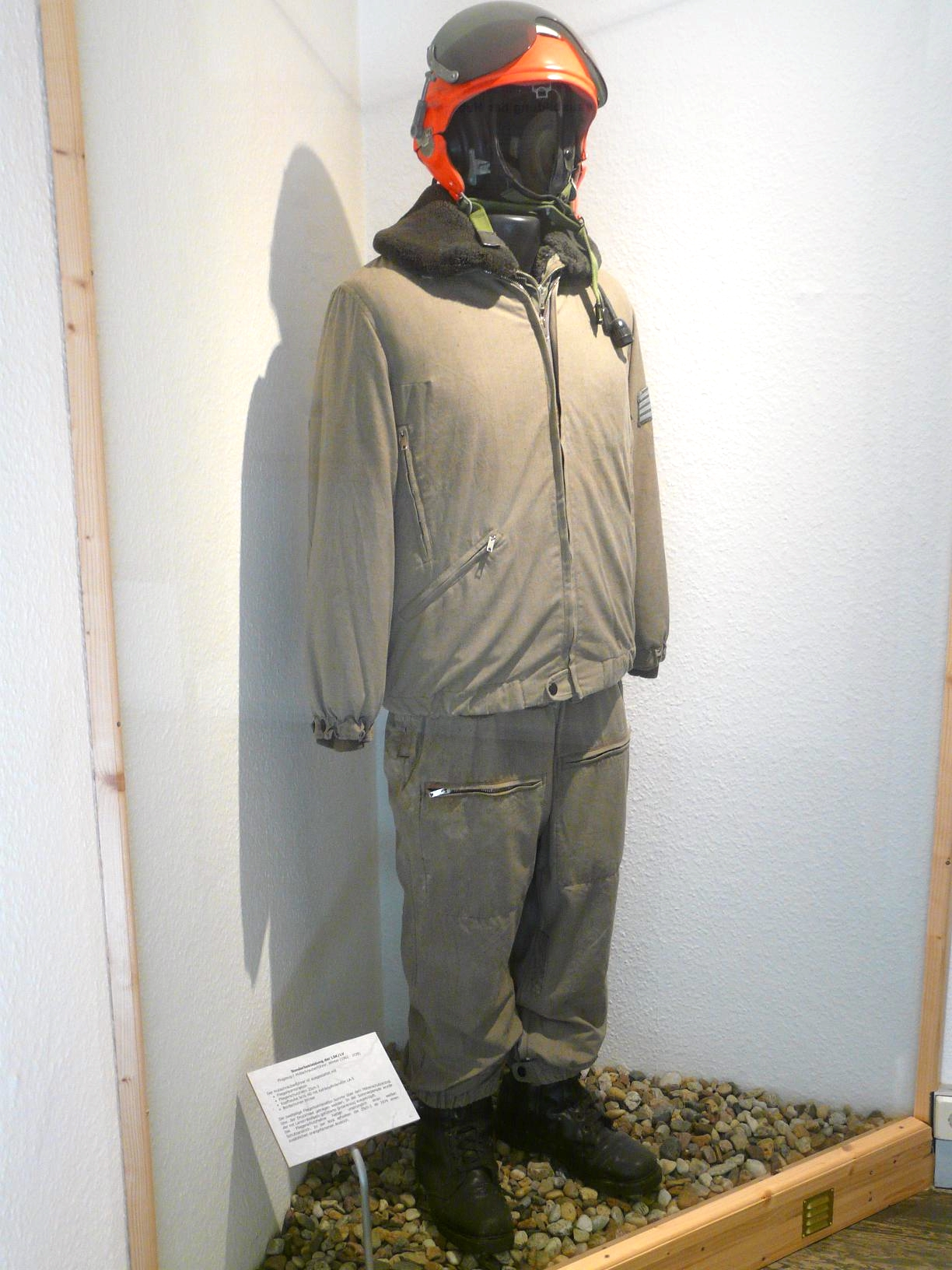
East German National People's Army flight suit, 1962–1978

With the era of jet flight and improved focus on safety; however, fully fire-retardant materials were required. It was also simpler to make a one-piece suit when it would potentially have to fit over existing clothing or various types of under-garments.

Also, with the coming of jet flight came the development of the G-suit, (Note: The first G-suits – based on water – were introduced during WWII and used by FAA and RAAF pilots) a special kind of flight suit (worn alone or in combination with a traditional flight suit) that protected the wearer from the physical stress of acceleration by compressing the body to keep blood from pooling in the legs. As the pilot executed high-G combat maneuvers, their blood would be pulled from their head and shift downwards into their lower body, starving the brain of oxygen and causing a blackout. The G-suit was designed to allow some retention of blood in the pilot's head, allowing them to execute high-G turns for sustained periods of time.

In the 1950s and 1960s, even more specialized suits needed to be developed for high-altitude surveillance (such as with the U-2 and Lockheed SR-71 Blackbird aircraft) and space flight. These would include full pressurization, and would be the precursor to today's space suits.

== Current standards ==
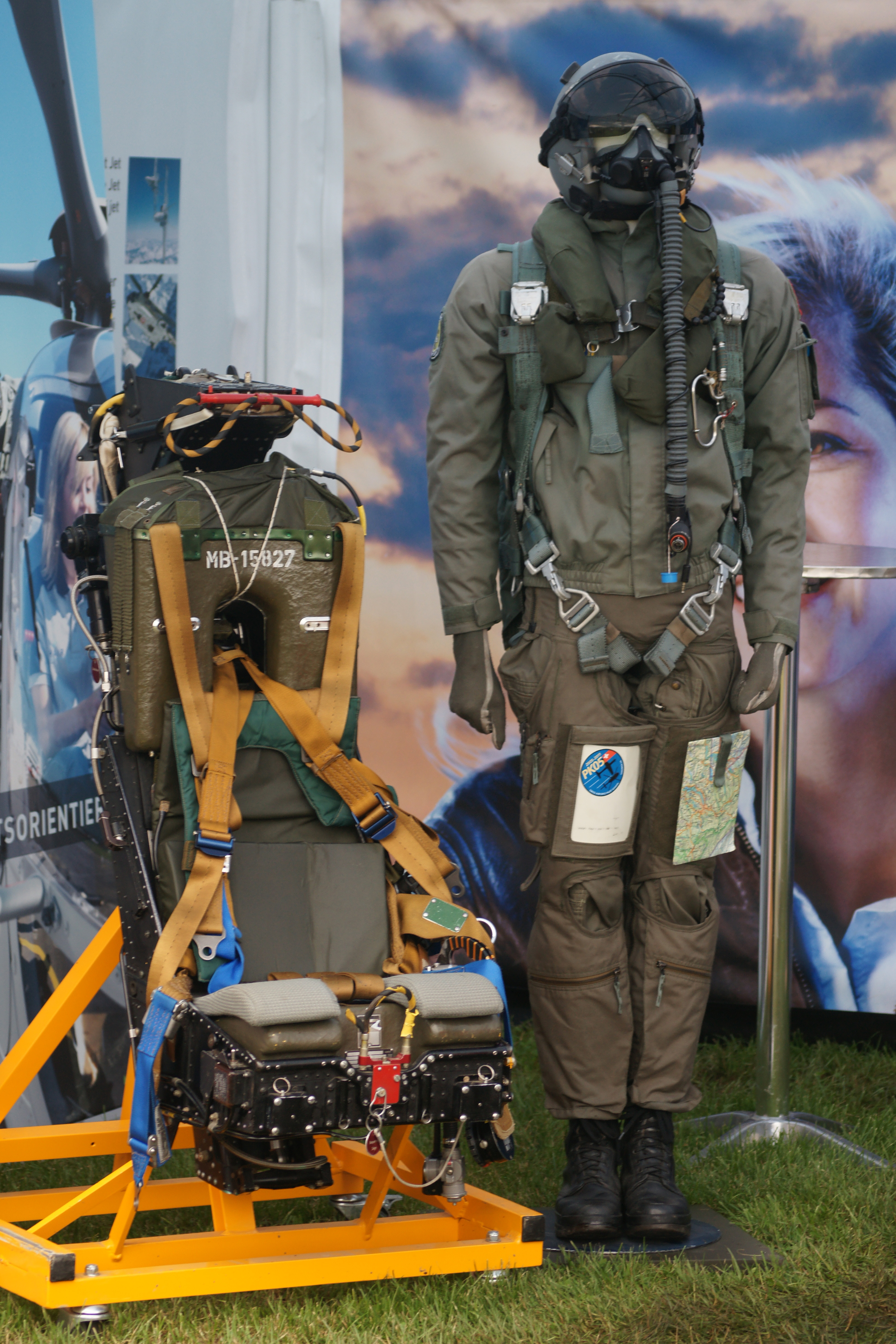
Swiss Air Force flight suit and fighter pilot equipment, 2011

The current flight suit that is standard for most air forces and navies is made of Nomex, a fabric made from spun aramid that is lightweight and fire-resistant. The flame-retardant capabilities of this material make it ideal for protecting aviators in case of a fire. The suit is often green or desert tan in color, with multiple pockets for specific pieces of gear (such as a clear plastic pocket on the thigh intended to house a map of the aircraft's planned flight path), but color, style, and cut vary greatly from country to country. The current model flight suit for the US military is the CWU 27/P and is available in sage green and desert tan. Commercial flight suits for civilian flying are also available, and are frequently used by helicopter crew (including non-pilots such as flight engineers, paramedics, and nurses), aerobatic pilots, and others who desire a practical "uniform".

Although there are multiple pockets on the current CWU 27/P flight suit, all pockets are placed on the front of the flight suit or on the arms or legs. There are no pockets on the back of the flight suit. This design allows easier access to the pockets while the wearer is sitting (such as in the cockpit of an aircraft), and ensures that the wearer in a seated position does not have to sit on any items in a back pocket (such as a wallet).

Members of the United States Marine Corps wore flight suits during most vehicle patrols and ground combat operations in Iraq and Afghanistan, because their standard camouflage utilities were not flame-resistant. Flight suits have now been phased out among ground personnel with the introduction of the Flame Resistant Organizational Gear (FROG) suit, which resembles the standard camouflage utilities.

== Space flight ==
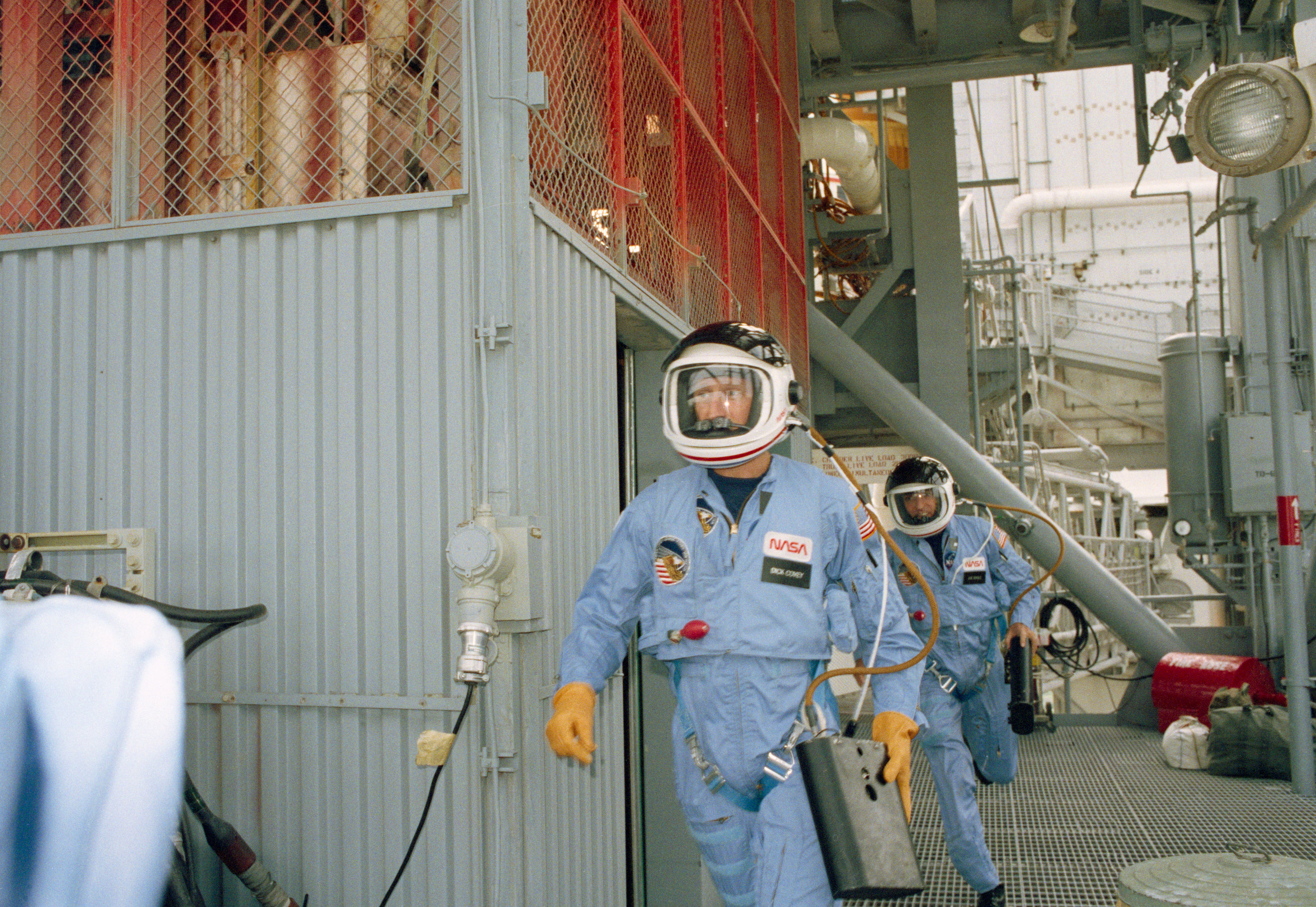
Astronauts Richard O. Covey (front) and Joe H. Engle rush from the Discovery during emergency launch-mode egress training at Kennedy Space Center.

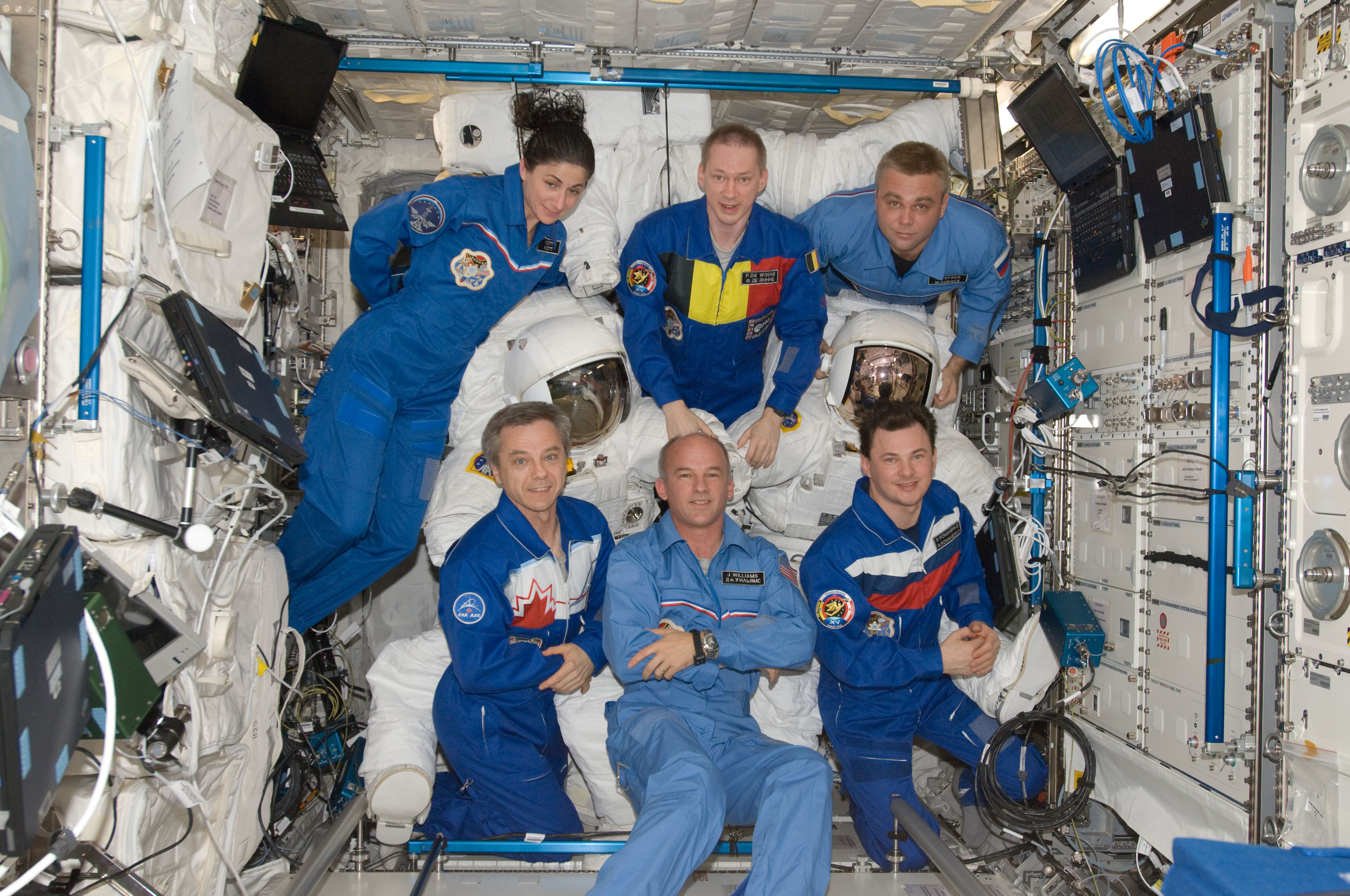
Expedition 21 crew members pose with three Extravehicular Mobility Unit spacesuits in the Columbus laboratory of the International Space Station.

NASA astronauts have worn one-piece flight suits when in training or on flights inside of NASA training aircraft. The current flight suit worn by astronauts is royal blue, made of Nomex. The now-common "shirt-sleeve environment" of the orbiting Space Shuttle and International Space Station has resulted in much more casual attire during spaceflight, such as shorts and polo shirts.

From STS-5 to STS-51-L, crews wore light blue flight suits and an oxygen helmet during launch/reentry. Apollo crews wore white 2-piece beta cloth uniforms during non-essential activities and the full A7L pressure suit during launch, trans-lunar injection, lunar ascent/descent, and extravehicular activity. Mercury and Gemini crews wore their space suits for the duration of the mission, with the exception of Gemini 7.

Pilots and flight crews use several colors of flight suit. NASA crews, for example, wear blue flight suits as a sort of functional dress uniform during training. The orange suits that they wear during launch and re-entry/landing are designed for high visibility, should there be an emergency recovery. White suits are worn during space walks to control temperature. NASA non-astronaut flight crew at Langley Research Center wear blue, and crew at the Dryden Flight Research Center wear either green or desert tan, and all newer suits issued are desert tan.

== See also ==
- Index of aviation articles
- Military rank
- Jumpsuit
- Pocket check list
- Pressure suit
