= Cheval =

Cheval may refer to:

- Cheval, Florida, United States
- Cheval tree, a tree native to North Agalega Island
- Cheval mirror, a full-length floor-standing mirror mounted in a frame that allows it to swing freely
- Cheval, loan word from French meaning horse meat

== People with the surname ==
- Christophe Cheval (born 1971), French sprinter
- Ferdinand Cheval (1836–1924), French postman

== See also ==
- Chaval (disambiguation)
