= Jane F. Barry =

American writer

- Born: Jane Frances Barry; 15 September 1966 (age 59); Boston, Massachusetts, United States
- Known for: Human rights writing and humanitarian work
- Children: 2

Jane Barry (born 15 September 1966, Boston, United States) is an American international women's rights author and the Linksbridge Foundation's Executive Director living on Bainbridge Island, Washington, United States.

== Early career ==
Barry studied Soviet Studies at Middlebury College, Vermont before moving to California and working on Soviet-American co-operation issues as part of the emerging citizen diplomacy movement, with organisations including the Esalen Institute Soviet-American Exchange Program; just as the Iron Curtain began to fall.

She worked in the former Soviet Union between 1989 and 1994, taking part in counter-demonstrations to the attempted 1991 coup d'etat against Mikhail Gorbachev and in support of democracy; being one of the first foreigners to join the human shield outside the Moscow White House.

== Humanitarian work ==
In 1991, she joined CARE USA, working in Russia on HIV/AIDS issues and other former Soviet republics including Tajikistan and Georgia during their break-away conflicts.

In 1995, CARE USA posted her to Rwanda to work in the aftermath of the 1994 Rwandan genocide.

From 1995 to 1998, Barry worked in Bosnia and Liberia for CARE before leaving the organisation to become an independent consultant.

== Policy work and women's rights ==
In her more recent career, she has worked in Côte d'Ivoire, Iraq, Sierra Leone, Chechnya, Kosovo, and South Africa for Save the Children UK,Help Age International, the UK Department for International Development, and the Urgent Action Fund for Women's Human Rights.

Barry's written work has been translated into Albanian, French, Nepali, Serbo-Croatian, Sinhala, Spanish and Tamil, and required reading at Fordham University Institute of International Humanitarian Affairs. She has been described by the anti-war movement Women in Black as an "homage to women activists who are engaged throughout the world: from Europe across Africa and Asia to Latin America".

Since 2008, Jane Barry has worked as a principal at the Seattle office of the consulting firm Linksbridge.

== Publications ==
Jane Barry's recent published works include:

- A Bridge Too Far: Aid Agencies and the Military in Humanitarian Response (2002)
- Rising up in Response (2005)
- What's the Point of the Revolution if We Can't Dance? (2007)
- Insiste, Persiste, Resiste, Existe (2008)
