= Ruth Fremson =

American photographer and journalist

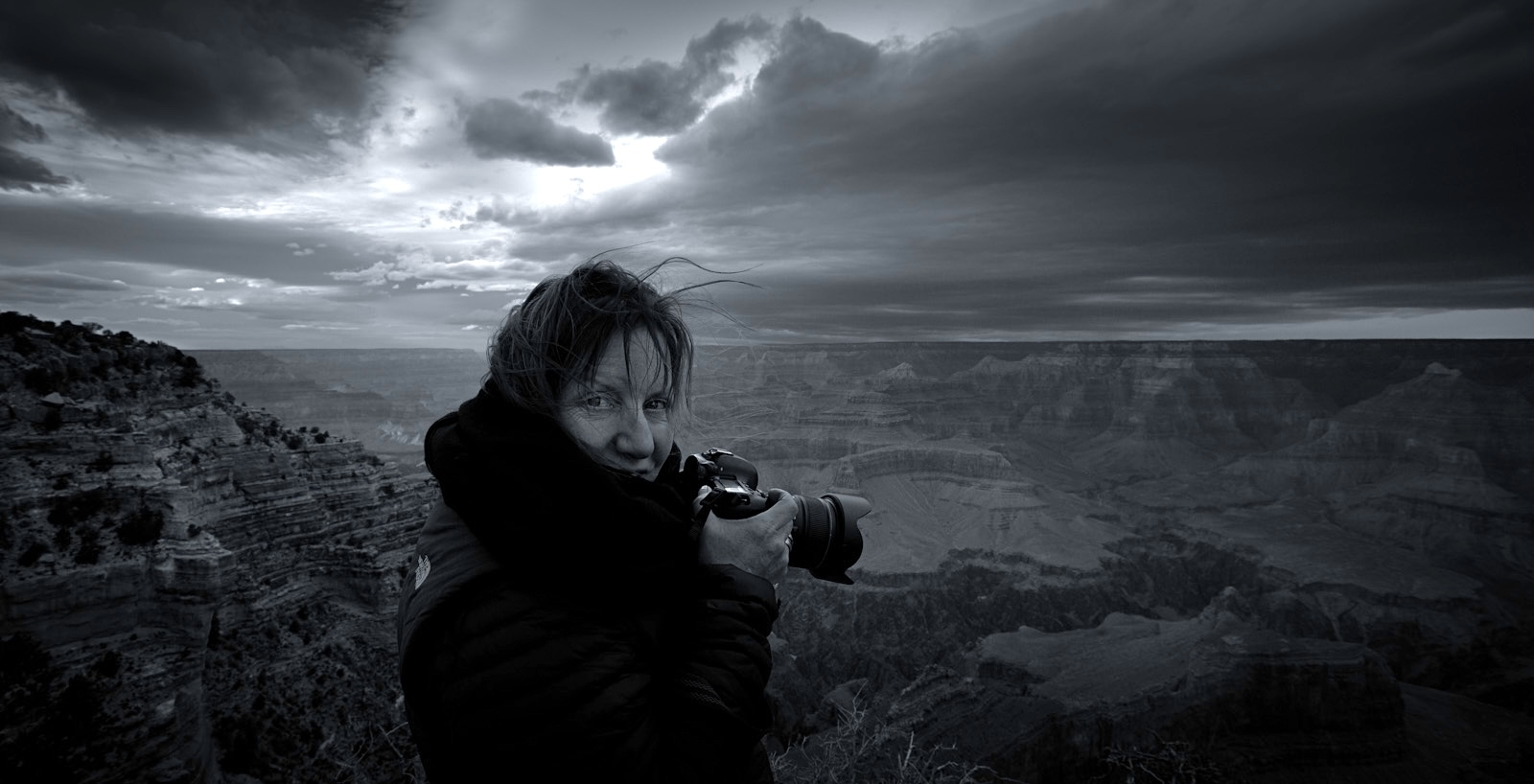
- Ruth Fremson at the Grand Canyon
- Employer: The New York Times
- Spouse: John Scurlock (m. 2016)
- Awards: Multiple Pulitzer Prizes (with others)

Ruth Fremson is an American photojournalist and staff photographer for The New York Times.

== Personal life ==
Fremson was born on Long Island, in New York. She is now married to pilot and aerial photographer John Scurlock. Together they live on Bainbridge Island, Washington.

== Career ==
She previously lived in New York City, where she was a photographer of the 9/11 attacks. She notably photographed Ground Zero in the immediate aftermath of the attacks on the World Trade Center. She has also travelled to Pakistan, Afghanistan, and Iraq to document conflicts in the region.

Fremson is a graduate of the Newhouse School of Syracuse University, where she completed a Bachelor's degree. She went on to join a Master's program at Ohio University.

After graduating from Syracuse, she worked an internship for The Washington Times in the summer of 1988. From 1989, she worked as staff for the Times until she joined the Associated Press (AP) in 1994. While working for AP, she covered multiple international events, including the reinstatement of Haitian president Jean-Bertrand Aristide, the end of the Bosnian Civil War, and the visit of Pope John Paul II to Cuba in 1998. She was hired by The New York Times in 2000.

In 2016, she appeared on the B&H Photo podcast.

== Awards ==
- 1999 Pulitzer Prize – Feature Photography (with the Associated Press)
- 2002 Pulitzer Prize – Feature Photography (with The New York Times)
- 2002 Pulitzer Prize – Breaking News Photography (with The New York Times)
