= Chaval Outdoor =

American heated clothing company

- Company type: Private
- Industry: Apparel
- Founded: 2012; 14 years ago
- Headquarters: Bainbridge Island, Washington, United States
- Products: Heated clothing
- Website: www.chavalusa.com

Chaval is a privately owned American company that designs and manufactures heated clothing. The company makes heated gloves for Alpine skiing, Freeskiing, and winter sport activity.

The company's headquarters are in Bainbridge Island, Washington.

== History ==
The company's heated gloves and technology has been reviewed by various media sources including Men's Journal, Financial Times and Octane gloves.

Polymer Solutions named the heating technology as one of "Top 25 Innovations Made With Polymers" in 2013.

== See also ==
- Wearable technology
- Raynaud's phenomenon
