= Buy Nothing Project =

Social experiment and global conglomeration of community-based groups

The Buy Nothing Project
- Founded: 2013; 13 years ago
- Founders: Rebecca Rockefeller, Liesl Clark
- Founded at: Bainbridge Island, Washington, U.S.
- Legal status: Benefit corporation
- Members: 7.5 million
- Website: www.buynothingproject.org

The Buy Nothing Project is a global conglomeration of community-based groups, founded in Bainbridge Island, Washington, in 2013, that encourages giving (or recycling) of consumer goods and services (called "gifts of self") in preference to conventional commerce.

The stated aim of the Buy Nothing Project is "to build resilient communities where our true wealth is the connections forged between neighbors". It began as a Facebook campaign, (now existing both on Facebook and as a standalone, separate app) and has built up local groups in the US and other countries, claiming over 4,000 volunteers and 7.5 million community members.

== Controversy ==
The Buy Nothing Project began enforcing its trademark in late 2025, leading to the shutdown of many independent Facebook gifting groups that used the term "Buy Nothing". The organization stated it was protecting its intellectual property, though the move comes after its app with a paid option, which was launched in 2022. Consequently, many affected groups changed their names to continue operating independently. Some groups were able to get reinstated by Facebook under a new name.

== Global and local impact ==
On a local level, each Buy Nothing Project group can sometimes contribute to local waste prevention and waste reduction efforts by reducing the need for people to buy new goods, but the actual impact of local Buy Nothing Project groups has not been measured or surveyed.

The project website notes that because the map of groups was based on existing neighborhood boundaries, and those boundaries have been influenced by socioeconomic differences and practices such as redlining, the map "began to align with unjust boundaries, including historic redlining, and this alignment amplified these injustices". In the summer of 2020, the project went through an "equity overhaul" to diversify the local groups. The leader of one in Minneapolis, Minnesota said, "It's been hard to diversify our groups, because our groups reflect our neighborhoods and our neighborhoods are largely segregated in Minneapolis".

Globally, the Buy Nothing Project has been featured by print/online media in USA (see references), UK, Asia and Australia, as well as video media such as this report by CBS Mornings: CBS: "Buy Nothing Project" groups offering more than just gifts. With the advent of the Buy Nothing mobile app, membership is possible wherever one is situated in the world and geographic boundaries no longer matter for travellers who want to participate outside of the area where they reside.

== Organization and goals ==
The Buy Nothing Project encourages local communities to focus on improving the community in which they live and keep groups small and local to minimize distance traveled to pick up items. There is no overt criticism of consumerism, but the project's goals include saving money and reducing waste. The projects' co-founders, Rebecca Rockefeller and Liesl Clark, say that it is not just recycling; it is a way to fuel the gift economy and build community.

Members are expected to follow the rules and mission statement of the project, although in the traditional iteration, via Facebook groups the group leaders or moderators may choose to tailor the rules to better suit their local community of the type of project they wish to coordinate.

Membership is restricted to persons of legal age as prescribed by the laws of each group's geographic location.
