= Awaken the Empire =

American rock band

- Origin: Seattle, Washington, U.S.
- Genres: Alternative rock, alternative metal
- Years active: 2009–2018
- Labels: Another Century, Century Media, Sony Music Entertainment, Burn the Records!
- Members: Damien Lawson Daryl Falconer Shivan Somaratne Romina Fronti
- Website: awakentheempire.com

Awaken the Empire is an American alternative rock band from Seattle, Washington.

== History ==
Awaken the Empire was founded in 2009 in Los Angeles by singer/songwriter Damien Lawson.

The band later relocated to Seattle, Washington. The group has toured throughout the US and has shared the stage with acts including Slipknot, Breaking Benjamin, Motionless in White, 10 Years and I Prevail

On February 8, 2011, Awaken the Empire released their debut EP The Awakening EP. The band released a video for their first single Know Your Place on April 27, 2011. In August 2011, Awaken the Empire was chosen to perform an unsigned showcase at The Roxy included in the Sunset Strip Music Festival. On November 3, 2011, the band's second single and video for "The Awakening" premiered exclusively on AOL Noisecreep. The video was shot in Los Angeles by director Chad Michael Ward. In November 2011, the band went into the studio to record their debut album with the record producer Erik Ron. On December 17, 2011, Awaken the Empire played Kill Hannah's New Heart For Xmas 8 at the Bottom Lounge in Chicago, Illinois.

On February 15, 2012, the band premiered the single "Cross My Heart" exclusively on the Alternative Press magazine website. On March 22, 2012, the band released the single "Rise and Fall" exclusively on the American Music Press Magazine website. On June 11, 2012, the single "Saviour" was exclusively premiered on the Hot Topic website.

On June 18, 2012, MTV premiered the video for Rise and Fall. Due to a positive viewer response, MTV featured Awaken the Empire on the front page of MTV.com under the heading of "What's About to Pop". Within 24 hours, the video peaked at the number 5 most popular music video on MTV.com. The video also peaked at the Number 1 "Most Commented Video" and the Number 1 "Most Shared Video". In June 2012, the band announced that they would be opening for Eyes Set to Kill on the Show Your True Colors 2012 North American Tour. While on tour with Eyes Set to Kill, Awaken the Empire's Van, with all of their gear, merchandise, and belongings was stolen in San Antonio, Texas. The band was forced to drop off the tour.

On February 19, 2013, Awaken the Empire announced that they had signed with Century Media Records, and that the single "Rise and Fall" would officially be released via iTunes on March 5, 2013. On March 5, 2013, Awaken the Empire released "Rise and Fall" for free on their Facebook page as part of their signing with Century Media Records, and the "Rise And Fall" game was also announced on their page for fans to download and play while "Rise and Fall" plays in the background, seemingly to go along with the release of the song.

On December 18, 2014, Awaken the Empire premiered their new track "Insomniacs Unite" on Loudwire.com. On April 8, 2015, Alternative Press premiered the video for "Insomniacs Unite". On May 6, 2015, the band announced the upcoming release of their debut album Aurora. The album was set to be released through Another Century on July 24. Awaken the Empire also announced they will be playing on the "When the Sky Cracks Open Tour" with 10 Years, Nonpoint and The Family Ruin.

On July 24, 2015, Awaken the Empire released their debut album "Aurora" through Another Century Records, an imprint of Century Media Records and Sony Music Entertainment

== Members ==
- Damien Lawson – lead vocals, guitar, programming (2009–present)
- Shivan Somaratne – guitar (2010–present)
- Romina Fronti – bass, backing vocals (2013–present)
- Daryl Falconer – drums, percussion (2010–present)

=== Former members ===
- Jaymz Marcc – bass
- Kris Escalante – drums

== Discography ==
=== Albums ===
- 2015: Aurora

=== Singles and EPs ===
- 2011: The Awakening EP
- 2011: "Know Your Place" (digital only)
- 2011: "The Awakening"
- 2013: "Rise and Fall" (digital only)
