= Heated clothing =

Functional clothing

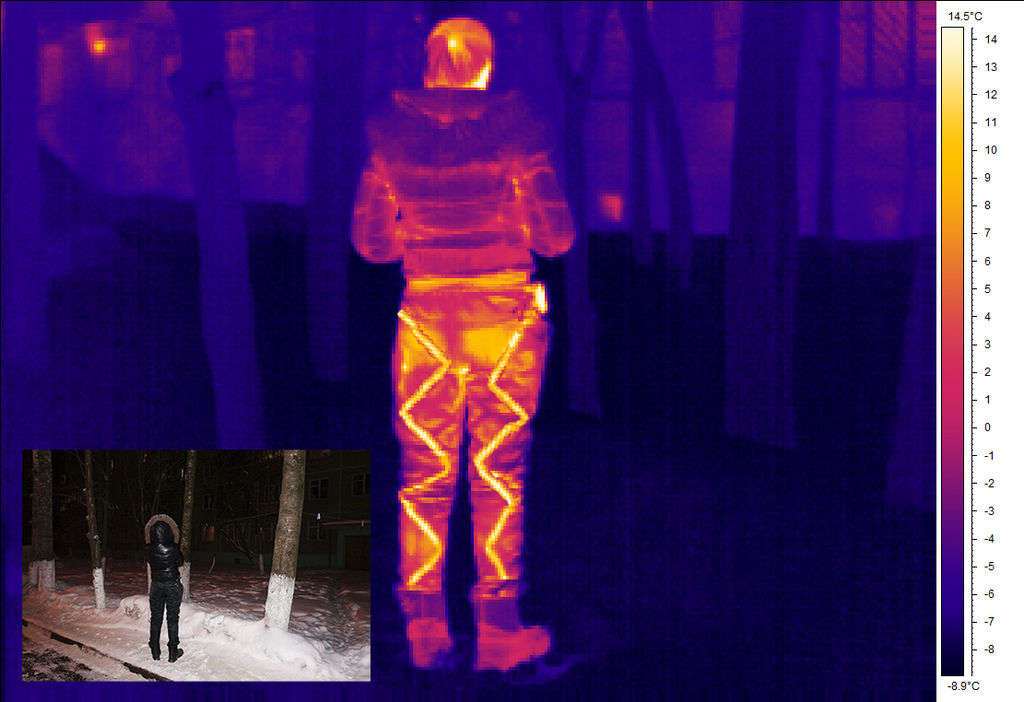
Carbon tape heated trousers on Instructables

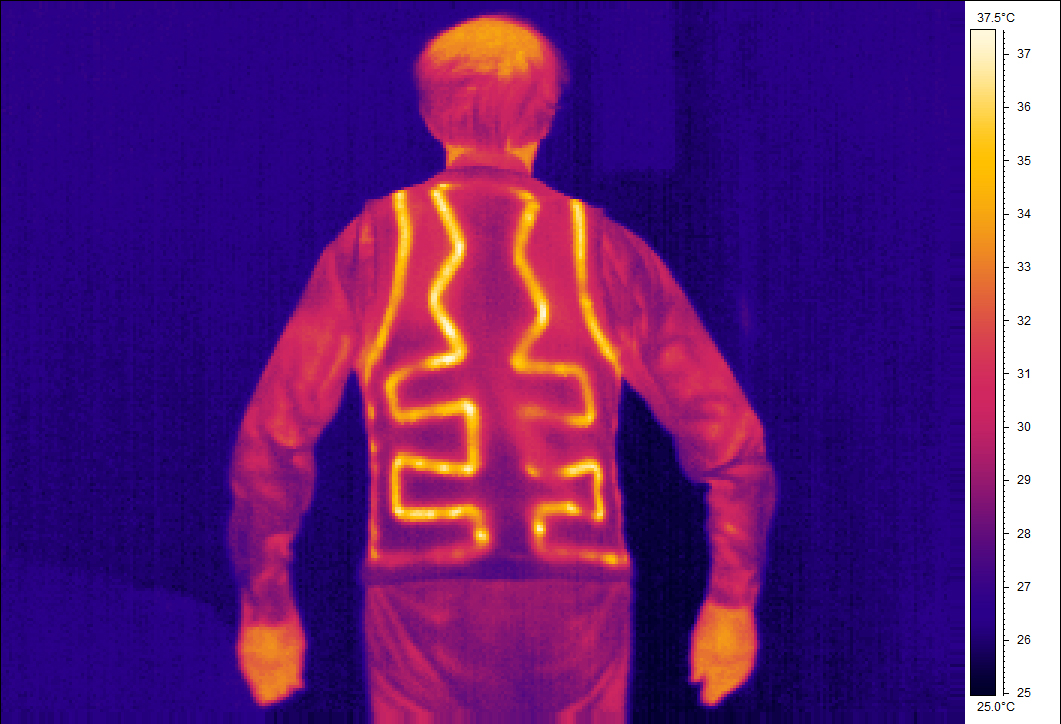
Heated jacket

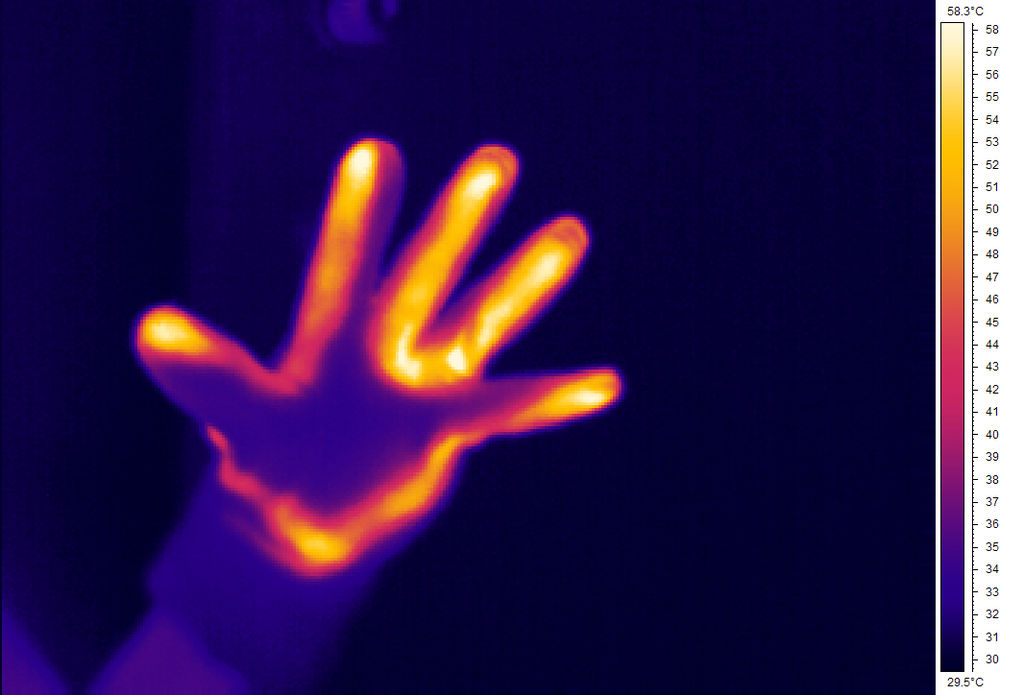
Heated glove

Most heated clothing is designed for cold-weather sports and activities, such as motorcycle riding, downhill skiing, diving, winter biking, and snowmobiling, trekking and for outdoor workers such as construction workers and carpenters. Since the London Olympics, heated clothing has also been used by athletes to keep their muscles warm between the warm-up and the race.

Normal insulation works by trapping body heat, so if it gets wet from sweat or rain, or if a person stops exercising, the insulation may not keep them warm. With heated garments, a person can keep warm even if they are resting and not producing heat, or if their coat is damp from sweat.

== Types ==
There are many types of heated clothing. Most notably these use 12, 7.4, and 5-volt powerbanks.

The 5-volt powerbank allows one to use a common powerbank for both heating apparel and charging personal electronics.

The 7.4-volt battery is the most common type of heated clothing battery system, and may be rechargeable. The most popular items sold have traditionally been heated gloves and jackets.

12-volt batteries are designed for use with motorcycles, ATVs, or snowmobiles, and draw their power from the vehicle's battery. As these use a higher voltage than 7.4v systems, they are more powerful and therefore heat a larger area at a higher temperature. Most brands using 12v systems are compatible. For instance, most 12v heated jackets come with built-in power cords that come out at the wrists to power heated gloves/liners and out from the bottom to power heated pants/liners. The pants then have cords coming from the bottom of each leg to power socks/liners/insoles.

Most 7.4v garments will power for around 2-8 hours depending on heat setting and outside conditions. Many jackets and vests can be powered for almost double this time with an extended-life battery, available separately.

=== By function ===
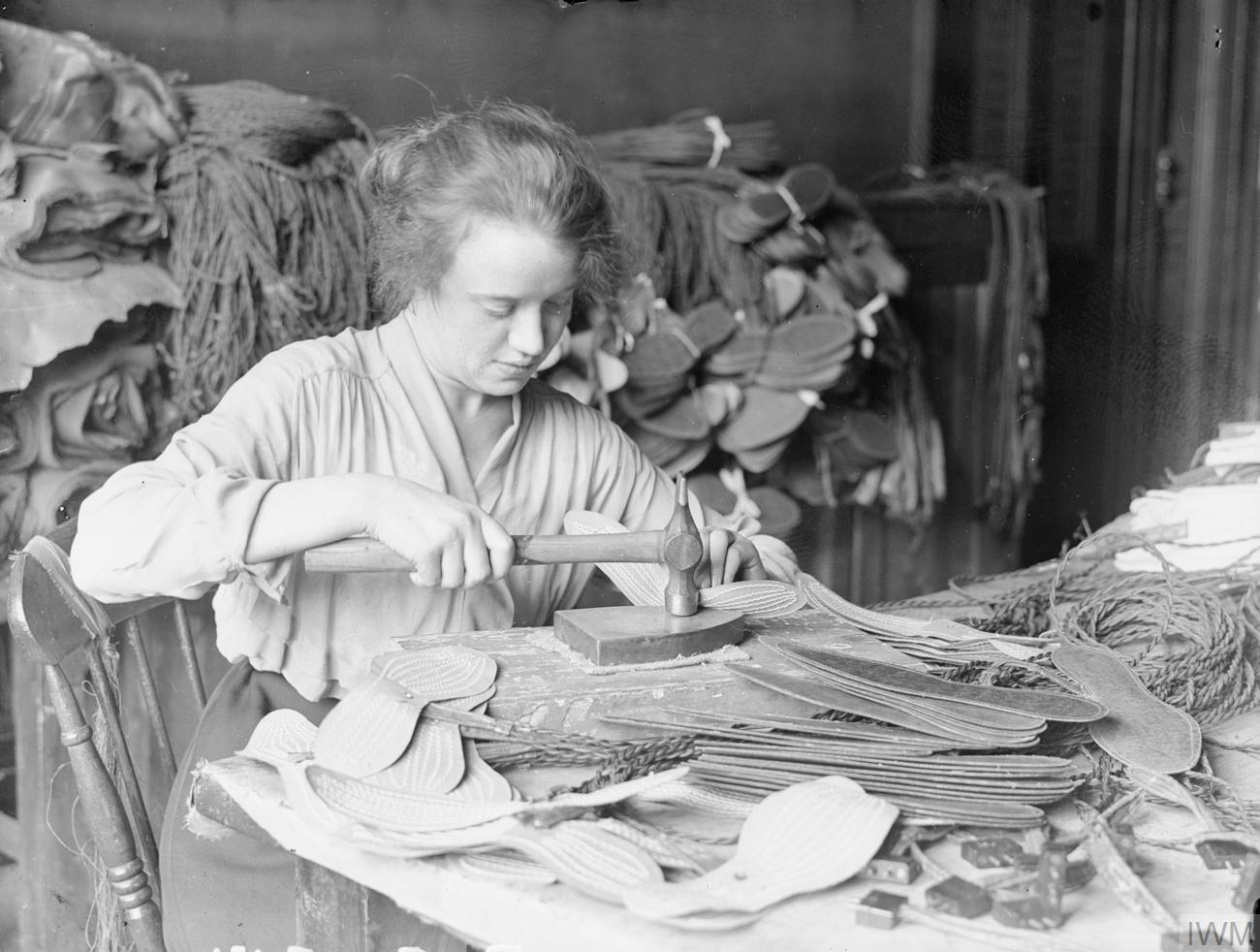
A factory worker preparing the soles of electrically heated boots during World War I

The most widely available types of heated clothing are products for the extremities; the hands and feet. These parts are the most likely to suffer frostbite or frostnip in severe cold. As such, many manufacturers make heated gloves, mittens, socks, and boot liners, which can be purchased at workers' supply stores (serving construction workers) and motor sports stores. Heated torso coverings like vests, jackets, or leggings are available from specialty retailers that cater to motorcyclists and downhill skiers.

Related products are heated seat covers, throws, and seating pads. Heated seat covers for snowmobiles, motorcycles, and cars and heated throw blankets typically use electrical 12-volt heating elements. Heated seating pads for hunting, canoeing, and stadium use either have rechargeable batteries or use reheatable gel packs.

In a joint project of adidas, British Cycling and Loughborough University's Environmental Ergonomics Research Centre, the use of heated clothing for reducing the muscle temperature drop in athletes between their warm-up period and the actual race was investigated, and the 'adidas hot pants' were used by the track cycling team at the London Olympics with great success. The science behind this has been published in a series of papers by Faulkner et al., Wilkins and Havenith, and Raccuglia et al.

=== Technology ===
==== Electrical ====
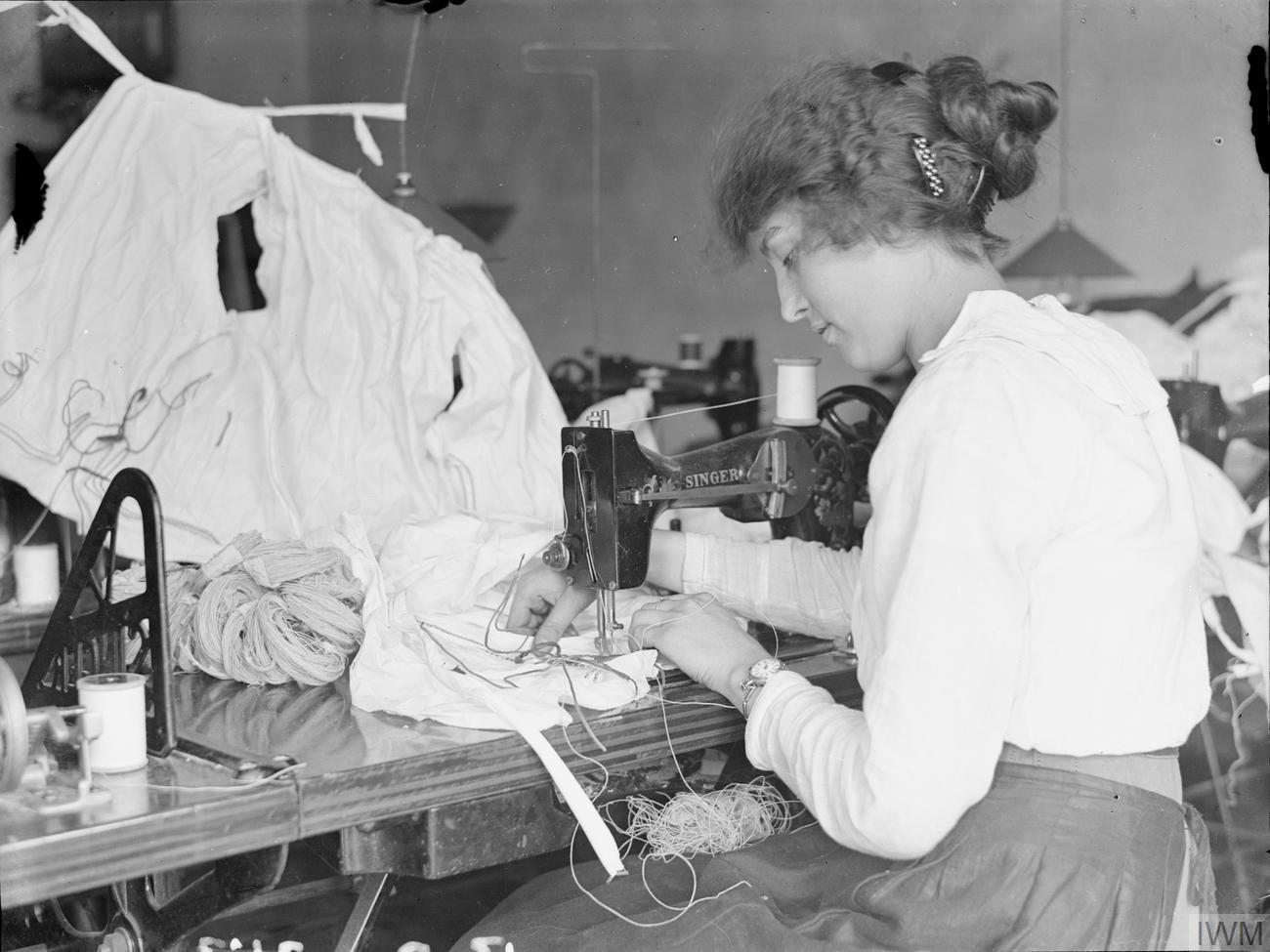
A factory worker sewing electric heating elements into coats for pilots during World War I

Heated clothing has tiny wires sewn into a layer of the fabric. These tiny wires are typically made of carbon fiber or a metal composite, like nickel-chromium, that performs well under repeated heating and cooling cycles. These wires are known as the heating element. Heated clothing designed for use on vehicles such as motorbikes or snowmobiling typically use a 12 volt DC electrical supply, the standard EMF ('voltage') on motorsport and powersport batteries. While a single heated garment, such as heated gloves, will not usually adversely affect the charge on the battery, riders have to be careful about attaching several heated garments because the battery may not be able to handle the load. The heated garments are usually attached directly onto the battery of the bike. Some heated garments have cigarette lighter plugs. While the least expensive models can only be turned on or off, more expensive models sometimes provide a heating level control.

For downhill skiing or winter biking, rechargeable nickel metal or lithium batteries are generally used.

The most reliable systems have technologies that have redundancy in case of a heating element breakage.

The controller and battery in some models can be detached so that the garment can be worn as a regular garment.

==== Stored heat ====
Garments that use gel have cloth pouches or pockets where plastic packages of the gel can be inserted in the garment. Prior to going outdoors, the gel is heated in a microwave. Once outdoors, the gel pack retains its heat for 30 minutes to two hours, depending on the size of the gel pack, the thickness of the insulation protecting the gel pack from the outdoor temperatures, and wind conditions.

==== Chemical ====
Chemical reaction-based garments have cloth pouches or pockets, where single-use packages of chemical hand warmers can be inserted. The warmers are about the size of a package of cards, and they contain chemicals which produce heat. One traditional hand warmer is a small metal box containing charcoal which, when lit, burns very slowly and produces a mild heat. Disposable heat packs typically contain cellulose, iron, water, activated carbon, vermiculite, and salt. When these packs are exposed to air, an exothermic chemical reaction occurs, which provides several hours of heat. Another chemical heating pad uses a solution of supersaturated sodium acetate that can be crystallized by bending a small metal disk, thus producing heat. This reaction is reversible by heating the pouch in water to dissolve the sodium acetate again. While these products are commonly called "hand warmers", they can be placed in boots or, with special garments such as vests, in cloth pockets on the inside of the garment. The warmth produced by these tends to be lowest among the above heating methods.

== See also ==
- Electric blanket
- List of battery sizes
