= J. H. Baxter and Co. =

American wood products treatment company

J. H. Baxter & Co. is an American wood products treatment company founded in 1896 and incorporated in 1915. The company produces railroad ties, and utility poles and crossarms.

== History ==
J. H. Baxter & Co. began as a lumber wholesaler in San Francisco in 1896. After the 1906 San Francisco Earthquake, Baxter began distributing timber to sawmills on the West Coast using its own sailing ships. Later, it shipped wood using steamships.

The company was incorporated and began producing preserved wood in 1915.

The company has been owned by four successive generations of the Baxter family.

== Products ==
The company treats wood with creosote and pentachlorophenol (PCP) to make products such as railroad ties, and utility poles and crossarms. Some of Baxter's products were branded Baxco.

== Plants ==
=== Eugene, Oregon ===
Baxter's Eugene, Oregon plant is located in a mixed industrial/residential zone of the Bethel neighborhood. Baxter began treating wood at the plant in 1943. In the 1980s, the Oregon Department of Environmental Quality began investigating the plant's use of chemicals. The plant was closed in 2022.

=== Weed, California ===
The former J. H. Baxter plant in Weed, California is a Superfund cleanup site. Wood preservation activities began at the plant in 1937. The Weed plant was partially owned by Roseburg Forest Products.

=== Other locations ===
As of 2023, other locations included Alameda and San Mateo, California, and its TimberWood Products division in Brookline, New Hampshire.

== Memberships ==
- Concatenated Order of Hoo-Hoo

== See also ==
- Charles R. McCormick Lumber Company, McCormick partnered with J. H. Baxter's nephew to form McCormick & Baxter Creosoting Company
- Pacific Creosoting Company, once part of J. H. Baxter; one iteration was Baxter-Wycoff Company
