= Carrier Dove =

Carrier Dove was the name of several North American ships:

- Carrier Dove, an 1854 schooner that sank in Lake Ontario
- Carrier Dove (clipper), an 1855 California clipper ship
- Carrier Dove (1857 schooner), built in Wilmington, North Carolina
- Carrier Dove (1869 barque) built in Saint John, New Brunswick
- Carrier Dove (1884 schooner), built in Essex, Massachusetts
- Carrier Dove (schooner), an 1890 four-masted lumber and fishing schooner built by the Hall Brothers
