= Wapama (steam schooner) =

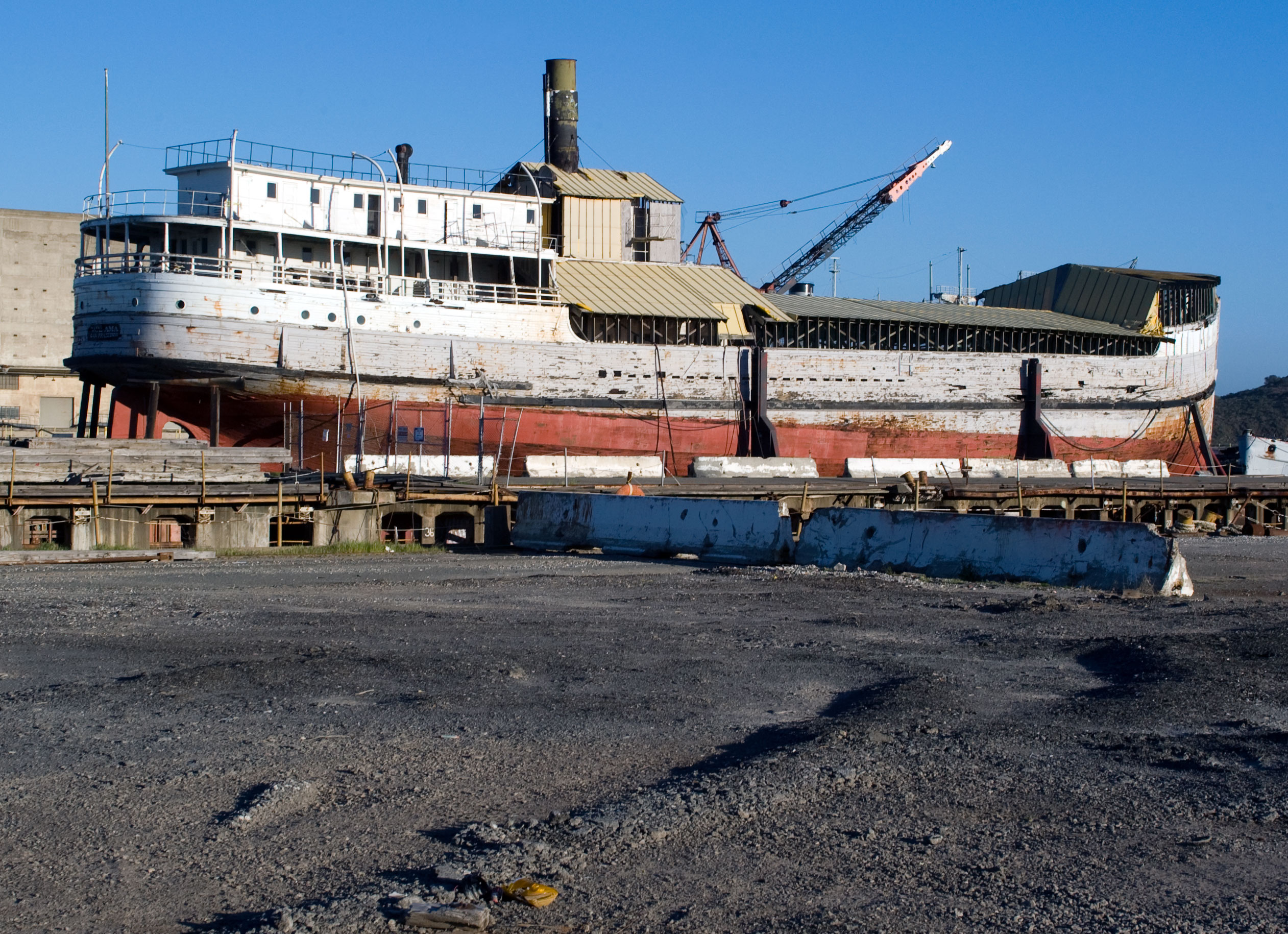
- Steam schooner Wapama in Richmond Shipyard, February 2006

History
- Name: Wapama (1915–1938); Tongass (1938–c.1963); Wapama (c.1963–2013)
- Launched: 1915
- Fate: Dismantled in August 2013

General characteristics
- Tonnage: 945 (gross), 524 (net)
- Length: 216.91 ft (66.11 m)
- Beam: 42.33 ft (12.90 m)
- Depth: 19 ft (5.8 m)
- Installed power: 825 hp (615 kW) triple-expansion steam engine
- Capacity: 1,000,000 board feet (2,000 m^{3}) of lumber
- Wapama (steam schooner)
- Formerly listed on the U.S. National Register of Historic Places
- Former U.S. National Historic Landmark
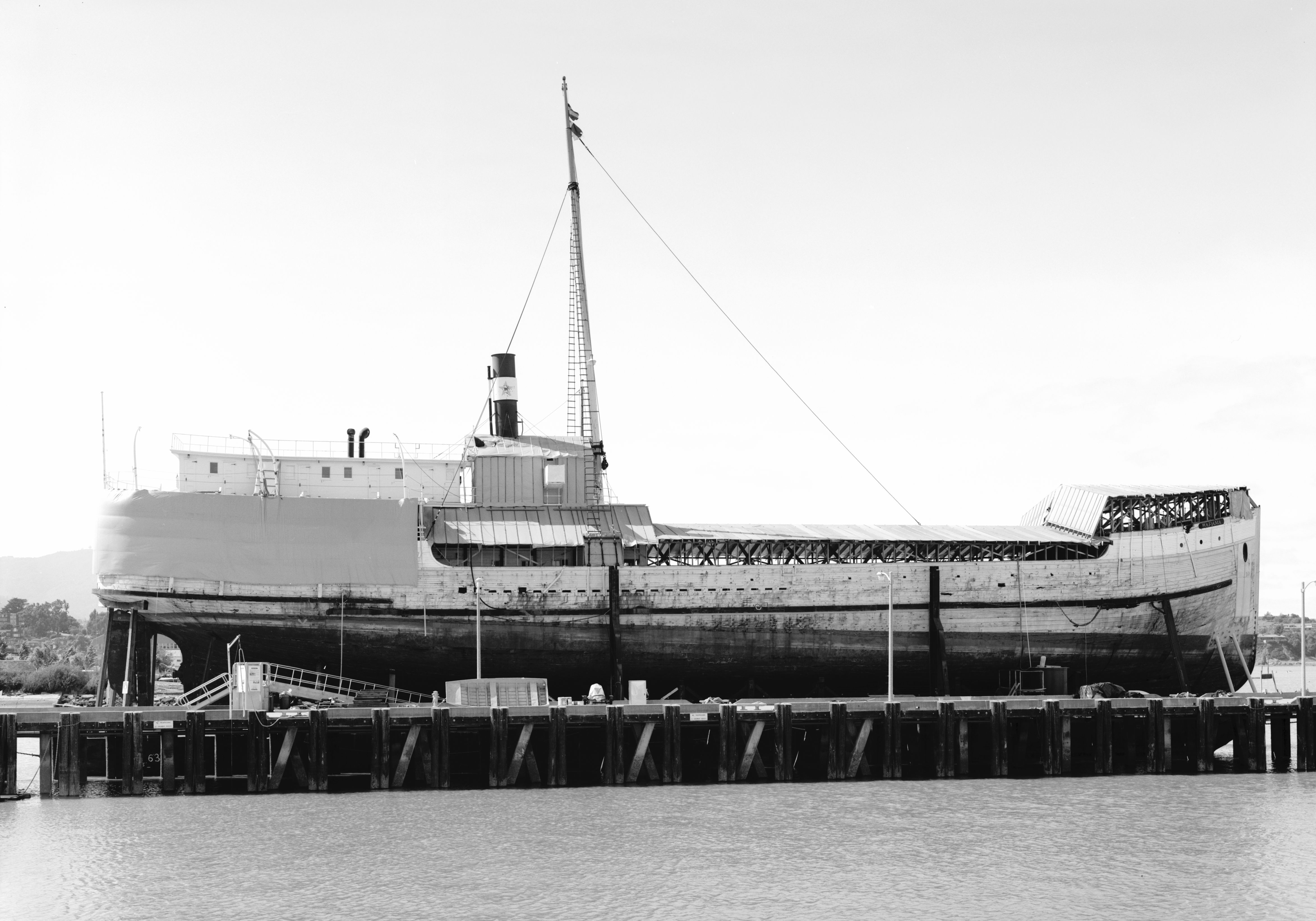

- Location within California
- Location: Richmond, California
- Coordinates: 37°54′21.1″N 122°22′0″W
- Built: 1915
- Architects: James H. Price; St. Helens Shipbuilding Co.
- NRHP reference No.: 73000228

Significant dates
- Added to NRHP: 24 April 1973
- Designated NHL: 20 April 1984
- Removed from NRHP: 27 February 2015
- Delisted NHL: 27 February 2015

Wapama, also known as Tongass, was a vessel last located in Richmond, California. She was the last surviving example of some 225 wooden steam schooners that served the lumber trade and other coastal services along the Pacific Coast of the United States. She was managed by the National Park Service at San Francisco Maritime National Historical Park until dismantled in August 2013.

Wapama was designated a National Historic Landmark in 1984; the designation was withdrawn in 2015.

== Design ==
Wapama was a two-masted, 216.91-foot-long (66.11 m) wooden schooner with a 42.33-foot (12.90 m) beam and a depth of 19-foot (5.8 m), net tonnage of 524, but a gross tonnage of 945. The Wapama was constructed in by St. Helens Shipbuilding Company, a subsidiary of the Charles McCormick Lumber Company, on Sauvie Island in Columbia County, Oregon in 1915. James Price was the master builder of the ship and oversaw a crew of 85–100 men at the company during the time of the Wapama's construction. The shipyard launched the incomplete Wapama, described as "little more than a finished hull", in a celebration on January 20, 1915. The ship was then towed to San Francisco by the Klamath for completion, but the ship drifted free during the tow and had to be caught by the tug Goliah of Merchants and Shipowners. The tow was completed by the first ship built by the St. Helens Shipbuilding Company, the Multnomah. Through February and March 1915, Main Street Iron Works installed the engine whilst the accommodations for passengers and crew were also completed. The Wapama officially entered into the service of the McCormick Lumber Company on April 29, 1915 and it cost a total of $150,000. The San Francisco Examiner reported, "The vessel will have accommodations [sic] for forty-five cabin passengers and fifteen steerage. The lumber carrying capacity will be 1,100,000 board feet."

== Service ==
Early on, the ownership of the Wapama was operated by the Charles R. McCormick Lumber Company, but changed for legal or corporate reasons. In 1915, it was sold to the Wapama Steamship Company for $10 and evidence indicates that additional investors owned a stake in the ship. In November 1922, the ship was transferred to the McCormick Steamship Company, after all other shareholders were bought out. In September 1925, it was transferred to the Charles R. McCormick Lumber Company. Throughout its service in the McCormick company, the Wapama transported passengers and cargo from San Francisco to the Northwest. In the Northwest, the ship would load lumber and passengers before returning to San Francisco. The ship would occasionally tow other vessels, like the lumber schooner Alpena and the whaler Bowhead, but were opportunistic and done at sea. The crew originally numbered 31, but was consolidated to 26 in 1927.

The ship was sold to the Los Angeles-San Francisco Navigation Company of Claudine C. Gillespie, Albert E. Gillespie, and Charles Gillespie on May 20, 1930. It served as a passenger and cargo ship between the two cities and included a service that allowed passengers to transport their automobiles as well. It was sold to Erik Krag, president of the Viking Steamship Company, a subsidiary of Inter-Ocean Steamship Corporation, a company run by Erik Krag and Harry Brown, for $12,500 on April 20, 1937. The ship made two passenger runs, at lost, before it was sold to the Alaska Transportation Company for $27,000 on December 23, 1937.

Now under the ownership of the Alaska Transportation Company the ship was renamed the Tongass on February 4, 1938. The ship was refitted for cargo service by the Lake Union Dry Dock and Construction Company and completed in May 1938, the alterations raised the ship to 999 gross tons and 524 net tons. Only the record of its final run remains, but the ship carried "passengers, mail, and general cargo to Alaskan port towns and returned with a cargo mainly composed of frozen fish. The crews on the Alaska run usually numbered around thirty men and included a pilot and purser."

In 1948, it was sold to Jack Mendelsohn and Son for scrapping, but survived and was sold to the California Division of Beaches and Parks for $16,000 on January 10, 1958. Throughout its commercial service, the Wapama had several accidents and mishaps. On November 27, 1915, the ship grounded on silt in the Fraser River and was refloated only to ground again on December 6 in San Francisco, both times without damage. On May 17, 1917, the Wapama had a collision with the steamer Doris and a month later on June 16, grounded on mud near San Diego, both without damage. The first serious accident was in December 1932, when the masts were snapped during loading cargo. Another accident of unknown date resulted in "extensive damage" when the Wapama collided with a breakwater in Long Beach. On May 10, 1947, in Seattle there was a collision with the steamer Reff Knot that increased the leaking of the hull. A Coast Guard inspection on June 6, 1947, noted the hull was in fair condition, but the ship was going to be removed from service and later sold for scrap in 1948. The last mishap occurred in the 1950s in Seattle when a fire broke out in the engine room.

== Museum ship ==
In the 1950s, a group of California maritime enthusiasts formed the San Francisco Maritime Museum with the intention of preserving the history and ships of regional importance. Expertise was provided from the museum and funding from the state to acquire the C. A. Thayer and the Tongass. In January 1958, the Tongass was sold for $16,000 and its initial repairs were overseen by Captain Adrian Raynaud. The vessel was drydocked for two weeks in August and September 1958 to remove the old masts and inspect, clean and repair of the bottom of the vessel. The hull was caulked and painted, "camouflaging" yet assisting in the preservation of the ship until a proper restoration could be done. This "minimal amount" of work was done to make it seaworthy for the towing to California, but it still arrived with 8 feet (2.4 m) of water in the engine room. From 1959 to 1963, the Oakland Dock and Warehouse Company restored the ship and renamed it back to Wapama.

The San Francisco Maritime State Historical Park opened to the public on October 2, 1963, and the ship opened to the public as a museum ship on October 10, 1963. Within years of its opening, serious deterioration threatened the ship and became critical in August 1969 when a leak raised the rate at which it took on water to 600 gallons per hour and in strong winds to 1,000 gallons per hour. The ship's two pumps were capable of handling this flow, but two weeks later the leak doubled to 2,000 gallons per hour. In a dive, the leak was found and stanched with oakum and burlap and it was later reinforced to be fixed at the next dry docking, in November 1970. In October 1972, the United States Congress established the Golden Gate National Recreation Area and the San Francisco Maritime State Historical Park was intentionally included in its range. In September 1977, the State of California donated the park and the collections to the federal government and it was reorganized as the San Francisco Maritime National Historical Park. In 1979, the Wapama's condition had deteriorated to the point that significant repairs were needed to restore the ship's structural integrity and it was placed atop a barge.

The Wapama's continued dry rot and deterioration worsened until a new survey was done in 1982. Maynard Bray, the shipyard supervisor from Mystic Seaport in Connecticut, inspected the ship and recommended covering it as quickly as possible and building a "reasonably good-looking, fairly permanent shed with its sidewalls and ends supported directly from the deck of the barge." Bray concluded that a six-to-ten year restoration was needed to do a "decent restoration". On June 1, 1984, a report was made for a $3.62 million dollar restoration spanning four years, from 1986-1989. On June 7, it was reported that an allocation for $1,013,100 for fiscal year 1985 for the restoration and a celebration marking its National Historic Landmark status followed the next day. The restoration however was delayed due to concerns with costs and staffing, but a recommendation to build a protective cover was implemented. Constructed in December 1985 at a cost of $98,000, "the park opted for a partial roof resting on the vessel’s bulwarks that covered just the forecastle and main deck".

== Update ==
The National Park Service announced its intention to dismantle Wapama in a 19 May 2011, San Francisco Chronicle article, but it also had considered saving the steam engine. While a majority of bloggers responding to the article voiced dismay and/or support for preservation, a minority advocated burning the Wapama in a manner done to the last commercial Great Lakes sailing ship J T Wing at Belle Isle near the site of the present day Dossin Great Lakes Museum in Detroit.

Wapama's impending doom followed the fate of the lumber schooner Wawona (1897) of the Northwest Seaport, Seattle, Washington, which was broken up in 2009.

Not all listed historic wooden ships considered in need of major restoration in recent years have ended up being broken up. The lumber schooner C.A. Thayer (1895), also a NPS charge, was restored, although 80% of her wood was replaced through a restoration that lasted from 2004 to 2007. Mystic Seaport began a major restoration of the whaler Charles W. Morgan (1841) in 2009 to seaworthy status.

== Importance ==
Wapama was added to the National Register of Historic Places on 24 April 1973 and later designated a National Historic Landmark on 20 April 1984. It was historically significant as the last wooden-hulled survivor of approximately 235 steam schooners that operated in the Pacific Coast lumber trade. The Wapama had the ability to off-load its own cargo which was "an asset in the lumber trade, where ports were primitive and lacked shore facilities for cargo loading." Due to poor condition, the Wapama was slated for dismantling and the Historic American Engineering Record documented the ship through its dismantling to record the details of its construction. Pieces of the Wapama, including its engine, will be preserved and used to make a permanent interpretative exhibit at the San Francisco Maritime National Historical Park. In August 2013, the dismantling of the Wapama was completed. The ship's National Historic Landmark designation was withdrawn in 2015.

Five American wood steamboats survive, although three are much smaller than Wapama had been. They are the Virginia V (1922) of Seattle; the Sabino (1908), a former Maine boat now operated by Mystic Seaport; Minnehaha (1906), of Lake Minnetonka, Minnesota; Nenana (1933), an Alaskan stern-wheeler; and the railroad ferry Eureka (1890) a museum ship in San Francisco. The first three are screw steamers. The Steamer Virginia V Foundation undertook a $6.5-million stem-to-stern restoration of their charge, which lasted from 1995 to 2001.
