= Carrier Dove (schooner) =

4-masted schooner in the West coast lumber trade and in fishing

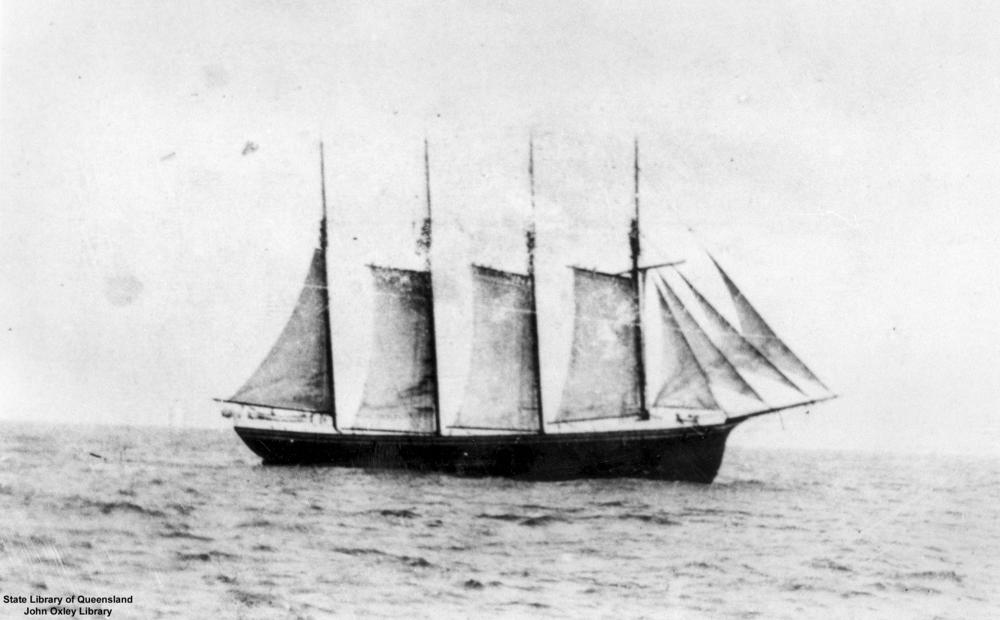
- Schooner Carrier Dove

History

United States
- Name: Carrier Dove
- Builder: Hall Brothers, Port Blakely, WA
- Launched: 1890
- Fate: Wrecked 21 November 1921

General characteristics
- Class & type: 4-masted schooner
- Tons burthen: 707 or 672 tons
- Length: 188 ft 7 in (57.48 m)
- Beam: 39 ft (12 m)
- Depth of hold: 14 ft 2 in (4.32 m)

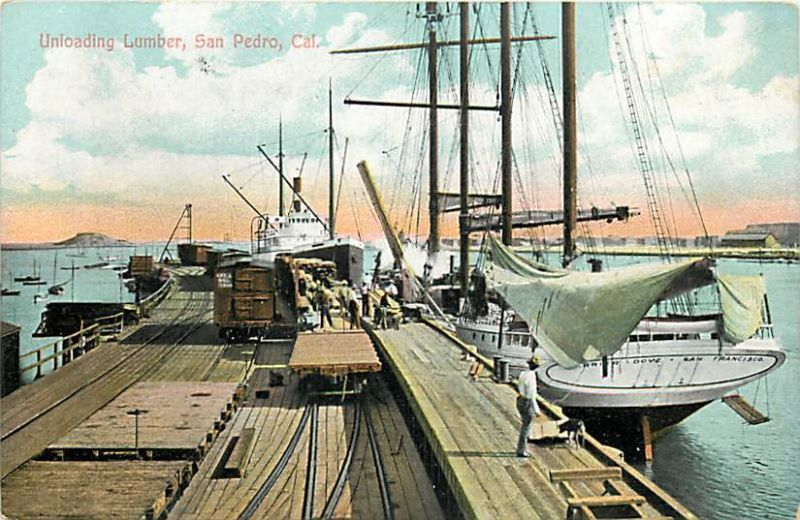
1912 - San Pedro, CA - 4 masted schooner Carrier Dove, dockside, unloading her wares

Carrier Dove was a four-masted schooner built by the Hall Brothers in Port Blakely in 1890. She worked in the West coast lumber trade and in fishing.

== Career of 1890 schooner Carrier Dove ==
In 1893, Carrier Dove was active in the foreign lumber trade out of British Columbia. The Alaska Packers Association also described Carrier Dove as a "salmon vessel" which had sustained a partial loss at sea amounting to $11,500, in 1893. In 1894, she loaded lumber at Nanaimo under Captain Brandt. She was used for fishing between 1902 and 1907. On November 19, 1903, while at sea in the vicinity of Juneau, Alaska, a seaman jumped overboard. "A boat was launched and man picked up, but died soon afterwards."

The Seattle-Alaska Fish Co. began business in Seattle in 1902, using for its home station the old West Seattle plant of the Oceanic Packing Co. The first year the schooner Carrier Dove was the only vessel outfitted, but in 1903 the schooner Nellie Colman was added. In 1906 the latter vessel was sold, her place being taken by the schooner Maid of Orleans. Only the Carrier Dove was outfitted in 1907, but in 1908 she was sold and the Maid of Orleans outfitted. In 1910 the company was absorbed by the King & Winge Codfish Co., of Seattle.

Carrier Dove took a load of lumber from Masset Inlet, British Columbia to Port Adelaide in 1919–1920.

On 27 February 1920, Carrier Dove ran aground on a reef at Levuka, Fiji. She was refloated, repaired, and returned to service.

=== 1921 shipwreck ===
Carrier Dove was wrecked after striking a reef near the Hawaiian island of Molokai on 21 November 1921. She had become "waterlogged and unmanageable while on a voyage from Tonga Island for San Francisco with copra." The Pacific Marine Review reported that the loss of the "Moore schooner Carrier Dove" was estimated at "$77,000 cargo, no hull."

The American schooner Carrier Dove, wrecked on the Island of Molokai, Hawaii, November 2, was "lost" twice before, once in September, 1903, on the China coast, and again in February, 1920, during a hurricane that cast her on a reef of Fiji. She was salved both times. No salvage of the latest wreck is possible.

"Two tons of copra from the wreck were gathered up four days later on the Kai-lua beach on Oahu." The wreck was still "visible on the ocean bottom" as of 2002.

Canada
- Builder: Wolfe Island, Ontario
- Launched: 1854
- Fate: Sunk on the American side of Lake Ontario, March 3, 1876

General characteristics
- Class & type: Schooner

== 1854 Great Lakes schooner Carrier Dove ==
An earlier schooner named Carrier Dove was built in 1854 at Wolfe Island, Ontario. She sunk on the American side of Lake Ontario March 3, 1876, when the boat was "swept from her moorings and dragged underneath another schooner."
