= Lyman D. Foster =

Cargo vessel

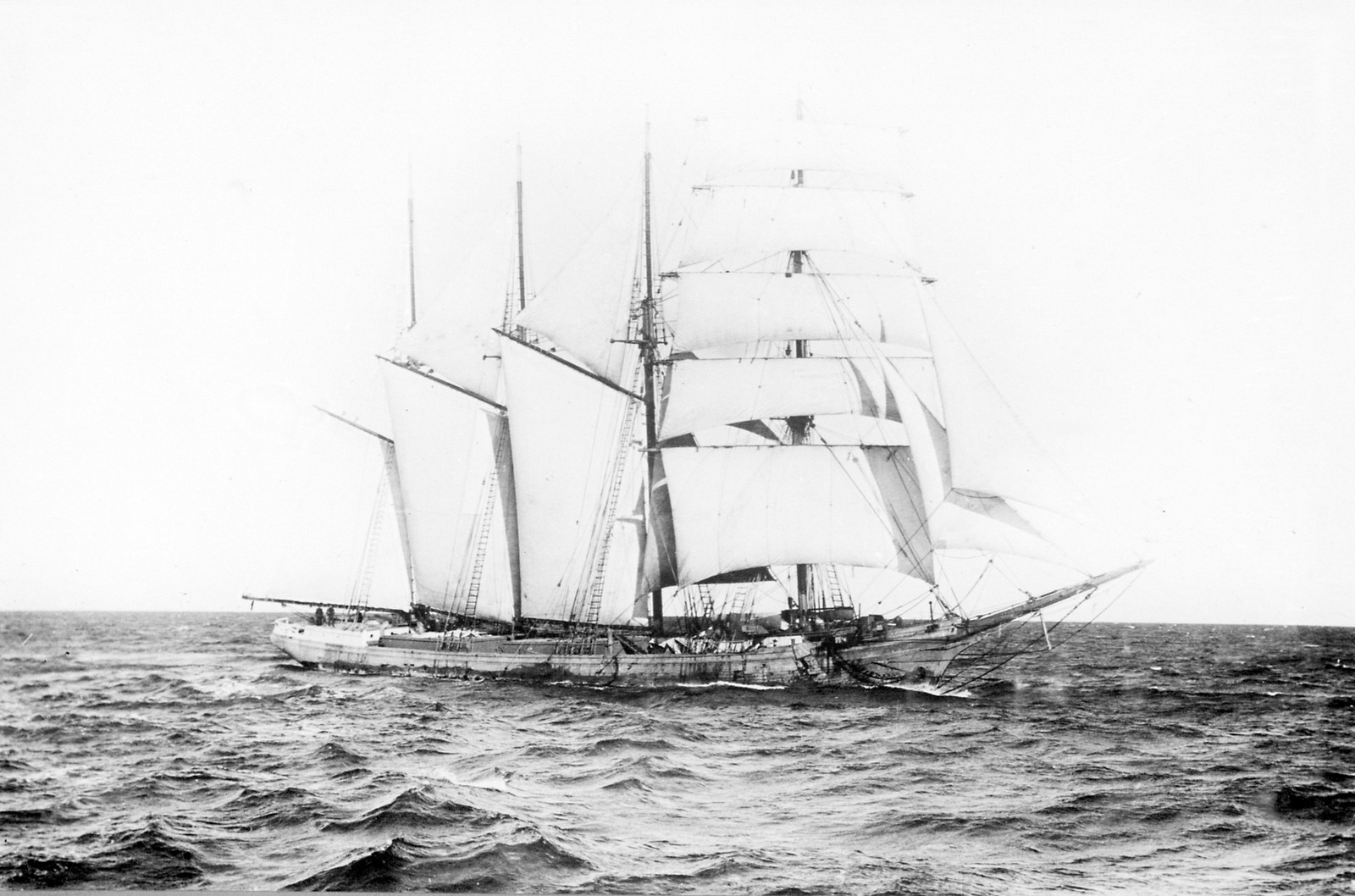
Lyman D. Foster as a barquentine, Brodie Collection, State Library of Victoria, Photographer George Schutze (1885–1946). This photograph represents the vessel as it was during the years 1917 to 1919 and could only have been taken during that period.

Lyman D. Foster was an ocean-going, cargo-carrying, wooden sailing vessel named after the son of a provisions merchant who invested in vessels. Built at the Hall Brother's shipyard at Port Blakely, Washington (state), U.S.A. in 1892, she was 184 feet long with a 39-feet beam and 15.4 feet depth, and had a tonnage of 778 GRT.

She had three separate incarnations.

Initially a four-masted schooner for the West Coast lumber trade, she was dismasted in April 1913 in a hurricane, and abandoned.

Her recovered hull was sold to the Government of Fiji and fitted out with machinery becoming the suction dredge, Lady Escott.

In 1917, she was made seaworthy and re-rigged as a four-masted barquentine—once again as Lyman D. Foster—for owners based in Auckland, New Zealand. The Lyman D. Foster was last seen leaving Nukuʻalofa, Tonga on 26 March 1919 bound for San Francisco, with cargo of copra. On 29 October 1919, the vessel was posted as 'missing' by Lloyds, and remains so, over a century after her disappearance.

== As a schooner ==
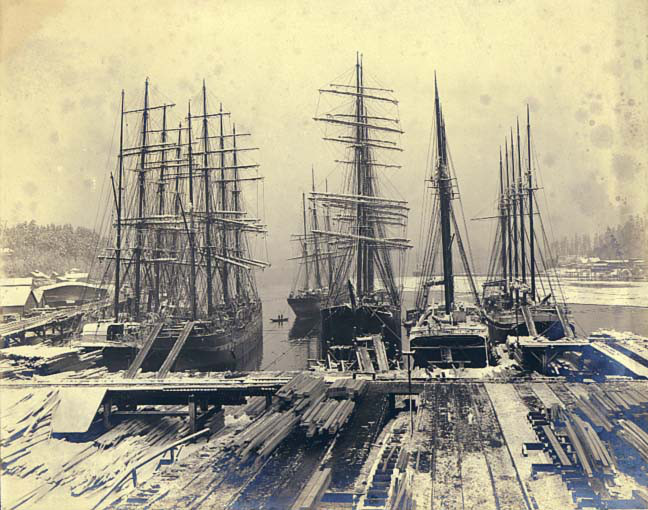
Ships loading lumber at Port Blakely 1905. The schooner Lyman D. Foster is second from right. (Photographer. Wilhelm Hester (b.1872 d.1947), from Wilhelm Hester Photographs Collection, University of Washington)

Lyman D. Foster was built at the Hall Brother's shipyard at Port Blakely, Washington (state), U.S.A. in 1892 as a four-masted schooner. She was named after the son of Samuel Foster, a provision merchant from San Francisco who invested in vessels. She was owned by G. E. Billings of San Francisco, and flew the flag of the United States of America.

She was used primarily to carry lumber from the US West Coast to Australia, and coal and other cargoes on the return journey, but visited other ports in the Pacific, including Suva, Honolulu, and Shanghai, typically carrying lumber on the outbound leg.

=== Voyages ===
==== Murder of Captain Dreyer (1896) ====
Lyman D. Forster left Puget Sound on December 22, 1895, laden with lumber, for Shanghai. On 25 February 1896, Captain Dreyer was suddenly attacked by the cook, without warning. Except for that, there are differences between the two versions of what happened.

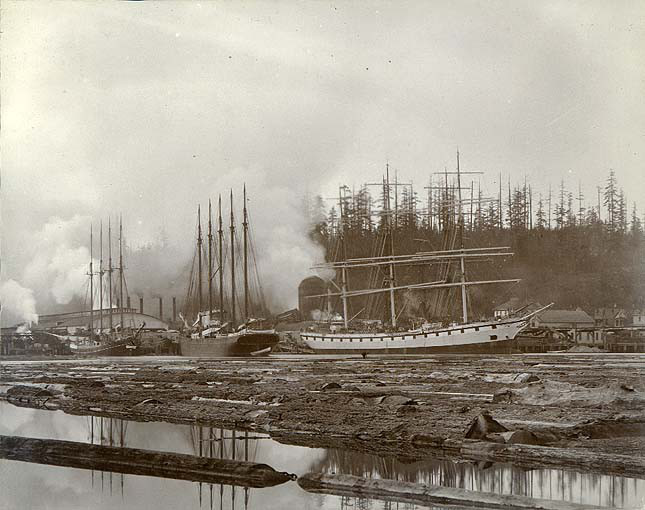
Lumber mill at Port Blakely 1904. The Lyman D. Foster is the four-masted schooner on the left. (Photographer. Wilhelm Hester (b.1872 d.1947), from Wilhelm Hester Photographs Collection, University of Washington)

In one version—widely reported in Australia newspapers and said to have been reported via the steamer Tsinan—when the captain entered the donkey-room at 9:30 a.m., the cook attacked the captain with the galley axe. The steward went to the captain's assistance, and in trying to wrest the axe out of the cook's hands, was also cut in several places about the head. The cook then suddenly drew a revolver, and shot the captain twice in the left breast. The captain ran on deck, and informed the mate, who armed himself with a pair of handcuffs and revolver. The cook dodged about the galley and attacked another sailor with his axe, cutting him in about eight different places. The mate fired two shots into the galley. In the meantime, the cook soaked the gallery in kerosene and set fire to it. The cook was then subdued, handcuffed, and tied to the main mast. Using the pumps, the fire was extinguished. When the crew returned on deck, they found the cook had untied the rope with which he had been secured and, before anyone could catch him, he said "Goodbye," and committed suicide by jumping overboard. Captain Dreyer was mortally wounded, and died on the following day.

This version of events was also reported by the Truth (Sydney), with an implicit anti-Chinese bias consistent with the sensationalist and xenophobic nature of that newspaper and its proprietor, John Norton.

However, there was a subsequent case at the U.S. Consular Court in Shanghai (United States v. Linn and Gertzen, 1896) and—from the report in the San Francisco Call of 21 March 1896—it is apparent that there is another, less sensational, version of events surrounding Captain Dreyer's murder. Under that other version, the cook used a carving knife to stab Captain Dreyer in the back, Dreyer died quickly, and the cook (Linn) and his assistant (Gertzen) survived to face trial for murder.

The Lyman D. Foster returned to Puget Sound from Shanghai under the temporary command of the mate.

==== Captain Killman and his family ====
The next master of Lyman D. Foster was Captain Daniel O. Killman, who retained command, until the ship was abandoned in 1913. Much is known of Killman's life at sea, because he wrote an autobiography, Forty Years Master: a life in sail & steam. His nickname among seafarers was "Crazy Killman", not so much due to his mental state but for his single-minded determination.

Unusually, Killman's wife, Minnie, and his daughter accompanied him on voyages. His eldest daughter, Catherine Sudden Killman was named after Killman's previous command, the barquentine Catherine Sudden. Catherine spent most of the first fourteen years of her life at sea, beginning before she was one year old, aboard Catherine Sudden and later aboard Lyman D. Foster. During that time she visited many countries and ports. As an adult, she recalled that she had made five trips to Australia and, at the age of eight, had seen a bullfight at Mazatlan, Mexico. Captain Killman instructed his daughter while at sea and she had to study hard. She went on to become a school teacher in Tacoma.

==== Explosion (1904) ====
Although Lyman D. Foster relied on her sails for propulsion, like many ocean-going sailing vessels of the time, she was fitted with a steam boiler and donkey engine. This engine reduced the manual labour needed to operate the vessel, by powering winches and pumps.

Leaving Puget Sound on a voyage to Sydney in 1904, the schooner was towed out from Whatcom—her loading port—and was abreast of Cape Flattery, when there was a terrific explosion. The boiler of the donkey engine had burst and completely wrecked the deck house in the vicinity. The donkey engine Itself was also smashed to pieces, one portion crashing into a lifeboat and damaging it beyond repair. The cook of the vessel was the only man hurt by the explosion. He was picked up among the wreckage, and was found to be badly scalded. The schooner immediately put back to Seattle, where the injured man was landed, and the necessary repairs made, before continuing the voyage.

=== Wreck and abandonment ===
Bound from Puget Sound to Suva with a cargo of a million feet of lumber, Lyman D. Foster was caught in a hurricane off Turtle Island (Vatoa), in the Lau Group, on 15 April 1913.

Three eyewitness accounts of the hurricane exist. The first is a nearly contemporaneous account given by a steward from the schooner, as reported in the Daily Telegraph (Sydney) of 16 May 1913. The second account is that of Captain Killman, as reported in the Tacoma Daily Ledger of 3 August 1913—and so written just over four months after the event—which is quoted in the notes accompanying his autobiography. The third is the one written many years after the event, also by Captain Killman, which is included in his autobiography. The three accounts differ only slightly and are aligned concerning the sequence of events.

The hurricane struck Lyman D. Foster between noon on 15 April 1913, when the wind began steadily increasing in force, and the following early morning. According to Captain Killman, the first damage to the ship occurred at around 9:00 p.m. when the a foresail blew away, and around 10:30 p.m. waves began breaking over the deck of the ship.

The schooner was carrying a portion of its cargo of lumber on the deck. Waves breaking over the deck shifted this deck-cargo and soon carried it over the sides of the ship. Approximately a third of the cargo was lost, in this way. Next, the main-mast broke in two and the loose part went over the side, unfortunately tearing away the chainplates in the process. The damage put great strain on the fore-mast, which also broke. The mizzen-mast broke next and—relatively gently—came to rest on the deck, but in doing so damaged the steering gear. By the morning, the rudder was gone. The crew had no sleep that night but did manage to cut away the broken mizzen-mast.

Daylight revealed the extent of the damage; all the masts, the rudder and all the boats had been lost, together with a third of the cargo. The schooner was still afloat, but only just. The ship had taken on a lot of water. She had drawn 17-feet when leaving port fully laden but was now drawing 22-feet and so sitting very low in the water. None of the crew of eleven was seriously injured.

With no land in sight and no life-boats, the crew had no immediate choice but to stay with the floating hulk of the Lyman D. Foster, despite the risk that swelling of the wet lumber cargo would damage the hull. They did however still have some charts—they were able to establish that they were drifting toward Fiji—some canned-meat and canned-fruits, and the remainder of the cargo of lumber. They also had 800 gallons of fresh water on board.

Captain D. O. Killman and the other ten members of the crew built two makeshift scows, using wood from the cargo and nails and other materials that they retrieved from the ship. They caulked the scows using rope and molten beeswax and made some sails.

The crew sighted a steamer but that ship did not see them, possibly because, without masts and low in the water, Lyman D. Foster would not be visible at a distance.

On 1 May 1913, an island was sighted about 20-miles distant and it was decided that this was their best opportunity. The ship was abandoned at 8 a.m. and it took the rest of the day to reach the island of Kabara—pronounced [kamˈbara]. Both scows were in great peril crossing the coral reef to reach the calmer water of the island's lagoon The scow under Captain Killman reach land first. The second one, under the mate, arrived only after darkness fell and then only thanks to some Fijians from Kabara, who assisted it across the reef in darkness.

All the crew of Lyman D. Foster had survived their ordeal by safely reaching Kabara. From there they proceeded to Levuka by cutter, arriving on 5 May 1913. After reaching Australia aboard a steamer, Captain Killman accepted command of the schooner H.K.Hall in Sydney.

=== Salvage and sale ===
Once Lyman D. Foster had been abandoned by its captain and crew, it became possible for other ships to attempt to recover the ship.

Lyman D. Foster, towed by the Union Co. steamer Waipori, arrived at Suva on 13 May 1913. She had been anchored at the island of Totoya after having been recovered on 4 May 1913 and towed to that island by the inter-insular steamer Ripple. The tow had been difficult as Lyman D. Foster handled badly, due to her missing rudder, and was carrying water as well as the remaining part of her cargo of lumber.

The owners of the Ripple claimed salvage. This was disputed by the master of Lyman D. Foster on the grounds that the recovery had taken place inside territorial waters, and so the Ripple's owners were only entitled to a reasonable towage fee. In the meantime, the Receiver of Wrecks under a colonial ordinance, sold the salvaged cargo but retained the proceeds until the interested parties arrived at an understanding or obtained a decision from the Court.

The hull of Lyman D. Foster was bought by the Government of Fiji, for a bargain price of £240 at auction, with the remaining cargo sold for £4,244. Government engineers had identified a means of docking her locally by a temporary modification to the slip. Her owners had thought that she was too big to place on the slip at Suva, and it would have been very costly to send her to Sydney to be docked.

== As the dredge Lady Escott ==
A dredge was needed for harbour improvement works and land reclamation at Suva. When Mr. C. W. Harris, engineer in charge of the Suva harbour works, saw what remained of Lyman D. Foster in Suva, he decided that she was suitable for the purpose, and bought the vessel for the Fiji Government.

The hull was docked on the slip in Suva, found to be in good condition, repaired, and fitted out with machinery, to become the suction dredge known as the Lady Escott. The dredge was named for the wife of the then Governor of Fiji, Sir Ernest Bickham Sweet-Escott.

By 1916, the shipping losses during World War 1 had resulted in a huge increase in the value of ship's hulls and, when the government no longer needed the dredge, it was put up for sale by tender. By June 1917, the dredge had been sold to the Kaipara Steamship Company of Auckland, New Zealand.

In the 1920s, there was a Fiji Government yacht also named after Lady Escott. The second 'Lady Escott' foundered on 11 January 1930, after breaking its moorings in a storm.

== As a barquentine ==
The Union Company steamer Karori towed the hulk 1200 miles from Suva to Auckland, arriving in August 1917. While under tow, the hulk was in the charge of Captain John Francis Place, an early European settler of Fiji.

The hulk was in the Calliope Dock by late September 1917. The dredging machinery was removed and—once again named the Lyman D. Foster—the vessel was made seaworthy again. She was fitted with the four masts from the American schooner E. B. Jackson, which went ashore at the entrance to Apia Harbour and became a total wreck. It was planned to replace the fore-mast with an iron mast—in good condition—taken from the old ship America. Lyman D. Foster was re-rigged as a four-masted barquentine.

The newly rigged barquentine left Auckland and returned from San Francisco with a cargo of 'case-oil', arriving in Auckland on 5 July 1918. On this first voyage as a barquentine, her master was Captain Andrew J. Lockie, a New Zealander, who later commanded the ill-fated SS Canastota.

Lyman D. Foster left Auckland again on 5 August 1918, to pick up a cargo of copra from Tonga, which she reached on 24 August 1918, bound for San Francisco. She left San Francisco on 12 December 1918 and completed her second voyage on 29 January 1919, when she returned to Auckland. On the second voyage, the master was Captain Frederick Ferdinand Nilsson, a Swedish-born experienced master, who was some years earlier the master of the barque Manurewa (later lost with all hands in April 1922). Nilsson resided with his wife and family at Stanley Point in Auckland, New Zealand.

== Disappearance and aftermath ==
Lyman D. Foster left Auckland on 1 March 1919, on her third voyage as a barquentine, under the command of Captain Nilsson. She called at Nukuʻalofa, Tonga, to pick up a cargo of copra, a material known for its propensity to spontaneously combust. On 26 March 1919, the ship left Nukuʻalofa, bound for San Francisco, and was never heard from again. At the time of her disappearance, her crew was 12 men.

As sailing ships relied upon the prevailing weather and could not reliably maintain a set speed, initially, it was thought that Lyman D. Foster had been becalmed. When ships began to arrive in San Francisco that had left Tonga well after Lyman D. Foster, it became apparent Lyman D. Foster had been lost with all hands. Lyman D. Foster was posted as 'missing' by Lloyds, on 29 October 1919, and remains so a century after her disappearance. No trace of her was ever found.

The wages of the crew—£175 3s.—were still owing and it was necessary to determine a date for the loss of the ship in order that those wages could be paid to the dependents of the crew members. The Auckland Magistrate's Court sat on 23 November 1920 to determine the matter. Evidence was given by Captain Charles Fleming, Superintendent of Marine, that there had been very bad weather subsequent to the ship leaving Nukuʻalofa. The date of the loss was fixed as 31 March 1919. Compensation of £500 each was given to two widows of lost crewmen, Mesdames Jalfon and Haskings.
