= Francis H. Leggett =

American Schooner

History
- Name: Francis H. Leggett
- Namesake: A business partner of A. B. Hammond
- Owner: Hicks-Hauptman Transportation Co.
- Operator: McCormick Steamship Company, San Francisco, California
- Port of registry: United States
- Builder: Newport News Shipbuilding; Newport News, Virginia
- Launched: January 31, 1903
- Completed: 1903
- In service: 1903
- Identification: Radio callsign WNF and code letters KSHC
- Fate: Sank September 18, 1914

General characteristics
- Type: steam-powered schooner
- Tonnage: 1,606 GRT; 975 NT
- Length: 241.5 feet (73.6 m)
- Beam: 41.2 feet (12.6 m)
- Depth: 14.8 feet (4.5 m)
- Installed power: 1,000 hp
- Crew: 29

Francis H. Leggett was an American-flagged steam-powered schooner built in 1903 by Newport News Shipbuilding in Newport News, Virginia, as a timber-hauling ship serving Andrew Benoni Hammond's timber operations on the United States West Coast. She served in this capacity for 11 years before she sank 60 miles south of the Columbia River on the coast of Oregon. The disaster killed 35 of the 37 passengers aboard and all 25 crewmen. It was the worst maritime accident in the history of Oregon. The ship had a long history of rudder failures, but the sinking was attributed to the gale and a shifting deck load of railroad ties.

== Construction ==
In 1903, with his timber operations in full bloom in the Pacific Northwest, timber baron A. B. Hammond began acquiring what became known as "Hammond's Navy," a flotilla of 72 ships (not all owned simultaneously) that served his operations. The flagship of this flotilla was Francis H. Leggett, which Hammond named after one of his business partners and commissioned to be the largest ship in the Pacific lumber trade. With a capacity of 1.5 million board-feet of lumber, her steel hull was so large that she could not enter many of the ports on U.S. West Coast. Nicknamed "Hammond's Folly," she nevertheless was a commercial success when she arrived on the U.S. West Coast from the Virginia shipyard where she was built. In 1905 alone, Francis H. Leggett and her sister ship Arctic netted Hammond $62,000 in profit, more than the profit of some of his timber operations. The success of Francis H. Leggett led Hammond to acquire more ships.

Later, Francis H. Leggett was one of the pioneering ships behind the technique of ocean rafting (also called Benson rafting), whereby large rafts of logs were chained together and towed. These rafts could be up to 700 feet (210 m) long and contain up to 11 million board feet of timber. After some years of success, the practice was banned by the United States Congress in 1912 after several rafts broke up in storms, spreading large logs up and down the coast and creating a hazard to shipping.

== Sinking ==
On September 17, 1914, Francis H. Leggett departed Grays Harbor, Washington, for San Francisco, California, with a load of railroad ties lashed to her deck. While the weather was calm in Grays Harbor, it worsened as the ship steamed south, where a 60 miles per hour (97 km/h) gale was blowing off the coast of Oregon. On September 18, the ship's cargo of railroad ties began to shift, and a hatch cover was torn off by the storm, allowing waves to flood into the ship. Charles Maro, the captain of Francis H. Leggett, ordered the ship's radio operators to send a distress call as the ship began to sink.

The distress signal was detected by the Imperial Japanese Navy armored cruiser Izumo, but Izumo did not respond to Francis H. Leggett out of fear that she would encounter the Imperial German Navy light cruiser SMS Leipzig, which was nearby; World War I had begun, Japan was at war with Germany, and Izumo feared being attacked by the more modern German ship. Izumo relayed the distress signal to the Marconi office who notified other ships, including the oil tanker Frank H. Buck and the steamer Beaver. Both ships responded to the call for help, but by the time they arrived on the scene, Francis H. Leggett had sunk, leaving only its cargo of railroad ties still afloat. Two passengers aboard Francis H. Leggett were rescued. One of the survivors, Alexander Farrell, explained that the storm swamped both of the ship's lifeboats as soon as they were lowered. Both survivors lived by clinging to railroad ties. The death toll of 60 people makes it Oregon's worst maritime disaster on record.
