= Pacific Creosoting Company =

American wood products treatment company

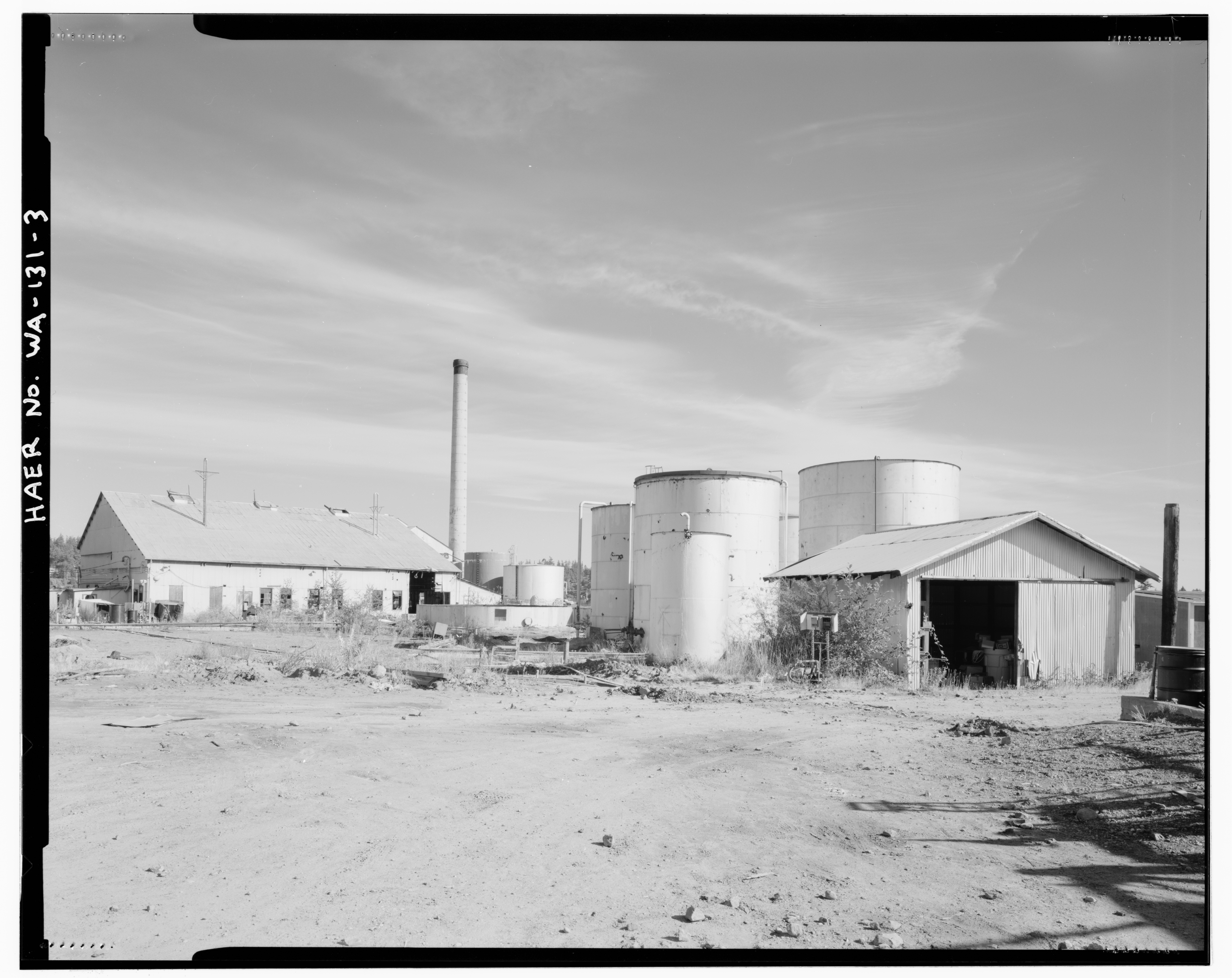
Plant site in 1995

Pacific Creosoting Company was a company founded on Bainbridge Island in Kitsap County, Washington, United States, that treated logs with creosote as a preservative.

== History ==
It began operations as The Perfection Pile Preserving Company in 1904. It moved in 1905 to Eagle Harbor at Winslow in the city of Bainbridge Island.

The company was taken over and renamed by Horace Chapin Henry in 1906, around when he introduced the new Bethell Process. The company's Vice President and General Manager, Hugh R. Rood, was a victim of the 1912 RMS Titanic sinking.

After Henry died in 1928, his company and its competitor, J. M. Colman's Creosote Company (located in West Seattle), were combined in 1930 to form the West Coast Wood Preserving Company. In 1947, Walter Wyckoff bought out the Colman family's interest and, after joining with J. H. Baxter & Co. in 1959, renamed the company the Baxter-Wyckoff Company. In 1964, Wyckoff bought out Baxter and renamed the company the Wyckoff Company.

The Eagle Harbor site was one of the largest producers of treated wood products in the US. Treated wood from the site was used to build wharves in San Francisco, flood control channels in Los Angeles, and the Panama Canal.

The facility's remaining buildings, located along the south side of Eagle Harbor on Bainbridge Island, were documented in a 1996 Historic American Engineering Record (HAER) project. The historic documentation was done before their removal by the EPA for pollution remediation.

The severity of pollution from the Wyckoff Company wood treatment plant was first documented in the 1970s by state and federal agencies, but it was only when property values started to drop in 1983 that the Bainbridge community at large became involved. The property value dropped on the land where Wyckoff was operating, due to internal reports that the land was polluted. In 1984, the Kitsap Health District banned fishing in Eagle Harbor, where it continues to be prohibited in the year 2022, due to environmental pollution and health concerns. The fact that this environmental pollution has damaged an ecosystem to the extent that shellfish cannot be collected in that area is in direct violation of the Treaty of Point Elliott. The Treaty of Point Elliott was the initial agreement signed in 1855 where Native Peoples, represented by the, “Dwamish, Suquamish, Sk-kahl-mish, Sam-ahmish, Smalh-kamish, Skope-ahmish, St-kah-mish, Snoqualmoo, Skai-wha-mish, N'Quentl-ma-mish, Sk-tah-le-jum, Stoluck-wha-mish, Sno-ho-mish, Skagit, Kik-i-allus, Swin-a-mish, Squin-ah-mish, Sah-ku-mehu, Noo-wha-ha, Nook-wa-chah-mish, Mee-see-qua-guilch, Cho-bah-ah-bish, and other allied and subordinate tribes and bands of Indians occupying certain lands situated in said Territory of Washington” ceded their land to the U.S. government, with the stipulation that reservation land would be allocated and provided, and that they would have continued access to their traditional hunting and fishing grounds. The Suquamish tribe originally inhabited Bainbridge Island before the Treaty of Point Elliott, and relocated to the Port Madison Indian Reservation in the subsequent years. During this time, little information is available about the transition process for the Suquamish Peoples, although it has been noted that they continued to harvest their traditional foods from the beaches while the area was being largely stripped of its timber resources. Eagle Harbor is a traditional fishing area for the Suquamish tribe, and is represented as such on their tribal fishing & hunting regulation map. NOAA has released consumption advisories against bottom dwelling organisms, such as clams and geoducks, both cultural foods to the Suquamish tribe, in the area since 1985, citing Eagle Harbor as the most polluted area in the Puget Sound of a specific carcinogenic hydrocarbon found within creosote. Even though the Wyckoff Co. did not operate on recognized tribal land at the time of its operation, it did operate on ancestral Suquamish land, and the pollution that Wyckoff Co. generated spread into recognized tribal fishing areas, prohibiting access to traditional foodways.

== Superfund site ==
The Environmental Protection Agency started investigating environmental issues at the Wyckoff site in Eagle Harbor in 1971. Studies showed a high concentration of PAH pollution in the harbor and related it to liver lesions in fish. The Wyckoff site was put on the Superfund list in 1987 for PAH, heavy metals and PCB pollution. The Pacific Sound Resources site in West Seattle was put on the Superfund list in 1994. The company had renamed itself as Pacific Sound Resources and, due to expenses associated with clean-up, the company went bankrupt in 1993.

Between 1994 and 2002, the US Army Corps of Engineers created a 1-to-3-foot-thick (30 to 91 cm) cap of clean sediments over the bottom of the Eagle Harbor to contain polluted sediments. The West Seattle site was capped and use of the site restricted.

The Association of Bainbridge Communities (ABC) worked closely with the Environmental Protection Agency (EPA) in 1985 to receive a spot on the National Priority List, which would then make the Wyckoff pollution available for federal cleanup funds under the Superfund allocation. Signatures totalling 2,000 people were delivered to the U.S. congress representative, eventually awarding National Priority List funding in 1987. At this time, the Wyckoff Co. began their pollution treatment plan, using a pump and treat system with the construction of a new wastewater treatment facility. However, in 1988, the EPA took over the cleanup operation after the Wyckoff Co. transitioned to Pacific Sound Resources and declared bankruptcy. From 1992 to 1994, the EPA removed 29,000 tons of creosote sludge and 100,000 gallons of contaminated oils. Also during this period, capping of the bay was initiated, which is the process of dumping clean sands and gravels on top of contaminated areas to bury contamination. The goal of capping is to isolate contamination, in this case creosote leakage from the initial site causing an increase in PAH, the carcinogenic hydrocarbon found in creosote. From the beginning of the capping process in 1993 to 1997, creosote was still being identified throughout the bay, spurring the construction of a containment wall around the initial Wyckoff site in 1997.

However, the response intensified after continued creosote sludge spills were still being recorded in the bay. In a monitoring exercise in 1997, EPA divers recorded pools of creosote lying 20-40 ft across the bed of the harbor bottom. Later that year, a final proposed plan was issued by the EPA to cap and contain the rest of the contaminants on site and those that had leached into Eagle Harbor and neighboring beaches, however after facing much opposition from the community and state, a new plan was devised and released in 2000 to continue the pump and treat operation with new steam injection technology. Steam treatment of contaminants began in 2002 in an effort to not leave any contaminants in the environment, but ended a short six months later due to technical problems within the pipes. Within the pressurized compartments, crystals formed to block passage of liquid, along with inconsistent flux of water flow and temperature due to seasonality. For these reasons, the steam enhanced treatment pump and treat operation project ended in 2003. EPA records are inconsistent with the review of this information, as the fourth five year report published in 2017 does not acknowledge the use nor failure of the steam injection pump and treat operation, meanwhile the redacted 2019 record of decision amendment acknowledges the use and failure of steam injection.

At the official closure of the steam-enhanced pump and treat operation in 2004, an estimated 1 million gallons of contamination still needed treatment. The EPA has continued to treat contaminated groundwater and soils since then, using an updated version of the original 1994 construction. They also constructed a steel sheet pile wall to contain creosote seeps into the bay, however it is unclear how much groundwater and soils have been processed since the failure of the steam enhanced pump and treat operation failed. In 2008, the EPA readdressed a creosote seep through one of their formally declared "managed" areas by creating an exposure barrier system, which is a three-foot deep cap over the entire exposed area. This continual repair of caps placed in the region, along with adding rocks to address erosion, has been the main course of action until a new plan was proposed in 2016. This plan obtained approval in 2019, calling for two defined phases. Phase one outlines the construction of a new site access road, replacing the perimeter wall around the original Wyckoff processing site to contain creosote in upper layers of the aquifer, and a continued dredge and cap of neighboring beaches. The second phase of the plan is unclear; the official Wyckoff Superfund website through the EPA does not specify what the second phase entails, nor do any of the linked pdf documents. However, a broad overview of the plan is listed, including: removing all of the machinery from the failed steam enhanced pump and treat operation, creating a diversion subterranean wall for clean ground water to be diverted so as not to mix with creosote infiltrated ground water, immobilizing 267,000 cubic yards of contaminants in the current creosote polluted upper aquifer with a cement slurry (lower aquifer contamination is not addressed in this current action plan), creating outfall drains and caps for all impacted areas, and creating new “institutional controls” for how to best not disturb the cap moving forward. All of these steps are scheduled to be completed by 2032.

Alongside the EPA, the National Oceanic and Atmospheric Administration (NOAA) has been working on restoration projects beginning in 2009. This has included restoring shorelines and vegetation, along with removing bulkheads left from the Wyckoff Co. wood treatment operation. In 2012, NOAA partnered with the Suquamish Tribe for a restoration project planting eelgrass on refilled dredged channel areas around Eagle Harbor that were created in the construction of the Wyckoff Co. wood treatment operation. Eelgrass habitat is native to the Puget Sound, and provides important meadows for salmon, other fish, and marine invertebrates. NOAA is quoted as saying that, “Increasing the amount of eelgrass is one of the highest priorities for restoring the health of Puget Sound.” Restoration of eelgrass habitats is vital to supporting salmon recovery projects, which is especially important to the Chinook Salmon in the region. The Suquamish Tribe was awarded the Restoration Excellence Award in 2016 for their work to replant eelgrass in a portion of the estimated 500 acres of creosote damaged waters.

== See also ==
- Superfund sites in Washington (state)
