= Vatoa =

Island in Fiji

Coordinates: 19°49′S 178°15′W

Native name: Turtle Island
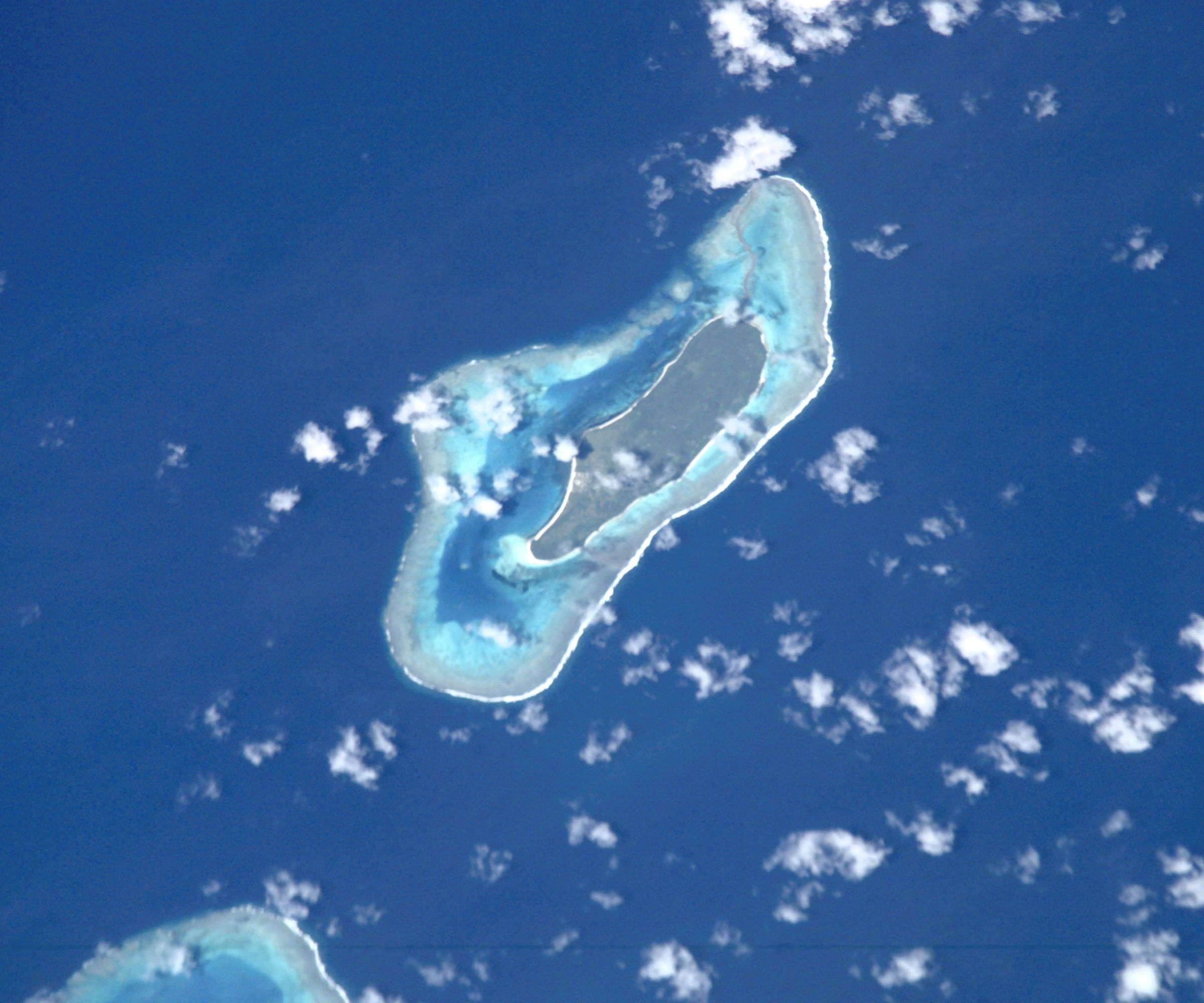
- Aerial view of Vatoa.

- Location within Fiji

Geography
- Location: South Pacific Ocean
- Archipelago: Lau Islands
- Adjacent to: Koro Sea
- Area: 4.45 km^{2} (1.72 sq mi)
- Highest elevation: 50 m (160 ft)

Administration
- Fiji
- Division: Eastern
- Province: Lau
- District: Ono

Vatoa (pronounced [βaˈtoa]) (known as Turtle Island after Cook's visit) is an outlier of Fiji's Lau Group.

== History ==
Vatoa was the only island of present-day Fiji visited by James Cook. The island was sighted on 2 July 1774. The next day, a Sunday, the Master and some of Cook's crew went ashore:

"...thinking to speak with the people not more than 20 in number who were Arm'd with Clubs and Spears, but the moment he set foot on Shore they retired, he left ashore some Medals, Nails and a Knife ..... Near the Reef were seen several Turtle which occasioned my giving that name to the Isle."

—

Cook's chart shows the name Turtle Isle.

== Geography ==
Vatoa has varied rainfall and is usually cool because of trade winds.

The island has an area of 4.45 square kilometres (445.00 hectares; 1,099.62 acres) and rises to more than 50 metres (160 feet) above sea level. It is composed wholly of limestone (Koroqara Limestone, Tokalau Limestone Group), probably Late Miocene in age. A single village has a population around 300. Interesting old fortifications occupy the highest part of the island.

== Government ==
Viliame Naupoto, a noted son of Vatoa, is currently Commander of the Republic of Fiji Military Forces. He once served as Director of Immigration and Deputy Commander of the Republic of Fiji Navy.

== Shipwrecks of Vatoa and associated reef Vuata Vatoa ==
Vatoa and its associated reef, Vuata Vatoa, have a surprising number of shipwrecks, given the closest island to the north is 85 kilometres (46 nmi) and to the south is 105 kilometres (57 nmi), but Vatoa with an elevation of only 50 metres (160 ft) can easily be missed. Some of the wrecks are listed below:

- 1825: Oeno, whaler, Vuata Vatoa
- 1840: Shylock, whaler, Vuata Vatoa
- 1942: SS Thomas A. Edison, cargo ship, Vuata Vatoa
- 1943: USS Grebe, minesweeper, Vuata Vatoa
- 1962: Ragna Ringdal, cargo ship, Vatoa

The schooner Lyman D. Foster, bound for Suva carrying timber, was dismasted in a cyclone off Vatoa in April 1913.
