= Wilhelm Hester =

American photographer (1872–1947)

- Born: 1872; Hamburg, Germany
- Died: 1947 (aged 74–75); Seattle, Washington, U.S.
- Style: Street photography Nature photography

Wilhelm Hester (1872–1947) was a German-born American photographer and businessman who worked in the Pacific Northwest and Alaska from 1893 to 1906.

== Early life ==
Hester was born in Hamburg, Germany in 1872 and moved to the Pacific Northwest in 1893.

== Career ==
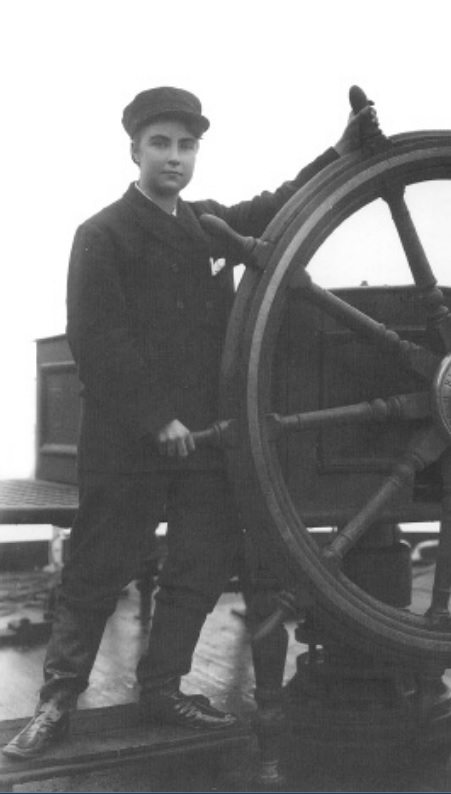
Miss Rother, the daughter of the skipper of the 'Dimsdale', got herself photographed by Wilhelm Hester on the West Coast of USA, holding the rudder dressed up as a sailor

His photographs mainly recorded ships, crews and maritime activity on Puget Sound and the ports of Seattle, Tacoma and Port Blakely. Hester was able to establish a commercial business selling these photographs, often to the crews of the ships that he photographed. He also took a series of photographs in Chinatown, San Francisco, in the 1890s.

In 1898, Hester relocated to Alaska during the Klondike Gold Rush. He had successful mining claims at Anvil Creek and Snow Creek in Alaska, during the Nome gold rush which, in addition to other business ventures, earned him a significant profit. While in Alaska, he photographed early scenes of Nome and the surrounding areas.

He returned to the Puget Sound area in 1899 to resume his photographic business there, but appears to have visited Alaska again in 1900.

In 1906, he gave up his photography business and became involved in real estate.

== Death ==
He died in Seattle in 1947.

== Legacy ==
His legacy is the lasting historical record of his photographs. The Wilhelm Hester Photographs Collection of the Suzzallo Library consists of 1213 of his photographic prints and 85 glass plate negatives. The San Francisco Maritime National Historical Park has 837 items in its collection, mostly 8 x 10 inch glass gelatin dry plates. The J. Paul Getty Museum in Los Angeles and the Fine Arts Museums of San Francisco also have some of his photographs in their collections.
