= McCormick & Baxter Creosoting Company =

American wood products treatment company

- Industry: Wood treatment
- Founded: 1942 in Stockton, California, U.S.
- Founders: Charles R. McCormick Jr.; Howard W. Baxter
- Defunct: 1991

The McCormick & Baxter Creosoting Company was an American wood treatment company. It operated plants in Stockton, California, and Portland, Oregon, that treated a variety of wood products using creosote and other chemical preservatives. Both locations have been designated as Superfund sites by the Environmental Protection Agency (EPA).

== History ==
The McCormick & Baxter Creosoting Company established a plant in Stockton, California, in 1942. The facility treated products such as utility poles and railroad ties. The company began construction of another plant in Portland, Oregon, in 1945. Charles R. McCormick Jr. of Portland and Howard W. Baxter of San Francisco were the founders of the firm.

The company declared Chapter 11 bankruptcy in 1988 and ended its operations in 1991.

== Superfund sites ==
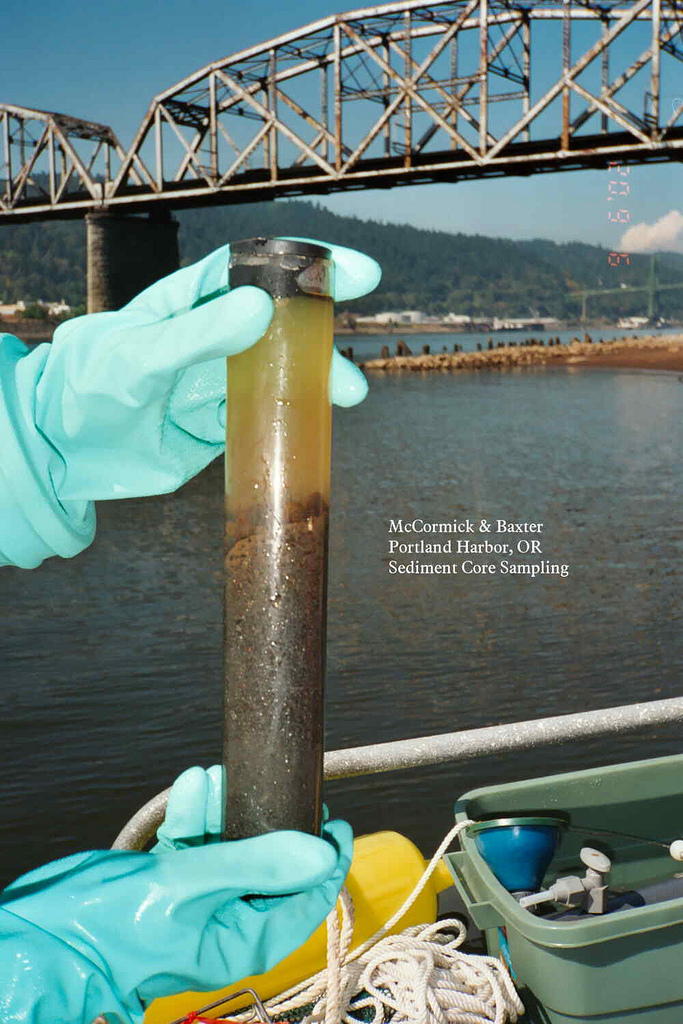
An EPA diver holds a sediment sample from the Portland site in 2012

=== Stockton, California ===
The Stockton site (37.948°N 121.311°W) consists of 29 acres (12 ha) of land in an industrial area near the Port of Stockton. The EPA demolished the facilities in 1994 and performed a variety of cleanup measures in the following years.

=== Portland, Oregon ===
The Portland site (45.579°N 122.741°W) consists of 41 acres (17 ha) of land along the east bank of the Willamette River, just upstream of BNSF Railway Bridge 5.1. Cleanup of the site was completed by the EPA and the Oregon Department of Environmental Quality (DEQ) in 2005. In 2024, the non-profit organization Portland Botanical Gardens entered a purchase and sale agreement to acquire the site from McCormick & Baxter, subject to approval from the DEQ and EPA.

== See also ==
- Charles R. McCormick Lumber Company
- J. H. Baxter and Co.
- List of Superfund sites in California
- List of Superfund sites in Oregon
