= Inca (schooner) =

Five-masted schooner Washington state, U.S.

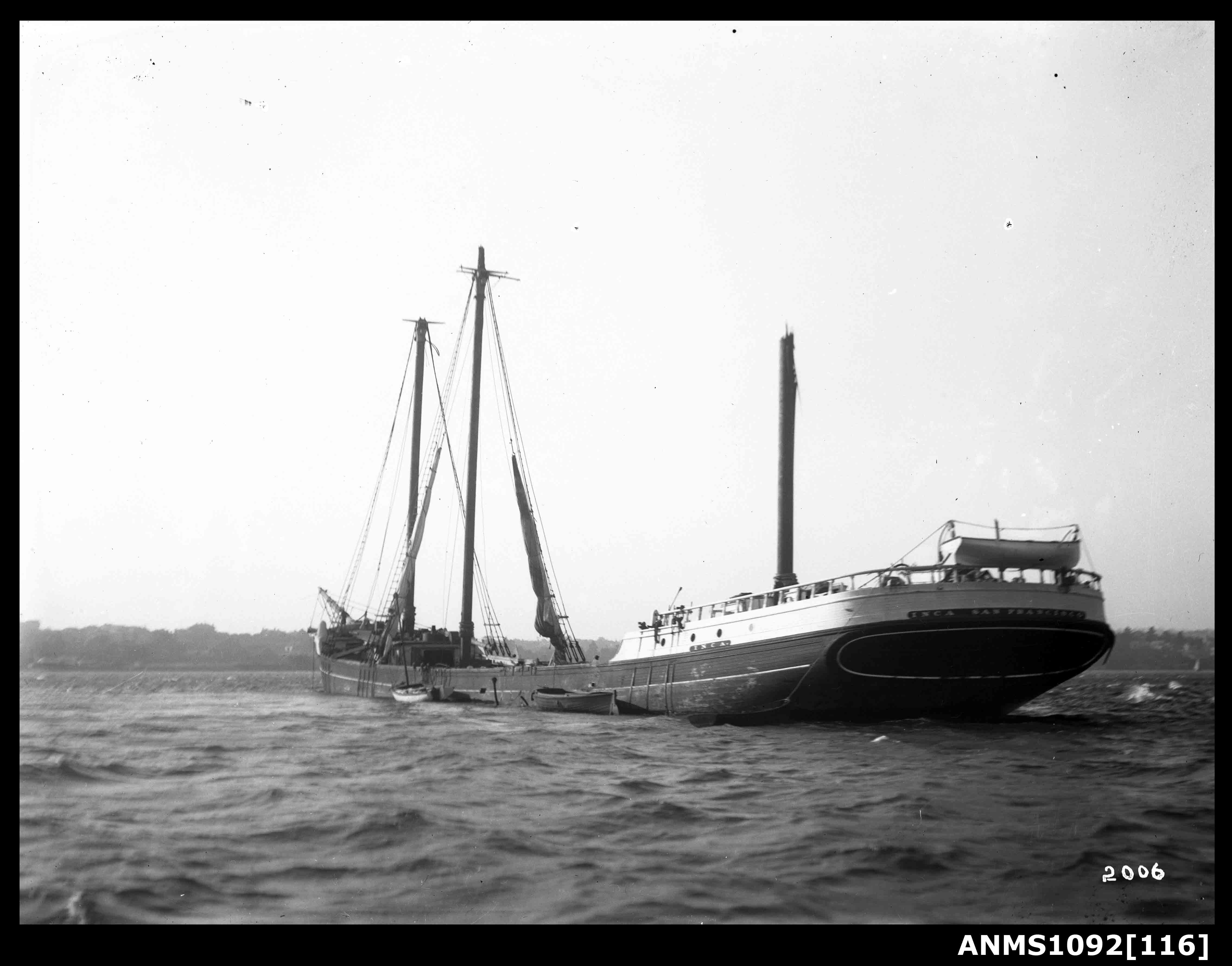
- The damaged schooner Inca at anchor, possibly in Sydney Harbour, c 1920.

History

United States
- Builder: Hall Brothers, Port Blakely
- Launched: 1896
- Stricken: 1920
- Fate: Hulked

General characteristics
- Tonnage: 901.88 tons
- Length: 215 ft 5 in (65.66 m)
- Beam: 41 ft 3 in (12.57 m)
- Draft: 16 ft 5 in (5.00 m)
- Sail plan: 5-masted schooner

Inca was "the first true five-masted schooner built on the West Coast." Inca was launched at Port Blakely, Washington, by Hall Bros. in 1896.

== Launching ==
"The Inca, because of its size and rig, had attracted considerable attention during the progress of its construction and when the time set for launching arrived a large crowd of people was present in the shipyards. The Port Blakeley schools were closed so that the pupils might attend the exercises incident to launching. Little Miss Melusina Thornton, the nine-year-old daughter of Chief Engineer Thornton of the steamer Sarah Renton, christened the new boat as it slipped into the water a few minutes before 11 o'clock on the morning of November 11, 1896."

== First cargo of sugar to Port Costa refinery ==
On April 3, 1898, the Inca brought the first cargo, 31,763 bags of sugar, from Honolulu to the new sugar refinery at Port Costa, California. The barkentine Planter followed with a second sugar cargo from Honolulu shortly thereafter.

== Voyage to Alaska gold fields, 1902 ==
On May 13, 1902, Inca was the first vessel to leave Newcastle, Australia for Nome, Alaska, bound for the gold fields.

== Lumber schooner ==
Inca was active in the West Coast lumber trade. In 1907, she arrived in San Francisco with over a million board feet of lumber on board—1,100,000 board feet, according to a local report. Two examples of her lumber voyages follow:

Inca arrived in Astoria, Oregon from Honolulu on July 19, 1910, after discharging ballast at Linnton. She was scheduled to load lumber at the Inman Paulsen mills for New Zealand.

== Dismasting ==
According to Gordon R. Newell, Inca "left Eureka, California October 10, 1920, with a cargo of redwood lumber for Sydney, Australia and was dismasted in the South Pacific. She was abandoned on December 7 by all hands except two men who volunteered to remain on board. The captain, his wife and the other 10 men of the crew set out in the boats and were sighted by the steamship Cosmos, which towed the Inca to Sydney, where she arrived December 18, discharged her cargo and was subsequently hulked."

== Schooner Inca in popular culture ==
Inca Lane in San Francisco is supposedly named after the 5-masted schooner.

== See also ==
- West coast lumber trade
