= Johanna Smith (ship) =

Coordinates: 33.732°N 118.187°W

History

United States
- Name: Johanna Smith
- Builder: W.A. Magee at Kruse & Banks, North Bend, Oregon
- Launched: 1917
- Fate: Sunk after fire, 1932
- Status: "Engined 1919. Hulked 1928"
- Notes: Known as 14 Minute Wreck.

General characteristics
- Class & type: Lumber schooner (steam)
- Tonnage: 1,921 tons
- Length: 257 ft.
- Beam: 50 ft.

Johanna Smith was a wooden-hulled schooner that transported lumber along the United States West Coast. She was built near North Bend, Oregon in 1917. She was sold to the Coos Bay Lumber company in 1918, and transported lumber until 1928.

"Built during First World War, shortages prohibited the installation of an engine in the Johanna Smith ... she was used as a barge until 1921, when she became one of only two Pacific Coast steam schooners to be powered by steam turbines."

In 1928, she was converted into a gambling ship, and was moored off Long Beach, California. It was reported to have 13 gaming tables and 38 slot machines operating twenty-four hours a day.

She burned on 22 July 1932. The cause of the fire was never determined.
