= Charles R. McCormick Lumber Company =

US lumber and shipping company

Charles R. McCormick Lumber Company St. Helens Lumber Company
- House flag
- Industry: Lumber, Shipbuilding, Shipping, Transportation
- Founded: 1908 in San Francisco, United States
- Defunct: 1938
- Fate: Bankruptcy, sold to Pope & Talbot
- Key people: Charles R. McCormick
- Parent: Pope & Talbot, Inc. starting in 1938.
- Subsidiaries: St. Helens shipyard; McCormick Steamship Company; Helens Mill Company; Puget Mill Company mill

McCormick Steamship Company brochure from 1919

Charles R. McCormick Lumber Company was an American lumber company founded in 1908 by Charles R. McCormick in San Francisco, California. The company maintained lumber operations for a time in Oregon, California, and in Washington State, where it also owned a logging railroad. A related concern, the McCormick Steamship Company owned or operated a large number of ocean-going steamships.

== Lumber operations in Oregon ==
McCormick purchased a mill site in St. Helens, Oregon and formed the Helens Mill Company. To feed the mill, McCormick's St. Helens Timber Company also purchased 4,000 acres of timber. In 1912, McCormick formed the St. Helens Lumber Company as the parent company over Helens Mill Company and the St. Helens Timber Company. In 1912, McCormick expanded the company with a second sawmill, a creosoting plant and shipyard, the St. Helens shipyard.

McCormick also expanded into San Diego, California, with a railroad tie factory, to supply Santa Fe Railway and the mines of Utah, Arizona, New Mexico, and northern Mexico. He built a dock at the San Diego site to unload his timbers. With the Great Depression slowdown, McCormick closed the dock at San Diego in April 1931.

== Expansion into Puget Sound region ==
In 1925, McCormick expanded again, buying the Puget Mill Company from Pope & Talbot, Inc. He had trouble raising the money to buy the company for cash, but the motivated sellers decided to finance the sale, taking mortgages on everything McCormick owned as security. The deal included almost nothing as a down payment, but stipulated that the money Mr. McCormick had been able to raise toward the purchase must be spent on upgrading the existing facilities. The sale closed on October 16, 1925. Mr. McCormick had no trouble spending money on the upgrades. In fact, it is said that he just told his people to "buy the best" and left them to their devices. Very quickly the budget was overspent, often on equipment that wasn't necessarily needed—including top-tier logging equipment and a fleet of new locomotives.

== Rail line acquisition ==
Puget Mill had previously purchased on option on the southern branch of the Port Townsend & Southern Railroad, including the line between Port Discovery and Quilcene, Washington. McCormick closed the sale and used the line to feed timber from company lands in the Quilcene River and Snow Creek valleys to the mills at Port Gamble and Port Ludlow. (Logs were hauled to log dumps at Linger Longer Bay near Quilcene, dumped into the Hood Canal, and towed to the sawmills.

This operation was managed out of Camp Talbot, located beside Crocker Lake, south of Port Discovery. He also built new sawmills, in 1926 one at Port Gamble, Washington and one at Port Ludlow. The Port Ludlow logging operations were based at Camp Walker, at the head of Ludlow Bay. McCormick purchased West Fork Logging Company, with timberlands and a logging railroad based at Camp Union, near Seabeck, Washington. McCormick also acquired a logging railroad and timberland near Castle Rock, Washington, which operated out of Camp Cowlitz.

== Business failure ==
Because of his overspending on upgrades and other properties (as well as fluctuations in the lumber market), McCormick struggled to keep the operations afloat, particularly struggling to make his payments to the Pope & Talbot principals. The Pope & Talbot team intervened, taking partial control of the McCormick company. McCormick resorted to harvesting the timber on his land at unsustainable rates, trying to increase the company's cash flow enough to cover the annual payments. He soon ran low on timber, and when he wasn't able to do any more, in 1938, the Pope & Talbot families foreclosed on the mortgages, forcing McCormick into bankruptcy. The Pope & Talbot families bought the rest of McCormick's assets from the bankruptcy sale, reorganized the company as Pope & Talbot, and quickly resumed operations.

Overexpanded and hit by the Depression, McCormick had to give the Puget Mill Company mill, as well as his other companies and properties, back to Pope & Talbot.

== St. Helens shipyard ==
Between 1912 and 1927, the St. Helens shipyard, the St. Helens Shipbuilding Company in St. Helens, Oregon on Sauvie Island just south of Warrior Point, launched 42 wooden ships. The St. Helens shipyard also did repair work at the shipyard. St. Helens Shipbuilding Company built ships for the Emergency Fleet Corporation to support World War I

== Partial list of ships built ==
- SS Wapama, steam schooner in 1915
- Celilo in 1913, wooden steam schooner

	Type	Tons	Year built
Multnomah	Cargo Ship	969	1912
City of Portland	Schooner	1,791	1916
June	Cargo Ship	484	1916
Ruby	Cargo Ship	557	1916
City of St. Helens	Cargo Ship	2,135	1917
Frank D. Stout	Schooner	1,226	1917
John W. Wells	Schooner	2,527	1918
Thistle	Schooner	1,586	1918
Colindo	Cargo Ship, for USSB	2,583	1919
Issaquena	Cargo Ship, for USSB	2,583	1918
Fort Sheridan	Cargo Ship, for USSB		
Fort Shaw	Cargo Ship, for USSB		

== McCormick Steamship Company ==
The McCormick Steamship Company, McCormick Lines, was organized in 1921, and by 1925, this corporation had 71 ships operating between 23 ports on the Pacific Coast. The ships had lumber cargo and Passenger Service. Became a part of the Pope & Talbot line in 1938.

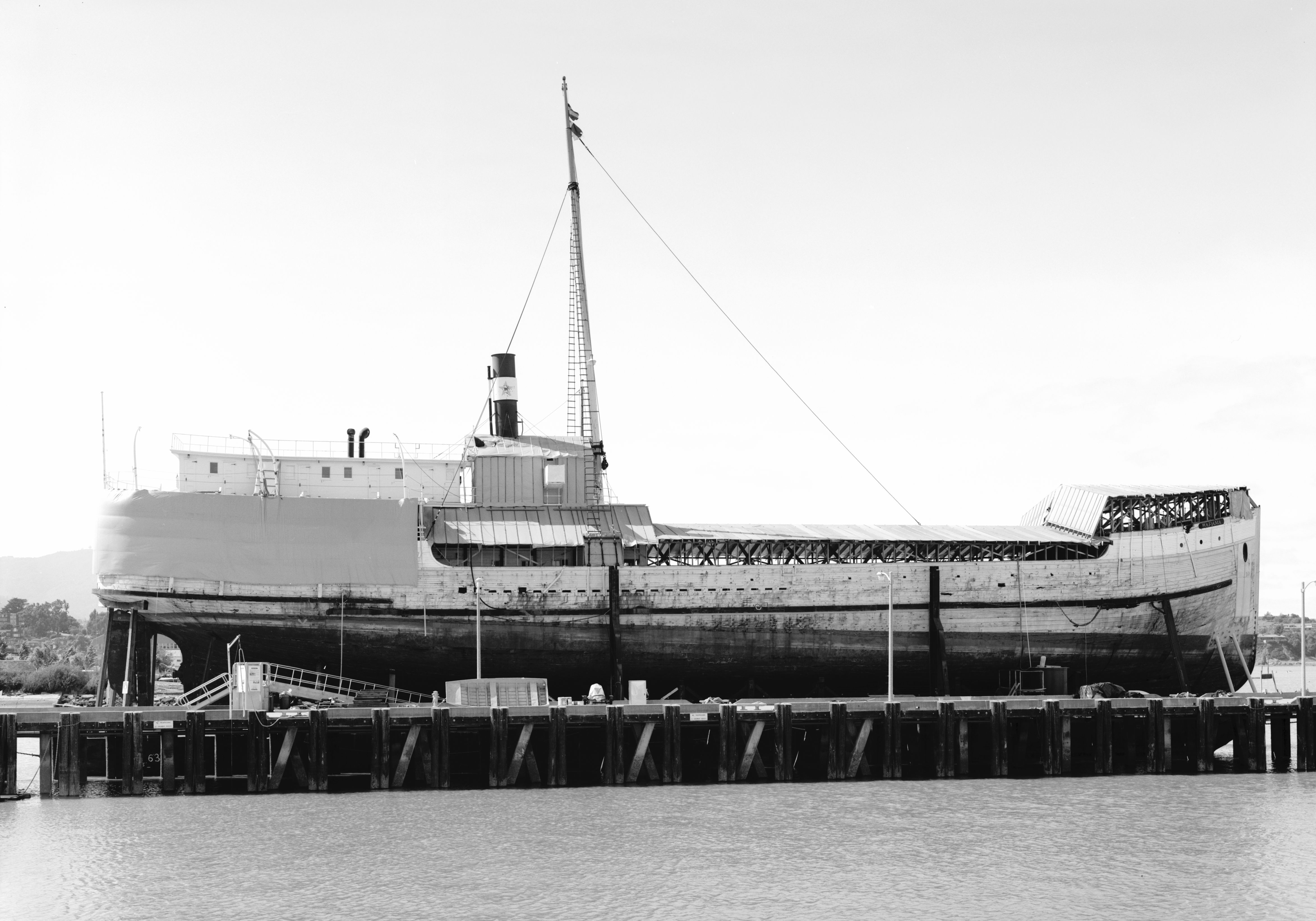
Wapama a steam schooner built in 1915

- Wapama 1915 steam schooner
- Forbes Hauptmann, built in 1919 by Ames, was Western Ally, hit a mine and sank in 1944
- Francis H. Leggett
- SS Charles R. McCormick, Built in 1920 by Standifer, of Vancouver, Washington

1919 Ports: San Diego, Los Angeles (San Pedro), San Francisco, Portland, Hoquiam, Aberdeen, and Seattle

McCormick Steamship Company Ships in 1919:

- Klamath
- Celilo
- Willamette
- Multnomah
- Wapama

Ships 1927, ports: Los Angeles, San Francisco, Portland

- Rose City
- Newport

In 1927, McCormick Steamship Company purchased the Pacific Argentine Brazil Line. Pacific Argentine Brazil Line Routes: Seattle, San Francisco, Los Angeles, Bahia Blanca, Montevideo, Buenos Aires, Buenos Aires, Santos, Bahia, and Puerto Colombia. President Hayes (1920) (was Creole State) and President Harrison (was Wolverine State), Design 1095 ships

1927 Ships:

- Edna
- Newport
- W.R. Chamberlin Jr.
- Wallingford
- Indiana Harbor
- Silverado
- Willamette
- Alvarado
- Wapama
- Sudbury
- Mystic
- Munsomo
- Chas. R. McCormick
- Munaires
- Ipswich

Ships 1940, ports: Seattle, Portland, San Francisco, Los Angeles, Balboa, Cristobal, Norfolk, Baltimore, Philadelphia, New York, San Juan

- Hollywood
- West Cactus
- West Camargo
- West Ira
- West Ivis
- West Mahwah
- West Nilus
- West Notus, sunk by U-404 May 1942

== World War II ==
McCormick Steamship Company's fleet of ships was used to help the World War II effort. During World War II, McCormick Steamship Company operated Merchant navy ships for the United States Shipping Board. During World War II McCormick Steamship Company was active with charter shipping with the Maritime Commission and War Shipping Administration. McCormick Steamship Company operated Liberty ships and Victory ships for the merchant navy. The ship was run by its McCormick Steamship Company crew and the US Navy supplied United States Navy Armed Guards to man the deck guns and radio.

== World War II ships ==
=== Liberty ships operated ===
- William Ellery
- F. Marion Crawford
- Elihu Yale, on Feb. 15, 1944 was it by glider bomb and exploded off Anzio, while unloading ammunition
- Elinor Wylie, on Oct. 6, 1944 hit mine off Southern France, was towed to Toulon
- Robert J. Walker, on Dec. 25, 1944 was torpedoed and sank by U-862 off Sydney
- Russell H. Chittenden, on March 13, 1945, ran ashore and wrecked off New Guinea
- James Russell Lowell on Oct. 15, 1943 was torpedoed and damaged by U-371 off Algeria, beached Philippeville
- James W. Marshall on Sept. 15, 1943 was damaged by guided bomb off Salerno, towed to UK later on June 8, 1944. Sunk as part of Gooseberry Harbor blockship off Normandy beachhead. Later destroyed by storms.
- James W. Nesmith on April 7, 1945, was torpedoed and damaged by U-1024 in Irish Sea, beached at Holyhead, towed to Liverpool but was a lose. June 3, 1946 was towed to Bremerhaven, loaded with cargo of obsolete ammunition, towed to sea and scuttled
- Lydia M. Child, on April 27, 1943, was torpedoed and sunk by Japanese submarine I-178 off Australia
- Fitz-John Porter, on March 1, 1943, was torpedoed and sunk by U-518 off Brazil

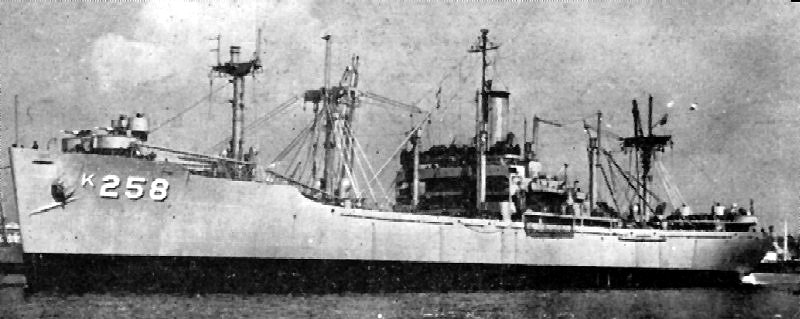
A Victory ship of World War II

Liberty ship of World War II

=== Victory ships operated ===
- St. Cloud Victory
- Twin Falls Victory
- Warwick Victory
- Beloit Victory
- Maryville Victory
- Duke Victory
- Clark Victory
- Netherlands Victory
- Hope Victory
- Joplin Victory
- Lawrence Victory
- Linfield Victory
  - War loses:
- Absaroka Dec. 24, 1941 torpedoed, but repaired
- West Ira June 20, 1942 torpedoed
- West Ivis Jan. 26, 1942 torpedoed
- West Notus June 1, 1942 shelled by submarine
- West Portal Feb. 5, 1943 torpedoed
- Elihu Yale Feb. 15, 1944 struck by aerial glider bomb
- Fitz John Porter March 1, 1943 torpedoed
- Starr King Feb. 10, 1943 torpedoed

== See also ==
- World War II United States Merchant Navy
- McCormick & Baxter Creosoting Company
