= West Coast lumber trade =

Maritime trade route on the US West Coast

The West Coast lumber trade was a maritime trade route on the West Coast of the United States. It carried lumber from the coasts of Northern California, Oregon, and Washington mainly to the port of San Francisco. The trade included direct foreign shipment from ports of the Pacific Northwest and might include another product characteristic of the region, salmon, as in the schooner Henry Wilson sailing from Washington state for Australia with "around 500,000 feet of lumber and canned salmon" in 1918.

The trade was instrumental in founding shipping empires such as the Dollar Steamship Company in which its founder, Captain Robert Dollar, emigrated from Scotland, worked in the lumber camps of Canada and, after moving to San Francisco in 1888 and buying timber tracts, founded a shipping line that extended to China.

== Lumber schooners ==
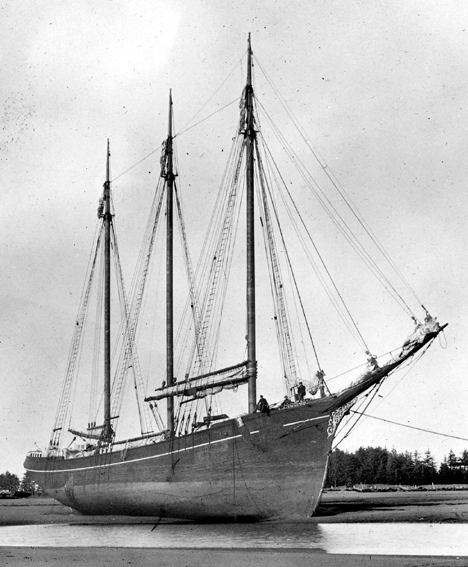
Lumber schooner C.A. Thayer

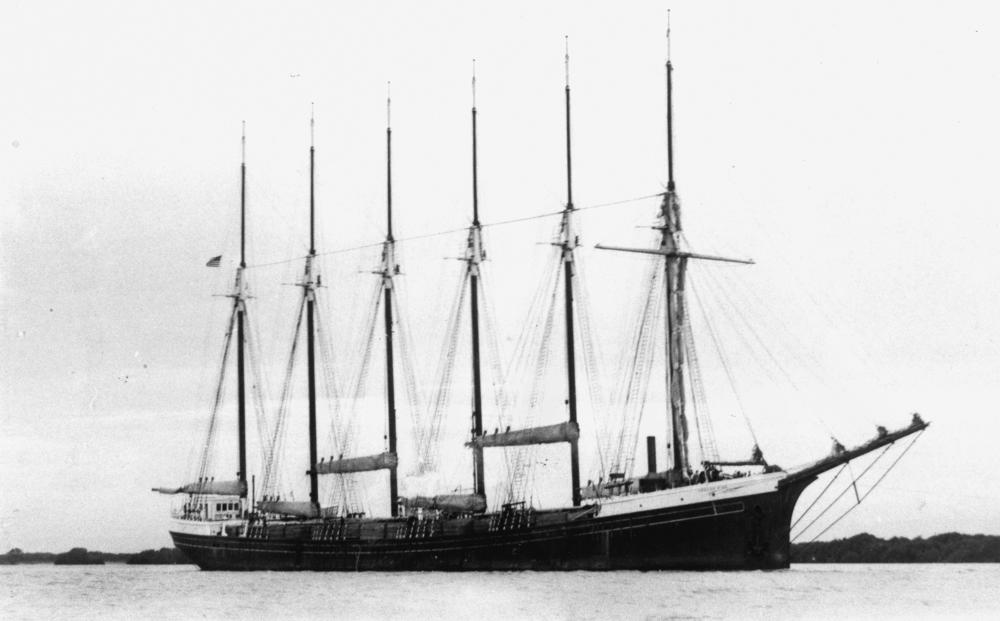
Six-masted lumber schooner Oregon Pine

As late as the California Gold Rush, New England lumber was still carried 13,000 miles around Cape Horn to San Francisco. But that started to change when Captain Stephen Smith (of the bark George Henry) established one of the first west coast lumber mill in a redwood forest near Bodega, California, in 1843. The first lumber mill on the west coast was established by John B. R. Cooper in Rancho El Molino near present-day Forestville, California. By the mid-1880s, more than 400 such mills operated within the forests of California's Humboldt County and along the shores of Humboldt Bay alone.

At first, the lumber was shipped in old square-riggers, but these aging ships were inefficient as they required a large crew to operate and were hard to load. Soon local shipyards opened to supply specialist vessels. In 1865 Hans Ditlev Bendixsen opened one of these yards at Fairhaven, California on Humboldt Bay adjacent to Eureka. Bendixsen built many vessels for the lumber trade, including the C.A. Thayer, now preserved at the San Francisco Maritime National Historical Park. He constructed 92 sailing vessels between 1869 and 1901, including 35 three-masters.

The lumber schooners were built of the same Douglas fir as the planks they carried. (Schooner Oregon Pine was named after the tree.) They had shallow drafts for crossing coastal bars, uncluttered deck arrangements for ease of loading, and were especially handy for maneuvering into the tiny, Northern California ports. Many West Coast lumber schooners were also rigged without topsails, a configuration referred to as being baldheaded. This rig simplified tacking into the strong westerlies when bound north. Crews liked baldheaders because no topmast meant no climbing aloft to shift or furl the sails. If more sail was desired then it could be set by being hoisted from the deck.

The demands of navigating the Redwood Coast, however, and a boom in the lumber industry in the 1860s called for the development of handy two-masted schooners able to operate in the tiny dog-hole ports that served the sawmills. Many sites along this stretch of coast used chutes and wire trapeze rigging to load the small coastal schooners with lumber. Most of these ports were so small they were called dog-hole ports—since they supposedly were just big enough to allow a dog to get in and out. Dozens of these were built, and almost any small cove or river outlet was a prime candidate for a chute. Each dog-hole was unique, which was why schooner captains often sailed back and forth to the same ports to load. The mariners were often forced to load right among the rocks and cliffs in the treacherous surf.

The schooner rig dominated the lumber trade, since its fore-and-aft rigging permitted sailing closer to the wind, easier entry to small ports, and smaller crews than square-rigged vessels. These ships needed to return to the lumber ports without the expense of loading ballast. Shipyards built some smaller schooners with centerboards that retracted. This helped the flat-bottomed vessels to enter shallow water.

Referring to the barque Hesperus built in 1882, Hewitt R Jackson wrote, "the form of the West Coast lumber vessels had become well established and were a radical departure from the New England built ships." Because lumber is a bulk cargo that does not require shelter, and is difficult to stow below decks, lumber ships from yards such as the Hall Brothers in Port Blakely, Washington were built without the between decks of the New England "Downeasters." "Close to half of their cargo was stowed as deckload – that is above deck."

Jackson also wrote that a triangle trade had developed at this time, with "lumber out to Australia, coal to Hawaii, and sugar to San Francisco. The return cargoes were compact and heavy, thus no need for the conventional deep hull form.".

Recently, evidence of the local trade in Northern California was unearthed when a historic oven used in Fort Bragg from 1909 until 2003 was discovered to be built with "hundreds of century-old bricks, many stamped with the name of the California brick factory from which they had come: Richmond, Stockton and Corona." Press coverage states that "these bricks had come north from San Francisco as ballast on lumber ships. In the years after the 1906 quake, Fort Bragg sent tons of timber to the city to be used in rebuilding. Coming home, the ships used bricks from Bay Area factories for weight and for new construction in Fort Bragg."

Eventually, however, steam-powered vessels proved more dependable than sail, and railroads gained greater penetration of the coastal regions. Sailing vessels continued to compete with steamships and railroads well into the 20th century, but the last purpose-built sailing lumber schooner was launched in 1905.

== Steam schooners ==
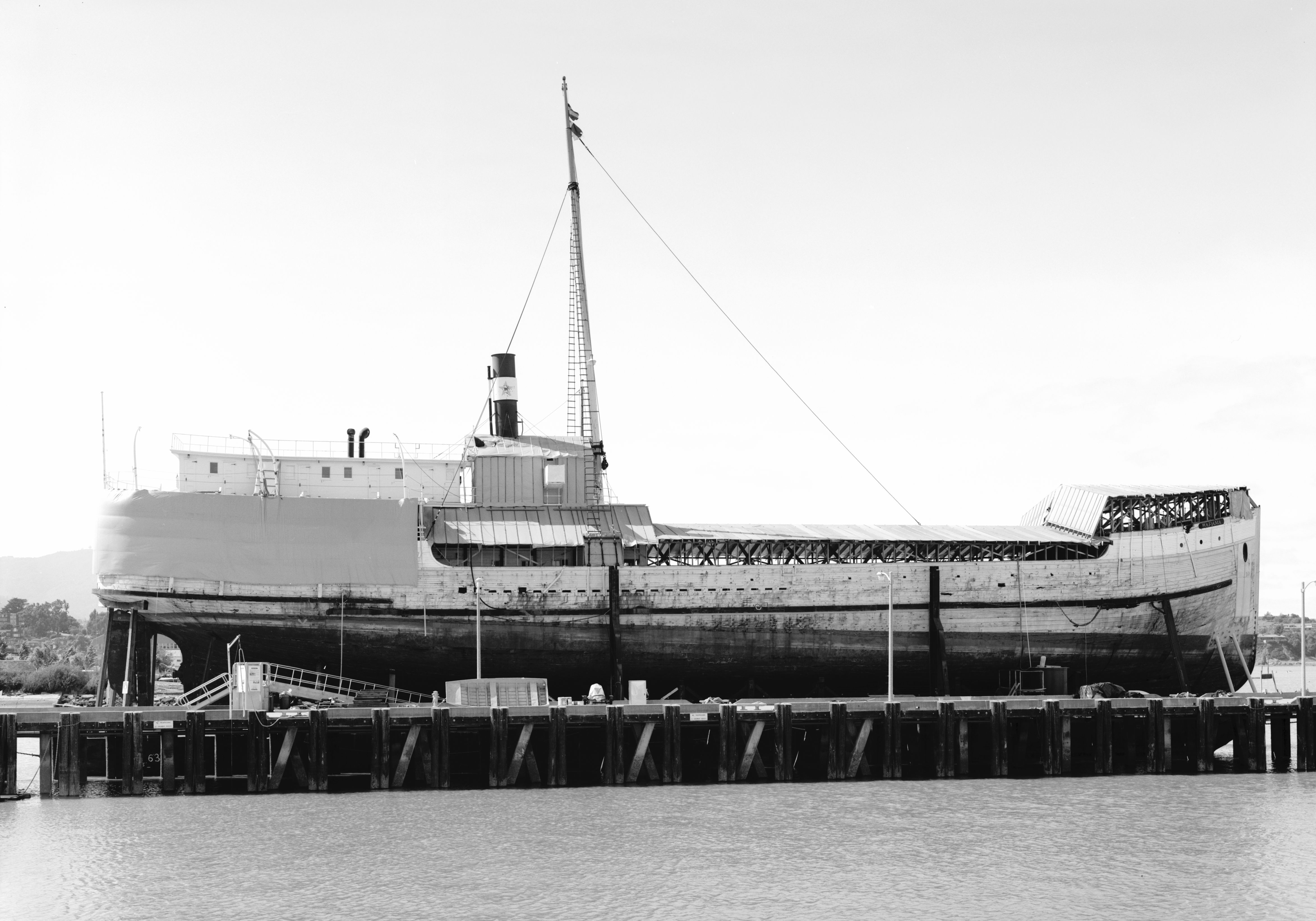
Steam schooner Wapama

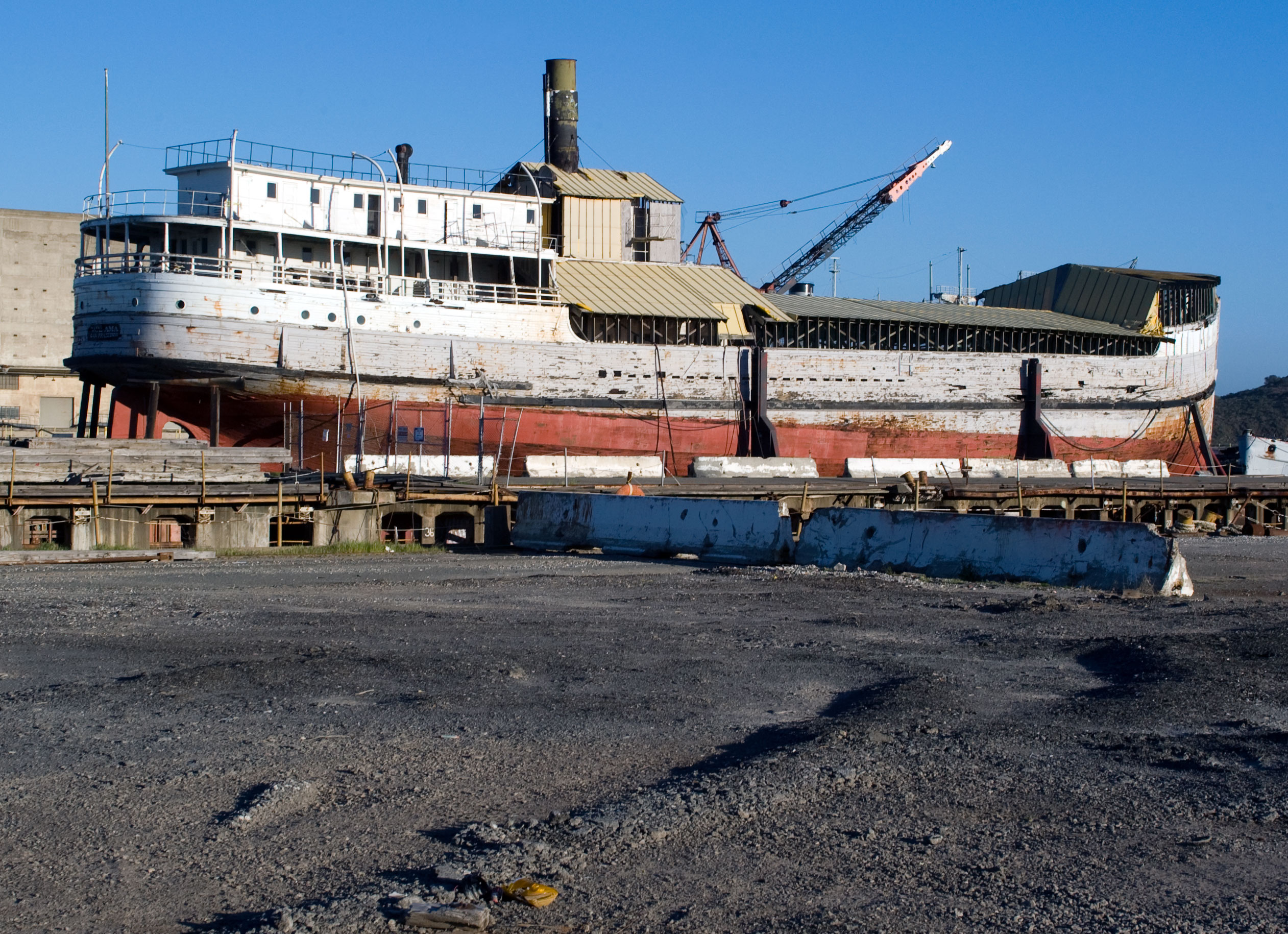
Wapama in 2005

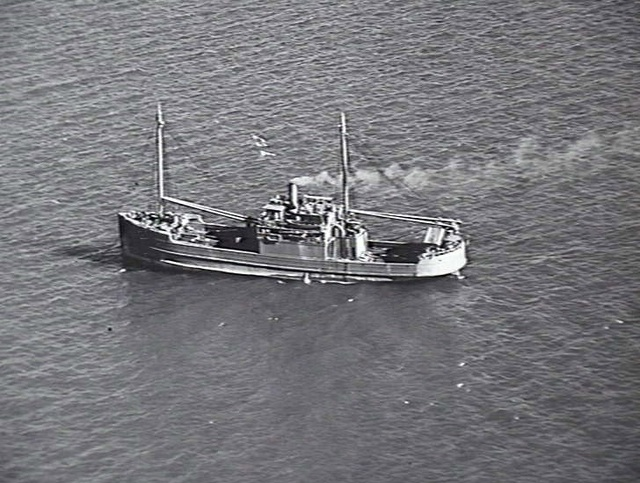
Esther Johnson, Australian waters as U.S. Army X-9

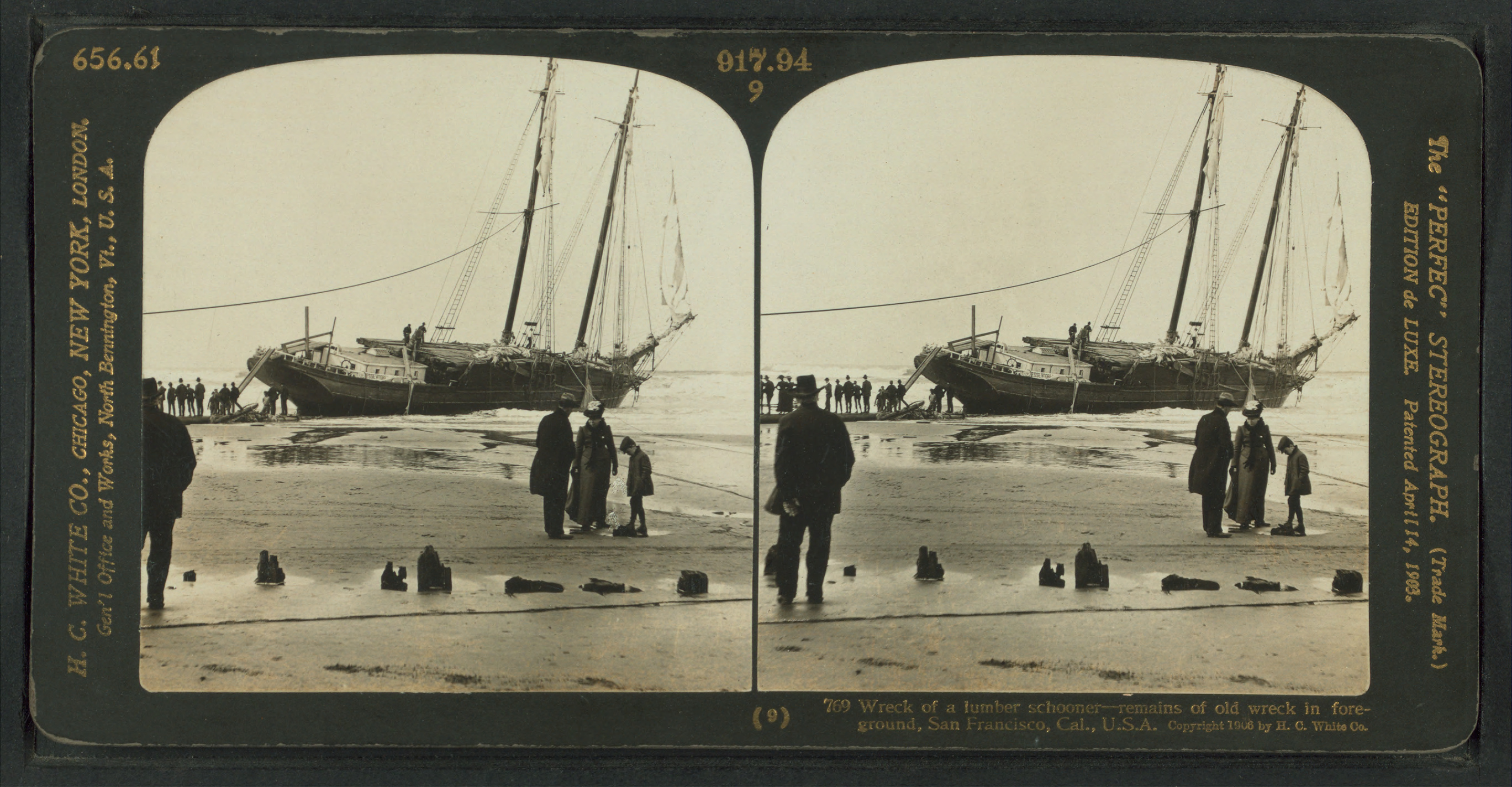
Wreck of a lumber schooner, San Francisco, CA

Soon steam schooners (wooden but powered) replaced the small two-masters in the dog-hole trade and larger schooners, such as the still existing C.A. Thayer and the Wawona, were built for longer voyages and bigger cargo. West Coast shipyards continued to build sail-rigged lumber schooners until 1905 and wooden steam schooners until 1923. In 1907 observers noted the increase in size of schooners. The first three-masted schooner built on the Coast was launched in 1875. It was also the first lumber schooner to exceed 300 tons. Ship wrights built the first four-master in 1886 and the first five-master in 1896. The later were more generally involved in the overseas trade. Sail schooners grew from fifty to 1,100 tons during this period. More than 50 major shipbuilders operated on the Pacific Coast during the era of the coast wise schooners. Demand for coastwise lumber shipping continued until after the First World War and total lumber transported by the railroads did not exceed its seaborne competition until about 1905. Even in the 1870s mills shipped lumber directly from some dog-holes to Asia and South America.

The last wooden steam lumber schooner built was Esther Johnson constructed by Matthews Shipbuilding, Hoquiam, Washington in 1923 for the A. B. Johnson Lumber Company. Esther Johnson was 1,104 GRT of wooden construction with planking of three inch Douglas fir, 208 ft 4 in (63.50 m) long by 43 ft 6 in (13.26 m) and with 15 ft 2 in (4.62 m) draft. On 29 March 1943 the ship was purchased by the War Shipping Administration and by June had arrived in Australia to become part of the U.S. Army's Southwest Pacific Area fleet as X-9. Esther Johnson arrived in Milne Bay on 4 October 1943 and, capable of transporting 100 ft (30 m) wooden piles sufficient to build an entire pier, was instrumental in building piers at the bases at Lae, Finschhafen in New Guinea and Tacloban in the Philippines. The ship was bombed on arrival at Lae and both bombed and strafed at Tacloban and at war's end was badly damaged by shipworms. The badly leaking ship returned from Manila to Melbourne for repairs and then returned to the Philippines going into the reserve fleet on 20 December 1947 at Subic Bay before being sold to the Philippine government on 23 February 1948. The older and slightly larger Barbara C, built as Pacific, also served in the Southwest Pacific in the same role.

== See also ==
- History of the west coast of North America
- Hans Ditlev Bendixsen, shipbuilder 1842–1902
- C.A. Thayer, schooner built in 1895, now on display in San Francisco
- Lyman D. Foster, four-masted schooner 1892-1913
- Wawona (schooner), 1897–1947
- Inca, five-masted schooner 1896–1920
- Johanna Smith, schooner 1917–1932
- Wapama, 1915 schooner, dismantled in 2013
- Captain Robert Dollar, 1844–1932 shipping magnate
