= Port Blakely, Bainbridge Island, Washington =

Neighborhood of Bainbridge Island, Washington, U.S.

Coordinates: 47°35′57.7″N 122°30′33.7″W

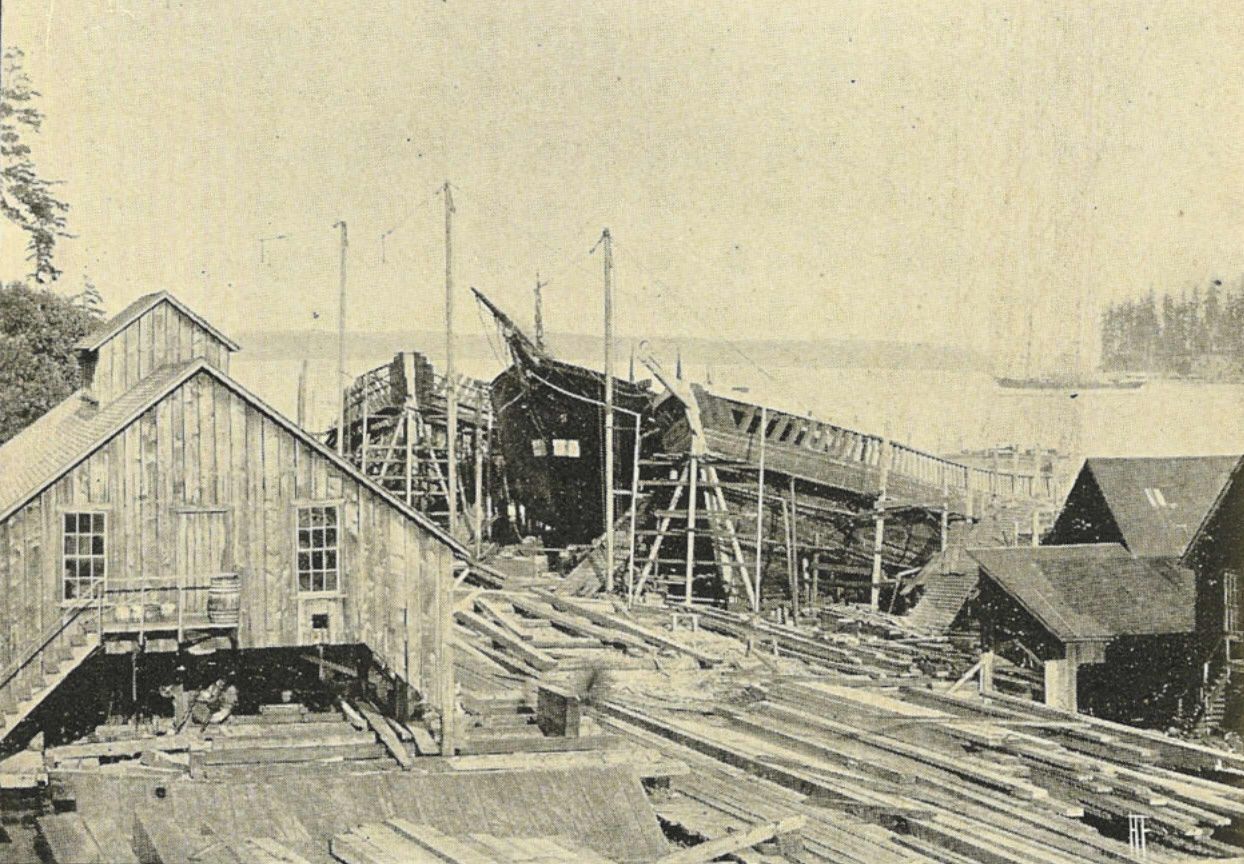
Hall Brothers' Shipyard, Port Blakely, circa 1900

Port Blakely is a community of Bainbridge Island, Washington in the western United States. It is located on the east side of the island, slightly to the south. The center of Port Blakely is generally defined as the intersection of Blakely Hill Road and Blakely Avenue NE, although the wider area is generally also known as Port Blakely.

The community's name was at one time spelled as Port Blakeley.

== Hall Brothers Shipyard and Port Blakely Mill ==
Port Blakely was named in 1841 by the Wilkes Expedition for the American naval officer Johnston Blakely.

In 1863, William Renton began operating a sawmill at Port Blakeley. In 1880, brothers Isaac, Winslow and Henry Knox Hall moved their shipyard from Port Ludlow, Washington to a site near the Port Blakely Lumber Mill. At one point, this mill was "the world's largest sawmill under one roof." The lumber mills and shipyard of Port Blakely were adjoined by extensive living quarters and public amenities for mill workers and their families.

"The first true five-masted schooner built on the West Coast was the Inca, built at Port Blakely in 1896." H.K. Hall a 1,237-ton five-masted schooner, was launched here in 1902.

"Between 1881 and 1904, the Hall Brothers launched 77 vessels of every size and rig, including barks, barkentines, three-, four-, and five-masted schooners, steamers, a tug, a government revenue cutter and several yachts. Hall Brothers was largely responsible for building most of the schooners for the Pacific Coast lumber trade."

The shipyard was moved to Winslow in 1903.

== Associated media ==
In his 1915 book, Travels in Alaska, naturalist John Muir describes a voyage he took from Portland to Glacier Bay in June 1890 on the steamer City of Pueblo in which the "pleasant company" at the dining table included an "old Scandinavian sea captain who was having a new bark built at Port Blakely."

Port Blakely was featured in the documentary Port Blakely: Memories of a Mill Town by film maker Lucy Ostrander and her husband Don Sellers.

== See also ==
- Inca (schooner)
- List of Bainbridge Island communities
- Lyman D. Foster (schooner)
