= Hyak =

Hyak may refer to:

- Hyak, Washington, United States
- MV Hyak, a ferry boat in service in Washington between 1966 and 2009
- Hyak (1909 steamboat), a steamship in service in Washington between 1909 and 1941
- Hyak (sternwheeler), a steamboat in service in British Columbia between 1892 and 1906
- Hyak Motorsports, a NASCAR team
