= Smith Tower =

Historic skyscraper in Seattle, Washington, United States

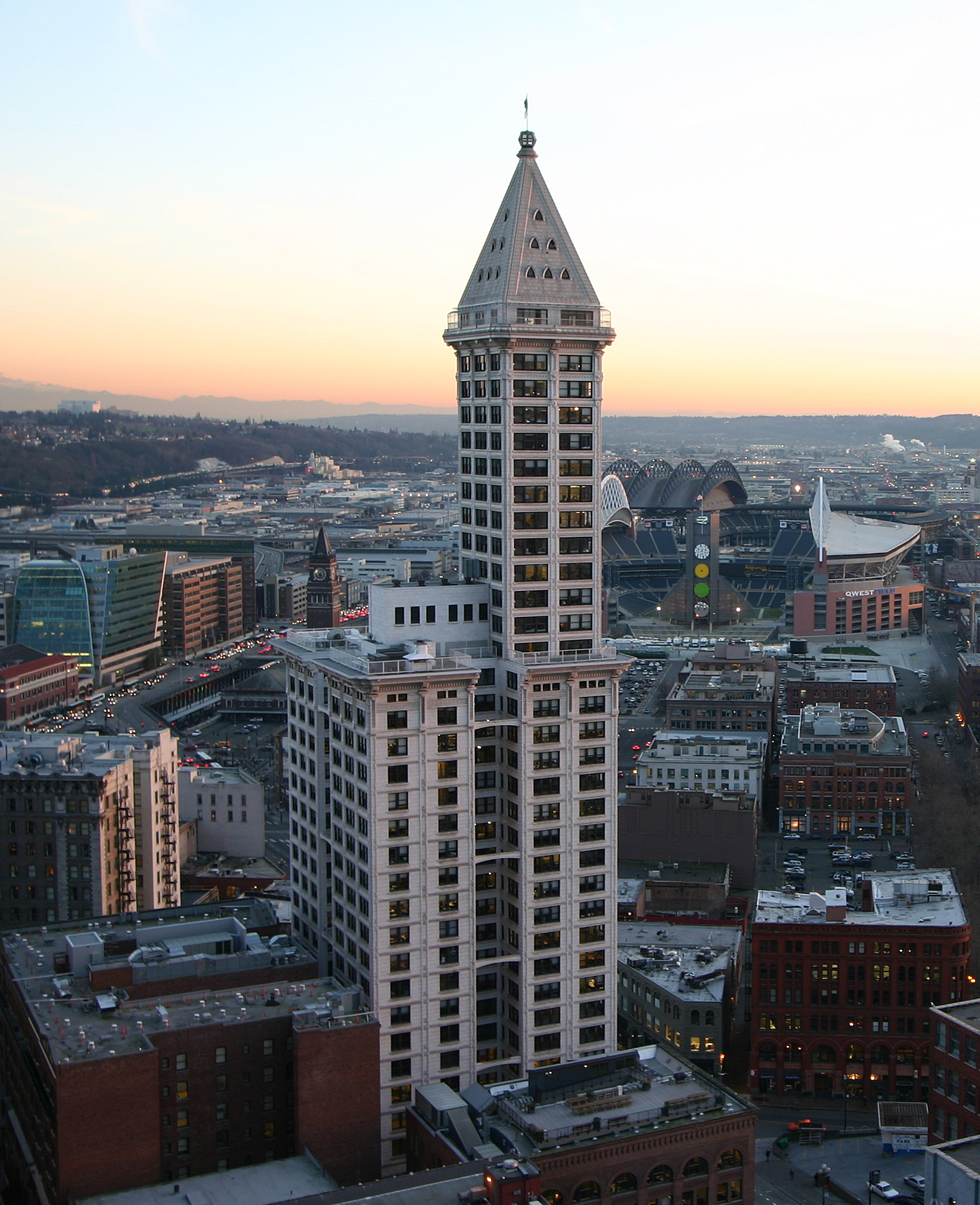
- Smith Tower as seen from the Pacific Building.

- Location within Downtown Seattle
- Alternative names: L.C. Smith Building (1914–1929)

Record height
- Tallest in Seattle and Washington from 1914 to 1962^{[I]}
- Preceded by: Hoge Building (Seattle); Key Bank Center (Tacoma/statewide)
- Surpassed by: Space Needle

General information
- Type: Commercial offices Residential
- Location: 500 Second Avenue; Seattle, Washington, U.S.
- Coordinates: 47.602092°N 122.331803°W
- Construction started: 1911
- Completed: 1914
- Cost: US$1.5 million
- Owner: Unico Properties

Height
- Antenna spire: 484 ft (148 m)
- Roof: 462 ft (141 m)

Technical details
- Floor count: 38
- Floor area: 28,275 m^{2} (304,350 sq ft)
- Lifts/elevators: 7

Design and construction
- Architects: Gaggin & Gaggin
- Main contractor: E.E. Davis Company

Seattle Landmark
- Designated: June 12, 1984

Smith Tower is a skyscraper in the Pioneer Square neighborhood of Seattle, Washington, United States. Completed in 1914, the 38-story, 462 ft (141 m) tower was among the tallest skyscrapers outside New York City at the time of its completion. It was the tallest building west of the Mississippi River until the completion of the Kansas City Power & Light Building in 1931. It remained the tallest building on the U.S. West Coast for nearly half a century, until the Space Needle overtook it in 1962.

The tower is named after its builder, the firearm and typewriter magnate Lyman Cornelius Smith (unrelated to Horace Smith of Smith & Wesson), but its construction was largely overseen by his son Burns Lyman Smith after his father's 1910 death and would remain under the ownership of the Smith family into the 1940s. It was originally known as the L.C. Smith Building until the Smith Tower became its official name in 1929. It was designated as a Seattle landmark in 1984.

== History ==
=== Conception and design ===
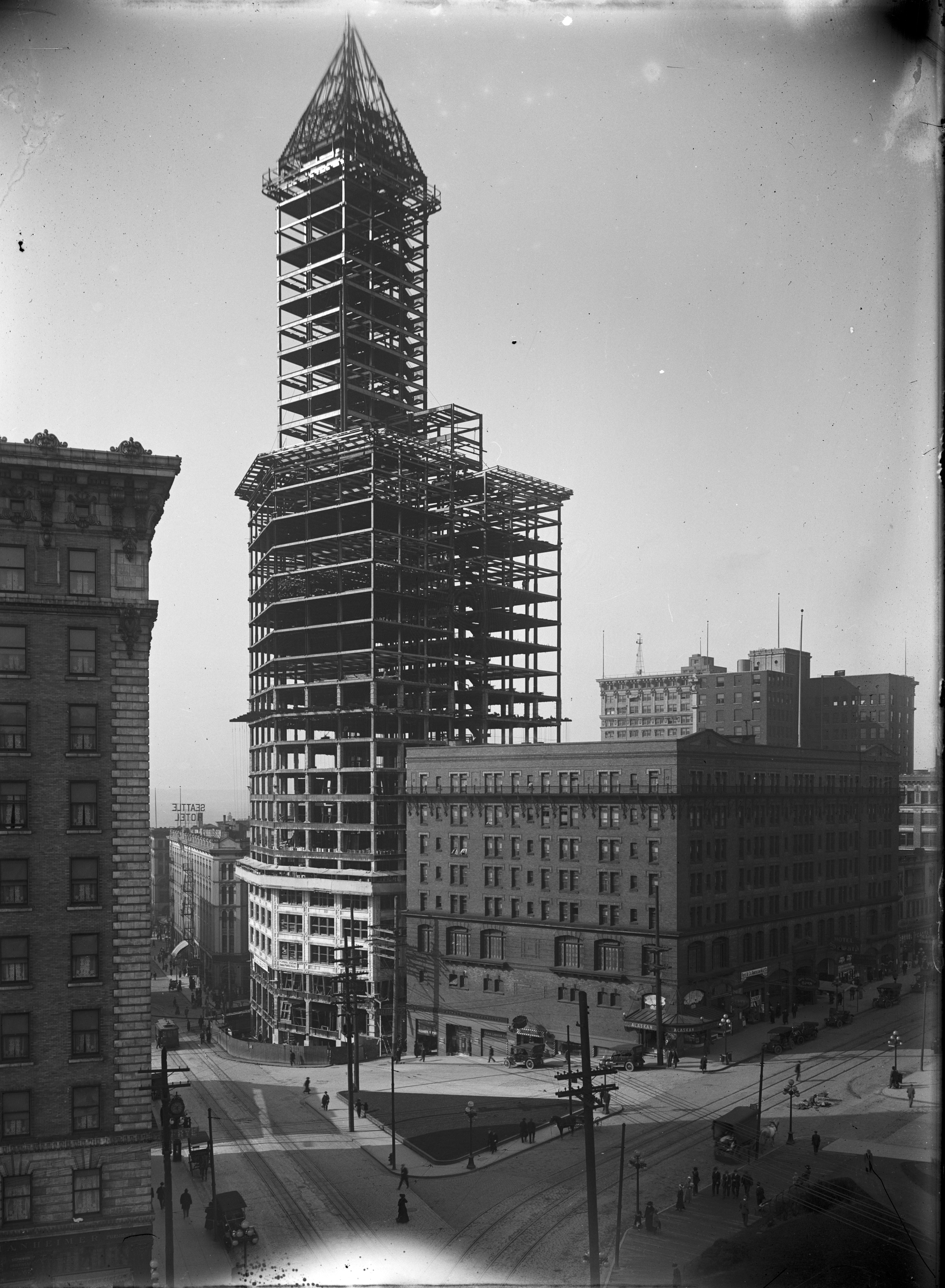
Smith Tower construction, February 1913

In the wake of the Klondike Gold Rush, Eastern financial interest in Seattle was at an all-time high. Prominent local attorney James Clise, who represented numerous capitalists in New York and Boston, was responsible for many of the land transactions that saw numerous new office buildings built in the city. Among his largest clients at the turn of the century was Syracuse, New York millionaire industrialist Lyman Cornelius Smith and his brother Wilbert Lewis Smith who, through Clise, purchased and developed numerous buildings in Seattle's Pioneer Square district. L.C. was soon the city's biggest taxpayer and the largest individual owner of Seattle real estate in the country. Among those properties was the odd-shaped lot at the Northeast corner of Yesler Way and Second Avenue, then known as the Wirth Corner (or Bailey Corner) which L.C. purchased in May 1899 from William E. Bailey (Builder of the nearby Broderick Building), who had built a 1-story brick building on the lot following the Great Seattle Fire with intentions of building something more substantial before the Panic of 1893 struck. Smith, who saw great potential in the site, made no immediate plans to build, but would visit Seattle to inspect the property.

During a trip to Seattle in 1909, Smith began planning a 14-story building for the Bailey Corner. After consulting with Clise about what kind of building Seattle's economy would bear, his son, Burns Lyman Smith, convinced him to build instead a much taller skyscraper to steal the crown from rival city Tacoma's National Realty Building as the tallest west of the Mississippi River. Smith chose the Syracuse architectural firm of Gaggin and Gaggin to design his tower and in February 1910, Edwin H. Gaggin arrived in Seattle with blueprints in hand and an official announcement for a 26-story building that would be the highest west of the Mississippi. With construction proposed to begin in June 1910, instead came the announcement that month that Smith would be willing to build to an unheard of 40-floors (35-story base, 5-story tower) on the condition that Seattle's city hall and civic center not be moved uptown from their property at 3rd Avenue and Yesler Way on the adjoining block. With the passage of a bond to purchase the city hall site and assurance from mayor Hiram C. Gill and the city council, the proposed Smith Tower would be the third tallest office building in the world behind only the Metropolitan Life Insurance Company Tower and Singer Building in New York City.

With L.C.'s health declining and other business interests in New York requiring his attention, he put construction of the $1,000,000 building in the hands of B.L. Smith and E.H. Gaggin, who returned to Seattle in October 1910 with the final plans for a 467-foot (142 m), 42-story building that would incorporate all the modern features of the Metropolitan Life and Singer Buildings; at his son's suggestion, the building would have a 22-story base and a 20-story tower. With a steel-frame and concrete structure, the building would be clad in granite at the base, and the rest in gleaming white terra cotta that would, according to local media, "cast the rays of the sun in a blaze that should be seen 15 or 20 miles". The building would be equipped with eight high-speed elevators that could carry an estimated 22,000 passengers per day. A heating plant would be built in the basement as well as a water cooler to supply drinking water to all the tenants, that would be fed by a 12,000 gallon tank in the pyramid roof of the tower. The first building permit was issued on October 20, 1910, but the elder Smith died the following month and never saw his building break ground. The original permit, however, was delayed by concerns from the city about the ground soil conditions of the site and the use of wired safety glass on the windows, among other things. Because the building already exceeded the city's existing building codes, excessive reviews and negotiations were required before the building could get final approval. All was settled by February 1911 when the final building permit was issued on the 24th.

After settling the final details of the building with the Smith Estate that had been left in limbo after L.C.'s death and putting to rest the public's doubt that it would even be built, bids for construction were opened at Gaggin & Gaggin's Syracuse, New York office to contractors across the country on May 10, 1911. Over 160 bids were submitted; 56 firms placed bids on the general construction contract alone and it would take the Smith heirs nearly two months to review them all. While bids were being prepared, tenants of the old Wirth Corner building were served notices to vacate the building by June 1 to prepare for its demolition. To celebrate the beginning of construction of the Smith Tower as well as the Lake Washington Ship Canal, Hoge Building and other major projects underway around Seattle, the city declared June 1 Progress and Prosperity Day and threw a parade to visit all these sites attended by delegations from all over Puget Sound. At the Smith Tower site a single brick was removed from the old building to ceremonially mark the beginning of construction, though actual demolition work wouldn't begin for several weeks. Although the winning contractors were chosen and notified by the end of June, the signing of contracts and beginning of construction now relied on the final settlement of L.C. Smith's estate, which would deed the Smith Tower site to his son Burns Lyman Smith by the end of August.

=== Construction and opening ===
On September 5, 1911, the first contracts for general construction and excavation were signed by the New York-based Whitney-Steen Company, who had recently constructed the Daniels & Fisher Tower in Denver, Colorado and had several international projects under their belts. They would in turn contract the American Bridge Company to provide and assemble the nearly 5,000 tons of steel from their own foundry at Ambridge, Pennsylvania that would be required to build the Smith Tower's frame. Several local firms were awarded early contracts including Charles W. Rodgers (tiling), the Rautman Plumbing & Heating Company, and the Agutter-Griswold Company for the electric wiring. The Harper-Hill Company run by T.S. Lippy, who operated a brick plant near Southworth at Harper that had previously supplied bricks for the Puget Sound Naval Shipyard and the Moore Theatre, won the contract for supplying the common brick that would insulate the building's walls. Representatives from the Whitney-Steen Company arrived in Seattle in late October and set up their construction office on the 6th floor of the Smith-owned Pacific Block (which would later be known as the Smith Tower Annex). They would soon be joined by H.W. Thompson, also of Syracuse, who would act as supervising architect. Most tenants vacated the old building by October 1 but many more insisted on remaining until the last possible moment and arrangements were made to excavate around them until the structural steel and other needed equipment was scheduled to arrive in February 1912 at which time construction would go into full swing. Selective demolition began on November 1, officially marking the start of construction.

Excavation continued day and night throughout November and December 1911, only being stopped when the derrick used for removing spoils collapsed, narrowly missing several workers. As the 25-foot (7.6 m) deep foundation was being dug and retaining walls built, rigorous geological tests of the ground soil were being undertaken by supervising architect Thompson. Several holes were bored into the ground to a depth of 123 feet (37 m), well below the proposed footing, and core samples were examined. A test box weighing 80 tons was constructed on equally placed pilings on the center of the property to monitor ground settling and test the weight capacity of the soil. Smith and Gaggin returned to Seattle in January 1912, where they would stay for several months to personally oversee construction of the building's base floors. Smith would bring with him to Seattle a 6-foot-tall (1.8 m) oil painting of the building, used for advertising literature, where it would stand on display in a nearby business. In an unparalleled advertising campaign, images of the Smith Tower would be displayed in every L.C. Smith Company office and published nationwide to promote Seattle as an up and coming metropolis. Postcards were published of the yet to be completed building and sent across the world.

From April to May 1912, while excavation of the foundation and retaining walls was wrapping up and while the contractors were still awaiting the delivery of the steel beams from Pennsylvania, further contracts were signed for building materials from local and national firms. Granite for the building's base floors would come from A.D. Gunn's quarry at Index, Washington and a further 1.5 million bricks were ordered from the Builders' Brick Company. One of the largest electrical contracts ever let outside of New York City was awarded to Nepage, McKenny & Co., who would install 18.5 miles of conduit and 60 miles (97 km) of light, power and telegraph cables throughout the building's 42 floors. Concrete pilings, the style and strength of which were determined based on the results of the geological tests, would be manufactured and driven by the Raymond Concrete Piling Company of New York. All marble work would be handled by the Vermont Marble Company of Proctor, Vermont and Mexican onyx used in the lobby would be provided by the New Pedrara Mexican Onyx Company of San Diego, California. Most metal work including wrought iron railings, bronze fixtures and the fireproof metal windows would be provided and installed by firms from New York and Chicago. The final contracts, for plastering and fireproofing, were awarded to Denver and Fargo firms, respectively, on July 8, 1912.

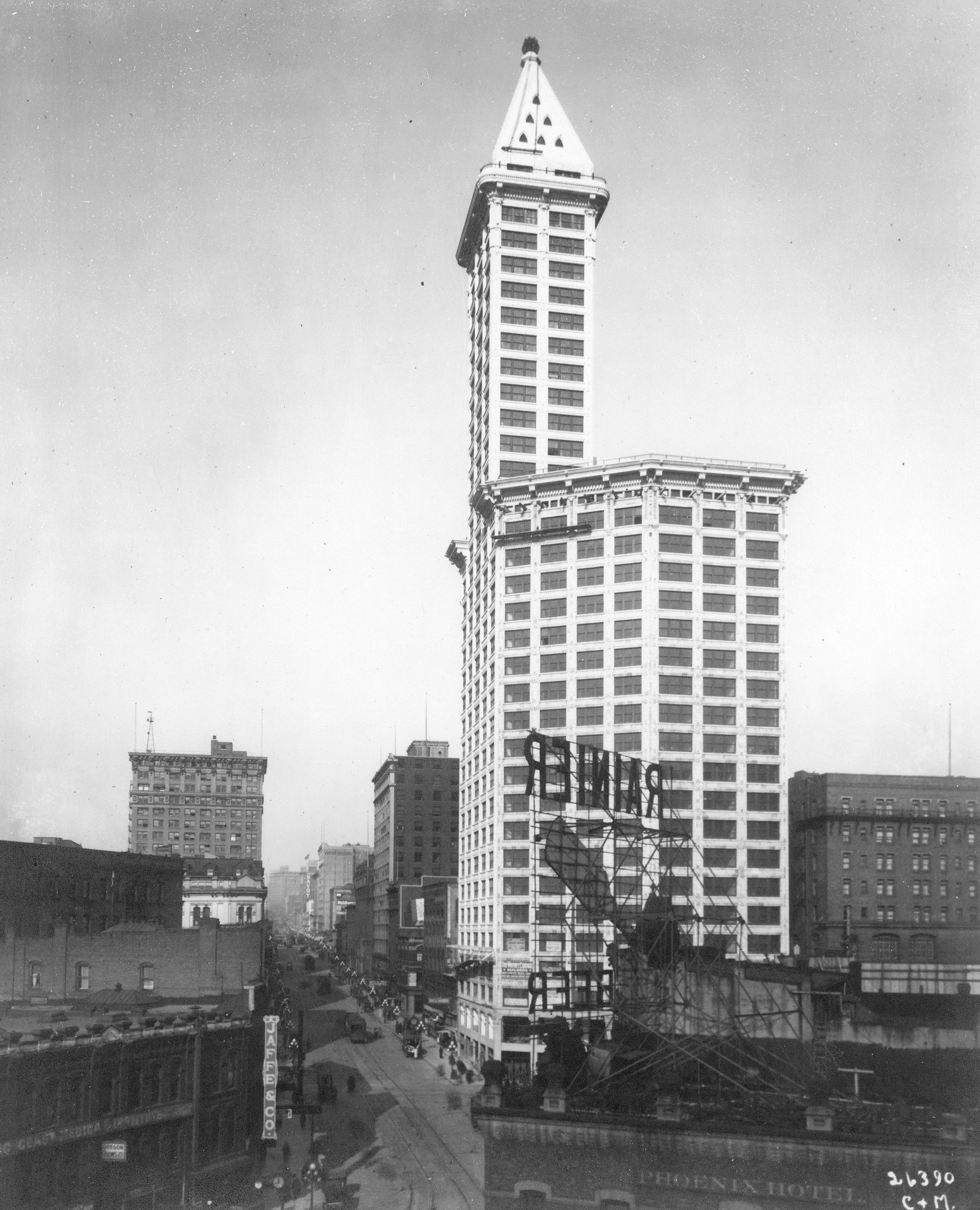
Smith Tower looking north on 2nd Avenue, 1914

By late July the first 40 carloads of steel for the tower's frame had arrived in the city, removing any lingering doubts of the project's reality among locals. The last of the 1,276 pilings were driven and the brick-lined reinforced concrete foundation was complete by the beginning of August and the steel frame began to rise rapidly out of the pit. The top of the first floor was reached by October as 140 more carloads of steel arrived. The first reported work-site injury occurred on October 15 when laborer J.O. Charest's foot was crushed by an iron girder and was later amputated. B.L. Smith returned to Seattle several days later with a group of New York businessmen to give an impromptu tour of the local banks and landmarks, including Seattle's then tallest building, the Hoge Building from whose roof they viewed the Smith Tower's construction site.

The building's steel frame took shape very quickly, with the final rivet being driven on the top of the 42nd floor on February 15, 1913. Seattle Times photographer Will T. Curtis scaled the building, which still lacked stairways above the 16th floor, to capture the event. One of the biggest incidents to happen during the building's construction occurred on the morning of February 20 when a 70-foot (21 m) wooden derrick weighing 3 tons fell from the 34th floor as it was being lowered, crashing through the roof of the building's base and piercing 13 floors. Miraculously there was not a single injury and damage was limited to repairing the holes in the concrete flooring. Construction proceeded without delay and steelwork was completed the very next day, marked by the raising of the American flag from the highest point by the superintendent and several of his men, who after a photoshoot featuring various daredevil poses around the flagpole, accidentally dropped their camera off the building, destroying it and the film. Concrete work and fireproofing were completed during the summer and the glistening terracotta façade began to rise over the steel frame. Before a completion date was in sight and the steel frame was even complete superintendent Thompson was bombarded by companies jockeying to rent entire floors in the building; 540 offices would be available in the main building with 13 suites in the tower, one per floor.

Although L.C. Smith did not live to see construction begin, his namesake building was completed in 1914 to a height of 143 m (469 ft) from curbside to the top of the pyramid, with a pinnacle height of 159 m (522 ft). Smith Tower opened to the public on July 4, 1914. Over 4,000 Seattleites rode to the 35th floor on opening day. The Chinese Room, whose name was retired following the 2016 renovation, derived from the carved teak ceiling and blackwood furniture that adorned the room on opening. The room was furnished by the last Empress of China, Cixi. Furnishings include the famous Wishing Chair. The chair incorporates a carved dragon and a phoenix, which, when combined, portends marriage. According to folklore, any wishful unmarried person who sits in it would be married within a year. The legend came true for Smith's daughter, who married in the Chinese Room itself.

=== Sales and renovations ===
Ivar Haglund of Ivar's restaurant fame bought the tower for $1.8 million in 1976. The building has been renovated twice, in 1986 and in 1999 (fully completed in 2000 for the latter). The government of King County considered purchasing the Smith Tower in 1996 for $7.5 million; they were a major tenant with 85,000 square feet (7,900 m^{2}), which represented half of the leasable office space, and sought to consolidate space around the historic King County Courthouse. The county government decided against using an option to buy the building from GE Capital. The Samis Foundation, a major downtown landowner, acquired the tower after the county government backed out. In 2006, the building was purchased by Walton Street Capital.

The burst of the dot-com bubble hurt Smith Tower by raising its vacancy rate to 26.1 percent, twice Seattle's commercial vacancy rate, as of December 21, 2001. The Walt Disney Internet Group, for example, at the time reduced its seven floors to four. By 2007, the occupancy rate had rebounded to about 90 percent, with new occupants such as Microsoft Live Labs.

Following the announced departure of the building's two largest occupants that included Disney, which moved to the Fourth and Madison Building, Walton Street Capital filed an unsuccessful application to convert the building into condominiums.

In 2011, CBRE Group reported that it had purchased a 2006 $42.5 million mortgage in default on the Smith Tower. The loan recipient was building owner Walton Street. When CBRE stepped in, the building was 70 percent vacant, its rental income was not covering its operating expenses, and its value was assessed by the county to be less than half of its 2006 mortgage. Smith Tower was sold to CBRE at a public foreclosure auction on March 23, 2012.

In the spring of 2012 Smith Tower experienced a brief revitalization in the form of new companies moving into some of its empty floors including Portent, Inc., Aukema & Associates, Push Design, and Rialto Communications.

In January 2015, Seattle-based real estate investment and operating company Unico Properties bought Smith Tower for $73.7 million. Later that year, the new owners stopped the visitor tour and began remodeling the public areas, including the Chinese Room, which had been closed since 2014. A new speakeasy-themed restaurant, with Prohibition era-inspired food and drink was built on the observatory floor, in the same space as the Chinese Room, which was permanently closed. Parts of the Chinese Room decor and furniture, such as the Wishing Chair and carved teak ceilings, were used in this new restaurant.

A revised Smith Tower self-guided visitor tour, with new exhibits, resumed on August 25, 2016, along with the opening of the observation floor bar, open to tour ticket holders at a cost of $19.14 — the price being a reference to the date of the building. A discount is offered with a Washington State driver's license. Access to the bar without paying for the tour requires a cover charge of about half that price. A new retail store on the ground floor was also opened following the renovation. The building was sold to Goldman Sachs in October 2018 as part of a $750 million package of Unico properties in Seattle and Denver.

The building was put up for sale in 2023 and sold in August 2024 to GT Capital, investment firms, and several unnamed "prominent Seattle families". By the end of the year, eleven new leases had been signed for space in the building, including a ground-floor space for Cafe Vita; 55 percent remained unoccupied.

== Description ==
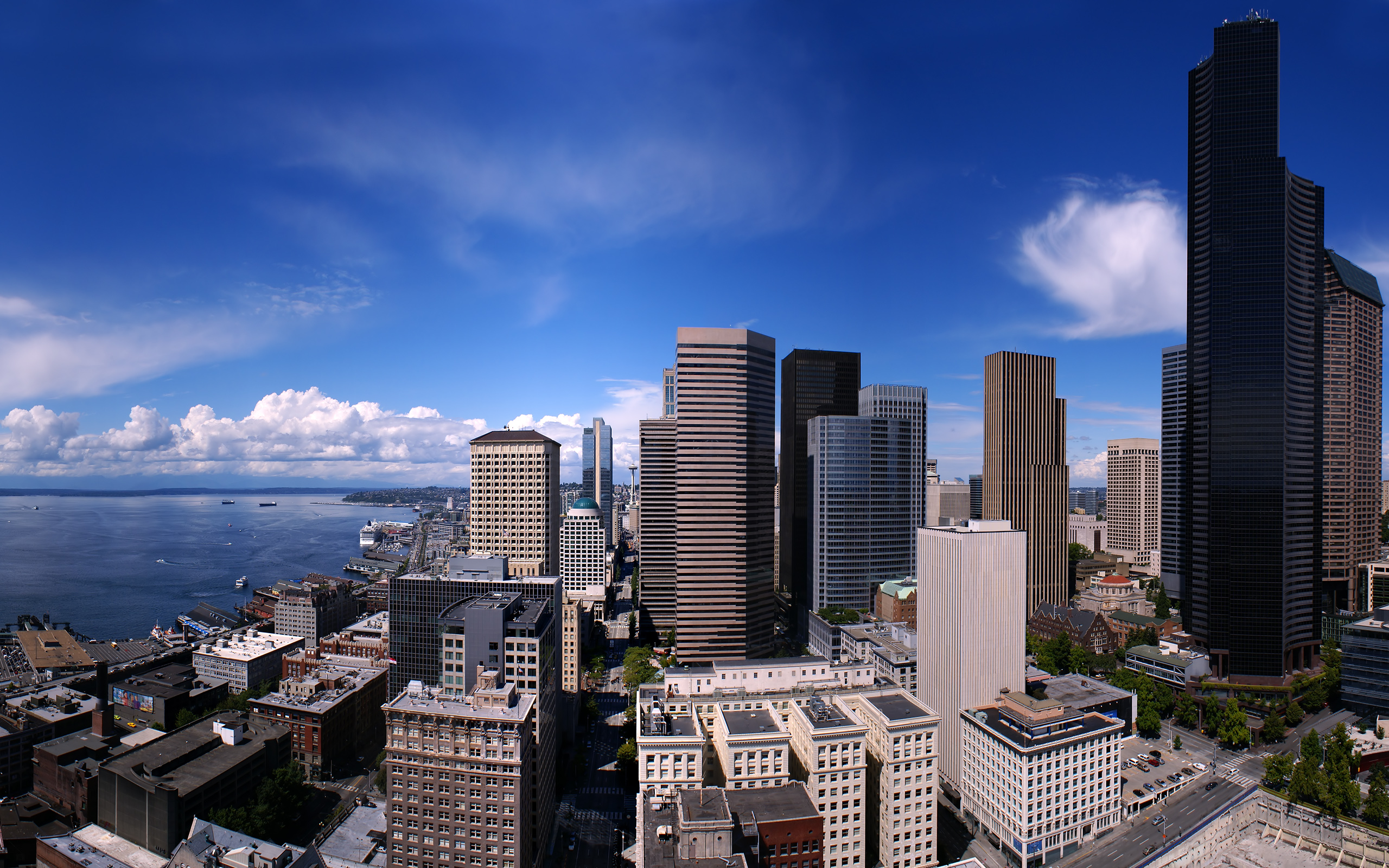
Looking north from the observation deck, August 2007

Smith Tower is an example of neoclassical architecture. Its outer skin is granite on the first and second floors, and terracotta on the rest. The exterior has been washed only once in 1976.

The building was one of the last on the West Coast to employ elevator operators. The Otis Elevator Company provided the elevators, which have brass surfaces. The original doors were latticed scissor gates, so a rider could see into each hallway and through the glass walls in front of each office. The elevators were automated and modernized beginning in 2017, for faster service time and seismic safety, with new glass doors still allowing riders a view into the hallways and lobbies.

After the restoration in the early 1990s, workers removed the 10,000-US-gallon (38,000 L) water tank in the top of the tower. The resulting space along with a former maintenance man's apartment became a three-story penthouse, the only residence in the building. It was occupied in 2010 by a family of four. The penthouse apartment was listed on public markets in 2021 for $17,000 per month.

The building is crowned by an 8-foot-wide (2.4 m) glass dome illuminated by blue light, except during December when it is changed to green.

== In popular culture ==
In 2012, Death Cab for Cutie frontman Benjamin Gibbard paid tribute to the Smith Tower in the song "Teardrop Windows".

== See also ==
- Smith Tower Annex
