= Interurban Building (Seattle) =

- U.S. Historic district – Contributing property
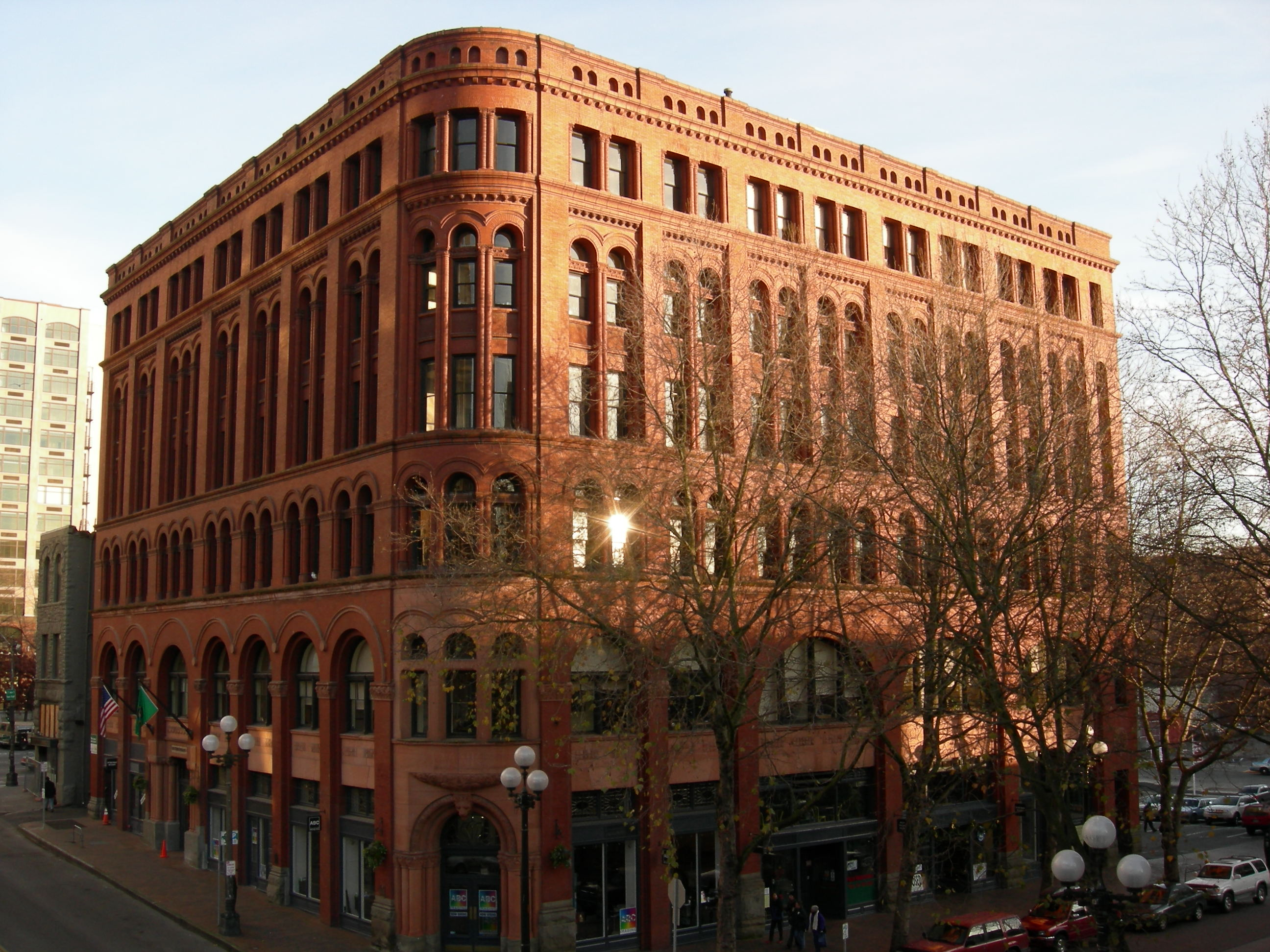
- The building's exterior, 2007

- Location within Downtown Seattle Location within Washington (state)
- Location: 102 Occidental Way S Seattle, Washington
- Coordinates: 47°36′5.24″N 122°19′56.95″W
- Built: 1890–1891
- Built by: Matthew Dow
- Architect: John B. Parkinson
- Architectural style: Romanesque Revival; Richardsonian Romanesque
- Part of: Pioneer Square Historic District (ID70000086)
- Designated CP: June 22, 1970

The Interurban Building, formerly known as the Seattle National Bank Building (1890–1899), the Pacific Block (1899–1930) and the Smith Tower Annex (1930–1977), is a historic office building located at Yesler Way and Occidental Way S in the Pioneer Square neighborhood of Seattle, Washington, United States. Built from 1890 to 1891 for the then recently formed Seattle National Bank, it is one of the finest examples of Richardsonian Romanesque architecture in the Pacific Northwest and has been cited by local architects as one of the most beautiful buildings in downtown Seattle. It was the breakthrough project of young architect John Parkinson, who would go on to design many notable buildings in the Los Angeles area in the late 19th and early 20th century.

The Seattle National Bank would vacate the building after only five years, followed by numerous legal battles between its owners, creditors and builders that ultimately led to the foreclosure of the building. It came under the ownership of New York industrialist Lyman Cornelius Smith who would rename it the Pacific Block in 1899. From 1904 to 1928, the Puget Sound Electric Railway's Seattle–Tacoma interurban line terminated in front of the building and the former bank lobby was used as a ticket office and waiting room. The building was threatened with demolition several times in the 1910s and 1920s but plans to replace the building with a skyscraper always fell through. The building underwent a major interior modernization beginning in 1929 under L.C. Smith's heirs, which included demolition of the entire Southeast wing of the building. The building was renamed again to the Smith Tower Annex, which it would remain until its most recent restoration in the late 1970s after which it was renamed the Interurban Building as a nod to its role in local transportation. It was listed on the National Register of Historic Places in 1970 as a contributing property to the Pioneer Square Historic District.

== History ==
=== Yesler's Claim ===
The site of the Interurban Building as well as most of Pioneer Square was once part of the 1852 donation land claim of Henry Yesler and as the city grew he would gradually sell off or lease lots to prospective settlers as he needed the funds. By the late 1880s the lots at what was then the Southeast corner of Mill Street and Second Avenue South, still owned by Yesler, were covered by a collection of wooden shacks and lodging houses, the earliest dating back to the late 1860s. (Note: In the early 1880s the building at the Southeast corner was the auction house of J.M. Pearlman and in the several years before the great fire, was occupied by the salesroom of the Lake Union Furniture Manufacturing Company, which had established a factory at the eponymous lake in 1883.) Among these early hostelries and adjoining several Chinese laundrys was the Wisconsin House, located over the Star Saloon where it is said that anti-Chinese sentiment that culminated in the Seattle riot of 1886 began.

In February 1889 Yesler sold the 2 lots to a group of investors consisting of J.M. Thompson, Fred E. Sander and George M. Boman, all three of which were involved with real estate development as well as having stakes in the Lake Washington Cable Railway Company. The sale price was $85,000 in a deal that would have the buyers paying $75,000 up front and the remainder on January 1, 1890, with the shrewd Yesler insisting on holding onto the property in the interim to continue collecting valuable rent on the tenants and thus delaying the buyers' intentions of building a large brick building on the site. Yesler would use the proceeds from this sale to fund the further construction of his Pioneer Block which had just broken ground. 4 months after the sale the Great Seattle Fire would clear the property and after a brief occupation by tents housing the burned-out businesses, the subsequent regrading in early 1890 would raise the streets around the property 18 feet above the original grade, leaving a dangerous hole in the ground that would claim at least one life.

=== The Seattle National Bank ===
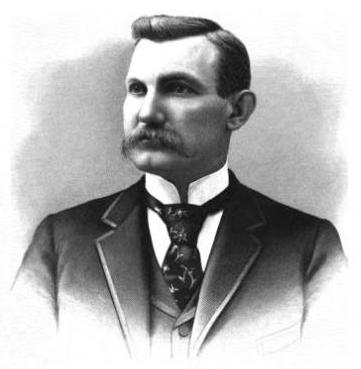
W. R. Ballard (c. 1890) was largely responsible for the building's construction.

The Seattle National Bank was incorporated in February 1889 with George W. E. Griffith as president, William Rankin Ballard as vice-president and Fred Warde as cashier. Griffith was a prominent banker and mortgage broker in Lawrence, Kansas and would remain there, with Ballard, then the manager of the West Coast Improvement Company and the namesake of the recently established city of Ballard, serving as acting manager. The bank opened one year later in temporary quarters on Yesler Way in the Sanderson Block (The current location of the Merchant's Cafe) with plans to locate in the Burke Building at Second Avenue and Marion Street upon its completion. The bank soon decided to have their own building built instead, with several shareholders headed by Ballard and Luther H. Griffith (no-relation to the bank president) forming the Seattle National Bank Building Company in April 1890 in order to keep the bank's finances separate from the building. It also allowed them to issue bonds to Griffith's own firm, the Western Farm Mortgage Trust Company, that they would pay back with interest for the building's construction without causing a conflict of interest. During this time they purchased the lot for their new building from Fred E. Sander, who still held an option on the now vacant property and had put it up for sale that February advertising it as the finest business lot in the city. The same month the building company was formed they solicited for designs for a proposed 6-story building of brick, iron and stone, receiving plans from a dozen different architects. They ultimately chose the plans of then 28 year old John B. Parkinson, a relative newcomer to Seattle, who had recently dissolved his partnership with Cecil Evers with whom he had designed the Butler and Epler Blocks. The proposed bank and office building was estimated to cost about $200,000, the equivalent of nearly $6 million today.

Construction of the massive foundation, said to be one of the largest being built in the city at the time, began in June 1890 with the driving of piles, with large shipments of Chuckanut Sandstone arriving by barge from the Roth & Roeder quarry in Bellingham the following month. Early reports indicated that the building's lower floors were to be faced in Tenino bluestone but this was ultimately only used for the pier bases on the ground floor. The rest of the first and second floors were to be trimmed with red Colorado sandstone from the Kenmuir quarry near Colorado Springs, the site of which is now part of the Red Rock Canyon Open Space. The use of the stone was a novelty in Seattle at the time as local grey stone was so abundant and it would guarantee that the new building would stand out amongst its peers. The remainder of the street-facing façade was to be clad in high quality pressed brick from California and trimmed with red terracotta that would match the hue of the stone, giving the building a mostly monochromatic appearance. While most of the common brick and structural lumber used in the building was from Seattle, (Note: The lumber used in the structure was provided by the Stimson Mill in Ballard.)

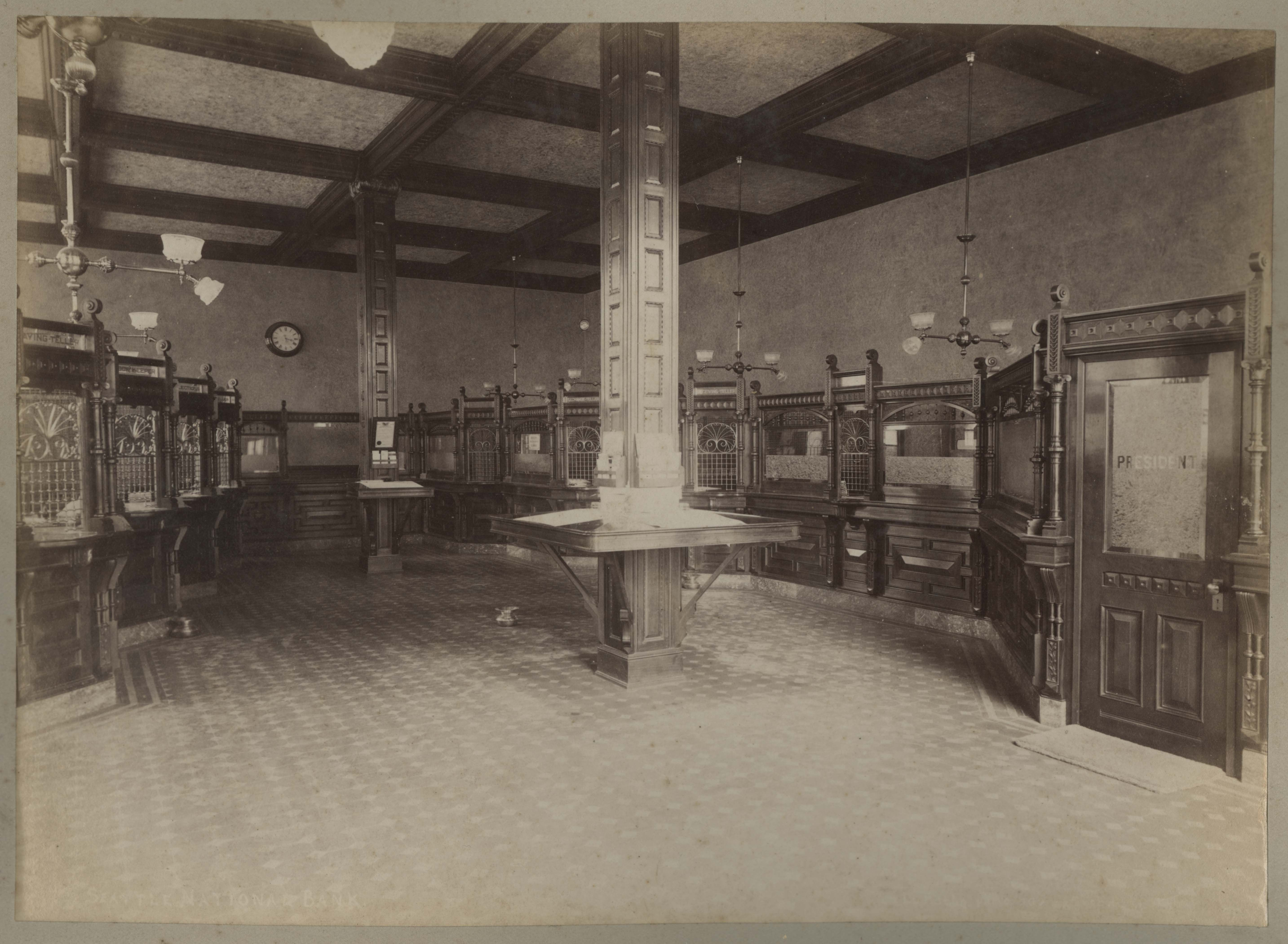
Inside the Seattle National Bank, shortly after opening.

many of its interior finishes and hardware were sourced from across the country; Smith & Wyman of Minneapolis supplied the doors, blinds, sashes and interior moldings. Matthew Dow was awarded the general construction contract, the first of many buildings he would help build in Seattle, (Note: Dow, brother of another prominent Seattle builder David Dow, would go on to build some of the first commercial buildings in Skagway and Dyea, Alaska, the current Colman Building, the original Colman Dock, the 1st Regiment Armory, and would later serve as a mayor of Ballard.) and by September, the walls were up to the second story.

Though completion of the building was still several months out in February 1891, the banking room, said to be the largest yet opened in Seattle, was made separately waterproof and the bank opened there that month, followed by the neighboring Seattle Savings Bank (later the Nickle then Washington Savings Bank) that June, which was connected to the National bank through common shareholders. The unfinished building was already being praised as one of the most magnificent bank buildings on the coast and would make appearances in many Architectural trade journals. A detailed description of the banking room was published in the Seattle Post-Intelligencer shortly before the bank's opening:

The fixtures, which were made in Battle Creek, Mich., are of Cuban mahogany, and are as handsome as can be found anywhere. The floors are inlaid with tiling, and as you go into the door it is like going into a parlor. The different tellers are located on each side of the room, the patrons, or depositors, in the center. There are ten different departments, all facing each other, with beautiful openings for the tellers, like so many bay windows. The base of the counter is Tennessee marble and marble plates are at each opening or window for handing coin over. The wickets are of oxidized silver, and the top of the counter is enclosed with beveled French plate glass, the lower half chipped and the woodwork beautifully carved... The ceiling and walls are of bronze finish and the remainder of the woodwork of Spanish cedar.

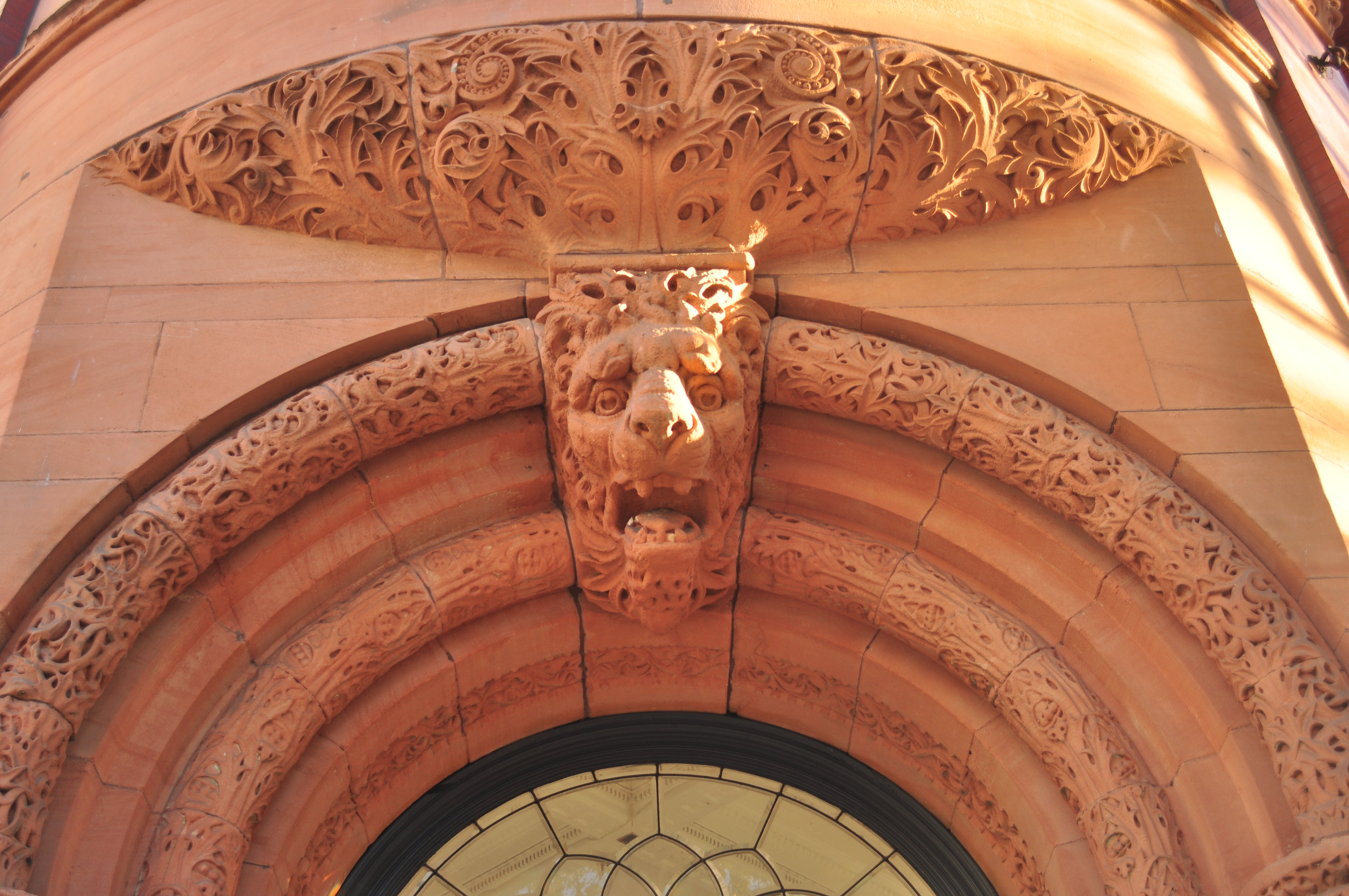
Stone carving, including the Lion's head keystone, above the original bank entrance

The building reached its 6th floor by March 1891 and most of the stone carving was complete including Bas-Relief gargoyles and a large lion's head keystone over the bank's corner entrance. Over 2,100,000 bricks had gone into the building's construction and the final brick was officially laid on April 9, 1891, though there was still at least 3 months of interior work left to be done before tenants could begin to fill the building's 150 office rooms, which were already fully rented out by this time.

The building was officially completed by September 1891 and tenants began to advertise the following month. Besides the banks, the ground floor was shared with a hardware store and a pawnbroker facing Occidental Way; the Monogram Saloon operated in the basement directly below the bank. The building's earliest upstairs tenants included dentists, brokers, realtors, art teachers and architect Parkinson's own office where he would remain until his removal to Los Angeles in 1894. Seattle's public night school opened on the building's second floor in 1892 with pupils in age ranging from 13 to 22, and was soon joined by the Queen City Business College and later the Acme Business College. The building became an early hub of charitable organizations, with the Union Gospel Mission opening in the basement and the Bureau of Associated Charities headquartered there in 1892. The Seattle Chamber of Commerce would locate in the building in 1893. One of Seattle's early telephone companies, the Seattle Automatic Telephone Company, would have their offices in the building until 1901.

The Seattle National Bank quickly became one of the wealthiest banks in the region, and within a year of opening had formed a network of banks in the Puget Sound region reaching as far as Port Townsend, Fairhaven and Pendleton, Oregon, each one managed with involvement from various employees of the home bank and Griffith's mortgage company. In some communities banks involved with the Seattle National would be the only to survive the Panic of 1893, proving their financial security. Things would not go so well for the bank's president and building owners though; in late 1890 Griffith resigned as president from his mortgage company, after butting heads with shareholders who were not agreeable to his Seattle projects and as a result payments from bonds issued to the building company became scarce and unpaid contractors and suppliers and even the architect soon came forward with liens against the building. The building company subsequently mortgaged the building to Griffith's former company in exchange for Promissory notes to quell their suppliers but these too went partially unpaid. Suspecting a personal grudge as a result of Griffith's involvement with them, the building company in turn joined numerous other firms in a lawsuit against the mortgage company in February 1892. Later that year Griffith resigned as bank president and in 1894 sued the ailing Seattle National Bank Building Company which after spending much of the previous year in court with various lawsuits was ordered into receivership with D.A. Spencer as receiver. The building was subsequently foreclosed upon and sold at auction for only $103,000; the bondholders wouldn't see a penny from the sale.

With an almost complete turnover in management by 1895, the Seattle National Bank had left their building, relocating to the Haller Building at Second Avenue and Columbia Streets in what is still today Seattle's financial district. With ownership of the building in limbo new bank president E.W. Andrews placed the building in the hands of attorney James Clise, who was tasked with shopping it around to his numerous wealthy clients in New York.

=== L.C. Smith and The Pacific Block ===
In December 1898 the Seattle National Bank Building was bought for $152,000 by Syracuse, New York banker and industrialist Lyman Cornelius Smith who, through his agent/attorney James Clise had amassed a large portfolio of Seattle buildings and land that he and his heirs would improve over the next decade culminating with the construction of the Smith Tower. Smith insisted on owning both building and the land whose title was owned at the time by Harold A. Preston in trust of the late H.A.P. Carter, one of the original trustees of the building company that purchased the land for its construction. In a suit that made it as far as the superior court, beneficiaries of Carter's trust including several large hardware and paint firms that had placed liens against the former building company as well as the Seattle National Bank itself came forward compelling Preston to sell below his asking price, eventually settling out of court. The building was officially rechristened as the Pacific Block in July 1899 to avoid confusion with the bank that hadn't been located there for several years. The banking room was initially converted into the offices of the North American Transportation & Trading Co., a steamship company and later for the local agents of the Chicago, Milwaukee, St. Paul and Pacific Railroad and New York Central Railroad.

The Fraternal Order of Eagles, established in Seattle in 1898, opened their first permanent lodge (Aerie No. 1) in the top floor of Pacific Block in 1899 and would host a variety of other fraternal clubs in their hall including the Foresters of America, the Improved Order of Red Men and the Tribe of Ben-Hur. In 1900 James Clise moved the offices of his investment company into the building's 5th floor where he managed all of L.C. Smith's other properties in the city. Other tenants during this time included William Nottingham's Globe Navigation Company, various importers and exporters, mining brokers relating to the Klondike Gold Rush, and a high concentration of architects including Thomas G. Bird, Cutter & Malmgren, Henderson Ryan, P.J. Donohue, James Donnellan and Francis Barton. The Globe Navigation Company and James Clise would move their offices into the newly completed Globe Building at First and Madison Streets by the end of 1901 followed by the Seattle Savings Bank. Clise's vacancy would be filled in 1902 by W.E. Granger who chose Seattle as the headquarters for his newly established Trans-Alaskan Railroad Company that was engaged in the race to build a railway connecting Iliamna Bay to the Bering Strait. He would use Seattle as a base for shipping construction materials to Alaska.

The building was visited by fire several times in the early 1900s, but its proximity to the fire department headquarters and the fact that numerous tenants were using their offices in the building as living quarters allowed for quick detection and minimal damage.

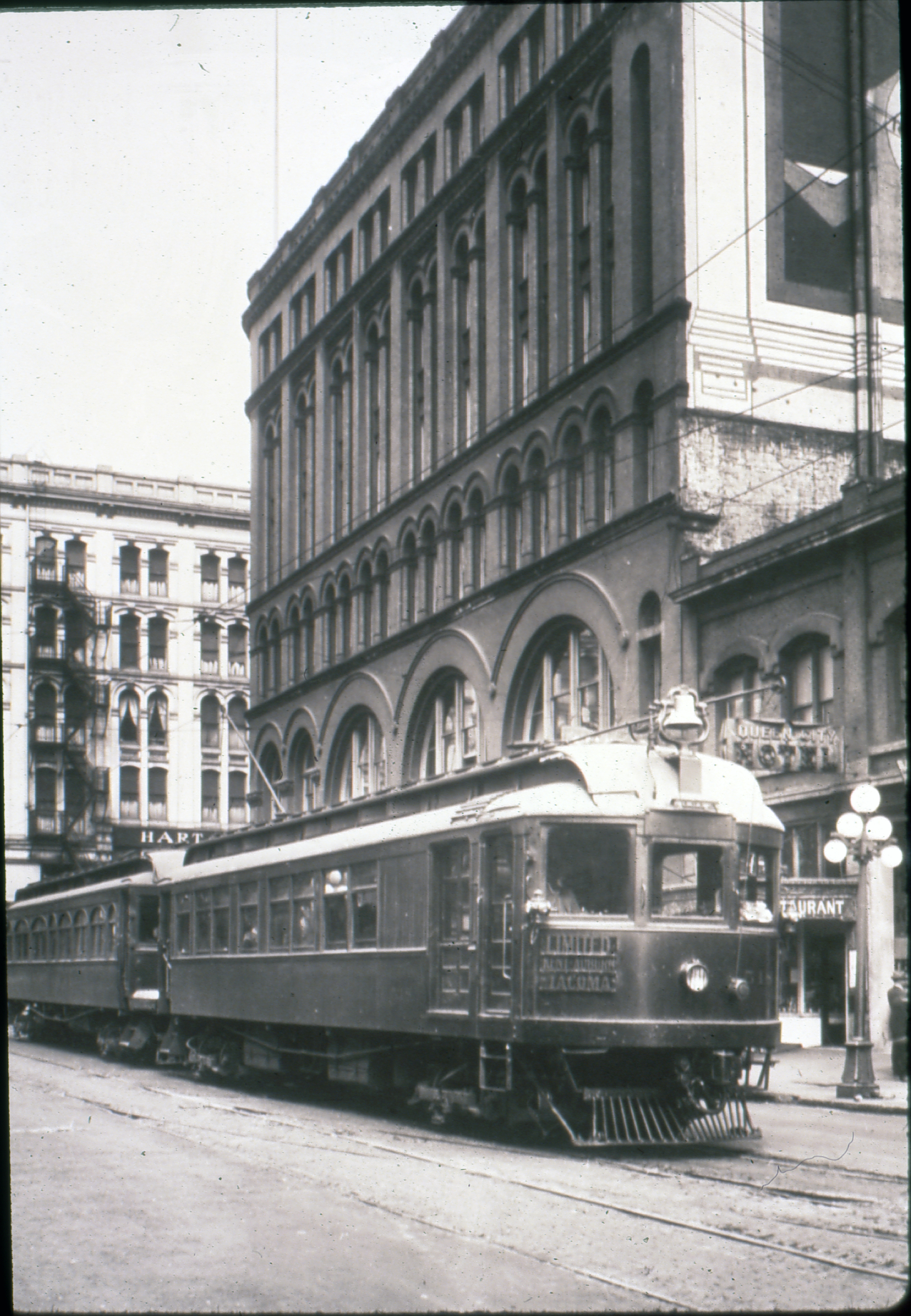
The interurban parked in front of the Pacific Block, circa 1920s

In February 1904 the old banking room was taken over by the Puget Sound Electric Railway for use as a ticket office and waiting room for the Seattle–Tacoma interurban line, which once again linked the building to developer Fred E. Sander who not only co-founded the railroad but had been responsible for purchasing most of the right of way. Originally located at the Southwest corner of First Avenue and Jackson Streets, the railway began looking for a new depot location when the Schwabacher Brothers decided to redevelop the lot. The railroad tracks, which originally ran up First Avenue to Yesler Way, were soon reconfigured into a loop that would pass in front of the Pacific Block before returning to First. At its peak the station had 27 daily departures for both Tacoma and the branch line to Renton.

Upon Smith's passing in 1910, his properties were willed to his widow Flora B. Smith, and upon her death in 1920 to their son Burns Lyman Smith (1880–1941) who would subsequently form the United Business Corporation as a holding company for all his Washington properties. Still residing in Syracuse, New York, he would later make Seattle his permanent home.

In the early 1910s, the 6th floor of the Pacific Block became the construction headquarters for the nearby Smith Tower, containing the offices of supervising architect H.W. Thompson and contractor the Whitney-Steen Company. Construction of the Smith Tower had barely reached ground level when B.L. Smith announced plans to demolish the Pacific Block and replace it with a building equal in height to the Smith Tower. Dubbed the B.L. Smith Building, construction would have begun as soon as the Smith Tower was completed but little else was mentioned of this project after the initial announcement.

=== The Smith Tower Annex ===
In the mid 1920s, the 2nd Avenue Extension project had stirred a brief revival in Pioneer Square real estate and despite the loss of foot traffic that the interurban had generated for the area, (Note: The Union Hardware Company at 106 Occidental, one of the building's oldest retail tenants, cited the closure of the interurban and subsequent loss of property value as their reason for relocating uptown.) the Pacific Block remained a popular office address as other nearby office buildings were converted to hotels or fell vacant. In August 1926 B.L. Smith revived the idea of replacing the Pacific Block, this time with a $2 million 18-story skyscraper. Smith said about the neighborhood at the time:

Extension of Second Avenue South to Seattle Boulevard, which is now being ordered by the City Council, will greatly benefit the present financial and retail district of the city, and I believe the time is near when First Avenue will be similarly connected through the south in a direct line.

His proposed building, tentatively titled the New Pacific Block, would contain a parking garage on the first 3 floors that would serve the offices above as well as the nearby Smith Tower. No further mention was ever made of this tower (or a First Avenue extension) and the plans were quietly scaled back to a refurbishment of the existing Pacific Block.

Shortly after the closure of the Puget Sound Electric Railway a $100,000 interior modernization of the Pacific Block was begun by B.L. Smith in October 1929 under the direction of architect Frank H. Fowler. A $400,000 mortgage was placed on the Smith Tower to fund the project. The project included new interior finishes, wiring and elevators and the lowering of the ground floor to be level with the sidewalk. The most visible result of the renovation was the demolition of the building's entire southeastern corner down to the third floor, which was done in order to bring more light to the inner offices and to make room for the construction of a heating plant in its place. Echoing the original plans of the tower that could have replaced the building, the basement was converted into a parking garage which it is still used as today. Upon completion the building was renamed the Smith Tower Annex. At the same time what had been known previously as the L.C. Smith Building was officially renamed the Smith Tower.

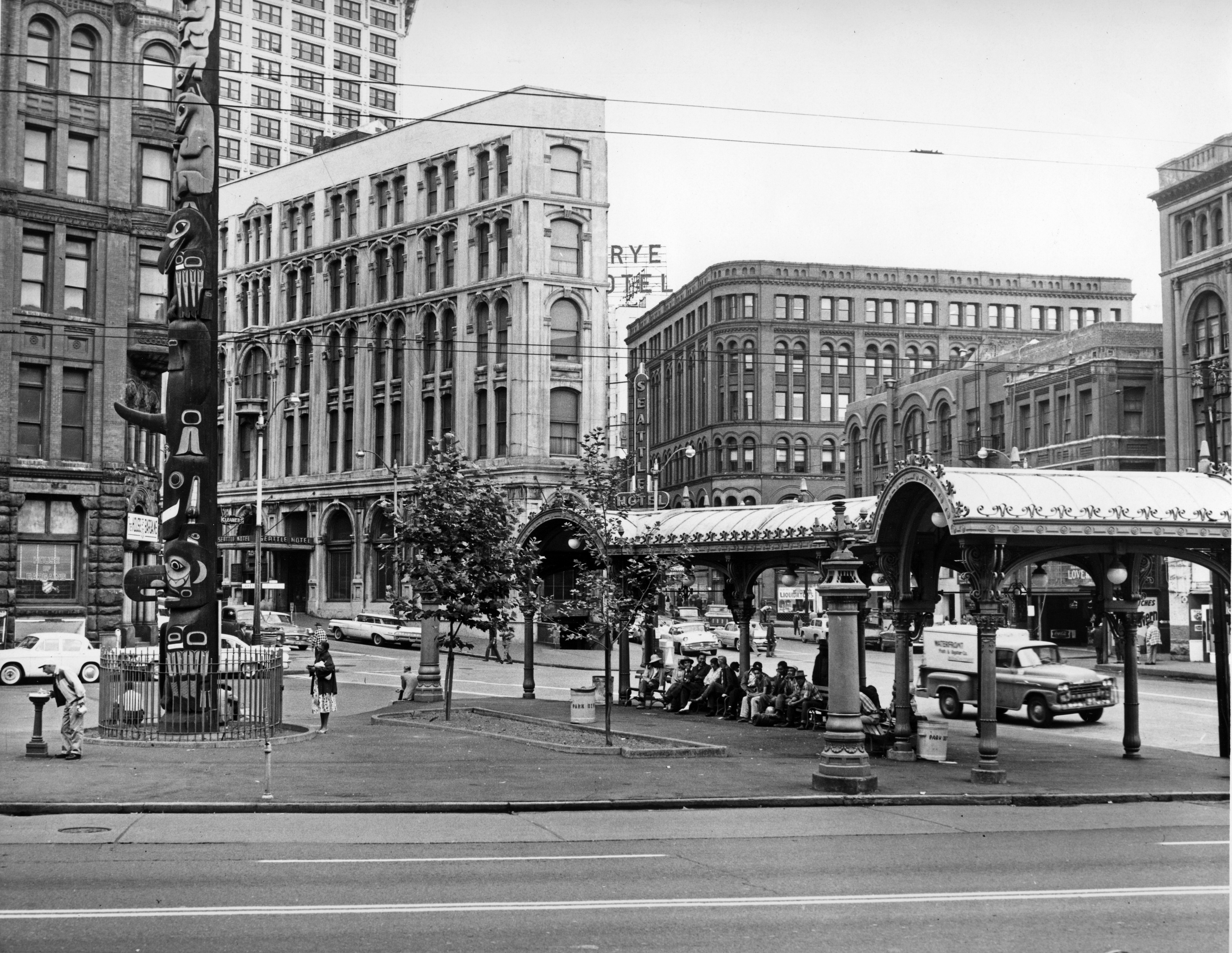
The Interurban Building in Pioneer Square, 1960

Following B.L. Smith's passing in 1941, the Smith Tower Annex remained in his estate until January 1945 when both it and the Smith Tower were offered to the city of Seattle for $75,000 and $900,000 respectively. The city floated the idea of converting the annex into a garage for city vehicles that would be connected to the Smith Tower by an underground tunnel, but they ultimately passed on buying the buildings. The building would eventually be purchased by realtor and developer Irving Baderman, who hired Henry Broderick, Inc. to manage it. From the end of World War II and into the early 1950s the building's upper floors were rented out by the U.S. Army, first to house the state offices of the Civil Aeronautics Authority and later the offices of the Seattle Port of Embarkation, their overseas supply division, air material office and the army and air force exchange services.

=== The Interurban Building ===
In the early 1970s the building, which had become mostly vacant and infested with pigeons under the previous owner, was purchased by architect and contractor George Filler and his wife Evelyn who undertook a multi-year $1.7 million project to upgrade the building's interior for modern office and retail tenants. (Note: Since the closure of the Interurban station, the former banking room-turned waiting room had been occupied briefly by a branch of Frye's meat market and for most of the 1940s by Block's Shoe Store, and appears to have remained vacant after that. The former savings bank space facing Yesler Way was occupied by various restaurants and pawn shops, as were the 3 storefronts facing Occidental Way.) During this time a faux vintage mural advertising Washington State Ferries was painted over a ghost sign for Sperry Flour on the building's south wall by Wallmarx as part of the "Seattle Walls" mural program, funded by the Downtown Seattle Development Association and the Seattle Arts Commission. Upon completion of renovations in 1977 the building was renamed the Interurban Building and once again became a prestigious office address for lawyers and agents.
