= City of Clinton =

City of Clinton may refer to:

- Clinton, Iowa
- Clinton, Mississippi
- Clinton, Oklahoma
- Clinton, Tennessee
- City of Clinton (steam ferry)
