= Suquamish (motor vessel) =

Diesel passenger ship built in 1914

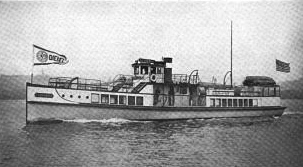
- Suquamish

History
- Name: Suquamish
- Owner: Kitsap County Transportation Co., Puget Sound Navigation Co. and others
- Builder: John Wilson
- Cost: $24,704
- In service: 1914
- Identification: US registry #212165

General characteristics
- Type: inland motor vessel
- Tonnage: 75 gross; 51 registered tons
- Length: 84.5 ft (25.76 m)
- Beam: 14.9 ft (4.54 m)
- Draft: 5 ft (1.52 m)
- Depth: 7 ft (2.13 m) depth of hold
- Installed power: diesel engine
- Propulsion: propeller
- Speed: 14 miles per hour
- Capacity: As built: 180 passengers
- Crew: five (5)

Suquamish, built in 1914, was the first diesel-engined passenger vessel in the United States. Much later Suquamish was converted to a commercial fishing vessel and was registered as a Canadian vessel under the name Terry.

== Nomenclature ==
Suquamish was named after the town of Suquamish, which in turn was named after the Suquamish tribe, whose most famous member was Chief Seattle. Suquamish was also known as “Hyak's pup”, after a much larger steamboat of the Kitsap County Navigation Company.

== Design and construction ==
Suquamish was designed by Lee and Brinton and built at the John Wilson shipyard in Seattle. Suquamish was of all wooden construction, 84.5 feet (25.8 m) long, 14.9 feet (4.5 m) beam, 7-foot (2.1 m) depth of hold, a 5-foot (1.5 m) draft, 75 gross tons and 51 registered tons. Suquamish cost $24,704 to construct.

The vessel carried 180 passengers. In 1922 Suquamish was reported as requiring a crew of five. As built, propulsion was provided by a 180-horsepower Nelseco four-cycle, six-cylinder, vertical single-acting diesel engine, built by the New London Ship & Engine Building Company, of Groton, Connecticut. The engine ran at 350 revolutions per minute, giving the vessel a speed of 14 miles per hour. The cost for fuel and lubricating oil averaged only 24 cents per hour. Suquamish carried a supply of fuel oil for two weeks, although there was space for a month's supply. Only one man was required for handling the engine, although, because the vessel was in operation from 6 am to 8 pm., two engineers were required to stand alternate watches.

== Ceremonial launching ==
Aware of the significance of the name, Warren L. Gazzam (1864–1861), president of the Kitsap County Transportation Company invited members of the Suquamish nation as well as pioneer settlers to the launching on April 28, 1914, which included an address in Chinook Jargon. The vessel was christened by Blanche Thompson, a great-great-granddaughter of Chief Seattle.

== Career ==
Suquamish was built for and originally owned by the Kitsap County Transportation Company (“KCTC”), which operated the vessel between Pier 3, Seattle (now Pier 54) and Poulsbo, Washington, making three round trips a day, with 14 landings on each trip. These 42 daily landings tested the endurance of the boat, as the clutch and reverse gears were constantly in use at these landings and the vessel was worked many times under the strain of a spring line tied to the wharves. In 1915, it was reported that Suquamish was satisfactory and economical as compared with the steam-driven KCTC vessels.

The vessel was re-engined in 1922 with 125 horsepower Gulowsen-Grei diesel. In 1923, KCTC had Suquamish on the Fletcher-Bay-Brownsville-Manzanita route.

In 1930, the Puget Sound Navigation Company (“PSN”), the dominant passenger and ferry concern on Puget Sound, secured a mail contract for the San Juan Islands. PSN put the steamers Monticello and Mohawk on the route, but there wasn't enough business to sustain two steamers of their size, and so PSN secured the use of Suquamish from KCTC. Suquamish was placed on a route running from Bellingham to San Juan Island, where it made a connection with Mohawk. Suquamish was also used on holiday excursions. The mail contract expired in December 1930, and Suquamish was returned to KCTC.

Suquamish was out of service and idle from about 1931 to 1938. In 1935, PSN acquired KCTC and the entire KCTC fleet, including Suquamish. PSN sold Suquamish to the Lake Washington Shipyard, which in turn, in late 1938, sold Suquamish to R.G. Gibson. Suquamish was re-powered and used as a charter vessel. After some ownership changes, Suquamish ended up working as a commercial fishing vessel in Canada under the name Terry.

At one point a surplus submarine diesel engine was installed in Suquamish.
