= Harper-Colby-Manchester route =

Shipping route originating from Seattle, U.S.

Harper-Colby-Manchester
- Waterway: Puget Sound
- Transit type: Steamboat and motor vessel
- Operator: Kitsap County Transportation Company

The Harper-Colby-Manchester route was a shipping route that originated from Seattle, Washington. The route included stops at Colby, Suquamish, and Manchester, Washington. As of January 1, 1917, the Kitsap County Transportation Company was operating steamboats on the route.
