= City of Clinton (steam ferry) =

1922 steamboat in United States

History
- Name: City of Clinton
- Owner: King County
- Operator: Kitsap County Transportation Co.
- In service: 1922
- Out of service: 1929
- Fate: Destroyed by fire

General characteristics
- Type: Steam ferry
- Tonnage: 57
- Length: 58 ft (17.68 m)
- Beam: 20 ft (6.10 m)
- Installed power: Steam engine, 100 hp (75 kW)
- Propulsion: Propeller

City of Clinton was a small steam ferry built in 1922 which served on Puget Sound until March 23, 1929, when the vessel caught fire and sank near the city of Mukilteo, Washington, USA.

== Career ==
City Of Clinton was built at Clinton, Washington, and was intended to run between that city and Everett, Washington. King County at that time owned and operated a number of ferries. King County ferries running between Seattle and Vashon Island, including City of Clinton, were turned over for operation and management to the Kitsap County Transportation Company.

On March 23, 1929, the ferry caught fire while underway near Mukilteo and sank.
