= Hoge Building =

Historic building in Seattle, Washington

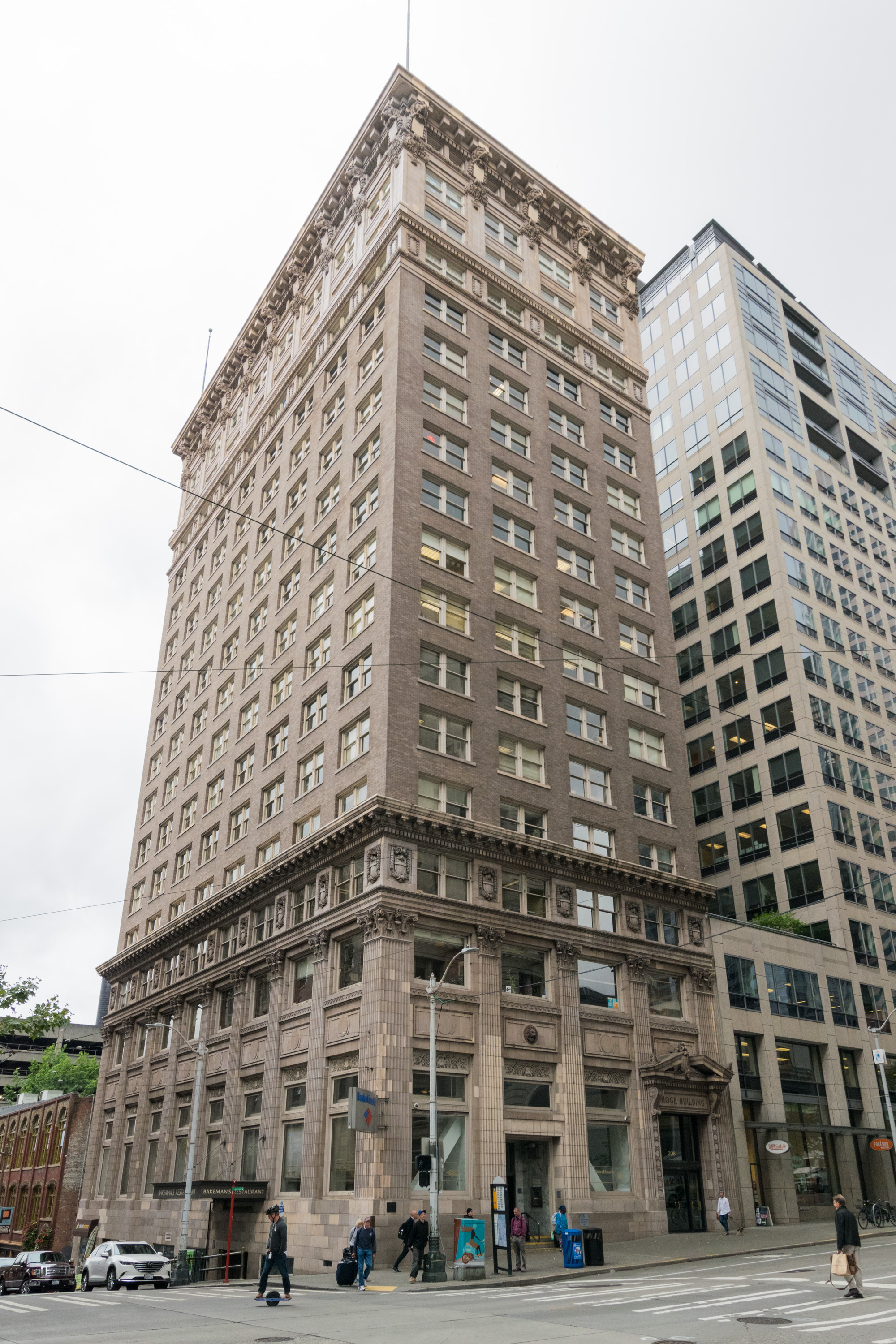

- Location within Downtown Seattle

Record height
- Tallest in Seattle from 1911 to 1914^{[I]}
- Preceded by: Alaska Building
- Surpassed by: Smith Tower

General information
- Location: 705 Second Avenue; Seattle, Washington
- Named for: James D. Hoge, Jr.
- Construction started: 1909
- Completed: 1911
- Renovated: 1992

Height
- Roof: 205 feet (62 m)

Technical details
- Floor count: 17

Design and construction
- Architects: Bebb & Mendel
- Hoge Building
- U.S. National Register of Historic Places
- Seattle Landmark
- Location: Seattle, Washington
- Coordinates: 47°36′10.79″N 122°20′1.10″W
- Built: 1911
- Architect: Bebb & Mendel
- Architectural style: Beaux-Arts
- NRHP reference No.: 83003339

Significant dates
- Added to NRHP: April 14, 1983
- Designated SEATL: September 10, 1984

The Hoge Building is a 17-story building constructed in 1911 by, and named for James D. Hoge, a banker and real estate investor, on the northwest corner of Second Avenue and Cherry Street in Seattle, Washington. The building was constructed primarily of tan brick and terracotta built over a steel frame in the architectural style of Second Renaissance Revival with elements of Beaux Arts. It was the tallest building in Seattle from 1911 to 1914, until the completion of Smith Tower.

== History ==
The site of the Hoge building, at 705 Second Avenue, was the location of the cabin of Carson Boren, reputedly the first white man's house in what was to become Seattle. The cabin was later replaced by a row of 1 and 2 story shops facing Cherry Street which would all be destroyed by the Great Seattle fire. Hoge's uncle, John Hoge, a wealthy businessman of Zanesville, Ohio purchased the site soon after the fire and erected a three-story brick building to house his company: Washington Territorial Investment Company, The Seattle Post-Intelligencer, Washington National Bank, and several other small businesses. Hoge would form Union Trust & Savings Bank (later renamed Seattle Trust Bank and merged with Seafirst Bank) in 1903 which would become the ground-floor tenant of his new building.

Hoge commissioned the architectural firm of Charles Bebb and Louis Mendel to design the building. Construction began in March 1911. The steel frame of the building was constructed at an amazing pace, with all 18 stories completed in 30 days, a feat which broke all records at the time. Reportedly, the building was designed with special concern by the architects for seismic events as a result of the 1906 San Francisco earthquake.

One of the last branches of Dexter Horton Bank was housed in the building in 1991 after being moved from its own building. The ground floor previously contained a Bank of America branch but as of January 2020, the commercial space is vacant. The building was owned by the Hoge family until being sold in 1986.

== See also ==
- Yule marble
