= Vincent Creek, Washington =

Vincent Creek
- Location of the mouth of the Vincent Creek in Washington

Location
- Country: United States
- State: Washington
- Counties: Kitsap

Physical characteristics
- Source: Vincent Lake
  - coordinates: 47°42′24″N 122°40′35″W
- Mouth: Big Scandia Creek
  - coordinates: 47°42′11″N 122°39′57″W

Basin features
- Tributaries
  - right: 2 - Levin Creek, Wilcox Creek

Vincent Creek is a tiny tributary of Big Scandia Creek. Its mouth is located on the western banks of Big Scandia Creek. It is unofficially named after Vincent Road Northwest.
