= Fletcher Bay–Brownsville–Manzanita route =

Shipping route originating from Seattle, U.S.

- Waterway: Puget Sound
- Transit type: Steamboat and motor vessel
- Operator: Kitsap County Transportation Company

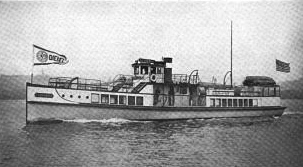
The Suquamish operated on the Fletcher Bay–Brownsville–Manzanita route.

The Fletcher Bay–Brownsville–Manzanita route was a shipping route that originated from Seattle, Washington. The route included stops at Fletcher Bay, Brownsville, and Manzanita.

As of January 1, 1917, the Kitsap County Transportation Company was operating steamboats on the route. The company also operated the motor vessel Suquamish on the route.
