= Port Madison-Suquamish-Poulsbo route =

Shipping route originating from Seattle, U.S.

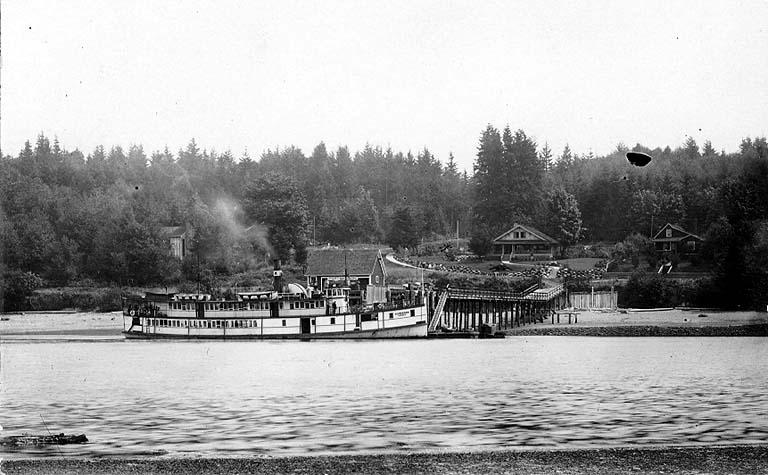
- Steamer Reliance at Port Madison circa 1914.
- Waterway: Puget Sound
- Transit type: Steamboat and motor vessel
- Operator: Kitsap County Trans. Co.

The Port Madison-Suquamish-Poulsbo route was a shipping route that originated from Seattle, Washington. The route included stops at Port Madison, Suquamish, and Poulsbo, Washington. As of January 1, 1917, the Kitsap County Transportation Company was operating steamboats on the route. The company also owned a dock at Suquamish and 2,200 feet of waterfront property at Port Madison.
