= Kitsap County Transportation Company =

Ferry company on Puget Sound, Washington, US

- Predecessor: Hansen Transportation Company
- Founded: Poulsbo, Washington, U.S. (1898)
- Area served: Puget Sound
- Key people: J.J. Hansen; A. Hostmark; Warren I. Gazzam; John L. Anderson

The Kitsap County Transportation Company was an important steamboat and ferry company that operated on Puget Sound. The company was founded in 1898 as the Hansen Transportation Company.

== Hansen Transportation ==
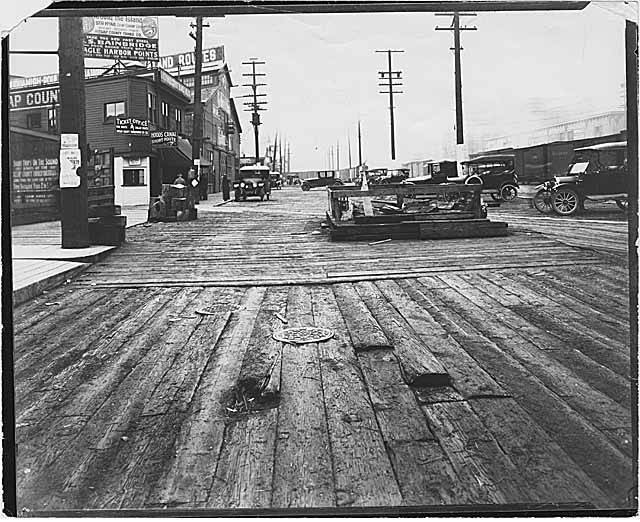
Kitsap County Transportation Company offices on Pier 3 (now Pier 54) in Seattle, circa 1910.

The Kitsap County Transportation Company grew out of a business known as the Hansen Transportation Company. The founder of Hansen Transportation was Capt John J. Hansen who moved to Tacoma from Minnesota in 1888. In Minnesota, and later in Boxton, North Dakota, J.J. Hansen had been in the business of selling farm equipment. John J. Hansen had two sons who joined him in the steamboat business, Captains Henry A. Hansen and Ole L. Hansen (1875–1940), as well as a son-in-law, Capt. Alf Hostmark. The business was formally organized in 1898, but started earlier. Hansen Transportation initially acquired the steamer Quickstep and put it on the mail route between Port Madison and Poulsbo. Business proved good, and the business was able to acquire the Hattie Hansen, trading the Quickstep for machinery to build another steamboat, the Sentinel. The Hansens then become involved in a rate war with the Moe Brothers who were running the steamer Reliance on the Dogfish Bay route in against the Hansens' Sentinel.

== Formation ==
The rate war was settled when Kitsap County businessman Warren I. "Colonel" Gazzam (b. 1863) bought Reliance. Gazzam also had some business allies acquire a major stake in the Hansen company. Gazzam arranged to have Reliance left on the Dogfish Bay route, while transferring Sentinel to a longer route, Harper – Colby – West Bainbridge Island – Brownsville. With Gazzam in charge as president, the company officially changed its name, in March 1905, to the Kitsap County Transportation Company. The company's official emblem as painted on the ships' smokestacks, was a white band (called a "collar") painted around the stack, with the letter "K" in black or red on each side. The company was capitalized at $200,000.

== Acquisitions ==
The Kitsap County Transportation Company acquired a number of steamboats, including Kitsap, Hyak, Burton, Falcon, Vashon II, Tolo, and Kitsap II.

In March 1905 KCTC bought Reliance for $20,000. In December 1906 the company purchased Burton for $11,225. In June 1909 the company bought Hyak, paying $51,101.72. In April 1914 the company purchased Suquamish for $23,807.73. In November 1915, KCTC bought Camano from the Capt. H.B. Lovejoy's Island Transportation Company for $15,000 and renamed the vessel Tolo.

Suquamish, sometimes referred to at the time as "Hyak's pup" was notable for being the first diesel-powered passenger vessel in the United States.

== Waterfront property ==
As of January 1, 1917, the company owned 2,200 feet (670 m) of waterfront property at Brownsville, Washington, valued for rate-paying purposes at $6,600, and a dock at Suquamish, valued at $1,800. In 1927, Kitsap County Transportation Company and Puget Sound Freight Lines (PSFL) formed a joint venture company called the Ferry Dock Company, which took out a long-term lease on the Grand Trunk Pacific dock in Seattle, which was then in a rundown condition. The dock became the main terminal and for both lines. In 1929, the stockholders of KCTC and PSFL reached agreement with Wilbur B. Foshay (b. 1887) to sell their companies, including the Ferry Dock Company, to Foshay, who was then assembling a utility and transportation business empire. Foshay however was financially ruined in the October 1929 stock market crash and the transaction never went through.

== Routes ==
As of January 1, 1917, the company operated on the following routes originating from Pier 3 (now Pier 54) in Seattle:

- Port Madison-Suquamish-Poulsbo;
- Harper-Colby-Manchester;
- YWCA-Rolling Bay, and
- Fletcher-Bay-Brownsville-Manzanita.
