= YWCA-Rolling Bay Route =

Shipping route originating from Seattle, U.S.

YWCA-Rolling Bay route
- Waterway: Puget Sound
- Transit type: Steamboat and motor vessel
- Operator: Kitsap County Transportation Company

The YWCA-Rolling Bay route was a shipping route that originated from Seattle, Washington. The route included stops on the east side of Bainbridge Island, Washington at the YWCA summer camp (a Boy Scout camp and a riding camp were also located nearby) and at Rolling Bay.

As of January 1, 1917, the Kitsap County Transportation Company was operating steamboats on the route.
