= Syracuse University College of Engineering and Computer Science =

School of engineering and computer science at Syracuse University

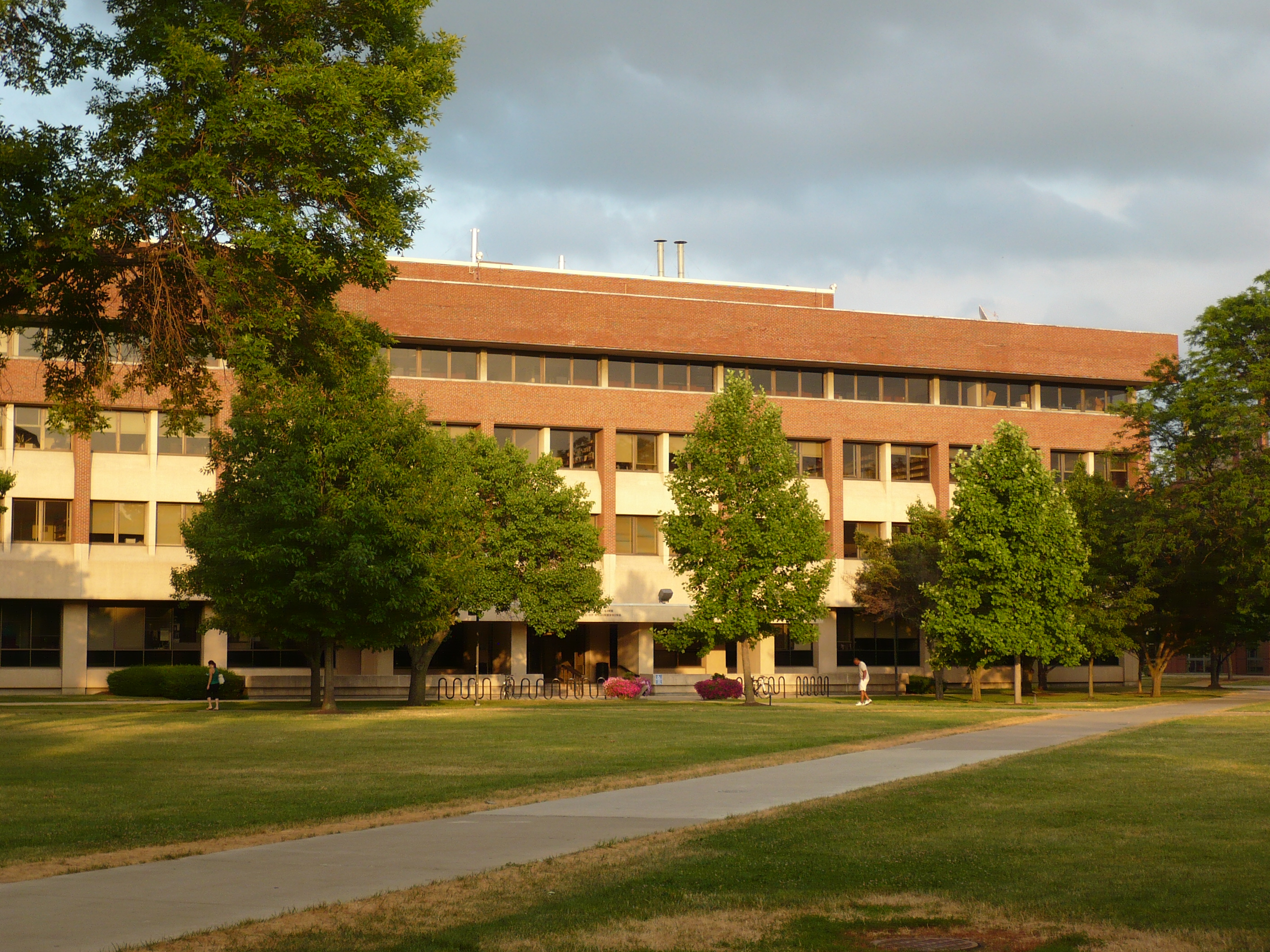
- Link Hall, home of the engineering school
- Type: Private
- Established: 1901; 125 years ago
- Parent institution: Syracuse University
- Dean: J. Cole Smith
- Academic staff: 128 (Fall 2016)
- Administrative staff: 75 (Fall 2016)
- Students: 2,624 (Fall 2016)
- Location: 223 Link Hall, Syracuse, NY, 13244, USA; 43.0376°N 76.1325°W
- Campus: Urban
- Website: eng-cs.syr.edu

The Syracuse University College of Engineering and Computer Science is one of the 13 schools and colleges of Syracuse University. The College offers more than 30 programs (bachelors, masters and PhD) in four departments – Biomedical and Chemical Engineering; Civil and Environmental Engineering; Electrical Engineering and Computer Science; and Mechanical and Aerospace Engineering and The College.

== History ==
The study of engineering at the Syracuse University can be traced back to 1877 when the University began training students in civil engineering. Electrical engineering and mechanical engineering courses were taught beginning in 1897 and 1900, respectively.

In 1900, Lyman Cornelius Smith, innovator and industrialist from Syracuse, donated nearly $750,000 to erect an engineering building. The building was designed by Syracuse architects Gaggin and Gaggin and was completed between 1900–1902. In the fall of 1901, the Lyman C. Smith College of Applied Science was established and formally occupied the eponymous Smith Hall.

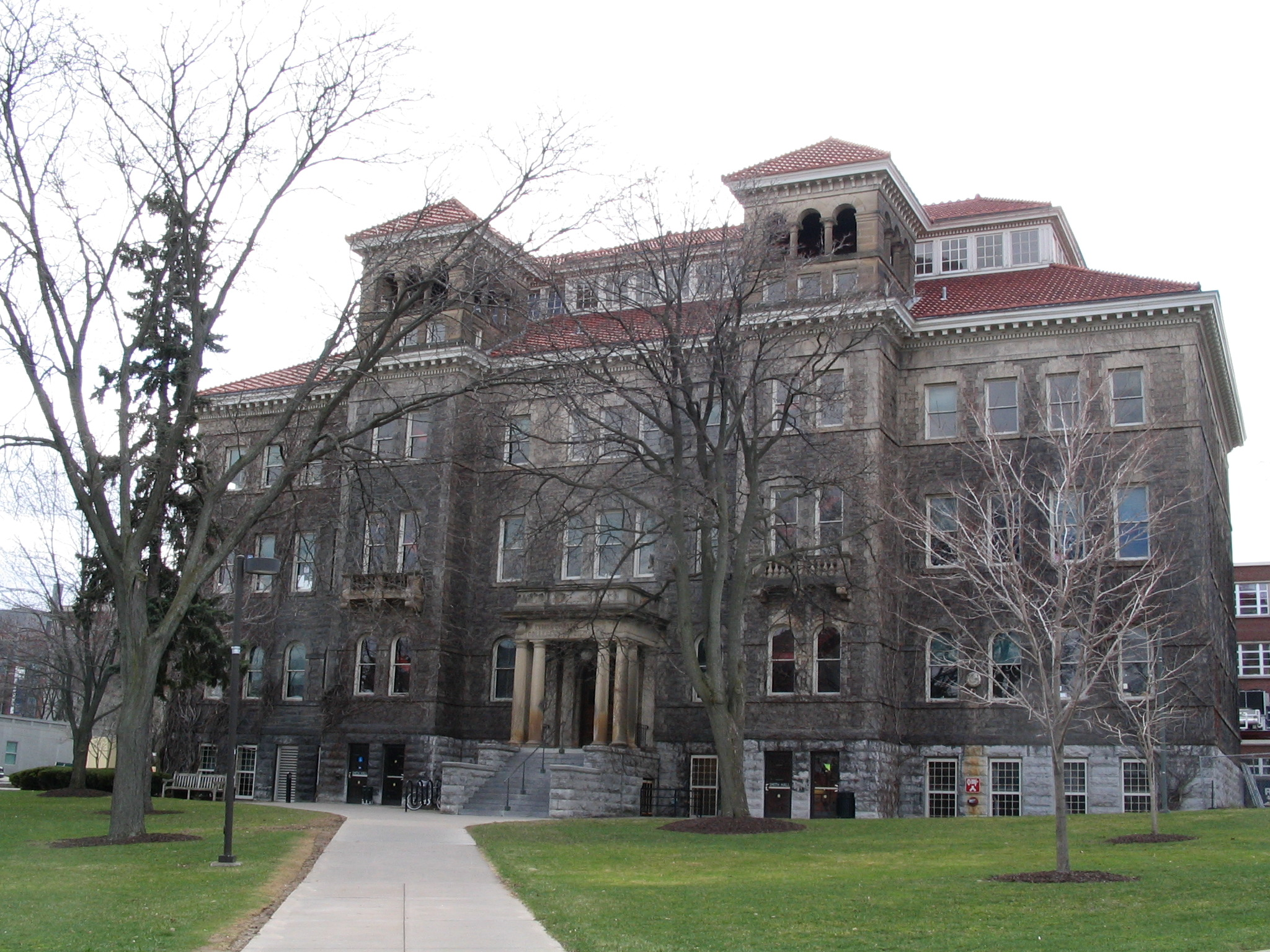
L.C. Smith Hall, Syracuse University

Between 1947 and 1952, the size of the university tripled due to the GI bulge and the department shifted at an expanded facility on Thompson road near the Syracuse Hancock Airport. The property was later sold to the Carrier Corporation and the proceeds were used to build new building on campus.

During the latter half of the 20th century the school continued to break new ground. In 1952, the name of the department was changed to L.C. Smith College of Engineering and it moved into then newly constructed Hinds Hall, then called Engineering building #1

In 1958, the Institute for Sensory Research was established by Jozef J. Zwislocki. The program later led to establishment of an undergraduate program in bioengineering in 1971.

In 1970, the department moved to the newly built Link hall. The building is named after Edwin Albert Link, inventor of flight simulator and the principle donor for the building. The $6 million building was dedicated in presence of Link and his family on October 16, 1970. It currently houses offices, classrooms and laboratories of the Syracuse University College of Engineering and Computer Science.

Syracuse offered degrees in computer engineering in 1971, becoming only the second institution in the country to do so. The School of Computer and Information Science, founded in 1976, later merged to form the College of Engineering and Computer Science.

In 2008, Link Hall was expanded with "Link+" addition on the north side of the building. It was designed by Toshiko Mori of the Harvard Graduate School of Design and constructed by JPW Companies of Syracuse. This addition added five stories of space to the research labs for both the engineering college and the Center of Excellence in Environmental and Engineering Systems.

== Academics ==
The college is organized into four departments:

- Biomedical and Chemical Engineering
- Civil and Environmental Engineering
- Electrical Engineering and Computer Science
- Mechanical and Aerospace Engineering

All Bachelor of Science degrees in Engineering at Syracuse University are accredited by the ABET. Bachelors in Aerospace Engineering, Bioengineering, Chemical Engineering, Civil Engineering, Computer Engineering, Computer Science, Cybersecurity, Electrical Engineering, Environmental Engineering, and Mechanical Engineering are offered. Masters programs are offered in Bioengineering, Engineering Management, Environmental Engineering, Environmental Engineering science, and Mechanical & Aerospace Engineering.

Engineering@Syracuse offers three online degrees in collaboration with 2U, Inc., including the Master of Science in Computer Engineering, Computer Science, and Cybersecurity.

PhD programs are offered in Bioengineering, Chemical Engineering, Civil Engineering, Computer/Information Science & Engineering, Electrical & Computer Engineering, Mechanical & Aerospace Engineering.

A joint Master of Public Health degree program and a joint PhD program in biomedical engineering are offered in collaboration with Upstate Medical University. The campus of Upstate Medical is also situated on University Hill neighborhood.

== Research ==
Syracuse University is a R1 research institution. In FY 2016, $12.44 million were awarded for sponsored research. Of this, $8.15 million came federal funding agencies and $3.1 million from New York State agencies, while foundations and nonprofits provided $0.5 million.

Faculty at SU’s School of Engineering and Applied Science have created several centers for advanced study including:

- Syracuse Biomaterials Institute (SBI, established 2007 with a central facility in Bowne Hall)
- Center for Advanced Systems and Engineering (CASE)
- Syracuse Industrial Assessment Center (IAC)
- The Bill and Penny Allyn Innovation Center, is a research innovation center situated in the southern portion of Link Hall.

The college has a strong research focus on the energy efficiency and air quality of indoor environments. Research centers and facilities include:

- Center of Excellence in Environmental and Energy Systems ( COE)
- Willis H. Carrier Total Indoor Environmental Quality Lab (TIEQ)
- Building Energy and Environmental Systems Laboratory (BEESL)
- Center for Environmental Systems in Engineering (CESE)
- The New York Environmental Quality Systems Center (NYEQS, established 2001).
- Honeywell Indoor Air Quality Laboratory (established 2021)

== Student activities ==
Invent@SU is a six-week invention program for undergraduate students to design, prototype and pitch product ideas.

The WISE program at Syracuse University supports undergraduate women in engineering and computer science fields amongst others.

== See also ==
- Syracuse iSchool
