= Big Scandia Creek =

- Location of the mouth of the Big Scandia Creek in Washington

Location
- Country: United States
- State: Washington
- Counties: Kitsap

Physical characteristics
- Source: Scandia Lake
  - coordinates: 47°43′50″N 122°41′35″W
- Mouth: Liberty Bay
  - coordinates: 47°43′09″N 122°39′23″W

Basin features
- Tributaries
  - left: 5 - Vincent Creek, Cox Creek, Luoto Creek, Beth Creek and Barkley Creek

Big Scandia Creek is a river in Scandia, Washington. It has a length of 1.62 kilometers including its watershed. It has been known to be a salmon spawning area, and is one of the major creeks in the watershed of Liberty Bay. Summer-time measurements in 2010 revealed a temperature of about 13.5°C and was slightly alkaline – 7.8 pH. The water is mostly shaded but shallow. As a result of Big Scandia Creek's narrow and shallow form, it usually has many rapids and falls along its route. Little Scandia Creek is Big Scandia's sister (or twin) river. Big Scandia Creek is also the dominating and largest river in Scandia. It is and has the largest route and watershed in the Liberty Bay Watershed aside from Dogfish Creek.
