= Lyman Cornelius Smith =

American engineer (1850–1910)

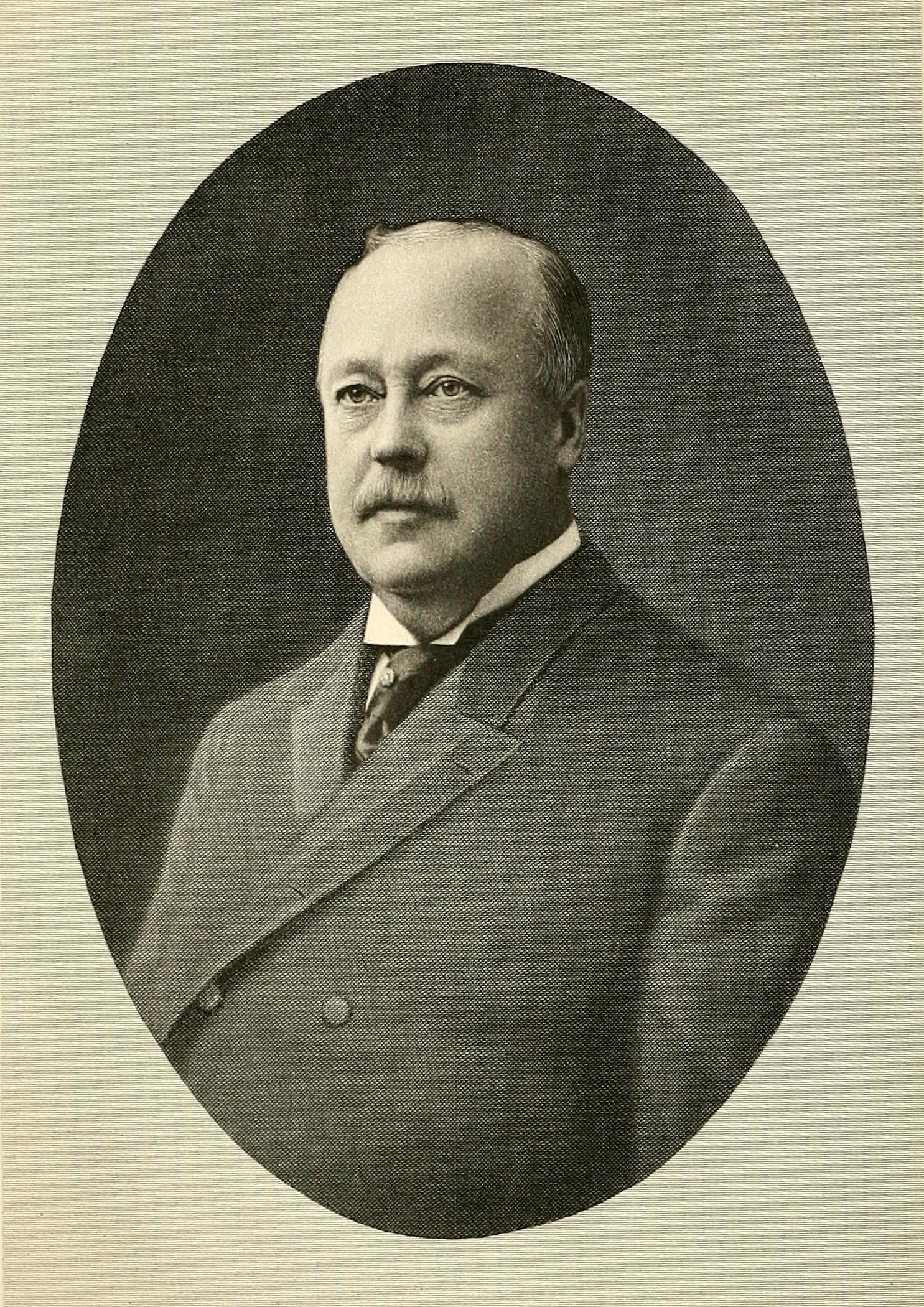
- Born: March 31, 1850; Torrington, Litchfield County, Connecticut, United States
- Died: November 5, 1910 (aged 60); Syracuse, Onondaga County, New York, United States
- Occupation: Industrialist
- Spouse: Flora Elizabeth Burns
- Children: Burns Lyman Smith and Flora Bernice Smith
- Parent(s): Lewis Stevens Smith and Eliza Ann Hurlbut Smith

Lyman Cornelius Smith (1850–1910) was an American innovator and industrialist. He is buried in a mausoleum in Oakwood Cemetery in Syracuse, New York.

== Early business ventures ==
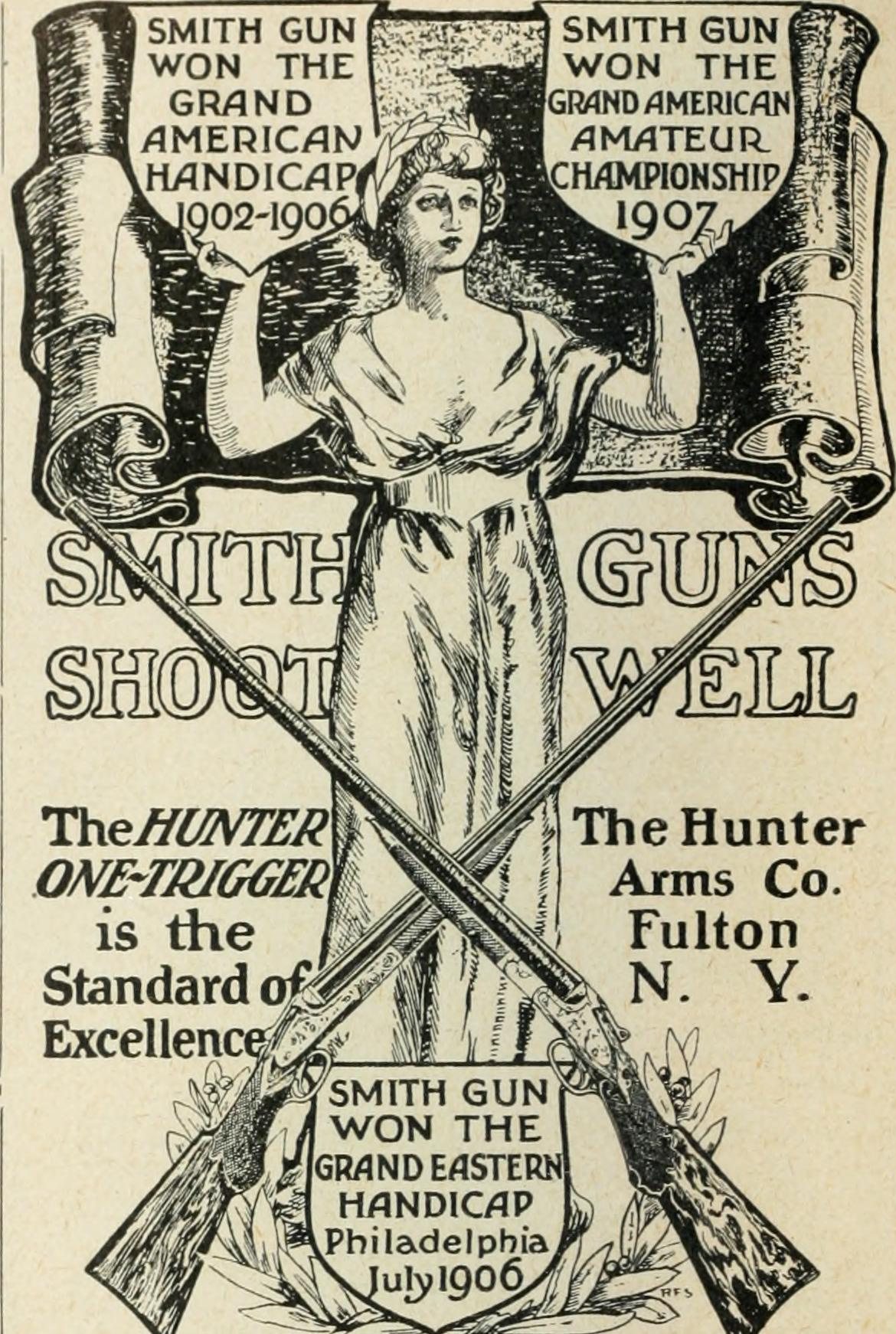
'Smith gun' advertisement

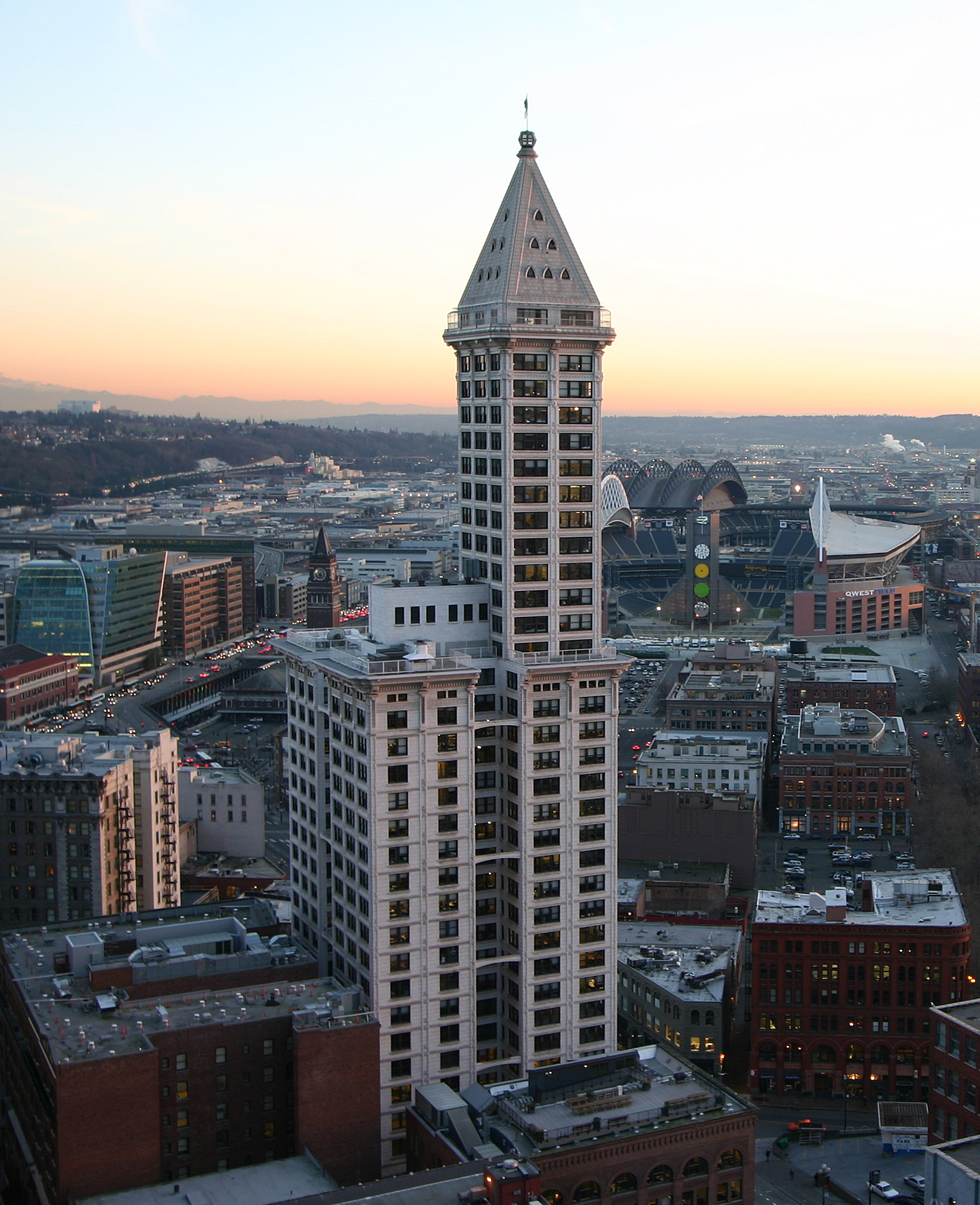
Smith Tower in Seattle

L.C. Smith's first business venture occurred in 1873, when he opened a livestock commission in New York City. The business failed within two years. Undeterred, Smith next attempted to establish a lumber business in Syracuse in 1875. His success in lumber was limited. Again on the verge of financial failure, Smith decided to enter into the lucrative business of producing firearms. Although he and members of his family manufactured guns, they are not the 'Smith' from Smith & Wesson. Instead, Lyman Smith was the namesake of the famous L.C. Smith Shotgun. In 1877, L.C. and his older brother Leroy joined forces with an established firearms designer, William H. Baker, to form W.H. Baker & Co., and for the next three years, the firm produced Baker designed shotguns. However, in 1880, Leroy Smith and W.H. Baker left the company, and founded Ithaca Gun Company. The defection of Leroy Smith and Baker from the company did not hamper business, as they were replaced by Smith's younger brother, Wilbert, and a new designer Alexander T. Brown. The company was renamed the L.C. Smith Shotgun Company of Syracuse and went on to produce several popular breech-loading shotguns. In 1886, the company produced its first hammerless shotgun. This proved to be their most successful design. Despite the success of the company, Smith decided to sell the manufacturing rights for the entire line of L.C. Smith shotguns to Hunter Arms Company in 1889. Hunter Arms would produce the line until 1945, when they sold it to Marlin Firearms Company. Marlin halted production of L.C. Smith shotguns in 1950. They briefly revived the brand in 1967, before retiring it for good in 1972.

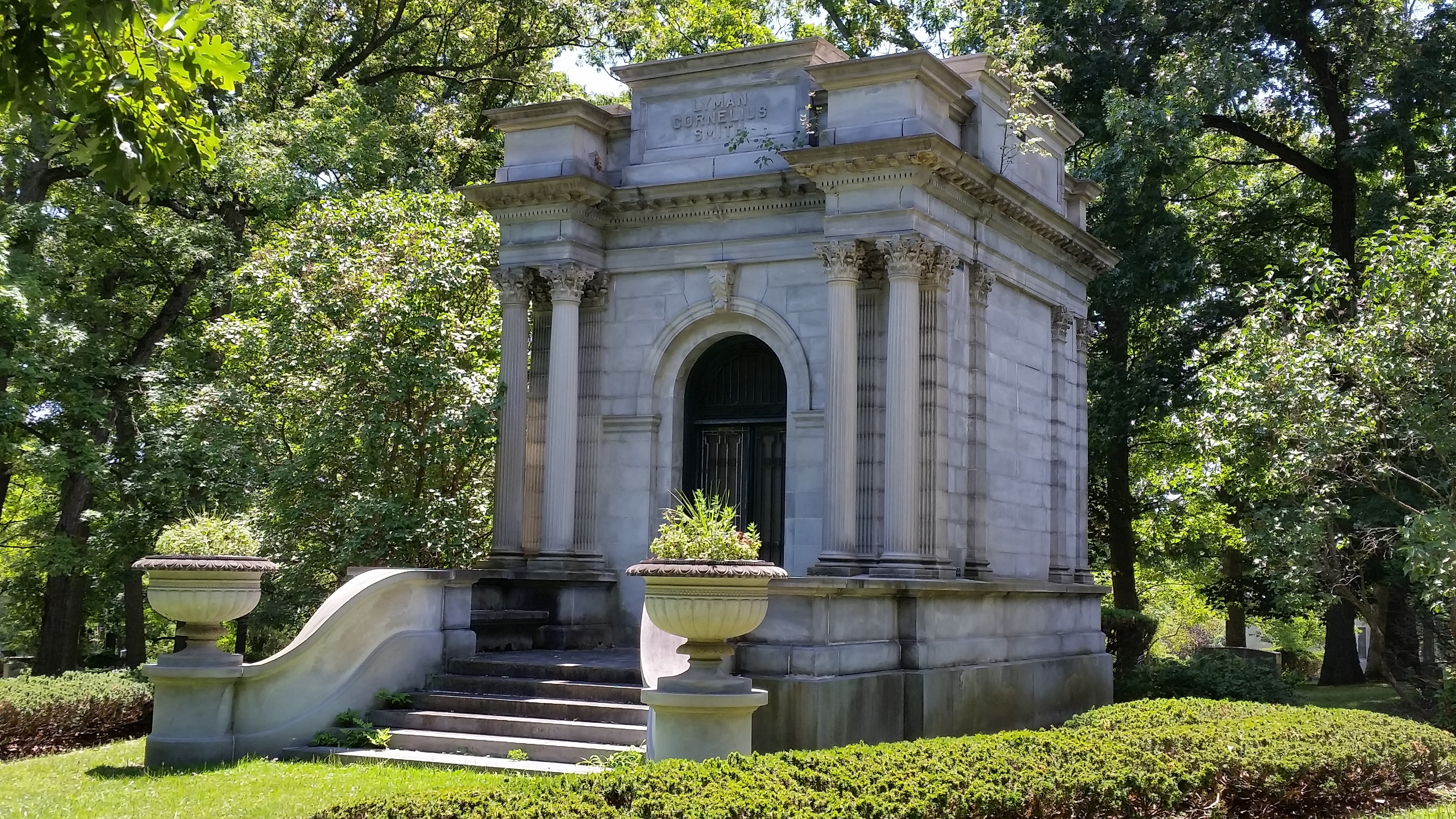
L.C. Smith memorial, Oakwood Cemetery, Syracuse, NY

== The Smith Corona Company ==
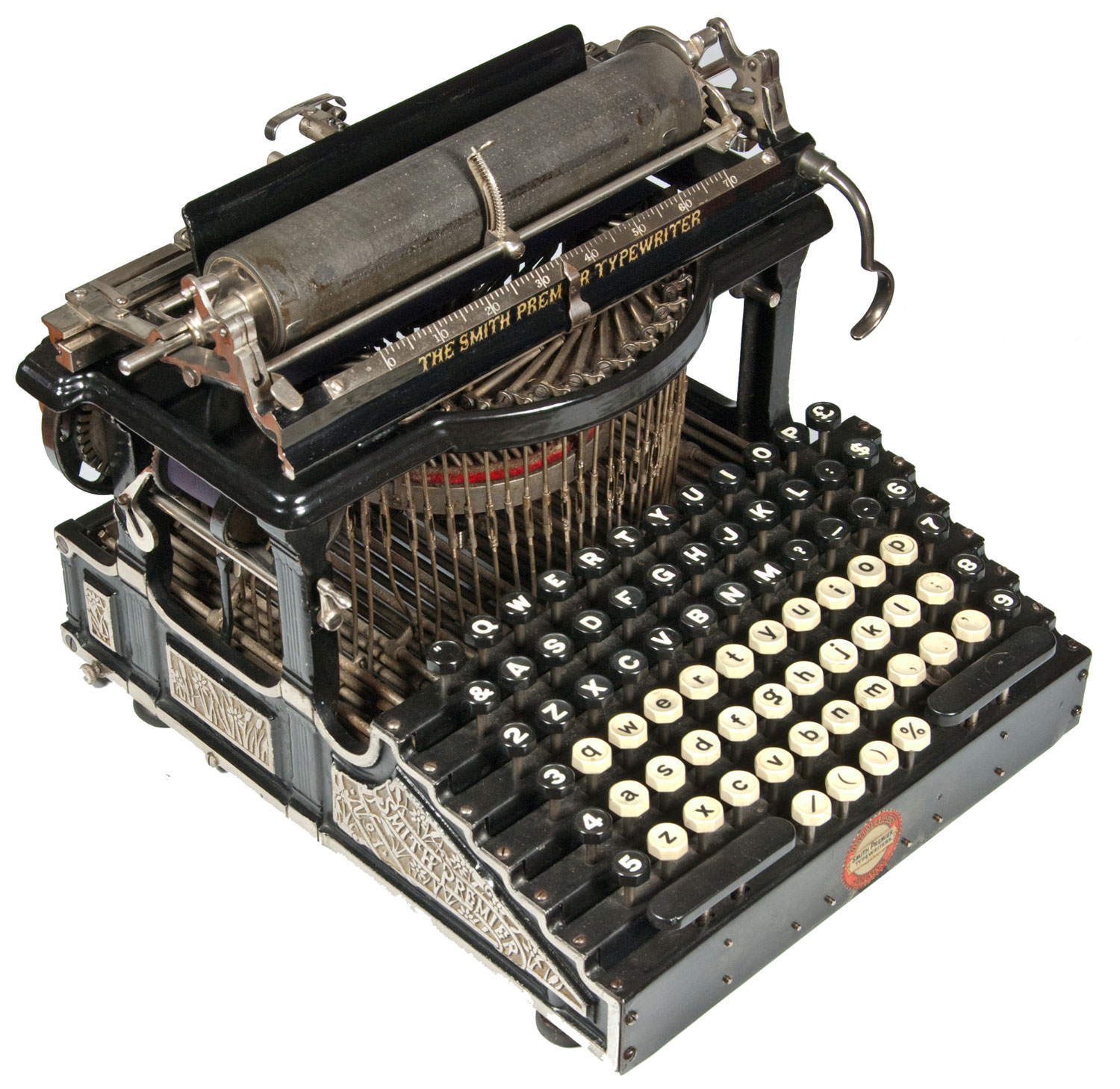
Smith Premier 1 typewriter, 1889

Smith later went on to found the Smith-Premier Typewriter Company, which would later become Smith-Corona Typewriter Company. Smith Corona or the SCM Corporation is a US typewriter and calculator company. The company experienced a decline in sales since the mid-1980s upon the introduction of PC-based word processing. Its competitors include Brother, Olivetti and IBM.

He was a presidential elector in the 1896 presidential election.

== Philanthropy ==
In 1900, Smith donated nearly $75,000 to erect an engineering building at Syracuse University, and the L.C. Smith College of Engineering and Computer Science at Syracuse was named after him. Smith was a major financial booster of Syracuse rowing.

He also funded the Smith Tower in Seattle, WA.
