= Scandia, Washington =

- Village
- Location in Washington and the United States Scandia (the United States)
- Coordinates: 47°42′59″N 122°39′29″W
- Country: United States
- State: Washington
- County: Kitsap
- Elevation: 176 ft (54 m)
- Time zone: UTC-8 (Pacific (PST))
  - Summer (DST): UTC-7 (PDT)
- ZIP Code: 98370
- GNIS feature ID: 1531543

Scandia is an agriculture-based village in Kitsap County, Washington, United States. Scandia is situated on the Kitsap Peninsula on the west bank of Liberty Bay, a few miles south of Poulsbo in the Scandia Valley.

Scandia is known for its agricultural landscape, which includes several farms, gardens, and pumpkin patches. Fertile soils enriched by local waterways, such as Big Scandia Creek, support the cultivation of a variety of crops. Notable agricultural operations in the community include Scandia Patch, Scandia Valley Farm, and Pam MacNeil's Scandia Farm and Garden.

== History ==
Scandia Valley was settled in the late 1800's by three immigrant brothers from Strömnäset, Medelpad, Sweden. By the beginning of the 1900s, the settlement had its own dock and store and was independent from the nearby city Poulsbo. At the time, there were several farms owned by local residents such as C. E. Lundquist, F. Lundquist, Carl E. Frykholm, Andrew Johnson, and Charles Nelson. The etymology of Scandia is derived from the Latin word for Scandinavia, which the area was named shortly after settlement.

== Geography ==
The topography of Scandia consists of gently rolling hills characteristic of the glacial landscape of Kitsap County's western uplands, with elevations generally ranging from near sea level along the bay to 300–600 feet inland. The average elevation in the vicinity is about 176 feet, though point measurements at the community's core register around 59 feet above sea level. Local streams, including Big Scandia Creek—a tributary draining into Liberty Bay—have carved fertile valleys that contribute to the area's agricultural suitability. These valleys are supported by post-glacial drainage patterns, with short streams flowing through narrow postglacial canyons toward Puget Sound.

Geologically, Scandia is underlain by Pleistocene deposits from the Vashon Drift, including a mantle of glacial till up to 60 feet thick overlying stratified sands, gravels, and clays such as the Kitsap clay member. This glacial till soil, derived from the advance of the Vashon glacier during the last ice age, forms a fertile substrate well-suited for farming, with the land surface shaped by ice-scoured terrain and subsequent outwash. The total land area encompasses roughly 358 acres (0.56 square miles), including a minor water component of 0.039 square miles associated with nearby creeks and bayfront.
