= Hyak (1909 steamboat) =

Wooden-hulled steamship, operated on Puget Sound

- Hyak

History

United States
- Name: Hyak
- Route: Puget Sound
- Completed: 1909, Portland, Oregon
- Out of service: 1941
- Fate: Abandoned.

General characteristics
- Tonnage: 195
- Length: 134 ft (40.8 m)
- Installed power: triple expansion steam engine
- Propulsion: propeller

Hyak was a wooden-hulled steamship that operated on Puget Sound from 1909 to 1941. This vessel should not be confused with the sternwheeler Hyak which ran on the extreme upper reach of the Columbia River at about the same time. The name means "swift" or "fast" in the Chinook Jargon.

== Career ==
Hyak was built at Portland, Oregon in 1909 at the shipyard of Joseph Supple for the Kitsap County Transportation Company. The vessel was 134 feet (40.8 m), rated at 195 tons, and was equipped with a triple expansion steam engine with cylinders 12, 18 and 32 inches in diameter with an 18-inch bore stroke on all cylinders. The engine worked on steam produced at 225 pounds of pressure, and generated 750 horsepower. Hyak was brought up from the Columbia River around the Olympic Peninsula by Capt. J.J. Reynolds. It was reported that during this trip the vessel was at times able to reach a speed of 20 miles per hour.

Hyak was placed on routes running from Seattle to Bainbridge Island and Poulsbo, serving Port Madison, Suquamish, Seabold, Keyport, Lemola, Scandia, and Pearson. The vessel was also used for excursions. Like many other Puget Sound steamers, Hyak used Pier 3 (now Pier 54) as its Seattle terminal. Hyak was one of the faster vessels on Puget Sound and was a favorite among passengers.

Hyak was one of the last of the wooden-hulled steamships of Puget Sound to operate in regular commercial service. From 1935 to 1938 Hyak was owned by the Puget Sound Navigation Company, then the dominant steamboat and ferry company on Puget Sound. In 1941, Hyak was abandoned on a mudflat on the Duwamish River.
