= Hyak (sternwheeler) =

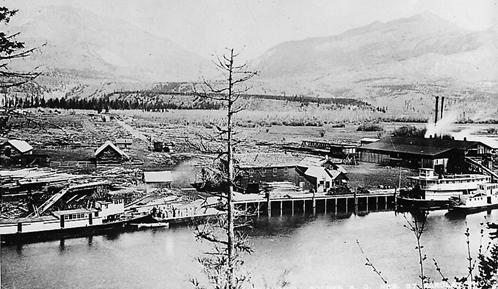
- Waterfront at Golden, British Columbia. Smaller steamer on left may be Hyak. Large steamer on right is probably Duchess

History

United States
- Name: Hyak (CAN #100687)
- Owner: Upper Columbia Navig. & Tramway Co.; Columbia River Lumber Co.
- Operator: Frank P. Armstrong
- Port of registry: Golden, BC
- Route: Inland British Columbia on the Columbia River in the Columbia Valley
- Launched: 1892 at Golden, BC
- Fate: Removed from service, 1906

General characteristics
- Type: Inland passenger/freighter
- Tonnage: 39 gross tons; 24.6 registered tons
- Length: 81 ft (25 m)
- Beam: 11.2 ft (3 m)
- Depth: 3.9 ft (1 m) depth of hold
- Installed power: twin steam engines, horizontally mounted, 6" bore by 24" stroke, 2.4 nominal horsepower, manufactured 1892 Jencks Machine Co., Sherbrooke, Que.
- Propulsion: sternwheel

Hyak was a sternwheel steamboat that operated in British Columbia on the Columbia River from 1892 to 1906. Hyak should not be confused with the Puget Sound propeller-driven steamboat also named Hyak. The name means "swift" or "fast" in the Chinook Jargon.

== Design and construction ==
Hyak was built at Golden, BC in 1892 for the Upper Columbia Navig. & Tramway Co., of which Capt. Frank P. Armstrong was the principal owner and manager.

== Operations ==
Hyak was operated on the upper Columbia route from Golden to Windermere Lake. In 1903 Hyak was sold to the Columbia River Lumber Company, which hired Armstrong to manage its steamboat operations.

== Fate ==
Hyak was removed from service in 1906.
