= Harper, Washington =

Unincorporated community in Washington, US

- Unincorporated community
- Location in Washington and the United States Harper (the United States)
- Coordinates: 47°31′14″N 122°31′10″W
- Country: United States
- State: Washington
- County: Kitsap
- Elevation: 16 ft (4.9 m)
- Time zone: UTC-8 (Pacific (PST))
  - Summer (DST): UTC-7 (PDT)
- GNIS feature ID: 1512273

Harper is an unincorporated community in Kitsap County, in the U.S. state of Washington. It is part of the Southworth census-designated place.

== History ==
A post office called Harper was established in 1900. The community was named after F. C. Harper, a state legislator.
