= Manchester State Park =

Manchester State Park may refer to:

- Manchester State Park (California), a state park in Mendocino County, California, United States
- Manchester State Park (Washington), a state park on the Kitsap Peninsula, Washington, United States
