= Creosote (disambiguation) =

Creosote is a category of carbonaceous chemicals formed by the distillation of tars and by the pyrolysis of plant-derived material.

Creosote may also refer to:

- Creosote bush, a flowering plant in the family Zygophyllaceae
- Creosote, Bainbridge Island, Washington, a locality in Washington State, U.S.A.
- Creosote, a character in Terry Pratchett's books whose name puns on Croesus
- Mr Creosote, a fictional character in Monty Python's The Meaning of Life, played by Terry Jones
- "Creosote", a song by Son Volt from the 1997 album Straightaways
- "Creosote", a song by The Desert Sessions from the 2003 album Volumes 9 & 10
- "Creosote", a song by Ashley McBryde from the 2026 album Wild

== See also ==
- Croesus
