= List of Bainbridge Island communities =

Communities

This is a list of communities in Bainbridge Island, Washington.

- Agate Point
- Allen Cove
- Arrow Point
- Azalea
- Bainbridge Grange
- Battle Point
- Bill Point
- Blakely
- Blue Heron
- Creosote
- Crystal Springs
- Eagledale
- Ferncliff
- Finch
- Fletcher Bay
- Fort Ward
- Hawley
- Hidden Cove
- Island Center
- Liberty
- Lovgren
- Lynwood Center
- Madrona Heights
- Manitou Beach
- Manzanita
- New Brooklyn
- Point Monroe
- Point White
- Port Blakely
- Port Madison
- Restoration Point
- Rolling Bay
- Seabold
- South Beach
- Tolo
- Torvanger
- Venice
- West Blakely
- West Port Madison
- Westwood
- Wing Point
- Winslow
- Yeomalt
