= Kitsap Regional Library =

Library system in Kitsap County, Washington

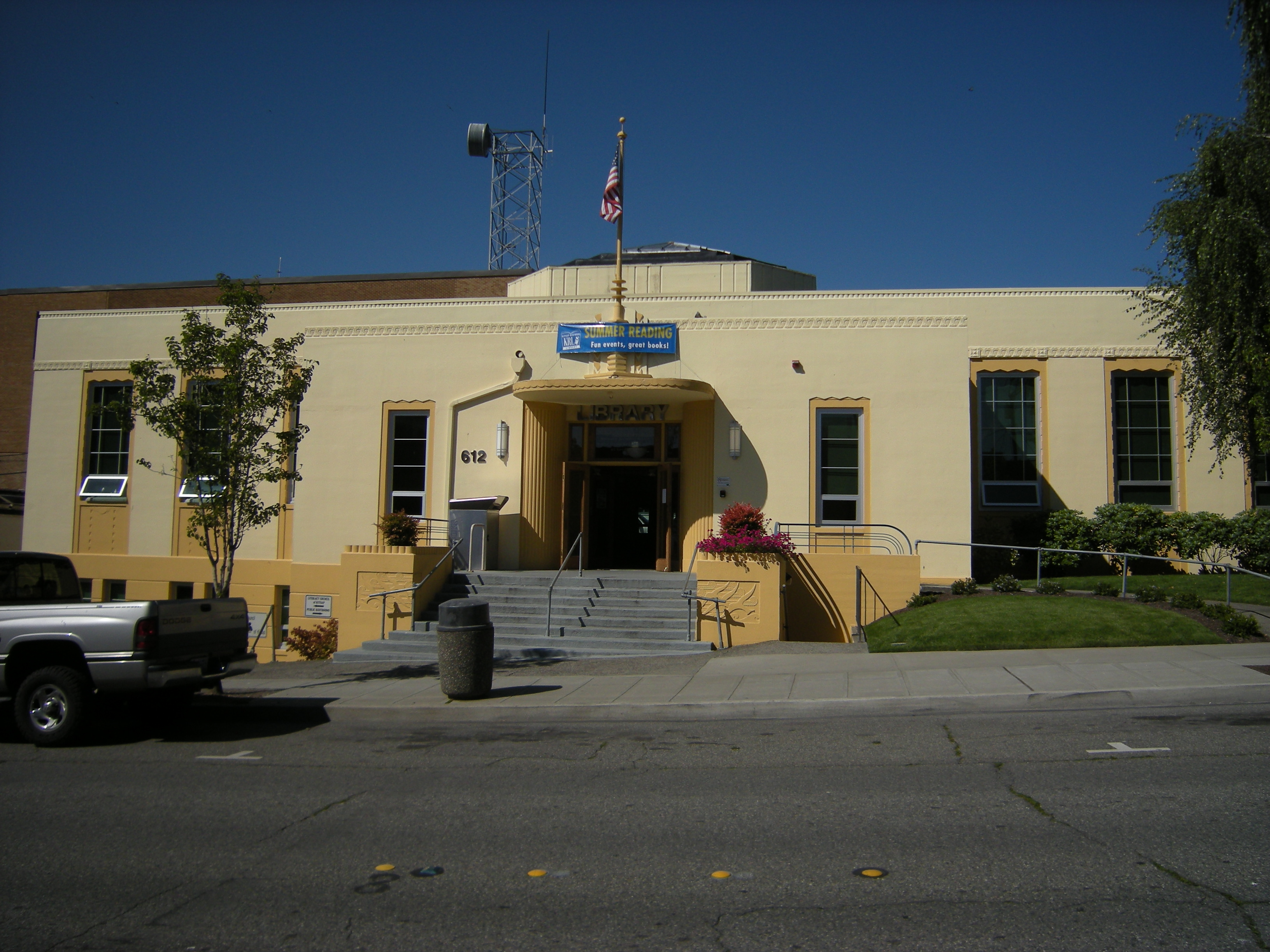
- Downtown Bremerton branch
- 47°35′42″N 122°37′30″W
- Location: Kitsap County, Washington
- Type: Public library
- Established: 1945
- Branches: 9

Collection
- Size: 312,733 items

Access and use
- Circulation: 2.4 million
- Population served: 280,900
- Members: 70,319

Other information
- Budget: $16.9 million (2022)
- Director: Jason Driver
- Website: krl.org
- References: Washington Public Library Statistical Report, 2022

The Kitsap Regional Library is a public library system in Kitsap County, Washington, United States. It has nine locations that serve over 280,000 residents in Kitsap County; its collection includes over 300,000 items that have an annual circulation of 2.4 million. Founded in 1945 as the Kitsap County Rural Library District, the modern system was formed from a 1955 merger with the Bremerton city library.

The library system is a primarily tax-funded organization overseen by a five-member board of trustees. Board members represent the five geographic regions of Kitsap County and are appointed for five-year terms. The library and its services are also funded by local civic organizations, Friends of the Library organizations, Bainbridge Library, Inc. and the Kitsap Regional Library Foundation.

== History ==
Bremerton library facility, c. 1938

The first major library in Kitsap County was the Bremerton Public Library, which was opened in June 1908 following approval by the city government. It was originally located at the former horse stables of the fire department and housed 1,000 books, primarily works donated by the Seattle Public Library and private contributors. For the next two decades, the library moved between several buildings in Bremerton as it outgrew various spaces.

Bremerton voters passed a bond measure in 1937 to build a permanent library, which would also be financed with Works Progress Administration grant. The new Bremerton Library opened on August 1, 1938. By 1938, the Bremerton Public Library was used by approximately 15,000 individuals throughout the area; during this time, the population of Bremerton itself was 10,000 people. The building was renovated in 2005 at a cost of $400,000, with one-fourth of costs provided by a donation from the Bill and Melinda Gates Foundation. The branch was renamed for civil rights leader Martin Luther King Jr. in 2024.

A county levy for areas in 1944 was passed to create the Kitsap County Rural Library District, which would serve most of the county. The Kitsap County Rural Library District operated under its own budget and staff until it merged with Bremerton Public Library on August 1, 1955.

At the date of its creation, Kitsap Regional Library included a regional service center at Bremerton; stations at Eglon, Retsil, Seabeck, Kingston, Erlands Point, Manchester, Navy Yard City, Port Gamble, Silverdale, Tracyton, Rolling Bay and Suquamish; and one branch library in Poulsbo. Two bookmobiles further extended service to rural areas. From 1955 until 1976, the system was headquartered in the historic downtown Bremerton location. However, demand for library services exceeded capacity and a new headquarters was built in 1976 at Sylvan Way. The building opened to the public in 1978.

== Locations ==
Kitsap Regional Library serves Kitsap County through nine physical locations. Each location offers a collection of books, audiobooks, CDs and DVDs and other materials; access to computers and technology assistance; public meeting spaces; and classes and events that are free and open to all.

Kitsap Regional Library locations
Name	Opened	Current building	Notes
Bainbridge Island	1863	1962	
Downtown Bremerton (Dr. Martin Luther King Jr Library)	1908	1938	
Kingston	1935	1935	
Little Boston	1974	2007	
Manchester	1947	1980	
Port Orchard	1924	1984	Annexed into KRL in 2010
Poulsbo	1918	2001	
Silverdale	1945	2022	
Sylvan Way (Bremerton)	1978	1978	Library headquarters

=== Bookmobile ===
The Library previously offered Bookmobile services. Bookmobile services in Kitsap County began in 1947 with "Molly," the Library's first bookmobile. A second bookmobile, "Little Chief," was added in 1954. Both bookmobiles ran until they were replaced by "Buttercup." A major fundraising effort in 2008 resulted in the purchase of the most recent bookmobile, "Violet." Bookmobile service was discontinued in 2018.

== Programs and services ==
In addition to book borrowing, the Kitsap Regional Library offers access to online databases and subscriptions as well as various programs at its branches.

The annual summer learning program includes prizes for reading and other activities, classes, and events. The library system launched its "One Book, One Community" program in 2008 that serves as a regionwide book discussion club that focuses on a set of books each year. In 2014, Kitsap Regional Library was selected as a John Cotton Dana Award for its Traveling Book Campaign, which utilized technology and guerrilla marketing—primarily by placing copies of the One Book selection around the county—to draw awareness within the local community to the programs.

In 2015, Kitsap Regional Library received a three-year National Leadership grant from the Institute of Museum and Library Services to design and implement a sustainable model of STEM programming for all public libraries. The project, titled Make Do Share, collects tools and resources to support staff in planning, facilitating and improving STEM programs for youth.

The Kitsap Regional Library also offers book group kits, loans on Discover Passes to visit Washington state parks, early learning kits for young children, STEM learning kits for young students, audiobook converters, a seed library, ukuleles, and video games.

== Funding ==
In addition to taxpayer funding, the library receives contributions through the Kitsap Regional Library Foundation, a 501(c)(3) corporation qualified to receive tax-deductible donations. There are also seven active Friends of the Library groups that organize volunteers to run book sales and fundraising events.

=== Building ownership ===
Kitsap Regional Library currently owns two of its library facilities: the Poulsbo and Sylvan Way locations. The facilities in downtown Bremerton and Port Orchard are owned by the city in which they are located. The remaining locations are owned by separate entities: the Little Boston location is owned by the Port Gamble S'Klallam Tribe; the Kingston location is owned by the Metropolitan Parks District; the Manchester Location is owned by the Manchester Friends of the Library, the Silverdale location is owned by the Central Kitsap School District and the Bainbridge Island location is owned by Bainbridge Island Public Library, Inc. Kitsap Regional Library provides staffing, library services and resources and non-structural, routine maintenance for each location.

== Grants and awards ==
=== Grants ===
- Paul Allen Family Foundation Grant, 2013
- National Leadership Grant for Libraries, 2015

=== Awards ===
- John Cotton Dana Award, 2014 2018
- LibraryAware Community Award Honoree, 2014
- National Medal finalist, Institute of Museum and Library Services, 2016
- PR xChange Awards, Library Leadership and Management Association, American Library Association, 2011–2013, 2015-2017
