= Pritchard Park =

State park in the U.S. State of Washington

Coordinates: 47°37′N 122°30′W

- Interactive map of Pritchard Park
- Location: Eagle Harbor, Bainbridge Island, Washington, USA
- Area: 50 acres (20 ha)
- Created: 2006

Pritchard Park is a 50-acre (20 ha) former Superfund environmental cleanup site on the shore of Bainbridge Island's Eagle Harbor in Washington state.

The Bainbridge Island Japanese American Exclusion Memorial is within the park.

== History ==
The Pacific Creosoting Company, later known as Wyckoff Company, occupied the site until the 1980s, and supported the community of Creosote. Government agencies estimate that 600,000 US gallons (2,300,000 L; 500,000 imp gal) of creosote still remain in the ground at the site, after more than $100 million in environmental remediation.

Acquisition of the property was made by a partnership including Bainbridge Island Land Trust, Bainbridge Island Metropolitan Park and Recreation District, the City of Bainbridge Island, the Suquamish Tribe, the Bainbridge Island Japanese American Community, and The Trust for Public Land. Purchase by City of Bainbridge Island was completed in early 2006.

== Naming ==
The park is named for Congressman and Lieutenant Governor of Washington Joel Pritchard.

== Sources ==
- Mueller, Marge; Mueller, Ted (2006), Afoot and Afloat: South Puget Sound and Hood Canal, The Mountaineers Books, ISBN 0898869528
