= Manchester State Park (Washington) =

State park in Washington (state), United States

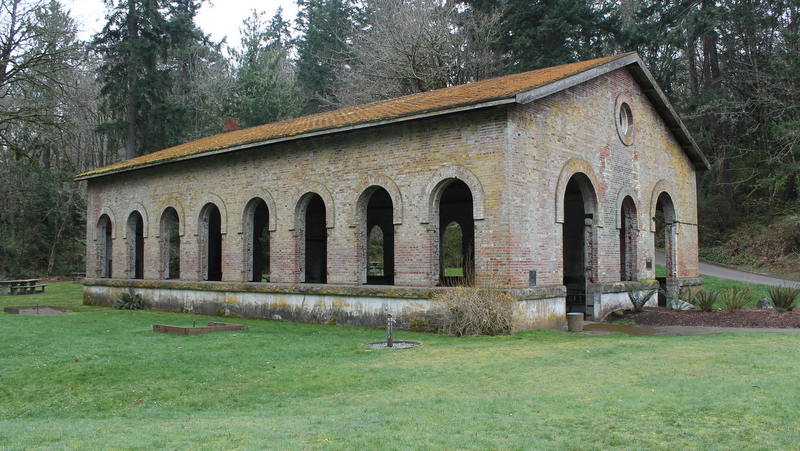
- Former torpedo building, now a picnic shelter

- Location within Washington (state) Location within the United States
- Location: Kitsap County, Washington, United States
- Coordinates: 47°49′04″N 122°38′58″W
- Area: 111 acres (45 ha)
- Elevation: 20 ft (6.1 m)
- Established: 1970
- Administrator: Washington State Parks and Recreation Commission
- Visitors: 261,014 (in 2024)
- Website: Official website

Manchester State Park is a 111-acre (45 ha) state park in Kitsap County, Washington, United States. It is situated on the east side of the Kitsap Peninsula with 3,400 feet (1,000 m) of shoreline facing Puget Sound. It was at one time a harbor defense installation for the nearby Bremerton, then a fuel supply depot and U.S. Navy fire-fighting station. The park contains a former torpedo warehouse, a mining casement, and a gun battery. Park activities include picnicking, camping, boating, fishing, hiking on 1.9 miles (3.1 km) of trails, birdwatching, volleyball, wildlife viewing, and horseshoes.

== History ==
Manchester State Park, originally called Middle Point Military Reservation, was used as a fortification with Fort Ward on Bainbridge Island to protect the Puget Sound Naval Shipyard in Bremerton during the early 1900s. The Coast Artillery Corps established Middle Point while the defense of the Puget Sound Naval Shipyard became a priority for the United States Army and United States Navy.

Since Fort Ward could protect part of Puget Sound with its four coastal artillery batteries, the primary defensive tactic at Middle Point was the operation of a minefield in Rich Passage. The mines were electrically controlled from a mining casemate, being able to detonate at the will of the operator instead of from direct contact. In 1901, a torpedo warehouse was built at Middle Point as a place to store the naval mines that would be used in the minefield. Later, the warehouse was "used as an officers' club, barracks, and mess hall".

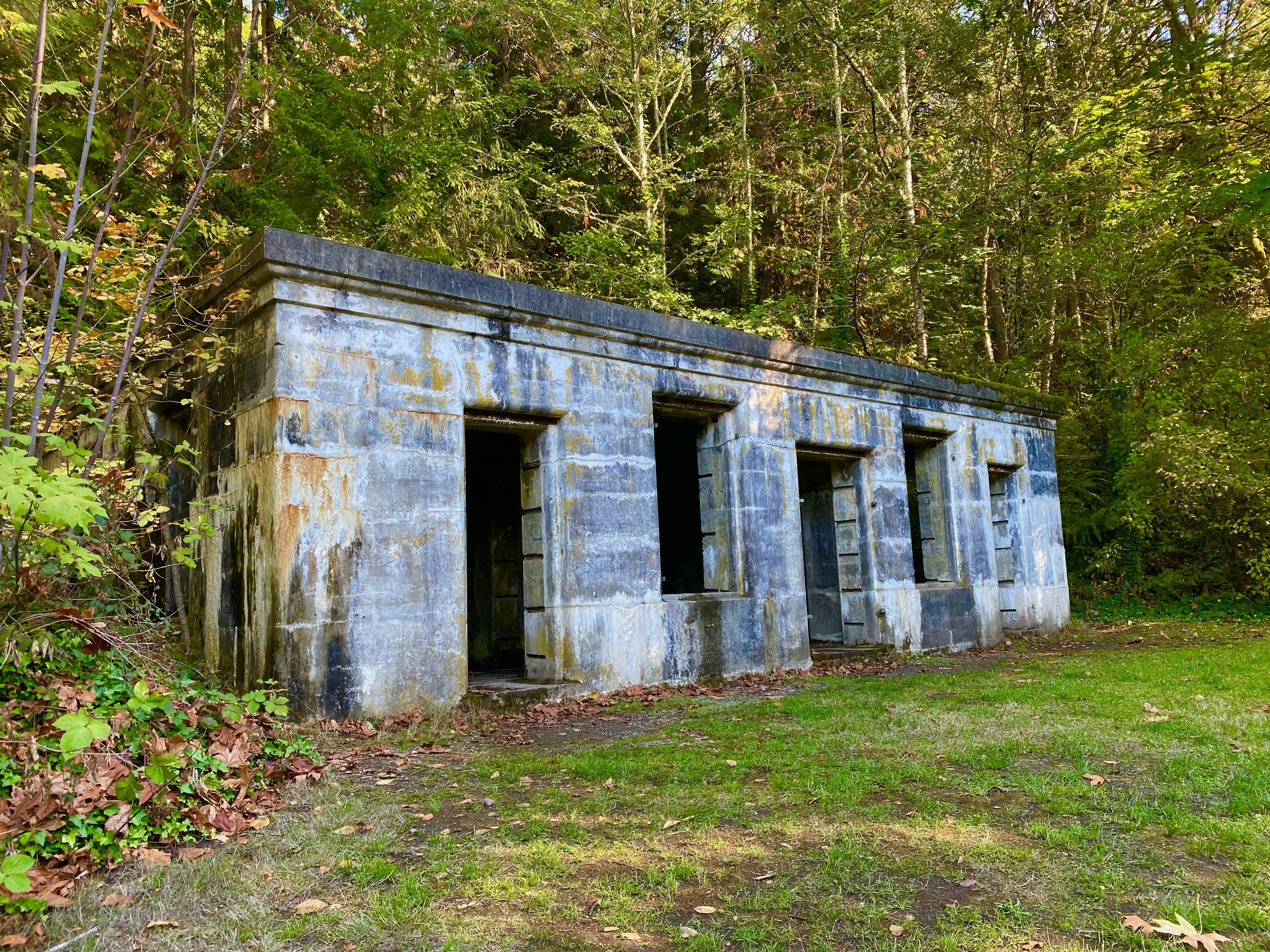
Former mining casemate at Manchester State Park

Middle Point's gun battery, Battery Mitchell, was designed to have two 3-inch rapid-fire guns as an added defense for the Rich Passage minefield. However, the guns were never fitted due to Fort Ward having the necessary gun emplacements to protect it from Bainbridge Island. Battery Mitchell's layout includes rooms where ammunition would have been stored for the guns, and rooms where soldiers would have sought protection under enemy fire. The gun battery is named after Lieutenant Robert B. Mitchell.

Although Middle Point never encountered any threats, the Navy controlled it through World War I and World War II as a fuel supply depot and fire-fighting station until it was decommissioned in 1958. After the state of Washington claimed it in 1970, the land became Manchester State Park, named after the town of Manchester, Washington. It remained undeveloped until the state government was able to fund cleanup and construction of campsites. The park opened to the public on May 22, 1981.

== Activities and amenities ==
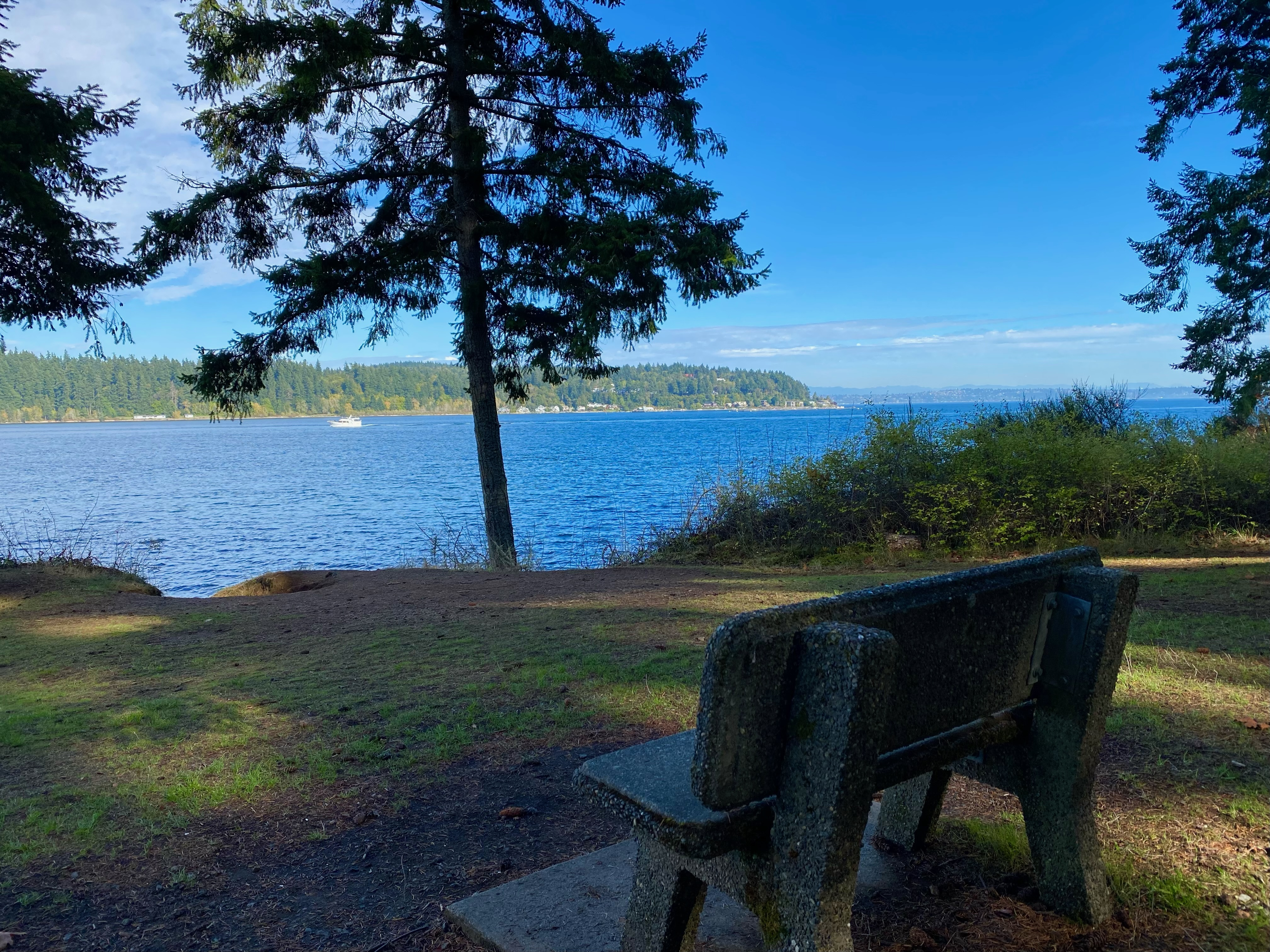
View of Rich Passage and Bainbridge Island from Battery Mitchell

Manchester State Park offers standard and RV campsites that are open year round, two picnic shelters, 1.9 miles (3.1 km) of hiking trails, public restrooms, and beach access.

Water activities include boating, diving, kayaking, and saltwater fishing. Other activities include hiking, picnicking, birdwatching, volleyball, badminton, wildlife viewing, horseshoes, and mountain biking.

The former torpedo warehouse is open to the public and can be reserved for special occasions, such as weddings and reunions.

In 2015, three exhibit signs were installed at the park as a part of a park improvement plan. The signs explain the area's coastal defense history to visitors.
