= Manzanita, Bainbridge Island, Washington =

Coordinates: 47°40′34.9″N 122°33′39.5″W

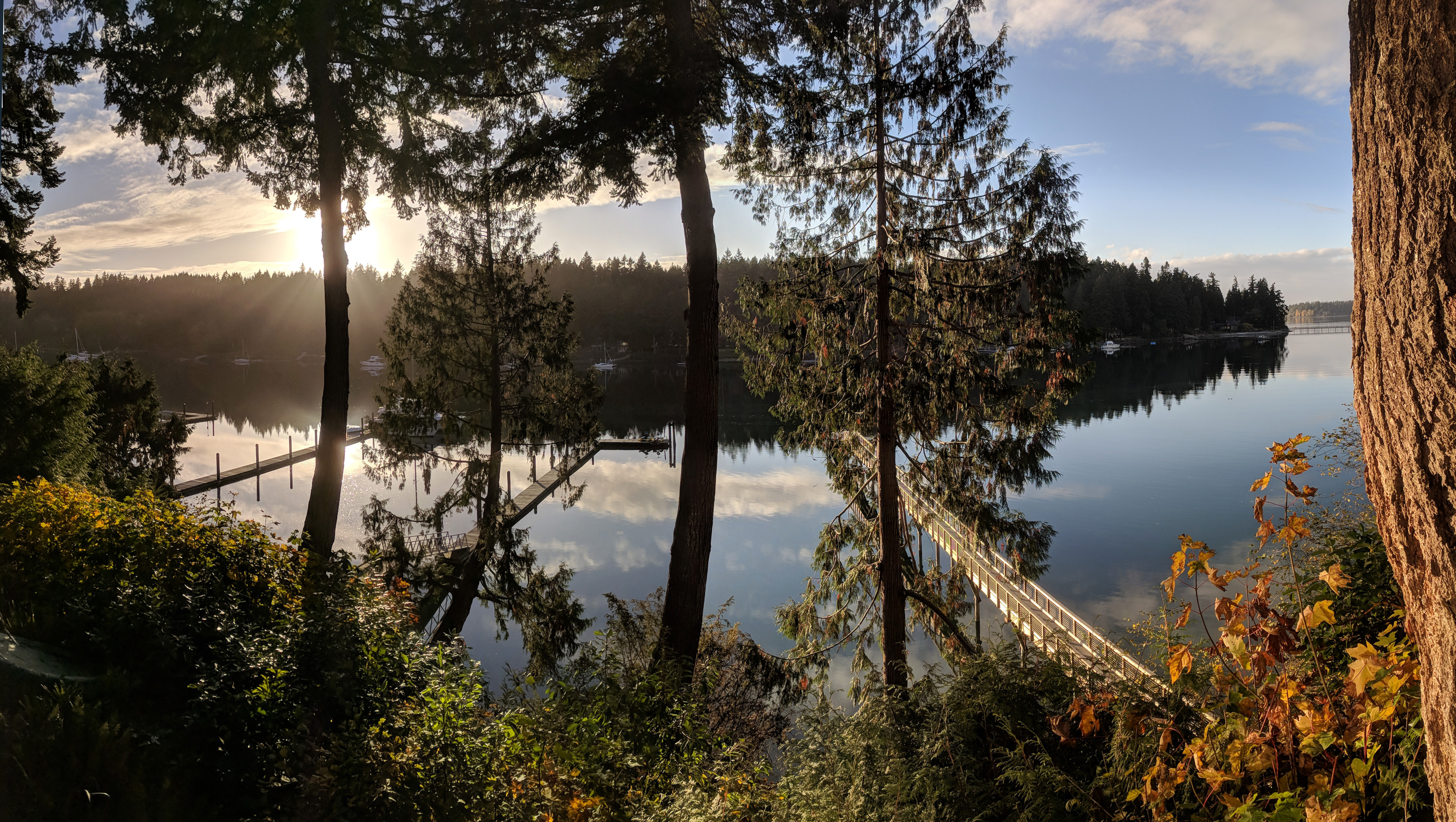
Shoreline homes in Bainbridge Island's Manzanita neighborhood have west-facing water vistas; some in Manzanita Bay have deep-water docks. A portion of the Kitsap Peninsula near Poulsbo is visible from the Manzanita neighborhood (beyond Arrow Point on the right in this photo).

Manzanita is a community of Bainbridge Island, Washington. It is located on the waterfront on the west side of the island along Manzanita Road NE and the east shore of Manzanita Bay, including Little Manzanita Bay.

A 1908 home on the north shore of Little Manzanita Bay was owned at different times by the sons of George Westinghouse and Charles Lindbergh.

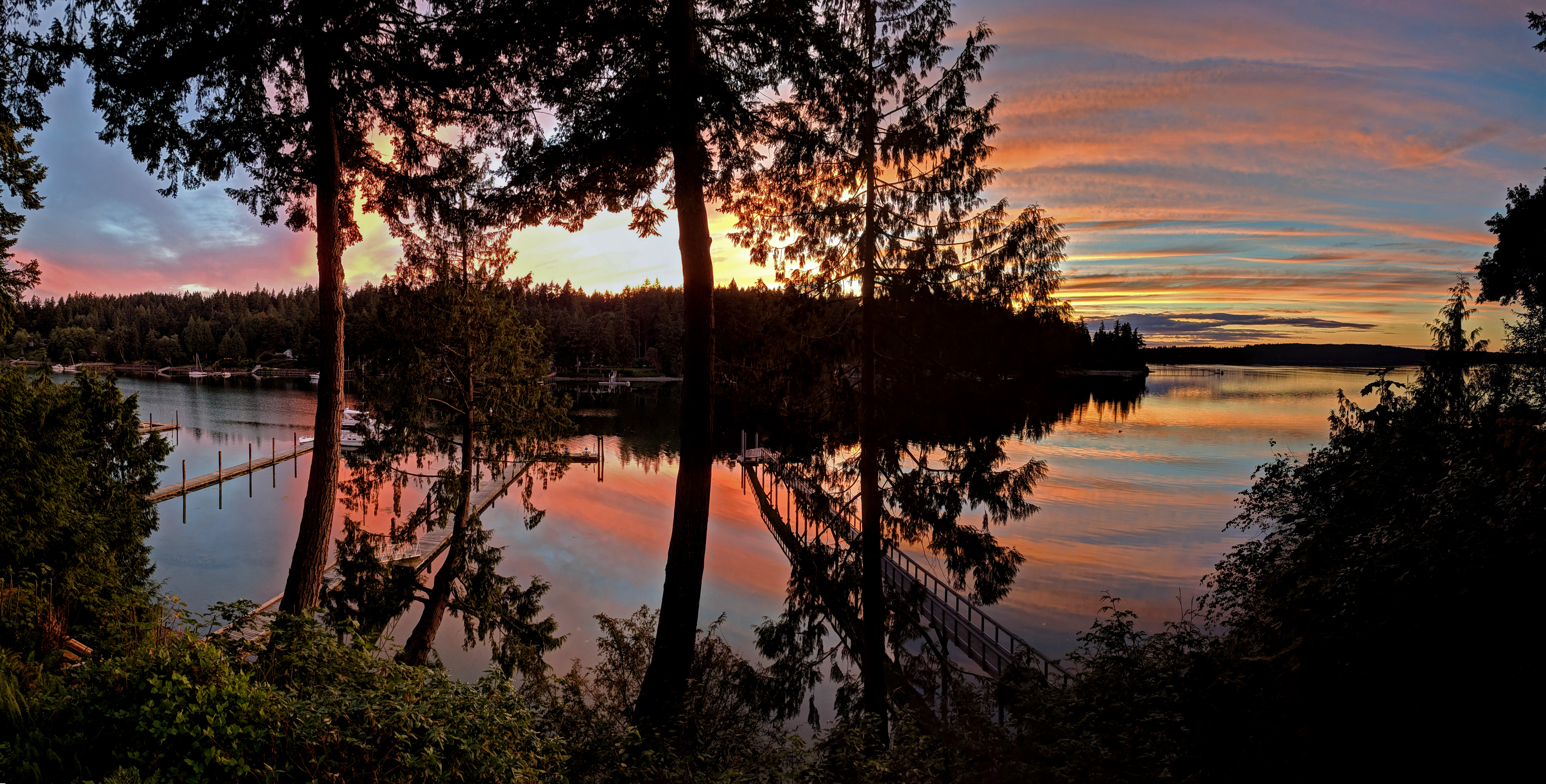
West-facing views over water often reflect colorful sunsets, as in this panoramic view.

== See also ==
- List of Bainbridge Island communities
