= Fort Ward Park =

Park in Washington

Coordinates: 47.58637°N 122.52708°W

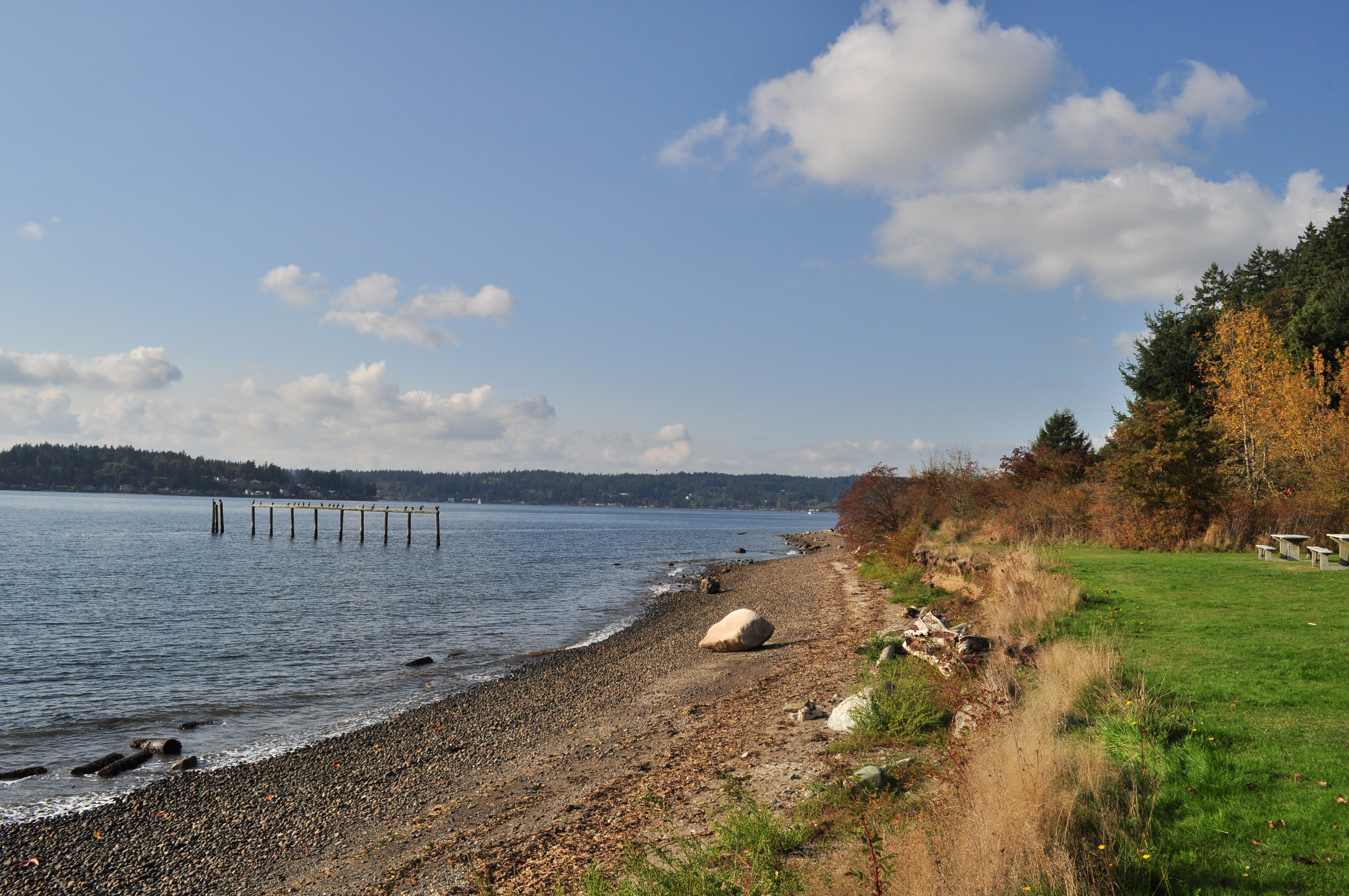
A view of Fort Ward Park

Fort Ward Park is park located along Rich Passage on the southern end of Bainbridge Island in Washington State, United States. Fort Ward Park is part of the Bainbridge Island Metro Park and Recreation District, on land which the former military base, Fort Ward, was located. It was a state park from 1960 to 2011 but is now locally managed.

Covering 137 acres (0.55 km^{2}) of dense forest and underbrush, clam digging, birdwatching and scuba diving are some of the activities available for park visitors.

== History ==
In 1903, Fort Ward was officially commissioned as a seacoast fort with the primary objective of protecting the Bremerton Naval Shipyard. Two gun batteries are located in the park. During World War II, the Navy used the fort as a radio station and training school for communication personnel and installed a submarine net across Rich Passage. In 1958, the Navy decommissioned the fort, and State Parks purchased Fort Ward in 1960. The park still includes two remnant gun batteries. Ownership of the Park was transferred to the Bainbridge Island Metro Park & Recreation District in the Spring of 2011.

== Facilities ==
Fort Ward Park has a public boat ramp and a parking lot for about 25 cars and boat trailers. The boat launch is concrete, donated by the Bainbridge Island Rotary Club. There are vault toilets located in the parking area near the boat launch ramp. The park has 4,300 feet of saltwater shoreline.

There are two picnic areas located in the park. The lower picnic area along the beach is accessible only by foot or bicycle and has eight picnic sites. The upper picnic area is accessible by car and also has eight picnic sites. Each picnic area has vault toilets as well as potable water.
