= MV Crosline =

Canadian ferry boat

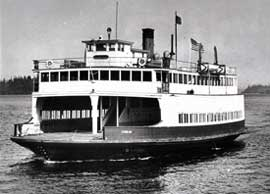
- above : Crosline in service, prior to 1940. When serving in Vancouver BC, the auto deck was enclosed for passenger-only service; upon her return to the United States, the ferry was converted to double-ended operation.

History
- Name: Crosline
- Owner: Crosby Direct Line Ferries, Puget Sound Navigation Co., and others
- Builder: Marine Construction Co., Seattle, WA
- Launched: June 22, 1925
- In service: 1925
- Out of service: 1967
- Identification: US registry #224839; Radio Call Letters: WH7219
- Fate: Converted to shoreside structure.
- Notes: Designed by L.H. Coolidge. Reconstructed 1947.

General characteristics
- Type: Auto/ passenger ferry
- Length: As built : 150 ft (45.72 m)
- Beam: As built :48 ft (14.63 m)
- Installed power: Originally : 750 HP Sumner diesel engine.
- Capacity: 65 automobiles

The MV Crosline was a wooden, diesel ship launched in Seattle on June 22, 1925 for the Crosby Direct Line Ferry Company. It could carry 300 passengers and 65 cars.

== Career ==
Crosline was originally built for the Alki-Manchester Ferry route on Puget Sound in Washington state.

On May 20, 1942, the Crosline arrived in Vancouver to join the Burrard Inlet ferries. It was purchased because of the need for more ferries to take shipyard workers to the north shore. In 1947, after the war, the Crosline was sold to the ferry system of the Washington State Department of Highways where it was rebuilt into a double-ended ferry with a pilothouse and propulsion on both ends of the ferry. It served with the MV Skansonia on the route between Gig Harbor and Point Defiance until 1950, when the second Tacoma Narrows Bridge opened. In 1951, Washington State Ferries was formed when the state acquired almost all of the Black Ball Line's assets, and the Crosline joined WSF's fleet.

The Crosline's last trip was the 9:55 p.m. departure on Labor Day of 1967. The ferry system sold the ship later in the year on December 19. It was first used as a warehouse on Lake Union, than sold again in 1975, where it was moved to Coos Bay, Oregon to be used as a restaurant. The restaurant failed, and instead her superstructure was removed to become a warehouse again, but this time shore-based. Crosline's hull was eventually disassembled, and the remaining timbers and planks became part of a fishing boat and a dock.
