= Manchester, Washington =

- Census-designated place
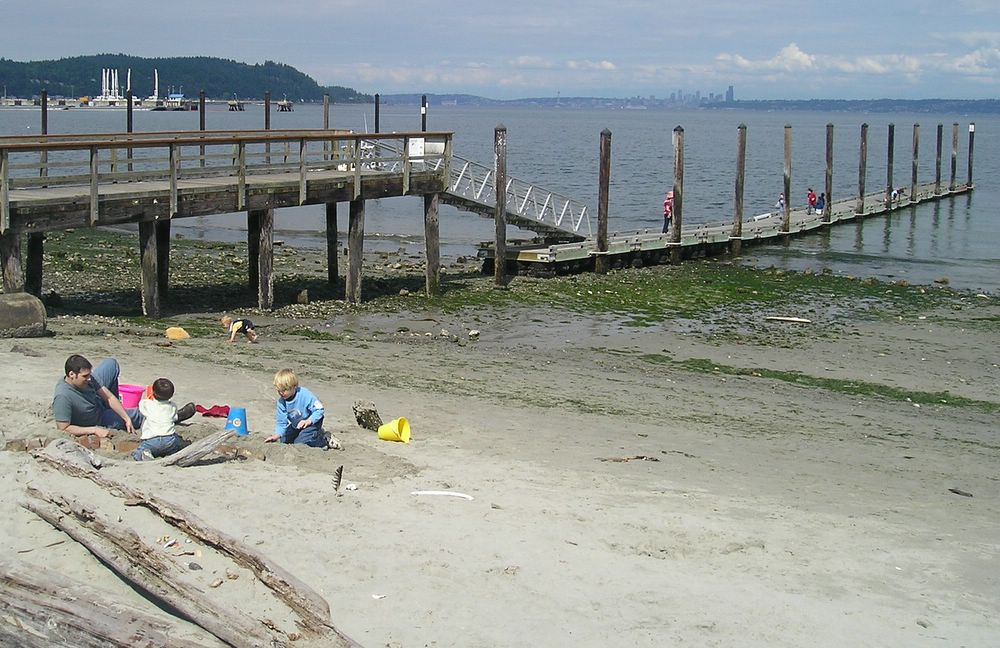
- The public pier and waterfront at Manchester during a summer low tide. Bainbridge Island is in the background on the left, and Seattle is far away on the right.

- Location of Manchester, Washington
- Coordinates: 47°33′03″N 122°32′32″W
- Country: United States
- State: Washington
- County: Kitsap

Area
  - Total: 5.65 sq mi (14.64 km^{2})
  - Land: 2.93 sq mi (7.58 km^{2})
  - Water: 2.73 sq mi (7.06 km^{2})
- Elevation: 89 ft (27 m)

Population (2010)
  - Total: 5,413
  - Density: 1,851/sq mi (714.6/km^{2})
- Time zone: UTC-8 (Pacific (PST))
  - Summer (DST): UTC-7 (PDT)
- ZIP Code: 98353
- Area code(s): 360, 564
- FIPS code: 53-42450
- GNIS feature ID: 2408167

Manchester is an unincorporated community and census-designated place (CDP) in Kitsap County, Washington, United States. The population was 5,714 at the 2020 census. Manchester is located on the Puget Sound approximately 10 miles from downtown Seattle, and is adjacent to county seat Port Orchard to its east. Today, Manchester labels itself as a village. It is small in size but is home to a Kitsap Regional Library (KRL) branch, a post office, an elementary school, and a beachfront park to serve its residents.

== History ==
Manchester was established in the 1860s and was originally known as "Brooklyn", after the borough in New York City. The name was changed to "Manchester" in 1892 in honor of the city of Manchester, England. Manchester was accessible by land via Shelton/Allyn/Belfair, but the main population center in the region, Seattle, had only boat access. After a permanent dock was built in 1908, regular steamboat service connected Manchester to nearby communities like Colby, Southworth, and Harper, and to Seattle across the water.

From 1925 to 1936, a ferry route across Puget Sound connected Manchester with Alki Point in West Seattle. When the Alki Point dock washed away in 1936, the Seattle terminus was shifted to Colman Dock on the Seattle central waterfront. Ferry service was discontinued in 1936 and never resumed.

In its early years, Manchester was used as a military installation. As early as 1889, land in present-day Manchester was used by the U.S War Department as part of a Puget Sound defense system After World War I, the U.S. Navy acquired the property, and in 1940 built a pier in nearby Clam Bay for refueling ships. The Manchester Fuel Depot, currently the military's largest single fuel station in the U.S., saw heavy use during World War II and still operates today. While the Navy still owns most of the original land, some of the property is now occupied by Manchester State Park as well as by Environmental Protection Agency and NOAA labs.

In 1953, the library in Manchester was slated for destruction. The town pulled together and a new library was constructed in 1954. Today, Manchester has excellent views of Seattle, Mount Rainier, and Puget Sound, has a public boat launch, a boat parade on the opening day of boating season, and sponsors salmon bakes at the Manchester library.

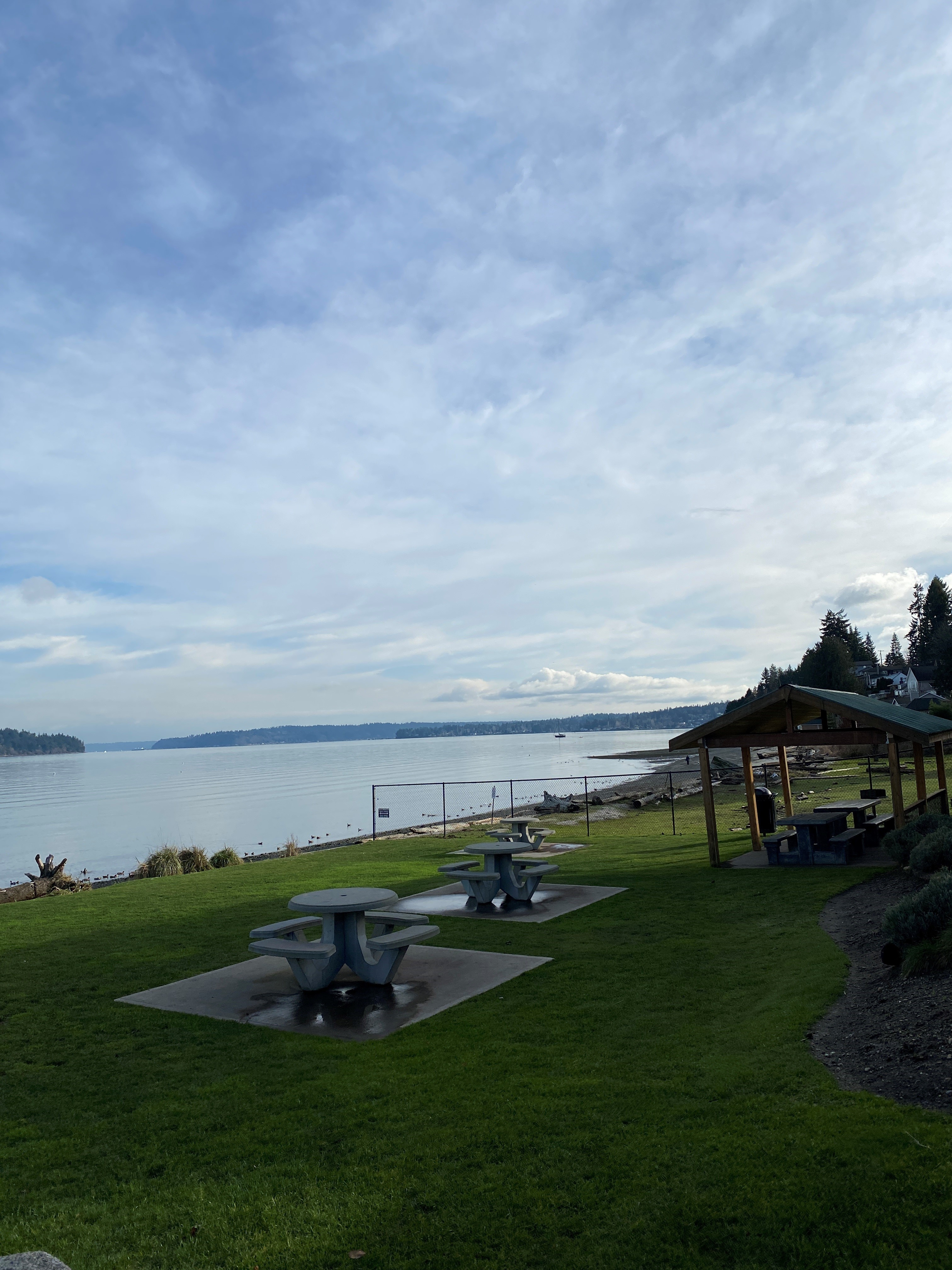
Pomeroy Park in Manchester, featuring picnic tables and shelter as well as a small public beach area.

== Geography ==
Manchester is located in southeastern Kitsap County at 47°33′08″N 122°33′00″W (47.552305, -122.549984). It is on the west side of Puget Sound from Rich Passage in the north to Yukon Harbor in the south. Manchester is 6 miles (10 km) east of Port Orchard, the Kitsap county seat. Manchester State Park is to the north, just outside the CDP area.

According to the United States Census Bureau, the Manchester CDP has a total area of 5.6 square miles (14.6 km^{2}), of which 2.9 square miles (7.6 km^{2}) are land and 2.7 square miles (7.1 km^{2}), or 48.25%, are water. Besides Manchester proper, the CDP contains the smaller communities of Colchester and Colby.

=== Climate ===
This region experiences warm (but not hot) and dry summers, with the highest average temperatures in late July and early August, at around 77 °F. According to the Köppen Climate Classification system, Manchester has a warm-summer Mediterranean climate, abbreviated "Csb" on climate maps. Manchester generally experiences both mild summers and winters, with average annual snowfall of around 3 inches. On average, each year there are 122 days with measurable rain totaling 41 inches.

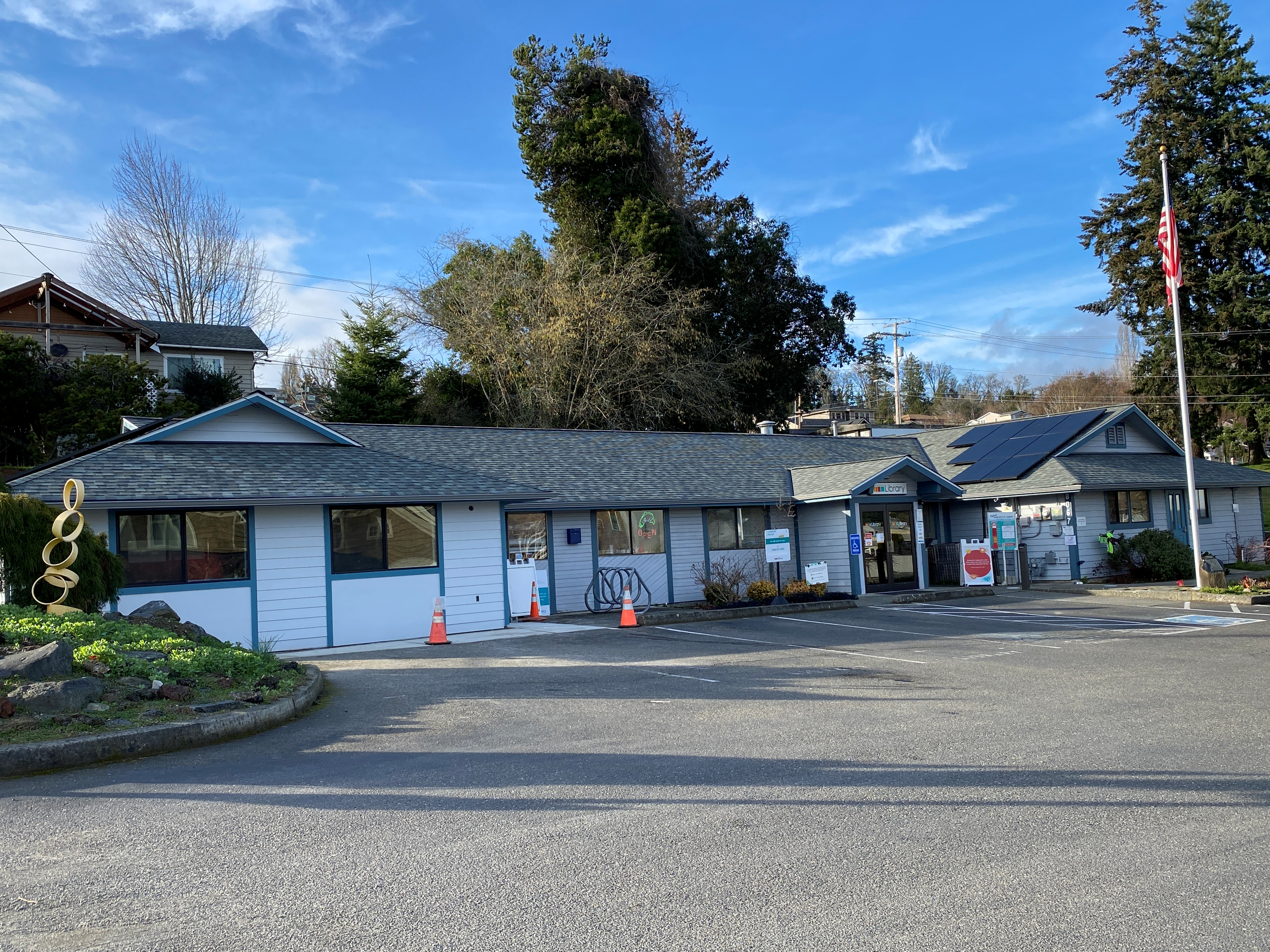
The Manchester library after 2021 renovations.

== Education and culture ==
Manchester is a part of South Kitsap School District. The CDP itself is home to an elementary school, Manchester Elementary, that enrolled 413 students across grades Pre K-5 as of the 2020-2021 school year. Manchester Elementary feeds into John Sedgwick Middle School and South Kitsap High School.

Manchester also has a library, which in 2021 underwent renovations to update the interior and expand the building itself, including the addition of solar panels to offset future energy costs. Volunteer group Friends of the Manchester Library hosts a variety of fundraising and community events throughout the year. These events range from Fathers' Day salmon bakes and a Christmas tree lighting to summer farmers' markets and plant sales.

== Demographics ==
=== 2020 census ===
According to the 2020 census, Manchester's population was 5,714. The population density was 1,850.7 people per square mile, and there were 2,373 housing units, of which 2,246 were occupied. Within Manchester's population, 86.2% of residents were White, 1.2% Black or African American, 0.5% Native American, 2.4% Asian, 1.6% Pacific Islander, and 5.6% from two or more races. Hispanic or Latino people of any race made up 6.4% of the population.

There were 2,077 households in the CDP, with an average household size of 2.73 people and an average family size of 3.04. Of the households, 58.5% were married couples living together, 16.7% had a female householder with no spouse present, and 15.2% had a male householder with no spouse present. 25.8% of the population was under age 18, while 14.9% were over age 65.

The median household income in Manchester was $80,045, while the median income for a family was $82,455. Married-couple families had the highest median income of any household type. at $106,066. For the entire CDP, the per-capita income was $34,000. 11.7% of the population was below the federal poverty line, including 17% of people under age 18 and 6.3% of people over age 65.

=== 2000 census ===
As of the census of 2000, there were 4,958 people, 1,819 households, and 1,395 families residing in the CDP. The population density was 1,693.4 people per square mile (653.3/km^{2}). There were 1,913 housing units at an average density of 653.4/sq mi (252.1/km^{2}). The racial makeup of the CDP was 87.7% White, 1.3% African American, 1.1% Native American, 2.7% Asian, 0.9% Pacific Islander, 1.4% from other races, and 5.0% from two or more races. Hispanic or Latino of any race were 3.8% of the population.

There were 1,819 households, out of which 39.4% had children under the age of 18 living with them, 62.7% were married couples living together, 9.8% had a female householder with no husband present, and 23.3% were non-families. 17.3% of all households were made up of individuals, and 5.3% had someone living alone who was 65 years of age or older. The average household size was 2.73 and the average family size was 3.06.

In the CDP, the population was spread out, with 28.9% under the age of 18, 6.4% from 18 to 24, 31.5% from 25 to 44, 24.7% from 45 to 64, and 8.5% who were 65 years of age or older. The median age was 36 years. For every 100 females, there were 96.5 males. For every 100 females age 18 and over, there were 93.7 males.

The median income for a household in the CDP was $52,213, and the median income for a family was $56,118. Males had a median income of $39,695 versus $26,875 for females. The per capita income for the CDP was $21,946. About 4.9% of families and 5.5% of the population were below the poverty line, including 7.7% of those under age 18 and 1.5% of those age 65 or over.
