= Fort Ward (Washington) =

- Fort Ward Historic District
- U.S. National Register of Historic Places
- U.S. Historic district
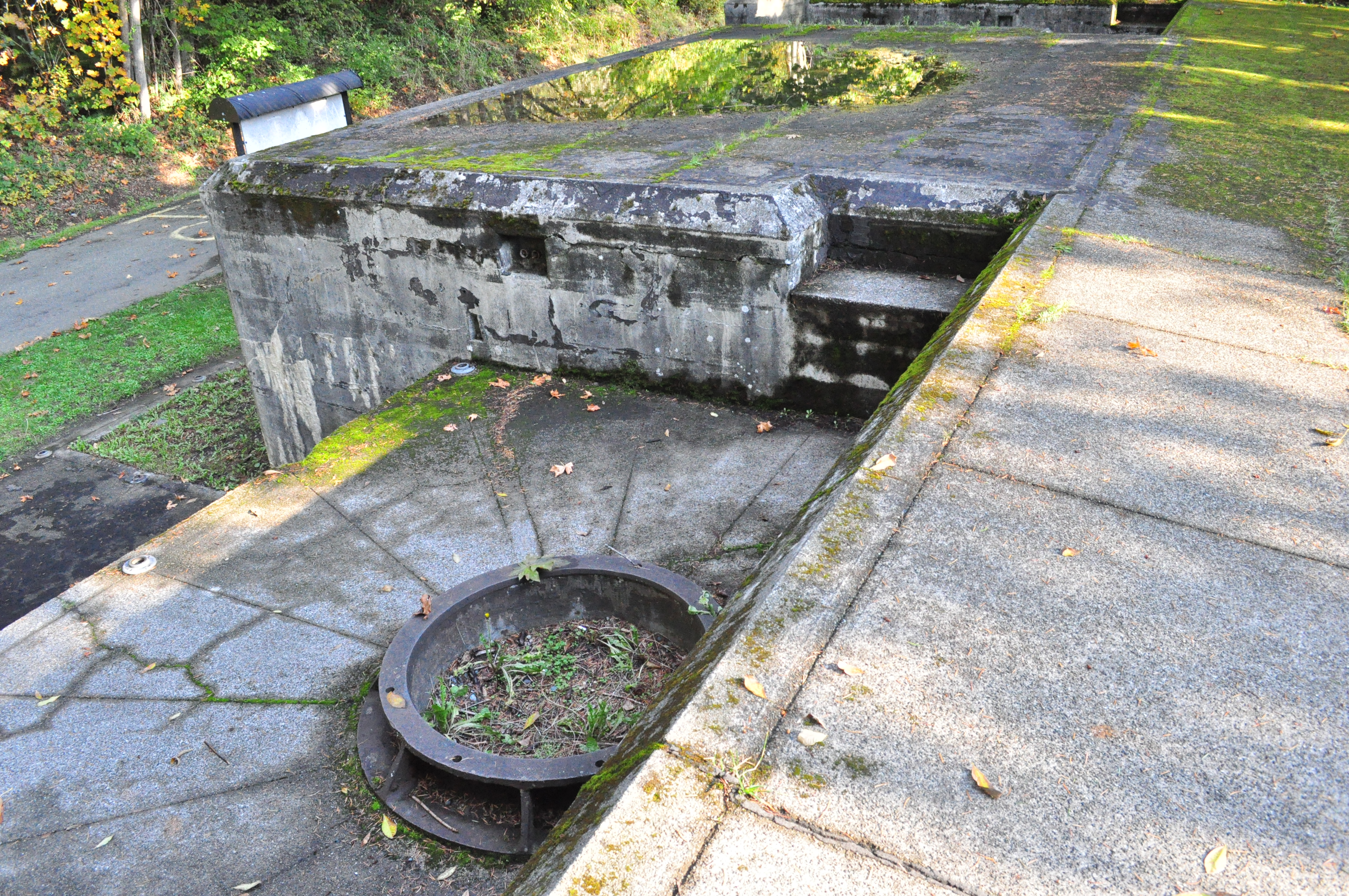
- Battery Vinton, 2013

- Location within Washington (state)
- Nearest city: Bainbridge Island, Washington
- Coordinates: 47°34′52″N 122°31′42″W
- Area: 166 acres (67 ha)
- NRHP reference No.: 78002759; 96000415 (boundary increase)
- Added to NRHP: January 12, 1978; April 12, 1996 (boundary increase)

Fort Ward is a former United States Army coastal artillery fort, and later, a Navy installation located on the southwest side of Bainbridge Island, Washington, along Rich Passage.

== History ==
=== Early ===
During the 1880s, the Endicott Board, convened by Secretary of War William C. Endicott made sweeping recommendations for new or upgraded coastal defense installations and weapons systems. As the 20th century approached, American military strategists realized that heavy, fixed artillery required a very different training program than lighter, mobile field artillery.

Fort Ward was originally known as Beans Point and was established in 1890, as one of several US Army Coastal Artillery Corps installations, including Fort Flagler, Fort Casey and Fort Worden, built to defend Puget Sound from enemy warships. Its primary objective was to protect the nearby Bremerton Naval Shipyard.

In 1903, the Army officially designated Beans Point as a seacoast fort and named it Fort Ward in honor of Colonel George H. Ward. Activity in and around the fort continued as new buildings were constructed and new troops arrived.

The coastal artillery batteries located at Fort Ward were:

- Battery Nash (1903–1918), three 8-inch (203 mm) M1888 guns mounted on disappearing carriages, hidden along the bluff, now on private property;
- Battery Warner (1903–1925), two 5-inch (127 mm) M1900 pillar mounted guns, now on private property and surrounded by modern homes;
- Battery Thornburgh (1903–1920), four 3-inch (76 mm) M1898MI masking parapet mounted guns;
- Battery Vinton (1903–1920), two 3-inch M1898MI masking parapet mounted guns.

Battery Vinton is one of four batteries at Fort Ward. It had two 3-inch 1897 [sic] model guns. These guns, along with the other batteries, guarded an underwater mine field placed across Rich Passage. The guns were removed on July 19th, 1920 – never having been fired for defense, and were to be shipped to France for use in WWI.

In the 1920s, Fort Ward was placed on inactive status, but a small number of men were still stationed there. In 1928, the fort was essentially left abandoned. The fort remained abandoned for several years, until 1935, it served as a state-operated fresh air camp for inner city children from Seattle.

=== Before and during World War II ===
In 1938, the U.S. Navy took over Fort Ward from the U.S. Army, and confiscated several surrounding properties and evicted the owners. The U.S. Navy found the fort to be attractive after tests had shown that it was an outstanding location to eavesdrop on radio communication transmitted from the Far East, chiefly Japan. In August 1939, the U.S. Navy relocated the Astoria, Oregon, intercept site to Fort Ward. This was the beginning of the development of Fort Ward as a top-secret military listening post.

In August 1940, the U.S. Navy had five sites with diplomatic targets which were all linked directly, or indirectly through U.S. Army communication circuits, to Washington, D.C., via radio and landline communications. These sites were Winter Harbor, Maine; Amagansett, New York; Cheltenham, Maryland; Jupiter, Florida; and Fort Ward—Bainbridge Island, Washington.

Rhombic antennas were installed on the Parade Ground, and the old post exchange/gymnasium building was converted into a top secret listening post code-named "Station S". Inside "Station S", men and women worked 24 hours a day, listening in on Japanese naval communications, which were transmitted in the Japanese Morse Code. This building is now a private home.

The listening post activities were so top secret that personnel on the base were instructed not to look at the building when they walked by it.

Meanwhile, the Navy developed a "cover story" for what was happening at Naval Radio Station Bainbridge Island. The story—that it was one of the few Naval Reserve Radio Schools in the nation—received a full page of coverage in The Seattle Times on January 11, 1941. Some of the sailors pictured in the article actually worked at "Station S" after their training. Photos show the sailors copying Morse code in a classroom, setting up a Morse code-sending machine, and marching from their school building to noon mess.

In March 1941, a commercial teletype line between the installations at Winter Harbor, Maine, Amagansett, New York, and Fort Ward was inaugurated. Communications between Washington, D.C., and its far-flung resources in the Pacific continued to be primitive. Messages and intercept logs, reports and professional correspondence, if classified, were painstakingly enciphered by the radio intelligence officer himself using special equipment and instructions. If transmitted as messages on manual Morse code circuits or landlines, they were delivered to the communications center where they were again enciphered. The Fort Ward command also oversaw the construction of the Navy's largest radio transmitter at Battle Point, with a tower 300 feet taller than the Space Needle. This was used to send messages to Navy Command at Pier 91 in Seattle.

The first chapter of David Kahn's book tells about how "Station S" intercepted the communication from Tokyo to the Japanese Ambassador that instructed him to break off negotiations just before the attack on Pearl Harbor on December 7, 1941.

During World War II, a submarine net was placed across Rich Passage.

In November 1942, Fort Ward also assumed control of naval intelligence assignments previously tasked to the Royal Canadian Navy.

During World War II, the U.S. Navy radio station operations consisted of:

- Supplementary Station (School, D/F and Intercept), Bainbridge Island, Port Blakely, Washington
- Naval Radio Transmitting Station, Bainbridge Island, Wash. (located at Battle Point)
- U.S. Naval Radio Direction Finder Station, Bainbridge Island, Port Blakely
- Naval Training School (Radio-Special), Bainbridge Island, Port Blakely
- Naval Radio Activities, Bainbridge Island, Port Blakely
- Supplementary Radio Station, Bainbridge Island, Port Blakely

After World War II, personnel on the base (which was transferred back to the U.S. Army in 1956) continued to listen in on radio transmissions—first Korean and then Soviet. Activity continued at the radio station until 1956.

=== Post World War II ===
The U.S. Army abandoned all operations in 1958. Upon this second deactivation, the Washington State Park System negotiated for acquisition of part of the fort in 1960, which became Fort Ward State Park. In 2011, it was transferred to the Bainbridge Island Metro Park & Recreation District and became Fort Ward Park. The naval radio transmitting station located at Battle Point was deactivated on March 31, 1959, and the equipment was removed in 1971. The location is now Battle Point Park, administered by the Bainbridge Island Metro Park & Recreation District.

Over the years, some of the buildings have been converted into homes, and the area, the parade ground of the community of Fort Ward has been designated a National Historic Site. Many of the homes are also listed on the City of Bainbridge Island's Historic Register.
