= Alki–Manchester ferry =

Defunct ferry route in Washington state

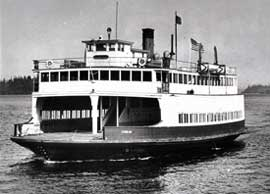
- Motor ferry Crosline in Canadian service.
- Waterway: Puget Sound
- Route: Alki Point – Manchester, Washington
- Began operation: 1925
- Ended operation: 1936
- Travel time: 25 minutes

The Alki–Manchester ferry was a ferry route in Washington State that from 1925 to 1936 ran between Alki Point and Manchester, Washington, across Puget Sound.

== History ==
Ferry service on the Alki Beach–Manchester route was inaugurated on April 12, 1925, by Crosby Direct Line Ferry Co. The Crosby Line intended to mount a challenge to the then dominant ferry companies on Puget Sound, which were the Puget Sound Navigation Company (PSN) and Kitsap County Transportation Co. (KCTC). The Crosby line procured a ferry route certificate from the state of Washington, built a dock at each terminus, and placed the new wooden-hulled double-ended motor ferry Crosline (151 ft (46.02 m) long, 466 tons) on the route. The dock on the Alki end was roughly at the west end of today's Alki Beach Park.

A rate war ensued between the Crosby Line on one side, and PSN and KCTC on the other. The Alki–Manchester route was the shortest distance across the Sound, and this gave a competitive advantage to the Crosby Line, which forced sharp cuts in the rates of PSN and KCTC.

=== Termination of service ===
The rate war ended in early 1926, when PSN bought the Crosby line. PSN continued the route until 1935 when the Alki dock washed out. Service on the route to Manchester was then shifted to Colman Dock as the Seattle starting point of the route.

In May 1934, during the strike of the Ferryboatmen's union, the Alki–Manchester route was one of only three that maintained a regular schedule.
