= SeaBus =

Ferry service in Metro Vancouver

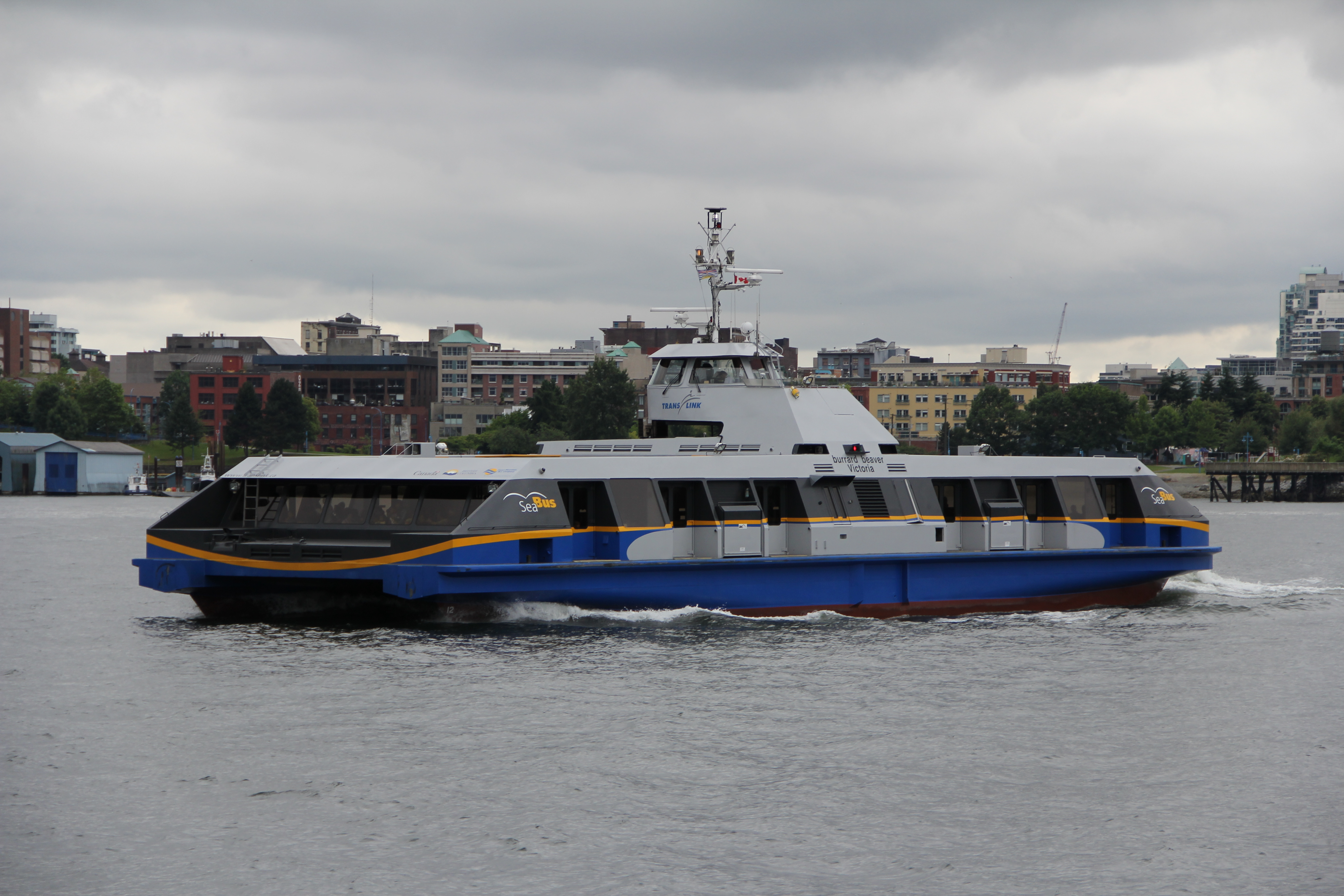
- Locale: Metro Vancouver, British Columbia
- Waterway: Burrard Inlet
- Transit type: Passenger ferry
- Owner: TransLink
- Operator: Coast Mountain Bus Company
- Began operation: June 17, 1977; 48 years ago
- System length: 3.24 km (1.75 nmi; 2.01 mi)
- No. of lines: 1
- No. of vessels: 4
- No. of terminals: 2
- Daily ridership: 14,000 (weekdays, Q1 2026)
- Yearly ridership: 5,606,400 (2025)
Route map
SeaBus highlighted in brown

The SeaBus is a passenger-only ferry service in Metro Vancouver, British Columbia, Canada. It crosses Burrard Inlet to connect the cities of Vancouver (at Waterfront station) and North Vancouver (at Lonsdale Quay). Owned by TransLink and operated by the Coast Mountain Bus Company, the SeaBus forms an important part of the region's integrated public transportation system. In 2025, the SeaBus had a ridership of 5,606,400, or about 14,000 per weekday as of the first quarter of 2026.

== Service ==
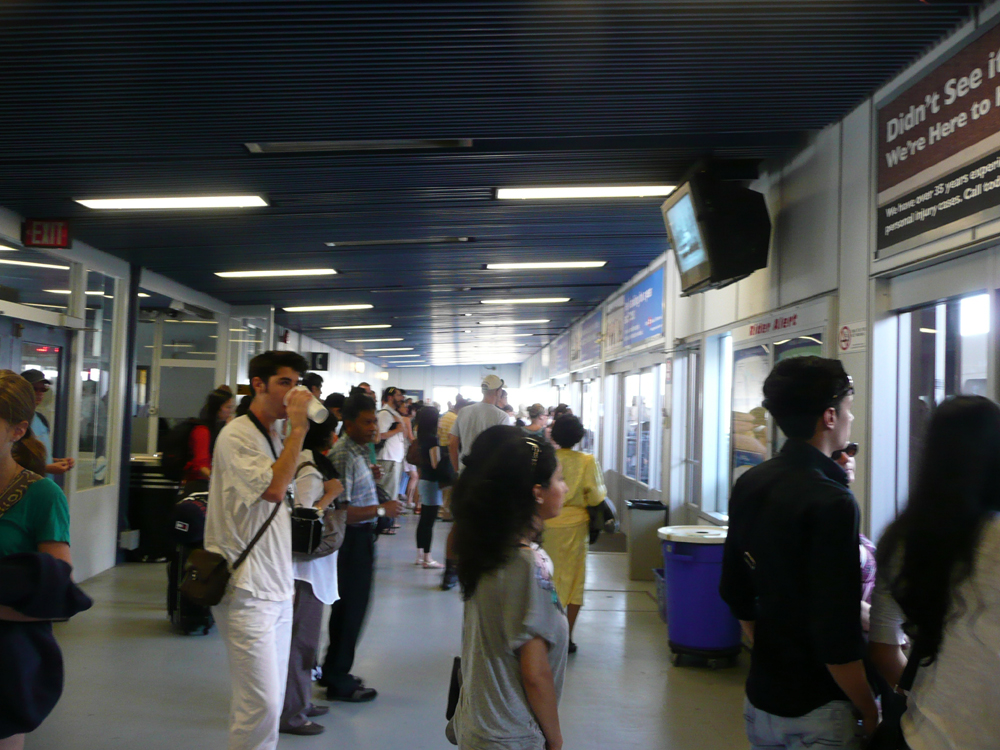
Waiting hall at the Lonsdale Quay SeaBus terminal

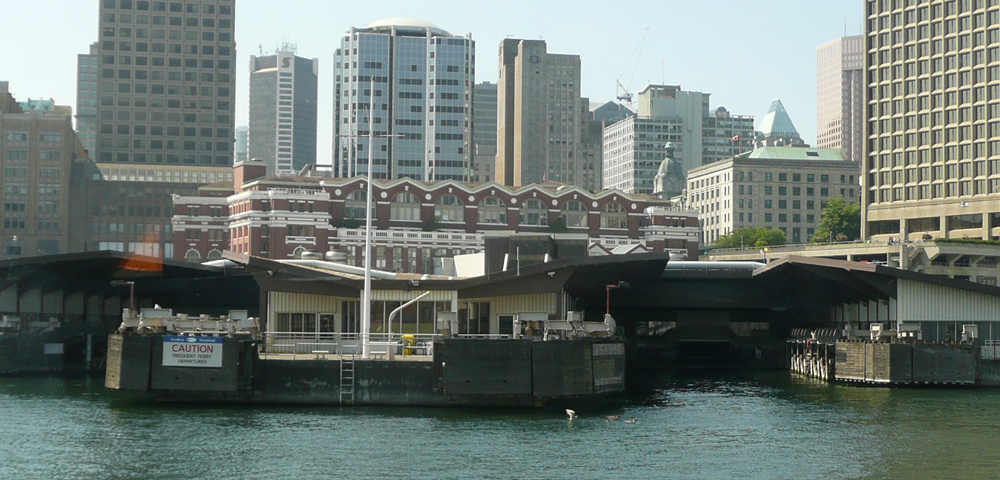
Waterfront Station SeaBus terminal

The SeaBus fleet currently consists of four vessels, with the most recent ship—the MV Burrard Chinook—entering service July 22, 2021. The ferries operate between approximately 6:00 am and 1:00 am from Monday to Saturday, and between 8:00 am and 11:30 pm on Sundays and holidays. During the daytime, two ferries are in service, with the two ferries departing simultaneously from opposite termini and passing each other halfway. The 1.75-nautical-mile (3.24 km) crossing takes 10 to 12 minutes in each direction with a cruising speed of 11.5 knots (21.3 km/h), with a 3 to 5 minute turnaround and, therefore, operates on a 15-minute turn-around schedule. At these times, over 50 crossings are made a day. During the evenings (after 9:00 pm) and early Saturday mornings (until 7:00 am), service is reduced to a 30-minute schedule with only one ferry operating. In 2017, the SeaBus carried over 17,000 riders on average per weekday and transported an estimated 5.84 million people between Vancouver and the North Shore of Burrard Inlet.

The SeaBus is capable of operating on a 12-minute turnaround (down to 10 minutes with simultaneous loading and unloading). However, at the higher speeds, the wake created disturbs other users of the Burrard Inlet. During overloads, it is sometimes operated at the higher speeds.

The ferries operate with four crew members on board (captain and first mate on the bridge and two attendants on the passenger level) and engineers who stay ashore most of the time, but do regular checks of the engines and are available to come aboard at any time. SeaBus crew members are trained and certified to deal with marine emergencies, and will give directions to passengers in the unlikely event of an emergency.

The original emergency procedure involved using the other SeaBus to evacuate passengers from the distressed vessel. Although the viability of this had been demonstrated, Transport Canada became concerned about this approach during times that the other vessel may not be available and has recently mandated the addition of life rafts.

The turnstiles on the entrance into the SeaBus waiting area are used only for counting the number of passengers boarding. If the maximum number is reached, the turnstiles lock and no more passengers are allowed to board the vessel.

=== Fares ===
SeaBus is a "Fare Paid Zone", similar to SkyTrain and buses, wherein passengers are required to possess a valid fare. Fare inspections are performed by transit security officers and on occasion by members of the Metro Vancouver Transit Police. SeaBus attendants may check fares but do not conduct enforcement. SeaBus attendants can call transit security to deal with non-compliant passengers. Failure to pay the correct fare or retain a valid fare may result in being removed from the terminal or fined $173.

== Terminals ==
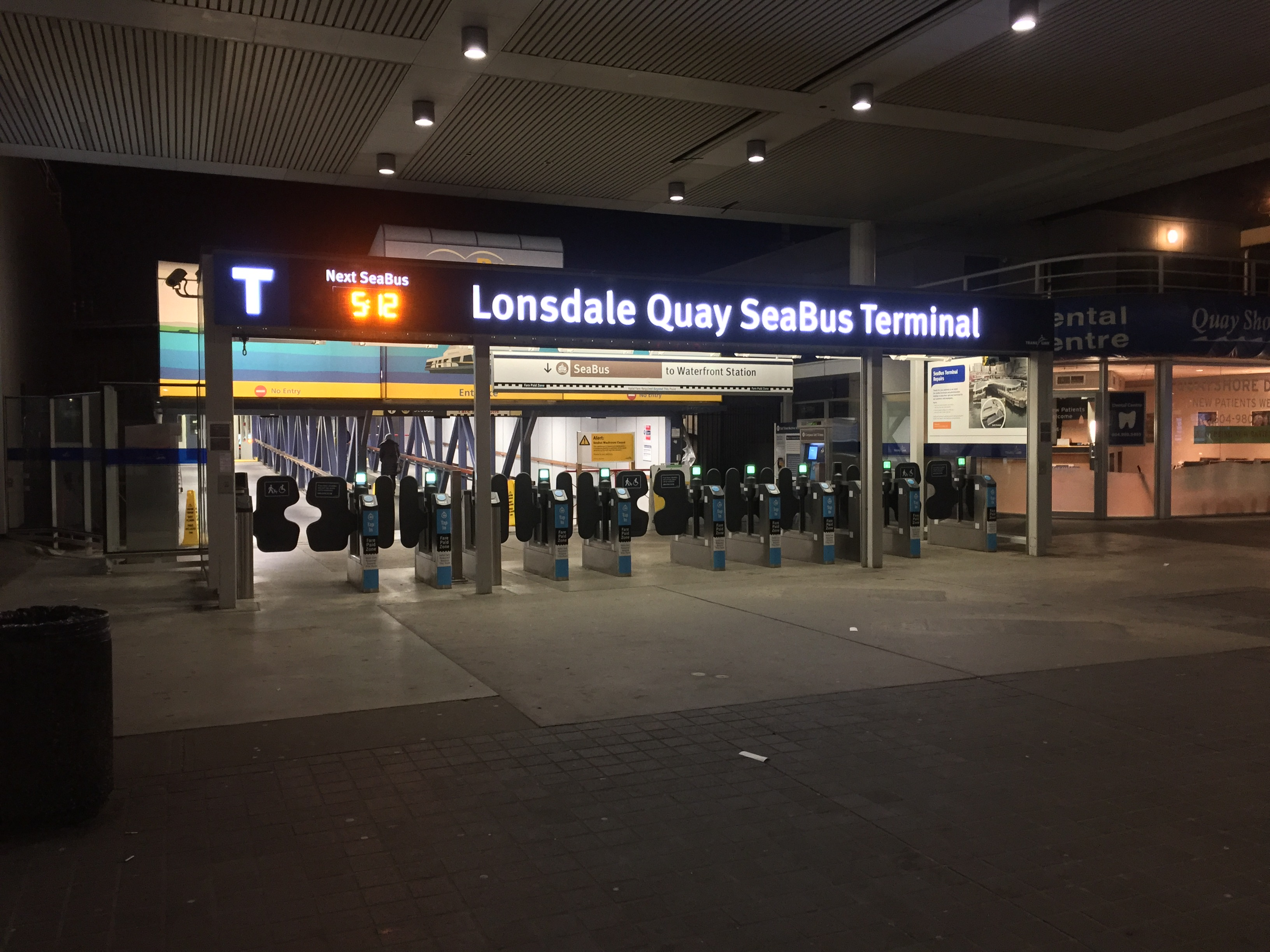
Entrance to the Charles A. Spratt SeaBus Terminal at Lonsdale Quay

The SeaBus stops on the Vancouver side at Waterfront Station, near the Vancouver Convention Centre and the cruise ship terminal at Canada Place. A skywalk connects the SeaBus terminal to the main station building, where passengers can transfer to the West Coast Express and two lines of the SkyTrain system (Expo Line and Canada Line). In 2018, a seismic and accessibility upgrade of the Waterfront terminal began, which included escalator replacements and the construction of a new staircase to improve foot traffic flow.

In North Vancouver, the SeaBus stops at the purpose-built Lonsdale Quay, which features an adjacent bus loop; together they form a major transit hub for Vancouver's North Shore municipalities. In addition to serving commuters, Lonsdale Quay has become an important tourist destination, with a hotel and public market. In 1989, the North Vancouver terminal was designated the "Charles A. Spratt SeaBus Terminal", in honour of Charles Spratt, Project Manager of the SeaBus project from conception to launch, and Marine Manager of the system until his retirement in 1988.

Each terminal consists of two docks surrounded by an E-shaped structure: passengers board from the central waiting hall, which is separated into two waiting areas (each serving one dock) by partitions and turnstiles, and disembark onto a side platform (a Spanish solution).

== Ferries ==
The current SeaBus fleet consists of the following vessels:

Vessel	Year of construction (location)	Capacity	Status	Exterior	Interior
MV Burrard Otter	1976 (Vancouver)	385	Retired – December 2016		
MV Burrard Beaver	1976 (Victoria)	385	In use		Similar to Burrard Otter
MV Burrard Pacific Breeze	2009 (Victoria)	385	In use		
MV Burrard Otter II	2014 (Singapore)	385	In use	(similar to Burrard Pacific Breeze)	(similar to Burrard Chinook)
MV Burrard Chinook	2019 (Netherlands)	385	In use		

The ferries are catamarans constructed out of aluminium, which was quite rare when the initial two crafts were constructed in the 1970s. The ferries are double-ended so that they can travel in either direction without turning around. There are four diesel engines in each vessel, one for each propeller. The propulsion system uses a marine version of the same diesel engine used to power many of the diesel buses on the transit system. The ferries can operate with only three engines if required. The ferries are equipped with radar, allowing them to operate in dense fog.

The third vessel, the Burrard Pacific Breeze, began service in December 2009, and TransLink operated all three ferries during the 2010 Winter Olympics. TransLink originally planned to provide regular three-vessel service by 2011 by overhauling and refitting both the Burrard Otter and the Burrard Beaver following the games to extend their service life for an additional twenty years. However, citing the lack of funding, the agency announced in 2009 it planned to upgrade only one of the original vessels and retire the other one; another new ferry will be commissioned instead if funding becomes available in the future.

TransLink resumed two-vessel service in March 2010, mostly using the Burrard Beaver and the Burrard Pacific Breeze, with the Burrard Otter being used as a substitute. At that point the agency announced its intention to keep all three vessels in the expectation that funding becomes available for three-vessel service in the future.

In late 2012, TransLink announced it had selected Damen Group of the Netherlands to build the fourth SeaBus vessel, the MV Burrard Chinook; the project was expected to cost approximately $25 million. The new vessel was expected to enter service in the fourth quarter of 2014, at which point the Burrard Beaver would become a spare vessel and the Burrard Otter would be retired. Construction on the fourth SeaBus was delayed until November 2017, at which point the project cost had grown to $32.2 million. In September 2019, TransLink announced the Chinook would not enter service until mid-2020. It ultimately entered service on July 22, 2021.

Before the Chinook entered service, there used to be no spare ferries, and all refits and upgrades were done during a long weekend when the half-hour service could be maintained with one vessel. Engine replacements and minor refits can be done during the system downtime overnight. Despite running for over 35 years, the two original ships were rarely taken out of service for maintenance, boasting a service reliability of over 99.9%.

=== Fuel efficiency ===
The Vancouver SeaBus uses 83 kilowatt-hours per vehicle-kilometre, at a speed of 13.5 kilometres per hour. When full (i.e. when seating 400 people), the energy used is 0.21 kilowatt-hours per passenger-kilometre.

=== Livery ===
The colour scheme of SeaBus has changed at least three times since opening in 1977. From launch until 1985, both the Burrard Otter and the Burrard Beaver were painted a bright orange colour in order to make them highly visible to other ships and tugs using the harbour, since the SeaBus route crosses the path of other traffic. To accommodate Vancouver's Expo 86, the city's then-transit authority BC Transit changed the design scheme to white with one red and one blue stripe as well as a BC flag label, matching SeaBus with the then newly built SkyTrain system and newly ordered bus fleet. This remained until the 1999/2000 handover of BC Transit to Metro Vancouver's present transportation administration, TransLink. The paint scheme has since been white (or grey) with blue and golden yellow strips across the sides of the ferries.

Rather than using the standard livery, the Burrard Chinook is wrapped in art illustrating the lifecycle of the Chinook salmon, designed by Indigenous artists from the Musqueam Indian Band, the Squamish Nation, and the Tsleil-Waututh First Nation.

== Ridership ==
TransLink SeaBus ridership by year
Year	2016	2017	2018	2019	2020	2021	2022
Trips (millions)	5.4	5.8	6.2	6.3	2.3 (Note: Represents a significant ridership decrease from prior years owing to the impact of the COVID-19 pandemic on public transport.)	2.6	4.2
View chart definition.

TransLink ridership by mode, 2024
Mode	Trips	% of total	View chart definition.
SkyTrain	149,066,500	37.00	View chart definition.
West Coast Express	1,559,100	0.39	View chart definition.
SeaBus	5,398,900	1.34	View chart definition.
Bus	246,877,500	61.30	View chart definition.
Total	402,902,000 (Note: Represents a significant ridership decrease compared to pre-2020 levels owing to the impact of the COVID-19 pandemic on public transport.)	100.00	View chart definition.

== History ==
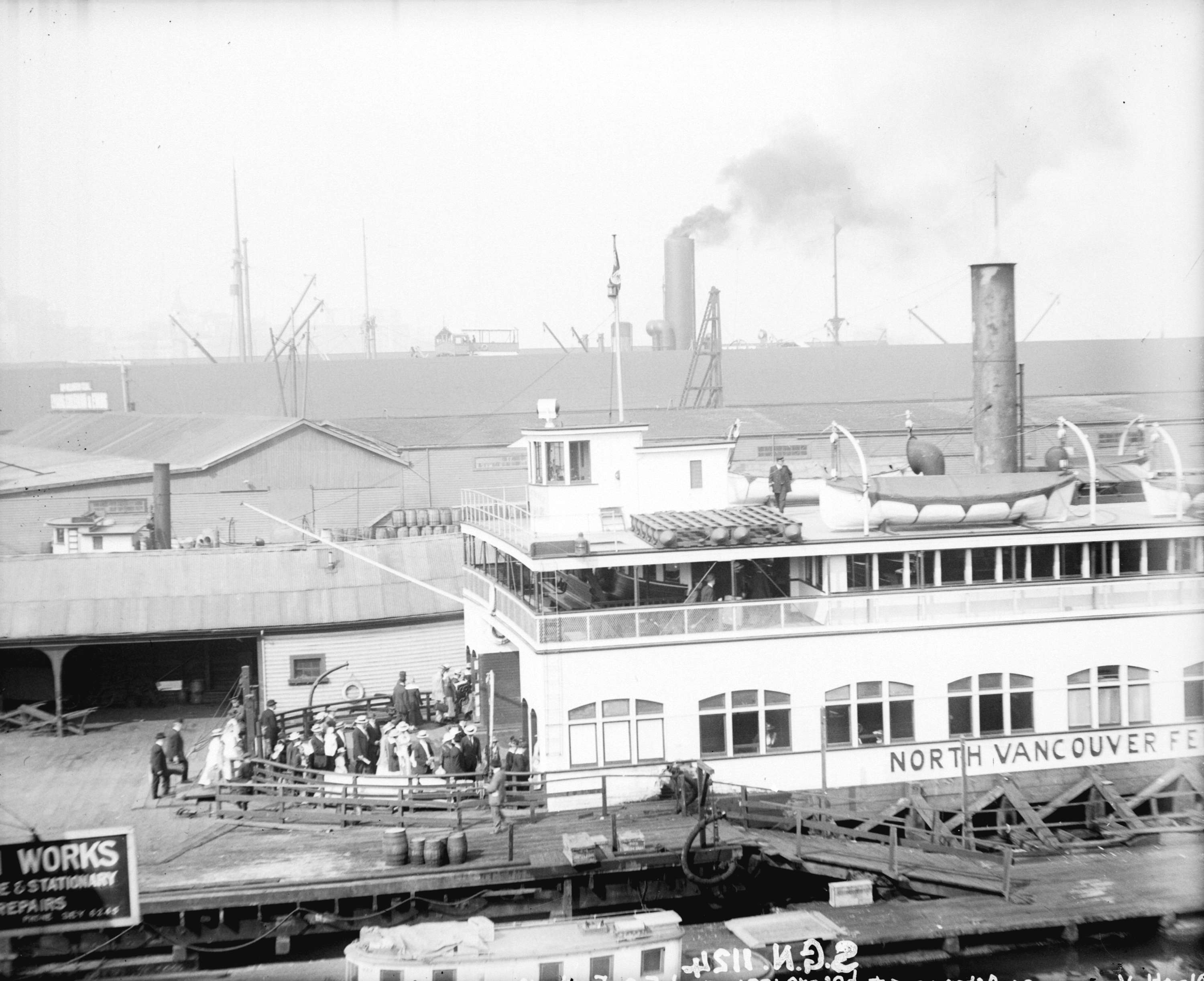
Passengers boarding a North Vancouver Ferry at the Vancouver dock

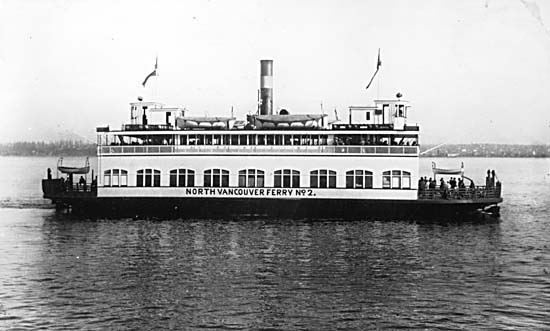
North Vancouver Ferry No. 2

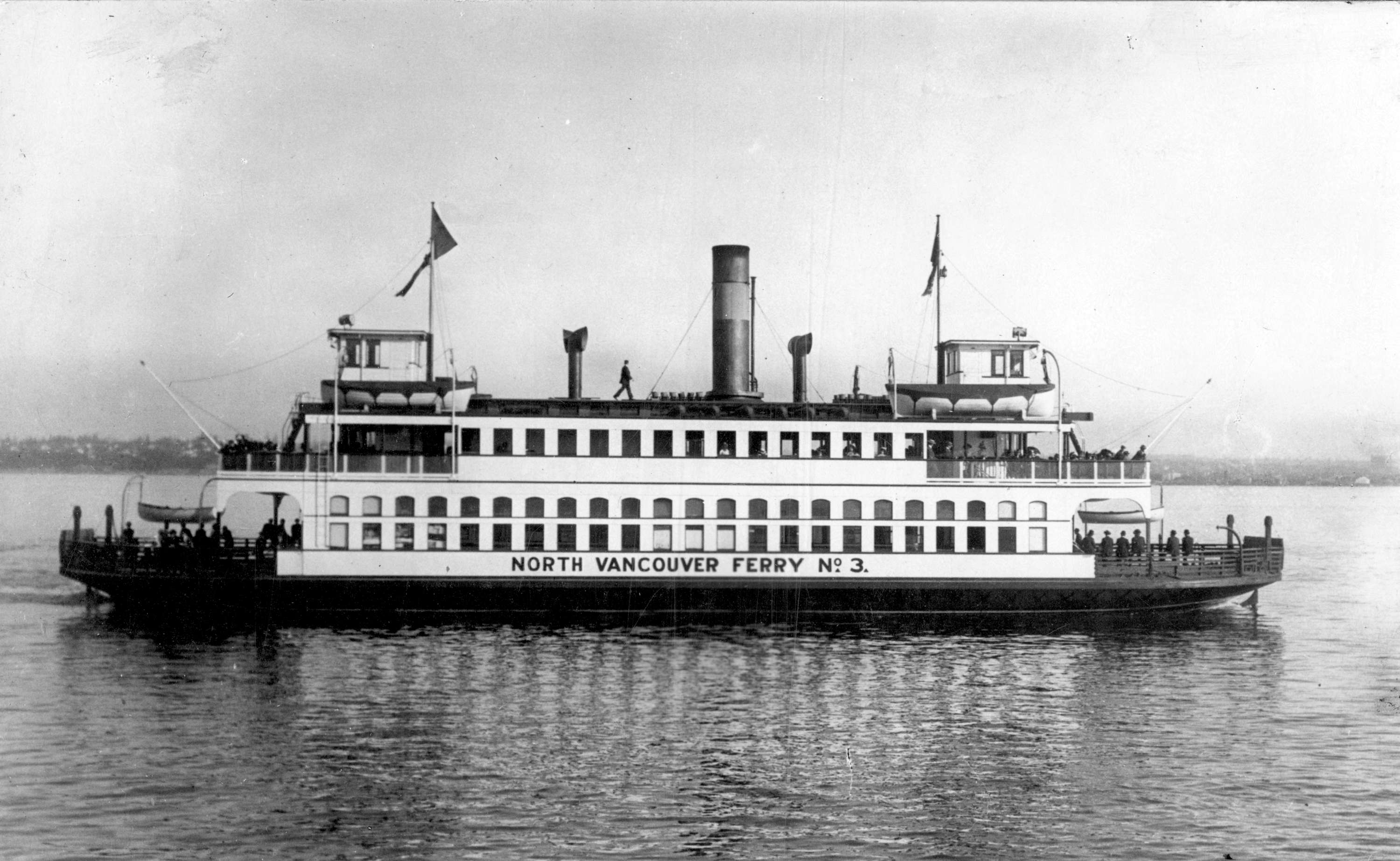
North Vancouver Ferry No. 3

The first regular service between the City of North Vancouver and Vancouver began in 1900 with the craft North Vancouver. Three years later, the North Vancouver Ferry and Power Company was created, took over the existing service, and built a new craft called St. George. These two ferries were later renamed North Vancouver Ferry No. 1 and North Vancouver Ferry No. 2. The City of North Vancouver took over the service in 1908 to provide a more reliable ferry connection with Downtown Vancouver. Soon after, another craft, North Vancouver Ferry No. 3, was built. In 1936, the No. 2 was retired and used as a logging camp on the west coast of Vancouver Island until it was destroyed by fire.

In 1938, the Lions Gate Bridge was completed, which significantly reduced demand for ferry service. However, there was an increase in demand with the onset of World War II because of the shipbuilding boom in North Vancouver. This growth in business spurred the creation of a new ferry, the North Vancouver Ferry No. 5, in 1941. The MV Crosline was also leased from Washington to meet demand. According to James Barr, 1943 was the busiest year that North Vancouver Ferries had, ferrying over 7 million passengers across the Burrard Inlet.

North Vancouver No. 5 was built in Coal Harbour by Boeing Shipyards in 1941. It ran faithfully with its Union Diesel until 1958 when it was tied up at the foot of Lonsdale Ave along with North Vancouver Ferry No. 4. Jesse Oliver Kinnie, a North Vancouver Ferry employee, looked into the possibility of purchasing North Vancouver Ferry No. 4 and running it on the same route as it had run all its life. It had a higher height clearance on the car deck than Ferry No. 5 and was faster. The numbers did not add up and the plan was abandoned. Ferry No. 4 also ran on a Union Diesel.

The ferries were in major decline by the 1950s. In 1948, the No. 3 was taken off of regular service and was sold in 1953. The cost of operating the ferries was high, and the last sailing by the No. 4 ferry took place on August 30, 1958. The No. 4 was later sold to be used in Prince Rupert. Later, No. 4 returned to Vancouver and was tied up on the Vancouver side of Burrard Inlet. It was in desperate need of a refit and had to be kept afloat with pumps to keep the water out of its hull. When the power failed and the pumps stopped it went to the bottom of the inlet. The No. 5 was converted into the Seven Seas Restaurant at the foot of Lonsdale in North Vancouver. It remained there until 2002 when the City of North Vancouver and the federal courts had it demolished after a long-standing dispute over who would be responsible if it sank and concern that the hull was in danger of imminent collapse. In dry dock it proved to be quite sound, but at that point the decision had already been made to scrap it.

There were plans in the 1960s to build a tunnel under Burrard Inlet which would have connected to the proposed freeways on the Vancouver side. After the freeway plans in Vancouver were cancelled, the tunnel proposal was also abandoned, and the money originally slated for that project was instead redirected to re-establishing a passenger ferry service between Vancouver and the North Shore. The ferry proposal was included in a 1975 report by the Greater Vancouver Regional District, and the current SeaBus ferries began operating the Waterfront Station–Lonsdale Quay route on June 17, 1977, initially as part of the Transportation Division of BC Hydro. For the first few years of service, the automated fare machines (the first in Vancouver's transit system) at the two SeaBus terminals printed an impression of the rider's coins onto a cash register-style receipt, which could become very long if fares were paid in small-denomination coins such as pennies.
