= Rolling Bay, Bainbridge Island, Washington =

Township on Bainbridge Island, WA

Rolling Bay is a small community on Bainbridge Island, located on the north-eastern side of the island.

Rolling Bay was originally named Falk's Bay when first claimed by early settler Dona Falk in 1876. On April 6, 1892, the first post office was established in the area, with the local population changing the name to Rollins Bay, after a local beach-squatter-turned-postmaster. However, locals soon complained that name was too closely tied to the objectionable antics of Rollins himself, so the name was officially changed to Rolling Bay soon after.

Rolling Bay is one of the island's oldest summer colonies, characterized by its plethora of beach homes and small farms. The area has deep agricultural and industrial ties, and served as a hub for the booming logging, shipbuilding, and berry industries from the late 19th to mid-20th century. The community was designated as its own township until February 28, 1991, when the entire island was annexed to become a singular city.

== Geography ==
Rolling Bay is characterized by its close proximity to beaches and the ocean. Rolling Bay Walk and Manitou Beach, as well as the greater Murden Cove, offer scenic views of the adjacent Seattle skyline and Puget Sound. Ted Olsen Nature Preserve, bordering Kallgren Road to the east and Madison Avenue to the west, is a 15 acre forested park with a branching trail system. Rolling Bay is situated approximately 171 feet above sea level at its highest point.

== Notable Establishments ==
=== Bud Hawk Post Office ===
The Rolling Bay post office was renamed The Bud Hawk Post Office on February 26, 2010. Bud Hawk grew up in Rolling Bay, becoming a decorated World War II veteran and earning the Medal of Honor and four Purple Hearts while fighting in Europe as a U.S. Army machine-gunner. After the war and until his death, he was a longtime Kitsap County educator.

=== Puget Sound Naval Academy / Fieldstone of Bainbridge ===
Located just west of Skiff Point lies the former building of the Puget Sound Naval Academy. Originally opened as the Moran School, a private boarding institute for boys, the building was sold in 1938 to be used as training grounds for students of the United States Naval Academy at Annapolis and the United States Coast Guard Academy at New London, Connecticut. The academy shuttered its doors in 1951, but most of the original buildings still stand today, with them now serving as Fieldstone of Bainbridge, an elderly mental care facility.

=== Bay Hay & Feed ===
Bay Hay and Feed, a local general store serving the area, was established in 1979, when original owners Howard Block and Ce-Ann Parker purchased the circa-1912 Rodal Building located on the intersection of Valley and Sunrise drive. Block and Parker had previously operated a natural-food store in New Hampshire. They initially envisioned Bay Hay as a New England-style general store selling hay, grain, tools, and farm supplies. Drawing on their horticultural backgrounds, they later expanded the business to include a greenhouse, plants, and organic gardening supplies while restoring the historic building. During the 1980s, the store became known for its multicolored Bay Hay T-shirts, featuring rows of farm animals. The shirts became locally popular and were worn and photographed by customers while traveling around the world. Over the following decades, Bay Hay developed into both a retail business and a community gathering place in the Rolling Bay neighborhood.

In January 2022, Block and Parker retired after more than 40 years of operating the business. Ownership passed to Els, Jeff, Devin, and Nick, a Bainbridge Island family with longstanding connections to the founders.

=== Rolling Bay Winery ===
Rolling Bay Winery originally began as a group of winery amateurs established in 1992 by Alphonse de Klerk, a local. The Winery itself was formally established in 2007 by de Klerk, David Verwolf, and Piero Sandri. Since its inception, the winery produces just over 2,000 cases a year, and has been highlighted by organizations such as Seattle Magazine and Seattle Met for its product.

=== Other Establishments ===
Rolling Bay is home to several restaurants and cafes, including Via Rosa 11, Briny Bagels and The Rolling Bay Cafe. Rolling Bay Automotive has served the area since 1997. Rolling Bay Presbyterian church has been an anchor of the community since its opening in 1909, and is known for its "Bethlehem Experience", a drive-through nativity scene depicting the birth story of Jesus Christ each December.

Bud Hawk Post Office

Photos of Bud hawk Post Office

Rolling Bay Walk

- List of Bainbridge Island communities
