= Battle Point, Bainbridge Island, Washington =

Coordinates: 47°39′46″N 122°35′19″W

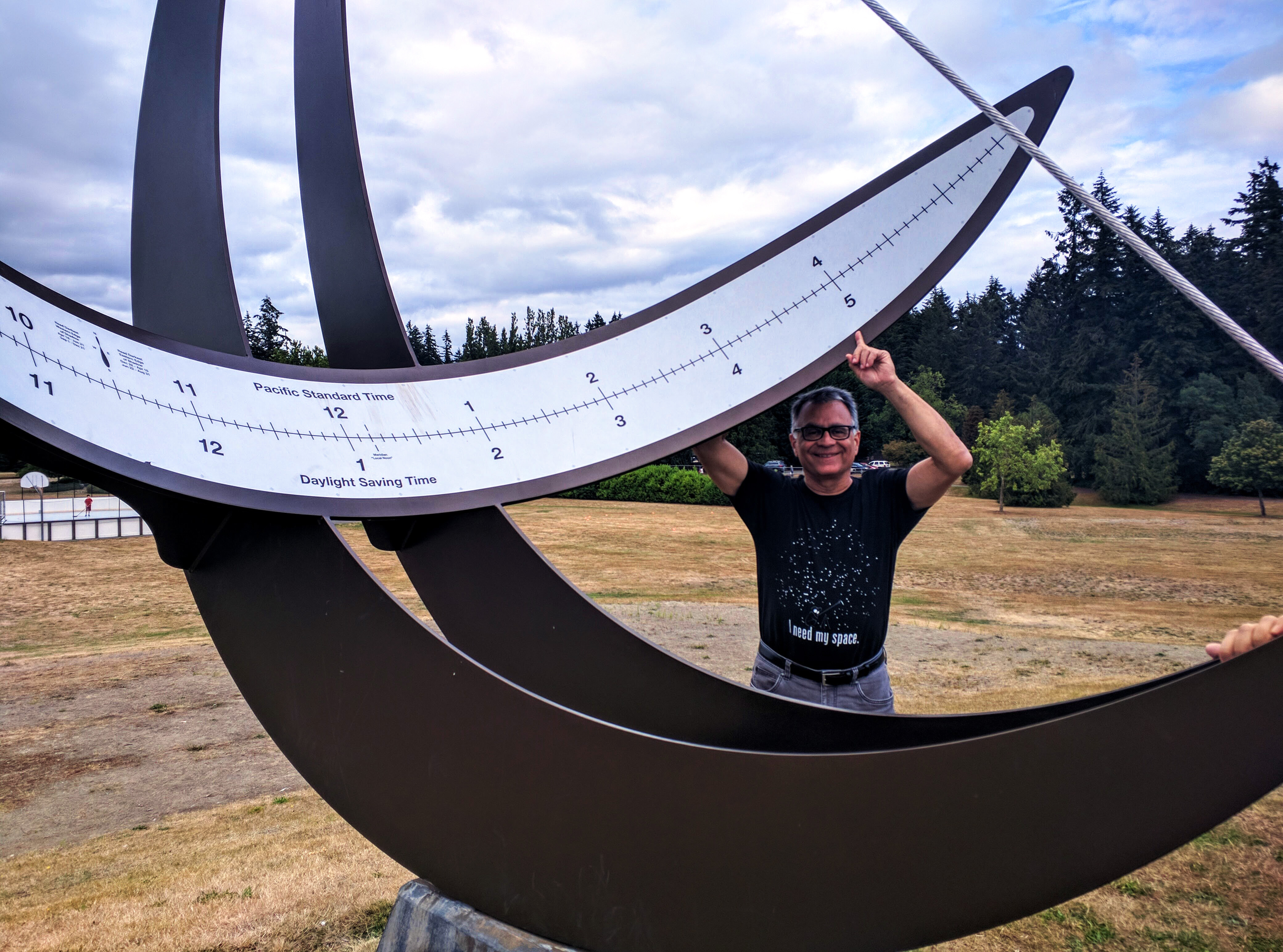
The equatorial sundial at Battle Point Park, Bainbridge Island, Washington, being admired by Fred Sammartino

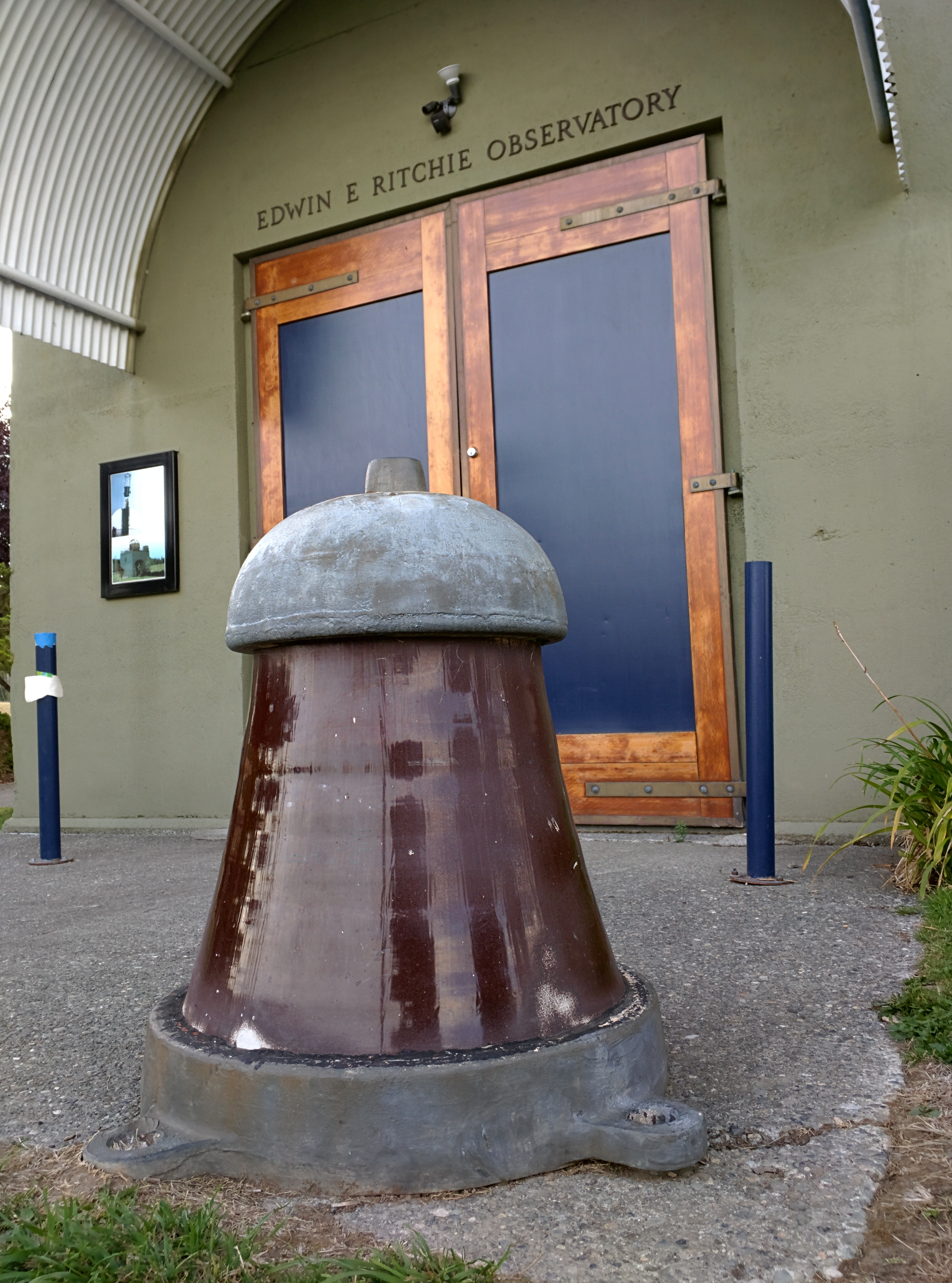
The Edwin E. Ritchie Observatory front door, with an insulator from the original extremely low frequency transmitter that was in that location during WWII for communicating with American submarines

Battle Point is a community of Bainbridge Island, Washington, located on the western side of the island. The northern part of the neighborhood extends to Arrow Point. Battle Point also contains the communities of Tolo and Venice.

The large Battle Point Park is in this neighborhood. It includes the Edwin E. Ritchie Observatory, the John H. Rudolph Planetarium, the Battle Point Astronomical Association sundial, sports fields, gardens, horse corral, play structure, and other features.

Battle Point is named for a battle in which the local Suquamish tribe under chief Kitsap fought off a band of marauders from the north. Arrow Point, forming the western shore of Manzanita Bay, is named for its sharply pointed shape.

== See also ==
- List of Bainbridge Island communities
