= Rich Passage =

Tidal strait in Puget Sound in Washington, USA

Coordinates: 47.595°N 122.555°W

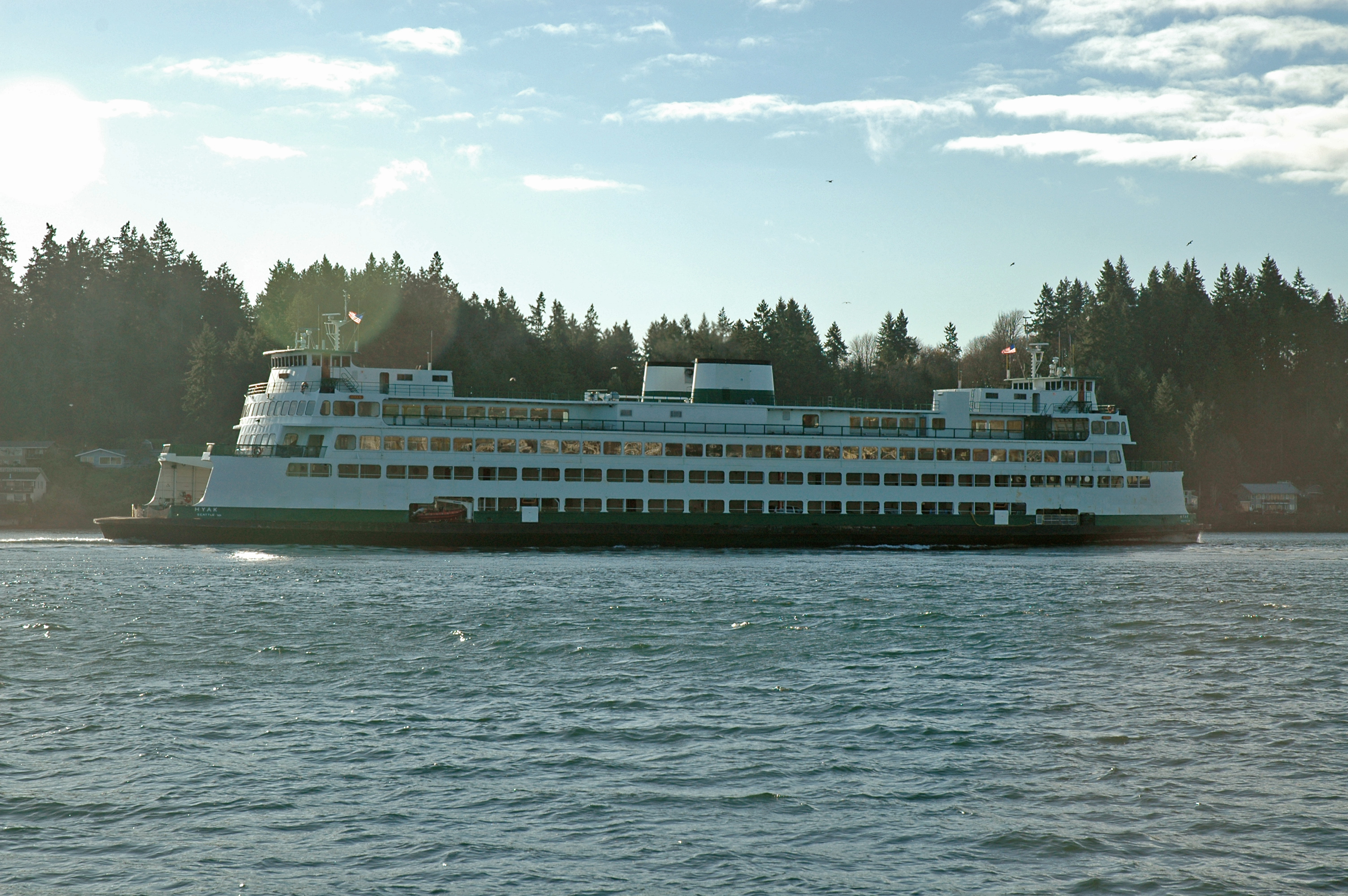
The Washington State ferry Hyak in Rich Passage heading to Bremerton, Washington.

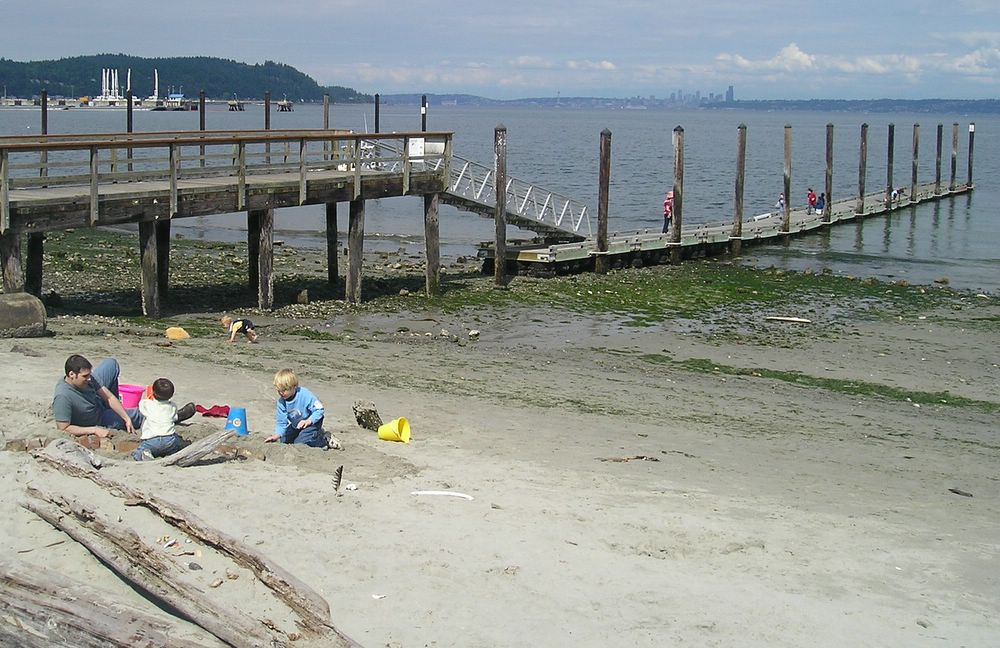
The east end of Rich Passage, from a Manchester beach

Rich Passage is a tidal strait in Puget Sound, allowing access to Bremerton, Washington, the Puget Sound Naval Shipyard, Sinclair Inlet, and Dyes Inlet. It separates Bainbridge Island from the Manchester area of Kitsap Peninsula. The Seattle–Bremerton ferry, part of the Washington State Ferries, travels the length of Rich Passage on its route.

In addition to the many ferry trips each way per day, tugs with hawser tows and various types of naval and recreational craft all contribute to a considerable collision hazard.

Fort Ward Park and Manchester State Park are located on the Rich Passage waterfront.

Rich Passage was named by Charles Wilkes during the Wilkes Expedition of 1838–1842, to honor William Rich, the expedition's botanist.
