= Creosote, Bainbridge Island, Washington =

Community in Washington, United States

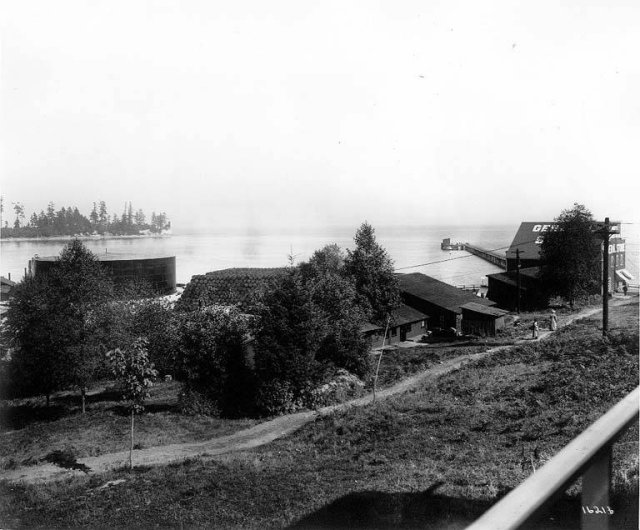
- Structures and a road at Creosote, Washington, sometime before 1930
- Interactive map of Creosote, Bainbridge Island, Washington
- Coordinates: 47°36′52.7″N 122°30′14.3″W
- Country: United States
- State: Washington
- County: Kitsap
- City: Bainbridge Island

Creosote was a community of Bainbridge Island, Washington, along Eagle Harbor. The area is directly visible from the downtown Bainbridge Island community of Winslow. Originally named Eagle Harbor in 1886, in 1908 the name was changed to Creosote because of the manufacturing and application of creosote at the now-defunct Wyckoff Company plant in the area. "The largest industry on Bainbridge Island was the Wyckoff Company wood-treating plant on the south shore at the entrance to Eagle Harbor, which began operations in 1903", according to a US government document. The former industrial site is to the north of the community of Bill Point and east of the community of Eagledale at the southern side of the entrance to Eagle Harbor.

== Restoration ==
The site is now the city-owned Pritchard Park and is undergoing Superfund clean-up.

== See also ==
- List of Bainbridge Island communities
