= Siletzia =

Rock formation that forms the basement rock of the southern Pacific Northwest coast

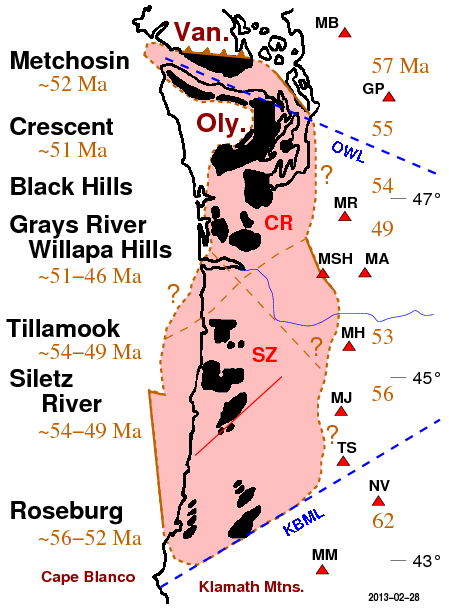
Siletzia, from Vancouver Island (Van) to the Klamath Mountains in Oregon. The shaded area shows near-surface extent as inferred from magnetic and gravitational studies (Silberling et al. 1987; Wells, Weaver & Blakely 1998), divided into the Crescent (CR) and Siletz (SZ) terranes; the crossed dashed lines are alternate locations of CR-SZ boundary. Outcrops (with names) in black; ages (in red, Ma = millions of years) on the left are from McCrory & Wilson (2013b, fig. 1), ages on right are from Duncan (1982, fig. 2). The blue line is the Columbia River (Washington—Oregon boundary), the red line is the Corvallis—Waldo Hills fault, the dashed blue lines are the Olympic–Wallowa Lineament (OWL) and Klamath—Blue Mountains Lineament (KBML), and the red triangles are the main Cascades Volcanoes. Modified from figure by Duncan (1982). Grays River Volcanics and later parts of the Tillamook Volcanics are now considered post-Siletzian. (Chan, Tepper & Nelson 2012)

Siletzia is a massive formation of early to middle Eocene epoch marine basalts and interbedded sediments in the forearc of the Cascadia subduction zone, on the west coast of North America. It forms the basement rock under western Oregon and Washington and the southern tip of Vancouver Island. It is now fragmented into the Siletz and Crescent terranes.

Siletzia corresponds geographically to the Coast Range Volcanic Province (or Coast Range basalts), but is distinguished from slightly younger basalts that erupted after Siletzia accreted to the continent and differ in chemical composition. The Siletzia basalts are tholeiitic, a characteristic of mantle-derived magma erupted from a spreading ridge between plates of oceanic crust. The younger basalts are alkalic or calc-alkaline, characteristic of magmas derived from a subduction zone. This change of composition reflects a change from marine to continental volcanism that becomes evident around 48 to 42 Ma (millions of years ago), and is attributed to the accretion of Siletzia against the North American continent.

Various theories have been proposed to account for the volume and diversity of Siletzian magmatism, as well as the approximately 75° of rotation, but the evidence is insufficient to determine Siletzia's origin; the question remains open.

The accretion of Siletzia against the North American continent approximately 50 million years ago (contemporaneous with the initiation of the bend in the Hawaiian-Emperor seamount chain) was a major tectonic event associated with a reorganization of Earth's tectonic plates. This is believed to have a caused a shift in the subduction zone, termination of the Laramide orogeny that was uplifting the Rocky Mountains, and major changes in tectonic and volcanic activity across much of western North America.

== Exposures and discovery ==
The rock of Siletzia has been exposed in various places by tectonic uplift (as around the periphery of the Olympic Mountains), anticlinal folding (such as the Black Hills and Willapa Hills in southwestern Washington), and overthrusting onto other formations (along various faults in central and southern Oregon). These exposures have been variously named the Metchosin Formation of Vancouver Island, the Crescent Formation, Black Hills Formation (Washington), and Willapa Hills volcanics of Washington, and the Siletz River Volcanics and Roseburg Formation of Oregon. (See map. The Grays River Volcanics of Washington and Tillamook Volcanics of Oregon are now considered post-Siletz.) Elsewhere Siletzia is covered by younger volcanic and sedimentary deposits.

The discovery of Siletzia began in 1906 with Arnold's description and naming of a small exposure on the north side of the Olympic Peninsula near Port Crescent, Washington. Though this exposure is small, he recognized as very likely that much more of it was buried under younger deposits. With recognition that similar rock exposed at other outcrops is part of the same formation, the name Crescent Formation is now generally applied to all early and middle Eocene basalts on the Olympic Peninsula and Puget lowlands.

The Metchosin Igneous Complex at the southern tip of Vancouver Island was described in a series of reports (1910, 1912, 1913, 1917) by Clapp, who recognized it as correlative with the Crescent formation on the other side of the Strait of Juan de Fuca. Weaver recognized that these "Metchosin volcanics" included various Eocene basalts in western Washington and the Oregon Coast Range as far south as the Klamath Mountains. The Siletz River Volcanics was described in 1948 by Snavely and Baldwin after exposures near the Siletz River, Oregon, and the Roseburg and related formations in southern Oregon described in various reports from the 1960s on.

=== Etymology ===
"Siletzia" was coined in 1979 by Irving, (based in turn on the Siletz River and the Siletz Reservation), to describe the full extent of these Eocene basalts and interbedded sedimentary formations.

== Extent ==
The map shows the exposures (black) and inferred near-surface extent (pink) of Siletzia, the latter being what can be detected in the upper crust by aeromagnetic, gravitational, or seismological studies.

There are only two exposed contacts of Siletzia with the older (pre-Cenozoic) North American basement. One is near Roseburg, Oregon, where it is thrust against formations of the Klamath Mountains (discussed below), the other is along the Leech River Fault off the southern end of Vancouver Island, where it has pushed the pre-Cenozoic Pacific Rim formation beneath the Wrangellia Terrane). Everywhere else the contact between Siletzia and the rest of the continent is concealed under younger deposits, especially the Cascade Range volcanics. The contact around the Olympic Mountains is actually the bottom contact with the underlying oceanic sediments, tilted up by the uplift of the Olympics and exposed by erosion of about 10 to 12 km of overlying deposits.

The location of the near-surface contact between the Crescent Formation and the pre-Cenozoic metamorphic basement of the continent — what has been the termed the Coast Range Boundary Fault (CRBF) — is largely uncertain. The Leech River Fault extends southeast past Victoria, B.C. to cross the Strait of Juan de Fuca, possibly connecting with the southeast striking Southern Whidbey Island Fault (SWIF). This extends to the Rattlesnake Mountain Fault Zone (RMFZ), some 25 kilometers east of Seattle, which is believed to be the western edge of the pre-Cenozoic basement. However, gravity data indicates that at this latitude the Crescent Formation (at least near the surface) extends no further east than Seattle.

Further south, near Mount St. Helens, is a similar situation, where the St. Helens Fault Zone (SHZ) is believed to be the eastern edge of the Crescent Formation, but the pre-Cenozoic continental basement is near Mount Rainier. Separating these is the marine sedimentary formation known as the Southern Washington Cascades Conductor (SWCC); it is possible that it was deposited over a fragment of Siletzia. Or not: the oldest parts of the SWCC likely predate Siletzia, and the nature and location of the contact between these two formations is unknown.

In central Oregon, Siletzia forms a platform on which the older, now defunct volcanoes of the Western Cascades rest. The younger High Cascades to the east are believed to rest on sediments that accumulated in the basin between Siletzia and the continent.

In southern Oregon, Siletzia has been thrust against the Mesozoic Klamath Mountains of southern Oregon along the Klamath—Blue Mountain Lineament (KBML). Near Roseburg this contact is exposed at the Wildlife Safari Fault where the Late Jurassic Dothan Formation has been thrust over the Roseburg Formation.

Off the coast of southern Oregon, the western edge of Siletzia is the Eocene Fulmar Fault. This is a strike-slip fault, where part of Siletzia has been split off; the missing piece may be the Yakutat terrane now at the head of the Gulf of Alaska. Further north, the terrane boundary is believed to come ashore near the Columbia River.

The way the Crescent Formation wraps around the Olympic Mountains ("Oly" on the map) may reflect oroclinal bending as a result of being crushed against Vancouver Island. It has also been attributed to loss of the deposits originally overlying the Olympics prior to their uplift, resembling a dome where top and western end has been removed.

Siletzia's actual thickness, and the estimates of that thickness, vary. Under Oregon, the Siletz terrane appears to extend 25 to possibly 35 km into the trough between the subducting Juan de Fuca Plate and the edge of the continent, where it is slipping over sediments accumulated in the bottom of the trough. The Crescent terrane (under Washington) is believed to be thinner, from as little as 12 and 22 km under the western and eastern ends of the Strait of Juan de Fuca, but possibly as much as 20 and 35 km thick.

== Composition ==
The various formations of Siletzia are characterized as marine tholeiitic pillow basalts and volcanic breccia, often interbedded with sedimentary layers of continental origin, lying on oceanic crust. These are usually capped by a layer of alkalic volcanics deposited subaerially. All this suggests these formations were initially deposited in an oceanic environment, possibly as seamounts or an island arc.

On the Olympic Peninsula the Blue Mountain unit at the base of the Crescent Formation includes sediments (including large boulders of quartz diorite) of continental origin, suggesting that the continent was close by; other sediments were eroded from the pre-Cenozoic rock of Vancouver Island and the northern Cascade Range. At the southern end are sediments derived from the Klamath Mountains, while sand of the overlying Tyee Formation has an isotopic composition corresponding to rock of the Idaho Batholith.

== Age ==
Eruption of the Siletzia basalts has been placed roughly in the late Paleocene through the mid Eocene; more specific dates have been difficult to obtain and somewhat variable. Early K-Ar (potassium-argon) and ^{40}Ar-^{39}Ar (argon-argon) radiometric dating by Duncan gave dates of 57 and 62 Ma (million years ago) to the northern and southern ends, and a date of 49 Ma for the Grays River volcanics near the center of Siletzia. This is suggestive of a spreading ridge (as previously noted by McWilliams 1980), and has been a strong constraint on models of how Siletzia formed. Other researchers have since found younger dates (50-48 Ma) for the Crescent basalts, removing much of the age symmetry.

Dating from 2010 based on ^{40}Ar-^{39}Ar, U-Pb (uranium-lead), and coccoliths shows a narrower range of ages from 56 Ma in the south to 50 or 49 Ma in the north. Subsequent high-precision U-Pb dates from northern Siletzia show a narrowly constrained age of 51 Ma for the Metchosin complex on Vancouver Island. Of particular interest is the somewhat broader range of approximately 53 to 48 Ma for Crescent Formation basalts on the east side of the Olympic Peninsula that overlie the Blue Mountain unit, reliably dated at 48 Ma or younger. This structural relationship was previously understood as showing that Siletzia – or at least its northern end – was built on the continental margin. It is now argued that the unconformity of ages can be explained by the Blue Mountain unit being thrust under Siletzia some time after 44.5 Ma, and shows that Siletiza was not necessarily emplaced along the continental margin.

== Size ==
Siletzia is massive: over 400 miles (600 kilometers) long, almost half that much across (and likely further at depth). The original deposits were from 16 to 35 kilometers thick. Weaver, reckoning a minimal thickness of only 3,000 feet, still estimated "nearly 10,000 cubic miles of rock"; he put the total volume to be as great, if not greater, than the better known Columbia River Basalts. Snavely et al., recognizing at least 10,000 feet of thickness, and as much as 20,000 feet under eruptive centers, estimated the volume to be in excess of 50,000 cubic miles (over 200,000 km^{3}). Duncan (1982) estimated around 250,000 km^{3} (about 60,000 cubic miles), which exceeds the volume of most continental rift zones, and some flood basalt provinces. A recent estimate put the volume at 2 million cubic km.

== Paleorotation ==
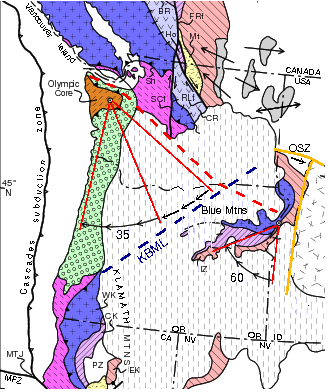
Oregon Rotation: Rotation of Siletzia (green) about a northern pivot point. The Klamath Mountains (blue) rotated with Siletzia, having been formerly adjacent to the Blue Mountains (also blue, and also since rotated) near the Idaho Batholith (right edge). Red dashed line is the Olympic–Wallowa Lineament. Original image courtesy of William R. Dickinson.

When lava solidifies and cools it retains an imprint of the Earth's magnetic field, thus recording how it was oriented. Measurements of such paleomagnetic fields in the Oregon Coast Range show rotations of 46 to 75°, all of it following the presumed accretion to the continent (alternately, formation) of the Siletz terrane at about 50 Ma. These rotations are all clockwise, and show a strong correlation with the age of the rock: about one and a half degrees of rotation per million years. These paleomagnetic rotations and other evidence show that Siletzia — or the part of it constituting the Siletz terrane ("SZ" on map, above), from the Klamath Mountains to the Columbia River — has rotated clockwise as a single, coherent block.

The question of whether Siletzia pivoted about its northern end or southern end has attracted considerable attention, with the evidence long suggesting a northern pivot. A key piece of evidence is that the Crescent Formation is laid over sediments (the Blue Mountain unit) derived from the continent, including boulders of quartz diorite some 65 million years old. This was previously interpreted as requiring the Crescent Formation to have formed close to the continent. However, new high-precision U-Pb dating shows that the overlying basalts are older, and therefore the Blue Mountain unit was not overlaid by the basalts, but thrust under them at a later date. Such under-thrusting implies that the northern end of Siletzia was initially further away from the continent, and permits radial motion about a more southerly or more easterly pivot near the Washington-Oregon border, as recently suggested.

This model has Siletzia forming on the continental margin along what is now the Olympic–Wallowa Lineament (OWL; a zone of topographical features of unknown age and tectonic significance), with the southern end of Siletzia and the Klamath Mountains (joined to Siletzia) near the Idaho Batholith in central Idaho. Further evidence for this comes from the sand of the Tyee Formation that overlie the Roseburg Formation. Not only does this sand have the same isotopic composition of rock in the Idaho Batholith (and of sand now coursing down the Snake and Columbia Rivers), but it appears to have not been transported very far from its source. This implies that the Tyee Formation was much closer to the Idaho Batholith when it was deposited, and subsequently rotated away. Geodetic surveys show that the region continues to rotate, likely as a result of extension of the Basin and Range Province and asthenospheric flow around the southern edge of the subducting Juan de Fuca Plate.

North of the Columbia River, matters are more complicated. First, in southwestern Washington there is only half as much rotation as seen in rocks of similar age in Oregon. This is the basis for believing the Crescent terrane has broken from the Siletz terrane (perhaps because they formed on different oceanic plates), and undergone a different rotational history. Second, in Washington there is more variation in the amount of rotation and more faulting, which has led to a speculation that the Crescent terrane has broken up into eight or nine crustal blocks.

At Bremerton, on the east side of the Olympics, the measured rotations are less, and within the statistical error bounds of being zero; while further north, near Port Townsend, the rotation is slightly counter-clockwise. On Vancouver Island the paleorotations are counter-clockwise, and other evidence shows that the tip of the island has been bent, presumably as a result of the collision of Siletzia. The northwestern tip of the Olympic Peninsula also shows counter-clockwise rotation, of around 45 degrees. This raises a question of how much of the arcuate shape of the Crescent Formation is due to loss of material from the center after uplift by the Olympic Mountains, and how much reflects oroclinal bending.

== Origin ==
Siletzia's origin is not yet determined, and (as of 2017) remains controversial. Theories are still being developed, and even the details the theories depend on "have remained enigmatic". Following are several of the most notable models.

Models of how Siletzia formed are of two general types: (1) Formation well offshore (possibly as seamounts, like the Hawaiian-Emperor seamount chain, or a hotspot at a spreading ridge, like Iceland) and then accretion to the continent; (2) formation inshore, on or near the continental margin (perhaps as a result of transcurrent extension, or of a slab window). All current models then have Siletzia rifting away from the continental edge about a northern pivot.

Studies of Siletzia's origins have generally focused on accounting for two principal observations: the large paleorotation (described above), and the voluminous output (over 50,000 cubic miles, exceeding the volume of most continental rift zones, and some flood basalt provinces). Accounting for the observed volumes of basalt requires an enhanced magmatic source, for which most models invoke either the presence of the Yellowstone hotspot, or slab windows. The latter would have resulted from the subduction of the Kula-Farallon (or possibly Farallon—Resurrection) spreading ridge. The relation with the Kula-Farallon spreading ridge is an important element in all models, though its location through that epoch is not well determined.

=== Simpson & Cox 1977: Two models ===
Seeking to explain the observed clockwise paleorotation, and noting that Siletzia appeared to have rotated as a rigid block, Simpson & Cox (1977) proposed two models. First was rotation about a southern pivot in contact with the Klamath Mountains. This has various problems, especially because at the northern end sediments and even boulders from the continent are found at the base of the Crescent Formation, showing that it was near the continent from the beginning. In the second model (subsequently refined by Hammond 1979), Siletzia was originally adjacent to the Olympic–Wallowa Lineament, then rifted from the continent and rotated about a northern pivot near the Olympic Peninsula. Because sediments also show the Klamaths in close contact from the start, this requires the Klamaths to have moved with Siletzia. Originally there were conflicts in the understanding of when the Klamaths moved, and with the age and amount of rotation of the Clarno Formation in central Oregon. These were largely cleared up in a study of the Clarno Formation by Grommé et al. (1986) and illustrated with a palinspastic reconstruction as of 38 Ma.

=== Offshore model: A captured island chain? ===
An early and widely cited paper by Duncan (1982) (drawing on features of the fairly new theory of plate tectonics) exemplifies the off-shore or "seamount" type of models. It featured a set of radiometrically determined (K-Ar and ^{40}Ar-^{39}Ar) ages that were younger in the center (for the Grays River volcanics) and older at the ends. This dihedrally symmetric age progression strongly suggested the pattern seen at spreading ridges, where the older rock is carried away on both sides from where the new rock erupts. Duncan considered five models (but none involving rifting or ridge subduction), favoring one where a hotspot — presumably the Yellowstone hotspot — intersected the Farallon-Kula spreading ridge (such as at Iceland) to generate a chain of islands. These islands were then accreted to the continent as the underlying oceanic crust was subducted.

This study has been criticized on multiple grounds, particularly regarding the ages. Duncan himself noted that measurement of the northern ages may have been affected by loss of argon due to low-grade metamorphism, and that there might be bias in respect of stratigraphic position. The latter was demonstrated by a recent study that showed, on the basis of geochemistry, that the Grays River volcanics followed the Siletzia eruptions, and thus are not representative of the initial phase of Siletz magmatism. Recent dating also shows a more monotonic trend of south to north age progression ("younging").

The range of the original ages was also a problem, as the rate of Kula-Farallon spreading over that time would produce a chain of seamounts much longer than observed, and too far away from the continent to explain the continentally derived sediments. This objection is attenuated somewhat in that the newer ages show a smaller range of ages.

=== Inshore models ===
Various models have Siletzia forming inshore, on or near the continental margin. While all current models have Siletzia rifting away from the continent after accretion or formation, a subclass of "rifted" models consider the rifting to have caused the Siletzia eruptions.

Wells et al. 1984 proposed that the Siletzia basalts might have "leaked" through transform faults (perpendicular to a spreading ridge) during changes in direction of the tectonic plates. The size of these eruptions and their location in this region is attributed to proximity to the Yellowstone hotspot. This "leaky transform" theory seems to be largely rejected, likely because the plate motion model it was based on was shown to be faulty.

Wells, et al., alternately suggested that as a terrane at the margin of the continent was pushed over the Yellowstone hotspot, it was rifted away from the continent by the upwelling magma, which then formed the Siletzia basalts. This idea was further developed by Babcock et al. (1992), who suggested rifting might have been initiated by a change in plate direction, or by kinematic effects as the Kula-Farallon ridge migrated along the continental margin. One such effect is the formation of a slab window (or slab gap) which would allow increased upwelling of magma.

=== Slab windows ===
That spreading ridges could be subducted was recognized early in the development of plate tectonic theory, but there was little consideration of the ensuing effects. In the 1980s came realization that the magma welling up from the asthenosphere through the subducted ridge would not reach seawater, and thus not be quenched to form rock and close the gap. Continued spreading would lead to a widening gap or "window" in the subducting plate through which there could be increased flow of magma. The implications of this for Siletzia were first shown by Thorkelson & Taylor (1989) and Babcock et al. (1992) (following the pioneering work by Dickinson & Snyder 1979). Breitsprecher et al. (2003) subsequently identified the fan-shaped wake of volcanics of distinctive geochemistry left by the widening Kula-Farallon slab window across northeastern Washington and into Idaho.

Madsen et al. (2006) showed that most of the Eocene and subsequent magmatism from Alaska to Oregon "is explainable in terms of ridge subduction and slab window tectonics". That is, a slab window — and a single subducted ridge can give rise to multiple slab windows — can provide adequate magmatism without having to invoke a hotspot (mantle plume). (So much so that it has been suggested that the Yellowstone hotspot may have been initiated by a slab window.) Mantle plumes and slab windows both feature voluminous magmatism; the main difference is that slab windows would form only where the spreading ridge is subducted. This implies formation at the continental margin, and then rifting, in the manner of the second class of models.

=== Gulf of Alaska ===
Any model of the origin of Siletzia must account for interactions with plate boundaries that were being subducted under North America through the Eocene. Early studies were plagued by indeterminate locations for these boundaries, particularly of the Kula-Farallon (K-F) spreading ridge: basalts at the head of the Gulf of Alaska (along the Alaska panhandle) have ages and compositions corresponding to the Siletz volcanics, suggesting that the K-F ridge was offshore of the Yukon at the same time it was offshore of Washington. This can be resolved by assuming that by about 56 Ma the eastern part of the Kula plate had broken away to form the Resurrection plate, with the new Kula-Resurrection (K-R) spreading ridge running up the Gulf of Alaska towards Kodiak Island, and the former K-F (now R-F) ridge reaching Washington. Subduction of this plate under western Canada was rapid, and it disappeared entirely with subduction of the K-R ridge about 50 Ma.

This scenario then permits rapid transport north of crustal blocks such as the Yakutat terrane. Now lying southeast of Cordova at the head of the Gulf of Alaska, paleomagnetic evidence indicates it was formed at a latitude corresponding to Oregon or northern California. Similarly, certain schists on Baranof Island are believed to have been contiguous with the Leech River Schists (Leech River Complex) on Vancouver Island around 50 Ma, and subsequently transported northward with other elements of the Chugach-Prince William terrane.

== After accretion: 50-42 Ma ==
Whether formed far offshore as seamounts, or close inshore by a slab window, the Siletzian basalts were laid down on a subducting oceanic plate: the Siletz terrane on the Farallon Plate, and the Crescent terrane most likely on the adjoining Resurrection plate (previously broken away from the Kula Plate, which had previously broken away from the Farallon Plate). In both cases the Siletzia mass was drawn toward the subduction zone, which possibly ran diagonally across what is now Washington, approximately at the position of the Olympic–Wallowa Lineament. However, Siletzia was too big to be subducted, and it accreted to the continent. Accretion is sometimes called "docking," but is more akin to a collision: various peripheral structures are first folded or crushed, then the main structures are deformed when they come into contact, and various parts get pushed over other parts, all this playing out over several million years. To the extent that the accretion of Siletzia to North America can be given a definite date most studies give it as about 50 Ma. This date has added significance as it is also the start of a change in direction of the Pacific plate, as seen in the bend in the Hawaiian-Emperor seamount chain, and also a change in the Pacific Northwest from compressional to extensional tectonics. This may also be when the last of the Resurrection plate was subducted under British Columbia. Initiation of the north-striking right-lateral Straight Creek Fault at ~48 Ma likely resulted from strain accumulated during the accretion of Siletzia.

As Siletzia accreted it also jammed the existing subduction zone, halting subduction of the Farallon plate. This terminated the Laramide orogeny that had been uplifting the Rocky Mountains, and triggered the ignimbrite sweep, a wave of large-volume silicic magmatism that swept over much of western North America between 20 and 50 Ma. This undoubtedly affected the enigmatic and controversial Challis Arc (stretching from southeastern British Columbia to the Idaho Batholith, roughly parallel with the Olympic–Wallowa Lineament), but the details of this are unknown.

Subduction, having ceased at the existing zone, eventually reinitiated further to the west as the current Cascadia subduction zone. Volcanism from the new subduction zone (such as the Grays River Volcanics and Northcraft Volcanics) reached the surface about 42 Ma, thereby initiating the rise of the ancestral Cascade Range.

Several other significant events occurred around 42 Ma, including cessation of metamorphism of the Leech River Schists (resulting from the Metchosin/Crescent Formation being thrust under Vancouver Island) and the end of strike-slip motion on the Straight Creek Fault; these may reflect the last movement of Siletzia relative to North America. On a broader scale, there was a change in absolute direction of the Pacific Plate (marked by the end of the bend in the Hawaiian-Emperor seamount chain), and a change in the convergence of the Kula plate with the North American Plate.

As subduction waned so did the force that had clamped Siletzia against the continent, and the tectonic regime shifted from compressional to extensional. Deposition of sand from the then proximal Idaho Batholith into the Tyee Formation in southern Oregon may have continued as late as 46.5 Ma, but was interrupted when Siletzia rifted from the continent and began rotating away. What initiated rifting is unknown. Wells et al. (1984, p. 290) suggested that as the continent overrode the Yellowstone hotspot, the upwelling plume tore away a previously accreted terrane. Babcock et al. (1992) suggested a change in the rate at which the plates were converging, or the "kinematic effects" (such as a slab window) from the passage of the Kula-Farallon ridge (or Resurrection-Farallon ridge).

== See also ==
- Geology of the Pacific Northwest
- Laramide orogeny

== Sources ==
- Arnold, R. (24 September 1906), "Geological reconnaissance of the coast of the Olympic Mountains.", Geological Society of America Bulletin, 17: 451–468, doi:10.1130/GSAB-17-451.
- Babcock, R. S.; Burmester, R. F.; Engebretson, D. C.; Warnock, A.; Clark, K. P. (1992), "A Rifted Margin Origin for the Crescent Basalt and Related Rocks in the Northern Coast Range Volcanic Province, Washington and British Columbia", Journal of Geophysical Research, 97 (B5): 6799–6821, Bibcode:1992JGR....97.6799B, doi:10.1029/91jb02926, archived from the original on 7 July 2019.
- Babcock, R. S.; Suczek, C. A.; Engebretson, D. C. (1994), "The Crescent "Terrane", Olympic Peninsula and Southern Vancouver Island" (PDF), in Lasmanis, Raymond; Cheney, Eric S. (eds.), Regional Geology of Washington State, Bulletin, vol. 80, Washington DGER, pp. 141–157, archived (PDF) from the original on 7 June 2012.
- Baldwin, E. M. (1974), "Eocene stratigraphy of southwestern Oregon", Oregon DOGAMI Bulletin, 83, 1 plate, scale 1:250,000, with 40 p. text.
- Baldwin, E. M.; Perttu, R. K. (January 1989), "Eocene unconformities in the Camas Valley quadrangle, Oregon" (PDF), Oregon Geology, 51 (1): 3–8, archived (PDF) from the original on 21 May 2015.
- Bates, R. G.; Beck, M. E.; Burmester, R. F. (April 1981), "Tectonic rotations in the Cascade Range of southern Washington", Geology, 9 (4): 184–189, Bibcode:1981Geo.....9..184B, doi:10.1130/0091-7613(1981)9<184:TRITCR>2.0.CO;2.
- Beck, M. E.; Engebretson, D. C. (10 May 1982), "Paleomagnetism of small basalt exposures in the west Puget Sound area, Washington, and speculations on the accretionary origin of the Olympic Mountains", Journal of Geophysical Research, 87 (B5): 3755–3760, Bibcode:1982JGR....87.3755B, doi:10.1029/JB087iB05p03755.
- Beck, M. E.; Plumley, P. W. (December 1980), "Paleomagnetism of intrusive rocks in the Coast Range of Oregon: Microplate rotations in middle Tertiary time", Geology, 8 (12): 573–577, Bibcode:1980Geo.....8..573B, doi:10.1130/0091-7613(1980)8<573:POIRIT>2.0.CO;2.
- Blakely, R. J. (10 November 1994), "Volcanism, Isostatic Residual Gravity, and Regional Tectonic Setting of the Cascade Volcanic Province", Journal of Geophysical Research, 90 (B2): 2757–2773, Bibcode:1990JGR....9519439B, doi:10.1029/jb095ib12p19439, archived from the original on 7 July 2019.
- Blakely, R. J.; Wells, R. E.; Weaver, C. S.; Meagher, K. L.; Ludwin, R. (May 2002), "The bump and grind of Cascadia forearc blocks: evidence from gravity and magnetic anomalies [abstract]", GSA Abstracts with Programs, 34 (5), archived from the original on 10 March 2016.
- Brandon, M. T.; Vance, J. A. (October 1992), "Tectonic evolution of the Cenozoic Olympic subduction complex, Washington State, as deduced from fission track ages for detrital zircons" (PDF), American Journal of Science, 293 (8): 565–636, Bibcode:1992AmJS..292..565B, doi:10.2475/ajs.292.8.565, archived (PDF) from the original on 22 April 2012.
- du Bray, E. A.; John, D. A. (October 2011), "Petrologic, tectonic, and metallogenic evolution of the ancestral Cascades magmatic arc, Washington, Oregon, and Northern California", Geosphere, 7 (5): 1102–1133, doi:10.1130/GES00669.1.
- Breitsprecher, K.; Thorkelson, D. J.; Groome, W. G.; Dostal, J. (April 2003), "Geochemical confirmation of the Kula-Farallon slab window beneath the Pacific Northwest in Eocene time" (PDF), Geological Society of America Bulletin, 31 (4): 351–354, Bibcode:2003Geo....31..351B, doi:10.1130/0091-7613(2003)031<0351:gcotkf>2.0.co;2.
- Bromley, S. A. (June 2011), Evolution and Inheritance of Cascadia Sub-arc Mantle Reservoirs [masters thesis], Oregon State University.
- Cady, W. M. (September–October 1975), "Tectonic setting of the Tertiary volcanic rocks of the Olympic Peninsula, Washington" (PDF), USGS Journal of Research, 3 (5): 573–582, archived (PDF) from the original on 4 March 2016.
- Chan, C. F.; Tepper, J. H.; Nelson, B. K. (July–August 2012), "Petrology of the Grays River volcanics, southwest Washington: Plume-influenced slab window magmatism in the Cascadia forearc", Geological Society of America Bulletin, 124 (7–8): 1324–1338, Bibcode:2012GSAB..124.1324C, doi:10.1130/B30576.1.
- Christiansen, R. L.; Foulger, G. R.; Evans, J. R. (October 2002), "Upper-mantle origin of the Yellowstone hotspot" (PDF), Geological Society of America Bulletin, 114 (10): 1245–1256, Bibcode:2002GSAB..114.1245C, doi:10.1130/0016-7606(2002)114<1245:UMOOTY>2.0.CO;2, archived (PDF) from the original on 3 July 2007.
- Clowes, R. M.; Brandon, M. T.; Green, A. G.; Yorath, C. J.; Brown, A. S.; Kanasewich, E. R.; Spencer, C. (January 1987), "Lithoprobe— southern Vancouver Island: Cenozoic subduction complex imaged by deep seismic reflections" (PDF), Canadian Journal of Earth Sciences, 24 (1): 31–51, Bibcode:1987CaJES..24...31C, doi:10.1139/e87-004, archived from the original (PDF) on 27 March 2012.
- Cowan, D. S. (25 August 2003), "Revisiting the Baranof-Leech River hypothesis for early Tertiary coastwise transport of the Chugach-Prince William Terrane", Earth and Planetary Science Letters, 213 (3–4): 463–475, Bibcode:2003E&PSL.213..463C, doi:10.1016/S0012-821X(03)00300-5.
- Davis, A. S.; Plafker, G. (November 1986), "Eocene basalts from the Yakutat Terrane; evidence for the origin of an accreting terrane in southern Alaska", Geology, 14 (11): 963–966, Bibcode:1986Geo....14..963D, doi:10.1130/0091-7613(1986)14<963:EBFTYT>2.0.CO;2.
- Dickinson, W. R. (September 1976), "Sedimentary basins developed during evolution of Mesozoic-Cenozoic arc-trench system in western North America", Canadian Journal of Earth Sciences, 13 (9): 1268–1287, Bibcode:1976CaJES..13.1268D, doi:10.1139/e76-129.
- Dickinson, W. R.; Snyder, W. S. (1979), "Geometry of subducted slabs related to San Andreas transform", Journal of Geology, 87 (6): 609–627, Bibcode:1979JG.....87..609D, doi:10.1086/628456, S2CID 129169733.
- Donaghy, E.E.; Eddy, M.P.; Ridgway, K.D.; Ickert, R.B. (November 2024), "Sedimentary record of oceanic plateau accretion: Revisiting the Eocene to Miocene stratigraphy of the northern Olympic Peninsula, Washington (USA)", Geosphere , 21 (1): 49–73, doi:10.1130/GES02778.1.
- Dumitru, T. A.; Ernst, W. G.; Wright, J. E.; Wooden, J. L.; Wells, R. E.; Farmer, L. P.; Kent, A. J. R.; Graham, S. A. (February 2013), "Eocene extension in Idaho generated massive sediment floods into the Franciscan trench and into the Tyee, Great Valley, and Green River basins", Geology, 41 (2): 187–190, Bibcode:2013Geo....41..187D, doi:10.1130/G33746.1.
- Duncan, R. A. (10 December 1982), "A captured island chain in the coast range of Oregon and Washington" (PDF), Journal of Geophysical Research, 87 (B13): 10,827–10,837, Bibcode:1982JGR....8710827D, doi:10.1029/jb087ib13p10827, archived (PDF) from the original on 4 March 2016.
- Eddy, Michael P.; Clark, Kenneth P.; Polenz, Michael (May 2017), "Age and volcanic stratigraphy of the Eocene Siletzia oceanic plateau in Washington and on Vancouver Island", Lithosphere, 9 (4): 652–654, doi:10.1130/L650.1.
- Finn, C. (10 November 1990). "Geophysical constraints on Washington convergent margin structure". Journal of Geophysical Research (FTP). pp. 19,533–19,546. Bibcode:1990JGR....9519533F. doi:10.1029/jb095ib12p19533. (To view documents see Help:FTP).
- Fleming, S. W.; Tréhu, A. M. (10 September 1999), "Crustal structure beneath the central Oregon convergent margin from potential-field modeling: Evidence for a buried basement ridge in local contact with a seaward dipping backstop" (PDF), Journal of Geophysical Research, 104 (B9): 20,431–20,447, Bibcode:1999JGR...10420431F, doi:10.1029/1999jb900159, archived (PDF) from the original on 29 October 2013.
- Gao, H. (March 2011), The seismic structures of the U.S. Pacific Northwest and the scaling and recurrence patterns of the slow slip events [dissertation] (PDF), University of Oregon, archived (PDF) from the original on 3 March 2016.
- Gao, H.; Humphreys, E. D.; Yao, H.; van der Hilst, R. D. (2011), "Crust and lithosphere structure of the northwestern U.S. with ambient noise tomography: Terrane accretion and Cascade arc development", Earth and Planetary Science Letters, 304 (1–2): 202–211, Bibcode:2011E&PSL.304..202G, doi:10.1016/j.epsl.2011.01.033. Available on Google Books.
- Globerman, B. R.; Beck, M. E.; Duncan, R. A. (November 1982), "Paleomagnetism and tectonic significance of Eocene basalts from the Black Hills, Washington Coast Range", Geological Society of America Bulletin, 91 (11): 1151–1159, Bibcode:1982GSAB...93.1151G, doi:10.1130/0016-7606(1982)93<1151:PATSOE>2.0.CO;2.
- Goldfinger, C. (May 1990), Evolution of the Corvallis Fault and Implications for the Oregon Coast Range [masters thesis], Oregon State University.
- Goldfinger, C.; Kulm, L. D.; Yeats, R. S.; McNeill, L.; Hummon, C. (10 April 1997), "Oblique strike-slip faulting of the central Cascadia submarine forearc" (PDF), Journal of Geophysical Research, 102 (B4): 8217–8243, Bibcode:1997JGR...102.8217G, doi:10.1029/96jb02655, archived (PDF) from the original on 29 October 2013.
- Graindorge, D.; Spence, G.; Charvis, P.; Collot, J. Y.; Hyndman, R.; Trehu, A. M. (October 2003), "Crustal structure beneath the Strait of Juan de Fuca and southern Vancouver Island from seismic and gravity analyses" (PDF), Journal of Geophysical Research: Solid Earth, 108 (B10): 2484, Bibcode:2003JGRB..108.2484G, doi:10.1029/2002JB001823, archived (PDF) from the original on 4 November 2014.
- Grommé, C. S.; Beck, M. E.; Wells, R. E.; Engebretson, D. C. (10 December 1986), "Paleomagnetism of the Tertiary Clarno Formation and its Significance for the Tectonic History of the Pacific Northwest", Journal of Geophysical Research, 91 (B14): 14,089–14,104, Bibcode:1986JGR....9114089G, doi:10.1029/JB091iB14p14089.
- Haeussler, P. J.; Bradley, D. C.; Wells, R. E.; Miller, M. L. (July 2003), "Life and death of the Resurrection plate: Evidence for its existence and subduction in the northeastern Pacific in Paleocene-Eocene time" (PDF), Geological Society of America Bulletin, 115 (7): 867–880, Bibcode:2003GSAB..115..867H, doi:10.1130/0016-7606(2003)115<0867:LADOTR>2.0.CO;2, archived (PDF) from the original on 24 December 2016.
- Hamilton, W. (December 1969), "California and the underflow of the Pacific mantle", Geological Society of America Bulletin, 80 (12): 2409–2430, doi:10.1130/0016-7606(1969)80[2409:MCATUO]2.0.CO;2.
- Hammond, P. E. (14 March 1979), "A tectonic model for evolution of the Cascade Range", in Armentrout, J. M.; Cole, M. R.; TerBest Jr., H. (eds.), The Cenozoic paleogeography of the Western United States, Society of Economic Paleontologists and Mineralogists, pp. 219–237.
- Heller, P. L.; Peterman, Z. E.; O'Neil, J. R.; Shafiquallah, M. (June 1985), "Isotopic provenance of sandstones from the Eocene Tyee Formation, Oregon Coast Range", Geological Society of America Bulletin, 96 (6): 770–780, Bibcode:1985GSAB...96..770H, doi:10.1130/0016-7606(1985)96<770:IPOSFT>2.0.CO;2.
- Heller, P. L.; Ryberg, P. T. (July 1983), "Sedimentary record of subduction to forearec transition in the rotated Eocene basin of western Oregon", Geology, 11 (7): 380–383, Bibcode:1983Geo....11..380H, doi:10.1130/0091-7613(1983)11<380:SROSTF>2.0.CO;2.
- Heller, P. L.; Tabor, R. W.; Suczek, C. A. (August 1987), "Paleogeographic evolution of the U.S. Pacific Northwest during Paleogene time" (PDF), Canadian Journal of Earth Sciences, 24 (8): 1652–1667, Bibcode:1987CaJES..24.1652H, doi:10.1139/e87-159, archived (PDF) from the original on 3 May 2014.
- Henriksen, D. A. (1956), "Eocene stratigraphy of the lower Cowlitz River–eastern Willapa Hills area, southwestern Washington" (PDF), Washington Division of Mines and Geology Bulletin, 43, archived (PDF) from the original on 26 August 2012.
- Irving, E. (March 1979), "Paleopoles and paleolatitudes of North America and speculations about displaced terranes", Canadian Journal of Earth Sciences, 16 (3): 669–694, Bibcode:1979CaJES..16..669I, doi:10.1139/e79-065.
- Johnston, S. T.; Acton, S. (24 April 2003), "The Eocene Southern Vancouver Island Orocline — a response to seamount accretion and the cause of fold-and-thrust belt and extensional basin formation" (PDF), Tectonophysics, 365 (104): 165–183, Bibcode:2003Tectp.365..165J, doi:10.1016/S0040-1951(03)00021-0, archived (PDF) from the original on 4 March 2016.
- Lonsdale, P. (May 1988), "Paleogene history of the Kula plate: offshore evidence and onshore implications", Geological Society of America Bulletin, 100 (5): 733–754, Bibcode:1988GSAB..100..733L, doi:10.1130/0016-7606(1988)100<0733:PHOTKP>2.3.CO;2.
- Lyttle, N. A.; Clarke, D. B. (March 1975), "New analyses of Eocene basalts from the Olympic Peninsula, Washington", Geological Society of America Bulletin, 86 (3): 421–427, Bibcode:1975GSAB...86..421L, doi:10.1130/0016-7606(1975)86<421:NAOEBF>2.0.CO;2.
- Madsen, J. K.; Thorkelson, D. J.; Friedman, R. M.; Marshall, D. D. (February 2006), "Cenozoic to Recent plate configurations in the Pacific Basin: Ridge subduction and slab window magmatism in western North America" (PDF), Geosphere, 2 (1): 11–34, Bibcode:2006Geosp...2...11M, doi:10.1130/GES00020.1, archived (PDF) from the original on 14 August 2017.
- Magill, J. R.; Cox, A. V. (March 1981), "Post-Oligocene tectonic rotation of the Oregon Western Cascade Range and the Klamath Mountains", Geology, 9 (3): 127–131, Bibcode:1981Geo.....9..127M, doi:10.1130/0091-7613(1981)9<127:PTROTO>2.0.CO;2.
- Magill, J. R.; Cox, A. V.; Duncan, R. (10 April 1981), "Tillamook Volcanic Series: Further evidence for tectonic rotation of the Oregon Coast Ranges" (PDF), Journal of Geophysical Research, 86 (B4): 2953–2970, Bibcode:1981JGR....86.2953M, doi:10.1029/JB086iB04p02953, archived (PDF) from the original on 4 November 2014.
- Magill, J. R.; Wells, R. E.; Simpson, R. W.; Cox, A. V. (10 May 1982), "Post-12 m.y. rotation of southwest Washington", Journal of Geophysical Research, 87 (B5): 3761–3776, Bibcode:1982JGR....87.3761M, doi:10.1029/jb087ib05p03761.
- Massey, N. W. D. (June 1986), "Metchosin Igneous Complex, southern Vancouver Island: Ophiolite stratigraphy developed in an emergent island setting", Geology, 14 (7): 602–605, Bibcode:1986Geo....14..602M, doi:10.1130/0091-7613(1986)14<602:MICSVI>2.0.CO;2.
- McCrory, P.; Wilson, D. S. (March 2013a). Siletz‐Crescent Forearc Terrane Revisited » Does a New Kinematic Model Solve an Old Puzzle?. Earthquake Science Center seminar. Menlo Park (Calif.): United States Geological Survey. Archived from the original on 4 March 2016..
- McCrory, P.; Wilson, D. S. (June 2013b), "A kinematic model for the formation of the Siletz-Crescent forearc terrane by capture of coherent fragments of the Farallon and Resurrection plates.", Tectonics, 32 (3): 718–736, Bibcode:2013Tecto..32..718M, doi:10.1002/tect.20045, S2CID 128454033.
- McWilliams, R. G. (September 1980), "Eocene correlations in western Oregon-Washington" (PDF), Oregon Geology, 42 (9): 151–158, archived (PDF) from the original on 21 May 2015.
- Michaud, F.; Bourgois, J.; Royer, J.; Dyment, J.; Sichler, B.; Bandy, W.; Mortera, C.; Calmus, T.; Vieyra, M.; Sosson, M.; Pontoise, B.; Bigot-Cormier, F.; Diaz, O.; Hurtado, A.; Pardo, G.; Trouillard-Perrot, C. (Fall 2002), "The FAMEX Cruise off Baja California (March/April 2002): Preliminary Results [abstract #T52A-1186]", American Geophysical Union, Fall Meeting, Bibcode:2002agufm.t52a1186m.
- Miller, K. C.; Keller, G. R.; Gridley, J. M.; Luetgert, J. H.; Mooney, W. D.; Thybo, H. (10 August 1997), "Crustal structure along the west flank of the Cascades, western Washington", Journal of Geophysical Research, 102 (B8): 17,857–17,873, Bibcode:1997JGR...10217857M, doi:10.1029/97jb00882.
- Miner, A. M. (June 2002), Eocene tectonics and active deformation in Cascadia [masters thesis], Central Washington University.
- Moye, F. J.; Hackett, W. R.; Blakely, J. D.; Snider, L. G. (1988), "Regional geologic setting and volcanic stratigraphy of the Challis volcanic field, central Idaho", in P. K., Link; W. R., Hackett (eds.), Guidebook to the Geology of Central and Southern Idaho (PDF), Idaho Geological Survey Bulletin, vol. 27, pp. 87–97, archived (PDF) from the original on 31 January 2016.
- Oxford, J. (October 2006), Early Oligocene Intrusions in the Central Coast Range of Oregon: Petrography, Geochemistry, Geochronology and Implications for the Tertiary Magmatic Evolution of the Cascadia Forearc [masters thesis], Oregon State University, hdl:1957/3635.
- Parsons, T.; Wells, R. E.; Fisher, M. A.; Flueh, E.; ten Brink, U. S. (10 August 1999), "Three-dimensional velocity structure of Siletzia and other accreted terranes in the Cascadia forearc of Washington" (PDF), Journal of Geophysical Research, 104 (B8): 18,015–18,039, Bibcode:1999JGR...10418015P, doi:10.1029/1999jb900106, archived (PDF) from the original on 29 October 2013.
- Phillips, W. M.; Walsh, T. J.; Hagen, R. A. (December 1989), "Eocene transition from oceanic to arc volcanism, southwest Washington" (PDF), in Muffler, L. J.; Weaver, C. S.; Blackwell, D. D. (eds.), Proceedings of workshop XLIV: Geological, geophysical, and tectonic setting of the Cascade Range, U.S. Geological Survey, vol. Open-File Report 89-176, pp. 199–256, archived (PDF) from the original on 4 March 2016.
- Prothero, D. R.; Draus, E.; Burns, B. (2009), "Magnetostratigraphy and Tectonic Rotation of the Eocene-Oligocene Makah and Hoko River Formations, Northwest Washington, USA" (PDF), International Journal of Geophysics, 2009: 1–15, doi:10.1155/2009/930612, archived (PDF) from the original on 3 March 2016.
- Pyle, D. G.; Duncan, R.; Wells, R. E.; Graham, D. W.; Harrison, B.; Hanan, B. (October 2009), "Siletzia: an oceanic large igneous province in the Pacific Northwest [abstract]", GSA Abstracts with Programs, 41 (7): 369, archived from the original on 28 June 2010.
- Rarey, P. J. (1985), Geology of the Hamlet-North Fork of the Nehalem River Area, Southern Clatsop and Northernmost Tillamook Counties, Northwest Oregon [masters thesis], Oregon State University, archived from the original on 1 February 2021.
- Schmandt, B.; Humphreys, E. (September 2010), "Complex subduction and small-scale convection revealed by body-wave tomography of the western United States upper mantle" (PDF), Earth and Planetary Science Letters, 297 (3–4): 435–445, Bibcode:2010E&PSL.297..435S, doi:10.1016/j.epsl.2010.06.047.
- Schmandt, B.; Humphreys, E. (February 2011), "Seismically imaged relict slab from the 55 Ma Siletzia accretion to the northwest United States" (PDF), Geology, 39 (2): 175–178, Bibcode:2011Geo....39..175S, doi:10.1130/G31558.1.
- Sharp, W. D.; Clague, D. A. (September 2006), "50-Ma Initiation of Hawaiian-Emperor Bend Records Major Change in Pacific Plate Motion", Science, 313 (5791): 1281–1284, Bibcode:2006Sci...313.1281S, doi:10.1126/science.1128489, PMID 16946069, S2CID 43601673.
- Silberling, N. J.; Jones, D. L.; Blake Jr., M. C.; Howell, D. G. (1987), "Lithotectonic terrane map of the western conterminous-United States", U.S. Geological Survey, Miscellaneous Field Studies Map MF-1874-C, 1 sheet, scale 1:2,500,00, 20 p. text.
- Simpson, R. W.; Cox, A. (October 1977), "Paleomagnetic evidence for tectonic rotation of the Oregon Coast Range", Geology, 5 (10): 585–589, Bibcode:1977Geo.....5..585S, doi:10.1130/0091-7613(1977)5<585:PEFTRO>2.0.CO;2.
- Snavely, P. D.; Baldwin, E. M. (1948), "Siletz River Volcanic Series, northwestern Oregon", AAPG Bulletin, 32: 805–812, doi:10.1306/3d933b78-16b1-11d7-8645000102c1865d.
- Snavely, P. D.; MacLeod, N. S.; Wagner, H. C. (June 1968), "Tholeiitic and alkalic basalts of the Eocene Siletz River Volcanics, Oregon Coast Range", American Journal of Science, 266 (6): 454–481, Bibcode:1968AmJS..266..454S, doi:10.2475/ajs.266.6.454.
- Snavely, P. D.; Wagner, H. C.; MacLeod, N. S. (June 1965), "Preliminary data on compositional variations of Tertiary volcanic rocks in the central part of the Oregon Coast Range" (PDF), The Ore Bin, 27 (6): 101–117, archived (PDF) from the original on 21 May 2015.
- Snavely, P. D.; Wells, R. E. (1991), "Cenozoic evolution of the continental margin of Oregon and Washington" (PDF), U.S. Geological Survey, Open-File Report 91-441-B, archived (PDF) from the original on 29 October 2013.
- Snavely, P. D.; Wells, R. E. (1996), "Cenozoic evolution of the continental margin of Oregon and Washington", in Rogers, A. M.; Walsh, T. J.; Kockelman, W. J.; Priest, G. R. (eds.), Assessing Earthquake Hazards and Reducing Risk in the Pacific Northwest, Vol. 1, Professional Paper 1560, vol. 1, U.S. Geological Survey, pp. 161–182, ISBN 9780607892628.
- Stanley, W. D.; Finn, C.; Plesha, J. L. (September 1987), "Tectonics and Conductivity Structures in the Southern Washington Cascades", Journal of Geophysical Research, 92 (B10): 10,179–10,193, Bibcode:1987JGR....9210179S, doi:10.1029/jb092ib10p10179, archived from the original on 1 February 2021.
- Stanley, W. D.; Johnson, S. Y.; Qamar, A. I.; Weaver, C. S.; Williams, J. M. (February 1996), "Tectonics and Seismicity of the Southern Washington Cascade Range" (PDF), Bulletin of the Seismological Society of America, 86 (1A): 1–18, doi:10.1785/BSSA08601A0001, archived from the original (PDF) on 20 August 2011.
- Thorkelson, D. J. (20 April 1996), "Subduction of diverging plates and the principles of slab window formation" (PDF), Tectonophysics, 255 (1–2): 47–63, Bibcode:1996Tectp.255...47T, doi:10.1016/0040-1951(95)00106-9, archived (PDF) from the original on 4 March 2016.
- Thorkelson, D. J.; Taylor, R. P. (September 1989), "Cordilleran slab windows" (PDF), Geology, 17 (9): 833–836, Bibcode:1989Geo....17..833T, doi:10.1130/0091-7613(1989)017<0833:csw>2.3.co;2, archived (PDF) from the original on 4 March 2016.
- Trehu, A. M.; Asudeh, I.; Brocher, T. M.; Luetgert, J. H.; Mooney, W. D.; Nabelek, J. L.; Nakamura, Y. (14 October 1994), "Crustal architecture of the Cascadia forearc", Science, 266 (5183): 237–243, Bibcode:1994Sci...266..237T, doi:10.1126/science.266.5183.237, PMID 17771442, S2CID 23035199.
- Vance, J. A.; Miller, R. B. (1994), "Another look at the Fraser River-Straight Creek Fault (FRSCF) [GSA Abstract 5451]", in R., Lasmanis; E. S., Cheney (eds.), Regional Geology of Washington State (PDF), Bulletin, vol. 80, Washington DGER, p. 88, archived (PDF) from the original on 7 June 2012.
- Warnock, A. C.; Burmester, R. F.; Engebretson, D. C. (10 July 1993), "Paleomagnetism and tectonics of the Crescent Formation, northern Olympic Mountains, Washington", Journal of Geophysical Research, 98 (B7): 11,729–11,741, Bibcode:1993JGR....9811729W, doi:10.1029/93jb00709, archived from the original on 4 June 2020.
- Weaver, C. E. (1 December 1939), "Metchosin volcanic rock in Oregon and Washington [abstract]", Geological Society of America Bulletin, 50 (12, part 2): 1961, doi:10.1130/GSAB-50-1945.
- Wells, R. E.; Bukry, D.; Wooden, J. L.; Friedman, R. M.; Haeussler, P. J. (Fall 2010), "Magmatic and kinematic history of Siletzia, a Paleocene-Eocene accreted oceanic terrane in the Oregon Coast Range [abstract #T12C-06]", AGU Fall Meeting Abstracts, 2010, American Geophysical Union, Bibcode:2010AGUFM.T12C..06W.
- Wells, Ray; Bukry, David; Friedman, Richard; Pyle, Doug; Duncan, Robert; Haeussler, Peter; Wooden, Joe (August 2014), "Geologic history of Siletzia, a large igneous province in the Oregon and Washington Coast Range: Correlation to the geomagnetic polarity time scale and implications for a long-lived Yellowstone hotspot", Geosphere, 10 (4): 692–719, Bibcode:2014Geosp..10..692W, doi:10.1130/GES01018.1, archived from the original on 1 February 2021.
- Wells, R. E.; Engebretson, D. C.; Snavely, P. D.; Coe, R. S. (April 1984), "Cenozoic Plate Motions and the Volcano-Tectonic Evolution of Western Oregon and Washington" (PDF), Tectonics, 3 (2): 275–294, Bibcode:1984Tecto...3..275W, doi:10.1029/TC003i002p00275, archived (PDF) from the original on 24 September 2015.
- Wells, R. E.; Heller, P. L. (March 1988), "The relative contribution of accretion, shear, and extension to Cenozoic tectonic rotation in the Pacific Northwest", Geological Society of America Bulletin, 100 (3): 325–338, Bibcode:1988GSAB..100..325W, doi:10.1130/0016-7606(1988)100<0325:TRCOAS>2.3.CO;2.
- Wells, R. E.; Jayko, A. S.; Niem, A. R.; Black, G.; Wiley, T.; Baldwin, E.; Molenaar, K. M.; Wheeler, K. L.; DuRoss, C. B.; Givler, R. W. (2000), "Geologic Map and Database of the Roseburg 30 x 60' Quadrangle, Douglas and Coos Counties, Oregon" (PDF), U.S. Geological Survey, Open-File Report 00-376, archived (PDF) from the original on 28 February 2013.
- Wells, R. E.; McCaffrey, R. (September 2013), "Steady rotation of the Cascade arc", Geology, 41 (9): 1027–1030, Bibcode:2013Geo....41.1027W, doi:10.1130/G34514.1.
- Wells, R. E.; Simpson, R. W. (2001), "Northward migration of the Cascadia forearc in the northwestern U.S. and implications for subduction deformation" (PDF), Earth, Planets and Space, 53 (4): 275–283, Bibcode:2001EP&S...53..275W, doi:10.1186/bf03352384, archived (PDF) from the original on 2 April 2015.
- Wells, R. E.; Weaver, C. S.; Blakely, R. J. (August 1998), "Forearc migration in Cascadia and its neotectonic significance" (PDF), Geology, 26 (8): 759–762, Bibcode:1998Geo....26..759W, doi:10.1130/0091-7613(1998)026<0759:famica>2.3.co;2, archived from the original (PDF) on 16 May 2008.
- Wilson, D. S.; McCrory, P. A. (Fall 2010), "A kinematic model for the formation of the Siletz terrane by capture of coherent fragments of the Farallon and Resurrection plates [abstract #T13C-2210]", AGU Fall Meeting Abstracts, 2010, American Geophysical Union, Bibcode:2010AGUFM.T13C2210W.
- Zandt, G.; Humphreys, G. (April 2009), "Toroidal mantle flow through the western U.S. slab window" (PDF), Geology, 36 (4): 295–298, Bibcode:2008Geo....36..295Z, doi:10.1130/G24611A.1, archived from the original (PDF) on 12 June 2011.
