= Kula =

Kula may refer to:

== People ==
- Bob Kula (born 1967), American football player
- Elisabeth Kula (born 1990), German politician
- Irwin Kula (born 1957), American rabbi and author
- Karel Kula (born 1963), Czech footballer

== Places ==
- Kula, Bihać, a village in Bosnia and Herzegovina
- Kula (Bugojno), a village in Bosnia and Herzegovina
- Kula, Busovača, a village in Bosnia and Herzegovina
- Kula, Konjic, a village in Bosnia and Herzegovina
- Kula (Sokolac), a village in Bosnia and Herzegovina
- Kula, Travnik, a village in Bosnia and Herzegovina
- Kula, Zenica, a village in Bosnia and Herzegovina
- Kula, Bulgaria, a town and municipality in Vidin Province, Bulgaria
- Kula, Croatia, a village in Požega-Slavonia County, Croatia
- Kula, Ethiopia, a town in Ethiopia
- Kula Eco Park, a zoological park near Sigatoka, Fiji
- Kula, Iran, a village in East Azerbaijan Province, Iran
- Kula, Serbia, a town and municipality in Vojvodina, Serbia
- Kula (volcano), a volcanic field in Turkey
- Kula, Manisa, a town in Western Anatolia, Turkey
- Kula, Hawaii, a district of East Maui in Hawaii, U.S.
- Kula, Sungurlu

== Other uses ==
- Kula ring, a ceremonial exchange system in Papua New Guinea
- Kula (unit), an obsolete unit of measurement in India and Morocco
- Kula or Kaula (Hinduism), a Hindu religious tradition
- Kula language, a Papuan language of Indonesia
- Kula language (Bantu), a Bantu language of the Democratic Republic of Congo
- Kula people (Asia), an ethnic group in Thailand and Cambodia
- Kula tribe (Australia), an indigenous Australian people of the state of New South Wales
- Kula tribe (Rivers State), a Nigerian tribe
- Kula, tower houses in the Balkans
- Kula Watermelon, a flavor of Bai Brands' Antioxidant Infusion

== See also ==
- Kaula (disambiguation)
- Kula Plate, an ancient oceanic plate, which began subducting under North America
- Kula-Farallon Ridge, an ancient mid-ocean ridge in the Pacific Ocean
- Kula Diamond, a character in the King of Fighters series
- KULA-LP, a radio station in American Samoa
- Kula Shaker, an English rock band
- Kula World, a platform video game
