= Leech River Fault =

British Columbia seismic fault

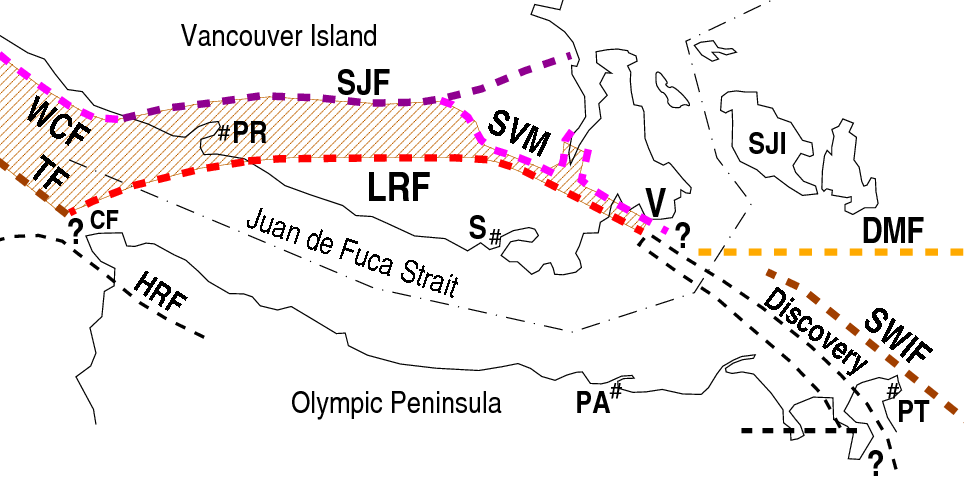
The Leech River Fault across the southern tip of Vancouver Island and the Tofino, West Coast, Hurricane Ridge (portion), San Juan, Survey Mountain, Devils Mountain, and Southern Whidbey Island Fault, and the projected extension of the Leech River Fault through Discovery Bay; all dip to the northeast. Stippled area is top of the Pacific Rim Terrane. Also shown: Cape Flattery, San Juan Island, and the cities of Port Renfrew, Sooke, Port Angeles, Port Townsend, and Victoria. The northeast extension of the San Juan fault may be an older feature. Newer studies show the Leech River fault more closely aligned with the SWIF.

The Leech River Fault extends across the southern tip of Vancouver Island in British Columbia, Canada, creating the distinctively straight, narrow, and steep-sided valley, occupied by Loss Creek and two reservoirs, that runs from Sombrio Point (southeast of Port Renfrew and Sombrio Beach) due east to the Leech River, and then turns southeast to run past Victoria. It is a thrust fault that marks the northernmost exposure of the Crescent Terrane (part of Siletzia), where basalt of the Metchosin Igneous Complex (correlative with the Crescent Formation on the Olympic Peninsula) is dragged under Vancouver Island by the subducting Juan de Fuca plate. About ten kilometres north the nearly parallel San Juan Fault marks the southern limit of rock of the Wrangellia terrane, which underlies most of Vancouver Island. Between these two northeast-dipping thrust faults are the Leech River Complex and (near Port Renfrew, but also outcrops near Victoria) the Pandora Peak Unit. These, along with the Pacific Rim Complex further up the coast, are remnants of the Pacific Rim Terrane which was crushed between Wrangellia and Siletzia. The contact between the bottom of Wrangellia and the top of the subducted PRT continues northwest along the coast as the West Coast Fault, and southeast towards Victoria as the Survey Mountain Fault. The Leech River Fault (LRF) extends off-shore towards Cape Flattery, where the Crescent—Pacific Rim contact continues northwest as the Tofino Fault (TF).

The bottom contact of the Crescent Terrane has been uplifted and exposed along the edge of the Olympic Peninsula, where it is known as the Hurricane Ridge Fault (HRF). West of Cape Flattery the southernmost edge of the Crescent Terrane appears to be an extension of the LRF, suggesting left-lateral strike-slip along the Leech River Fault that has offset the Crescent Terrane nearly its whole width.

The Leech River Fault (LRF) is a key element in understanding regional tectonic history as it and the San Juan Fault mark a change from the relatively simply subduction zone structure to the northwest, to the complex structures of the San Juan Islands and the Puget Lowland to the east and southeast. The straightness of its surface trace suggests the LRF has been a strike-slip fault. In these respects the LRF is very similar to the Devils Mountain Fault, which can be traced due west from near Mount Vernon to a point just south of Victoria.

Near the Leech River, where the Survey Mountain fault marks the eastern limit of the Leech River Complex, the LRF and the lineament it follows make a sharp turn to the south (heading S70°E) to run down the Goldstream River past Victoria and into the Juan de Fuca Strait. Such sharp turns are geometrically impossible for individual strike-slip faults, but the southeast-striking Goldstream arm of the LRF parallels the cross-cutting Survey Mountain fault. Strong aeromagnetic anomalies in the Strait that curve from Victoria to Discovery Bay (west of Port Townsend) led to early speculation that the LRF, and the eastern limit of the Crescent Formation, ran down Discovery Bay and the west side of Puget Sound, following the edge of a relict continental margin just as the Tofino Fault follows the present margin. More recent interpretations of marine seismic reflection studies align the Goldstream arm of the LRF with the Southern Whidbey Island Fault (SWIF), with splays branching towards Discovery Bay.

Discovery of Crescent Formation basalt in an exploration well on Whidbey Island (just east of Port Townsend) has led some writers to locate this extension of the LRF onto the southern part of Whidbey Island, just where the SWIF is found. While the eastern contact of the Crescent Formation is believed to not extend east of Whidbey Island, and may double-back westward under Seattle, active faulting on the SWIF extends southeast to where it connects with the Rattlesnake Mountain Fault Zone. Thus it appears that the Leech River and Devils Mountain faults were once a single left-lateral oblique fault (having both horizontal strike-slip and vertical dip-slip motion) that has been offset by right-lateral motion along the extended Survey Mountain—Southern Whidbey Island Fault.

The earlier history of the LRF is revealed by certain metamorphic rocks of the Pacific Rim terrane with a very distinctive mix of minerals. These are also found in the San Juan Islands and in isolated outcrops spread across the Cascades. They formed between 100 and 84 Ma (millions of years ago) during the Late Cretaceous when the Pacific Rim terrane was crushed between Wrangellia and the North American continental plate, dismembered, and the pieces smeared along what was then the edge of the continent. Continued right-lateral transpression carried outlying portions of Wrangellia and likely some odd pieces of the Pacific Rim terrane northwest to Gulf of Alaska. Note that the ancient continental margin was not along the modern coast line (that runs due south from Vancouver Island), but turned in at the modern day Juan de Fuca Strait and followed the Olympic–Wallowa Lineament (OWL) towards southern Idaho, paralleling the general trend of faulting in British Columbia and the North Cascades.

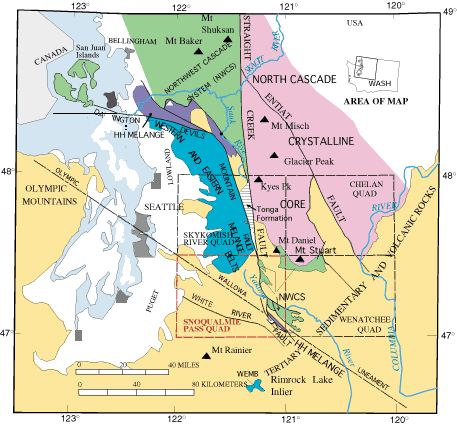
The Olympic–Wallowa Lineament (OWL) marks the approximate continental margin in the Late Cretaceous. The northeastward impact of part of Siletzia formed an embayment as indicated by the Darrington-Devils Mountain fault and the mélanges originally in front of the continental margin.

About 50 million years ago the Siletzia terrane, being borne to the northeast by the subducting plate, refused to be subducted. It ran it into the edge of the continent and embayed the overlying crust, bending the section of the Wrangellia—Pacific Rim contact now known as the San Juan fault to its current easterly orientation. This also initiated the oblique left-lateral Devils Mountain fault, including the section now known as the Leech River fault, and its right-lateral extension, the Darrington fault, that strikes southward from the town of Darrington to converge with the right-lateral strike-slip Straight Creek Fault at the OWL (see map). About 42 million years ago this northeastward force rotated to a northerly direction which, striking the SWIF more obliquely, caused the strike-slip movement that offset the LRF past Victoria.

It was previously believed that apparently undisturbed glacial deposits lying across the fault showed it had been inactive since the last glaciation, and that displacements on the Devils Mountain fault were accommodated through other faults in the San Juan Islands. However, a 2017 study reported that the Leech River fault has experienced at least two, and possibly more, large, surface-rupturing earthquakes since the last ice age, and that earthquakes on these faults should be expected as a result of displacements on other faults such as the DDMF and SWIF.

== See also ==
- San Juan Valley
