= Farallon =

Farallon (Farallón meaning cliff in the Spanish Language) may refer to:

== Places ==
=== Northern Mariana Islands ===
- Farallon de Medinilla, small island in the Northern Mariana Islands chain
- Farallon de Pajaros (Birds Rock), the northernmost island in the Northern Mariana Islands chain
- Farallon de Torres, a former name of Zealandia Bank in the Northern Mariana Islands chain

=== California ===
- Farallon Island Light, lighthouse on Southeast Farallon Island, California
- Farallon Islands, group of islands and rocks in the Gulf of the Farallones, off the coast of San Francisco, California, USA

=== Alaska ===
- Farallon Steamship Disaster, wooden steamship SS Farallon struck Black Reef in the Cook Inlet in 1910 and sank, in Alaska

=== Panama ===
- Farallon (island), Panama

=== Oceans ===
- Farallon Plate, ancient oceanic plate
- Farallon Trench, ancient oceanic trench on the west coast of North America during the Late Cretaceous period
- Kula-Farallon Ridge, ancient mid-ocean ridge between the Kula and Farallon plates in the Pacific Ocean during the Jurassic period
- Pacific-Farallon Ridge, former mid-ocean ridge between the Pacific and Farallon plates in the Pacific Ocean during the Tertiary period

== Companies ==
- Farallon Capital, American capital management firm
- Farallon Computing, later known as Netopia, known for PhoneNET networking and Timbuktu remote control software
