= Kula Ridge =

Kula Ridge can refer to:

- Kula-Farallon Ridge
- Pacific-Kula Ridge
