= Siletz (disambiguation) =

The Siletz are a nearly extinct tribe of Native Americans from Oregon. Siletz may also refer to:

- Confederated Tribes of Siletz Indians, a federally recognized tribal entity from the U.S. state of Oregon.

- Siletz Reservation, an Indian reservation in Oregon, home to the Confederated Tribes of Siletz

- Siletz Bay, a body of water in Oregon.
- Siletz, Oregon, a city in Oregon.
- Siletz River, a river in Oregon.
- Siletz River Volcanics, a formation of Eocene volcanic deposits on the Oregon coast.
- Siletz terrane: Siletzia, a tectonic terrane that forms the geological basement under northwestern Oregon, southwestern Washington (state), and the southern tip of Vancouver Island.
