= Challis Arc =

Eocene volcanic field

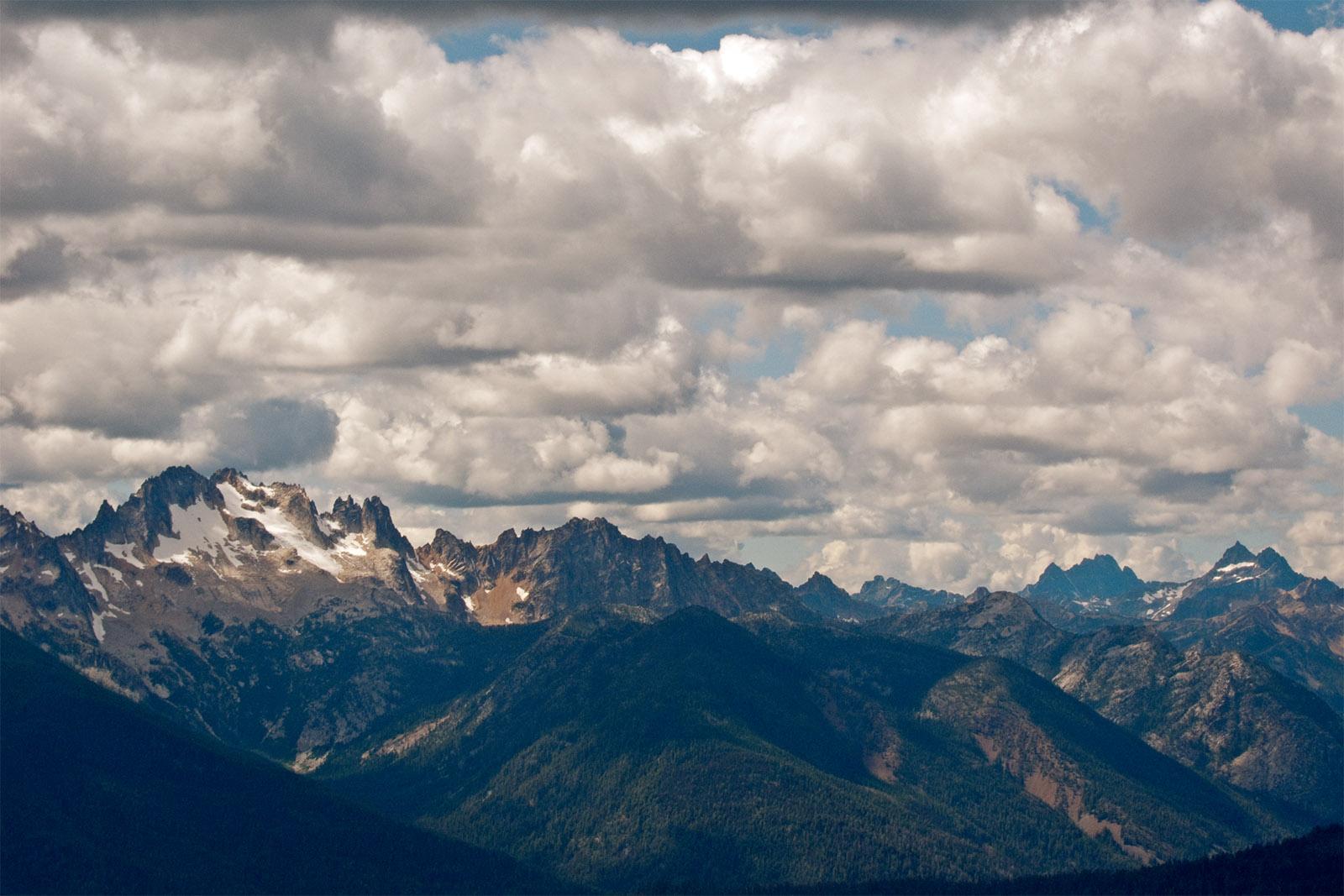
The North Cascades, where granitic plutons from the Challis Arc have been found.

The Challis Arc was an Eocene volcanic field that stretched from southwestern British Columbia through Washington to Idaho, United States. The volcanic field extended between 42 and 49 degrees north latitude and was about 1500 kilometers in length. It exhibited volcanic activity for about 10 million years. Remnants of the Challis Arc are found as granitic plutons in the North Cascades, the Okanagan Highlands and in southcentral Idaho.

It was first theorized in 1979 that the volcanic field formed as a result of subduction of the eastern block of the Kula Plate between 57 and 37 million years ago. More recent publications argue that the Challis Arc was formed by more complex tectonic interactions. One proposed model theorizes that the Farallon plate underwent subduction and imbrication beneath the North American plate to form the Challis Arc. Another model suggests that intracontinental rifting and igneous activity between the Pacific and North American plates formed the Challis arc. By definition, a volcanic arc is formed via subduction, so the Challis Arc's naming as a volcanic arc is a matter of debate among geologists. The current limited availability of historical geochemical data prevents any of the proposed theories from being confirmed or falsified, so there is still no consensus on the Challis Arc's formation.
