= Kula Municipality =

Kula Municipality may refer to:

- Kula, Bulgaria, a town and municipality in Vidin Province
- Kula (Serbia), a town and municipality in Vojvodina

== See also ==
- Kula (disambiguation)
