= Pacific–Kula Ridge =

Former mid-ocean ridge

The Pacific-Kula Ridge is a former mid-ocean ridge that existed between the Pacific and Kula plates in the Pacific Ocean during the Paleogene period. Its appearance was in an east–west direction and the Hawaiian-Emperor seamount chain had its attribution with the ridge. The Pacific-Kula Ridge lay south of the Hawaii hotspot around 80 million years ago, moving northward relative to the hotspot.

== See also ==
- Pacific-Farallon Ridge
