= Kaula =

Kaula may refer to:

== People ==
- Prithvi Nath Kaula (1924–2009), Indian librarian
- William J. Kaula (1871–1953), American watercolor painter
- William M. Kaula (1926–2000), Australian-born American geophysicist

== Other uses ==
- USS Kaula (AG-33), 1938 military cargo ship in the Pacific
- Kaulaʻināiwi Island, Hawaii, U.S.
- Kaʻula, a Hawaiian island, U.S.
- Kaula (Hinduism), a religious tradition
- Kaula (month), the twelfth month in the Nepal Era calendar

== See also ==
- Caula (disambiguation)
- Kula (disambiguation)
- Kaul, a surname that derives from Kaula
