= Caula =

Caula may refer to:

== People ==
- Sigismondo Caula, Italian painter of the Baroque style.
- Victor Hugo Caula, 20th century Argentinian cinematographer.
- Natalie Caula Hauff, journalist and communications professional.

== Botany ==
- Brun Fourca, red French wine grape variety that once grew widely throughout Provence and Southwest France
- CAULA, the EPPO code of Carthamus lanatus
- Counoise, a dark-skinned wine grape grown primarily in the Rhône valley region of France

== See also ==
- Kaula (disambiguation)
