= Pacific–Farallon Ridge =

Spreading ridge during the Late Cretaceous

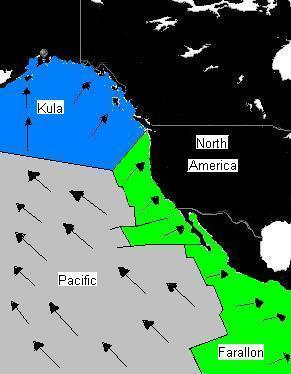
Relative velocity vectors of Pacific, Farallon, and Kula plates 55 million years ago (Black represents present-day land area)

The Pacific-Farallon Ridge was a spreading ridge during the Late Cretaceous that extended 10,000 km in length and separated the Pacific Plate to the west and the Farallon Plate to the east. It ran south from the Pacific-Farallon-Kula triple junction at 51°N to the Pacific-Farallon-Antarctic triple junction at 43°S. As the Farallon Plate subducted obliquely under the North American Plate, the Pacific-Farallon Ridge approached and eventually made contact with the North American Plate about 30 million years ago. On average, this ridge had an equatorial spreading rate of 13.5 cm per year until its eventual collision with the North American Plate. In present day, the Pacific-Farallon Ridge no longer formally exists since the Farallon Plate has been broken up or subducted beneath the North American Plate, and the ridge has segmented, having been mostly subducted as well. The most notable remnant of the Pacific-Farallon Ridge is the 4000 km Pacific-Nazca segment of the East Pacific Rise.

== Characteristics ==
As a spreading ridge, the Pacific-Farallon Ridge was a divergent plate boundary, which is where the two plates are moving away from each other. Partial mantle melting occurs beneath such ridges, which forms new oceanic crust. The Pacific-Farallon Ridge was thought to be a particularly productive spreading ridge, and there are estimates that the ridge and its remnants have formed up to 45% of all oceanic lithosphere since 83 million years ago. The spreading rate of the Pacific-Farallon Ridge has varied throughout its lifetime with an acceleration of its spreading rate occurring 55 to 48 million years ago, around the same time that a significant portion of the Farallon Plate broke to form the Vancouver Plate. The spreading rate decreased once the ridge made contact with the North American Plate 16 million years ago.

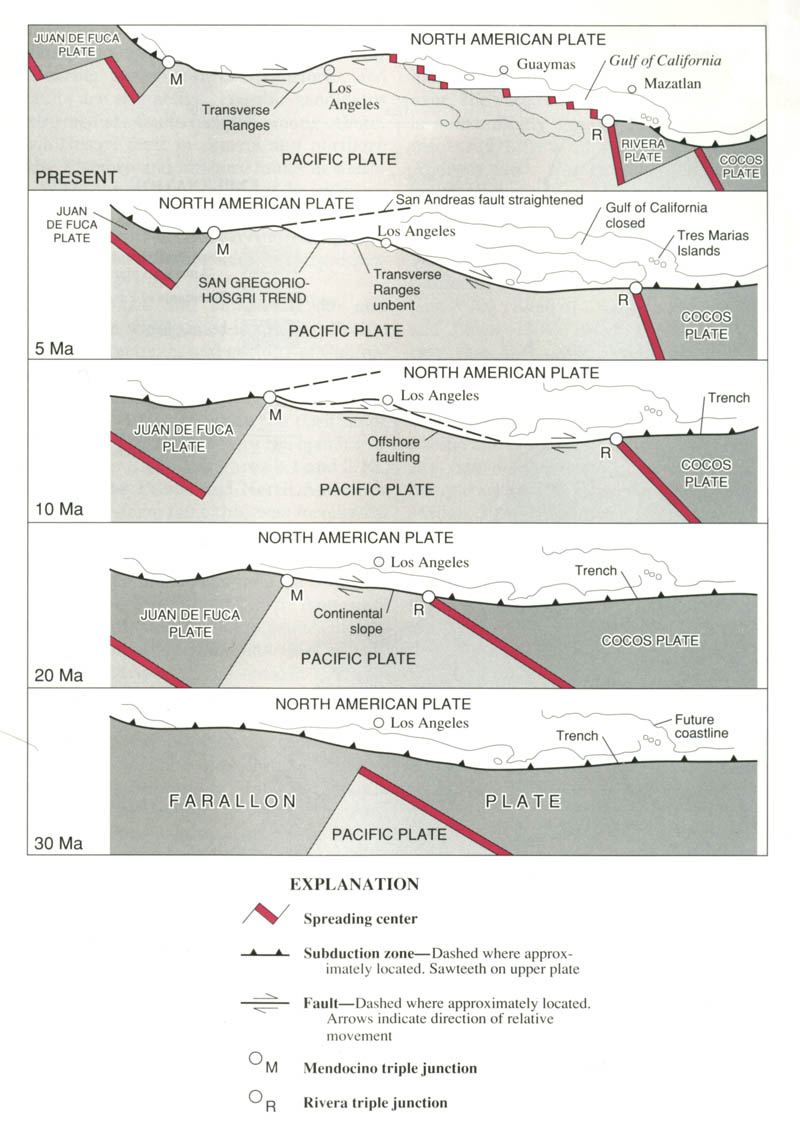
Formation of the Juan de Fuca (including Explorer and Gorda) and Cocos plates (including Rivera) and of the San Andreas Fault from the Farallon plate

== Geologic history ==
As the Farallon Plate made contact with the North American Plate and began subducting beneath it, it fragmented into the Juan de Fuca Plate and Cocos Plate, and then later fragmented further to form the Rivera Plate. Once the Pacific-Farallon Ridge began subducting beneath the North American Plate, the remains of the Farallon Plate broke apart to form the Monterey, Arguello, Magdalena, and Guadelupe Microplates, and the southern portion of the ridge rotated in a clockwise manner. The contact of the ridge with North America marked a transition of the Pacific-Farallon Ridge from being a globally oriented spreading ridge system to a locally oriented one. The distinction between these systems is that slab pull and gravitational gliding forces determine the characteristics of the globally oriented whereas those of the locally oriented are influenced by the contact of the ridge with the North American Plate.

As the Pacific-Farallon Ridge began its subduction underneath the North American plate 30 million years ago, its southern segment, the East Pacific Rise continued spreading. The East Pacific Rise did not begin its subduction under the North American Plate until 20 million years ago, and the presently surviving portion of the East Pacific Rise is the Pacific-Nazca segment. The present-day spreading from the East Pacific Rise dominates the spreading regime in the Central and South Pacific.

== See also ==
- Kula-Farallon Ridge
