= Izanagi plate =

Ancient tectonic plate

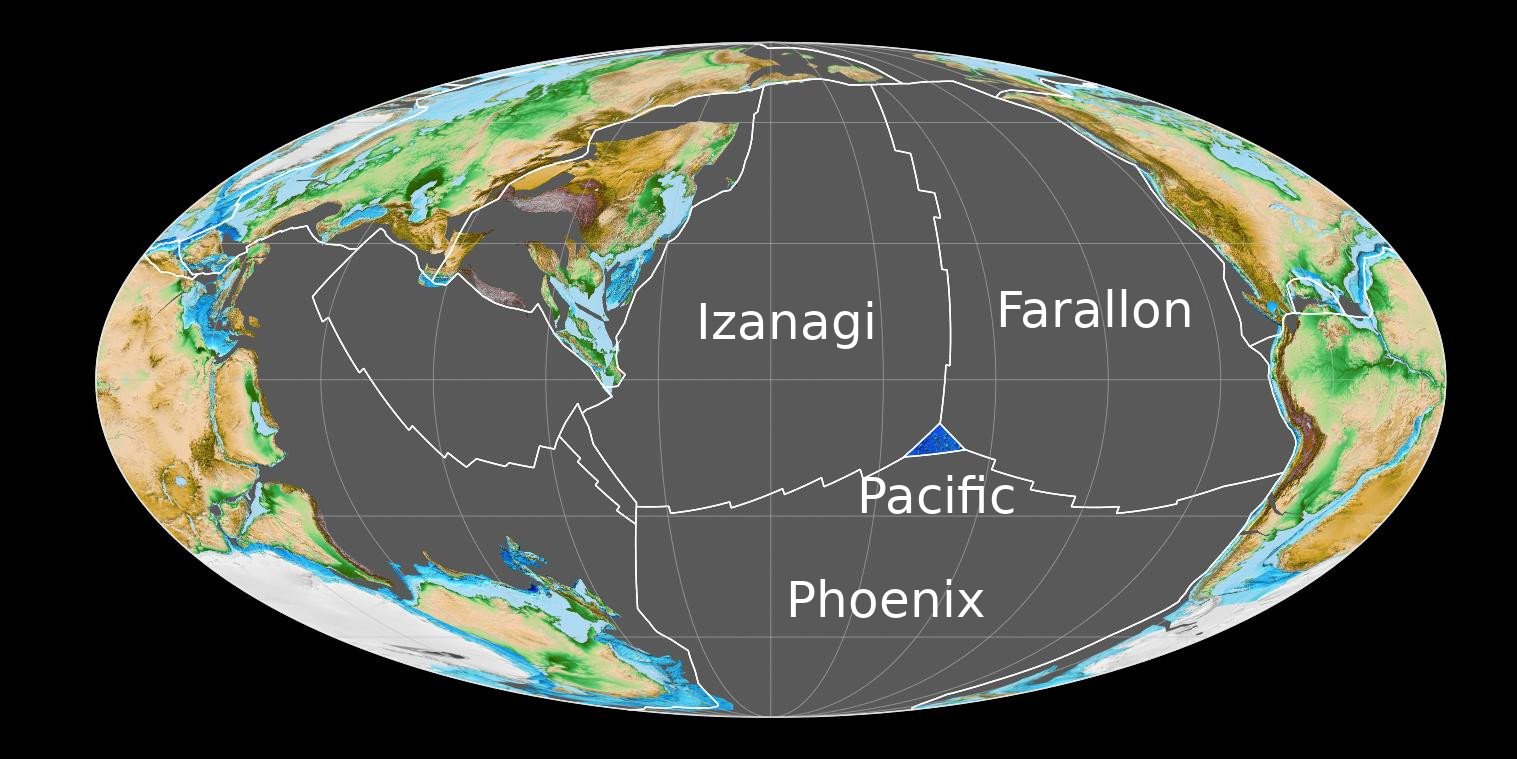
The Izanagi plate in the Early Jurassic (180 Ma)

The Izanagi plate (named after the Shinto god Izanagi) was an ancient tectonic plate, which began subducting beneath the Okhotsk plate 130–100 Ma (million years ago). The rapid plate motion of the Izanagi plate caused northwest Japan and the outer zone of southwest Japan to drift northward. High-pressure metamorphic rocks were formed at the eastern margin of the drifting land mass in the Sanbagawa metamorphic belt, while low-pressure metamorphic rocks were formed at its western margin in the Abukuma metamorphic belt. At approximately 55 Ma, the Izanagi Plate was completely subducted and replaced by the western Pacific plate, which also subducted in a northwestern direction. Subduction-related magmatism took place near the Ryoke belt. No marked tectonics occurred in the Abukuma belt after the change of the subducted plate.

The discovery of an extinct Jurassic–Cretaceous spreading system in the northwest Pacific led to the introduction of the extinct Kula plate in 1972. The Izanagi plate was subsequently introduced in 1982 to explain the geometry of this spreading system. Knowledge of the former Izanagi plate is limited to Mesozoic magnetic lineations on the Pacific plate that preserve the record of this subduction.

== See also ==
- Farallon plate
- List of tectonic plates
- Geology of Japan
