= Geological Society of America Bulletin =

Journal published by the GSA since 1890

- Discipline: Geology
- Language: English

Publication details
- Former name(s): The Bulletin of the Geological Society of America
- History: 1890–present
- Publisher: Geological Society of America (United States)
- Frequency: Bimonthly
- Impact factor: 4.212 (2016)

Standard abbreviations
- ISO 4: Geol. Soc. Am. Bull.

Indexing
- CODEN: BUGMAF
- ISSN: 0016-7606 (print); 1943-2674 (web)
- LCCN: 87644643
- OCLC no.: 613061076

Links
- Journal homepage; Online access; Online archive

The Geological Society of America Bulletin (until 1960 called The Bulletin of the Geological Society of America and also commonly referred to as GSA Bulletin) is a peer-reviewed scientific journal that has been published by the Geological Society of America since 1890. Its first editor was William John McGee. According to the Journal Citation Reports, the journal has a 2016 impact factor of 4.212.

== See also ==
- List of scientific journals in earth and atmospheric sciences
