= Kula, Bihać =

Kula
- Village
- Location within Bosnia and Herzegovina
- Coordinates: 44.8027°N 15.9242°E
- Country: Bosnia and Herzegovina
- Entity: Federation of Bosnia and Herzegovina
- Canton: Una-Sana
- Municipality: Bihać

Area
  - Total: 0.94 sq mi (2.43 km^{2})

Population (2013)
  - Total: 365
  - Density: 389/sq mi (150/km^{2})
- Time zone: UTC+1 (CET)
  - Summer (DST): UTC+2 (CEST)

Kula is a village in the municipality of Bihać, Bosnia and Herzegovina.

== Demographics ==
According to the 2013 census, its population was 365.

Ethnicity in 2013
Ethnicity	Number	Percentage
Bosniaks	328	89.9%
Croats	2	0.5%
other/undeclared	35	9.6%
Total	365	100%
