= Siletz River Volcanics =

Sequence of basaltic pillow lavas that make up part of Siletzia

- Stratigraphic range: Selandian-Ypresian (Tiffanian-Bridgerian); 59.6–47.6 Ma
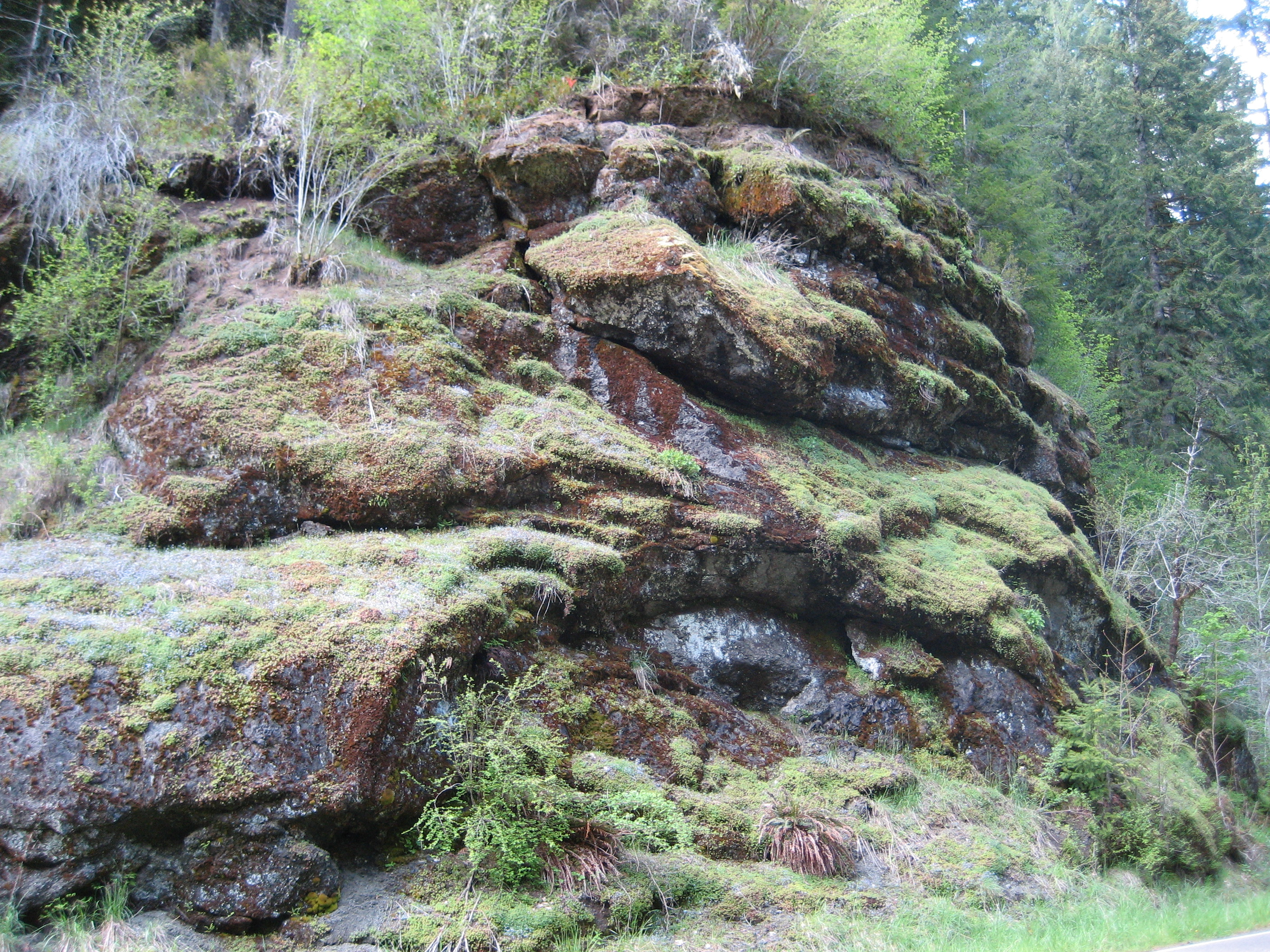
- Exposed pillow lava in the Northern range
- Type: Formation
- Underlies: Yamhill Formation

Lithology
- Primary: Sills of tholeitic to alkalic basalts
- Other: Tuff breccia, siltstone, sandstone

Location
- Coordinates: 44.9°N 123.4°W
- Approximate paleocoordinates: 47.0°N 107.5°W
- Region: Benton, Coos, Douglas, Lane, Lincoln, Polk, Tillamook, Washington & Yamhill Counties, Oregon
- Country: United States

Type section
- Named for: Siletz River
- Siletz River Volcanics (the United States) Siletz River Volcanics (Oregon)

The Siletz River Volcanics, located in the Oregon Coast Range, United States, are a sequence of basaltic pillow lavas that make up part of Siletzia. The basaltic pillow lavas originally came from submarine volcanoes that existed during the Eocene.

== Description ==
The Paleocene to Eocene volcanics consist of volcanism flows and sills of tholeitic to alkalic basalts with associated tuff breccia, siltstone and sandstone. The flows are vesiculated with zeolite filled amygdules.

The volcanics originated as oceanic crust and seamounts. Potassium argon dating gives ages of 58.1 ± 1.5 to 50.7 ± 3.1 Ma; Selandian to Ypresian.

The sequence has been divided into a lower pillowed tholeiitic unit and an upper porphyritic alkali basalt unit.

The volcanics occur in the following counties of western Oregon: Benton, Coos, Douglas, Lane, Lincoln, Polk, Tillamook, Washington and Yamhill.

=== Fossil content ===
The sedimentary beds at the Ellendale Basalt and Portland Cement Company Quarries, interbeds in the upper part of the Siletz River volcanics, have provided fossils of the archaeogastropods Pleurotomaria (Entemnotrochus) baldwini, P. (E.) schencki and P. (E.) siletzensis.

== See also ==
- Coldwater Beds of British Columbia
- Golden Valley Formation of North Dakota
- Hanna Formation of Wyoming
- Indian Meadows Formation of Wyoming
- Margaret Formation of Ellesmere Island, Northwest Territories and Nunavut
- Nanjemoy Formation of Virginia, Maryland and District of Columbia
- Paskapoo Formation of Alberta
- Wasatch Formation of Colorado, Idaho, Montana, New Mexico, Wyoming and Utah
- Washakie Formation of Colorado and Wyoming
- Willwood Formation of Wyoming
