= Geology (journal) =

Scientific journal

- Discipline: Geology
- Language: English

Publication details
- History: 1973–present
- Publisher: Geological Society of America (United States)
- Frequency: Monthly
- Impact factor: 4.6 (2025)

Standard abbreviations
- ISO 4: Geology

Indexing
- ISSN: 0091-7613 (print); 1943-2682 (web)

Links
- Journal homepage; Archives

Geology is a peer-reviewed publication of the Geological Society of America (GSA). GSA stated (in 2006) that it is the most widely read scientific journal in the field of earth science. It is published monthly, with each issue containing twenty or more articles.

One of the goals of the journal is to provide a forum for shorter articles (four pages each) and less focus on purely academic research–type articles. According to the Journal Citation Reports, the journal had a 2024 impact factor of 4.6. The journal is indexed in Scopus and SCImago.

== See also ==
- List of geology journals
- List of scientific journals
  - List of earth and atmospheric sciences journals
