= Anne Tréhu =

American geophysicist

Anne Martine Tréhu
- Education: Massachusetts Institute of Technology; Woods Hole Oceanographic Institution
- Scientific career
- Workplaces: Oregon State University
- Thesis: Seismicity and structure of the Orozco transform fault from ocean bottom seismic observations (1982)

Anne M. Tréhu is a professor at Oregon State University known for her research on geodynamic processes, especially along plate boundaries. She is an elected fellow of the American Geophysical Union.

== Education and career ==
Tréhu has a B.A. from Princeton University (1975). In 1982, she earned her Ph.D. from Massachusetts Institute of Technology and Woods Hole Oceanographic Institution where she worked on the seismicity of the Orozco transform fault. From 1982 until 1984 she was a National Research Council postdoc at the United States Geological Survey in Woods Hole. Tréhu joined the faculty at Oregon State University in 1987 and, as of 2021, she is a professor at Oregon State University in the College of Earth, Ocean, and Atmospheric Sciences.

== Research ==
Tréhu's research centers on studying earthquakes, especially in the Cascadia subduction zone where she investigates where slip and ground shaking will occur in the future earthquakes in the region. As far back as graduate school her work tracking the magnitude and location of earthquakes was noted in the local papers. She uses a network of instruments that track large and small earthquakes, information that will help define when a large earthquake will occur. Tréhu has examined how earthquakes form as continental plates move beneath an adjacent tectonic plate.

=== Selected publications ===
- Tréhu, Anne M.; Torres, Marta E.; Moore, Gregory F.; Suess, Erwin; Bohrmann, Gerhard (1999-10-01). "Temporal and spatial evolution of a gas hydrate–bearing accretionary ridge on the Oregon continental margin". Geology. 27 (10): 939–942. Bibcode:1999Geo....27..939T. doi:10.1130/0091-7613(1999)027<0939:TASEOA>2.3.CO;2. ISSN 0091-7613.
- Tréhu, A.M.; Long, P.E.; Torres, M.E.; Bohrmann, G.; Rack, F.R.; Collett, T.S.; Goldberg, D.S.; Milkov, A.V.; Riedel, M.; Schultheiss, P. (2004-06-15). "Three-dimensional distribution of gas hydrate beneath southern Hydrate Ridge: constraints from ODP Leg 204". Earth and Planetary Science Letters. 222 (3–4): 845–862. Bibcode:2004E&PSL.222..845T. doi:10.1016/j.epsl.2004.03.035.
- Tréhu, Anne M.; Flemings, Peter B.; Bangs, Nathan L.; Chevallier, Johanna; Gràcia, Eulàlia; Johnson, Joel E.; Liu, C.-S.; Liu, Xiaoli; Riedel, Michael; Torres, Marta E. (2004-12-16). "Feeding methane vents and gas hydrate deposits at south Hydrate Ridge: FEEDING METHANE VENTS AND GAS HYDRATES". Geophysical Research Letters. 31 (23). doi:10.1029/2004GL021286. hdl:10261/75996. S2CID 14794733.
- Tréhu, Anne M.; Blakely, Richard J.; Williams, Mark C. (2012). "Subducted seamounts and recent earthquakes beneath the central Cascadia forearc". Geology. 40 (2): 103–106. Bibcode:2012Geo....40..103T. doi:10.1130/G32460.1. ISSN 1943-2682.

== Awards and honors ==
- Fellow, American Geophysical Union (2008)
