= Straight Creek Fault =

Fault line in Washington, United States and British Columbia, Canada

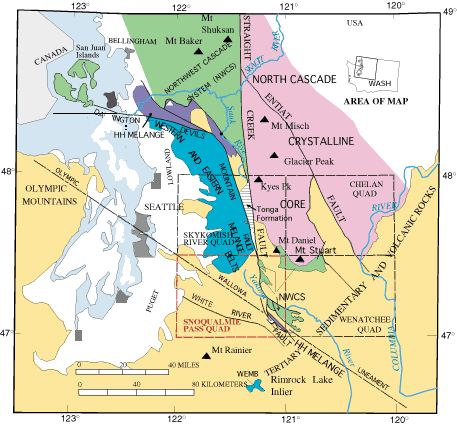
Location of SCF and related faults in the North Cascades.

The Straight Creek Fault (SCF) is the principal north-south strike-slip fault in the state of Washington, with a minimum of 90 kilometers (54 miles) of right-lateral offset, and a major geological structure in the North Cascade mountains, where it separates the pre-Cenozoic igneous and metamorphic rocks of the North Cascades on the east from the younger accreted terranes on the west. The SCF can be traced from its junction with the Olympic–Wallowa Lineament (OWL) near the town of Easton northward into British Columbia, where it joins the Fraser River Fault system; the combined system (over 570 km [340 miles] long) is known as the Fraser—Straight Creek Fault system (FSCF).

No trace of the SCF has been found south of the OWL. Some geologists believe it does continue south, with all traces covered by more recent volcanic deposits. Others have speculated that it simply ends, or turns and aligns with the OWL, or has been offset elsewhere. (See discussion at Olympic–Wallowa Lineament#Straight Creek Fault.)

The SCF offsets the older NNW striking Entiat, Ross Lake, and Chewack-Pasayten faults, but not certain younger features, the period of its strike-slip activity thus being bracketed between 47 and 41 million years ago (in the Eocene epoch), just after the wedge of crust now carrying the Olympic Mountains pushed into the continental margin. It has been suggested that initiation of the SCF may be due to events on the Kula Plate.

The SCF seems to be related to the Darrington—Devils Mountain Fault (DDMF), which runs due east from the southern end of Vancouver Island to the small town of Darrington, then turns nearly south to converge with the SCF near its intersection with the OWL. This bowing appears to be due to the approaching Olympic Mountains. An anomalous rock formation (the Helena—Haystack Melange) just north of Darrington has been correlated with similar rock south of Easton, suggesting considerable right-lateral strike-slip motion on the DDMF. Motion on both faults seems to have been contemporaneous; the relationship between the two is not understood.

== See also ==
- Geology of the Pacific Northwest
- North Cascades
- Olympic–Wallowa Lineament
