= Kula, Travnik =

Kula
- Village
- Location within Bosnia and Herzegovina
- Coordinates: 44.2239405°N 17.7203093°E
- Country: Bosnia and Herzegovina
- Entity: Federation of Bosnia and Herzegovina
- Canton: Central Bosnia
- Municipality: Travnik

Area
  - Total: 0.66 sq mi (1.70 km^{2})

Population (2013)
  - Total: 528
  - Density: 804/sq mi (311/km^{2})
- Time zone: UTC+1 (CET)
  - Summer (DST): UTC+2 (CEST)

Kula is a village in the municipality of Travnik, Bosnia and Herzegovina.

== Demographics ==
According to the 2013 census, its population was 528.

Ethnicity in 2013
| Ethnicity | Number | Percentage |
|---|---|---|
| Croats | 525 | 99.4% |
| Serbs | 2 | 0.4% |
| other/undeclared | 1 | 0.2% |
| Total | 528 | 100% |
