= Metchosin Igneous Complex =

Geologic formation in southwestern British Columbia, Canada

The Metchosin Igneous Complex is an ophiolite sequence in southwestern British Columbia, Canada, located at the southern end of Vancouver Island. It is the northernmost expression of the Siletzia terrane, consisting of three rock units: a basaltic sequence, a sheeted dike complex and gabbro stocks.

== See also ==
- Volcanism of Western Canada
