= Kula, Zenica =

Kula
- Village
- Location within Bosnia and Herzegovina
- Coordinates: 44.2198636°N 17.9530098°E
- Country: Bosnia and Herzegovina
- Entity: Federation of Bosnia and Herzegovina
- Canton: Zenica-Doboj
- Municipality: Zenica

Area
  - Total: 0.37 sq mi (0.97 km^{2})

Population (2013)
  - Total: 92
  - Density: 250/sq mi (95/km^{2})
- Time zone: UTC+1 (CET)
  - Summer (DST): UTC+2 (CEST)

Kula is a village in the City of Zenica, Bosnia and Herzegovina.

== Demographics ==
According to the 2013 census, its population was 92.

Ethnicity in 2013
Ethnicity	Number	Percentage
Croats	59	64.1%
Bosniaks	21	22.8%
Serbs	4	4.3%
other/undeclared	8	8.7%
Total	92	100%
