= USS Kaula =

Cargo ship of the United States Navy

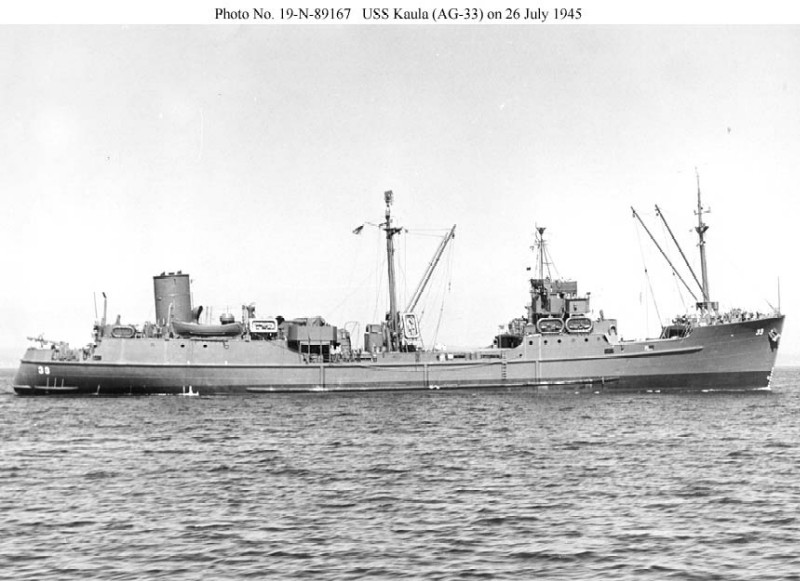

History

United States
- Name: USS Kaula
- Namesake: Kaʻula Island in Hawaii
- Builder: Henry Robb Ltd
- Launched: 1938
- Acquired: 3 January 1941
- Commissioned: 22 January
- Decommissioned: 14 January 1946
- Stricken: 12 March 1946
- Fate: Sold

General characteristics
- Displacement: 2,100 tons
- Length: 267 ft (81 m)
- Beam: 38 ft 3 in (11.66 m)
- Speed: 12 kn (22 km/h)
- Complement: 70
- Armament: 1 x 4"/50 caliber gun; 2 x 3"/50 caliber guns; 4 x 0.5 in (12.7 mm) machine guns

USS Kaula (AG-33) was built in 1938 by Henry Robb Ltd, in Leith, Scotland. She was acquired by the U.S. Navy as Cubahama 3 January 1941 from her owner, Balboa Shipping Company of New York and renamed Kaula 15 January then commissioned at Baltimore, Maryland 22 January.

Sailing to Hampton Roads, Virginia, 25 January, Kaula departed 4 February for Hawaii, via the Panama Canal and the West Coast, reaching Pearl Harbor 17 March. Prior to the outbreak of war in the Pacific, she carried cargo from Pearl Harbor and Honolulu to various islands in the Hawaiian chain and to Johnston and Palmyra Islands. During the Japanese raid on Pearl Harbor 7 December, she was en route to Palmyra Island.

Throughout the war with the Japanese Empire, Kaula operated out of Pearl Harbor and Honolulu to principal Hawaiian Islands and to outlying islands west to Midway and south to Palmyra. Usually sailing in convoy, she ranged the Hawaiian Sea frontier carrying military equipment, ammunition, and contingents of Seabees until she sailed for the United States on 18 May 1945, arriving at Seattle, Washington on 26 May.

Following 2 months of overhaul, Kaula departed Seattle 31 July on the first of several voyages to Alaska. Assigned to the 13th Naval District, she steamed for the US Coast Guard to Ketchikan, Juneau, Seward, Kodiak, and Dutch Harbor before returning to Seattle 18 September. She operated in Puget Sound and the Strait of Juan de Fuca before steaming to Blake Island Anchorage, Washington, 6 December and decommissioning 14 January 1946. Struck from the Naval Vessel Register on 12 March, Kaula was transferred to the Maritime Commission 15 July for sale to her former owner.
