= Pacific plate =

Oceanic tectonic plate under the Pacific Ocean

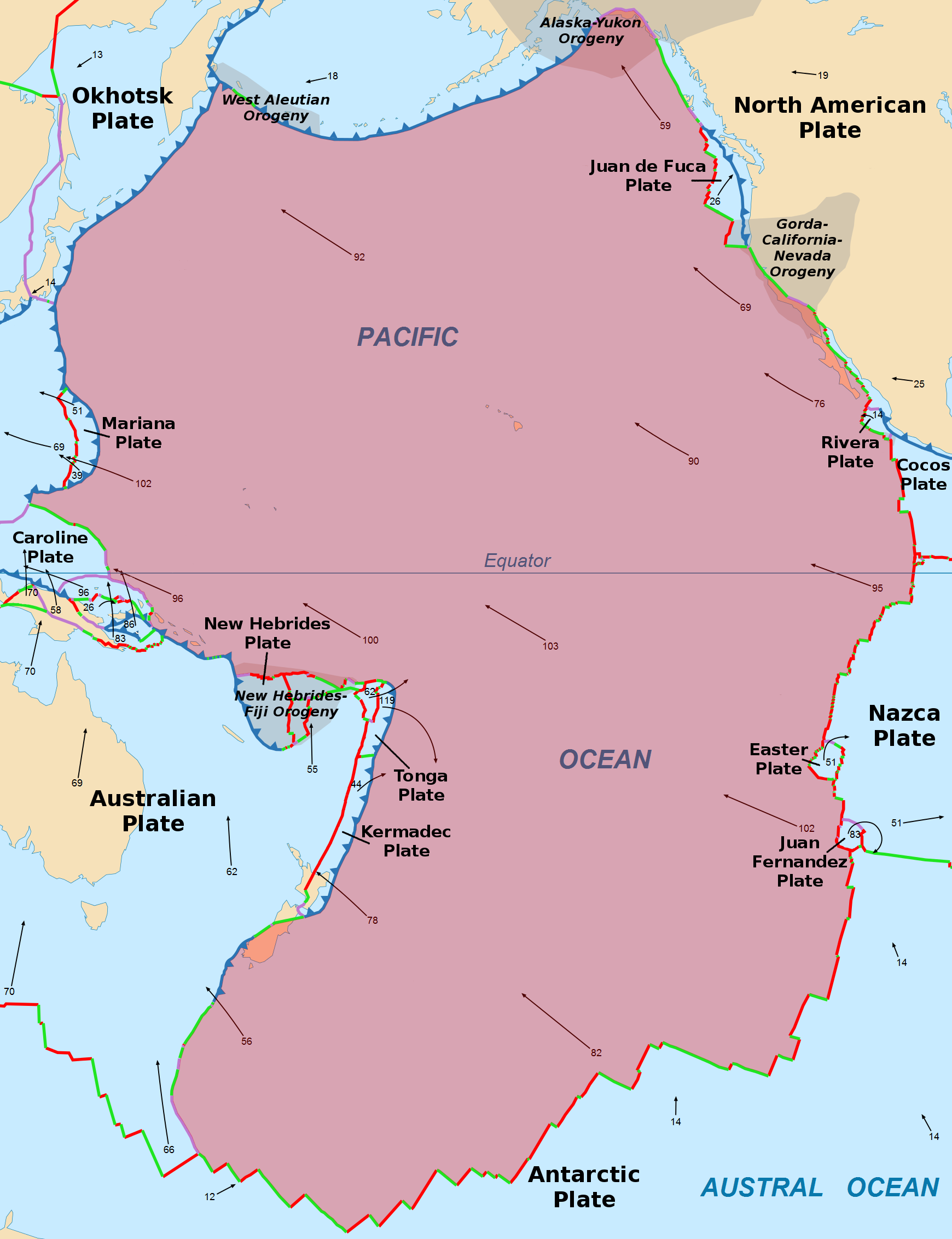
- Type: Major
- Approximate area: 103,300,000 km^{2} (39,900,000 sq mi)
- Movement^{1}: north-west
- Speed^{1}: 56–102 mm (2.2–4.0 in)/year
- Features: Baja California peninsula, Southern California, Hawaiian Islands, Pacific Ocean
- ^{1}Relative to the African plate

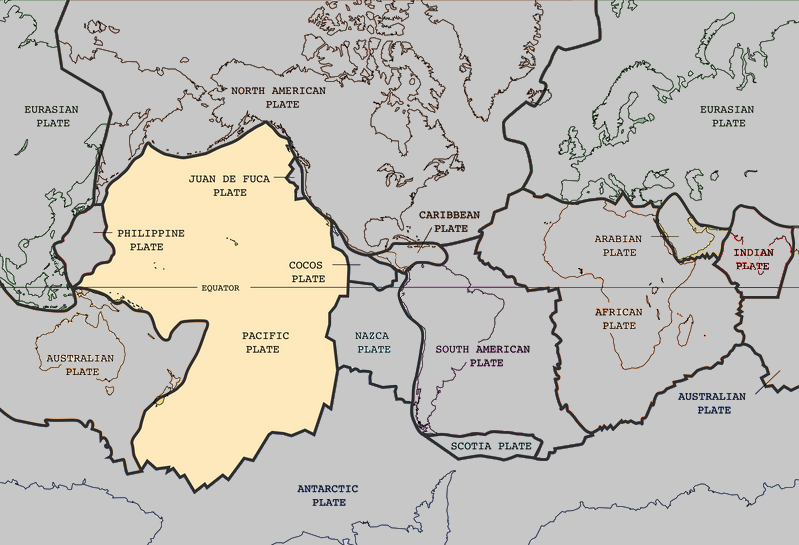
The Pacific plate and other principal plates of Earth's lithosphere

The Pacific plate is an oceanic tectonic plate that lies beneath the Pacific Ocean. At 103 million km^{2} (40 million sq mi), it is the largest tectonic plate.

The plate first came into existence as a microplate 190 million years ago, at the triple junction between the Farallon, Phoenix, and Izanagi plates. The Pacific plate subsequently grew to where it underlies most of the Pacific Ocean basin. This reduced the Farallon plate to a few remnants along the west coast of the Americas and the Phoenix plate to a small remnant near the Drake Passage, and destroyed the Izanagi plate by subduction under Asia.

The Pacific plate contains an interior hot spot forming the Hawaiian Islands.

== Boundaries ==
The north-eastern side is a divergent boundary with the Explorer plate, the Juan de Fuca plate and the Gorda plate forming respectively the Explorer Ridge, the Juan de Fuca Ridge and the Gorda Ridge. In the middle of the eastern side is a transform boundary with the North American plate along the San Andreas Fault, and a divergent boundary with the Cocos plate. The south-eastern side is a divergent boundary with the Nazca plate forming the East Pacific Rise.

The southern side is a divergent boundary with the Antarctic plate forming the Pacific–Antarctic Ridge.

In the south-west, the Pacific plate has a complex but generally convergent boundary with the Indo-Australian plate, subducting under it north of New Zealand forming the Tonga Trench and the Kermadec Trench. The Alpine Fault marks a transform boundary between the two plates, and further south the Indo-Australian plate subducts under the Pacific plate forming the Puysegur Trench. The southern part of Zealandia, which is to the east of this boundary, is the plate's largest block of continental crust. Hillis and Müller are reported to consider the Bird's Head plate to be moving in unison with the Pacific plate, but Bird considers them to be unconnected.

The northern side is a convergent boundary subducting under the North American plate forming the Aleutian Trench and the corresponding Aleutian Islands (see also: Aleutian Arc).

== Paleo-geology of the Pacific plate ==
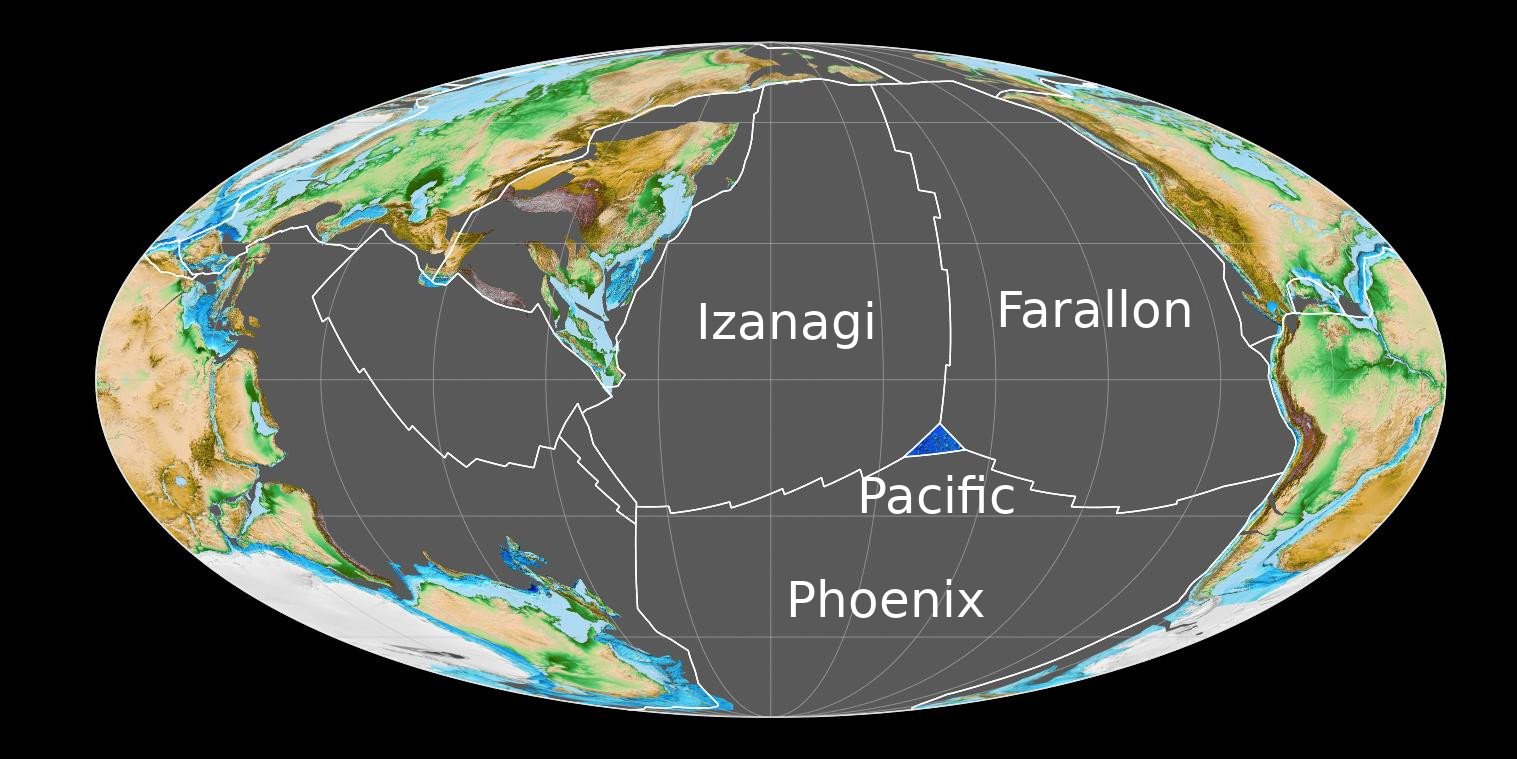
The Pacific plate began forming when the triple junction at the center of Panthalassa destabilized about 190 million years ago.

The Pacific plate is almost entirely oceanic crust, but it contains some continental crust in New Zealand, Baja California, and coastal California.

The Pacific plate has the distinction of showing one of the largest areal sections of the oldest members of seabed geology being entrenched into eastern Asian oceanic trenches. A geological map of the Pacific Ocean seabed shows not only the geologic sequences, and associated Ring of Fire zones on the ocean's perimeters, but the various ages of the seafloor in a stairstep fashion, youngest to oldest, the oldest being consumed into the Asian oceanic trenches. The oldest part disappearing by way of the plate tectonics cycle is early-Cretaceous (145 to 137 million years ago).

The Pacific plate originated at the triple junction of the three main oceanic plates of Panthalassa, the Farallon, Phoenix, and Izanagi plates, around 190 million years ago. The plate formed because the triple junction had converted to an unstable form surrounded on all sides by transform faults, due to the development of a kink in one of the plate boundaries. The "Pacific Triangle", the oldest part of the Pacific plate, created during the initial stages of plate formation, is located just east of the Mariana Trench. The growth of the Pacific plate reduced the Farallon plate to a few remnants along the west coast of the Americas (such as the Juan de Fuca plate) and the Phoenix plate to a small remnant near the Drake Passage, and destroyed the Izanagi plate by subduction under Asia.
