= Kula plate =

Former oceanic tectonic plate

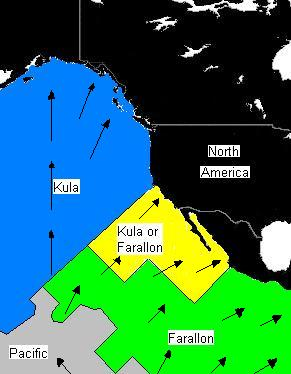
Plate distribution 64–74 Ma (Black represents present-day land area)

The Kula plate was an oceanic tectonic plate under the northern Pacific Ocean south of the Near Islands segment of the Aleutian Islands. It has been subducted under the North American plate at the Aleutian Trench, being replaced by the Pacific plate.

The name Kula is from a Tlingit language word meaning "all gone". As the name suggests, the Kula plate was entirely subducted around 48 Ma and today only a slab in the mantle under the Bering Sea remains. There is some evidence of a Resurrection plate broken off from the Kula plate and also subducted.

== Geological history ==
The Kula plate began subducting under the Pacific Northwest region of North America during the Late Cretaceous period much like the Pacific plate does today, supporting a large volcanic arc system from northern Washington to southwestern Yukon called the Coast Range Arc.

There was a triple junction of three ridges between the Kula plate to the north, the Pacific plate to the west and the Farallon plate to the east. The Kula plate was subducted under the North American plate at a relatively steep angle, so that the Canadian Rockies are primarily composed of thrust sedimentary sheets with relatively little contribution of continental uplift, while the American Rockies are characterized by significant continental uplift in response to the shallow subduction of the Farallon plate.

About 55 million years ago, the Kula plate began an even more northerly motion. Riding on the Kula plate was the Pacific Rim Terrane consisting of volcanic and sedimentary rock. It was scraped off and plastered against the continental margin, forming what is today Vancouver Island.

By 40 million years ago, the compressional force of the Kula plate ceased. The existence of the Kula plate was inferred from the westward bend in the alternating pattern of magnetic anomalies in the Pacific plate.

== See also ==
- Farallon plate
- Kula–Farallon Ridge
- Pacific–Kula Ridge
- Izanagi plate
