= Kula–Farallon Ridge =

Ancient mid-ocean ridge

The Kula-Farallon Ridge was an ancient mid-ocean ridge that existed between the Kula and Farallon plates in the Pacific Ocean during the Jurassic period. There was a small piece of this ridge off the Pacific Northwest 43 million years ago. The rest of the ridge has since been subducted beneath Alaska.

In its early stages of development, the Kula-Farallon Ridge sheared pieces of oceanic rock off the coast of California. When the Kula–Farallon Ridge was in the area where Washington and Oregon are now, basaltic lava erupted there. Some of the basaltic lava is now part of the Olympic Peninsula.

== See also ==
- Hawaiian-Emperor seamount chain
- Meiji Seamount
