= Owl (disambiguation) =

The owl is a bird of prey.

Owl, Owls, or OWL may also refer to:

== Arts and entertainment ==
=== Fictional entities ===
- Owl (comics), the name of several comics characters
- Owl (Winnie the Pooh)

=== Film and television ===
- Owl (film), a 2003 Japanese black comedy
- The Owl (1927 film), a German silent film
- The Owl (1991 film), an American television film
- The Owl (TV series), a French series of animated shorts for children
- OWL/TV, a Canadian children's educational television series 1985–1994
- "Owls" (Millennium), a television episode

=== Literature ===
- "The Owl" (fairy tale), a German fairy tale collected by the Brothers Grimm
- OWL (magazine), a Canadian children's educational magazine; basis of the OWL/TV series
- The Owl (magazine): A Wednesday Journal of Politics and Society, a satirical society newspaper published in London 1864–1870

=== Music ===
- Owl (band), a Los Angeles–based hard-rock band, and their self-titled 2009 album
- Owls (band), a Chicago-based rock band
  - Owls (album), 2001
- Of Wondrous Legends, or O.W.L., an American psych folk band, and their self-titled 1971 album
- The Four Owls, or The Owls, a British hip hop group
- The Owl (album), by the Zac Brown Band, 2019
- Owl, an album by Qwel & Maker, 2010
- "Owl", a song by the Cat Empire from Where the Angels Fall, 2023

=== Other uses in arts and entertainment ===
- Owl (sculpture), a public statue in Canberra, Australia
- NASPA Word List, or OWL, the official word list for Scrabble in North America

== Businesses and organizations ==
- Older Women's League, an American organization
- Order of Owls, an American fraternal order
- Owl Labs, a company that builds remote conferencing devices
- The Owl Drug Company, an American drug retailer

== Languages ==
- Owl (hieroglyph), an Egyptian language uniliteral
- Old Welsh, ISO 639 language code owl

== Military ==
- HMS Owl, the name of a British ship and a shore establishment
- USS Owl, the name of two American ships
- CSS Owl, a Confederate States Navy blockade runner in the American Civil War
- Curtiss O-52 Owl, an American observation aircraft before and during World War II

== People ==
- Owl Chapman, a short-board surfer
- Owl Fisher (born 1991), an Icelandic journalist
- Owl Goingback (born 1959), American author
- Henry Owl (1895–1980) Cherokee educator, activist, historian
- Lula Owl Gloyne (1891–1985), born as Louisiana Leta Owl, Cherokee nurse

== Places ==
- Owl Creek (disambiguation)
- Owl Mountains, Poland
- Owl Peak, Wyoming, U.S.
- Owl River (disambiguation)
- Olympic–Wallowa Lineament (OWL), a physiographic feature in Washington State, U.S.
- Ostwestfalen-Lippe (OWL), an area in North Rhine-Westphalia, Germany

== Science and technology ==
=== Astronomy ===
- NGC 457, an open star cluster also known as the Owl Cluster
- Owl Nebula, in the constellation Ursa Major
- Overwhelmingly Large Telescope, a proposed optical telescope

=== Computing ===
- Object Windows Library, a C++ object-oriented application framework
- Online Watch Link, a commercial web application for Neighbourhood Watch schemes
- Openwall Project (Owl), a security-enhanced Linux distribution
- Owl (AOL), a user-generated content site created by AOL in 2010
- Owl Scientific Computing, a software system for scientific and engineering computing
- Web Ontology Language, a family of knowledge representation languages

== Sports ==
- Bielawa Owls, an American football team based in Bielawa, Poland
- Chicago Owls, a defunct professional American football team based in Chicago
- Clinton Owls, a defunct minor league baseball team, based in Clinton, Iowa (1937–1938)
- Dayton Owls, a minor league ice hockey team in the International Hockey League for the 1977–1978 season
- Florida Atlantic Owls, the athletics teams of Florida Atlantic University
- Forest City Owls, a baseball team in the Coastal Plain League, a collegiate summer league
- Grand Rapids Owls, a defunct International Hockey League team
- Kennesaw State Owls, the athletic teams of Kennesaw State University
- Orem Owlz, a minor league baseball team
- Owls, the athletic teams of Keene State College
- Owls, the athletic teams of the University of Maine at Presque Isle
- Lunar Owls BC, a basketball club based in Miami, Florida
- Rice Owls, the athletic teams of Rice University
- Temple Owls, the athletic teams of Temple University
- Topeka Owls, a defunct Western Association minor league baseball team based in Topeka, Kansas
- Uni-Norths Owls, an Australian rugby union club
- Owls, the athletic teams of Westfield State University
- Sheffield Wednesday F.C., an English football club nicknamed "The Owls"
- OWLS AC Leicester, an English athletics club
- Guildford Owls, an Australian rugby league club
- Overwatch League, a professional esports league

== Transportation ==
- OWLS, a mnemonic used by general aviation airplane pilots
- Owl service, or public transport night service
- Night Owl (train), between Boston and Washington, D.C.
- Owl a train on the Delaware, Lackawanna and Western Railroad and later Erie Lackawanna Railway
- Owl Limited a train of the Southern Pacific Transportation Company
- Aspark Owl, a Japanese electric sports car

== Other uses ==
- Owl butterfly, a member of the genus Caligo
- Olympic–Wallowa Lineament, a geological feature in the state of Washington
- Online Writing Lab, an extension of a university writing center
- Our Whole Lives, a comprehensive sexuality curriculum from the Unitarian Universalist Association and the United Church of Christ

== See also ==
- Owl Club (disambiguation)
- Night owl (person), a nocturnal person
- OWLeS, the Ontario Winter Lake-effect Systems study project
