= Owl Creek =

Owl Creek may refer to:

- Owl Creek (Colorado)
- Owl Creek (Arapahoe Creek tributary), a stream in Missouri
- Owl Creek (North Fork Charrette Creek), a stream in Missouri
- Owl Creek (North River), a stream in Missouri
- Owl Creek (Sni-A-Bar Creek), a stream in Missouri
- Owl Creek (Sugar Creek), a stream in Missouri
- Owl Creek, North Carolina, an unincorporated community
- Owl Creek (Wisconsin), a stream in Wisconsin
- Owl Creek Mountains, Wyoming
- Owl Creek, Wyoming, a census-designated place
- Owl Creek, a firing range at Fort Cavazos, Texas

== See also ==
- "An Occurrence at Owl Creek Bridge", a short story by Ambrose Bierce (also adapted into a film of the same name)
