= BFZ =

BFZ may refer to

- Blanco fracture zone off the coast of Oregon, United States
- Brawley Fault Zone near the Salton Sea in Southern California, United States
- Brothers Fault Zone in the state of Oregon, United States
