= Lake Dexter =

Lake Dexter may refer to:

- Lake Dexter (Polk County, Florida)
- Lake Dexter (Wisconsin)

== See also ==
- Dexter Reservoir
