= Kieran Suckling =

American conservationist (born 1964)

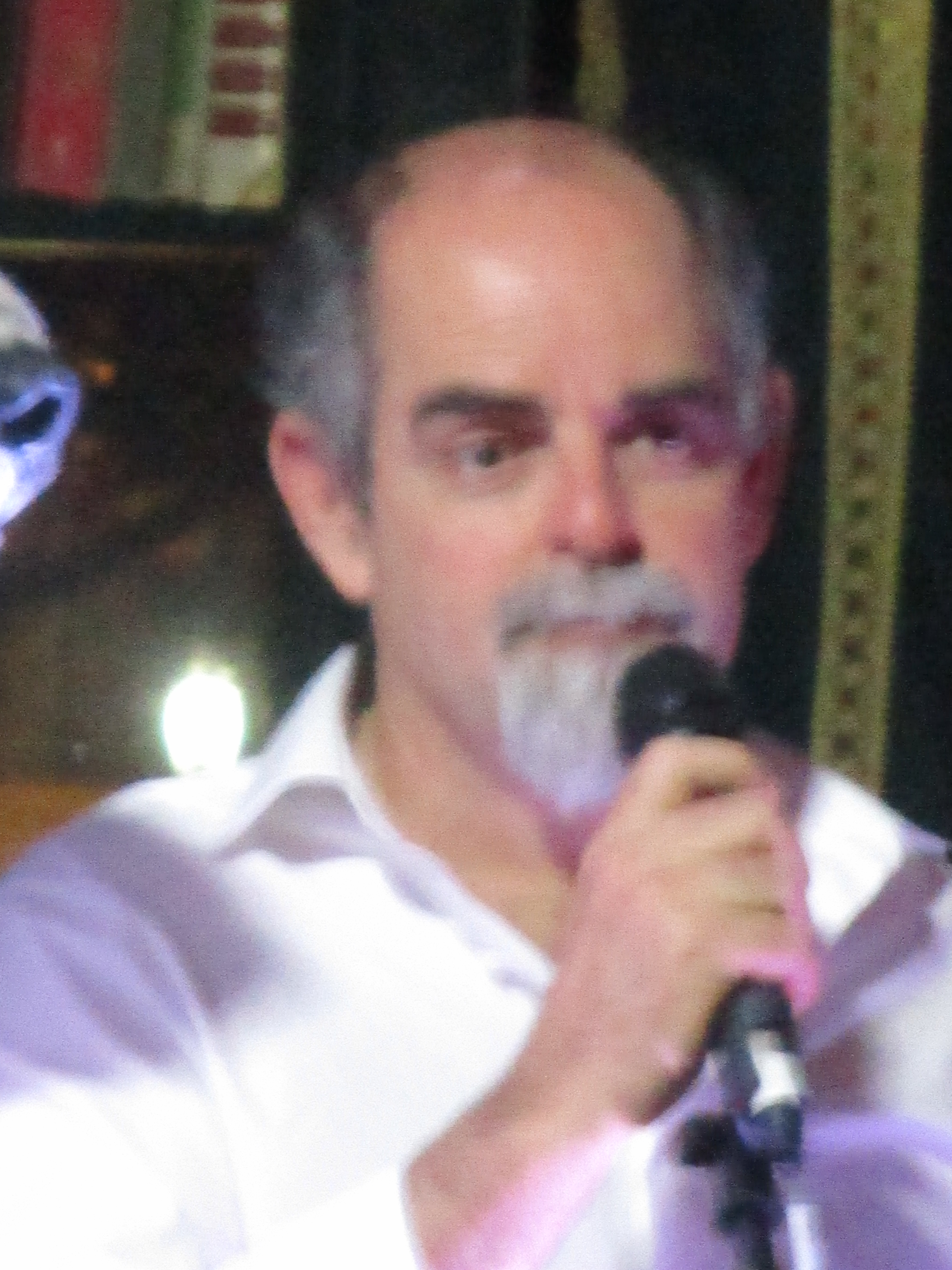
- Born: 1964 (age 61–62)
- Education: College of the Holy Cross (BA); Stanford University; Columbia University; Stony Brook University (MA, PhD)
- Occupation: Environmental activist
- Known for: Center for Biological Diversity

Kierán Suckling (born 1964) is an American environmental activist who is one of the founders and the executive director of the Center for Biological Diversity, a nonprofit conservation group known for its protection of endangered species, wilderness, clean air, and clean water.

The New Yorker dubbed the Center as "the most important radical environmental group in the country" and Suckling a "trickster, philosopher, publicity hound, master strategist, and unapologetic pain in the ass." The LA Weekly calls the Center "pound for pound, dollar for dollar, the most effective conservation organization in the country," and says of Suckling: "Rimbaud reinvented poetry. Kierán Suckling would do the same with environmentalism."

The Center, which has secured protection for over 700 endangered species and 475,000,000 acres (192,225,680 ha) of habitat in the U.S., works towards environmental protection. It often comes under fire from logging, mining, pesticide, oil, coal and other industries. Suckling founded the Center for Biological Diversity while working on his doctoral dissertation in 1989. He served as executive director from 1989 to 2004, policy director from 2005 to 2007, and became executive director again in 2008.

== Life ==
Suckling's parents and siblings immigrated to the United States from Ireland and England in the 1960s. He is the only member of his immediate family born in the United States. As a child, he lived with his family in Ireland, England, Peru, Nevada, Maine and Massachusetts. Following the divorce of his parents, he settled in Cape Cod, graduating from Sandwich High School in 1982. He entered Salve Regina University, in Rhode Island, in 1982, then transferred the following year to double major in computer science at Worcester Polytechnic Institute and philosophy at the College of the Holy Cross. He was culturally and politically active in college, editing literary and science magazines, organizing poetry readings, founding a chapter of Student Pugwash USA, working for the Massachusetts Public Interest Research Group and participating in political rallies and teach-ins opposing U.S. intervention in Nicaragua and advocating global nuclear disarmament.

He received a BA in Philosophy from College of the Holy Cross in 1987 and went on to study natural language processing as a fellow at Stanford University's Center for the Study of Language and Information and math at Columbia University. He backpacked in national parks and wilderness areas throughout Canada, the United States and Mexico for two years, funding his travels by working as a cook in Missoula, Montana. It was during these years that he first became an environmental activist, working with Earth First! groups in Montana, New Mexico and Arizona.

In 1989 Suckling entered a Ph.D. program in philosophy at Stony Brook University. His area of concentration was phenomenology, hermeneutics, deconstruction, anthropology and religion. He taught Introduction to World Religions and Introduction to Eastern Religions to undergraduates in the Religious Studies Department. In 1990, he began work on a dissertation on the relationship between the extinction of species, languages and cultures.

During the summers, Suckling worked as a Mexican spotted owl and northern goshawk surveyor on National Forests and Native American reservation lands in New Mexico and Arizona. He started the Center for Biological Diversity in Reserve, NM, with Earth First!, owl surveying and native lands protection friends in 1989. He moved west permanently in 1992 (to Reserve) to work full time on endangered species and public land protection. He left the Stony Brook University doctoral program in 1999, receiving an MA in philosophy.

Suckling has published articles assessing trends in conservation of imperiled species, the effectiveness of the Endangered Species Act. He has examined the implications of the global homogenizing of biodiversity, language and culture, and the relationship between environmentalism, the arts, and the rights of indigenous peoples and poor communities.
