= Center for Biological Diversity =

US nonprofit environmental organization

- Formation: 1989; 37 years ago
- Type: NGO
- Tax ID no.: 27-3943866
- Legal status: 501(c)(3)
- Purpose: Protection of endangered species
- Headquarters: Tucson, Arizona
- Board Chair: Marcey Olajos
- Executive Director: Kierán Suckling
- Board of directors: Marcey Olajos; Robin Silver; Sarain Fox; Matt Frankel; Peter Galvin; Regina Romero; Todd Schulke; Mati Waiya; Terry Tempest Williams
- Website: biologicaldiversity.org

The Center for Biological Diversity is a nonprofit membership organization known for its work protecting endangered species through legal action, scientific petitions, creative media and grassroots activism. It was founded in 1989 by Kieran Suckling, Peter Galvin, Todd Schulke and Robin Silver. The center is based in Tucson, Arizona, with its headquarters in the historic Owls club building, and has offices and staff in New Mexico, Nevada, California, Oregon, Illinois, Minnesota, Alaska, Vermont, Florida and Washington, D.C.

== Background ==
Given a small grant by the Fund For Wild Nature, the organization started in 1989 as a small group by the name of Greater Gila Biodiversity Project, with the objective to protect endangered species and critical habitat in the Southwestern United States. The organization grew and became the Center for Biological Diversity.

Kieran Suckling, Peter Galvin, and Todd Schulke founded the organization in response to what they perceived as a failure on the part of the United States Forest Service to protect imperiled species from logging, grazing, and mining. As surveyors in New Mexico, the three men discovered "a rare Mexican spotted owl nest in an old-growth tree", but their discovery was ignored and the Forest Service continued with plans to lease the land to timber companies; Suckling, Galvin, and Schulke believed that it was within the Forest Service's mission to save sensitive species like the Mexican spotted owl from harm, and that the government had not performed its duty in deference to corporate interests. Suckling, Galvin and Schulke went to the media to register their outrage with success: the old-growth tree was protected from harm, and this success led to the founding of the Center for Biological Diversity.

Suckling, Galvin and Schulke assert that in 1990 they discovered the Forest Service was allowing commercial logging within the protected habitat of the owl nests. Speaking to the New York Times in 2010 a spokeswoman for the Forest Service refuted this claim, saying logging "did not occur in these areas" and that owl nests were then given a 100-acre protected area she characterized as "no touch" zones. She implied the CBD co-founders may have been mistaken regarding tree-cutting then occurring in nearby non-protected areas: "other projects did occur and could have included thinning projects to reduce wildland fires, tree plantings or other wildlife projects." The Forest Service spokeswoman was wrong. Silver had already filed a Petition to List the Mexican Spotted Owl on December 21, 1989, based in part on the fact that at the time 55% of the owls were located in areas the Forest Service had scheduled for cutting. The U.S. Fish and Wildlife concurred that the Forest Service was endangering the owl, listing the owl on March 16, 1993, acknowledging that "[t]here were 316 MTs [management territories] (61 percent) on lands available for timber harvest..."

By 2008 the Center's mission has encompassed global threats to biological diversity and climate change. In 2011 CBD reached a legal settlement with the U.S. Fish and Wildlife Service compelling the agency to make progress on protecting 757 imperiled but previously neglected animals and plants. The Center employs a group of paid and pro bono attorneys to use litigation to effect change, and claims a 93 percent success rate for their lawsuits. The 2010 New York Times profile stated the U.S. Fish and Wildlife Service (FWS) was the "target of most of [CBD's] legal work" and that FWS "says the relentless petitions and lawsuits over endangered species have diverted too many agency resources to the courtroom." The Times quoted the chief of the FWS office of litigation, who observed that the heavy load of Endangered Species Act legal filings from CBD and others had "crippled our ability to put species on the endangered species list."

Total revenue for 2017 exceeded $20.1 million, and as of March 2019 it had at least 160 employees, including more than 40 attorneys.

== Press ==
In a 1989 article in a local New Mexico paper, the founders claimed that the "Forest Service ... was more invested in its relationship with big timber than in its commitment to the public to protect forest wildlife." As a result of the article being published, the lives of an old-growth tree and the sensitive species which had made it their home were able to continue. One critic reportedly began referring to the Forest Service as the "Forest Murder Service".

In 1994, Kieran Suckling, then the director of the organization that would later become CBD, shoplifted hiking boots and bedroom slippers from a Wal-Mart. He pleaded no contest to the charges and was fined $67. Explaining the incident two years later, Suckling said "It was a bad combination of poverty and stupidity—mostly the latter." The board of directors suspended him from the director's job for three months and prohibited him from speaking to media for six months. Local critics reportedly began referring to him as the "Shoeman".

In 2005, an Arizona jury assessed a $600,000 libel judgment against CBD in a case filed by rancher and investment banker Jim Chilton. In July 2002, CBD had tried to get Chilton's public-land grazing permit rescinded and had posted photos and allegations on its website asserting Chilton was allowing destructive overgrazing and damage to animal habitat on his 21,500-acre allotment in a national forest. Chilton's lawyers provided wider angle photos of the same scenery, revealing healthy trees and greenspaces located in the same vistas. What had allegedly been presented by CBD as barren images caused by overgrazing were shown to be campsite areas used by hunters, and a parking lot used for an annual festival. The jury was persuaded the CBD photos had been misleading. Only $100,000 of the judgment was for actual harm inflicted on Chilton and his cattle company. The jury tacked on $500,000 in punitive damages, which a newspaper account said was the jury's intent to "punish [CBD] and deter others from similar libel." CBD, asserting the representations were protected under the First Amendment, unsuccessfully tried to have the decision appealed and lost, forcing CBD and its insurance company to pay the judgment.

On 13 June 2007, the Center spoke out against a George W. Bush administration proposal to reduce the protected area for the spotted owl in the United States Pacific Northwest. According to Noah Greenwald, the group's representative in the Northwest, the proposed habitat cut is "typical of an administration that is looking to reduce protections for endangered species at every turn." Greenwald said that the rollback is part of a series of "sweetheart deals," in which the administration settles an environmental lawsuit out of court and, "at the industry's wishes, reduces the critical habitat." According to the center, the move conforms to a broad trend that includes at least 25 earlier Bush administration decisions on habitat protections for endangered species. In those cases, the protected areas were reduced an average of 36 percent.

On 16 December 2008, the center announced intent to sue the United States government for introducing "regulations ... that would eviscerate our nation's most successful wildlife law by exempting thousands of federal activities, including those that generate greenhouse gases, from review under the Endangered Species Act." The lawsuit, which is critical of U.S. Interior Department Secretary Dirk Kempthorne and President George W. Bush, was filed in the Northern District of California by the center, Greenpeace and Defenders of Wildlife. According to the center, "The lawsuit argues that the regulations violate the Endangered Species Act and did not go through the required public review process. The regulations, first proposed on August 11, were rushed by the Bush administration through an abbreviated process in which more than 300,000 comments from the public were reviewed in 2–3 weeks, and environmental impacts were analyzed in a short and cursory environmental assessment, rather than a fuller environmental impact statement."

In 2015, the Center partnered with Conservation CATalyst to release their video of El Jefe, among the last jaguars residing in the United States. This video was seen by over 100 million people and brought attention to their conservation needs.

In 2019, the Center sued the U.S. Department of Agriculture's Wildlife Services program over its killing of thousands of native animals a year in Washington state. Later, in 2020, the case resulted in a determination that Washington State had exceeded its authority and that bear hunting must be curtailed.

In 2025, the Center sued the federal government, challenging the legality of the image that was selected for the 2026 America the Beautiful Pass.

== See also ==
- Environmental journalism
- Index of environmental articles
- Wildlife conservation
- Wildlife management
