= Yakima Fold Belt =

Topographical feature in Washington State

Yakima Fold Belt Yakima fold-and-thrust belt
- Fold and thrust belt
- Coordinates: 46°24′N 120°30′W
- Location: South-western part of Columbia Basin (Yakima, Kittitas, Klickitat, Benton, and Grant counties)

The Yakima Fold Belt of south-central Washington, also called the Yakima fold-and-thrust belt, is an area of topographical folds (or wrinkles) raised by tectonic compression. It is a 14,000 km^{2} (5,400 sq mi) structural-tectonic sub province of the western Columbia Plateau Province resulting from complex and poorly understood regional tectonics. The folds are associated with geological faults whose seismic risk is of particular concern to the nuclear facilities at the Hanford Nuclear Reservation (immediately northwest of the Tri-Cities) and major dams on the Columbia and Snake Rivers.

== Location and extent ==
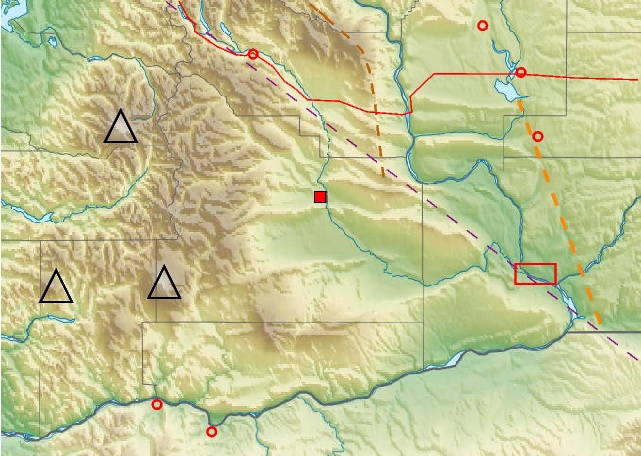
Shaded-relief map showing ridges of the Yakima Fold Belt of south-central Washington, mostly between Interstate 90 (red line) and the Columbia River (bottom). Red square in center is the city of Yakima, red rectangle at lower right is the Tri-Cities, red circles are various cities, triangles are the Mount Rainier, Mount St. Helens, and Mount Adams volcanoes of the Southern Washington Cascades. Purple dashed line marks the approximate location of the Olympic–Wallowa Lineament (OWL), crossing the Columbia River at the Wallula Gap (lower-right). Orange dashed line is approximate location of edge of the North American craton. The smoothness of the central and eastern areas is due to infilling by volcanic flows of the Columbia River Basalts.

The topographical distinctness of the Yakima Folds (see the shaded-relief image) is due to their formation in a layer of lava flows and sedimentary deposits that have filled-in and generally smoothed the topographic surface of a large area of the Columbia Basin. The extent of these lava flows was limited to the west and north by the rising Cascade Mountains and the Wenatchee Mountains. The lava flows extend east well beyond this image, but the Yakima Folds do not. The northernmost fold seen here (Frenchman Hills) ends at the Potholes Reservoir, another (Saddle Mountains) terminates just south of there, near the town of Othello (red circle). South of the Tri-Cities the rampart of the Horse Heaven Hills extends for a short distance past the Columbia River. The ends of these ridges mark the edge of a block of continental crust (part of the North American craton, indicated by the dashed orange line) that has resisted the tectonic compression that formed the ridges.

The southernmost ridge of the Yakima Fold Belt is the Columbia Hills on the north side of the Columbia River. The pattern of folding continues with the Dalles-Umatilla Syncline just south of the Columbia River, and further into Oregon with the Blue Mountains anticline, which approximately parallels the Klamath-Blue Mountain Lineament that marks the southeastern edge of Siletzia (see geological map, below).

The Yakima Fold Belt is also located on, and the orientation and spacing of some of the Folds influenced by, the Olympic–Wallowa Lineament (OWL), a broad zone of linear topographical features (dashed yellow line) extending from the Olympic Peninsula in northwestern Washington to the Wallowa Mountains in northeastern Oregon.

== Geology ==
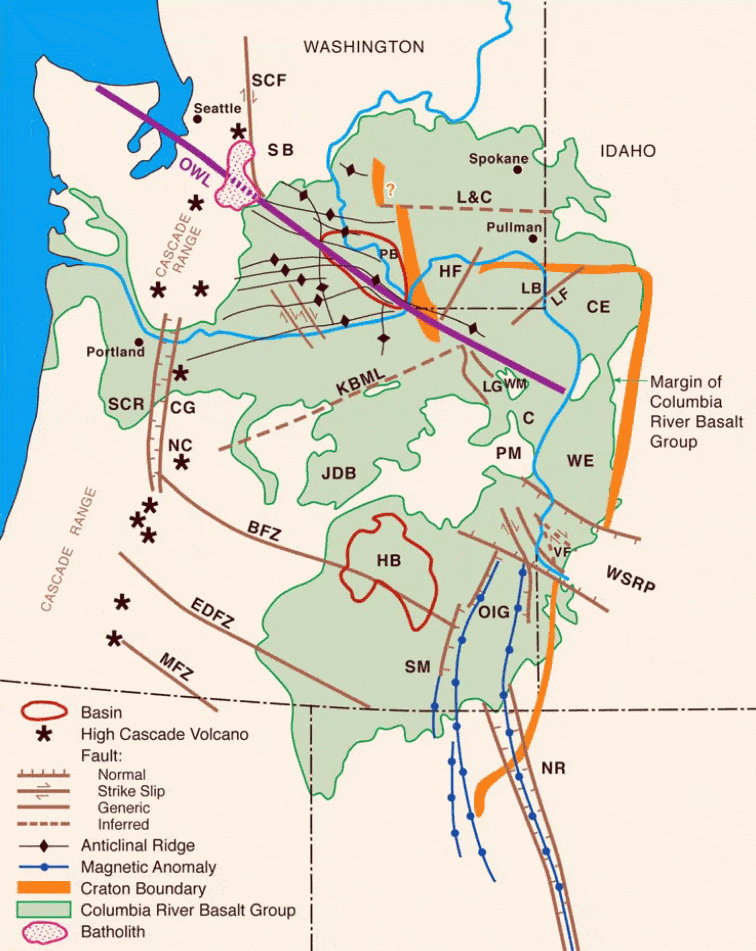
Yakima Fold Belt (thin purple lines with black diamonds) in context of major regional geological structures. Pale green is extent of the Columbia River Basalts. Thickest purple line is the OWL, thickest orange line corresponds to the craton edge in the shaded-relief map above. The Klamath-Blue Mountain Lineament (KBML, approximate location, extends to coast) is the southern edge of the marine basalts of Siletzia. BFZ, EDFZ, and MFZ are the Brothers, Eugene-Denio, and McLaughlin fault zones.

It is the central portion of the Olympic–Wallowa Lineament, referred to as the Cle Elum-Wallula deformed zone (CLEW), consisting of a series of generally east-trending narrow asymmetrical anticlinal ridges and broad synclinal valleys formed by folding of Miocene Columbia River basalt flows and sediments. In most parts of the belt the folds have a north vergence (Columbia Hills' south vergence is an exception) with the steep limb typically faulted by imbricate thrust faults. Fold lengths range from 1 km to 100 km with wavelengths from several kilometers to 20 km.

A graben underlies nearly the entire Yakima Fold Belt and has been subsiding since Eocene time, and continues to sink at a slow rate.

A 2011 report found aeromagnetic, gravity, and paleoseismic evidence that the Yakima Fold Belt is linked to active Puget Sound faults.

== Geodesy ==
Geodetic studies of the Oregon Rotation show that Oregon is rotating about a point somewhat south of Lewiston, Idaho compressing the Yakima fold an average of 3 millimeters per year, and the Washington Pacific coast about 7 millimeters per year.

Studies of the motion of the Yakima Fold Belt have been undertaken to evaluate seismic hazards at the Hanford Site.

== See also ==
- Columbia Plateau (ecoregion)#Yakima Folds bioregion

== Notes and sources ==
=== Sources ===
- Barnett, Elizabeth A.; Sherrod, Brian L.; Norris, Robert; Gibbons, Douglas (2013), "Paleoseismology of a newly discovered scarp in the Yakima fold-and-thrust belt, Kittitas County, Washington", United States Geological Survey, Scientific Investigations Map 3212
- Barrash, W.; Bond, J.; Venkatakrishnan, R. (November 1983), "Structural evolution of the Columbia Plateau in Washington and Oregon", American Journal of Science, 283 (9): 897–935, doi:10.2475/ajs.283.9.897
- Blakely, Richard J.; Sherrod, Brian L.; Weaver, Craig S.; Wells, Ray E.; Rohay, Alan C.; Barnett, Elizabeth A.; Knepprath, Nichole E. (July 28, 2011), "Connecting the Yakima fold and thrust belt to active faults in the Puget Lowland, Washington", Journal of Geophysical Research: Solid Earth, 116 (B7), Bibcode:2011JGRB..116.7105B, doi:10.1029/2010JB008091
- Last, George V.; Winsor, Kelsey; Unwin, Stephen D. (August 1, 2012), A Summary of Information on the Behavior of the Yakima Fold Belt as a Structural Entity — Topical Report, United States Department of Energy Pacific Northwest National Laboratory, PNNL-17471 830403000, doi:10.2172/1053763, OSTI 1053763
- Lidke, D.J., compiler (2002), "Fault number 562b, Saddle Mountains structures, folds and other faults of the Saddle Mountains", Quaternary fault and fold database of the United States: U.S. Geological Survey website, United States Geological Survey
- Pogue, Kevin R. (2009), "Folds, floods and fine wine: Geologic influences on the terroir of the Columbia Basin", in O'Connor, Jim E.; Dorsey, Rebecca J.; Madin, Ian (eds.), Volcanoes to Vineyards: Geologic Field Trips Through the Dynamic Landscape of the Pacific Northwest (Volume 15 of Geological Society of America Field Guide), Geological Society of America, ISBN 9780813700151
- Pratt, Thomas L. (November 2012), "Large-scale splay faults on a strike-slip fault system: The Yakima Folds, Washington State", Geochemistry, Geophysics, Geosystems, 13 (11), doi:10.1029/2012GC004405
- Reidel, Stephen P.; Fecht, Karl R.; Hagood, Michael C.; Tolan, Terry L. (1989), "The Geologic Evolution of the Central Columbia Plateau", in Reidel, S. P.; Hooper, P. R. (eds.), Volcanism and Tectonism in the Columbia River Flood-Basalt Province, vol. Special Paper 239, Geological Society of America, pp. 247–264, doi:10.1130/SPE239-p247, ISBN 9780813722399
- Reidel, Stephen P.; Martin, Barton S.; Petcovic, Heather L. (2003), "The Columbia River flood basalts and the Yakima fold belt", in Swanson, Terry W. (ed.), Western Cordillera and Adjacent Areas: Volume 4 of Geological Society of America Field Guide, Geological Society of America, p. 91, ISBN 9780813700045
- Reidel, Stephen P. (2004), Northwest Geological Society Field Trips in Pacific Northwest Geology: The Geologic Development of the Pasco Basin, South-Central Washington (PDF), Northwest Geological Society, archived from the original (PDF) on 2014-10-06
- Watters, Thomas R. (1989), "Periodically spaced anticlines of the Columbia Plateau", in Reidel, S. P.; Hooper, P. R. (eds.), Volcanism and Tectonism in the Columbia River Flood-Basalt Province, vol. Special Paper 239, Geological Society of America, pp. 283–292, doi:10.1130/SPE239-p283
- Wells, Ray E.; Blakely, Richard J.; Sherrod, Brian L.; Weaver, Craig S. (2009), "The Yakima Fold and Thrust Belt - a paradigm for active shortening in the Columbia embayment from Pasco to the Pacific Ocean", American Geophysical Union, Fall Meeting, vol. 2009, American Geophysical Union, Bibcode:2009AGUFM.S41F..01W, abstract S41F-01
