= Owl River =

Owl River may refer to:

- Owl River (Manitoba), Canada
- Owl River, Alberta, Canada

== See also ==
- Owl Creek (disambiguation)
