= Owl (comics) =

Owl, in comics, may refer to:

- Owl (Marvel Comics), a Marvel Comics supervillain
- Owl (Dell Comics), a Dell Comics superhero
- Owlman (character), character in DC Comics

== See also ==
- Owl (disambiguation)
