= Owl Club (disambiguation) =

Owl Club is a social club in Cape Town, South Africa, for people interested in arts and sciences.

Owl Club may also refer to:

- Owl Club (Harvard), an all-male club at Harvard University
- Owls club (Tucson, Arizona), an historic building in Tucson, Arizona
- The Owl club, a popular website used to watch the Disney show, The Owl House
