= Owl Creek (Wisconsin) =

Coordinates: 44°23′05″N 90°06′51″W

Location
- Country: United States
- States: Wisconsin

Owl Creek is a stream in Wood County in the U.S. state of Wisconsin. It is a tributary of the Yellow River within Lake Dexter.

Owl Creek was named for the owls in the area.
