= Owl Creek (North Fork Charrette Creek tributary) =

Stream in the US state of Missouri

Coordinates: 38.7464376°N 91.1009801°W

Owl Creek is a stream in Warren County in the U.S. state of Missouri. It is a tributary of North Fork Charrette Creek.

Owl Creek most likely was named after the animal.

== See also ==
- List of rivers of Missouri
