= Owl Creek (Sni-A-Bar Creek tributary) =

Stream in the U.S. state of Missouri

Coordinates: 39.043897°N 94.016612°W

Owl Creek is a stream in Lafayette County in the U.S. state of Missouri. It is a tributary of Sni-A-Bar Creek.

Owl Creek was named for the owls near its course.

== See also ==
- List of rivers of Missouri
