= Owls club (Tucson, Arizona) =

Historic building in Tucson, Arizona

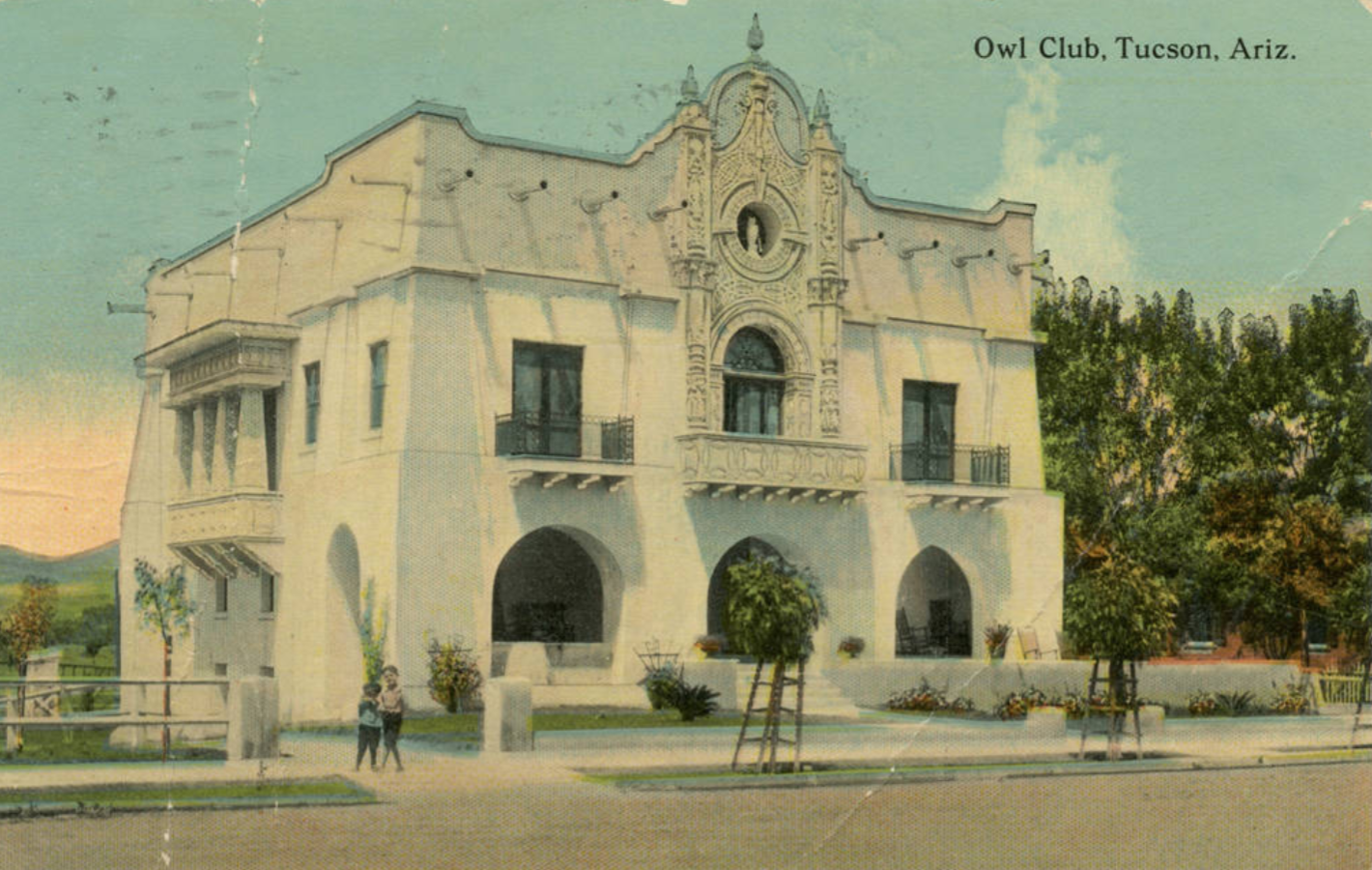
- 1912 postcard depicting the Owls Club.

General information
- Type: Fraternal lodge
- Address: 378 North Main Avenue
- Town or city: Tucson, Arizona
- Country: United States
- Coordinates: 32°13′34″N 110°58′36″W
- Current tenants: Center for Biological Diversity
- Groundbreaking: April 1902
- Completed: by July 1902

Design and construction
- Architect(s): Henry C. Trost
- Architecture firm: Trost & Rust

The Owls club is an historic building in the El Presidio neighborhood of Tucson, Arizona, originally built in 1902 as the second building for the Owls, a bachelor's club in that city. As of 2020, it was occupied by the Center for Biological Diversity, which acquired the property in 2014, after it had passed through numerous other owners.

== Original building ==
The original building of the Owls had been built in 1894 by "a group of prosperous bachelors who built and lived in an impressive house", and was occupied by those men until it was sold in 1900. The group called themselves the Owls "because the parties would last late into the night". The original building passed through various hands, ending up with the American Legion before being torn down in 1967 to accommodate a widening of the main roads it abutted.

== Construction of the second building ==
It was reported in January 1902 that the Owls would build a new clubhouse. The building was designed by architect Henry C. Trost, of the firm of Trost & Rust, and was constructed at 378 North Main Avenue. Architectural details were reported as construction was being planned:

The new Clubhouse will be the same style of architecture is the old one but will be two storeys and height with basement and the floor plans will be quite different from the old arrangement. On the first floor there will be a large reception hall, a very large parlor room and living room and a large dining room. To the right of the reception hall it will be a library. The second floor will be devoted to four bedrooms each with a private bath. The new structure will be built of brick, stone and plaster and will be even handsomer than the old Owls Club. There will be no open court as in the present building but there will be a large veranda in front. As soon as the sketches are finished, Messrs. Freeman, Tenney and Goldsmith, who compose the owls Club will inspect them and make any suggestions that they see fit.

It was suggested that the new building would be "a model for convenience and comfort and... one of the finest private clubhouses in the West". Ground was broken for the building in April 1902, and the first major event reported to be held at the club was a luncheon for the newly appointed territorial governor Alexander Oswald Brodie, on July 22, 1902. The club soon developed a reputation for elegance that rivaled that of some of the nation's most exclusive clubs.

== Occupation and changes of ownership ==
At the time of its opening, three men occupied the house and co-owned it as shareholders, Leo Goldschmidt, Herbert Tenney, and M.P. Freeman. The organization dissolved in 1912 as bachelor members Tenney and Freeman moved on to have families or pursue other interests. Goldschmidt bought out their shares in 1912, and lived there himself for a time, eventually passing the house along to nieces and nephews. It was still in his possession when he died in 1944. The Owls club building was later sold several times, and after falling into disrepair, the building was restored in 1986. and was sold to Raul Pina and Michael Carlier in May 2005. It was put up for sale in 2009 at an asking price of $2,000,000, placed into foreclosure in January 2011, and ultimately purchased by the Center for Biological Diversity in April 2014.
