= Olympic–Wallowa lineament =

Geologic feature in Washington and Oregon, United States

The Olympic–Wallowa lineament (OWL) is a series of geologic structures oriented from northwest to southeast for 650 km (400 mi) across Washington and northeast Oregon in the United States, passing through the Seattle area and including notable features east of the Cascade Range such as the Yakima Fold Belt and Wallowa Mountains. It was first reported by cartographer Erwin Raisz in 1945 on a relief map of the continental United States. The origin of this feature in its entirety is not well understood. The Olympic–Wallowa lineament likely predates the Columbia River Basalt Group.

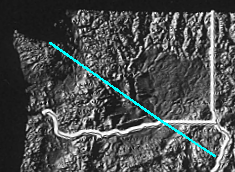
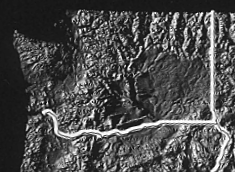

== Location ==
Raisz located the OWL from Cape Flattery (the northwest corner of the Olympic Peninsula) and along the north shore of Lake Crescent, thence to the Little River (south of Port Angeles), Liberty Bay (Poulsbo), Elliott Bay (setting the orientation of the streets in downtown Seattle), the north shore of Mercer Island, the Cedar River (Chester Morse Reservoir), Stampede Pass (at the crest of the Cascade Range), the south side of the Kittitas Valley (I-90), Manastash Ridge, the Wallula Gap (on the Columbia River in southeastern Washington, where it approaches the Oregon state line), and then the South Fork of the Walla Walla River as it flows north into Washington from the northeastern corner of Oregon. After crossing the Blue Mountains, Raisz associated the OWL with a dramatic scarp on the north side of the Wallowa Mountains. Raisz observed that the OWL tends to have basins on the north side (Seattle Basin, Kittitas Valley, Pasco Basin, Walla Walla Basin) and mountains on the southern side (the Olympics, Manastash and Umtanum ridges, Rattlesnake Mountain, the Horseheaven Hills, the Wallowa Mountains), and noted parallel alignments at various points, generally about four miles north or south of the main line. The alignment of these particular features is somewhat irregular; modern maps with much more detail show a broad zone of more regular alignments. Subsequent geological investigations have suggested various refinements and adjustments.

== Structural relationships with other features ==
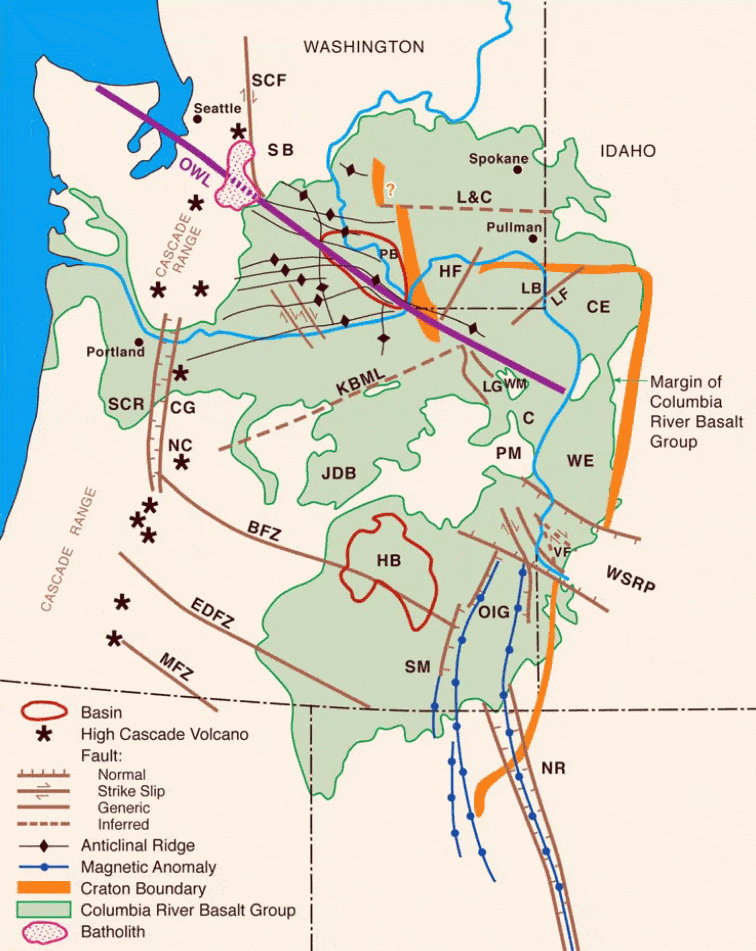
Major geological structures in Washington and Oregon: SCF – Straight Creek fault; SB – Snoqualmie batholith (dotted area to the left); OWL – Olympic–Wallowa lineament; L&C – Lewis and Clark line (gravity anomaly); HF – Hite fault; KBML – Klamath-Blue Mountains lineament (slightly misplaced); NC – Newberry caldera; BFZ – Brothers Fault zone; EDFZ –Eugene-Denio fault zone; MFZ – McLoughlin fault zone; WSRP – western Snake River Plain; NR – Nevada Rift zone; OIG – Oregon-Idaho graben; CE – Clearwater Embayment; (From Martin, Petcovic & Reidel 2005, Fig. 1, courtesy of PNNL)

A problem in evaluating any hypothesis regarding the OWL is a dearth of evidence. Raisz suggested that the OWL might be a "transcurrent fault" (long strike-slip faults at what are now known to be plate boundaries), but lacked both data and competence to assess it. One of the first speculations that the OWL might be a major geological structure (Wise 1963) – written when the theory of plate tectonics was still new and not entirely accepted (Note: As late as 1976, Thomas referred to the "presently popular plate tectonics theory".) – was called by the author "an outrageous hypothesis". Modern investigation is still largely balked by the immense span of geography involved and lack of continuous structures, the lack of clearly cross-cutting features, and a confusing expression in both rock millions of years old and glacial sediments only 16,000 years old.

Geological investigation of a feature begins with determining its structure, composition, age, and relationship with other features. The OWL does not cooperate. It is expressed as an orientation in many elements of diverse structure and compositions, and even as a boundary between areas of differing structure and composition; there is yet no understanding of what kind of feature or process – the "ur-OWL" – could control this. Nor are there particular "OWL" rocks which can be examined and radiometrically dated. We are left with determining its age by looking at its relationship with other features, such as which features overlap or cross-cut other (presumably older) features. In the following sections we will look at several features which might be expected to have some kind of structural relationship with the OWL, and consider what they might tell us about the OWL.

=== Cascade Range ===
The most notable geological feature crossing the OWL is the Cascade Range, raised up in the Pliocene (two to five million years ago) as a result of the Cascadia subduction zone. These mountains are distinctly different on either side of the OWL, the material of the South Cascades being Cenozoic (<66 Ma) volcanic and sedimentary rock, and the North Cascades being much older Paleozoic (hundreds of millions of years) metamorphic and plutonic rocks. It is unknown whether this difference is in any way linked with the OWL, or is simply a coincidental regional difference.

Raisz judged the Cascades on the north side of the OWL to be offset about six miles to the west, and similarly for the Blue Mountains, but this is questionable, and similar offsets are not apparent in the older – up to 17 Ma (millions of years) old – Columbia River basalt flows. In general, there are no clear indications of structures offset by the OWL, but neither are there any distinct features crossing the OWL (and older than 17 Ma) that positively demonstrate a lack of offsetting.

=== Straight Creek Fault ===
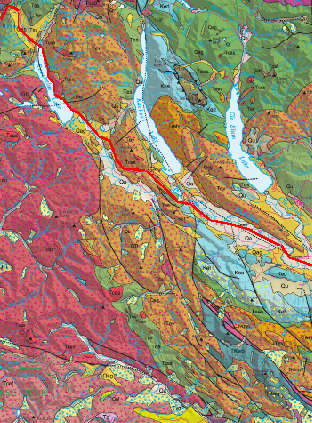
Geological topography where the SCF meets the OWL, showing general curvature to the southeast around Lakes Keechelus, Kachess, and Cle Elum. Red line is Interstate 90, Snoqualmie Pass is at upper left corner, Easton is near center. The White River—Naches Fault Zone, at the bottom of the red area, appears to be the southern edge of the OWL.

The Straight Creek Fault (SCF) – just east of Snoqualmie Pass and running nearly due north into Canada – is a major fault notable for considerable identified dextral strike-slip offset (opposite side moving laterally to the right) of at least 90 km (56 mi). (Note: Estimates of offset vary; this is the minimum.) Its intersection with the OWL (near Kachess Lake) is the geological equivalent of an atom smasher, and the results should be informative. For example, that the OWL is not offset suggests that it must be younger than the last strike-slip motion on the SCF, (Note: Alternately, could the OWL be a reflection of some kind of structure – perhaps in the lithosphere – that is not affected by the SCF?) anywhere from around 44 to about 41 million years ago (i.e., during the middle-Eocene epoch). And if the OWL is a strike-slip fault or megashear, as many have speculated, then it should offset the SCF, and whether the OWL offsets the SCF, or not, becomes an important test of just what the OWL is.

So does the OWL offset the SCF, or not? It is hard to say, as no trace whatsoever has been found of the SCF anywhere south of the OWL. While some geologists have speculated that it does continue directly south, albeit hidden under younger deposits, not a trace has been found.

If the SCF fault does not continue directly southward – and the utter lack of evidence that it does makes a case for evidence of lack – then where else might it be? Heller, Tabor & Suczek (1987) suggest some possibilities: it may curve to the east, it may curve to the west, or it may just end.

Tabor mapped the SCF turning and merging with the Taneum fault (coincident with the OWL) south of Kachess Lake. This conforms with the general pattern seen in Lakes Keechelus, Kachess, and Cle Elum, and associated geological units and faults (see image, right): each is aligned north—south at the north end, but turns to the southeast where it approaches the OWL. This is suggestive of the OWL being a left lateral (sinistral) strike-slip fault that has distorted and offset the SCF. But that is inconsistent with the SCF itself and most other strike-slip faults associated with the OWL being right lateral (dextral), and incompatible with the geology to the southeast. Particularly, studies of the region to the southeast (in connection with Department of Energy activities at the Hanford Reservation) show no indication of any fault or other structure comparable to the SCF.

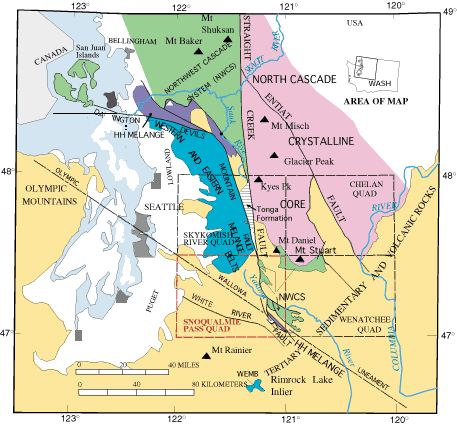
Figure 1 from USGS Map I-2538 (Tabor et al. 2000).

On the other hand, Cheney (1999) maps the SCF as proceeding southerly (without addressing the situation south of the OWL). (He has subsequently speculated that the missing part of the SCF may have been dextrally offset to become a southerly trending fault in the Puget Lowland. But same problem: later deposits cover any traces.) The seeming southeasterly curvature is possibly explained as a geometrical effect of foreshortening: it occurs in a belt of intense folding (much resembling a rug which has slid against a wall) which, if unfolded, could restore some of the "curves" to a linear position along the southerly extension of the SCF.

There seem to be no indications that the SCF turns to the west. Although such indications would mostly be buried, the general sense of the topography suggests no such turn. Displacement, to either the west or the east, seems unlikely in that certain effects that would be expected are not found. (Note: E.g., displacement of the Olympic Mountains is not observed, so the block moving away from the Olympics should leave a gap, and likely grabens. There is a basin – the Seattle Basin – just immediately north of the Seattle Fault, but it appears no one has attributed it to movement on the OWL.)

Could the SCF just end? This is difficult to comprehend. If there is displacement along this fault, where did it come from? To quote Wyld et al. (albeit in the context of a different fault): "it cannot just end". Although the SCF has had substantial strike-slip displacement, Vance & Miller (1994) claim that final major movement on the SCF (about 40 Ma ago) was dominantly dip-slip (vertical displacement). So perhaps the displacement came from the depths, and, as it was extruded, was eroded and redistributed as sediments. But this has not been established.

Another possibility is that the missing southern segment of the SCF is on a crustal block that rotated away from the OWL. There is evidence that around 45 million years ago much of Oregon and southwestern Washington rotated some 60° or more about a pivot somewhere in the Olympic Peninsula (see Oregon rotation, below). This would have left a large gap south of the OWL, which could explain why Cenozoic rocks are not found immediately south of the OWL. This suggests that a continuation of the SCF, if any, and the missing Cenozoic, might be somewhere southwest of Mount St. Helens, but this has not been observed.

=== Darrington–Devils Mountain Fault Zone ===
The interaction of the Straight Creek Fault with the OWL has yielded practically no intelligible information, and remains as enigmatic as the OWL itself. More informative is the closely related Darrington—Devils Mountain Fault Zone (DDMFZ). It runs east from a complex of faults on the southern end of Vancouver Island to the town of Darrington, where it turns south to converge with the SCF (see map, above).

North of the DDMFZ (and west of the SCF) is the Chuckanut Formation (part of the "Northwest Cascade System" of rocks shown in green on the map), an Eocene sedimentary formation which formed adjacent to the Swauk, Roslyn and other formations (also in green) south of Mount Stuart; their wide separation is attributed to right-lateral strike-slip movement along the SCF. That the northern part of the DDMFZ shows left-lateral strike-slip movement is not the inconsistency it may initially seem – think of the motion on either side of an arrowhead.

It appears that what is now the DDMFZ was originally aligned on the OWL. Then about 50 Ma ago North America crashed into what is now the Olympic Peninsula along an axis nearly perpendicular to the OWL, pushing the rock of the Mesozoic (pre-Cenozoic) Western and Eastern Melange Belts (WEMB, blue on the map) across the OWL, bowing the DDMFZ, and initiating the SCF and thereby splitting the Chuckanut Formation. On the north side of the DDMFZ, and wrapping around a bit to the east side, is a suite of distinctive rocks – the Helena–Haystack mélange ("HH Melange" on the map) – which was collapsed into vertical folds. Similarly distinctive rock is found in Manastash Ridge (shown on the map, but almost too small to see) still lying on the OWL, just east of the SCF.

This can explain an early puzzle as to why the Mesozoic rocks just south of the DDMFZ – the Western and Eastern Melange Belts – have no counterpart on the east side of the OWL and offset to the south: they were not faulted by the SCF, but were pushed against it from the southwest.

Then it gets curiouser. Rock very similar to the WEMB (including a type called blueschist) is also found in the San Juan Islands, and along the West Coast fault on the west side of Vancouver Island. This suggests that the OWL was once a strike-slip fault, possibly a continental margin, along which terranes moved from the southeast. But similar rock also occurs in the Rimrock Lake Inlier, about 75 km south of the OWL and just west of the projected trace of the SCF, and also in the Klamath Mountains of southwestern Oregon. To account for the wide dispersal of this rock is difficult; many geologists see no alternative to transport along an extended SCF. But that upsets some of the "solutions" described above, and there is yet no consensus on this.

=== CLEW and Columbia Plateau ===
Further east is the "CLEW", the segment of the OWL from approximately the town of Cle Elum (marking the western limit of the Columbia River basalts) to the Wallula Gap (a narrow gap on the Columbia River just north of the Oregon border). This segment, and the associated Yakima fold belts, do include many northeast-trending faults crossing the OWL. However, these are largely dip-slip (vertical) faults, associated with compressional folding of the overlying basalt. As there is typically 3 km of sedimentary deposits separating the basalts (also about 3 km thick) from the basement rock, these faults are somewhat isolated from the deeper structure. The geological consensus is that any strike-slip activity on the OWL predates the 17 Ma old Columbia River Basalt Group.

There is some evidence that some of the northwest-trending ridges may have some continuity with the basement structure, but the nature and details of the deeper structure is not known. A 260 km long seismic refraction profile showed a rise in the crustal basement beneath the OWL, but was unable to determine if that rise was aligned with the OWL, or just coincidentally crossed the OWL at the same location as the profile; gravity data suggested the latter. The seismic data showed a uniformity of rock type and thickness across the OWL that discounts the possibility of it being a boundary between continental and oceanic crust. The results were interpreted as suggesting continental rifting during the Eocene, perhaps a failed rift basin, (Note: But questioned by others. See Reidel et al. 1993, p. 9, and also Saltus 1993.) possibly connected with the rotation of the Klamath Mountain block away from the Idaho Batholith (see Oregon rotation, below).

There is a curious change of character of the OWL in the center of the CLEW where it crosses the roughly north-trending Hog Ranch—Naneum Anticline. West of there the OWL seems to follow a ridge in the basement structure, to the east it follows a gravity gradient, much like the Klamath–Blue Mountain Lineament (see below) does. The significance of all this is not known.

=== Hite Fault System ===
Past the Wallula Gap the OWL is identified with the Wallula Fault Zone, which heads towards the Blue Mountains. The Wallula Fault Zone is active, but whether that can be attributed to the OWL is unknown: it may be that, like the Yakima Fold Belt, it is a result of regional stresses, and is expressed only in the superficial basalt, quite independently of what ever is happening in the basement rock.

At the western edge of the Blue Mountains the Wallula Fault zone intersects the northeast-striking Hite Fault System (HFS). This system is complex and has been variously interpreted. Although seismically active it appears to be offset by, and thus should be older than, the Wallula fault. On the other hand, a later study found "no obvious displacement" of either the OWL or HFS–related faults. Reidel et al. suggested that the HFS reflects the eastern margin of a piece of old continental craton (centered around the "HF" – Hite Fault – on the map) that has slipped south; Kuehn attributed 80 to 100 kilometers of left-lateral displacement along the HFS (and significant vertical displacements).

The interaction of the Wallula and Hite Fault systems is not yet understood. Past the Hite Fault System the OWL enters a region of geological complexity and confusion, where even the trace of the OWL is less clear, even to the point where it has been suggested that both the topographic feature and the Wallula fault are terminated by the Hite fault. The original topographic lineament as described by Raisz is along the scarp on the northeast side of the Wallowa Mountains. However, there is a sense that the trend of the faulting in that area turns more to the south; it has been suggested the faulting associated with the OWL takes a large step south to the Vale Fault Zone, which connects with the Snake River Fault Zone in Idaho. Both of these lines introduce a bend into the OWL. The Imnaha Fault (striking towards Riggins, Idaho) is more nearly in line with the rest of the OWL, and in line with the previously mentioned gravitational anomalies that run into the continent. Which ever way is deemed correct, it is notable that the OWL seems to change character after it crosses the Hite Fault System. What this says about the nature of the OWL is unclear, although Kuehn concluded that, in northeastern Oregon or western Idaho, it is not a tectonically significant structure.

=== Wallowa terrane ===
As described above, the trace of the OWL becomes faint and somewhat confused between the Blue Mountains and the margin of the North American craton (the thick orange line on the map, just beyond the Oregon—Idaho border; the dashed line on the diagram below). This is the Wallowa terrane, a piece of crust that drifted in from somewhere else and got jammed between the Columbia Embayment to the west and the North American continent to the east and north. A notable feature is the anomalously elevated Wallowa Mountains, to the east is Hells Canyon (Snake River) on the Oregon—Idaho border. Northeast of the OWL (Wallowa Mountains) is the Clearwater Embayment ("CE" on the map), delineated by ancient rock of the craton. Southwest of this section of the OWL is a region of grabens (where large blocks of crust have dropped) extending about 60 miles (97 km) south to the nearly parallel Vale Fault Zone (see diagram, below).

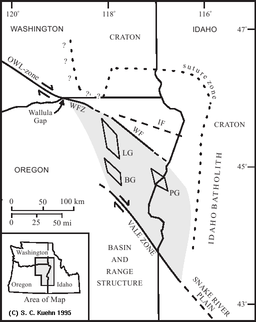
Wallula-Vale Transfer Zone and environs. WFZ – Wallula Fault Zone; IF – Imnaha Fault; WF – Wallowa Fault; LG – La Grande Graben; BG – Baker Graben PG – Pine Valley Graben. Map courtesy of S. C. Kuehn.

Grabens form where the crust is being stretched or extended. Several explanations have been offered as to why this is happening here. Kuehn (1995) theorized that right-lateral slip on the Wallula Fault is being transferred to more southerly faults such as the Vale Fault, wherefore he labelled this region the Wallula–Vale Transfer Zone. Essman (2003) suggested that crustal deformation in this region is a continuation of the Basin and Range region immediately to the south, with any connection to the OWL deemed circumstantial. Another explanation is that clock-wise rotation of part of Oregon (discussed below) about a point near the Wallula Gap has pulled the Blue Mountains away from the OWL; this might also explain why the OWL seems to be bending here.

These theories may all have some truth to them, but what they might imply regarding the genesis and structure of the OWL has not been worked out.

Hells Canyon – North America's deepest river gorge – is so deep because the terrain it cuts through is so high. This is generally attributed to thinning of the crust, which allows the hotter, and therefore lighter and more buoyant, mantle material to rise higher. This is believed by many to be involved with the Yellowstone hotspot and Columbia River Basalts; the nature of such involvement, if any, is hotly debated. While the Yellowstone hotspot and Columbia River Basalts do not seem to directly interact with the OWL, clarification of their origin and context might explain some of the OWL's context, and even constrain possible models. Likewise, clarification of the nature and history of the Wallowa terrane, and particularly of the nature and causes of the apparent bending and multiple alignments of the OWL in this region, would be a major step in understanding the OWL.

=== Columbia Embayment and KBML ===
The bedrock of Washington and Oregon, like most of the continent, is nearly all pre-Cenozoic rock, older than 66 million years. The exception is southwestern Washington and Oregon, which has virtually no pre-Cenozoic strata. This is the Columbia Embayment, a large indentation into the North American continent characterized by oceanic crust covered by thick sedimentary deposits. ("Embayment" is perhaps a misleading term, in that it suggests a bowing of a coast line, which only seems so in the context of the modern coast. In the geological past, the coast of North America was in Idaho and Nevada, as will be described later.)

The Columbia Embayment is of interest here because its northern margin is approximately delineated by the OWL. The variations are mainly in the region of the CLEW, where sediments are buried under the basalts of the Columbia Basin, and in Puget Sound, where the Cenozoic geology extends as far north as Vancouver Island. (Note: The contact between oceanic and continental crust seems to be the Southern Whidbey Island Fault, discussed below. Whether this contact extends south of the OWL is not yet known.) Whether the OWL might reflect a deeper crustal boundary has been questioned by geophysical studies which may – or may not – see the characteristics expected of such a boundary.

The southern edge of the Columbia Embayment is along a line from the Klamath Mountains on the Oregon coast to a point in the Blue Mountains just east of the Wallula Gap. Unlike the OWL, this line has little topographical expression, (Note: The lack of topographical relief may be due to in-filling by the Grande Ronde and Picture Gorge basalt flows (related to the Columbia River Basalts).) and aside from the Hite Fault System is not associated with any major fault systems. But mapping of gravitational anomalies shows a definite lineament, some 700 km (about 400 miles) long, called the Klamath-Blue Mountain Lineament (KBML). This lineament is of interest here because of the possibility it was formerly conjugate with OWL, discussed in the next section.

=== Oregon rotation ===
Rotation of the Earth's crust around the U.S. state of Oregon has been inferred from geodesy, paleomagnetism and other measurements. The Oregon Coast Range fault block rotates around a point in Washington State. The rotational geologic pole for right-lateral faults and seismicity lineations in western Washington and Oregon is 47.9°N 117.7°W Measurements of paleomagnetism (the record of the direction the rock was pointed when it cooled) from a variety of sites in the Coast Range – from the Klamath Mountains to the Olympic Peninsula – consistently measure clockwise rotations of 50 to 70 degrees. (Note: Geologists are often disturbed by the results from geophysical methods, which they attribute to various kinds of errors. Geophysicists claim their results have a consistency that precludes such errors.) (See map, below.) One interpretation of this is that western Oregon and southwestern Washington have swung as a rigid block about a pivot point at the northern end, near the Olympic Peninsula.

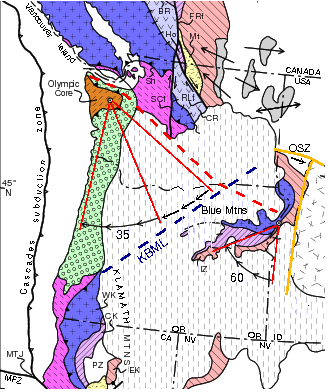
Rotation of Coast Range (light green) and Blue Mountains shown by red lines. (Authorities differ on amount and location of poles; see text.) Dashed red line is OWL; dashed blue line is KBML; intersection is approximate location of Wallula Gap. Original map courtesy of William R. Dickinson.

The interesting thing is: backing out this rotation restores the Coast Range to an earlier position nearly juxtaposed against the OWL. Hammond (1979) argues that the Coast Range (believed to be seamounts that had previously accreted to the continent) were rifted away from the continent starting about 50 Ma ago (mid-Eocene). This interpretation implies a "back arc" of magmatism, probably fed by a subduction zone, and possibly implicated with the intrusion of various plutons in the North Cascades around 50 Ma. Curiously, this is just when the Kula–Farallon spreading ridge passed under the OWL (discussed below). Magill & Cox (1981) found a spurt of rapid rotation around 45 Ma ago. This may be when this block was impinged by the Sierra Nevada block of California; Simpson & Cox (1977) note that around 40 Ma ago there was a change in the direction of the Pacific Plate (possibly due to collision with another plate). (The cause and nature of the rifting does not seem to have been worked out yet. Certain complications in the subduction of the Kula and Farallon plates may have been involved.)

During this rotation of the Coast Range the block of continental crust that is now the Blue Mountains (on the eastern side of the KBML) was also rifted away from the Idaho batholith, and also rotated about 50 degrees, but about a point near the Wallula Gap (or perhaps further east). In the resulting gap the crust was stretched and thinned; the buoyancy of the hotter mantle have contributed to the subsequent rise of the Wallowa and Seven Devils Mountains, and perhaps also with the irruption of the Columbia River basalts and other basalt flows.

While the rigid-block rotation model has much appeal, many geologists prefer another interpretation that minimizes whole–block rotation, and instead of rifting invokes "dextral shear" (resulting from the relative motion of the Pacific plate past the North American plate, or possibly from the extension of the Basin and Range province) as the primary driving force. The large values of paleomagnetic rotation are explained by a "ball bearing" model: the entire Oregon block (western Oregon including the Cascades and southwestern Washington) are deemed to be composed of many smaller blocks (on the scale of tens of kilometers), each of which rotates independently on its own axis. Evidence of such small blocks (at least in southwestern Washington) has been claimed. Later work has attempted to work out how much of the paleomagnetic rotation reflects actual block rotation; although the amount of rotation has been reduced (to perhaps only 28°), it seems it will not entirely go away. How this affects the postulated rifting does not seem to have been addressed. A more recent work based on analysis of GPS measurements concluded that "most of the Pacific Northwest can be described by a few large, rotating, elastic crustal blocks", but noted that in a zone about 50 km wide on the Oregon coast the apparent rotation rate seems to double; this suggests that multiple models may be applicable.

Modern measurements show that central Oregon is still rotating, with the calculated rotation poles bracketing the Wallula Gap, which is approximately the intersection of the OWL and KBML. It is intriguing to consider whether the KBML has participated in this rotation, but this is unclear; that it is unbent where it crosses the OWL suggests it is not. The OWL seems to be the northern edge of the rotating block, and the paucity of paleomagnetic data to the southeast of the KBML suggests it might be the southern edge. But the details of all this remain murky.

=== Puget Sound ===
The west side of central Puget Sound, Holmes Harbor, and Saratoga Passage forms a lineament (between blue bars) that is offset at Port Madison (red bar).

Another notable feature that crosses the OWL is Puget Sound, and it is curious to consider the possible implications of a Puget Sound Fault. (Such a fault was once proposed on the basis of certain marine seismic data, but the proposal was stiffly rejected, and now seems to have been abandoned.) Combined terrestrial and bathymetric topography shows a distinct lineament along the west side of Puget Sound from Vashon Island (just north of Tacoma) north to the west side of Holmes Harbor and Saratoga Passage on Whidbey Island (see image). But at Port Madison (at the red bar in the image) it is split by a distinct offset of several miles.

Curiously, the southern section lies in the approximate zone of the OWL. (Note OWL–associated lineaments running parallel to the red line.) This suggests dextral offset along a strike-slip fault. But if that is the case then there should be a major fault in the vicinity of Port Madison and crossing to Seattle (perhaps at the Ship Canal, aligned with the red line) – but for this there is even less evidence than there was for the Puget Sound fault. (Note: The southern segment of this lineament is where Brandon (1989) located the boundary of the Cascade orogen (the "Cenozoic Truncation Scar" in his Fig. 1). But this boundary is now known to be the South Whidbey Island Fault, which crosses Whidbey Island near Holmes Harbor and strikes southeast.) The significance of this lineament and its offset is entirely unknown. That it seems to be expressed in Ice Age (16 Ka) deposits implies a very recent but entirely unknown event; but perhaps these recent deposits are only draped over a much older topography. A recent offset might explain the apparent offsetting of north–south glacial drumlins bisected by the Ship Canal, but is not evident in more eastern segments.

Alternately – and this would seem very pertinent in regard of the OWL – perhaps some mechanism other than strike-slip faulting creates these lineaments.

=== Seattle Fault ===
A locally notable feature that crosses the zone of the OWL is the west–east Seattle Fault. This is not a strike-slip fault, but a thrust fault, where a relatively shallow slab of rock from the south is being pushed against and over the northern part. (And over the OWL.) One model has the slab of rock being forced up by some structure about 8 km deep. Another model has the base of the slab (again, about 8 km deep) catching on something, which causes the leading edge to roll. The nature of the underlying structure is not known; geophysical data does not indicate a major fault nor any kind of crustal boundary along the front of the Seattle Fault, nor along the OWL, but this could be due to the limited reach of geophysical methods. Recent geological mapping at the eastern side of the Seattle Fault suggests a decollement (horizontal plane) about 18 km deep.

These models were developed in study of the western segment of the Seattle Fault. In the center segment, where it crosses surface exposures of Eocene rock associated with the OWL, the various strands of the fault – elsewhere fairly orderly – meander. The significance of this and the nature of the interaction with the Eocene rock are also not known.

Examination of the various strands of the Seattle Fault, particularly in the central section, is similarly suggestive of ripples in a flow that is obliquely crossing some deeper sill. This is an intriguing idea that could explain how local and seemingly independent features could be organized from depth, and even across a large scale, but it does not seem to have been considered. This is likely due, in part, to a paucity of information on the nature and structure of the lower crust where such a sill would exist.

=== Southern Whidbey Island Fault and RMFZ ===
The Southern Whidbey Island Fault (SWIF), running nearly parallel to the OWL from Victoria, B.C., southeast to the Cascade foothills to a point northeast of Seattle, is notable as the contact between the Coast Range block of oceanic crust to the west and the Cascades block of pre-Cenozoic continental crust to the east. It appears to connect with the more southerly oriented right-lateral Rattlesnake Mountain Fault Zone (RMFZ) straddling Rattlesnake Mountain (near North Bend), which shows a similar deep-seated contact between different kinds of basement rock. At the southern end of Rattlesnake Mountain – exactly where the first lineament of the OWL is encountered – at least one strand of the RMFZ (the others are hidden) turns to run by Cedar Falls and up the Cedar River. Other faults to the south also show a similar turn, (Note: Recent mapping (DGER Geological Map GM73) shows a multiplicity of fault strands; it is possible that these seemingly arcuate faults may be artefacts of slightly confused mapping.) suggesting a general turning or bending across the OWL, yet such a bend is not apparent in the pattern of physiographic features that express the OWL. With awareness that the Seattle Fault and the RMFZ are the edges of a large sheet of material which is moving north, there is a distinct impression that these faults, and even some of the topographical features, are flowing around the corner of the Snoqualmie Valley. If it seems odd that a mountain should "float" around a valley: bear in mind that while the surface relief is about three-quarters of a kilometer (half a mile) in height, the material flowing could be as much as eighteen kilometers deep. (The analogy of icebergs moving around a submerged sandbar is quite apt.) It is worth noting that Cedar Butte – a minor prominence just east of Cedar Falls – is the southwesternmost exposure in the region of some very old Cretaceaous (pre-Cenozoic) metamorphic rock. It seems quite plausible that there is some well-founded and obdurate obstruction at depth, around which the shallower and younger sedimentary formations are flowing. In such a context the observed arcuate fault bends would be very natural.

== Broader context ==
It is generally assumed that the pattern of the OWL is a manifestation of some deeper physical structure or process (the "ur-OWL"), which might be elucidated by studying the effects it has on other structures. As has been shown, study of features that should interact with OWL has yielded very little: a tentative age range (between 45 and 17 million years), suggestions that the ur-OWL arises from deep in the crust, and evidence that the OWL is not (contrary to expectations) itself a boundary between oceanic and continental crust.

The lack of results so far suggests that the broader context of the OWL should be considered. Following are some elements of that broader context, which may – or may not – relate in some way to the OWL.

=== Plate tectonics ===
The broadest and fullest context of the OWL is the global system of plate tectonics, driven by convective flows in the Earth's mantle. The primary story on the western margin of North America is the accretion, subduction, obduction, and translation of plates, micro-plates, terranes, and crustal blocks between the converging Pacific and North American plates. (Note: For an excellent geological history of Washington, including plate tectonics, see the Burke Museum web site.)

The principal tectonic plate in this region (Washington, Oregon, Idaho) is the North American Plate, consisting of a craton of ancient, relatively stable continental crust and various additional parts that have been accreted; this is essentially the whole of the North American continent. The interaction of the North American plate with various other plates, terranes, etc., along its western margin is the primary engine of geology in this region.

Since the breakup of the Pangaea supercontinent in the Jurassic (about 250 million years ago) the main tectonic story here has been the North American Plate's subduction of the Farallon Plate (see below) and its remaining fragments (such as the Kula, Juan de Fuca, Gorda, and Explorer plates). As the North American Plate overrides the last of each remnant it comes into contact with the Pacific Plate, generally forming a transform fault, such as the Queen Charlotte Fault running north of Vancouver Island, and the San Andreas Fault on the coast of California. Between these is the Cascadia subduction zone, the last portion of a subduction zone that once stretched from Central America to Alaska.

This has not been a steady process. 50 Ma (million years) ago there was a change in the direction of motion of the Pacific plate (as recorded in the bend in the Hawaiian-Emperor seamount chain). This had repercussions on all the adjoining plates, and may have had something to do with initiation of the Straight Creek Fault, and the end of the Laramide orogeny (the uplift of the Rocky Mountains). This event may have set the stage for the OWL, as much of the crust in which it is expressed was formed around that epoch (the early Eocene); this may be when the story of the OWL starts. Other evidence suggests a similar plate reorganization around 80 Ma, possibly connected with the start of the Laramide orogeny. Ward (1995) claimed at least five "major chaotic tectonic events since the Triassic". Each of these events is a possible candidate for creating some condition or structure that affected the OWL or ur-OWL, but knowledge of what these events were or their effects is itself still chaotic.

Complicating the geology is a stream of terranes – crustal blocks – that have been streaming north along the continental margin for over 120 Ma (and probably much, much earlier), what has recently been called the North Pacific Rim orogenic Stream (NPRS). However, these terranes may be incidental to the OWL, as there are suggestions that local tectonic structures may be substantially affected by deeper and much older (e.g., Precambrian) basement rock, and even lithospheric mantle structures.

=== Subduction of the Farallon and Kula Plates ===
Roughly 205 million years ago (during the Jurassic period) the Pangaea supercontinent began to break up as a rift separated the North American Plate from what is now Europe, and pushed it west against the Farallon Plate. During the subsequent Cretaceous Period (144 to 66 Ma ago) the entire Pacific coast of North America, from Alaska to Central America, was a subduction zone. The Farallon plate is notable for having been very large, and for subducting nearly horizontally under much of the United States and Mexico; it is likely connected with the Laramide Orogeny. About 85 Ma ago the part of the Farallon plate from approximately California to the Gulf of Alaska separated to form the Kula Plate.

The period 48–50 Ma (mid-Eocene) is especially interesting as this is when the subducted Kula—Farallon spreading ridge passed below what is now the OWL. (Note: A slightly variant view is that this piece of the Kula plate had broken off to form the Resurrection Plate, so this was actually the Resurrection—Farallon spreading ridge.) This also marks the onset of the Oregon rotation, possibly with rifting along the OWL, and the initiation of the Queen Charlotte and Straight Creek Faults. The timing seems significant, but how all of these might be connected is unknown.

Around 30 Ma ago part of the spreading center between the Farallon Plate and Pacific Plate was subducted under California, putting the Pacific plate into direct contact with the North American plate and creating the San Andreas Fault. The remainder of the Farallon Plate split, with the part to the north becoming the Juan de Fuca Plate; parts of this subsequently broke off to form the Gorda Plate and Explorer Plate. By this time the last of the Kula Plate had been subducted, initiating the Queen Charlotte transform fault on the coast of British Columbia; coastal subduction has been reduced to just the Cascadia Subduction Zone under Oregon and Washington.

=== Newberry Hotspot Track – Brothers Fault Zone ===
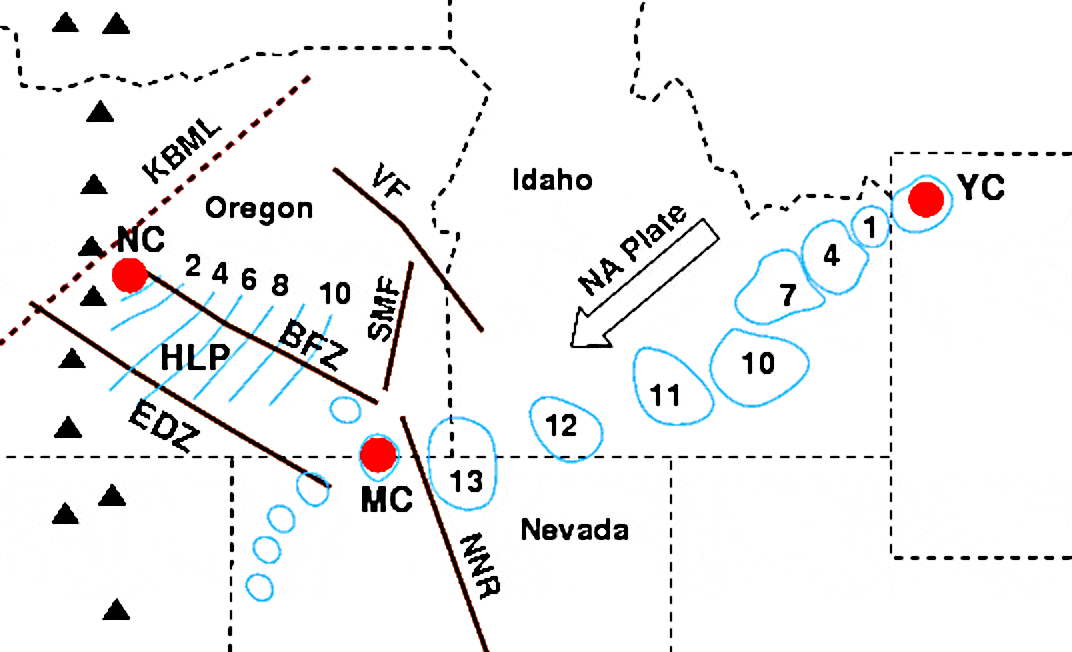
Age progressive rhyolitic lavas (light blue) from the McDermitt Caldera (MC) to the Yellowstone Caldera (YC) track the movement of the North American plate over the Yellowstone Hotspot. Similar age progressive lavas across the High Lava Plains (HLP) towards the Newberry Caldera (NC) have been termed the Newberry Hotspot Track, but this goes the wrong direction to be attributed to movement of the plate over a hotspot. Numbers are ages in millions of years. VF = Vale Fault, SMF = Steens Mountain Fault, NNR = North Nevada Rift.

The Newberry Hotspot Track – a series of volcanic domes and lava flows closely coincident with the Brothers Fault Zone (BFZ) – is of interest because it is parallel to the OWL. Unlike anything on the OWL, these lava flows can be dated, and they show a westward age progression from an origin at the McDermitt Caldera on the Oregon-Nevada border to the Newberry Volcano. Curiously, the Yellowstone hotspot also appears to have originated in the vicinity of the McDermitt Caldera, and is generally considered to be closely associated with the Newberry magmatism. But while the track of the Yellowstone hotspot across the Snake River Plain conforms to what is expected from the motion of the North American Plate across some sort of "hotspot" fixed in the underlying mantle, the Newberry "hotspot" track is oblique to the motion of the North American Plate; this is inconsistent with the hotspot model.

Alternative models include: 1) flow of material from the top layer of the mantle (asthenosphere) around the edge of the Juan de Fuca Plate (a.k.a. "Vancouver slab"), 2) flows reflecting lithospheric topography (such as the edge of the craton), 3) faulting in the lithosphere, or 4) extension of the Basin and Range province (which in turn may be due to interactions between the North American, Pacific, and Farallon Plates, and possibly with the subduction of the triple point where the three plates came together), but none is yet fully accepted. (Note: E.g., Xue & Allen (2006) concluded that the Newberry track is the product of a lithosphere-controlled process (such as lithospheric faulting or Basin and Range extension); Zandt & Humphreys (2008) disagree, arguing for mantle flow around the sinking Gorda—Juan de Fuca slab.) These models generally attempt to account only for the source of the Newberry magmatism, attributing the "track" to pre-existing weakness in the crust. No model yet accounts for the particular orientation of the BFZ, or the parallel Eugene-Denio or Mendocino Fault Zones (see map).

=== Bermuda Hotspot Track? ===
It was noted as early as 1963 that the OWL seems to align with the Kodiak-Bowie Seamount chain. A 1983 paper by Morgan suggested that this seamount—OWL alignment marks the passage some 150 Ma ago of the Bermuda hotspot. (Note: Recapitulated by Vink, Morgan & Vogt (1985) in a popular article in Scientific American.) (This same passage has also been invoked to explain the Mississippi Embayment. However, substantial doubt has been raised as to whether Bermuda is truly a "hotspot", and lacking any supporting evidence this putative hotspot track is entirely speculative.

The 1983 paper also suggested that passage of a hot spot weakens the continental crust, leaving it vulnerable to rifting. But might the relation actually run the other way: do some of these "hotspots" accumulate in zones where the crust is already weakened (by means as yet unknown)? The supposed Newberry hotspot track may exemplify this (see Megashears, below), but application of this concept more generally is not yet accepted. Application to the OWL would require resolving some other questions, such as how traces of a ca. 150 Ma event resisted being swept north into Alaska to influence a structure believed to be no older than 41 Ma (see Straight Creek Fault). Possibly there is some explanation, but geology has not yet found it.

=== Orofino Shear Zone ===
The OWL gets faint, perhaps even terminates, just east of the Oregon—Idaho border where it hits the north-trending Western Idaho Shear Zone (WISZ), (Note: Also known as the western Idaho suture zone, or the Salmon River suture zone, depending on what portion of its long history is being addressed.) a nearly vertical tectonic boundary between the accreted oceanic terranes to the west and the plutonic and metamorphic rock of the North American craton (the ancient continental core) to the east. From the Mesozoic till about 90 Ma (mid-Cretaceous) this was the western margin of the North American continent, into which various off-shore terranes were crashing into and then sliding to the north.

Near the town of Orofino (just east of Lewiston, Idaho) something curious happens: the craton margin makes a sharp right-angle bend to the west. What actually happens is the truncation of the WISZ by the WNW-trending Orofino Shear Zone (OSZ), which can be traced west roughly parallel with the OWL until it disappears below the Columbia River Basalts, and southeast across Idaho and possibly beyond. The truncation occurred between 90 and 70 Ma ago, possibly due to the docking of the Insular super-terrane (now the coast of British Columbia). This was a major left-lateral transform fault, with the northern continuation of the WISZ believed to be one of the faults in the North Cascades. A similar offset is seen between the Canadian Rocky Mountains in British Columbia and the American Rocky Mountains in southern Idaho and western Wyoming.

Then another curious thing happens: before the west-trending craton margin turns north, it seems to loop south towards Walla Walla (near the Oregon border) and the Wallula Gap (see orange-line here, or dashed-line here). (Although southeastern Washington is pretty thoroughly covered by the Columbia River Basalts, a borehole in this loop recovered rock characteristic of the craton.) It seems that the OSZ may have been offset, perhaps by the Hite Fault, but, contrary to the regional trend, headed south. If this is a cross-cutting offset it would have to be younger than the OFZ (less than 70 Ma), and older than the OWL, which it does not offset. That the OWL and the OFZ are parallel (along with many other structures) suggests something in common, perhaps a connection at a deeper level. But this offsetting relationship indicates that they were created separately.

=== Megashears ===
The OFZ (also called the Trans-Idaho Discontinuity) is a local segment of a larger structure that has only recently been recognized, the Great Divide Megashear. East of the WISZ this turns to the southeast (much as the OWL may be doing past the Wallula Gap) to follow the Clearwater fault zone down the continental divide near the Idaho—Montana border to the northwestern corner of Wyoming. From there it seems to connect with the Snake River–Wichita fault zone, which passes through Colorado, and Oklahoma, (Note: A few sources have described this general trend the Olympic—Wichita Lineament. This is inaccurate. The Great Divide Megashear, even if it existed past the Cascades, would be well north of the Olympic Peninsula, while the OWL, if it is presumed to connect with the Snake Fault zone (via the Vale zone) misses the Great Divide Megashear, and likely Wichita as well. This lineament is said to dextrally offset the Colorado Lineament, said to run from the Grand Canyon to Lake Superior.) and possibly further. (Note: A "Montana—Florida Lineament" and even a "Mackenzie—Missouri Lineament" (from the Mackenzie River valley in the Yukon to Florida) have been claimed by S. Warren Carey, but are not generally recognized. For an interesting trip outside of mainstream science read about the Expanding Earth theory.) There is a significant age discrepancy here. Whereas the OFZ is a mere 90 to 70 Ma old, this megashear is ancient, having been dated to the Mesoproterozoic – about a billion years ago. The Snake River–Wichita fault zone is of a similar age. What appears to be happening is exploitation of ancient weaknesses in the crust. This could explain the Newberry "hotspot track": parallel weaknesses in the crust open as the Brothers, Eugene—Denio, and Mendocino Fault Zones in response to development of the Basin and Range Province; magma from the event that initiated the Yellowstone hotspot (and possibly the Columbia River and other basalt flows) simply exploits the faults of the Brothers Fault Zone. The other faults do not develop as "hotspot tracks" simply because there is no magma source nearby. Similarly, it may be that the OWL reflects a similar zone of weakness, but does not develop as a major fault zone because it is too far from the stresses of the Basin and Range Province.

This could also explain why the OWL seems possibly aligned with the Kodiak-Bowie Seamount chain in the Gulf of Alaska, especially as the apparent motion is the wrong direction for the OWL to be a mark of their past passage. They are also on the other side of the spreading centers, though that does suggest a pure speculation that these postulated zones of weakness could be related to transform faults from the spreading center.

=== Precambrian basement ===
Following the Great Divide Megashear into the mid-continent reveals something interesting: a widespread pattern of similarly trending (roughly NW-SE) fault zones, rifts, and aeromagnetic and gravitational anomalies. (Note: Especially dramatic is the 2005 "Precambrian Crystalline Basement Map of Idaho".) Although some of the faults are recent, the NW trending zones themselves have been attributed to continental-scale transcurrent shearing at about 1.5 Ga – that's billions of years ago – during the assembly of Laurentia (the North American continent).

Curiously, there is another widespread pattern of parallel fault zones, etc., of various ages trending roughly NE-SW, including the Midcontinent Rift System, the Reelfoot Rift (in the New Madrid Seismic Zone), and others. (Note: The KBML and other less well known trends in Oregon and Washington have a similar orientation, but the context is so different that they are generally excluded from studies of midcontinental geology.) These fault zones and rifts occur on tectonic boundaries that date to the Proterozoic – that is, 1.8 to 1.6 billions of years old. They are also roughly parallel to the Ouachita— Appalachian mountains, raised when Laurentia merged with the other continents to form the Pangaea supercontinent some 350 million years ago. It is now believed that these two predominant patterns reflect ancient weaknesses in the underlying Precambrian basement rock, which can be reactivated to control the orientation of features formed much later.

Such linkage of older and younger features seems very relevant to the OWL's troubling age relationships. The possible involvement of the deep Precambrian basement does suggest that what we see as the OWL might be just the expression in shallower and transitory terranes and surface processes of a deeper and persistent ur-OWL, just as ripples in a stream may reflect a submerged rock, and suggests that surficial expression of the OWL may need to be distinguished from a deeper ur-OWL. But neither the applicability of this to the OWL nor any details have been worked out.

== See also ==
- Geology of the Pacific Northwest

== Sources ==
OSTI: DOE's Office of Scientific and Technical Information. See also Energy Citations Database.

- Armstrong, R. L.; Ward, P. L. (1993), Late Triassic to earliest Eocene magmatism in the North American Cordillera: implications for the Western Interior Basin, Geological Association of Canada, pp. 49–72, Special Paper 39.
- Baars, D. L. (1976), "The Colorado Plateau aulocogen – Key to Continental scale basement rifting", in Podwysocki, M.; Earle, J. (eds.), Proc. of the 2nd International Conference on Basement Tectonics, pp. 157–164.
- Baars, D. L.; Stevenson, G. M. (1981), "Tectonic evolution of the Paradox Basin, Utah & Colorado", Geology of the Paradox Formation, Rocky Mountain Association of Geologists, pp. 22–31.
- Baars, D. L.; Thomas, W. A.; Drahovzal, J. A.; Gerhad, L. C. (1995), "Preliminary investigations of the basement tectonic fabric of the conterminous USA", in Ojakangas, R. W.; Dickas, A. B.; Green, J. C. (eds.), Basement Tectonics 10, Kluwer Academic Publishers, pp. 149–158.
- Beck, M. E. (June 1976), "Discordant paleomagnetic pole positions as evidence of regional shear in the Western Cordillera of North America", American Journal of Science, 276 (6): 694–712, Bibcode:1976AmJS..276..694B, doi:10.2475/ajs.276.6.694.
- Blakely, R. J.; Wells, R. E.; Weaver, C. S.; Johnson, S. Y. (February 2002), "Location, structure, and seismicity of the Seattle fault zone, Washington: Evidence from aeromagnetic anomalies, geologic mapping, and seismic-reflection data", Geological Society of America Bulletin, 114 (2): 169–177, Bibcode:2002GSAB..114..169B, doi:10.1130/0016-7606(2002)114<0169:LSASOT>2.0.CO;2.
- Brandon, M. T. (1985), Mesozoic melange of the Pacific Rim complex, western Vancouver Island; Trip 7 (PDF), archived from the original (PDF) on 2010-06-20.
- Brandon, M. T. (1989), "Geology of the San Juan—Cascades Nappes, Northwestern Cascade Range and San Juan Islands", in Joseph, N. L.; et al. (eds.), Geological guidebook for Washington and adjacent areas, Washington State Department of Natural Resources, Division of Geology and Earth Resources, pp. 137–162, Information Circular 86.
- Brocher, Tom; Wells, Ray E; Lamb, Andrew P.; Weaver, Craig S. (April 2017), "Evidence for Distributed Clockwise Rotation of the Crust in the Northwestern United States from Fault Geometries and Focal Mechanisms: Clockwise Rotation in the NW US", Tectonics, 36: 787–818, doi:10.1002/2016TC004223
- Brookfield, M. E. (1 August 1993), "Neoproterozoic Laurentia—Australia fit", Geology, 21 (8): 683–686, Bibcode:1993Geo....21..683B, doi:10.1130/0091-7613(1993)021<0683:NLAF>2.3.CO;2.
- Breitsprecher, K.; Thorkelson, D. J.; Groome, W. G.; Dostal, J. (April 2003), "Geochemical confirmation of the Kula-Farallon slab window beneath the Pacific Northwest in Eocene time" (PDF), Geological Society of America Bulletin, 31 (4): 351–354, Bibcode:2003Geo....31..351B, doi:10.1130/0091-7613(2003)031<0351:gcotkf>2.0.co;2.
- Caggiano, J. A.; Duncan, D. W., eds. (March 1983), Preliminary interpretation of the tectonic stability of the reference repository location, Cold Creek syncline, Hanford site, Rockwell Hanford Operations Report RHO-BW-ST-19P. 130 pages.

Note: some catalogs misidentify this item as edited by K. A. Bergstrom. Also, another item with the same editor, title, and year (report SD-BWI-TI-111, 175 pages) is actually the rough-draft of this item.

- Campbell, N. P. (January 1989), "Structural and stratigraphic interpretation of rocks under the Yakimia fold belt, Columbia Basin, based on recent surface mapping and well data", in Reidel, S. P.; Hooper, P. R. (eds.), Volcanism and tectonism on the Columbia River flood-basalt province, Geological Society of America Special Papers, vol. 239, Geological Society of America, pp. 209–222, doi:10.1130/SPE239-p209, ISBN 9780813722399, Special Paper 239.
- Cantwell, T.; Nelson, P.; Webb, J.; Orange, A. S. (15 April 1965), "Deep resistivity measurements in the Pacific Northwest", Journal of Geophysical Research, 70 (9): 1931–1937, Bibcode:1965JGR....70.1931C, doi:10.1029/JZ070i008p01931.
- Carey, S. Warren (1981). The Expanding Earth: A Symposium, Earth Resources Foundation, University of Sydney, February 10-14, 1981. The University. ISBN 978-0-85901-209-6. Archived from the original on 2009-10-26. Google Books
- Catchings, R. D.; Mooney, W. D. (10 January 1988), "Crustal Structure of the Columbia Plateau: Evidence for continental rifting", Journal of Geophysical Research, 93 (B1): 459–474, Bibcode:1988JGR....93..459C, doi:10.1029/JB093iB01p00459, archived from the original on 2011-06-06.
- Cheney, E. S. (December 1999), Geological map of the Easton area, Kittitas County, Washington, Washington Division of Geology and Earth Resources, 11 p. scale 1:31,680, Open File Report 99-4.
- Cheney, E. S. (2003), "Regional Tertiary sequence stratigraphy and regional structure on the eastern flank of the Central Cascade Range, Washington", in Swanson, Terry (ed.), Western Cordillera and Adjacent Areas, vol. 4, Geological Society of America, pp. 177–199, doi:10.1130/0-8137-0004-3.177, ISBN 9780813756042
- Cheney, E. S.; Hayman, N. W. (January 2007), "Regional tertiary sequence stratigraphy and structure on the eastern flank of the central Cascade Range, Washington", in Stelling, P. L.; Tucker, D. S. (eds.), Floods, faults, and fire: Geological Field Trips in Washington State and Southwest British Columbia, vol. 9, Geological Society of America, pp. 179–208, doi:10.1130/2007.fld009(09), ISBN 978-0-8137-0009-0.
- Cheney, E. S.; Hayman, N. W. (2009), "The Chiwaukum Structural Low: Cenozoic shortening of the central Cascade Range, Washington State, USA", Geological Society of America Bulletin, 121 (7–8): 1135–1153, Bibcode:2009GSAB..121.1135C, doi:10.1130/B26446.1.
- Christiansen, R. L.; Foulger, G. R.; Evans, J. R. (October 2002), "Upper-mantle origin of the Yellowstone hotspot" (PDF), Geological Society of America Bulletin, 114 (10): 1245–1256, Bibcode:2002GSAB..114.1245C, doi:10.1130/0016-7606(2002)114<1245:UMOOTY>2.0.CO;2.
- Cowan, D. S. (June 1982), "Geological evidence for post-40 m.y. B.P. large-scale northward displacement of part of southeastern Alaska", Geology, 10 (6): 309–313, Bibcode:1982Geo....10..309C, doi:10.1130/0091-7613(1982)10<309:GEFPMB>2.0.CO;2.
- Cox, R. T.; Van Arsdale, R. B. (September 2002), "The Mississippi Embayment, North America; a first order continental structure generated by the Cretaceous superplume mantle event", Journal of Geodynamics, 34 (2): 163–176, Bibcode:2002JGeo...34..163C, doi:10.1016/S0264-3707(02)00019-4.
- Davis, G. A. (1977), "Tectonic evolution of the Pacific Northwest, Precambrian to present", Preliminary safety analysis report, WNP-1/4, amendment 23, subappendix 2R C, Washington Public Power Supply System, Inc..
- Davis, W. M. (7 May 1926), "The value of outrageous geological hypotheses", Science, 63 (1636): 463–468, Bibcode:1926Sci....63..463D, doi:10.1126/science.63.1636.463, PMID 17754905, S2CID 432860.
- Dickinson, W. R. (19 May 2004), "Evolution of the North American Cordillera" (PDF), Annual Review of Earth and Planetary Sciences, 32 (5): 13–45, Bibcode:2004AREPS..32...13D, doi:10.1146/annurev.earth.32.101802.120257, archived from the original (PDF) on 2008-10-02.
- Dragovich, J. D.; Logan, R. L.; Schasse, H. W.; Walsh, T. J.; Lingley, W. S. Jr.; Norman, D. K.; Gerstel, W. J.; Lapen, T. J.; Schuster, J. E.; Meyers, K. D. (2002), Geologic Map of Washington – Northwest Quadrant (PDF), Washington Division of Geology and Earth Resources, 3 sheets, scale 1:250,000, 72 p. text, Geological Map GM–50.
- Dragovich, J. D.; Anderson, M. L.; Walsh, T. J.; Johnson, B. L.; Adams, T. L. (2007), Geologic map of the Fall City 7.5-minute quadrangle, King County, Washington, Washington Division of Geology and Earth Resources, 1 sheet, scale 1:24,000, 16 p. text, Geological Map GM–67.
- Dragovich, J. D.; Walsh, T. J.; Anderson, M. L.; Hartog, R.; DuFrane, S. A.; Vervoot, J.; Williams, S. A.; Cakir, R.; Stanton, K. D.; Wolff, F. E.; Norman, D. K.; Czajkowski, J. L. (February 2009), Geologic map of the North Bend 7.5-minute quadrangle, King County, Washington, Washington Division of Geology and Earth Resources, 1 sheet, scale 1:24,000, 39 p. text, Geological Map GM–73.
- Dragovich, J. D.; Stanton, B. W. (2007), Darrington—Devils Mountain Fault, Skagit and Island Counties, Washington, Washington Division of Geology and Earth Resources, scale 1:31,104, 2 plates and text, Open File Report 2007-2.
- Dragovich, J. D.; Stanton, B. W.; Lingley Jr., W. S.; Griesel, G. A.; Polenz, M. (2003), Geologic Map of the Oso 7.5-minute Quadrangle, Skagit and Snohomish Counties, Washington (PDF), Washington Division of Geology and Earth Resources, 1 sheet, scale 1:24,000, Open File Report 2003-11.
- Essman, J. E. (2003). The Case for NE-SW Extension in Northeast Oregon (PDF) (Masters Thesis). Orgegon State University.
- Figge, J. (2009), Evolution of the Pacific Northwest: An Introduction to the Historical Geology of the Washington State and Southern British Columbia, Northwest Geological Institute, archived from the original on 2009-12-19.
- Fleck, R. J.; Criss, R. E. (2004), "Location, Age, and Tectonic Significance of the Western Idaho Suture Zone (WISZ)" (PDF), USGS Report, Open-File Report, U.S. Geological Survey: 12, Bibcode:2004usgs.rept...12F, doi:10.3133/ofr20041039, Open-File Report 2004-1039.
- Giorgis, S.; McClelland, W. C.; Fayon, A.; Singer, B. S.; Tikoff, B. (September 2008), "Timing of deformation and exhumation in the western Idaho shear zone, McCall, Idaho", Geological Society of America Bulletin, 120 (9–10): 1119–1133, Bibcode:2008GSAB..120.1119G, doi:10.1130/B26291.1.
- Hammond, P. E. (1979), "A tectonic model for evolution of the Cascade Range", in Armentrout, J. M.; Cole, M. R.; TerBest, H. (eds.), The Cenozoic paleogeography of the Western United States, Society of Economic Paleontologists and Mineralogists, pp. 219–237.
- Haeussler, P. J.; Bradley, D. C.; Wells, R. E.; Miller, M. L. (July 2003), "Life and death of the Resurrection plate: Evidence for its existence and subduction in the northeastern Pacific in Paleocene-Eocene time", Geological Society of America Bulletin, 115 (7): 867–880, Bibcode:2003GSAB..115..867H, doi:10.1130/0016-7606(2003)115<0867:LADOTR>2.0.CO;2.
- Haugerud, R. A.; Tabor, R. W. (2009), "Geologic Map of the North Cascade Range, Washington", USGS Report, Scientific Investigations Map, U.S. Geological Survey, 2 sheets, scale 1:200,000, Bibcode:2009usgs.rept...38H, doi:10.3133/sim2940, Scientific Investigations Map 2940.
- Heller, P. L.; Tabor, R. W.; Suczek, C. A. (August 1987), "Paleogeographic evolution of the U.S. Pacific Northwest during Paleogene time", Canadian Journal of Earth Sciences, 24 (8): 1652–1667, Bibcode:1987CaJES..24.1652H, doi:10.1139/e87-159.
- Hildebrand, R. S. (2009), Did westward subduction cause Cretaceous-Tertiary orogeny in the North American Cordillera? (PDF), Geological Society of America, doi:10.1130/2009.2457, ISBN 9780813724577, Special Paper 457.
- Holdsworth, R. E.; Butler, C. A.; Roberts, A. M. (1997), "The recognition of reactivation during continental deformation" (PDF), Journal of the Geological Society, 154 (1), Journal of the Geological Society, London: 73–78, Bibcode:1997JGSoc.154...73H, doi:10.1144/gsjgs.154.1.0073, S2CID 129617734.
- Hooper, P. R.; Camp, V. E. (July 1981), "Deformation of the southeast part of the Columbia Plateau", Geology, 9 (7): 323–328, Bibcode:1981Geo.....9..323H, doi:10.1130/0091-7613(1981)9<323:dotspo>2.0.co;2.
- Hooper, P. R.; Conrey, R. M. (1989), "A model for the tectonic setting of the Columbia River basalt eruptions", in Reidel, S. P.; Hooper, P. R. (eds.), Volcanism and Tectonicism in the Columbia River Flood-Basalts Province, Geological Society of America, pp. 293–306, doi:10.1130/SPE239-p293, ISBN 9780813722399, Special Paper 239.
- Humphreys, E. D.; Dueker, K. G.; Schutt, D. L.; Smith, R. B. (December 2000), "Beneath Yellowstone: Evaluating Plume and Nonplume Models Using Teleseismic Images of the Upper Mantle" (PDF), GSA Today, 10 (12): 1–6, archived from the original (PDF) on 2017-08-08.
- Johnson, S. Y. (January 1984), "Stratigraphy, age, and paleogeography of the Eocene Chuckanut Formation, northwest Washington", Canadian Journal of Earth Sciences, 21 (1): 92–106, Bibcode:1984CaJES..21...92J, doi:10.1139/e84-010.
- Johnson, S. Y.; Blakely, R. J.; Stephenson, W. J.; Dadisman, S. V.; Fisher, M. A. (January 2004), "Active shortening of the Cascadia forearc and implications for seismic hazards of the Puget Lowland" (PDF), Tectonics, 23 (1): TC1011, Bibcode:2004Tecto..23.1011J, doi:10.1029/2003TC001507.
- Johnson, S. Y.; Potter, C. J.; Armentrout, J. M.; Weaver, C. S.; Finn, C.; Weaver, C. S. (March 1996), "The Southern Whidbey Island fault – An active structure in the Puget Lowland, Washington", Geological Society of America Bulletin, 108 (3): 334–354, Bibcode:1996GSAB..108..334J, doi:10.1130/0016-7606(1996)108<0334:TSWIFA>2.3.CO;2.
- Johnson, S. Y.; Dadisman, S. V.; Childs, J. R.; Stanley, W. D. (July 1999), "Active tectonics of the Seattle fault and central Puget Sound, Washington – Implications for earthquake hazards", Geological Society of America Bulletin, 111 (7): 1042–1053, Bibcode:1999GSAB..111.1042J, doi:10.1130/0016-7606(1999)111<1042:ATOTSF>2.3.CO;2.
- Jones, D. L.; Silbering, N. J.; Hillhouse, J. (November 1977), "Wrangellia – a displaced terrane in northwestern North America", Canadian Journal of Earth Sciences, 14 (11): 2565–2577, Bibcode:1977CaJES..14.2565J, doi:10.1139/e77-222.
- Jones, D. L.; Cox, A.; Coney, P.; Beck, M. E. (November 1982), "The Growth of Western North America", Scientific American, vol. 247, no. 5, pp. 70–84, Bibcode:1982SciAm.247e..70J, doi:10.1038/scientificamerican1182-70.
- Karlstrom, K. E.; Humphreys, E. D. (October 1998), "Persistent influence of Proterozoic accretionary boundaries in the tectonic evolution of southwestern North America—Interaction of cratonic grain and mantle modification events" (PDF), Rocky Mountain Geology, 33 (2): 161–179, Bibcode:1998RMGeo..33..161K, doi:10.2113/33.2.161, archived from the original (PDF) on 2008-04-24.
- Kelsey, H. M.; Sherrod, B. L.; Nelson, A. R.; Brocher, T. M. (November–December 2008), "Earthquakes generated from bedding plane-parallel reverse faults above an active wedge thrust, Seattle fault zone", Geological Society of America Bulletin, 120 (11/12): 1581–1597, Bibcode:2008GSAB..120.1581K, doi:10.1130/B26282.1.
- Kuehn, S. C. (May 1995). The Olympic-Wallowa Lineament, Hite Fault System, and Columbia River Basalt Group Stratigraphy in Northeast Umatilla County, Oregon (Masters Thesis). Washington State University.
- Lonn, J. D.; McFaddan, M. D. (1999), Geologic Map of the Montana part of the Wallace 30' x 60' quadrangle (PDF), Montana Bureau of Mines and Geology, Open File Report MBMG 388.
- Madsen, J. K.; Thorkelson, D. J.; Friedman, R. M.; Marshall, D. D. (February 2006), "Cenozoic to Recent plate configurations in the Pacific Basin: Ridge subduction and slab window magmatism in western North America" (PDF), Geosphere, 2 (1): 11–34, Bibcode:2006Geosp...2...11M, doi:10.1130/GES00020.1.
- Magill, J.; Cox, A. (March 1981), "Post-Oligocene tectonic rotation of the Oregon Western Cascade Range and the Klamath Mountains", Geology, 9 (3): 127–131, Bibcode:1981Geo.....9..127M, doi:10.1130/0091-7613(1981)9<127:PTROTO>2.0.CO;2.
- Marshak, S.; Paulsen, T. (February 1996), "Midcontinent U.S. fault and fold zones – A legacy of Proterozoic intracratonic extensional tectonism?", Geology, 24 (2): 151–154, Bibcode:1996Geo....24..151M, doi:10.1130/0091-7613(1996)024<0151:MUSFAF>2.3.CO;2.
- Martin, B. S.; Petcovic, H. L.; Reidel, S. P. (May 2005), Goldschmidt Conference 2005: Field Trip Guide to the Columbia River Basalt Group (PNNL-15221) (PDF), U.S. Dept. of Energy, Pacific Northwest National Laboratory.
- McCaffrey, R.; Qamar, A. I.; King, R. W.; Wells, R. E.; Khazaradze, G.; Williams, C. A.; Stevens, C. W.; Vollick, J. J.; Zwick, P. C. (June 2007), "Fault locking, block rotation and crustal deformation in the Pacific Northwest", Geophysical Journal International, 169 (3): 1313–1340, Bibcode:2007GeoJI.169.1315M, doi:10.1111/j.1365-246x.2007.03371.x, hdl:2445/163338.
- McCaffrey, R.; Long, M. D.; Goldfinger, C.; Zwick, P. C.; Nabelek, J. L.; Johnson, C. K.; Smith, C. (October 2000), "Rotation and plate locking at the southern Cascadia subduction zone", Geophysical Research Letters, 27 (9): 3117–3120, Bibcode:2000GeoRL..27.3117M, doi:10.1029/2000GL011768.
- McClelland, W. C.; Oldow, J. S. (August 2007), "Late Cretaceous truncation of the western Idaho shear zone in the central North American Cordillera", Geology, 35 (8): 723–728, Bibcode:2007Geo....35..723M, doi:10.1130/G23623A.1.
- McKee, B. (1972), Cascadia: The Geological Evolution of the Pacific Northwest, McGraw-Hill.
- Miller, R. B. (October 1989), "The Mesozoic Rimrock Lake inlier, southern Washington Cascades: Implications for the basement to the Columbia Embayment", Geological Society of America Bulletin, 101 (10): 1289–1305, Bibcode:1989GSAB..101.1289M, doi:10.1130/0016-7606(1989)101<1289:TMRLIS>2.3.CO;2.
- Mitchell, S. G.; Montgomery, D. R. (November 2006), "Polygenetic Topography of the Cascade Range, Washington State, USA" (PDF), American Journal of Science, 306 (9): 736–768, Bibcode:2006AmJS..306..736M, CiteSeerX 10.1.1.549.1548, doi:10.2475/09.2006.03, S2CID 54703091.
- Norton, I. O. (24 January 2006), Speculations on tectonic origin of the Hawaii hotspot.
- Moores, E. M., ed. (1990), Shaping the Earth: Tectonics of Continents and Oceans; readings from Scientific American Magazine, W. H. Freeman and Co..
- Morgan, W. J. (1 May 1983), "Hotspot tracks and the early rifting of the Atlantic", Tectonophysics, 94 (1–4): 123–139, Bibcode:1983Tectp..94..123J, doi:10.1016/0040-1951(83)90013-6.
- O'Neill, J. M.; Ruppel, E. T.; Lopez, D. A. (2007), Great Divide Megashear, Montana, Idaho, and Washington – An Intraplate Crustal–Scale Shear Zone Recurrently Active Since the Mesoproterozoic, U.S. Geological Survey, Open-File Report 2007-1280-A.
- Orr, Elizabeth L.; Orr, William N. (2012). Oregon Geology. Oregon State University Press. ISBN 978-0-87071-682-9.
- Pezzopane, S. K.; Weldon, R. (October 1993), "Tectonic role of active faulting in central Oregon", Tectonics, 12 (5): 1140–1169, Bibcode:1993Tecto..12.1140P, doi:10.1029/92TC02950.
- Raisz, Erwin (1945), "The Olympic-Wallowa Lineament" (PDF), American Journal of Science, 243A (Daly Volume): 479–485.
- Redfield, T. F.; Scholl, D. W.; Fitzgerald, P. G.; Beck, M. E. (November 2007), "Escape tectonics and the extrusion of Alaska: Past, present, and future", Geology, 35 (11): 1039–1041, Bibcode:2007Geo....35.1039R, doi:10.1130/G23799A.1.
- Reidel, S. P.; Campbell, N. P. (1989), "Structure of the Yakima Fold Belt, Central Washington", in Joseph, N.L.; et al. (eds.), Geologic guidebook to Washington and adjacent Areas (PDF), Washington State Department of Natural Resources, Division of Geology and Earth Resources, pp. 277–303, Information Circular 86, archived from the original (PDF) on 2019-01-29.
- Reidel, S. P.; Campbell, N. P.; Fecht, K. R.; Lindsey, K. A. (September 1993), Late Cenozoic structure and stratigraphy of south-central Washington, doi:10.2172/10193734, OSTI 10193734, Westinghouse Hanford Company Report WHC-SA-1764.
- Riddihough, J. B. (1982), "One Hundred Million Years of Plate Tectonics in Western Canada", Geoscience Canada, 9 (1): 28–34.
- Riddihough, R.; Finn, C.; Couch, R. (June 1986), "Klamath-Blue Mountain lineament, Oregon" (PDF), Geology, 14 (6): 528–531, Bibcode:1986Geo....14..528R, doi:10.1130/0091-7613(1986)14<528:kmlo>2.0.co;2.
- Rohay, A. C.; Davis, J. D. (1983), "Contemporary deformation in the Pasco Basin area of the central Columbia plateau", in Caggiano, J. A.; Davis, D. W. (eds.), Preliminary Interpretation of the Tectonic Stability of the Reference Repository Location, Cold Creek Syncline, Hanford site.
- Saltus, R. W. (September 1993), "Upper-crustal structure beneath the Columbia River Basalt Group, Washington: Gravity interpretation controlled by borehole and seismic studies", Geological Society of America Bulletin, 105 (9): 1247–1259, Bibcode:1993GSAB..105.1247S, doi:10.1130/0016-7606(1993)105<1247:UCSBTC>2.3.CO;2.
- Sharp, W. D.; Clague, D. A. (September 2006), "50-Ma Initiation of Hawaiian-Emperor Bend Records Major Change in Pacific Plate Motion", Science, 313 (5791): 1281–1284, Bibcode:2006Sci...313.1281S, doi:10.1126/science.1128489, PMID 16946069, S2CID 43601673.
- Shervais, J. W.; Hanan, B. B. (24 September 2008), "Lithospheric topography, tilted plumes, and the track of the Snake River–Yellowstone hot spot" (PDF), Tectonics, 27 (5): TC5004, Bibcode:2008Tecto..27.5004S, doi:10.1029/2007TC002181.
- Simpson, R. W.; Cox, A. (October 1977), "Paleomagnetic evidence for tectonic rotation of the Oregon Coast Range", Geology, 5 (10): 585–589, Bibcode:1977Geo.....5..585S, doi:10.1130/0091-7613(1977)5<585:PEFTRO>2.0.CO;2.
- Simpson, R. W.; Jachens, R. C.; Blakely, R. J.; Saltus, R. W. (10 July 1986), "A New Isostatic Residual Gravity Map of the Conterminous United States With a Discussion on the Significance of Isotatic Residual Anomalies" (PDF), Journal of Geophysical Research, 91 (B8): 8348–8372, Bibcode:1986JGR....91.8348S, doi:10.1029/JB091iB08p08348, archived from the original (PDF) on 2010-05-28.
- Sims, P. K.; Bankey, V.; Finn, C. A. (2001), Preliminary Precambrian basement map of Colorado—A geologic interpretation of an aeromagnetic anomaly map, U.S. Geological Survey, Open File Report 01-0364.
- Sims, P. K.; Lund, K.; Anderson, E. (2005), Precambrian crystalline basement map of Idaho – An interpretation of aeromagnetic data, U.S. Geological Survey, scale 1:1,000,000, Scientific Investigations Map 2884.
- Sims, P. K.; Saltus, R. W.; Anderson, E. D. (2005), Preliminary Precambrian Basement Structure Map of the Continental United States – An Interpretation of Geologic and Aeromagnetic Data (PDF), U.S. Geological Survey, Open-File Report 2006–1029.
- Skehan, J. W. (1965), "The Olympic-Wallowa lineament: A major deep-seated tectonic feature of the Pacific Northwest [abstract]", Transactions of the American Geophysical Union, 46: 71.
- Stock, J.; Molnar, P. (December 1988), "Uncertainties and implications of the Late Cretaceous and Tertiary position of North American relative to the Farallon, Kula, and Pacific plates" (PDF), Tectonics, 7 (6): 1339–84, Bibcode:1988Tecto...7.1339S, doi:10.1029/TC007i006p01339.
- Tabor, R. W. (February 1994), "Late Mesozoic and possible early Tertiary accretion in western Washington State: the Helena—Haystack mélange and the Darrington—Devils Mountain Fault Zone", Geological Society of America Bulletin, 106 (2): 217–232, Bibcode:1994GSAB..106..217T, doi:10.1130/0016-7606(1994)106<0217:LMAPET>2.3.CO;2.
- Tabor, R. W.; Frizzell, V. A. Jr. (1979), "Tertiary movement along the southern segment of the Straight Creek fault and its relation to the Olympic-Wallowa lineament in the central Cascades, Washington [abstract]", GSA Abstracts with Programs, 11 (3): 131.
- Tabor, R. W.; Frizzell, V. A. Jr.; Vance, J. A.; Naeser, C. W. (January 1984), "Ages and stratigraphy of lower and middle Tertiary sedimentary and volcanic rocks of the central Cascades, Washington: Application to the tectonic history of the Straight Creek fault", Geological Society of America Bulletin, 95 (1): 26–44, Bibcode:1984GSAB...95...26T, doi:10.1130/0016-7606(1984)95<26:AASOLA>2.0.CO;2.
- Tabor, R. W.; Frizzell, V. A Jr.; Booth, D. B.; Waitt, R. B. Jr. (2000), Geologic map of the Snoqualmie Pass 60 minute by 30 minute quadrangle, Washington, U.S. Geological Survey, scale 1:100,000, Miscellaneous Investigations Map I-2538, archived from the original on 2009-01-09.
- Thomas, G. E. (1976), "Lineament–block tectonics: North America – Cordilleran Orogen", in Podwysocki, M.; Earle, J. (eds.), Proc. of the 2nd International Conference on Basement Tectonics, pp. 361–370.
- Umhoefer, P. J.; Miller, R. B. (June 1996), "Mid-Cretaceous thrusting in the southern Coast Belt, British Columbia and Washington, after strike-slip fault reconstruction", Tectonics, 15 (2): 545–565, Bibcode:1996Tecto..15..545U, doi:10.1029/95TC03498.
- Vance, J. A.; Miller, R. B. (1994), "Another look at the Fraser River-Straight Creek Fault (FRSCF)", GSA Abstracts with Programs, 24: 88.
- Vanden Berg, M. D. (2005), Mineral Potential Report for the Monticello Planning Area (PDF), U.S. Department of the Interior, Bureau of Land Management, archived from the original (PDF) on 2012-10-07.
- Vink, G. E.; Morgan, W. J.; Vogt, P. R. (April 1985), "The Earth's Hot Spots", Scientific American, 252 (4): 41–53, Bibcode:1985SciAm.252d..50V, doi:10.1038/scientificamerican0485-50.
- Vogt, P. R.; Jung, W. Y. (2007a), "Origin of the Bermuda volcanoes and Bermuda Rise: History, Observations, Models, and Puzzles", in Foulger, G. R.; Jurdy, D. M. (eds.), Plates, Plumes, and Planetary Processes (PDF), Geological Society of America, pp. 553–591, CiteSeerX 10.1.1.484.2851, doi:10.1130/2007.2430(27), ISBN 9780813724300, Special Paper 430.
- Vogt, P. R.; Jung, W. Y. (2007b), Bermuda and the Bermuda Rise – A Poor Fit to the Classical Mantle Plume Model.
- Ward, P. L. (1995), "Subduction cycles under western North America during the Mesozoic and Cenozoic eras", in Miller, D. M.; Busby, C. (eds.), Jurassic Magmatism and Tectonics of the North American Cordillera (PDF), Geological Society of America Special Papers, vol. 299, Geological Society of America, pp. 1–45, doi:10.1130/SPE299-p1, ISBN 9780813722993, Special Paper 299, archived from the original (PDF) on 2011-07-28.
- Wells, R. E.; Coe, R. S. (10 February 1985), "Paleomagnetism and geology of Eocene volcanic rocks of southwest Washington, implications for mechanisms of tectonic rotation", Journal of Geophysical Research, 90 (B2): 1925–1947, Bibcode:1985JGR....90.1925W, doi:10.1029/JB090iB02p01925.
- Wells, R. E.; Heller, P. L. (March 1988), "The relative contribution of accretion, shear, and extension to Cenozoic tectonic rotation in the Pacific Northwest", Geological Society of America Bulletin, 100 (3): 325–338, Bibcode:1988GSAB..100..325W, doi:10.1130/0016-7606(1988)100<0325:TRCOAS>2.3.CO;2.
- Wells, R. E.; Simpson, R. W. (April 2001), "Northward migration of the Cascadia forearc in the northwestern U.S. and implications for subduction deformation", Earth Planets Space, 53 (4): 275–283, Bibcode:2001EP&S...53..275W, doi:10.1186/BF03352384.
- Wells, R. E.; Weaver, C. S.; Blakely, R. J. (August 1998), "Forearc migration in Cascadia and its neotectonic significance" (PDF), Geology, 26 (8): 769–762, Bibcode:1998Geo....26..759W, doi:10.1130/0091-7613(1998)026<0759:famica>2.3.co;2, archived from the original (PDF) on 2008-05-16.
- Wilson, D.; Cox, A. (10 July 1980), "Paleomagnetic Evidence for Tectonic Rotation of Jurassic Plutons in Blue Mountains, Eastern Oregon", Journal of Geophysical Research, 85 (B7): 3681–3689, Bibcode:1980JGR....85.3681W, doi:10.1029/JB085iB07p03681.
- Wise, D. U. (March 1963), "An outrageous hypothesis for the tectonic pattern of the North American Cordillera", Geological Society of America Bulletin, 74 (3): 357–362, Bibcode:1963GSAB...74..357W, doi:10.1130/0016-7606(1963)74[357:AOHFTT]2.0.CO;2.
- Woods, M. T.; Davies, G. F. (April 1982), "Late Cretaceous genesis of the Kula plate", Earth and Planetary Science Letters, 58 (2): 161–166, Bibcode:1982E&PSL..58..161W, doi:10.1016/0012-821X(82)90191-1.
- Wyld, S. J.; Wright, J. E. (February 2001), "New evidence for Cretaceous strike-slip faulting in the United States Cordillera and implications for terrane-displacement, deformation patterns, and plutonism" (PDF), American Journal of Science, 301 (2): 150–181, Bibcode:2001AmJS..301..150W, CiteSeerX 10.1.1.547.7335, doi:10.2475/ajs.301.2.150.
- Wyld, S. J.; Umhoefer, P. J.; Wright, J. E. (2006), "Reconstructing northern Cordilleran terranes along known Cretaceous and Cenozoic strike-slip faults: Implications for the Baja British Columbia hypothesis and other models" (PDF), in Haggart, J. W.; Enkin, R. J.; Monger, J. W. H. (eds.), Paleogeography of the North American Cordillera: Evidence For and Against Large-Scale Displacement, Geological Association of Canada, pp. 277–298, Special Paper 46, archived from the original (PDF) on 2010-06-09.
- Xue, M.; Allen, R. M. (15 April 2006), "Origin of the Newberry Hotspot Track: Evidence from shear-wave splitting" (PDF), Earth and Planetary Science Letters, 244 (1–2): 315–322, Bibcode:2006E&PSL.244..315X, doi:10.1016/j.epsl.2006.01.066.
- Zandt, G.; Humphreys, E. D. (April 2008), "Toroidal mantle flow through the western U.S. slab window" (PDF), Geology, 36 (4): 295–298, Bibcode:2008Geo....36..295Z, doi:10.1130/G24611A.1, archived from the original (PDF) on 2011-06-12.
- Zietz, I.; Hearn, B. C. Jr.; Higgins, M. W.; Robinson, G. D.; Swanson, D. A. (December 1971), "Interpretation of an Aeromagnetic Strip across the Northwestern United States", Geological Society of America Bulletin, 82 (12): 3347–3372, Bibcode:1971GSAB...82.3347Z, doi:10.1130/0016-7606(1971)82[3347:IOAASA]2.0.CO;2.
