= Owl Creek (Sugar Creek tributary) =

Stream in Ralls County, Missouri, U.S.

Coordinates: 39.576154°N 91.516821°W

Owl Creek is a stream in Ralls County in the U.S. state of Missouri. It is a tributary of Sugar Creek.

Owl Creek was so named on account of owls in the area.

== See also ==
- List of rivers of Missouri
