= Brothers Fault Zone =

Northwest-trending fault zone in Oregon, United States

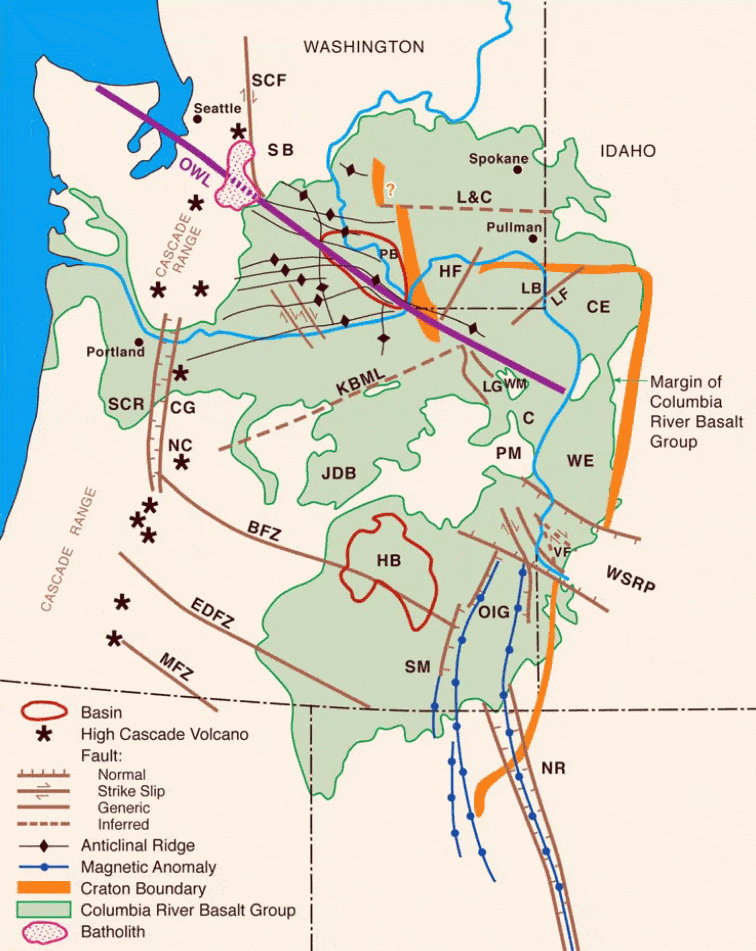
- Major geological structures in Washington and Oregon: BFZ – Brothers Fault Zone; EDFZ – Eugene–Denio Zone; MFZ – McLoughlin Zone; NR – Northern Nevada Rift; SM – Steens Mountain and fault; OIG – Oregon–Idaho Grabens; HB – Harney Basin; NC – Newberry Caldera; KBML – Klamath – Blue Mountain Lineament. Light green indicates extent of Columbia River Basalt Group flows; orange line indicates juncture of North American craton and accreted terranes. The Vale fault zone (not shown) is in the northeast corner of Oregon, near the Olympic–Wallowa Lineament (OWL).
- Location: Between Steens Mountain (east) and Newberry Volcano (west), approximately
- Coordinates: 43°48′49″N 120°36′12″W
- Country: United States
- State: Oregon

Characteristics
- Length: 160 mi (260 km) SE–NW
- Width: 50 mi (80 km)SW–NE

The Brothers Fault Zone (BFZ) is the most notable of a set of northwest-trending fault zones including the Eugene–Denio, McLoughlin, and Vale zones that dominate the geological structure of most of Oregon. These are also representative of a regional pattern of generally northwest-striking geological features ranging from Walker Lane on the California–Nevada border to the Olympic–Wallowa Lineament in Washington; these are generally associated with the regional extension and faulting of the Basin and Range Province, of which the BFZ is considered the northern boundary.

The relationships with other features is complex. At the BFZ's eastern end, near the Steens Mountain fault, the zone of surface faulting turns slightly to the south-southeast (possibly due to rotation of Nevada), then follows the Northern Nevada Rift to form the Oregon–Nevada lineament, with a total length of over 75 km (47 mi). Lavas associated with the Nevada Rift have been dated to 16.3 Ma (millions of years ago), close to the inception of basin-and-range faulting, but there is a suspicion that the rifting developed on an older strike-slip fault, possibly connected with the East Pacific Rise.

At its west end, just past the Newberry Volcano, the BFZ terminates at the north-striking Sisters Fault, part of the High Cascades geological province. But further south the Pliocene (<5 Ma) High Cascades volcanic trend is offset right-laterally about 10 to 20 km (6.2 to 12.4 mi) by the Eugene–Denio fault zone, and another 15 to 20 km (9.3 to 12.4 mi) by the McLoughlin zone.

At a possibly more fundamental level, the Brothers, Eugene–Denio, and McLoughlin zones, and possibly the Vale zone, all terminate near the Klamath – Blue Mountains Lineament (KBML; shortened and slightly misplaced on the map at right). The KBML is a prominent, 700 km (430 mi) long southwest-to-northeast-striking gravitational anomaly that crosses all of Oregon. It coincides with the southern boundary of the Columbia Embayment (the Olympic–Wallowa Lineament in Washington being the northern boundary), a region noticeably lacking in pre-Tertiary bedrock. Aside from aligning with the northwestern edge of several terranes that have accreted to the North American continent (such as the Klamath Mountains on the southern coast of Oregon, and Blue Mountains Province just north of the BFZ), the KBML has no apparent surface manifestation; it is believed to reflect a deeper structure, possible a pre-Tertiary continental margin.

The BFZ is the northern edge of the Basin and Range Province, a region of northwest directed extension, wherefore the BFZ also accommodates the offset with the Blue Mountains Province. It does this not by through-going strike-slip faulting (such as with the San Andreas Fault to the south) but by a series of hundreds of en echelon normal faults somewhat crosswise to the zone itself. Such faulting is believed to be the surface manifestation of a deeper shear zone.

The Brothers Fault Zone is also the locus of the High Lava Plains (HLP) volcanism of central and southeastern Oregon. HLP volcanism is notable for showing an age progression from 16 Ma at its eastern end (near the Oregon–Nevada–Idaho corner) to the active Newberry Volcano at its western end. This age progression mirrors the very similar progression along the track of the Yellowstone Hotspot, which appears to have a common origin. Also closely related in space and time is the eruption of the 16.6 Ma Steens Basalts, the initial and most voluminous phase of the Columbia River Basalt Group lava flows that blanket eastern Oregon and the entire southeastern quarter of Washington. These also show a similar age progression to the north; there is a great deal of debate on how all of these are related, and how they initiated. The track of the Yellowstone Hotspot is neatly explained by motion of the North American craton over a plume (hotspot) of material rising from the mantle. But this explanation fails for the so-called "Newberry hotspot" track, which lies oblique to the motion of the craton. One suggestion is that the large blob of molten rock at the head of the plume was sheared off by the advancing edge of the craton, and remained entrained in front of the craton to melt the lithosphere in a broad region, while the tail of the plume was overrun to make the Yellowstone Hotspot track. Age progressive volcanism along the Brothers Fault Zone (as well as the Steens Fault and North Nevada Rift) results from the expanding lithospheric melt opportunistically exploiting existing crustal faults.

In summary, the Brothers Fault Zone, and the related Eugene–Denio, McLoughlin, and Vale zones, appear to be deep-seated structures in accreted terranes bounded by the Klamath—Blue Mountains Lineament, which has been reactivated by Basin and Range extension, and exploited by mid-Miocene volcanism associated with the Yellowstone Hotspot.

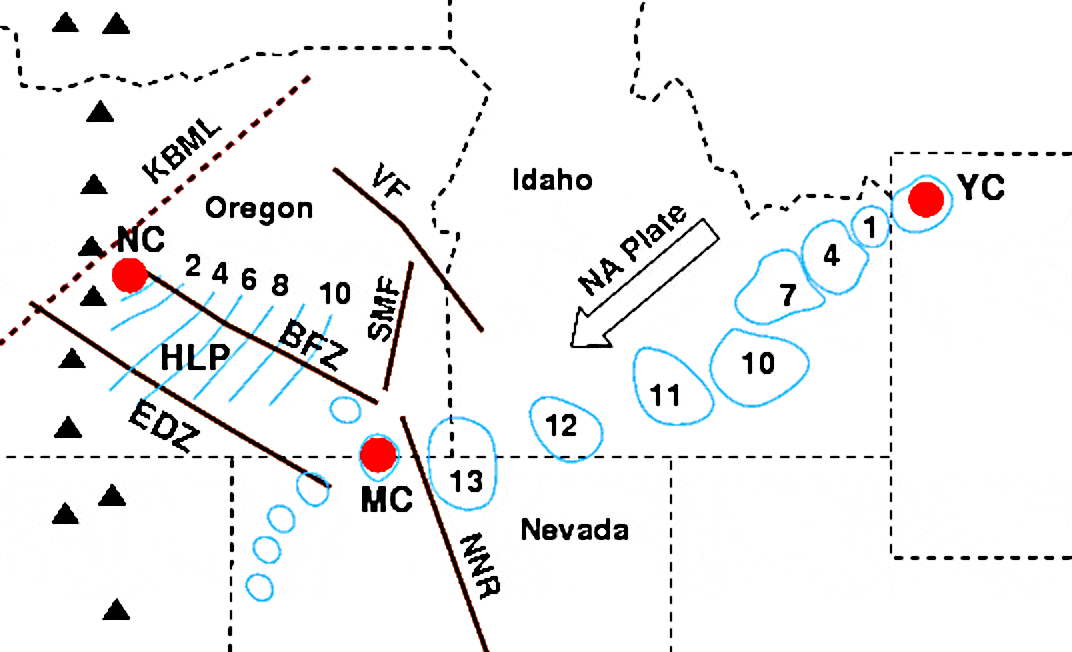
Progression of ages of rhyolitic (silicic) lavas and calderas from McDermitt Caldera to Newberry and Yellowstone calderas (red circles: MC, NC, & YC). Numbers are ages in millions of years. KBML – Klamath–Blue Mountains Lineament, HLP – High Lava Plains, EDZ – Eugene—Denio Zone, BFZ – Brothers Fault Zone, SMF – Steens Mountain Fault, VF – Vale Fault, NNR – North Nevada Rift. White arrow shows direction of North American plate, edge of the craton is approximately along the Oregon—Idaho Border, triangles are Cascades volcanoes.
