= Online Watch Link =

Online Watch Link (OWL), is a commercial web application to manage watch schemes such as Neighbourhood Watch (United Kingdom) and Business Watch. It also acts as a communications platform to allow watch coordinators and the police to send out messages and high priority alerts to members. Alerts are mostly regarding current crimes in the area such as burglary and vehicle theft. Other watch schemes are supported such as Pub Watch, School Watch, Farm Watch and Shop Watch for example.

OWL was used by Hertfordshire Constabulary until April 2024 and continues to be used by the Metropolitan Police Service. OWL was originally conceived and prototyped in early 2004 then redeveloped as a scalable application launched in June 2006 and rolled out across all districts in Hertfordshire.

As of September 2024, 250,000 alerts had been published on OWL by 5,000 police officers across 7 participating police forces that generated nearly 1 billion targeted emails sent to 500,000 registered homes.

The OWL program is to be discontinued by 1 November, since the Met has withdrawn funding for the program.

In June 2021, the OWL mobile app was launched to provide localised police alerts based on users' current location or by using a map to select zones of interest. In total, a million push notifications are sent to app users each month. (Statistics provided directly by the developers)

It was recognised by the UK Government in January 2009 by awarding it an e-Government National Award, and again in 2013 with the Prime Minister's Big Society award. A case study was published by the College of Policing in 2022.
