= Of Wondrous Legends =

American psych folk band

- Also known as: O.W.L.
- Origin: Chicago, United States
- Genres: Folk rock, psych folk
- Years active: 1968–early 1970s, 2009–present
- Members: Stephen Titra; Al Keeler; Doug Jones
- Past members: Jim Snyder; John Knutson

Of Wondrous Legends, often abbreviated as O.W.L., is an American psych folk band established in Chicago in 1968 by musician and artist Stephen Titra. Overlooked at the time, the band's sole self-titled album, recorded in 1971, was rediscovered and reissued in 2008, since when Titra has returned to perform with others as O.W.L..

== History ==
Titra was born in Chicago in 1945. He played in folk rock bands in the area, including the Uncalled Four and Rhythm's Children, who transformed into the Grateful Dead-influenced band Mountain Bus. Shortly before they recorded their only album Sundance, Titra had left the band to develop his own musical direction. He formed O.W.L. in 1968, and played his songs with bassist Jim Snyder, flautist John Knudson and vibraphonist Al Keeler in clubs in Chicago. Titra was inspired by Baroque and Pre-Raphaelite art, and his songs were later described by Allmusic as "poetic, soaring, imbued with a fondness for Romanticism and Old Europe, with a current of humanism running through the lyrics".

In 1971, his agent Frank Hogan arranged for demo recordings of his songs to be made with engineer Mal Davis. The owner of the Universal Recording Studio, Murray Allen, liked them, and agreed to fund a full album recording at the studio. A wide variety of instrumentation was used, including keyboards, vibraphone, Moog synthesizer, marimba, cellos, and flute, played by Titra, Snyder, Knudson, and other musicians. Later reviewers have commented that the album "offers genuine pastoral folk of the highest caliber", with "complex" orchestrations "giving O.W.L.'s music a lush, arty feel." The recordings have led to comparisons being made with music of the same period by Pearls Before Swine, Shawn Phillips, Tim Buckley, and The Moody Blues. Dawson Prater of Locust Music has described it as "a continuous twilight suite mixing dreamy, aspirational folk with lush chamber orchestration."

About 20 test pressings of the LP were made. Titra approached several record labels including Elektra, A&M, and Capitol, with the suggestion that it be marketed with accompanying art book of Titra's pen-and-ink drawings illustrating each song. However, the record companies each claimed that the music was difficult to market, falling into no clear niche, and without an obvious hit single. Although Chicago-based Playboy Records also showed some interest in releasing the record commercially, that too failed to come to fruition. Titra continued to play some of the songs in live shows with his mid-1970s band, Pilgrim, but the recordings were otherwise forgotten.

Titra became a multi-disciplinary artist, incorporating writing, painting and music into his work at galleries around the U.S.. He also worked extensively on illustrations for books, and on murals for schools, and as a speaker on talent development and creativity.

In 2004, Dawson Prater of Locust Music discovered one of the original test pressings of the O.W.L. record in a thrift store. The record was issued on CD in 2008 (and later vinyl), to considerable acclaim, being described at Allmusic as "among the very best previously unknown finds of the last decade". As a result, Titra revived O.W.L. in 2009, to perform a number of shows in Chicago and elsewhere, as a trio with Al Keeler and Doug Jones.
