= Owl (AOL) =

User-generated content website launched by AOL

- Website type: Internet forum
- Founded: 2010

Owl was a short-lived user-generated content site created by AOL in 2010. It was promoted as a "living, breathing library where useful knowledge, opinions and images are posted from experts the world over". At least some of the content was by paid contributors.

As of 2021, the website's URL links to a Yahoo! holding page.
