= Lake Dexter (Wisconsin) =

Lake in the state of Wisconsin, United States

- Location within Wisconsin
- Location: Wood County, Wisconsin
- Coordinates: 44°23′14″N 90°07′12″W
- Type: reservoir
- Primary inflows: Yellow River
- Primary outflows: Yellow River
- Basin countries: United States
- Surface area: 287 acres (116 ha)
- Max. depth: 17 feet (5.2 m)
- Surface elevation: 988 ft (301 m)

Lake Dexter is a reservoir in the U.S. state of Wisconsin. The lake has a surface area of 287 acres (116 ha) and reaches a depth of 17 feet (5.2 m).

Lake Dexter was formed in 1965 when a dam on the Yellow River was completed. The lake takes its name from Dexter township. A variant name is "Dexter Lake".
