= Puget Sound faults =

Seismic faults in Washington State

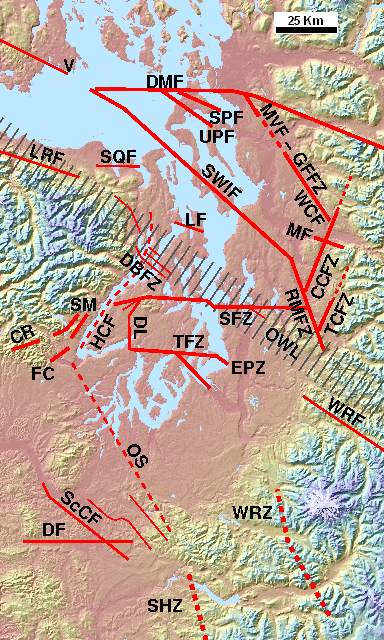
The principal Puget Sound faults (approximate location of known extents) and other selected peripheral and minor faults. Southern tip of Vancouver Island and San Juan Islands at top left (faults not shown), Olympic Mountains at center left, Mount Rainier at lower right (near WRZ). Faults north to south: Devils Mountain, Utsalady Point, Strawberry Point, Mount Vernon Fault/Granite Falls FZ/Woods Creek, Monroe Fault, Little River, Sequim, Southern Whidbey Island Fault, Cherry Creek, Tokul Creek, Rattlesnake Mountain Fault Zone, Lofall, Canyon River, Frigid Creek, Saddle Mountain faults, Hood Canal, Dabob Bay, Seattle Fault Zone, Dewatto Lineament, Tacoma Fault Zone, East Passage, White River (extends east), Olympia Structure, Scammon Creek, Doty (extends west), Western Rainier Zone, Saint Helens Zone (extends south). Also shown: Victoria (V), part of the Leech River Fault (unlabeled), and part of the Olympic–Wallowa Lineament.

The Puget Sound faults under the heavily populated Puget Sound region (Puget Lowland) of Washington state form a regional complex of interrelated seismogenic (earthquake-causing) geologic faults. These include (from north to south, see map) the:

- Devils Mountain Fault
- Strawberry Point and Utsalady Point faults
- Southern Whidbey Island Fault (SWIF)
- Rogers Belt (Mount Vernon Fault/Granite Falls Fault Zone)
- Cherry Creek Fault Zone
- Rattlesnake Mountain Fault Zone
- Seattle Fault
- Tacoma Fault
- Saddle Mountain Faults
- Olympia structure (suspected fault)
- Doty Fault
- Saint Helens Zone and Western Rainier Zone

== General background ==
=== Earthquake sources and hazard ===
The Puget Sound region (Puget Lowland) of western Washington contains the bulk of the population and economic assets of the state, and carries seven percent of the international trade of the United States. All this is at risk of earthquakes from three sources:

- A great subduction earthquake, such as the magnitude M 9 1700 Cascadia earthquake, caused by slippage of the entire Cascadia subduction zone, from approximately Cape Mendocino in northern California to Vancouver Island in British Columbia.
- Intraslab (Benioff zone) earthquakes, such as the M 6.7 2001 Nisqually earthquake, caused by slippage or fracturing on a small part of the subducting plate at a depth of around 50 km (31 miles).
- Relatively shallow crustal earthquakes, generally less than 25 km (16 miles) deep, caused by stresses and faulting in the near-surface crustal structures. The energy released depends on the length of the fault; the faults here are believed capable of generating earthquakes as great as M 6 or 7.

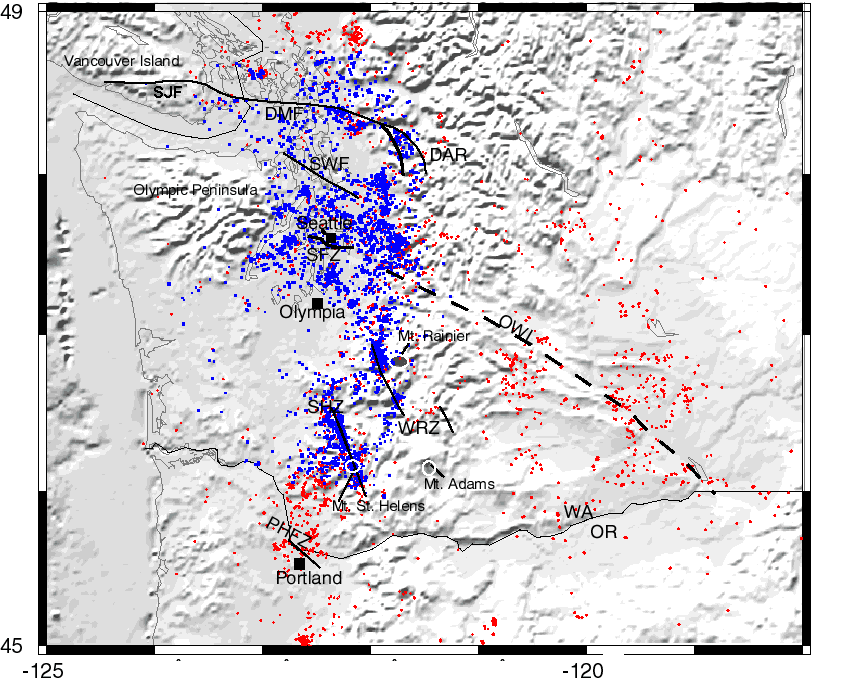
Concentration of mid-crustal (10–20 km deep) seismicity in the Puget Lowland. (Fig. 48 from USGS OFR 99-311)

While the great subduction events release much energy (around magnitude 9), that energy is spread over a large area, and largely centered near the coast. The energy of the somewhat smaller Benioff earthquakes is likewise diluted over a relatively large area. The largest intra-crustal earthquakes have about the same total energy (which is about one-hundredth of a subduction event), but since they are closer to the surface they will cause more powerful shaking, and, therefore, more damage.

One study of seismic vulnerability of bridges in the Seattle – Tacoma area estimated that an M 7 earthquake on the Seattle or Tacoma faults would cause nearly as much damage as a M 9 subduction earthquake. Because the Seattle and Tacoma faults run directly under the biggest concentration of population and development in the region, more damage would be expected, but all the faults reviewed here may be capable of causing severe damage locally, and disrupting the regional transportation infrastructure, including highways, railways, and pipelines. Links with more information on various hazards can be found at Seattle Fault.

The Puget Sound region is not just potentially seismic, it is actively seismic. Mapping from the Pacific Northwest Seismic Network shows that the bulk of the earthquakes in western Washington are concentrated in four places: in two narrow zones under Mount Saint Helens and Mount Rainier, along the DDMFZ, and under Puget Sound between Olympia and approximately the Southern Whidbey Island Fault. The southern limit nearly matches the southern limit of the glaciation; possibly the seismicity reflects rebound of the upper crust after being stressed by the weight of the glacial ice.

=== Discovery ===
Thick glacial and other deposits, heavy vegetation, urban development, and a topography of sharp relief and rapid erosion obscures the surface expression of faults in this region, and has hindered their discovery. The first definite indications of most of these faults came from gravitational mapping in 1965, and their likely existence noted on mapping in 1980 and 1985. As of 1985 only the Saddle Mountain Faults had been shown to have Holocene activity (since the last ice age, about 12,000 years ago). Not until 1992 was the first of the lowland faults, the Seattle Fault, confirmed to be an actual fault with Holocene activity, and the barest minimum of its history established.

Discovery of faults has been greatly facilitated with the development of LIDAR, a technique that can generally penetrate forest canopy and vegetation to image the actual ground surface with an unprecedented accuracy of approximately one foot (30 cm). An informal consortium of regional agencies has coordinated LIDAR mapping of much of the central Puget Lowland, which has led to discovery of numerous fault scarps which are then investigated by trenching (paleoseismology). Marine seismic reflection surveys on Puget Sound where it cuts across the various faults have provided cross-sectional views of the structure of some of these faults, and an intense, wide-area combined on-shore/off-shore study in 1998 (Seismic Hazards Investigation in Puget Sound, or SHIPS) resulted in a three-dimensional model of much of the subsurface geometry. Aeromagnetic surveys, seismic tomography, and other studies have also contributed to locating and understanding these faults.

=== Geological setting ===
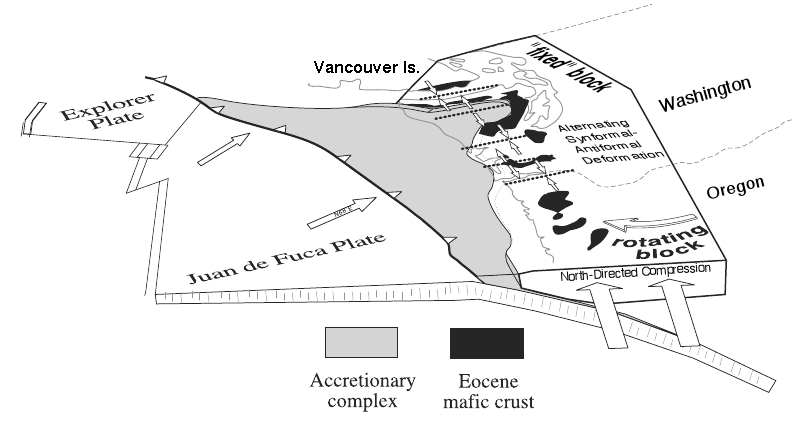
Simplified view of tectonic forces affecting Washington. The "accretionary complex" (in grey) is sediments and basalts that have accumulated in the trough where the Juan de Fuca plate bends downward. The lobe extending past Vancouver Island is where bending of the subduction zone to the south raised a wrinkle (now the Olympic Mountains) in the subducting plate. A stream of terranes that have been flowing northward in the trough above the subduction zone are being caught between this wrinkle and the basement rock ("fixed block") of the North Cascades, the latter consisting of other terranes which have accreted to the North American craton. As a result, Washington is crumpling in a series of folds (dotted lines show synclines and anticlines) and faults, and Oregon is rotating in a manner similar to a jack-knifing trailer. Folding has exposed patches of Crescent Formation basalt ("mafic crust", black). (USGS)

The ultimate driver of the stresses that cause earthquakes are the motions of the tectonic plates: material from the Earth's mantle rises at spreading centers, and moves out as plates of oceanic crust which eventually are subducted under the more buoyant plates of continental crust. Western Washington lies over the Cascadia subduction zone, where the Juan de Fuca plate is subducting towards the east (see diagram, right). This is being obliquely overridden by the North American plate coming out of the northeast, which has formed a bend in the subducting plate and in the forearc basin above it. This bend has distorted the subducting slab into an arch that has lifted the Olympic Mountains and prevented them from subducting. For the past 50 million years or so (since the early Eocene epoch) these have been thrust by subduction up against the North Cascades ("fixed block" in the diagram), which sit on the North American plate. This forms a pocket or trough – what one local geologist calls the "big hole between the mountains" – between the Cascades on the east and the Olympic Mountains and Willapa Hills on the west. This pocket is catching a stream of terranes (crustal blocks about 20 to 30 km thick) which the Pacific plate is pushing up the western edge of North America, and in the process imparting a bit of clockwise rotation to southwestern Washington and most of Oregon; the result has been characterized as a train wreck. These terranes were covered by the basalts of the Crescent Formation (part of Siletzia). Folding and faulting has exposed these basalts in some places (black areas in diagram); the intervening basins have been filled by various sedimentary formations, some of which have been subsequently uplifted. Glacially deposited and shaped fill covers most of the lower elevations of Puget Sound. This is the Puget Lowland. The principal effects of this complex interplay of forces on the near-surface crust underlying the Puget Lowland are:

- The basement rock of the Crescent Formation is being forced up on the southern, eastern, and northern flanks of the Olympic Mountains, and at various folds (wrinkles).
- Some upper-crustal formations (such as the Western and Eastern Melange Belts, see map) have been pushed onto the older (pre-Tertiary) basement of the North Cascades.
- There is a general north or northeast directed compression within the Lowland causing folds, which eventually break to become dip-slip (vertical movement) thrust or reverse faults.
- Some strike-slip (horizontal) movement is expected along the peripheral faults (such as Southern Whidbey Island and Saddle Mountain faults).

Further complicating this is a feature of unknown structure and origin, the Olympic–Wallowa Lineament (OWL). This is a seemingly accidental alignment of topographic features that runs roughly east-southeast from the north side of the Olympic Peninsula to the Wallowa Mountains in northeastern Oregon. It aligns with the West Coast fault and Queen Charlotte Fault system of strike-slip fault zones (similar to the San Andreas Fault in California) on the west side of Vancouver Island, but does not itself show any significant or through-going strike-slip movement. It is of interest here because the various strands of the Seattle Fault change orientation where they appear to cross the OWL, and various other features, such as the Rosedale monocline and Olympia structure, and a great many local topographical features, have parallel alignments. It may also be the original location of the Darrington—Devils Mountain Fault (the dashed line "X" at the top of the following map). The OWL appears to be a deep-seated structure over which the shallower crust of the Puget Lowland is being pushed, but this remains speculative.

=== Uplift and basin pattern ===
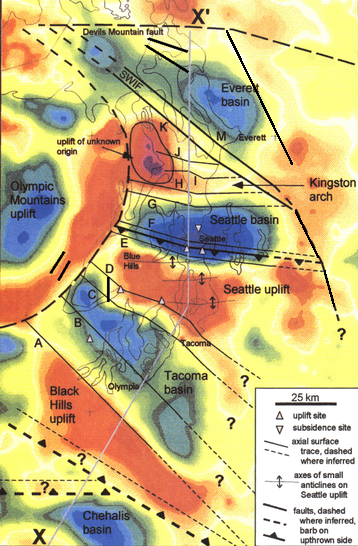
Bouguer gravity anomaly map of the Puget Sound region showing basins and uplifts, and principal faults and folds, over outline of Puget Sound, Hood Canal, and east end of Strait of Juan de Fuca. Blue and green generally indicate basins (with lower density sedimentary rock), red is generally uplifted basalt of the Crescent Formation. Unlabeled lines northwest of Everet Basin = Strawberry Point & Utsalady Point faults; E-F = Seattle Fault zone; C-D = Tacoma Fault zone; A = Olympia Fault; Doty Fault is east–west dashed line just north of Chehalis Basin; curved dashed line = Hood Canal Fault; Dewatto Lineament (western flank of Seattle uplift) runs south from "D", Saddle Mountain Faults are due west. (Adapted from Pratt et al. 1997, plate 1.)

Most of these "faults" are actually zones of complex faulting at the boundaries between sedimentary basins (synclines, "∩") and crustal uplifts (anticlines, "∪"). There is a general pattern where most of these faults partition a series of basins and uplifts, each about 20 km wide. From the north these are (see the map at right):

- Devils Mountain Fault zone (including Strawberry Point and Utsalady Point faults)

∪ Everett Basin

- Southern Whidbey Island Fault (SWIF)

∩ "Uplift of unknown origin" (Port Ludlow)

- Kingston arch (Lofall Fault)

∪ Seattle Basin

- Seattle Fault zone (approx. lines E-F)

∩ Seattle Uplift

- Tacoma Fault Zone (approx. line C)

∪ Tacoma Basin

- Olympia fault (approx. line A)

∩ Black Hills Uplift

- Doty Fault / Scammon Creek Fault (dashed lines)

∪ Chehalis Basin

The Hood Canal Fault (and its possible extensions) and Saddle Mountain faults to the west are believed to form the western boundary to all this. On the east, the Devils Mountain Fault connects with the south striking Darrington Fault (not shown) which runs to the OWL, and the Southern Whidbey Island Fault extends via the Rattlesnake Mountain Fault Zone (dashed line) to the OWL. South of the OWL a definite eastern boundary has not been found, with some indications it is indefinite. (E.g., the Olympia Fault is aligned with and appears to be the northernmost member of a set of faults between Olympia and Chehalis that may extend to the Columbia River, and there has been a suggestion that the Tacoma Fault may connect with the White River—Naches River fault on the east side of the Cascades.)

The uplift and basin pattern is continued to the west and southwest by the Grays Harbor Basin, Willapa Hills Uplift, and Astoria Basin, but it is not known if these are bounded by faults in the same manner as in the Puget Sound region.

=== Structural models ===
==== Thrust sheet hypothesis ====
It is believed that all of these faults, folds, basins, and uplifts are related. According to the preeminent model, the "Puget Lowland thrust sheet hypothesis", these faults, etc., occur within a sheet of crust about 14 to 20 km deep that has separated from and is being thrust over deeper crustal blocks. Most of this thrust sheet consists of the Crescent Formation (corresponding to the Siletz River volcanics in Oregon and Metchosin Formation on Vancouver Island), a vast outpouring of volcanic basalt from the Eocene epoch (about 50 million years ago), with an origin variously attributed to a seamount chain, or continental margin rifting (see Siletzia). This "basement" rock is covered with sedimentary deposits similar to the Chuckanut Formation, and more recent (typically Miocene) volcanic deposits. The Seattle uplift, and possibly the Black Hills uplift, consist of Crescent Formation basalt that was exposed when it was forced up a ramp of some kind. This ramp could be either in the lower crustal blocks, or where the thrust sheet has split and one part is being forced over the next. Faults and folds may develop where the thrust sheet is being bent, or where the leading edge is thrust over softer, weaker sedimentary deposits, and breaks off and slumps.

If, as this model suggests, the various faults are interconnected within the thrust sheet, there is a possibility that one earthquake could trigger others. This prospect is especially intriguing as a possible explanation of a cluster of seismic events around 1100 years ago.

==== Seismotectonic modeling ====
In the previous study seismicity, surface geology, and geophysical data were modeled in order to examine the fault structuring of the upper crust. Another model (of Stanley, Villaseñor & Benz 1999, USGS Open-File Report 99–0311) – not so much in competition with the first as complementing it – used seismic and other data to create a 3-D tectonic model of the whole crust; this was then analyzed using finite element methods to determine regional geodynamic characteristics.

A principal finding is that "[c]rustal seismicity in the southern Puget Sound region appears to be controlled by a key block of Crescent Formation occurring just south of the Seattle fault." More particularly, the concentration of seismicity under Puget Sound south of the Seattle Fault is attributed to uplift of that block, bounded by the Seattle, Tacoma, and Dewatto faults on the north, south, and west (the eastern boundary is not determined), creating the Seattle Uplift. And it is suggested that the Great Seattle Quake of approximately 1,100 years ago, and other coseismic events in southern Puget Sound around that time, were a single event that affected this entire block, with a magnitude of around 8, possibly triggered by an earthquake deeper in the crust.

Very little is known about the structure of the deep crust (below about 30 km or 19 miles), though this and other seismic tomography studies (such as Ramachandran 2001) provide tantalizing glimpses.

For the following reviews the primary source of information is the U.S. Geological Survey's Quaternary fault and fold database (QFFDB), which includes details of discovery, a technical description, and bibliography for each fault; a specific link is provided (where available) at the end of each section.

== Devils Mountain Fault ==
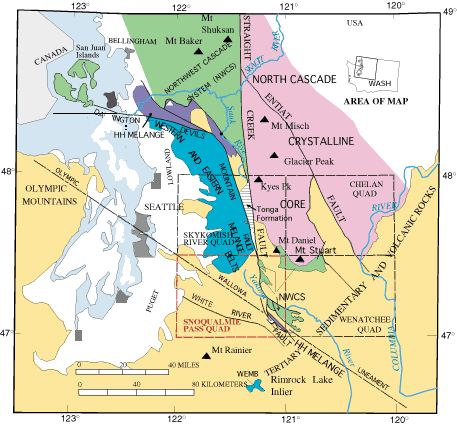
Puget Lowland and other areas divided from the "North Cascade Crystalline Core" by the Straight Creek Fault. The green colored area on the left has been pushed north, the purple area ("HH Melange") on the Darrington—Devils Mountain Fault originally being at or southwest of the Olympic Wallowa Lineament. (Fig. 1 from USGS I-2538, modified.)

The Devils Mountain Fault (DMF) runs about 125 km (75 miles) from the town of Darrington in the Cascade foothills due west to the northern tip of Whidbey Island, and on towards Victoria, British Columbia, where the DMF is believed to join the Leech River fault system at the southern end of Vancouver Island. At Darrington it is seen to connect with the Darrington Fault, which runs nearly south 110 km to converge with the Straight Creek Fault (SCF), and then to turn near Easton to align with the Olympic–Wallowa Lineament; together these are known as the Darrington—Devils Mountain Fault Zone (DDMFZ).

The Devils Mountain Fault separates two similar but distinctive ensembles of Mesozoic (pre-Tertiary, before the dinosaurs died) or older rock. On the north is the Helena—Haystack mélange (HH mélange, purple in the diagram at right), on the south the Western and Eastern mélange belts (WEMB, blue). There are some interesting relationships here. E.g., HH mélange rock has been found in Manastash Ridge, 110 km to the south (look for the small sliver of purple near the bottom of the diagram). Also, the sedimentary Chuckanut Formation (part of the NWCS, green) north of the DMF correlates to the Suak and Roslyn Formations just north of Manastash Ridge. All this is explained by right-lateral strike-slip motion on the Straight Creek Fault, which initiated about 50 to 48 Ma (millions of years ago). This is just after the terrane carrying the Olympic Mountains came into contact with the North American continent. These mélanges may have been off-shore islands or seamounts that were caught between the Olympic terrane and the North American continent, and were pushed up (obducted) onto the latter. Other similar rock has been found at the Rimrock Lake Inlier (bottom of diagram), in the San Juan Islands, and in the Pacific Coast Complex along the West Coast Fault on the west side of Vancouver Island. It appears the entire DDMFZ and Leech River fault system was pushed onto the early continental margin from an original alignment along the OWL. This is an important observation because the Strawberry Point, Utsalady Point, Southern Whidbey Island, and various other unnamed faults lying between the DDMFZ and the OWL – all of which converge at the western end of the DDMFZ – seem to be intermediate versions of the DDMFZ.

Movement on the southern segment of the DDMFZ that converges with the SCF – the Darrington Fault – was, as on the SCF itself, right-lateral. And like the SCF, strike-slip motion died out between 44 and 41 MA (due to plutonic intrusions). But the western segment – the Devils Mountain Fault – has left-lateral movement. This is because the Olympic terrane is moving (relative to North America) northeast; its continued clockwise rotation is akin to a giant wheel rolling up the western side of the North Cascade crystalline core. The geology also suggests that the DMF is moving obliquely up a ramp that rises to the east, possibly an ancient coastal shore.

The Devils Mountain Fault is seismically active, and there is evidence of Holocene offsets. If the entire 125 km length ruptured in a single event the resulting earthquake could be as large as magnitude 7.5. However, there are indications that the fault is segmented, which might limit rupturing and earthquake magnitude.

- USGS QFFDB Fault #574, Devils Mountain Fault

== Strawberry Point and Utsalady Point faults ==
Strands of the east-striking Devils Mountain Fault cross the northern tip of Whidbey Island at Dugualla Bay and north side of Ault Field (Whidbey Island Naval Air Station). Just four miles (6 km) south the city of Oak Harbor straddles several stands of the Utsalady Point Fault (UPF) as they head roughly east-southeast towards Utsalady Point at the north end of Camano Island. And in between these two the Strawberry Point Fault (SPF) skirts the south side of Ault Field, splits into various strands that bracket Strawberry Point, and then disappear (possibly ending) under the delta of the Skagit River. Both the SPF and UPF are said to be oblique-slip transpressional; that is, the faults show both horizontal and vertical slip as the crustal blocks are pressed together. These faults also form the north and south boundaries of uplifted pre-Tertiary rock, suggesting that the faults come together at a lower level, much like one model of the Seattle and Tacoma faults, but at a smaller scale. Marine seismic reflection surveys on either side of Whidbey Island extend the known length of these faults to at least 26 and 28 km (about 15 miles). The true length of the UPF is likely twice as long, as it forms the southern margin of an aeromagnetic high that extends another 25 km to the southeast. Trenching on the UPF (at a scarp identified by LIDAR) shows at least one and probably two Holocene earthquakes of magnitude 6.7 or more, the most recent one between AD 1550 to 1850, and possibly triggered by the 1700 Cascadia earthquake. These earthquakes probably caused tsunamis, and several nearby locations have evidence of tsunamis not correlated with other known quakes.

While there is a bit of uplifted pre-Tertiary rock between the SPF and UPF, this does not truly fit the uplift and basin pattern described above because of the small scale (2 km wide rather than around 20), and because the uplift here is entirely like a wedge being popped out between two nearly vertical faults, rather than being forced over a ramp such as is involved with the Seattle and Tacoma faults. Nor does this uplift delineate any significant basin between it and the Devils Mountain Fault. On the basis of marine seismic reflection surveying in the Strait of Juan de Fuca it has been suggested that the DMF, SPF, and UPF are structurally connected (at least in the segment crossing Whidbey Island).

- USGS QFFDB Fault #571, Strawberry Point Fault
- USGS QFFDB Fault #573, Utsalady Point Fault

== Southern Whidbey Island Fault ==
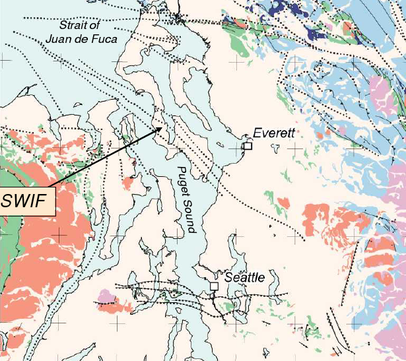
Location and known extent (prior to 2004) of Southern Whidbey Island Fault (SWIF). Also shown: Devils Mountain, Strawberry Point, and Utsalady Point faults (crossing northern Whidbey Island), Seattle Fault zone, southern part of Rattlesnake Mountain Fault Zone, Tokul Creek Fault (striking NNE from RMFZ). Not shown: southeastward extension of SWIF and various faults running northward from the RMFZ and east of Everett. This map is approximately one-quarter the scale of the map below. (USGS)

The Southern Whidbey Island Fault (SWIF) is a significant terrane boundary manifested as an approximately four mile wide zone of complex transpressional faulting with at least three strands. Marine seismic reflection surveys show it striking northwest across the eastern end of the Strait of Juan de Fuca. Just south of Victoria, British Columbia it intersects the west-striking Devils Mountain Fault (reviewed above), and either merges with it, or crosses (and possibly truncates) it to connect with the Leech River Fault. The Leech River Fault has been identified as the northern edge of the Crescent Formation (aka Metchosin Formation, part of the Siletzia terrane that underlies much of western Washington and Oregon). Seismic tomography studies show that this portion of the SWIF marks a strong contrast of seismic velocities, such as is expected of Crescent Formation basalts in contact with the metamorphic basement rocks of the Cascades geologic province to the east.

To the southeast the SWIF passes through Admiralty Inlet (past Port Townsend) and across the southern part of Whidbey Island, crossing to the mainland between Mukilteo and Edmonds. This section of the SWIF forms the southwestern side of the Everett Basin (see map), which is notably aseismic in that essentially no shallow (less than 12 km deep) earthquakes have occurred there, or on the section of the SWIF adjoining it, in the first 38 years of instrumental recording. Yet it is also notable that "most seismicity in the northern Puget Sound occurs along and southwest of the southern Whidbey Island fault at typical depths of 15–27 km within the lower part of the Crescent Formation."

The contrast of seismic velocities seen to the northwest is lacking in this section, suggesting that it is not the Coast Range—Cascade contact. The significance of this – whether the edge of the Crescent Formation (and implicitly of the Siletz terrane) turns southward (discussed below), or the metamorphic basement is supplanted here by other volcanic rock – is not known. It has been suggested that a corresponding change in the character of the SWIF may reflect a change in the direction of regional crustal strain. Prior to 2000, prominent aeromagnetic anomalies strongly suggested that the fault zone continued southeast, perhaps as far as the town of Duvall, but this was uncertain as the SWIF is largely concealed, and the faint surface traces generally obliterated by urban development. Since 2000 studies of LIDAR and high-resolution aeromagnetic data have identified scarps near Woodinville which trenching has confirmed to be tectonically derived and geologically recent.

Subsequent mapping shows the SWIF wrapping around the eastern end of the Seattle Basin to merge with the Rattlesnake Mountain Fault Zone (RMFZ); the RMFZ, despite the approximately 15° bend and different context, is now believed to be the southern extension of the SWIF. Reckoned between Victoria and approximately Fall City the length of the SWIF is around 150 km (90 miles).

It has been suggested that the SWIF might extend past its intersection with the RMFZ (with only peripheral strands turning to join the RMFZ) to cross the Cascades and eventually merge with or cross the Olympic–Wallowa Lineament; a study of regional features suggests such a pattern. But detailed mapping just past the intersection shows only a complex and confused pattern of faulting, with no indication that there is, or is not, through-going faulting. Mapping of areas further east that might clarify the pattern is not currently planned.

Paleoseismological studies of the SWIF are scant. One study compared the relative elevation of two marshes on opposite sides of Whidbey Island, and determined that approximately 3,000 years ago an earthquake of M 6.5–7.0 caused 1 to 2 meters of uplift. Another study identified an unusually broad band of scarps passing between Bothell and Snohomish, with several scarps in the vicinity of King County's controversial Brightwater regional sewage treatment plant showing at least four and possibly nine events on the SWIF in the last 16,400 years. Such seismic hazards were a major issue in the siting of the plant, as it is tucked between two active strands, and the influent and effluent pipelines cross multiple zones of disturbed ground.

- USGS QFFDB Fault #572, Southern Whidbey Island Fault

== Rogers Belt ==
North of Everett is an area of parallel ridges and stream drainages oriented approximately NW-SE, evident even on non-geological maps. These ridges (part of a broader regional pattern that reflects the roots of the former Calkins Range) are formed of sediments that collected in the Everett basin during the Eocene, and were subsequently folded by northeast-directed compression against the older Cretaceous and Jurassic rock to the east that bound the Puget Lowland. At the edge of this older rock is the Rogers Belt, a geologically interesting zone running from the area of Sultan (due east of Everett) to Mount Vernon (just north of the bend in the Devils Mountain Fault). Observing these topographical features, some parallel gravity gradients, and a "very active zone of minor seismicity", William Rogers inferred in 1970 a "fault or other major structural feature".

The Bellingham Bay—Chaplain fault zone was first mapped by Cheney in 1976 as running from near Chaplain Lake (north of Sultan) NNW past Bellingham Bay. Doubts on the connectivity of these faults led to abandonment of this name in 1986 when Cheney mapped the Mount Vernon fault (MVF) from near Sultan northwest past Lummi Island (west side of Bellingham Bay, visible at the top of the map), crossing the Devils Mountain Fault (DMF, part of the Darrington—Devils Mountain Fault Zone) near Mount Vernon. Cheney also mapped the Lake Chaplain Fault, parallel and just east of the MVF, from Lake Chaplain to Granite Falls.

Detailed mapping of this area since 2006 has revealed a complex pattern of faults. At the northern end the right-lateral McMurray Fault Zone (MFZ) straddles Lake McMurray, just south of the Devils Mountain Fault, and is suspected of being a major bounding fault. This is located on a topographical lineament that aligns with Mount Vernon to the north, and, to the south, the city of Granite Falls and Lake Chaplain (just north of Sultan).

The Woods Lake Fault, running past Lake Chaplain, corresponds closest to the mapped position of the southern end of Cheney's Mount Vernon Fault. However, subsequent mapping shows that the Woods Creek Fault (WCF), a four-mile wide strip of oblique-slip and strike-slip faults just to the west and passing directly under Sultan, appears to be the more significant fault, and better aligned with Mount Vernon. Both of these faults (and some others) appear to terminate against the left-lateral Sultan River Fault at the western margin of the NNE-striking Cherry Creek Fault Zone (CCFZ; see next section). The principal zone of faulting extends from the Woods Creek Fault to the Granite Falls Fault Zone (GFFZ), slightly offset from the WCF and running under the town of Granite Falls. Although the intervening section has not been mapped, geologists believe the GFFZ connects with the McMurray FZ to the north, and forms the eastern boundary of the Everett Basin.

These faults cut through the Western Mélange Belt (WMB; blue area in map), exposed from North Bend (on Interstate 90) to Mount Vernon. The WMB is an assemblage of Late Jurassic and Cretaceous rock (some of it as much as 166 million years old) collected in the accretionary wedge (or prism) of a subduction zone. The presence of detritus from the Idaho Batholith indicates a former location closer to southern Idaho. Some of these faults possibly developed in the Mesozoic, when these deposits were in the accretionary wedge; the cross-cutting NE and NNE-striking faults that form the various basins resulted from a subsequent change to transtension.

Early Eocene igneous units in the area appear to be part of a 49- to 44- Ma magmatic belt that appeared just after the arrival of Siletzia, and possibly associated with that event.

The strongly expressed topographical lineaments at the north end of the Rogers Belt pose a perplexing problem, as they show no definite offset where they are bisected by the left-lateral oblique-slip Devils Mountain Fault. The alternative, that younger faulting in the Rogers Belt has offset the DMF – Cheney argued that the MVF had offset the DMF 47 km. to the north, past Lummi Island – is contrary to the prevailing consensus that the DMF is not offset.

== Cherry Creek Fault Zone ==
The Cherry Creek fault zone (CCFZ) was discovered in 2010 while mapping the area at the north end of the Rattlesnake Mountain fault zone (RMFZ). From a point just north of Carnation the eastern edge of the CCFZ (here it is about three-quarters of a mile wide) can be traced up Harris Creek, crossing the upper reach of Cherry Creek, eventually reaching the town of Sultan. Here the main strand on the western edge merges with the Sultan River Fault under the Sultan River. It is projected to extend past Lake Chaplain, and perhaps to the east end of Mount Pilchuck. It is deemed a "major active or potentially active" structure.

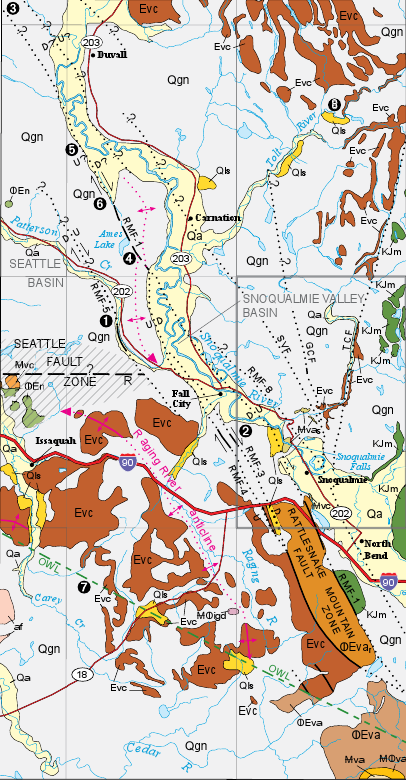
Simplified geologic map of the Snoqualmie Valley (east of Seattle) from North Bend to Duvall, showing various strands of the Rattlesnake Mountain Fault (RMF), and the Snoqualmie Valley (SVF), Griffin Creek (GCF), and Tokul Creek (TCF) faults. The stream NNE of Carnation lies in the Cherry Creek Fault Zone. Southeastern limit of Southern Whidbey Island Fault at Duvall (3), other faults south of I-90 not shown. Tiger Mountain is the uplifted "Evc" formations southeast of Issaquah, between I-90 and Hwy. 18. (Figure 2 from DGER Geological Map GM-73)

In the crowded field of active or potentially active fault zones that have been discovered in the lower Snoqualmie Valley, the Cherry Creek fault zone is particularly notable because east of Duvall it passes through a hotspot of active seismicity, including the 1996 M_{L} 5.3 Duvall earthquake. Offsets in the east–west oriented Monroe Fault (south side of the Skykomish River), earthquake focal mechanisms, and kinematic indications show that the CCFZ is a left-lateral strike-slip fault, possibly with some oblique motion (up on the eastern side).

The CCFZ appears to be related to the parallel Tokul Creek fault zone to the south; both appear to be conjugate faults to the northwest-trending SWIF. The Tokul Creek Fault (TCF) strikes NNE from Snoqualmie, aligned with a possible offset of the Western Melange Belt and with a valley that cuts through to the Skykomish River; it is now believed to be of regional significance.

== Rattlesnake Mountain Fault Zone ==
Rattlesnake Mountain is a prominent NNW trending ridge just west of North Bend (about 25 miles east of Seattle). It is coincident with, and possibly a result of uplift on, the Rattlesnake Mountain Fault Zone (RMFZ), a band of at least eleven faults that show both dip-slip (vertical) and right-lateral strike-slip motion. (See the adjacent map. In the map above these are represented by the pair of dotted lines at the lower right. A different mountain and fault zone of the same name are located near Pasco; see QFFDB Fault #565)

The southern end of Rattlesnake Mountain is truncated at the Olympic–Wallowa Lineament (OWL), and the faults turn easterly to merge with the OWL. The northern end of the mountain falls off where it crosses the eastern end of the Seattle Fault, which in turn terminates at the RMFZ; Rattlesnake Mountain forms the eastern edge of the Seattle Uplift.

The RMFZ continues NNW past Fall City and Carnation, where strands of the RMFZ have been mapped making a gentle turn of 15 to 20° west to meet the Southern Whidbey Island Fault zone (SWIF, discussed above); the RMFZ is therefore considered to be an extension of the SWIF. The relationship between these two fault zones is not entirely clear. Slippage along the SWIF would be expected to continue east-southeast until it merged with the OWL, but instead appears to be taking a shortcut ("right step") along the RMFZ. This is where the SWIF encounters the edge of the Western and Eastern Melange Belts (remnants of a mid-Cretaceous subduction zone); the RMFZ is where the Seattle Uplift is being forced against the Western Melange belt

To the north the Melange Belt is manifested as the Rogers Belt, a zone of low-amplitude folding stretching from Monroe to Mount Vernon; the apparent western edge of this zone is on-strike with the RMFZ. South of Monroe the folds of the Rogers Belt are obscured by subsequent volcanic formations, but other faults parallel to the RMFZ (e.g., the Snoqualmie Valley and Johnson's Swamp fault zones) extend the general trend of NNW faulting as far as Monroe.

(Rattlesnake Mountain Fault Zone not included in QFFDB.)

=== Coast Range Boundary Fault ===
The Coast Range Boundary Fault (CRBF) is hypothesized, expected on the basis of tectonic considerations, which may correlate in part with one or more currently known faults, or may involve as yet undiscovered faulting. Simply put, the basement rock on the west side of Puget Sound does not match the basement rock on the east side. West of Puget Sound the tectonic basement of the Coast Range geologic province is the approximately 50 million year (Ma) old marine basalts of the Crescent Formation, part of the Siletzia terrane that underlies western Washington and Oregon. East of Puget Sound the basement of the Cascades province is various pre-Tertiary (older than 65 Ma) metamorphic rock. Somewhere between Puget Sound and Cascades foothills these two geological provinces come into contact. As the juxtaposition of various disparate tectonic structures in northwest Washington requires significant strike-slip movement, it is further expected that this contact will be a major fault.

The northern end of the Crescent Formation (aka Metchosin Formation) has been identified as the east–west trending Leech River Fault on the southern tip of Vancouver Island. This turns and runs just south of Victoria, nearly in-line with the SWIF. Seismic tomography studies show a change in seismic velocities across the northern end of the SWIF, suggesting that this is also part of the Coast Range—Cascade contact. It therefore seems reasonable that the rest of the SWIF (and its apparent extension, the RMFZ) follows the Coast Range—Cascade contact, and (these faults being active) constitutes the CRBF.

One problem with this is that the parts of the SWIF east of Puget Sound do not show the velocity contrasts that would indicate contrasting rock types. Another problem with the SWIF/RMFZ as CRBF is that a large westward step is required to connect from the RMFZ to the Saint Helens Zone (SHZ; see map), whereas the RMFZ turns easterly to align with the OWL. This last problem is partly solved because there is a locus of seismicity, and presumably faulting, extending from the northern end of the SHZ to the northern end of the Western Rainier Zone (see Fig. 48), along the edge of a formation known as the Southern Washington Cascades Conductor.

However, gravity and other data suggest that near the southern tip of Whidbey Island the Crescent Formation contact may turn away from the SWIF, and may even be reentrant under north Seattle, forming the northwestern side of the Seattle Basin, and possibly connecting with the recently reported "Bremerton trend" of faulting running from the southern end of Hood Canal, through Sinclair Inlet (Bremerton), and across Puget Sound. Or the Crescent margin may simply (and quietly) just run south-southeast under Seattle to the WRZ. Other seismic tomography has tantalizingly suggested three north-striking strands under Seattle, and a fourth just east of Lake Washington. Although there is no direct evidence for any major north-striking faults under Seattle, this prospect appears to be endorsed by the geological community.

How the CRBF might run north of Seattle (specifically, north of the OWL, which Seattle straddles) is unknown, and even questioned, as there is no direct evidence of such a fault. There is an intriguing view from Stanley, Villaseñor & Benz (1999) (see Fig. 64, on-line) that the edge of the Crescent Formation offsets west along the Seattle Fault, with the Seattle Basin resulting from a gap between the main part of Siletiza and a northern block that has broken away.

== Seattle Fault ==
The Seattle Fault is a zone of complex thrust and reverse faults – between lines E and F on the map – up to 7 km wide and over 70 km long that delineates the north edge of the Seattle Uplift. It stands out in regard of its east–west orientation, depth to bedrock, and hazard to an urban population center.

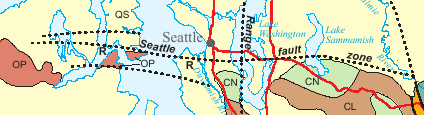
Approximate location of the Seattle Fault, showing eastern junction with SWIF and RMFZ. Western extension uncertain past Blue Hills uplift (marked "OP"). (Excerpt from DGER Geological Map GM-52.)

The Seattle Fault was first identified in 1965 but not documented as an active fault until 1992 with a set of five articles establishing that about 1100 years ago (AD 900–930) an earthquake of magnitude 7+ uplifted Restoration Point and Alki Point, dropped West Point (the three white triangles in the Seattle Basin on the map), caused rockslides in the Olympics, landslides into Lake Washington, and a tsunami on Puget Sound. It extends as far east as (and probably terminates at) the Rattlesnake Mountain Fault Zone (RMFZ; the southern extension of the SWIF) near Fall City. This seems geologically reasonable, as both the SWIF and RMFZ appear to be the contact between Tertiary Crescent Formation basement of Puget Sound on the west and the older Mesozoic (pre-Tertiary) mélange belt basement rocks under the Cascades on the east.

=== Structure ===
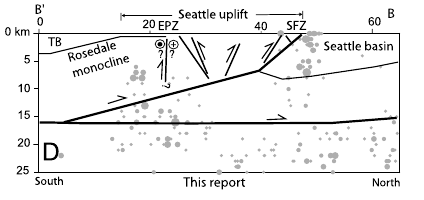
Cross-section of one model of the Seattle uplift. Models differ on the nature of the ramp and details of the faults. (From Johnson et al. 2004a, figure 17D.)

The Seattle Fault is the most studied of the regional faults, which has led to several models of its structure, which may also be relevant to other faults. In the wedge model of Pratt et al. (1997) a slab of rock – mainly basalts of the Crescent Formation – about 20 km thick is being pushed up a "master ramp" of deeper material; this forms the Seattle Uplift. The Seattle fault zone is where the forward edge of the slab, coming to the top of the ramp, breaks and slips into the Seattle Basin. In this model the Tacoma fault zone is primarily the result of local adjustments as the slab bends upward at the bottom of the ramp.

The passive roof duplex model of Brocher et al. (2001), relying on seismic tomography data from the "Seismic Hazards Investigation in Puget Sound" (SHIPS) experiment, retains the thrusting slab and master ramp concepts, but interprets the Tacoma fault as a reverse fault (or back thrust) that dips north towards the south dipping Seattle fault (see diagram); as a result the Seattle Uplift is being popped up like a horst.

While these models vary in some details, both indicate that the Seattle Fault itself is capable of a magnitude 7.5 earthquake. But if the Seattle Fault should break in conjunction with other faults (discussed above), considerably more energy would be released, on the order of ~M 8.

=== Question of western termination ===
Determination of the western terminus of the Seattle Fault has been problematic, and has implications for the entire west side of the Puget Lowland. Initially it was not specified, and rather vaguely indicated to be west of Restoration Point (i.e., west of Puget Sound). An early view was that "the Seattle Fault appears to be truncated by the Hood Canal fault ... and does not extend into the Olympic Mountains". This seems reasonable enough, as Hood Canal is a prominent physiographic boundary between the Olympic Mountains and Puget Lowlands, and believed to be the location of a major fault. Subsequent authors were confident enough to trace the fault west of Bremerton to just north of Green Mountain (the northwestern corner of the Blue Hills uplift – see "E" on the map – a topographically prominent exposure of uplifted basalt) and just short of Hood Canal; but reluctant to map the fault further west as the distinctive aeromagnetic lineament used to locate the Seattle Fault dies out just west of Bremerton.

Studies of the Seattle Fault west of Bremerton have revealed a complexity of geological structure and faulting. Several studies show that the southernmost strand of the SF, once past Green Mountain, turns southwest, towards the Saddle Mountain and Frigid Creek faults. However, the Saddle Mountain fault zone is not quite reciprocally aligned, trending more northerly to where it encounters west–east trending faults (including the Hamma Hamma fault zone) that appear to be a westward extension of the Seattle Fault zone. This trend extends further north where the Pleasant Harbor lineament appears to terminate other westward extensions of the SFZ. Other studies have faults extending NW or WNW from the SF towards Dabob Bay; these are now recognized as part of the Dabob Bay fault zone. While some coherency is developing, the story is not complete: identified faults do not yet account for much of the region's seismicity.

An emerging view is that the Dewatto fault marks the western edge of the relatively rigid Seattle Uplift (see map). Accommodation of strain (displacement) between the Seattle Fault and the Saddle Mountain deformation zone is likely distributed across the more pliable sediments of the Dewatto Basin; this, and the greater depth to the Crescent Formation, may account for the subdued expression of the Seattle Fault west of Green Mountain.

- USGS QFFDB Fault #570, Seattle Fault

== Tacoma Fault Zone ==
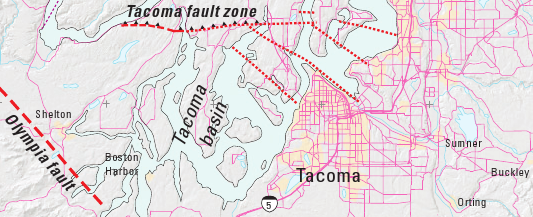
Tacoma fault zone, with multiple southeast-striking strands, and part of the Olympia fault.(USGS)

The Tacoma Fault (at right, and also between lines C and D on the Uplift and basin map, above) just north of the city of Tacoma, Washington has been described as "one of the most striking geophysical anomalies in the Puget Lowland". The western part is an active east–west striking north dipping reverse fault that separates the Seattle Uplift and the Tacoma Basin, with approximately 30 miles (50 km) of identified surface rupture. It is believed capable of generating earthquakes of at least magnitude 7, and there is evidence of such a quake approximately 1,000 years ago, possibly the same earthquake documented on the Seattle Fault 24 miles (38 km) to the north. This is likely not coincidental, as it appears that the Tacoma and Seattle faults converge at depth (see diagram above) in a way that north–south compression tends to force the Seattle Uplift up, resulting in dip-slip movement on both fault zones.

The Tacoma Fault was first identified by Gower, Yount & Crosson (1985) as a gravitational anomaly ("structure K") running east across the northern tip of Case and Carr Inlets, then southeast under Commencement Bay and towards the town of Puyallup. Not until 2001 was it identified as a fault zone, and only in 2004 did trenching reveal Holocene activity.

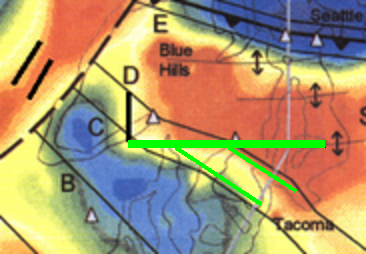
Excerpt from Bouguer gravity anomaly map (above), showing approximate locations of the Seattle Fault zone (line E), Seattle Uplift (red, and adjoining yellow border), parts of the Tacoma Fault Zone (green; the pair of green lines mark the Rosedale Monocline), Tacoma Basin (light blue), Dewatto Basin (northwestern portion of Tacoma Basin at C), Dewatto lineament/fault (vertical black bar at D), city of Belfair at white triangle.

Scarps associated with Holocene uplift of the Tacoma fault have been traced westward to Prickett Lake (southwest of Belfair, see map). The Tacoma fault was initially suspected of following a weak magnetic anomaly west to the Frigid Creek fault, but is now believed to connect with a steep gravitational, aeromagnetic, and seismic velocity gradient that strikes north towards Green Mountain (Blue Hills uplift). This is the Dewatto lineament, believed to result from an east-dipping low-angle thrust fault where the western flank of the Seattle Uplift has been pushed into the northwestern corner of the Tacoma Basin. It appears that the Seattle Uplift is acting as a rigid block, with the Tacoma, Dewatto, and Seattle faults being the southern, western, and northern faces. This may explain why the Seattle and Tacoma faults seem to have ruptured at nearly the same time.

Interpretation of the eastern part of the Tacoma Fault is not entirely settled. Most authors align it with the strong gravitational anomaly (which typically reflects where faulting has juxtaposed rock of different density) and topographical lineament down Commencement Bay. This follows the front of the Rosedale monocline, a gently southwest-tilting formation that forms the bluffs on which Tacoma is built.

On the other hand, the contrasting character of the east-striking and southeast-striking segments is unsettling, and the change of direction somewhat difficult to reconcile with the observed fault traces. Especially as seismic reflection data shows some faulting continuing east across Vashon Island and the East Passage of Puget Sound (the East Passage Zone, EPZ) towards Federal Way and an east-striking anticline. Whether the faulting continues eastward is not yet determined. The EPZ is active, being the locale of the 1995 M 5 Point Robinson earthquake.

There is evidence that the Tacoma Fault connects with the White River River Fault (WRF) via the EPZ and Federal Way, under the Muckleshoot Basin (see map), and thence to the Naches River Fault. If so, this would be a major fault system (over 185 km long), connecting the Puget Lowland with the Yakima Fold Belt on the other side of the Cascades, with possible implications for both the Olympic—Wallowa Lineament (which it parallels) and geological structure south of the OWL.

- USGS QFFDB Fault #581, Tacoma Fault

== Dewatto Lineament ==
The western flank of the Seattle Uplift forms a strong gravitational, aeromagnetic, and seismic velocity gradient known as the Dewatto lineament. It arises from the contrast between the denser and more magnetic basalt of the Crescent Formation that has been uplifted to the east, and the glacial sediments that have filled the Dewatto basin to the west. The Dewatto linement extends from the western end of the Tacoma fault (see map immediately above) northward towards Green Mountain at the western end of the Seattle fault.

Kinematic analysis suggests that if shortening (compression) in the Puget Lowland is directed to the northeast (i.e., parallel to Hood Canal and the Saddle Mountain deformation zone) and thus oblique to the Dewatto lineament, it should be subject to both strike-slip and dip-slip forces, implying a fault. Recent geophysical modeling suggests that the Dewatto lineament is the expression of a blind (concealed), low-angle, east-dipping thrust fault, named the Dewatto fault. (Originally named the Tahuya Fault.) This reflects westward thrusting of the Seattle Uplift into the Dewatto basin, a northwestern extension of the Tacoma basin. This interpretation suggests that the Seattle Uplift acts as a rigid block, and possibly explains the kinematic linkage by which large earthquakes may involve ruptures on multiple faults: the Seattle, Dewatto, and Tacoma faults represent the northern, western, and southern faces of a single block. Such interconnection also suggests a capability for larger earthquakes (> M 7 for the Seattle Fault); the amount of increased risk is unknown.

== Hood Canal Fault ==
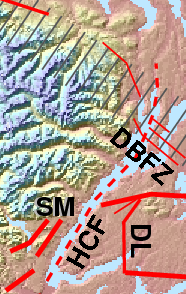
Excerpt from main map showing the putative Hood Canal Fault (dashed line) running up Hood Canal and Dabob Bay, the Dabob Bay Fault Zone (DBFZ), Saddle Mountain faults (SM), and western end of the Seattle Fault zone (approximate).

Hood Canal marks an abrupt change of physiography between the Puget Lowland and the Olympic Mountains to the west. Based on this and geophysical anomalies it was inferred that there is a major, active strike-slip fault zone running from the south end of Hood Canal, up Dabob Bay, and continuing north on land. This is conformable with some regional tectonic interpretations that put a major terrane boundary between the Olympics and the Puget Lowland, and imply a connection (either via the Discovery Bay Fault, or closer to Port Townsend) to the various faults in the Strait of Juan de Fuca. This boundary would be the contact where northward movement of the basement rock of the Puget Lowland against the Olympic Peninsula is accommodated; it would be expected to be a significant seismological zone.

However, the Hood Canal fault has been "largely inferred" due to a paucity of evidence, including lack of definite scarps and any other signs of active seismicity. A 2001 study using high-resolution seismic tomography questioned its existence. Though a 2012 study interpreted a different variety of tomographic data as showing the Hood Canal fault, other mapping has "found no convincing evidence for the existence of this fault", considers it doubtful, depicted it "with low level of confidence", or omits it entirely. For these reasons this is now a questioned fault, and is indicated on the map as a dashed line.

A new view is developing that the regional tectonic boundary is not under Hood Canal, but just to the west, involving the Saddle Mountain fault zone (discussed below) and associated faults. This is supported by geologically recent scarps and other signs of active faulting on the Saddle Mountain faults, and also discovery of a geophysical lineament running through Pleasant Harbor (south of Brinnon) that appears to truncate strands of the Seattle Fault. In this view Hood Canal is only a syncline (dip) between the Olympic Mountains and the Puget Lowland, and such faults as have been found there are local and discontinuous, ancillary to the main zone of faulting to the west. North of the Seattle Fault accommodation of regional movement may be along the northwest-striking Dabob Bay Fault Zone.

- USGS QFFDB Fault #552, Hood Canal Fault

== Saddle Mountain Faults ==
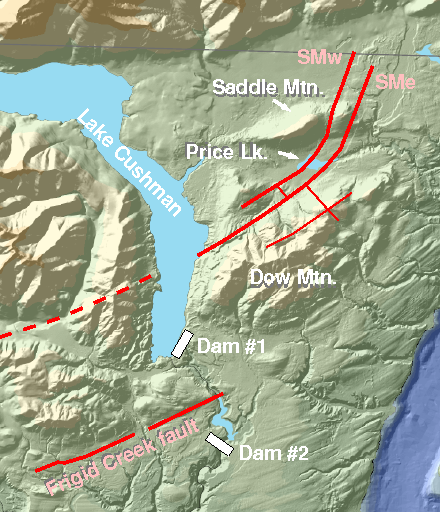
In red: Saddle Mountain faults (west and east) extension to the southwest inferred from aeromagnetic and LIDAR evidence, Dow Mountain fault (offset by SM east), and Frigid Creek fault.

The Saddle Mountain Faults ("East" and "West", and not to be confused with a different Saddle Mountains Fault in Adams county, eastern Washington), are a set of northeast trending reverse faults on the south-east flank of the Olympic Mountains near Lake Cushman first described in 1973 and 1975. Vertical movement on these faults has created prominent scarps that have dammed Price Lake and (just north of Saddle Mountain) Lilliwaup Swamp. The mapped surface traces are only 5 km long, but LIDAR-derived imagery shows longer lineaments, with the traces cutting Holocene alluvial traces. A recent (2009) analysis of aeromagnetic data suggests that it extends at least 35 km, from the latitude of the Seattle Fault (the Hamma Hamma River) to about 6 km south of Lake Cushman. Other faults to the south and southeast – the Frigid Creek Fault and (to the west) Canyon River Fault – suggest an extended zone of faulting at least 45 km long. Although the southwest striking Canyon River Fault is not seen to directly connect with the Saddle Mountain faults, they are in general alignment, and both occur in a similar context of Miocene faulting (where Crescent Formation strata has been uplifted by the Olympics) and a linear aeromagnetic anomaly. The Canyon River Fault is a major fault in itself, associated with a 40 km long lineament and distinct late Holocene scarps of up to 3 meters.

Although these faults are west of the Hood Canal Fault (previously presumed to be the western boundary of the Puget Lowland), new studies are revealing that the Saddle Mountain and related faults connect with the Seattle fault zone. Trench studies indicate major earthquakes (in the range of M 6. to 7.8) on the Saddle Mountain faults at nearly the same time (give or take a century) as the great quake on the Seattle Fault about 1100 years ago (900–930 AD). Such quakes pose a serious threat to the City of Tacoma's dams at Lake Cushman, located in the fault zone, and to everyone downstream on the Skokomish River. The Canyon River Fault is believed to have caused a similar-sized earthquake less than 2,000 years ago; this is a particular hazard to the Wynoochee Dam (to the west). The history and capabilities of the Frigid Creek Fault are not known.

- USGS QFFDB Fault #575, Saddle Mountain Faults

== Olympia Structure ==
The Olympia structure – also known as the Legislature fault – is an 80 km long gravitational and aeromagnetic anomaly that separates the sedimentary deposits of the Tacoma Basin from the basalt of the Black Hills Uplift (between lines A and B on the map). It is not known to be seismic – indeed, there is very little seismicity south of the Tacoma Basin as far as Chehalis – and not even conclusively established to be a fault.

This structure is shown in the gravitational mapping of 1965, but without comment. Gower, Yount & Crosson (1985), labelling it "structure L", mapped it from Shelton (near the Olympic foothills) southeast to Olympia (pretty nearly right under the state Legislature), directly under the town of Rainier, to a point due east of the Doty Fault, and apparently marking the northeastern limit of a band of southeast striking faults in the Centralia-Chehalis area. They interpreted it as "simple folds in Eocene bedrock", though Sherrod (1998) saw sufficient similarity with the Seattle Fault to speculate that this is a thrust fault. Pratt et al. (1997), while observing the "remarkable straight boundaries that we interpret as evidence of structural control", refrained from calling this structure a fault. (Their model of the Black Hills Uplift is analogous with their "wedge" model of the Seattle Uplift, discussed above, but in the opposite direction. If entirely analogous, then "roof duplex" might also apply, and the Olympia Fault would be a reverse fault similar to the Tacoma Fault.)

Aeromagnetic mapping in 1999 showed a very prominent anomaly (such as typically indicates a contrast of rock type); that, along with paleoseismological evidence of a major Holocene earthquake, has led to a suggestion that this structure "may be associated with faulting". One reason for caution is that a detailed gravity survey was unable to resolve whether the Olympia structure is, or is not, a fault. Although no surface traces of faulting have been found in either the Holocene glacial sediments or the basalts of the Black Hills, on the basis of well-drilling logs a fault has been mapped striking southeast from Offut Lake (just west of Rainier); it appears to be in line with the easternmost fault mapped in the Centralia—Chehalis area.

A marine seismic reflection study found evidence of faulting at the mouth of Budd Inlet, just north of the Olympia structure, and aligning with faint lineaments seen in the lidar imagery. These faults are not quite aligned with the Olympia structure, striking N75W (285°) rather than N45W (315°). It is uncertain how these faults relate to the structure, and whether they are deep-seated faults, or fractures due to bending of the shallow crust.

It has been speculated that the OS might connect with the seismically active Saint Helens Zone (discussed below), which would imply that the OS is both locked and being stressed, raising the possibility of a major earthquake. Alternately, the OS appears to coincide with a gravitational boundary in the upper crust that has been mapped striking southeast to The Dalles on the Columbia River, where there is a swarm of similarly striking faults.

That Olympia and the south Sound are at risk of major earthquakes is shown by evidence of subsidence at several locations in southern Puget Sound some 1100 years ago. What is unknown is whether this was due to a great subduction earthquake, to the noted earthquake on the Seattle Fault about that time, or to an earthquake on a local fault (e.g., the Olympia structure); there is some evidence that there were two earthquakes over a short time period. Subsidence dated to between AD 1445 and 1655 has been reported in Mud Bay (just west of Olympia).

(Not included in QFFDB.)

== Doty Fault ==
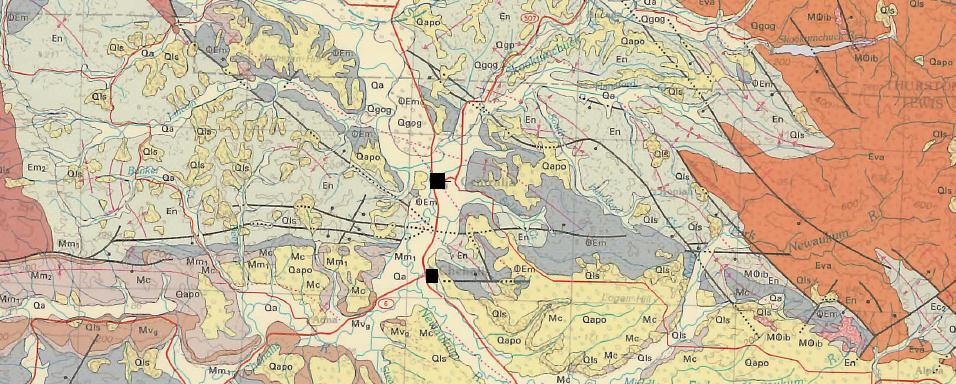
Excerpt from Geologic Map GM-34, showing faults in the Centralia—Chehalis Coal District, Lewis County, Washington. Doty—Salzer Creek Fault runs east–west between Centralia and Chehalis (black squares). Map available on-line. Click on image for enlargement.

The Doty Fault – the southernmost of the uplift-and-basin dividing faults reviewed here, and located just north of the Chehalis Basin – is one of nearly a dozen faults mapped in the Centralia—Chehalis coal district in 1958. While the towns of Centralia and Chehalis in rural Lewis County may seem distant (about 25 miles) from Puget Sound, this is still part of the Puget Lowland, and these faults, the local geology, and the underlying tectonic basement seem to be connected with that immediately adjacent to Puget Sound. And though the faults in this area are not notably seismogenic, the southeast striking faults seem to be en echelon with the Olympia structure (fault?), and headed for the definitely active Saint Helens Zone; this appears to be a large-scale structure. The Doty fault particularly seems to have gained prominence with geologists since it was associated with an aeromagnetic anomaly, and a report in 2000 credited it capable of a magnitude 6.7 to 7.2 earthquake. The prospect of a major earthquake on the Doty Fault poses a serious hazard to the entire Puget Sound region as it threatens vital economic lifelines: At Chehalis there is but a single freeway (Interstate 5) and a single rail line connecting the Puget Sound region with the rest of the west coast; the only alternate routes are very lengthy.

The Doty fault has been mapped from the north side of the Chehalis airport due west to the old logging town of Doty (due north of Pe Ell), paralleled most of that distance by its twin, the Salzer Creek Fault, about half a mile to the north. Both of these are dip-slip (vertical) faults; the block between them has been popped up by compressive forces. The Doty Fault appears to terminate against, or possibly merge with, the Salzer Creek Fault at Chehalis; the Salzer Creek Fault is traced another seven miles east of Chehalis. The length of the Doty Fault is problematical: the report in 2000 gave it as 65 km (40 miles), but without comment or citation. Such a length would be comparable to the length of the Seattle or Tacoma faults, and capable of an earthquake of M 6.7. But it does not appear that there have been studies of the deeper structure of these faults, or whether there has been any recent activity.

The Doty—Salzer Creek Fault does not fully fit the regional pattern of basins and uplifts bounded by faults described above. It does bound the north side of the Chehalis basin, but the south boundary of the Black Hills Uplift is more properly the southeast striking Scammon Creek Fault that converges with the Doty—Salzer Creek Fault just north of Chehalis. In the acute angle between these is located the minor Lincoln Creek uplift, the Doty Hills, and an impressive chunk of uplifted Crescent basalt (reddish area at west edge of the map). The SE striking Scammon Creek Fault seems to be terminated by the Salzer Creek Fault (the exact relationship is not clear), with the latter continuing east for another seven miles. Yet the former is only the first of at least six more parallel southeast striking faults, which do cross the Salzer Creek Fault. These faults are: the Kopiah Fault (note the curious curve), Newaukum Fault, Coal Creek Fault, and three other unnamed faults. Just past them is the parallel Olympia Structure, which as a geophysical lineament has been traced to a point due east of Chehalis; these would seem to be related somehow, but the nature of that relationship is not yet known.

Though these faults have been traced for only a little ways, the southeast striking anticlines they are associated with continue as far as Riffe Lake, near Mossyrock. They are also on-strike with a swarm of faults on the Columbia River, bracketing The Dalles. As all of these are thrust and reverse faults, they probably result from northeast directed regional compression. These faults also cross the Saint Helens Zone (SHZ), a deep, north-northwest trending zone of seismicity that appears to be the contact between different crustal blocks. How they might be connected is unknown.

What makes the Doty—Salzer Fault (and the short Chehalis Fault striking due east from Chehalis) stand out from the many other faults south of Tacoma is its east–west strike; the significance of this is not known.

(Not included in QFFDB. See Snavely et al. 1958 and Geologic Map GM-34 for details.)

== Saint Helens Zone, Western Rainier Zone ==
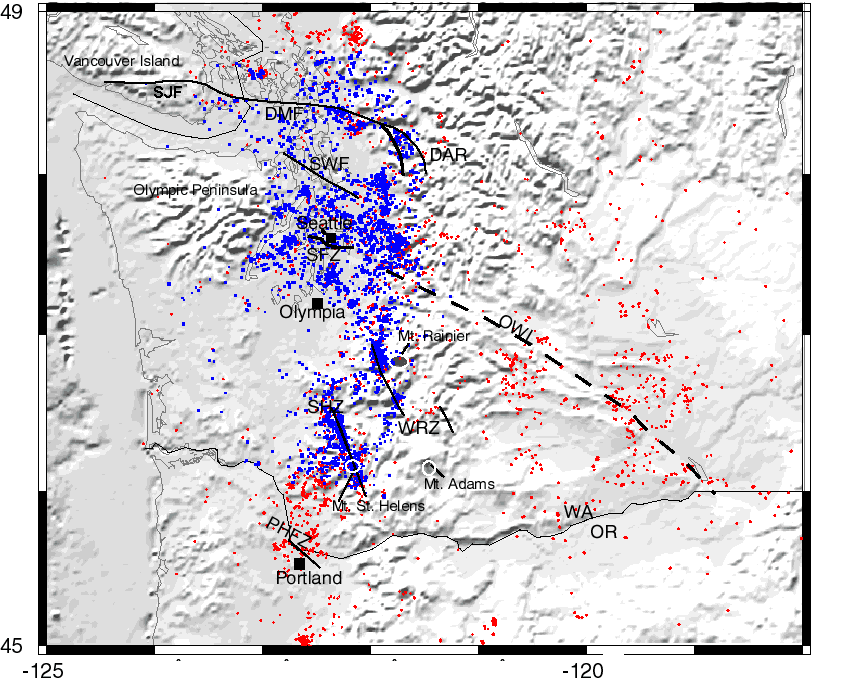
Mid-crustal (10–20 km deep) seismicity in western Washington. (Fig. 48 from USGS OFR 99-311)

The most striking concentrations of mid-crustal seismicity in western Washington outside of Puget Sound are the Saint Helens Zone (SHZ) and Western Rainier Zone (WRZ) at the southern edge of the Puget Lowland (see seismicity map, right). Indeed, it is mainly by their seismicity that these faults are known and have been located, neither showing any surface faulting. The SHZ and WRZ lie just outside the topographical basin that constitutes the Puget Lowland (see image), do not participate in the uplift and basin pattern, and unlike the rest of the faults in the Puget Lowland (which are reverse or thrust faults reflecting mostly compressive forces) they appear to be strike-slip faults; they reflect a geological context distinctly different from the rest of the Puget Lowland. In particular, to the southeast of Mount St. Helens and Mount Rainier they reflect a regional pattern of NNW oriented faulting, including the Entiat Fault in the North Cascades and the Portland Hills and related faults around Portland (see QFFDB fault map). Yet the SHZ and WRZ may be integral to the regional geology of Puget Sound, possibly revealing some deep and significant facets, and may also present significant seismic hazard.

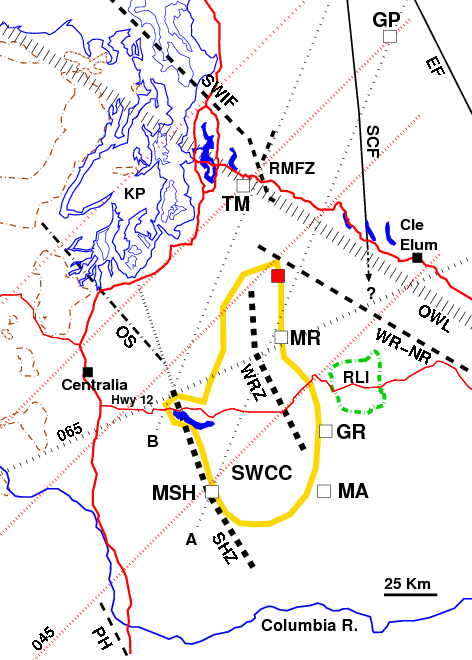
The Southern Washington Cascades Conductor (SWCC, yellow) located at depth approximately between Mount St. Helens (MSH), Mount Adams (MA), Goat Rocks (GR), Mount Rainier (MR), and Riffe Lake, with a lobe extending towards Tiger Mountain (TM). Also shown: Entiat Fault, Straight Creek Fault (inactive, southern continuation unknown), Southern Whidbey Island Fault, Rattlesnake Mountain Fault Zone, Olympic–Wallowa Lineament, White River/Naches River fault, Rimrock Lake Inlier (outlined in green), surface outcrops of the Crescent Formation (outlined in brown), Olympia Structure, Portland Hills fault zone.

The WRZ and SHZ are associated with the southern Washington Cascades conductor (SWCC), a formation of enhanced electrical conductivity lying roughly between Riffe Lake and Mounts St. Helens, Adams, and Rainier, with a lobe extending north (outlined in yellow, right). This formation, up to 15 km thick, is largely buried (from one to ten kilometers deep), and known mainly by magnetotellurics and other geophysical methods. The southwestern boundary of the SWCC, where it is believed to be in near vertical contact with the Eocene basalts of the Crescent Formation, forms a good part of the 90 km (56 mile) long SHZ. On the eastern side, where the SWCC is believed to be in contact with pre-Tertiary terranes accreted to the North American craton, matters are different. While there is a short zone (not shown) of fainter seismicity near Goat Rocks (an old Pliocene volcano) that may be associated with the contact, the substantially stronger seismicity of the WRZ is associated with the major Carbon River—Skate Mountain anticline. This anticline, or uplifted fold, and the narrower width of the northern part of the SWCC, reflects an episode of compression of this formation. Of great interest here is that both the northern lobe of the SWCC and the Carbon River anticline are aligned towards Tiger Mountain (an uplifted block of the Puget Group of sedimentary and volcanic deposits typical of the Puget Lowland) and the adjacent Raging River anticline (see map). The lowest exposed strata of Tiger Mountain, the mid-Eocene marine sediments of the Raging River formation, may be correlative with the SWCC.

Does the SHZ extend north? Though the Olympia Structure (a suspected fault) runs towards the SHZ, and delineates the northern edge of an exposed section of the Crescent Formation, it appears to be an upper crustal fold, part of a pattern of folding that extends southeast to cross the Columbia River near The Dalles, and unrelated to the mid and lower crustal SHZ. It has been speculated that the SHZ might extend under the Kitsap Peninsula (central Puget Sound), possibly involved with a section of the subducting Juan de Fuca plate that is suspected of being stuck. The implications of this are not only "the possibility of a moderate to large crustal earthquake along the SHZ", but that the tectonics under Puget Sound are more complicated than yet understood, and may involve differences in the regional stress patterns not reflected in current earthquake hazard assessments.

== Deeper structure ==
Mount St. Helens and Mount Rainier are located where their associated fault zones make a bend (see map, above).(Mt. Rainier is offset because the faults are deep and the conduits do not rise quite vertically.) These bends are located where they intercept a "subtle geological structure" of "possible fundamental importance", a NNE striking zone (line "A" on the map) of various faults (including the Tokul Creek Fault NNE of Snoqualmie) and early-Miocene (about 24 Ma) volcanic vents and intrusive bodies (plutons and batholiths) extending from Portland to Glacier Peak; it also marks the change in regional fault orientation noted above. This MSH-MR-GP lineament is believed to reflect a "long-lived deep-seated lithospheric flaw that has exerted major control on transfer of magma to the upper crust of southern Washington for approximately the last 25 [million years]"; it has been attributed to the geometry of the subducting Juan de Fuca plate.

A parallel line ("B") about 15 miles (25 kilometers) to the west corresponds to the western limit of a zone of seismicity stretching from the WRZ to southwest of Portland. Curiously, the extension of line "B" north of the OWL is approximately the eastern limit of Puget Sound seismicity, the rest of southwestern Washington and the North Cascades being relatively aseismic (see the seismicity map, above). This line may also mark the northwestern boundary of the SWCC. North of the RMFZ it follows a topographical lineament that can be traced to Rockport (on Hwy. 20); it includes the Cherry Creek Fault Zone NNE of Carnation, location of the 1965 Duvall earthquake. Between the Cherry Creek and parallel Tokul Creek faults is a contact between formations of the Western Melange Belt. The zone between these two lines, reflecting changes in regional structure, seismicity, fault orientation, and possibly the underlying lithospheric structure, appears to be a major structural boundary in the Puget Lowland.

Also intersecting at Mount St. Helens is a NE (045°) trending line (red) of Pleistocene (about 4 Ma) plug domes and a topographic lineament (followed in part by Highway 12). This line is the southernmost of a band of NE trending faults and topographical lineaments that extend from the Oregon coast into the North Cascades. A similar line aligns with the termination of the WRZ, SHZ, and Gales Creek Fault Zone (northwest of Portland), with faulting along the upper Nehalem River on the Oregon coast, and a topographical contrast at the coast (between Neahkahnie Mountain and the lower Nehalem River valley) distinct enough to be seen on the seismicity map above (due west of Portland). Other similar lineaments (such as from Astoria to Glacier Peak) align with various topographical features and changes in fault orientation. These lineaments have been associated with possible zones of faulting in the crust and subducting plate.

These features suggest that the southern Puget Lowland is influenced by the deep crust and even the subducting Juan de Fuca plate, but the details and implications are not yet known.

== Other faults ==
=== Actual ===
There are numerous other faults (or fault zones) in the Puget Lowland, and around its edges, sketchily studied and largely unnamed. These are usually fairly short, and not believed to be significantly seismogenic. However, most seismic activity is not associated with any known fault. Seismicity sometimes occurs in zones, such as has been observed under Mercer Island, or from downtown Seattle towards Kirkland but whether particular zones reflect undiscovered faults, or might be the source of damaging earthquakes, is generally unknown. Ongoing mapping is revealing more faults. E.g., mapping along the Rattlesnake Mountain Fault Zone has revealed a complex network of active or potentially active faults across (and likely beyond) the lower Snoqualmie Valley, including the Cherry Creek Fault Zone, scene of the 1996 M 5.3 Duvall earthquake. The San Juan Island and Leach River faults crossing the southern end of Vancouver Island are significant and undoubtedly connected with the Darrington—Devils Mountain and Southern Whidbey Island faults, and certainly of particular interest to the residents of Victoria, B.C. But their significance to the Puget Sound area is unknown.

The Little River Fault (see the QFFDB, Fault 556) is representative of an extensive zone of faults along the north side of the Olympic Peninsula and in the Strait of Juan de Fuca (likely connected with the fault systems at the south end of Vancouver Island, see fault database map), but these lie west of the crustal blocks that underlie the Puget Lowland, and again their possible impact on the Puget Sound region is unknown. One of these faults, the Sequim Fault Zone (striking east from the town of Sequim), crosses Discovery Bay (and various possible extensions of the Hood Canal Fault) and bounds the Port Ludlow Uplift ("uplift of unknown origin" on the map); it appears to extend to the Southern Whidbey Island Fault.

An Everett Fault, running east-northeast along the bluffs between Mukilteo and Everett – that is, east of the SWIF and at the southern edge of the Everett Basin – has been claimed, but this does not appear to have been corroborated.

A Lofall Fault has been reported on the basis of marine seismic reflection surveying, but has not been confirmed by trenching. This fault seems to be associated with the Kingston arch anticline, and part of the uplift and basin pattern, but shortened because of the geometry of the SWIF. It is not notably seismogenic.

Although the largely unstudied White River Fault (WRF) appears to lie just outside the Puget Lowland, it may actually connect under the Muckleshoot Basin to the East Passage Zone and the Tacoma Fault (map). This would pose significantly greater seismic hazard than currently recognized, especially as the White River Fault is believed to connect with the Naches River Fault that extends along Highway 410 on the east side of the Cascades towards Yakima.

The Straight Creek Fault is a major structure in the North Cascades, but has not been active for over 30 million years. Various other faults in the North Cascades are older (being offset by the Straight Creek Fault) and are unrelated to the faults in Puget Sound.

=== Conjectured ===
A Puget Sound Fault running down the center of Puget Sound (and Vashon Island) was once proposed, but seems to have not been accepted by the geological community. A Coast Range Boundary Fault (CRBF, discussed above) was inferred on the basis of differences in the basement rock to the west and east of Puget Sound (the Crescent Formation—Cascadia core contact), and arbitrarily mapped at various locations including Lake Washington; north of the OWL this is now generally identified, with the Southern Whidbey Island Fault. Where it might run south of Seattle is not known; an argument has been made that it runs beneath Seattle but this is still conjectural.

Study of surface deformation suggests possible unmapped faults near Federal Way, running between Sumner and Steilacoom, and south of Renton.

== See also ==
- Geology of the Pacific Northwest

== Sources ==
- Adams, J. (4 December 1992), "Paleoseismology: A Search for Ancient Earthquakes in Puget Sound", Science, 258 (5088): 1592–1593, Bibcode:1992Sci...258.1592A, doi:10.1126/science.258.5088.1592, PMID 17742523.
- Anderson, M. L.; Blakely, R. J.; Wells, R. E.; Dragovich, J. (2011). "Eastern boundary of the Siletz terrane in the Puget Lowland from gravity and magnetic modeling with implications for seismic hazard analysis [abstract GP33B-06]". American Geophysical Union, Fall Meeting 2011. Bibcode:2011AGUFMGP33B..06A..
- Anderson, M. L.; Dragovich, J. D.; Blakely, R. J.; Wells, R.; Brocher, T. M. (2008). "Where Does the Seattle Fault End? Structural Links and Kinematic Implications [Abstract T23B-2022]". American Geophysical Union, Fall Meeting 2008. Bibcode:2008AGUFM.T23B2022A..
- Babcock, R. S.; Burmester, R. F.; Engebretsen, D. C.; Warnock, A. (10 May 1992), "A Rifted Margin Origin for the Crescent Basalts and Related Rocks in the Northern Coast Range Volcanic Province, Washington and British Columbia", Journal of Geophysical Research, 97 (B5): 6799–6821, Bibcode:1992JGR....97.6799B, doi:10.1029/91JB02926.
- Ballantyne, D.; Pierepiekarz, M.; Chang, S. (2002), Seismic Vulnerability Assessment of the Seattle—Tacoma Highway Corridor using HAZUS.
- Barnett, E. A.; Haugerud, R. A.; Sherrod, B. L.; Weaver, C. S.; Pratt, T. L.; Blakely, R. J. (2010), "Preliminary atlas of active shallow tectonic deformation in the Puget Lowland, Washington", U.S. Geological Survey, Open-File Report 2010-1149, 32 p., 14 maps.
- Blakely, R. J.; Jachens, R. C. (10 November 1990), "Volcanism, Isostatic Residual Gravity, and Regional Tectonic Setting of the Cascade Volcanic Province", Journal of Geophysical Research, 95 (B12): 19439–19451, Bibcode:1990JGR....9519439B, doi:10.1029/JB095iB12p19439.
- Blakely, R. J.; Sherrod, B. L. (March 2006), "Findings on the southern Whidbey Island fault zone from aeromagnetic anomalies, lidar surveys, and trenching" (PDF), U.S. Geological Survey, Presentation at USGS NSHMP (National Seismic Hazard Maps) Pacific Northwest Workshop March 28–29, 2006.
- Blakely, R. J.; Sherrod, B. L.; Hughes, J. F.; Anderson, M. L.; Wells, R. E.; Weaver, C. S. (April 2009a), "The Saddle Mountain Fault Deformation Zone, Olympic Peninsula, Washington: Western Boundary of the Seattle Uplift" (PDF), Geosphere, 5 (2): 105–125, Bibcode:2009Geosp...5..105B, doi:10.1130/GES00196.1
- Blakely, R. J.; Sherrod, B. L.; Weaver, C. S.; Wells, R. E. (2009b), "Connecting Crustal Faults and Tectonics from Puget Sound across the Cascade Range to the Yakima Fold and Thrust Belt, Washington: Evidence from New High-Resolution Aeromagnetic Data [Abstract GP232-02]", Eos, Transactions, American Geophysical Union, 90 (20).
- Blakely, R. J.; Sherrod, B. L.; Weaver, C. S.; Wells, R. E.; Rohay, A. C.; Barnett, E. A.; Knepprath, N. E. (7 July 2011), "Connecting the Yakima fold and thrust belt to active faults in the Puget Lowland, Washington", Journal of Geophysical Research, 116 (B7): B07105, Bibcode:2011JGRB..116.7105B, doi:10.1029/2010JB008091.
- Blakely, R. J.; Sherrod, B. L.; Wells, R. E.; Weaver, C. S.; McCormack, D. H.; Troost, K. G.; Haugerud, R. A. (2004), "The Cottage Lake Aeromagnetic Lineament: A possible onshore extension of the Southern Whidbey Island Fault, Washington" (PDF), U.S. Geological Survey, Open-File Report 2004-1204.
- Blakely, R. J.; Wells, R. E.; Weaver, C. S. (1999), "Puget Sound Aeromagnetic Maps and Data", U.S. Geological Survey, Open-File Report 99-514.
- Blakely, R. J.; Wells, R. E.; Weaver, C. S.; Johnson, S. Y. (February 2002), "Location, structure, and seismicity of the Seattle fault zone, Washington: Evidence from aeromagnetic anomalies, geologic mapping, and seismic-reflection data" (PDF), Geological Society of America Bulletin, 114 (2): 169–177, Bibcode:2002GSAB..114..169B, doi:10.1130/0016-7606(2002)114<0169:LSASOT>2.0.CO;2.
- Brandon, M. T.; Calderwood, A. R. (December 1990), "High-pressure metamporphism and uplift of the Olympic subduction complex", Geology, 18 (12): 1252–1255, Bibcode:1990Geo....18.1252B, doi:10.1130/0091-7613(1990)018<1252:HPMAUO>2.3.CO;2.
- Brocher, T. M.; Blakely, R. J.; Wells, R. E. (August 2004), "Interpretation of the Seattle Uplift, Washington, as a Passive-Roof Duplex" (PDF), Bulletin of the Seismological Society of America, 94 (4): 1379–1401, Bibcode:2004BuSSA..94.1379B, doi:10.1785/012003190.
- Brocher, T. M.; Parsons, T.; Blakely, R. J.; Christensen, N. I.; Fisher, M. A.; Wells, R. E.; et al. (SHIPS Working Group) (10 July 2001), "Upper crustal structure in Puget Lowland, Washington: Results from the 1998 Seismic Hazards Investigation in Puget Sound", Journal of Geophysical Research, 106 (B7): 13541–13564, Bibcode:2001JGR...10613541B, doi:10.1029/2001JB000154.
- Brown, E. H.; Dragovich, J. D. (December 2003), "Tectonic elements and evolution of northwest Washington", Washington Division of Geology and Earth Resources, Geological Map GM–52, 1 sheet, scale 1:625,000, with 12 p. text.
- Bucknam, R. C.; Hemphill-Haley, E.; Leopold, E. B. (4 December 1992), "Abrupt Uplift Within the Past 1700 Years at Southern Puget Sound, Washington", Science, 258: 1611–1614, Bibcode:1992Sci...258.1611B, doi:10.1126/science.258.5088.1611, PMID 17742525, S2CID 39423769.
- Calvert, A. J.; Fisher, M. A.; et al. (SHIPS working group) (15 June 2001), "Imaging the Seattle Fault Zone with high-resolution seismic tomography", Geophysical Research Letters, 28 (12): 2337–2340, Bibcode:2001GeoRL..28.2337C, doi:10.1029/2000GL012778.
- Carley, S.; Liberty, L. M.; Pratt, T. L. (2007). "Geophysical characterization of the Muckleshoot Basin, northwestern Washington State [Abstract T51C-0694]". American Geophysical Union, Fall Meeting 2007. Bibcode:2007AGUFM.T51C0694C..
- Carson, R. J. (July 1973), "First known active fault in Washington" (PDF), Washington Geological Newsletter, 1 (3): 1–3.
- Carson, R. J.; Wilson, J. R. (October 1974), "Quaternary faulting on Dow Mountain, Mason County" (PDF), Washington Geological Newsletter, 2 (4): 1.
- Cheney, E. S. (1987), "Major Cenozoic faults in the northern Puget Lowland of Washington" (PDF), in Schuster, J. E. (ed.), Selected papers on the Geology of Washington, Washington DGER Bulletin, vol. 77, pp. 149–168.
- Clement, C. R. (2004), Seismic reflection imaging across steep gravity and magnetic anomaly gradients in southern Puget Sound, WA: Future fault or benign block? [abstract].
- Clement, C. R.; Pratt, T. R.; Holmes, M. A.; Sherrod, B. L. (August 2010), "High-Resolution Seismic Reflection Imaging of Growth Folding and Shallow Faults beneath the Southern Puget Lowland, Washington State", Bulletin of the Seismological Society of America, 100 (4): 1710–1723, Bibcode:2010BuSSA.100.1710C, doi:10.1785/0120080306.
- Clowes, R. M.; Brandon, M. T.; Green, A. G.; Yorath, C. J.; Brown, A. S.; Kanasewich, E. R.; Spencer, C. (January 1987), "LITHOPROBE— southern Vancouver Island: Cenozoic subduction complex imaged by deep seismic reflections" (PDF), Canadian Journal of Earth Sciences, 24 (1): 31–51, Bibcode:1987CaJES..24...31C, doi:10.1139/e87-004.
- Contreras, T. A.; Legorreta Paulin, G.; Czajkowski, J. L.; Polenz, M.; Logan, R. L.; Carson, R. J.; Mahan, S. A.; Walsh, T. J.; Johnson, C. N.; Skov, R. H. (June 2010), "Geologic map of the Lilliwaup 7.5-minute quadrangle, Mason County, Washington", Washington Division of Geology and Earth Resources, Open File Report 2010-4, 1 sheet, scale 1:24,000 13 p. text.
- Contreras, T. A.; Weeks, S. A.; Stanton, K. M. D.; Stanton, B. W.; Perry, B. B.; Walsh, T. J.; Carson, R. J.; Clark, K. P.; Mahan, S. A. (August 2012a), "Geologic map of the Holly 7.5-minute quadrangle, Jefferson, Kitsap, and Mason Counties, Washington", Washington Division of Geology and Earth Resources, Open File Report 2011-5, 1 sheet, scale 1:24,000, 13 p. text.
- Contreras, T. A.; Spangler, E.; Fusso, L. A.; Reioux, D. A.; Legorreta Paulin, G.; Pringle, P. T.; Carson, R. J.; Lindstrum, E. F.; Clark, K. P.; Tepper, J. H.; Pileggi, D.; Mahan, S. A. (December 2012b), "Geologic map of the Eldon 7.5-minute quadrangle, Jefferson, Kitsap, and Mason Counties, Washington", Washington Division of Geology and Earth Resources, Map Series 2012-03, 1 sheet, scale 1:24,000, with 60 p. text.
- Daneš, Z. F.; Bonno, M. M.; Brau, E.; Gilham, W. D.; Hoffman, T. T.; Johansen, D.; Jones, M. H.; Malfait, B.; Masten, J.; Teague, G. O. (15 November 1965), "Geophysical Investigation of the Southern Puget Sound Area, Washington" (PDF), Journal of Geophysical Research, 70 (22): 5573–5580, Bibcode:1965JGR....70.5573D, doi:10.1029/JZ070i022p05573, archived from the original (PDF) on 16 January 2017.
- Dragovich, J. D.; Norman, D. K.; Grisamer, C. L.; Logan, R. L.; Anderson, G. (September 1998), "Geologic Map and Interpreted Geologic History of the Bow and Alger 7.5-minute Quadrangles, Western Skagit County, Washington", Washington Division of Geology and Earth Resources, Open-File Report 98-5, 1 sheet, scale 1:24,000, 80 p. text.
- Dragovich, J. D.; Logan, R. L.; Schasse, H. W.; Walsh, T. J.; Lingley, W. S.; Norman, D. K.; Gerstel, W. J.; Lapen, T. J.; Schuster, J. E.; Meyers, K. D. (2002), "Geologic Map of Washington – Northwest Quadrant" (PDF), Washington Division of Geology and Earth Resources, Geologic Map GM-50, 3 sheets, scale 1:250,000, 72 p. text.
- Dragovich, J. D.; Petro, G. T.; Thorsen, G. W.; Larson, S. L.; Foster, G. R.; Norman, D. K. (June 2005), "Geologic map of the Oak Harbor, Crescent Harbor, and part of the Smith Island 7.5-minute quadrangles, Island County", Washington Division of Geology and Earth Resources, Geological Map GM–59, 2 sheets, scale 1:24,000.
- Dragovich, J. D.; DeOme, A. J. (June 2006), "Geologic map of the McMurray 7.5-minute Quadrangle, Skagit and Snohomish Counties, Washington, with a Discussion of the Evidence for Holocene Activity on the Darrington–Devils Mountain Fault Zone", Washington Division of Geology and Earth Resources, Geological Map GM–61, 1 sheet, scale 1:24,000, 18 p. text.
- Dragovich, J. D.; Anderson, M. L.; Walsh, T. J.; Johnson, B. L.; Adams, T. L. (November 2007), "Geologic map of the Fall City 7.5-minute quadrangle, King County, Washington", Washington Division of Geology and Earth Resources, Geological Map GM–67, 1 sheet, scale 1:24,000, 16 p. text.
- Dragovich, J. D.; Walsh, T. J.; Anderson, M. L.; Hartog, R.; DuFrane, S. A.; Vervoot, J.; Williams, S. A.; Cakir, R.; Stanton, K. D.; Wolff, F. E.; Norman, D. K.; Czajkowski, J. L. (February 2009), "Geologic map of the North Bend 7.5-minute quadrangle, King County, Washington, with a discussion of major faults, folds, and basins in the map area", Washington Division of Geology and Earth Resources, Geological Map GM–73, 1 sheet, scale 1:24,000, 39 p. text.
- Dragovich, J. D.; Littke, H. A.; Anderson, M. L.; Hartog, R.; Wessel, G. R.; DuFrane, S. A.; Walsh, T. J.; MacDonald, J. H.; Mangano, J. F.; Cakir, R. (July 2009), "Geologic Map of the Snoqualmie 7.5-Minute Quadrangle, King County, Washington", Washington Division of Geology and Earth Resources, Geological Map GM–75, 2 sheets, scale 1:24,000, with text.
- Dragovich, J. D.; Littke, H. A.; Anderson, M. L.; Wessel, G. R.; Koger, C. J.; Saltonstall, J. H.; MacDonald, J. H. Jr.; Mahan, S. A.; DuFrane, S. A. (June 2010a), "Geologic map of the Carnation 7.5-minute quadrangle, King County, Washington", Washington Division of Geology and Earth Resources, Open-File Report 2010-1, 1 sheet, scale 1:24,000, with 21 p. text.
- Dragovich, J. D.; Anderson, M. L.; MacDonald, J. H. Jr.; Mahan, S. A; DuFrane, S. A.; Littke, H. A.; Wessel, G. R.; Saltonstall, J. H.; Koger, C. J.; Cakir (June 2010b), "Supplement to the geologic map of the Carnation 7.5-minute quadrangle, King County, Washington – Geochronologic, geochemical, point count, geophysical, earthquake, fault, and neotectonic data", Washington Division of Geology and Earth Resources, Open File Report 2010-2, 42 pages, 8 digital appendices.
- Dragovich, J. D.; Anderson, M. L.; Mahan, S. A.; Koger, C. J.; Saltonstall, J. H.; MacDonald, J. H.; Wessel, G. R.; Stoker, B. A.; Bethel, J. P.; Labadie, J. E.; Cakir, Recep; Bowman, J. D.; DuFrane, S. A. (November 2011), "Geologic map of the Monroe 7.5-minute quadrangle, King County, Washington", Washington Division of Geology and Earth Resources, Open-File Report 2011-1, 1 sheet, scale 1:24,000, with 24 p. text.
- Dragovich, J. D.; Anderson, M. L.; Mahan, S. A.; MacDonald, J. H.; McCabe, C. P.; Cakir, Recep; Stoker, B. A.; Villeneuve, N. M.; Smith, D. T.; Bethel, J. P. (October 2012), "Geologic map of the Lake Joy 7.5-minute quadrangle, King County, Washington", Washington Division of Geology and Earth Resources, Map Series 2012-01, 2 sheets, scale 1:24,000 70 p. text.
- Dragovich, Joe D.; Littke, Heather A.; Mahan, Shannon A.; Anderson, Megan L.; MacDonald, James H. Jr.; Cakir, Recep; Stoker, Bruce A.; Koger, Curtis J.; DuFrane, S. Andrew; Bethel, John P.; Smith, Daniel T.; Villeneuve, Nathan M. (October 2013), "Geologic map of the Sultan 7.5-minute quadrangle, Snohomish and King Counties, Washington", Washington Division of Geology and Earth Resources, Map Series 2013-01, 1 sheet, scale 1:24,000, 52 p. text.
- Dragovich, J. D.; Frattali, C. L.; Anderson, M. L.; Mahan, S. A.; MacDonald Jr., J. H.; Stoker, B. A.; Smith, D. T.; Koger, C. J.; Cakir, R.; DuFrane, A.; Sauer, K. B. (December 2014), "Geologic Map of the Lake Chaplain 7.5-minute Quadrangle, Snohomish County, Washington", Washington Division of Geology and Earth Resources, Map Series 2014–01, 1 sheet, scale 1:24,000, 51 p. text.
- Dragovich, J. D.; Mahan, S. A.; Anderson, M. L.; MacDonald, J. H. Jr; Schilter, J. F.; Frattali, C. L.; Koger, C. J.; Smith, D. T.; Stoker, B. A.; DuFrane, Andrew; Eddy, M. P.; Cakir, Recep; Sauer, K. B. (October 2015), "Geologic map of the Lake Roesiger 7.5-minute quadrangle, Snohomish County, Washington", Washington Division of Geology and Earth Resources, Map Series 2015-01, 1 sheet, scale 1:24,000, 47 p. text.
- Dragovich, J. D.; Mavor, S. P.; Anderson, M. L.; Mahan, S. A.; MacDonald, J. H. Jr.; Tepper, J. H.; Smith, D. T.; Stoker, B. A.; Koger, C. J.; Cakir, R.; DuFrane, A.; Scott, S. P.; Justman, B. J. (November 2016), "Geologic Map of the Granite Falls 7.5-minute Quadrangle, Snohomish County, Washington", Washington Division of Geology and Earth Resources, Map Series 2016–03, 1 sheet, scale 1:24,000, 63 p. text.
- Egbert, G. D.; Booker, J. R. (10 September 1993), "Imaging Crustal Structure in Southwestern Washington With Small Magnetometer Arrays" (PDF), Journal of Geophysical Research, 98 (B9): 15967–15985, Bibcode:1993JGR....9815967E, doi:10.1029/93JB00778, S2CID 128620802.
- Evarts, R. C.; Ashley, R. P.; Smith, J. G. (10 September 1987), "Geology of the Mount St. Helens Area: Record of Discontinuous Volcanic and Plutonic Activity in the Cascade Arc of Southern Washington", Journal of Geophysical Research, 82 (B10): 10155–10169, Bibcode:1987JGR....9210155E, doi:10.1029/JB092iB10p10155.
- Finn, C. (10 November 1990), "Geophysical constraints on Washington convergent margin structure", Journal of Geophysical Research, 95 (B12): 19553–19546, Bibcode:1990JGR....9519533F, doi:10.1029/JB095iB12p19533.
- Finn, C. (April 1999), "Aeromagnetic map compilation: procedures for merging and an example from Washington", Annali di Geofisica, 42 (2): 327–331.
- Finn, C.; Stanley, W. D. (June 1997), "Something old, something new, something borrowed, something blue – a new perspective on seismic hazards in Washington using aeromagnetic data" (PDF), Washington Geology, 25 (2): 3–7.
- Finnegan, N. J.; Pritchard, M. E.; Lohman, R. B.; Lundgren, P. R. (2008), "Constraints on surface deformation in the Seattle, WA, urban corridor from satellite radar interferometry time-series analysis" (PDF), Geophysical Journal International, 174 (1): 29–41, Bibcode:2008GeoJI.174...29F, doi:10.1111/j.1365-246X.2008.03822.x, archived from the original (PDF) on 6 June 2013.
- Fisher, M. A.; Hyndman, R. D.; Johnson, S. Y.; Brocher, T. M.; Crosson, R. S.; wells, R. A.; Calvert, A. J.; ten Brink, U. S. (2005), "Crustal Structure and Earthquake Hazards of the Subduction Zone in Southwestern British Columbia and Western Washington" (PDF), U. S. Geological Survey, Professional Paper 1661-C.
- Frizzell, V. A.; Tabor, R. W.; Zartman, R. E.; Blome, C. D. (1987), "Late Mesozoic or Early Tertiary Melanges in the Western Cascades of Washington" (PDF), in Schuster, J. E. (ed.), Selected papers on the Geology of Washington, Washington DGER Bulletin, vol. 77, pp. 129–148.
- Gower, H. D. (1980), "Bedrock geologic and Quaternary tectonic map of the Port Townsend area, Washington", U.S. Geological Survey, Open-File Report 80-1174, 1 sheet, scale 1:100,000, with 19 p. text.
- Gower, H. D.; Yount, J. C.; Crosson, R. S. (1985), "Seismotectonic map of the Puget Sound region, Washington", U. S. Geological Survey, Miscellaneous Investigations Map I-1613, 1 sheet, scale 1:250,000, 15 p. text.
- Guffanti, M.; Weaver, C. S. (10 June 1988), "Distribution of late Cenozoic volcanic vents in the Cascade Range: Volcanic arc segmentation and regional tectonic considerations", Journal of Geophysical Research, 93 (B6): 6513–6529, Bibcode:1988JGR....93.6513G, doi:10.1029/JB093iB06p06513.
- Haeussler, P. J.; Clark, K. M. (2000), "Geologic map of the Wildcat Lake 7.5' quadrangle, Kitsap and Mason Counties, Washington" (PDF), U. S. Geological Survey, Open File Report 00-356, 1 sheet, scale 1:24,000.
- Harding, D. J.; Berghoff, G. S. (2000), "Fault scarp detection beneath dense vegetation cover: airborne LIDAR mapping of the Seattle Fault Zone, Bainbridge Island, Washington State" (PDF), Proceedings of the American Society of Photogrammetry and Remote Sensing Annual Conference, Washington, D.C., May, 2000.
- Haug, B. J. (1998), High Resolution Seismic Reflection Interpretations of the Hood Canal-Discovery Bay Fault Zone, Puget Sound, Washington (Master's Thesis), Portland State University.
- Haugerud, R. A.; Harding, D. J.; Johnson, S. Y.; Harless, J. L.; Weaver, C. S.; Sherrod, B. L. (June 2003), "High-Resolution Lidar Topography of the Puget Lowland, Washington – A Bonanza for Earth Science", GSA Today, 13 (6): 4–10, Bibcode:2003GSAT...13f...4H, doi:10.1130/1052-5173(2003)13<0004:HLTOTP>2.0.CO;2.
- Hayward, N.; Nedimović, M. R.; Cleary, M.; Calvert, A. J. (2006), "Structural variation along the Devil's Mountain fault zone, northwestern Washington" (PDF), Canadian Journal of Earth Sciences, 43 (4): 433–466, Bibcode:2006CaJES..43..433H, doi:10.1139/E06-002.
- Hughes, J. M.; Stoiber, R. E.; Carr, M. J. (January 1980), "Segmentation of the Cascade volcanic chain", Geology, 8 (1): 15–17, Bibcode:1980Geo.....8...15H, doi:10.1130/0091-7613(1980)8<15:SOTCVC>2.0.CO;2.
- Johnson, S. Y. (1984), "Stratigraphy, age, and paleogeography of the Eocene Chuckanut Formation, northwest Washington", Canadian Journal of Earth Sciences, 21 (1): 92–106, Bibcode:1984CaJES..21...92J, doi:10.1139/e84-010.
- Johnson, S. Y.; Blakely, R. J.; Brocher, T. M. (2003), "Fault number 573, Utsalady Point Fault", in U.S. Geological Survey (ed.), Open-File Report, p. 59, Bibcode:2003usgs.rept...59M, doi:10.3133/ofr03417.
- Johnson, S. Y.; Blakely, R. J.; Brocher, T. M.; Bucknam, R. C.; Haeussler, P. J.; Pratt, T. L.; Nelson, A. R.; Sherrod, B. L.; Wells, R.E.; Lidke, D.J.; Harding, D.J.; Kelsey, H.M. (2004), "Fault number 570, Seattle Fault", in U.S. Geological Survey (ed.), Quaternary fault and fold database of the United States, p. 1, Bibcode:2004usgs.data....1H.
- Johnson, S. Y.; Blakely, R. J.; Brocher, T. M.; Sherrod, B. L.; Lidke, D. J.; Kelsey, H. M. (2004), "Fault number 572, Southern Whidbey Island Fault", in U.S. Geological Survey (ed.), Quaternary fault and fold database of the United States, p. 1, Bibcode:2004usgs.data....1H.
- Johnson, S. Y.; Blakely, R. J.; Stephenson, W. J.; Dadisman, S. V.; Fisher, M. A. (2004a), "Active shortening of the Cascadia forearc and implications for seismic hazards of the Puget Lowland" (PDF), Tectonics, 23 (TC1011): 1–27, Bibcode:2004Tecto..23.1011J, doi:10.1029/2003TC001507.
- Johnson, S. Y.; Dadisman, S. V.; Childs, J. R.; Stanley, W. D. (July 1999), "Active tectonics of the Seattle fault and central Puget Sound, Washington – Implications for earthquake hazards", Geological Society of America Bulletin, 111 (7): 1042–1053, Bibcode:1999GSAB..111.1042J, doi:10.1130/0016-7606(1999)111<1042:ATOTSF>2.3.CO;2.
- Johnson, S. Y.; Nelson, A. R.; Personius, S. F.; Wells, R. E.; Kelsey, H. M.; Sherrod, B. L.; Okumura, K.; Koehler, R.; Witter, R. C.; Bradley, L.; Harding, D. J. (December 2004b), "Evidence for Late Holocene Earthquakes on the Utsalady Point Fault, Northern Puget Lowland, Washington" (PDF), Bulletin of the Seismological Society of America, 94 (6): 2299–2316, Bibcode:2004BuSSA..94.2299J, doi:10.1785/0120040050.
- Johnson, S. Y.; Potter, C. J.; Armentrout, J. M. (January 1994), "Origin and evolution of the Seattle Fault and Seattle Basin, Washington", Geology, 22 (1): 71–74, Bibcode:1994Geo....22...71J, doi:10.1130/0091-7613(1994)022<0071:OAEOTS>2.3.CO;2.
- Johnson, S. Y.; Potter, C. J.; Armentrout, J. M.; Miller, J. J.; Finn, C. A.; Weaver, C. S. (March 1996), "The southern Whidbey Island fault – An active structure in the Puget Lowland, Washington" (PDF), Geological Society of America Bulletin, 108 (3): 334–354, Bibcode:1996GSAB..108..334J, doi:10.1130/0016-7606(1996)108<0334:TSWIFA>2.3.CO;2.
- Karel, P.; Liberty, L. M. (2008). "The western extension of the Seattle fault: new insights from seismic reflection data [abstract #T21B-1951]". American Geophysical Union, Fall Meeting 2008. Bibcode:2008AGUFM.T21B1951K..
- Karlin, R. E.; Abella, S. E. B. (10 March 1996), "A history of Pacific Northwest earthquakes recorded in Holocene sediments from Lake Washington", Journal of Geophysical Research, 110 (B3): 6137–6150, Bibcode:1996JGR...101.6137K, doi:10.1029/95JB01626.
- Kelsey, H. M.; Sherrod, B. L. (2001), "Late Holocene displacement on the Southern Whidbey Island fault zone, northern Puget lowland" (PDF), U.S. Geological Survey, NEHRP, Program Award 00HQGR0067.
- Kelsey, H. M.; Sherrod, B. L.; Nelson, A. R.; Brocher, T. M. (November–December 2008), "Earthquakes generated from bedding plane-parallel reverse faults above an active wedge thrust, Seattle fault zone.", Geological Society of America Bulletin, 120 (11/12): 1581–1597, Bibcode:2008GSAB..120.1581K, doi:10.1130/B26282.1.
- Lamb, A. P.; Liberty, L. M.; Blakely, R. J.; Van Wijk, K. (2009a), "The Tahuya Lineament: Southwestern Extension of the Seattle Fault? [Paper No. 182-3]", Geological Society of America 2009 Annual Meeting, Abstracts with Programs, 41 (7): 479.
- Lamb, A. P.; Liberty, L. M.; Blakely, R. J.; Pratt, T. L.; Sherrod, B. L.; Van Wijik, K. (26 June 2012), "Western limits of the Seattle fault zone and its interaction with the Olympic Peninsula, Washington" (PDF), Geosphere, 8 (4): 915–930, Bibcode:2012Geosp...8..915L, doi:10.1130/GES00780.1.
- Liberty, L. M. (2007), "Seismic reflection imaging across the eastern portions of the Tacoma fault zone" (PDF), U.S. Geological Survey, NEHRP, Project Award Number 07HQGR0088.
- Liberty, L. M. (2009), "The western extension of the Seattle fault: new insights from seismic reflection data" (PDF), U.S. Geological Survey, NEHRP, Project Award Number 08HQGR0075, Bibcode:2008AGUFM.T21B1951K.
- Liberty, L. M.; Pape, K. M. (2008), "Seismic Characterization of the Seattle and Southern Whidbey Island Fault Zones in the Snoqualmie River Valley, Washington" (PDF), U.S. Geological Survey, NEHRP, Project Award Number 06HQGR0111.
- Lidke, D. J. (2003), "Fault number 552, Hood Canal fault zone", in U.S. Geological Survey (ed.), Open-File Report, p. 59, Bibcode:2003usgs.rept...59M, doi:10.3133/ofr03417.
- Logan, R. L.; Schuster, R. L.; Pringle, P. T.; Walsh, T. J.; Palmer, S. P. (September 1998), "Radiocarbon Ages of Probable Coseismic Features from the Olympic Peninsula and Lake Sammamish, Washington" (PDF), Washington Geology, 26 (2–3): 59–67.
- Logan, R. L.; Walsh, T. J. (June 2004), "Geologic map of the Summit Lake 7.5-minute quadrangle, Thurston and Mason Counties, Washington" (PDF), Washington Division of Geology and Earth Resources, Open-File Report 2004-10, 1 sheet, scale 1:24,000.
- Mace, C. G.; Keranen, K. M. (March 2012), "Oblique fault systems crossing the Seattle Basin: Geophysical evidence for additional shallow fault systems in the central Puget Lowland", Journal of Geophysical Research, 117 (B3): B03105, Bibcode:2012JGRB..117.3105M, doi:10.1029/2011JB008722.
- Magsino, S.; Sanger, E.; Walsh, T. J.; Palmer, S. P.; Blakely, R. J. (November 2003), "The Olympia structure; ramp or discontinuity? New gravity data provide information [abstract]", Geological Society of America 2003 Annual Meeting, Abstracts with Programs, 35 (6): 479.
- McCaffrey, R.; Qamar, A. I.; King, R. W.; Wells, R.; Khazaradze, G.; Williams, C. A.; Stevens, C. W.; Vollick, J. J.; Zwick, P. C. (2007), "Fault locking, block rotation and crustal deformation in the Pacific Northwest" (PDF), Geophysical Journal International, 169 (3): 1315–1340, Bibcode:2007GeoJI.169.1315M, doi:10.1111/j.1365-246X.2007.03371.x.
- Mackin, J. H.; Cary, A. S. (1965), Origin of Cascade Landscapes (PDF), vol. Information Circular 41.
- Molinari, M. P.; Burk, R. L. (November 2003), "The Everett fault: a newly discovered late Quaternary fault in north-central Puget Sound, Washington [abstract]", Geological Society of America 2003 Annual Meeting, Abstracts with Programs, 35 (6): 479.
- Nelson, A. R.; Johnson, S. Y.; Kelsey, H. M.; Wells, R. E.; Sherrod, B. L.; Pezzopane, S. K.; Bradley, L.; Koehler, R. D.; Bucknam, R. C. (November 2003), "Late Holocene earthquakes on the Toe Jam Hill fault, Seattle fault zone, Bainbridge Island, Washington" (PDF), Geological Society of America Bulletin, 115 (11): 1368–1403, Bibcode:2003GSAB..115.1388N, doi:10.1130/B25262.1.
- Nelson, A. R.; Personius, S. F.; Sherrod, B. L.; Buck, J.; Bradley, L.; Henley II, G.; Liberty, L. M.; Kelsey, H. M.; Witter, R.C.; Koehler, R.D.; Schermer, E.R.; Nemser, E.S.; Cladouhos, T.T. (2008), "Field and laboratory data from an earthquake history study of scarps in the hanging wall of the Tacoma fault, Mason and Pierce Counties, Washington", U.S. Geological Survey, Scientific Investigations Map 3060, 3 sheets.
- Olbinski, J. S. (1983), Geology of the Buster Creek-Nehalem Valley Area, Clatsop County, Northwest Oregon (PDF) (Master's Thesis), Oregon State University.
- Parsons, T.; Wells, R. E.; Fisher, M. A.; Flueh, E.; ten Brink, U. S. (10 August 1999), "Three-dimensional velocity structure of Siletzia and other accreted terranes in the Cascadia forearc of Washington" (PDF), Journal of Geophysical Research, 104 (B8): 18015–18039, Bibcode:1999JGR...10418015P, doi:10.1029/1999jb900106.
- Polenz, M.; Czajkowski, J. L.; Legorreta Paulin, G.; Contreras, T. A.; Miller, B. A.; Martin, M. E.; Walsh, T. J.; Logan, R. L.; Carson, R. J.; Johnson, C. N.; Skov, R. H.; Mahan, S. A.; Cohan, C. R. (June 2010a), "Geologic map of the Skokomish Valley and Union 7.5-minute quadrangles, Mason County, Washington", Washington Division of Geology and Earth Resources, Open-File Report 2010-3, 1 sheet, scale 1:24,000 with 21 p. text.
- Polenz, M.; Contreras, T. A.; Czajkowski, J. L.; Legorreta Paulin, G.; Miller, B. A.; Martin, M. E.; Walsh, T. J.; Logan, R. L.; Carson, R. J.; Johnson, C. N.; Skov, R. H.; Mahan, S. A.; Cohan, C. R. (June 2010b), "Supplement to Geologic Maps of the Lilliwaup, Skokomish Valley, and Union 7.5-minute Quadrangles, Mason County, Washington— Geologic Setting and Development Around the Great Bend of Hood Canal" (PDF), Washington Division of Geology and Earth Resources, Open-File Report 2010-5, 27 p..
- Polenz, M.; Miller, B. A.; Davies, N.; Perry, B. B.; Clark, K. P.; Walsh, T. J.; Carson, R. J.; Hughes, J. F. (August 2012), "Geologic map of the Hoodsport 7.5-minute quadrangle, Mason County, Washington", Washington Division of Geology and Earth Resources, Open File Report 2011-3, 1 sheet, scale 1:24,000, 18 p. text.
- Polenz, M.; Spangler, E.; Fusso, L. A.; Reioux, D. A.; Cole, R. A.; Walsh, T. J.; Cakir, R.; Clark, K. P.; Tepper, J. H.; Carson, R. J.; Pileggi, D.; Mahan, S. A. (December 2012), "Geologic map of the Brinnon 7.5-minute quadrangle, Jefferson and Kitsap Counties, Washington", Washington Division of Geology and Earth Resources, Map Series 2012-02, 1 sheet, scale 1:24,000, with 47 p. text.
- Polenz, M.; Petro, G. T.; Contreras, T. A.; Stone, K. A.; Legorreta Paulin, G.; Cakir, R. (October 2013), "Geologic map of the Seabeck and Poulsbo 7.5-minute quadrangles, Kitsap and Jefferson Counties, Washington", Washington Division of Geology and Earth Resources, Map Series 2013-02, 1 sheet, scale 1:24,000, with 39 p. text.
- Pratt, T. L.; Johnson, S. Y.; Potter, C. J.; Stephenson, W. J. (10 December 1997), "Seismic reflection images beneath Puget Sound, western Washington State: The Puget Lowland thrust sheet hypothesis", Journal of Geophysical Research, 102 (B12): 27469–27490, Bibcode:1997JGR...10227469P, doi:10.1029/97JB01830.
- Ramachandran, K. (2001), Velocity Structure of S.W. British Columbia, and N.W. Washington, From 3-D Non-linear Seismic Tomography [dissertation] (PDF), University of Victoria.
- Ramachandran, K. (2012), "Constraining fault interpretation through tomographic velocity gradients: application to northern Cascadia", Solid Earth, 3 (1): 53–61, Bibcode:2012SolE....3...53R, doi:10.5194/se-3-53-2012.
- Rogers, G. C. (August 2002), "Phase changes, fluids and the co-location of the deep and shallow seismicity beneath Puget Sound and southern Georgia Strait", in Kirby, S.; Wang, K.; Dunlop, S. (eds.), The Cascadia Subduction Zone and Related Subduction Systems: Seismic Structure, Intraslab Earthquakes and Processes, and Earthquake Hazards (PDF), vol. Open-File Report 02-328, U.S. Geological Survey.
- Rogers, W. P. (1970), A geological and geophysical study of the central Puget Lowland [dissertation], Seattle: University of Washington, 123 p., 9 plates.
- Schuster, J. E. (2005), "Geologic map of Washington State", Washington Division of Geology and Earth Resources, Geological Map GM–53, 1 sheet, scale 1:500,000, 44 p. text.
- Sherrod, B. L. (1998), Late Holocene environments and earthquakes in southern Puget Sound [dissertation], University of Washington, Seattle.
- Sherrod, B. L. (2001), "Evidence for earthquake-induced subsidence ~1100 yr ago in coastal marshes of southern Puget Sound, Washington", Geological Society of America Bulletin, 113 (10): 1299–1311, Bibcode:2001GSAB..113.1299S, doi:10.1130/0016-7606(2001)113<1299:EFEISA>2.0.CO;2, S2CID 54000651.
- Sherrod, B. L.; Blakely, R. J.; Weaver, C. S.; Kelsey, H.; Barnett, E.; Wells, R. (2005), "Holocene fault scarps and shallow magnetic anomalies along the Southern Whidbey Island Fault Zone near Woodinville, Washington" (PDF), U.S. Geological Survey, Open-File Report 2005-1136: S51C–1022, Bibcode:2005AGUFM.S51C1022S.
- Sherrod, B. L.; Blakely, R. J.; Weaver, C. S.; Kelsey, H. M.; Barnett, E.; Liberty, L.; Meagher, K. L.; Pape, K. M. (May 2008), "Finding concealed active faults: Extending the southern Whidbey Island fault across the Puget Lowland, Washington" (PDF), Journal of Geophysical Research, 113 (B5): B05313, Bibcode:2008JGRB..113.5313S, doi:10.1029/2007JB005060.
- Sherrod, B. L.; Brocher, T. M.; Weaver, C. S.; Bucknam, R. C.; Blakely, R. J.; Kelsey, H. M.; Nelson, A. R.; Haugerud, R. (January 2004), "Holocene fault scarps near Tacoma, Washington, USA" (PDF), Geology, 32 (1): 9–12, Bibcode:2004Geo....32....9S, doi:10.1130/G19914.1.
- Sherrod, B. L.; Nelson, A. R.; Kelsey, H. M.; Brocher, T. M.; Blakely, R. J.; Weaver, C. S.; Rountree, N. K.; Rhea, B. S.; Jackson, B. S. (2003), "The Catfish Lake Scarp, Allyn, Washington: Preliminary Field Data and Implications for Earthquake Hazards posed by the Tacoma Fault", U.S. Geological Survey, Open-File Report 03-0455. The basis of Sherrod et al. 2004.
- Snavely, P. D.; Brown, R. D.; Roberts, A. E.; Rau, W. W. (1958), "Geology and Coal Resources of the Centralia—Chehalis District, Washington", U.S. Geological Survey, Bulletin 1053, 6 plates, 159 p. text.
- Snelson, C. M.; Brocher, T. M.; Miller, K. C.; Pratt, T. L.; Tréhu, A. M. (October 2007), "Seismic Amplification within the Seattle Basin, Washington State: Insights from SHIPS Seismic Tomography Experiments" (PDF), Bulletin of the Seismological Society of America, 97 (5): 1432–1448, Bibcode:2007BuSSA..97.1432S, doi:10.1785/0120050204.
- Stanley, W. D.; Finn, C.; Plesha, J. L. (10 September 1987), "Tectonics and Conductivity Structures in the Southern Washington Cascades", Journal of Geophysical Research, 92 (B10): 10179–10193, Bibcode:1987JGR....9210179S, doi:10.1029/JB092iB10p10179.
- Stanley, W. D.; Johnson, S. Y. (1993), "Analysis of Deep Seismic Reflection and Other Data From the Southern Washington Cascades" (PDF), Fuels Technology Contractors Review Meeting, Morgantown, West Virginia, November 16–18, 1993, U.S. Dept. of Energy.
- Stanley, W. D.; Johnson, S. Y.; Williams, J. M.; Weaver, C. S. (1993), Anticlinal Structures, Seismicity, and Strike-slip Faulting in the Southern Washington Cascades (PDF), U.S. Department of Energy, Contract No. DE-AT21-92MC29267 26 p., doi:10.2172/10105840, OSTI 10105840
- Stanley, W. D.; Johnson, S. Y.; Qamar, A. I.; Weaver, C. S.; Williams, J. M. (February 1996), "Tectonics and Seismicity of the Southern Washington Cascade Range" (PDF), Bulletin of the Seismological Society of America, 86 (1A): 1–18, Bibcode:1996BuSSA..86....1S, doi:10.1785/BSSA08601A0001.
- Stanley, D.; Villaseñor, A.; Benz, H. (1999), "Subduction zone and crustal dynamics of western Washington: A tectonic model for earthquake hazards evaluation", U.S. Geological Survey, Open-File Report 99-311.
- Tabor, R. W. (1994), "Late Mesozoic and possible early Tertiary accretion in western Washington State: the Helena-Haystack mélange and the Darrington-Devils Mountain Fault Zone", Geological Society of America Bulletin, 106 (2): 217–232, Bibcode:1994GSAB..106..217T, doi:10.1130/0016-7606(1994)106<0217:lmapet>2.3.co;2.
- Tabor, R. W.; Crowder, D. F. (1969), "On batholiths and volcanoes – Intrusion and eruption of Late Cenozoic magmas in the Glacier Peak area, north Cascades, Washington", U.S. Geological Survey, Professional Paper 604.
- Tabor, R. W.; Frizzell, V. A.; Booth, D. B.; Waitt, R. B. Jr. (2000), "Geologic map of the Snoqualmie Pass 60 minute by 30 minute quadrangle, Washington", U.S. Geological Survey, Miscellaneous Investigations Map 2538, 1 sheet with pamphlet, scale 1:100,000.
- ten Brink, U. S.; Molzer, P. C.; Fisher, M. A.; Blakely, R. J.; Bucknam, R. C.; Parsons, T.; Crosson, R. S.; Creager, K. C. (June 2002), "Subsurface Geometry and Evolution of the Seattle Fault Zone and the Seattle Basin, Washington" (PDF), Bulletin of the Seismological Society of America, 92 (5): 1737–1753, Bibcode:2002BuSSA..92.1737B, doi:10.1785/0120010229.
- ten Brink, U. S.; Song, J.; Bucknam, R. C. (July 2006), "Rupture models for the A.D. 900–930 Seattle fault earthquake from uplifted shorelines" (PDF), Bulletin of the Geological Society of America, 34 (7): 585–588, Bibcode:2006Geo....34..585T, doi:10.1130/G22173.1.
- Van Wagoner, T. M.; Crosson, R. S.; Creager, K. C.; Medema, G.; Preston, L. (10 December 2002), "Crustal structure and relocated earthquakes in the Puget Lowland, Washington, from high-resolution seismic tomography", Journal of Geophysical Research, 107 (B12): ESE 22-1–23, Bibcode:2002JGRB..107.2381V, doi:10.1029/2001JB000710.
- Vance, J. A.; Miller, R. B. (1994), "Another look at the Fraser River-Straight Creek Fault (FRSCF) [abstract]", Geological Society of America 1994 Annual Meeting, Abstracts with Programs, 24: 88.
- Vine, J. D. (1962), "Stratigraphy of Eocene rocks in a part of King County, Washington" (PDF), Report of Investigations No. 21, Washington State Division of Mines and Geology.
- Walsh, T. J.; Korosec, M. A.; Phillips, W. M.; Logan, R. L.; Schasse, H. W. (1987), "Geologic map of Washington – Southwest Quadrant" (PDF), Washington Division of Geology and Earth Resources, Geologic Map GM–34, 2 sheets, scale 1:250,000, 28 p. text.
- Walsh, T. J.; Logan, R. L. (June 2005), "Geologic Map of the East Olympia 7.5-minute Quadrangle, Thurston County, Washington" (PDF), Washington Division of Geology and Earth Resources, Geological Map GM–56, 1 sheet, scale 1:24,000, with text.
- Walsh, T. J.; Logan, R. L. (2007), "Field data for a trench on the Canyon River fault, southeast Olympic Mountains, Washington" (PDF), Washington Division of Geology and Earth Resources, Open File Report 2007-1, poster, with text.
- Weaver, C. S.; Grant, W. C.; Shemata, J. E. (10 September 1987), "Crustal Extension at Mount St. Helens, Washington", Journal of Geophysical Research, 92 (B10): 10170–10178, Bibcode:1987JGR....9210170W, doi:10.1029/JB092iB10p10170.
- Weaver, C. S.; Smith, S. W. (10 December 1983), "Regional Tectonic and Earthquake Hazard Implications of a Crustal Fault Zone in Southwestern Washington", Journal of Geophysical Research, 92 (B12): 10371–10383, Bibcode:1983JGR....8810371W, doi:10.1029/JB088iB12p10371.
- Witter, R. C.; Givler, R. W. (2005), "Final Technical Report: Two Post-Glavial Earthquakes on the Saddle Mountain West Fault, southeastern Olympic Peninsula, Washington" (PDF), U.S. Geological Survey, NEHRP, Program Award 05HQGR0089.
- Wong, I.; Silva, W.; Bott, J.; Wright, D.; Thomas, P.; Gregor, N.; Li, S.; Mabey, M.; Sojourner, A.; Wang, Y. (2000), "Earthquake scenario and probabilistic ground shaking maps for the Portland, Oregon, metropolitan area" (PDF), Oregon Department of Geology and Mineral Industries, Interpretive Map Series IMS-16.
- Yelin, T. S. (1982), The Seattle earthquake swarms and Puget Basin focal mechanisms and their tectonic implications (Master's Thesis), University of Washington.
- Yount, J. C.; Gower, H. D. (1991), "Bedrock Geologic Map of the Seattle 30' by 60' Quadrangle, Washington", U.S. Geological Survey, Open-File Report 91-147, 4 plates, with 37 p. text.
