= Snelson =

Snelson may refer to:

== Places ==
- Snelson, Cheshire, a former civil parish in Cheshire, England

== People ==
- Catherine Snelson, American geophysicist
- George Matthew Snelson (1837–1901), considered the founding father of Palmerston North, New Zealand
- Kenneth Snelson, sculptor
