= Catherine Snelson =

American geophysicist

Catherine Mary Snelson (also published as Cathy Snelson-Gerlicher) is an American geophysicist whose research has included the seismic imaging of the Earth's lithosphere and upper mantle, and the use of forensic seismology in monitoring underground nuclear weapons testing. She is a researcher at the Los Alamos National Laboratory.

== Education and career ==
Snelson majored in geology at California State University, East Bay, graduating in 1995. She continued her studies at the University of Texas at El Paso, where she received a master's degree in 1998 and completed her Ph.D. in 2001.

She was an assistant professor of geoscience at the University of Nevada, Las Vegas from 2002 to 2007, and an assistant professor of earth and environmental sciences at the New Mexico Institute of Mining and Technology from 2007 to 2010. In 2010 she began working for National Security Technologies LLC, a contractor for the Los Alamos National Laboratory, and in 2014 she joined the Los Alamos National Laboratory as a scientist. Since 2018 she has been a program manager in the Earth and Environmental Sciences Division at Los Alamos.

== Recognition ==
Snelson was a 2003 recipient of the Presidential Early Career Award for Scientists and Engineers. She was one of two recipients of the 2022 Los Alamos Global Security Medal, in recognition of her work on nuclear monitoring.
