= Hills in the Puget Lowland =

Hills in the Puget Lowland, between the Cascades and the Olympic Mountains, including the entire Seattle metropolitan area, are generally between 350–450 feet (110–140 m) and rarely more than 500 feet (150 m) above sea level. Hills are often notable geologically and for social reasons, such as the seven hills of Seattle.

== Formation ==
The Puget Lowland lies between the Cascades and Olympic Mountains and once contained a plateau of glacial till not usually more than 350–450 feet (110–140 m) above sea level. The plateau, "the most prominent single landform of the entire region", was dissected by glacial outwash, forming present-day landforms: rivers, creeks and streams; glacial lakes such as Lake Washington; and numerous kettle lakes, and Puget Sound itself. High points on the plateau remain, most of which are a drumlin (rocky glacial debris), or a bedrock intrusion that predated glaciation. Hills above 500 feet are considered exceptional. (Note: "The elevation is, with some local exceptions, less than 150 meters (500 feet) above sea level. Much of the landscape consists of rolling hills with a relief of only a few hundred feet.")

== Notable lowlands hills ==
Hills are glacial deposits unless otherwise noted. King, Pierce and Snohomish Counties run up to the crest of the Cascades where their high points reside; therefore, the Cascades and attached foothills are excluded. Likewise for Thurston County in the Mount Rainier area, and Mason County's Olympic Mountains foothills.

=== North Sound ===
Landforms north of the Tacoma Narrows (Island, King, Kitsap, Pierce and Snohomish counties)

==== Island County ====
Whidbey Island and Camano Island are islands in Puget Sound and form the bulk of Island County.

- Whidbey Island high point, 520–540 feet (160–160 m) unnamed peak 500 meters from Naval Air Station Whidbey Island
- Camano Island high point, 580 feet (180 m) unnamed peak, the lowest high point of any Washington county

==== King County ====
- Finn Hill, 440 feet (130 m) altitude
- Rose Hill; Forbes Creek origin, 535 feet (163 m), Kirkland's high point (also see Bridle Trails State Park)
- Novelty Hill, Redmond's high point at c. 585 feet (178 m)

Seattle

- High Point, West Seattle, the highest point in the city at 520 feet (160 m)
- Seven hills of Seattle
  - First Hill, nicknamed "Pill Hill" because of the many hospitals and clinics located there
  - Yesler Hill
  - Renton Hill
  - Denny Hill – regraded, now called the Denny Regrade
  - Capitol Hill
  - Queen Anne Hill
  - Beacon Hill

==== Kitsap County ====
The Blue Hills of the Kitsap Peninsula are unusual in that they are composed of basalt bedrock, not glacial till.

- Gold Mountain, 1,761 feet (537 m) (Kitsap County h.p. & city of Bremerton watershed on mountain contains city h.p.)
- Green Mountain, 1,639 feet (500 m)

Bainbridge Island is an island in Puget Sound.

- Toe Jam Hill, Bainbridge Island's high point, 425 feet (130 m)

==== Pierce County ====
- South Hill above Puyallup, 541 feet (165 m)
- Argonne Forest hills at Fort Lewis, formed of multiple layers of till deposited during Vashon glaciation; some hills may overlie drumlins from an earlier glacial phase. Hills are designated critical habitat for the Northern Spotted Owl, an endangered species whose forest habitat in the Puget Lowland has been largely destroyed.
  - Black Hill 502 ft.
  - Heaton Hill 423 ft.
  - Kelly Hill 458 ft.
  - Starr Hill 463–467 ft.

==== Snohomish County ====
- Bald Hill, 737 feet (225 m)
- Lake Serene Hill, Lynnwood 649 feet (198 m)
- Clearview Hill, 600 feet (180 m) altitude

=== South Puget Sound ===
Landforms in South Puget Sound (Thurston and Mason counties)

- Black Hills, southwest of Olympia, basalt bedrock, high point 2,664 feet (812 m). Bedrock comes to shore of Puget Sound at Mud Bay.
- Kamilche Hill 370 meters (1,210 ft), Mason County above Little Skookum Inlet

== Low mountains ==
The Issaquah Alps Bellevue, Issaquah and Newcastle on the Eastside are considered part of the Cascades foothills by many authors. (Note: "Westernmost encroachment of the Cascades into the lowland contains exposures of preglacial bedrock marked by a series of peaks ... including Tiger and Squak mountains") They are basalt intrusions possibly related to the Blue Hills of the Kitsap Peninsula. Highest point Tiger Mountain summit, 3,004 feet (916 m).

The Anacortes Community Forest Lands contain several peaks over 1,000 feet (300 m) high, including the Fidalgo Island high point, 1,273-foot (388 m) Mount Erie.

Mason County's Olympic Mountains foothills are called the Satsop Hills.

== See also ==
- List of highest points in Washington by county
- List of mountain peaks of Washington (state)
