= List of mountains and hills of Kitsap County, Washington =

This is a list of mountains and hills of Kitsap County, Washington by elevation.

The county's highest peaks are in the Blue Hills, in the Wildcat Lake or Bremerton West USGS quadrangle. Inclusion is defined here as within 2 miles of Green Mountain or Gold Mountain, as the boundaries are not strictly defined by authorities.

Rank	Name	Range	Elevation (ft)	Prominence (ft)	Parent (proximate)	Isolation (mi)	Coordinates	Notes
1	Gold Mountain	Blue Hills	1761	1531	Olympic Mountains foothills Green Hill, Jefferson County	13.24		Kitsap County high point
2	Green Mountain	Blue Hills	1710	860	Gold Mountain	1.35		
3	Kitsap Lookout	Blue Hills	1370	600	Gold Mountain	1.92		Unnamed at Lists of John, named at Peakbagger. Abandoned fire lookout located at summit.
4	Peak 1330	Blue Hills	1330	480	Gold Mountain	1.67		Listed as Peak 1320 at Peakbagger
5	Peak 1291	Blue Hills	1291	401	Green Mountain	1.95		
6	Peak 1107	Blue Hills	1107	317	Peak 1291	0.86		
7	Peak 955	Blue Hills	955	305	Green Mountain	1.33		At south end of Lake Tahuya
8	Peak 730	Blue Hills	730	480	Kitsap Lookout	1.95		Inside Bremerton city limits Listed as Peak 720 at Peakbagger
9	Unnamed hill (Apex Airport hill)		525					2 miles west of Silverdale
10	Peak 510 (or Peak 500)		510	340		6.07		1.5 miles east of Kitsap Memorial State Park; northernmost 500-foot elevation in the county
10	Unnamed hill		c. 510					USGS topographic quad shows 500-foot contour approx. 1.5 mi. east of Breidablick
12	Peak 490		490	380	Peak 730	5.55		Near Illahee Preserve
13	Sawmill Lookout		460	260	Peak 500 (510)	3.7		2.75 miles northeast of Poulsbo
14	Peak 450		450	300	Vashon Island high point	3.88		Near Banner Forest Park
15	Kingston View Point		440	340	Peak 510	4.81		Above Kingston ferry terminal. Listed as 450 ft. at Lists of John.
16	Toe Jam Hill*	Bainbridge Island	425	425	Peak 490	6.66		Bainbridge Island high point
17	Peak 410		410	380	Peak 450	4.10		Inside Port Madison Indian Reservation

*The Bainbridge Island high point's location is reported variously. Lists of John gives Gazzam Lake Hill based on USGS topographic maps, which used stereoscopic aerial surveys. Peakbagger gives Toe Jam Hill at 15 feet higher or more, based on newer high-resolution LIDAR maps.

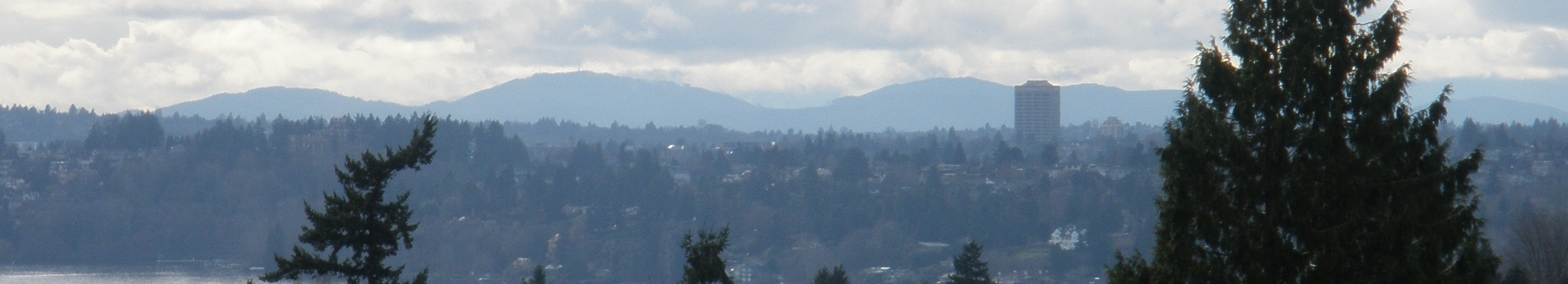
Blue Hills from the east: Kitsap Lookout, Gold Mountain and Green Mountain left to right
