= Blue Hills (Washington) =

Series of hills in Washington, United States

- Location within Washington (state)

Highest point
- Peak: Gold Mountain
- Elevation: 1,761 ft (537 m)
- Coordinates: 47°32′55″N 122°47′10″W

Geography
- Country: United States
- State: Washington
- Region: Western Washington
- Range coordinates: 47°33′00″N 122°48′00″W

The Blue Hills just west of Bremerton, Washington, also called the Bremerton Hills, Bald Hills, and Wildcat Hills, consist of Gold Mountain, Green Mountain, and several informally named hills. Reaching an elevation of 1761 feet (537 meters), a thousand feet above the glacial till that fills the Puget Lowland, they form a prominent landmark visible around the region. They are formed of uplifted blocks of marine basalts, the steep-walled canyons between the various summits being the fissures between the blocks (particularly prominent at Gold Creek and Union River). In addition to Gold Mountain and Green Mountain (the named members of the Blue Hills) are several other prominent peaks unofficially named according to their elevation (in feet):

- Kitsap Lookout
- Peak 1330 (also known as Peak 1320),
- Peak 1291.
- Peak 730 (also known as Peak 720).

For a more complete list of hills see List of mountains and hills of Kitsap County, Washington. The name "Blue Hills" is said to come from the green trees appearing blue at a distance due to atmospheric optics.

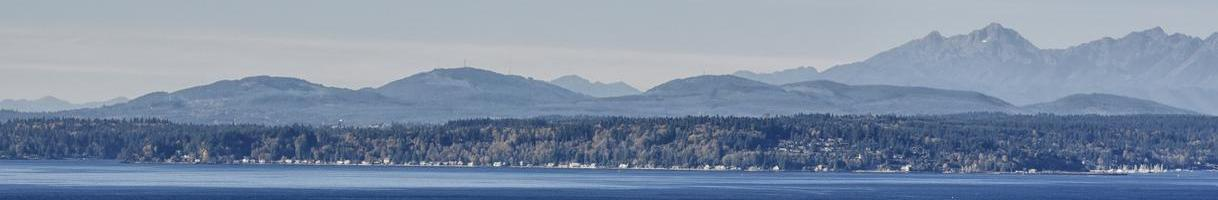
View from Betty Bowen viewpoint (Queen Anne Hill, Seattle) west-southwest across Puget Sound and Bainbridge Island to the Blue Hills. Prominent summits from left to right are: Kitsap Lookout, Gold Mountain, Green Mountain, and Peak 1291. Behind these peaks of the Olympic Mountains trend to the south. From the right: Mt. Ellinor, Mt. Washington (elevation 6,250'), and Mt. Pershing. Barely overlooking Green Mountain: Lightning Peak and Dry Mountain. In the gap next to Gold Mountain the twin summits of Chapel Peak (~4,000') peek over Prospect Ridge (overlooks Lake Cushman). Visible to the left of Kitsap Lookout are several unnamed peaks in the vicinity of Vance Creek. Mouse-over for labels. See Peakfinder.org for more details.

== Geology ==
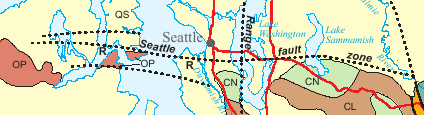
Location of the Blue Hills ("OP") at west end of the Seattle Fault, and the similar Cougar, Squak, and Tiger mountains ("CL") at east end. (Excerpt from DGER Geological Map (GM-52).)

The Blue Hills are perched on the north edge of the Seattle uplift, an east-west trending syncline or arch between the Seattle Fault and Tacoma Fault formed by north-south compression of the bedrock. (See Puget Sound faults#Geological setting.)

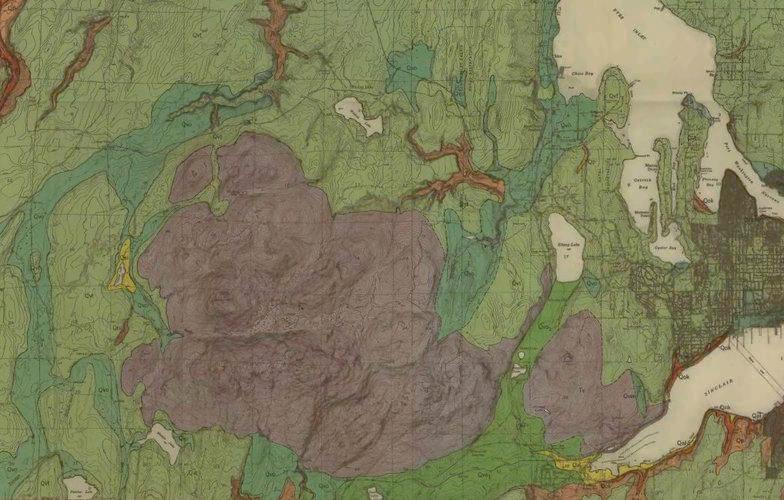
Geological map of central Kitsap County, Bremerton on the right. Purple is the uplifted bedrock that forms the Blue Hills. Distinct west-east fissure (Gold Creek) separates Green and Gold Mountains (north and south, resp.).

Gold Mountain (on the south) is composed mainly of marine basalt flows and related volcaniclastic rocks (such as breccias and sedimentary interbeds) of the Crescent Formation, part of the Siletzia terrane that formed around 50 million years ago (early Eocene). Green Mountain is formed of slightly older formations of gabbro and pegmatite, intruded by dikes of basalt and diabase. Most of the dikes are oriented north-northeast (NNE), suggesting they formed at a time of east-southeast–west-northwest (ESE-WNW) extension. This is parallel to the Olympic–Wallowa Lineament (OWL), a major regional feature that passes just north of Bremerton which some believe shows strike-slip (horizontal) motion, but a connection with the OWL is yet to be shown. Sharp downwarping of these formations has created numerous faults, including the dip-slip (vertical movement) Gold Creek fault that separates the two mountains. Strands of the Seattle Fault, which east of here trend nearly due west-east, appear to turn to the southwest in the vicinity of Green Mountain.

== Mining ==
Popular lore says Gold Mountain was so named on account of the presence of gold. However, state geological documents make no mention of any gold or gold mining in Kitsap County.

On Green Mountain, an old and much photographed adit near the headwaters of Tin Mine Creek is probably from the Chico "tin mine" the creek is named after. In 1895 it was reported that ore of three to five percent tin had been found in this vicinity, and the Cook Kitchen Mining Company had been incorporated with $2,000,000 of capital to develop the claim. An optimistic report in 1897 mentioned four shafts, one eighty-five feet deep, and there was report at the end of 1898 of a new shaft. However, in the 1897 report the means of reducing the ore were only "proposed"; there are no indications that any ore was produced or shipped. Neither the site nor the company is mentioned in reports at the turn of the century on mines and mineral resources in the state. A report in 1918 said that there had been "no subsequent developments to indicate the authenticity of this deposit", and that a careful examination in 1906 failed to show any tin.

The only other known metalliferous mining claim in all of Kitsap county – the "Elmer Nelson Property" – is on the south flank of Green Mountain, just above Gold Creek. Very little is known about this claim except its reported location and that development appears to have been limited to a surface trench. Cobalt is reported as the primary mineral of interest, with no mention of gold, silver, or any other mineral.

== Hydrology ==
The hills contain the headwaters of the Union River and Tahuya River, draining into Hood Canal south and southwest respectively. A number of creeks also rise in the hills, draining directly north into Hood Canal (e.g. Big Beef Creek, "the largest and most productive salmon stream on the northeast shore of Hood Canal"), northeast into Dyes Inlet (Lost Creek/Wildcat Creek/Chico Creek, "the most productive salmon stream in Kitsap County, producing as many salmon as all other streams combined") and east into Sinclair Inlet (Heins Creek/Gorst Creek).

=== Municipal water supply ===
The hills have long been identified as an important watershed for Bremerton and the surrounding area, as the Kitsap Peninsula has no major lakes or rivers, no access to mountain reservoirs fed by snowmelt, and the groundwater is limited in quantity and quality.

[The Kitsap Peninsula] approaches the description of school geographies – almost completely surrounded by water. Watersheds are limited and streams small and scattered...The [reservoir] most recently developed is the Union River, which has a watershed area of only 3.2 sq. mi but which, as a result of topographic conditions, is quite productive...

— Cliff Casad and John W. Cunningham, Construction of the Union River Dam at Bremerton, Wash., 1957

Moist Pacific air reaches the Blue Hills through a gap in the coastal ranges called Chehalis Gap. The Union River, which rises in the hills, was impounded in a deep valley on the eastern flank of Gold Mountain by Casad Dam, completed in 1957. The dam creates the Union River Reservoir supplying over half of Bremerton's annual requirements. 95% of the watershed's land was purchased by Bremerton in the 1920s, and is entirely within the Blue Hills.

== Recreation ==
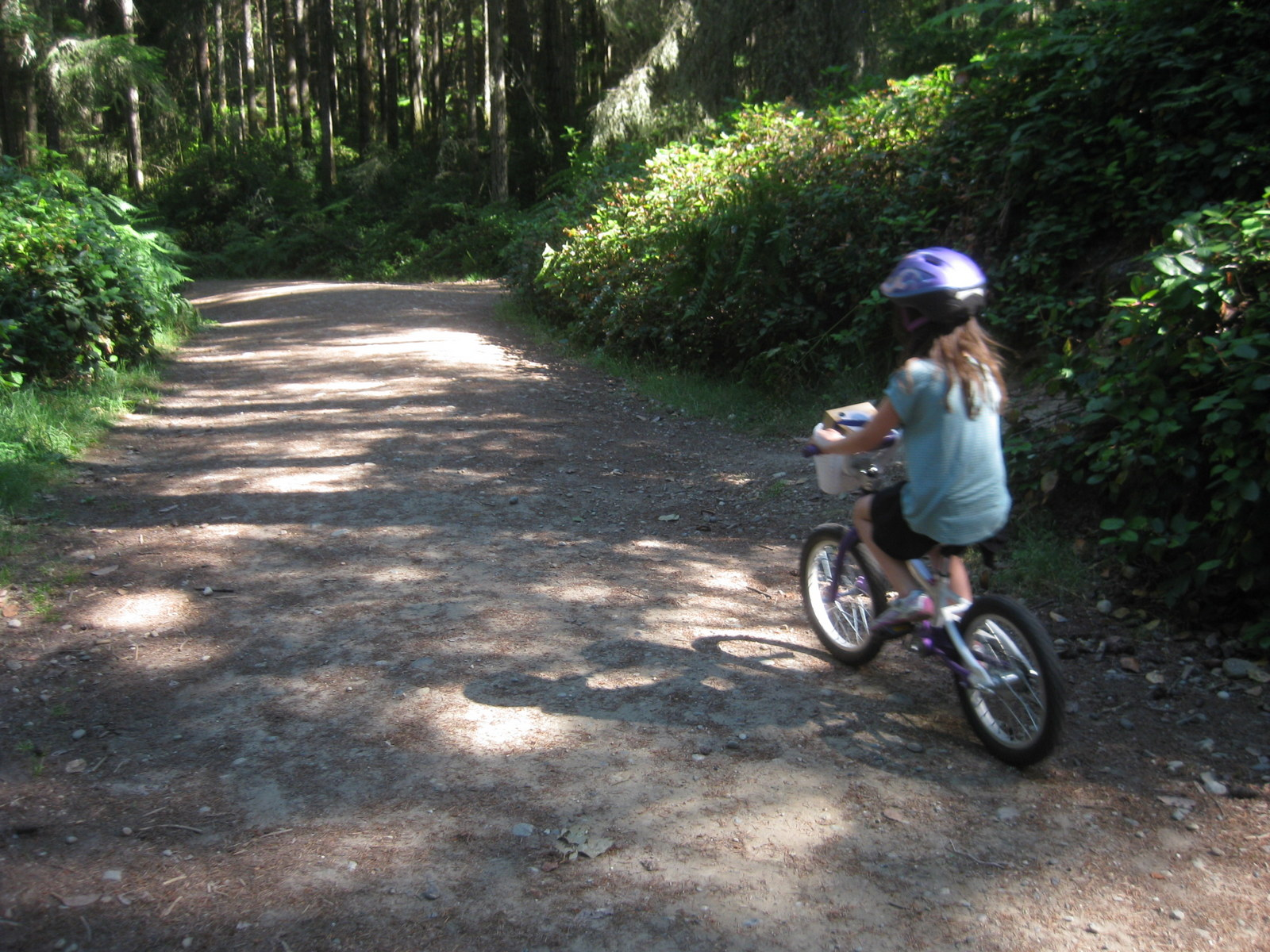
Girl bicycling on forest trails a few miles from Green Mountain

A number of developed and undeveloped areas for recreation exist in and near the Blue Hills. The largest that is open to the public is Green Mountain State Forest, a multi-use, over 6,000-acre (2,400 ha) state forest containing Green Mountain itself and owned by Washington State Department of Natural Resources. The state forest allows camping, off-road vehicles, horseback riding, and hiking. The Bremerton watershed contains the eastern half of Gold Mountain with an associated restricted protective buffer, and is somewhat larger than the state forest. Entry to the watershed by the general public is restricted, but Gold Mountain Golf Course was built on city watershed property on the south side of the hills. Together the watershed and Green Mountain State Forest represent over half of Kitsap County's open space.

The Mountaineers maintain an outdoor theatre, Kitsap Forest Theater, in their 386-acre (156 ha) Rhododendron Preserve on the north side of the hills.

There is one 386-acre (156 ha) former shooting range, Camp Wesley Harris, owned by the U.S. Navy, and the private Kitsap Rifle & Revolver Club.

Other facilities include county and city parks, as listed below.

City of Bremerton

- Gold Mountain Golf Course
- Newberry Hill Heritage Park
- Otto Jarstad Park
- Pendergast Regional Park

Kitsap County

- Wildcat Lake Park
- Central Kitsap Greenways
- Navy Yard City Open Space
