= Nathaniel Sargent =

Nathaniel Sargent may refer to:

- Nathaniel J. Sargent (1863-1954), American freedman and pioneer
- Nathaniel Peaslee Sargent (1731-1791), American justice on the Massachusetts Supreme Judicial Court
