= Union River (Washington) =

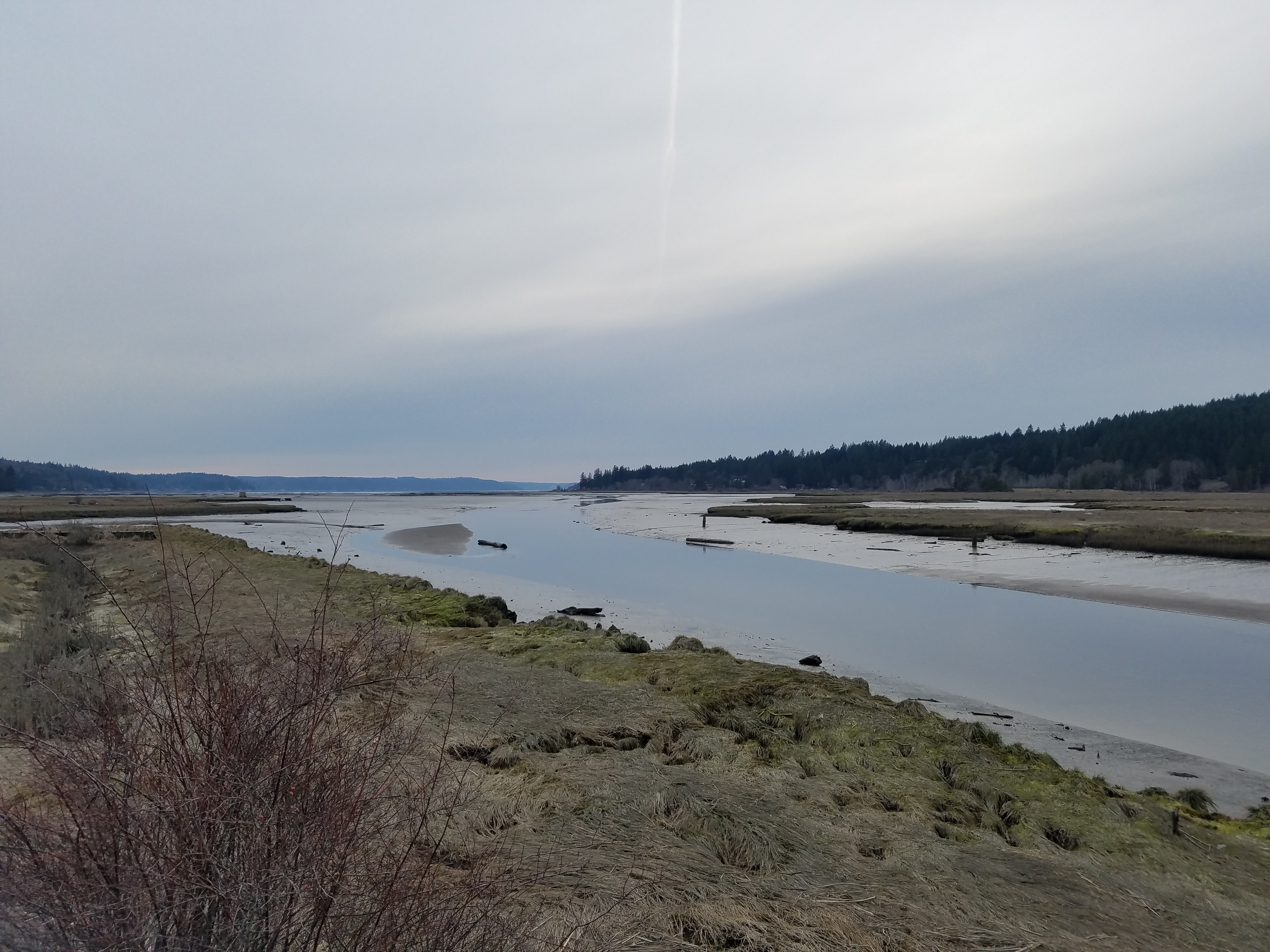
- Mouth of the Union River at the Hood Canal

- Location of the mouth of the Union River in Washington Union River (Washington) (the United States)

Location
- Country: United States
- State: Washington
- Counties: Kitsap, Mason

Physical characteristics
- Source: Kitsap Peninsula
  - coordinates: 47°34′0″N 122°45′44″W
- Mouth: Hood Canal
  - coordinates: 47°26′32″N 122°45′44″W

The Union River is a stream in the U.S. state of Washington. It originates in central Kitsap Peninsula and flows south, emptying into the end of Hood Canal. The Union River Reservoir provides drinking water for the nearby city of Bremerton.

== Course ==
The Union River originates in central Kitsap Peninsula a few miles west of Bremerton, east of Green Mountain and northeast of Gold Mountain. It flows south and slightly west. The river is impounded in its upper course by Casad Dam, creating the Union River Reservoir. Shortly downstream from the reservoir the river plunges over McKenna Falls. The East Fork Union River joins the main stem, below which the Old Belfair Highway runs through the river valley, paralleling the Union River. Near the town of Belfair the Union River empties into the extensive mud flats of Lynch Cove at the end of Hood Canal.

== See also ==
- List of rivers of Washington (state)
