= List of highest points in Washington by county =

This is a list of highest points in the U.S. state of Washington, in alphabetical order by county.

County	Name	Height feet / m	Prominence	Range	Notes
Adams	Unnamed point in the Karakul Hills	2,100 feet (640 m)	190 feet (58 m)	North Columbia Plateau	Located on private property. Indistinct field on farmland about 1.5 miles south of I-90. Closest access is via Ziemer Rd about 10 miles northeast of Ritzville.
Asotin	Ray Ridge	6,180 feet (1,880 m)	60 feet (18 m)	Blue Mountains	A low-prominence ridge about 20 miles south of Pomeroy. Accessible by a dirt spur road off of Peola Rd in the Umatilla National Forest. The Garfield County high point, Diamond Peak, is only 3 miles west.
Benton	Lookout Summit	3,629 feet (1,106 m)	1,849 feet (564 m)	Rattlesnake Hills	Highest point on Rattlesnake Mountain, a barren, 16 mile long mountain ridge about 6 miles north of Sunnyside. Accessible via a gated dirt road branching directly off of Washington State Route 241.
Chelan	Bonanza Peak	9,511 feet (2,899 m)	3,711 feet (1,131 m)	North Cascades	Highest non-volcanic peak in Washington. Considered the most difficult county high point outside of Alaska to summit due to the main route requiring a combination of glacier travel, a long approach, and class 4 exposure. Accessible through the Holden Lake trail outside of Holden Village.
Clallam	Gray Wolf Ridge	7,218 feet (2,200 m)	818 feet (249 m)	Olympic Mountains	Spur off of the Mount Deception massif. Non-technical, but requires ascending more than 5000 feet of elevation to summit. Accessible via Tyler Peak trailhead, 10 miles northwest of Quilcene.
Clark	Shoulder of Sturgeon Rock	4,080 feet (1,240 m)	0 feet (0 m)	South Washington Cascades	Slope point on the side of Sturgeon Rock, a large rock outcropping in the Yacolt Burn State Forest about 0.8 miles west of Silver Star Mountain. On the county line between Clark and Skamania counties. Easily accessible via the Grouse Vista Trailhead, 5 miles northeast of Washougal.
Columbia	Oregon Butte	6,387 feet (1,947 m)	2,407 feet (734 m)	Blue Mountains	Prominent grassy summit accessible from Teepee Trailhead about 20 miles southeast of Dayton. Diamond Peak, the highpoint of Garfield County, is located 6 miles east.
Cowlitz	Goat Mountain	4,965 feet (1,513 m)	2,005 feet (611 m)	South Washington Cascades	Accessible from forest roads NF-8817 or NF-470 outside of the Kalama Horse Camp near Cougar. No official trail leads to the summit.
Douglas	Badger Mountain	4,254 feet (1,297 m)	2,674 feet (815 m)	North Columbia Plateau	Large, gently sloping Plateau 10 miles northeast of Wenatchee. Highest point is a flat field off of Chipmunk Trail Road.
Ferry	Copper Butte	7,140 feet (2,180 m)	4,740 feet (1,440 m)	Monashee Mountains	Highly prominent gentle peak accessible via the Old Stagecoach Trail in the Colville National Forest. A 5.7 mile trail leads directly to the summit.
Franklin	Unnamed area on the Columbia Plateau	1,640 feet (500 m)	541 feet (165 m)	North Columbia Plateau	Gentle hill located on private property about 3 miles south of Washtucna. Access requires contacting the landowner.
Garfield	Diamond Peak	6,379 feet (1,944 m)	779 feet (237 m)	Blue Mountains	A lightly forested ridge about 20 miles south of Pomeroy. Most easily accessible through the Kelly Campground in the Umatilla National Forest. The Asotin County high point, Ray Ridge, is only 3 miles east. A trail to the summit at one point existed, but has become overgrown through lack of maintenance. Because of this, about a mile of off-trail travel is needed to ascend.
Grant	Beezley Hills High Point	2,899 feet (884 m)	749 feet (228 m)	North Columbia Plateau	Barren hill located on public land 10 miles north of Quincy. Easiest access is from Overen Rd near Ephrata.
Grays Harbor	Shoulder of Wynoochee Point	4,880 feet (1,490 m)	0 feet (0 m)	Satsop Hills	Slope point on the border with Mason County. Side of Wynoochee Point, a spur off of Capitol Peak in the southern Olympic foothills. Known for its access issues - no trail leads to the summit and the closest road is located 3 miles directly below the summit. The road is of dubious quality and is often inaccessible due to downed trees. Completing the summit requires ascending through thick underbrush for over 3 miles. As of 2026, the Grays Harbor County high point has only been reached 44 recorded times.
Island	Camano Island High Point	580 feet (180 m)	580 feet (180 m)		Indistinct area about 0.5 miles off trail in the woods of Camano Ridge Forest Preserve on Camano Island.
Jefferson	Mount Olympus	7,969 feet (2,429 m)	7,838 feet (2,389 m)	Olympic Mountains	Ultra prominent. Highest summit west of the Cascade Range and highest summit in the Olympic Mountains. A multi-day expedition is required in order to reach the base of the mountain, which is 30 miles from the nearest road. Accessible from the Hoh River Trail, which meanders for 30 miles through to the Hoh River Valley to the base of the mountain. Mount Olympus requires both glacier crossing and class 3 scrambling.
King	Mount Daniel	7,960 feet (2,430 m)	3,480 feet (1,060 m)	South Washington Cascades	Shared with Kittias County. Accessible from the Cathedral Rock Trailhead east of Randle. Highly popular, but requires class 3 scrambling and snow climbing experience.
Kitsap	Gold Mountain	1,761 feet (537 m)	1,521 feet (464 m)	Blue Hills	Highest point in the Blue Hills, a group of low forested summits in central Kitsap County about 10 miles west of Bremerton. Accessible via the Gold Creek Trailhead. A dirt maintenance road leads almost directly to the true summit, which is about 200 feet off of the road.
Kittitas	Mount Daniel	7,960 feet (2,430 m)	3,480 feet (1,060 m)	South Washington Cascades	Shared with King County.
Klickitat	Indian Rock	5,845 feet (1,782 m)	2,565 feet (782 m)	Simcoe Mountains	Large, sloping plateau located 15 miles northeast of Goldendale. Dirt roads lead to near the high point, which is marked by a large rock outcropping.
Lewis	Big Horn	8,000 feet (2,400 m)	240 feet (73 m)	South Washington Cascades	Located in the Goat Rocks area of the southern Cascade Mountains, within Mount Baker–Snoqualmie National Forest. By far the most technical county high point in Washington, and the only high point to require pitches and high level climbing experience. Big Horn is considered a difficult 5.4 rock climb.
Lincoln	Lilienthal Mountain	3,568 feet (1,088 m)	1,268 feet (386 m)	North Columbia Plateau	Obscure, privately owned summit near Miles. A dirt maintenance road near the junction of Egypt Rd and Bozeel Rd leads to the summit, which is gated off.
Mason	Mount Stone	6,612 feet (2,015 m)	2,132 feet (650 m)	Olympic Mountains	Accessible from the Putvin Trailhead in the Olympic National Forest. Required over 5000 feet of gain and class 3 scrambling to ascend.
Okanogan	North Gardner Mountain	8,956 feet (2,730 m)	3,996 feet (1,218 m)	North Cascades	
Pacific	Pacific County High Point	3,000 feet (910 m)	1,480 feet (450 m)	Willapa Hills	Prominent forested summit in the Willapa Hills on private forestry land. Legal access requires a permit from Weyerhauser. Accessed by an 8 mile long gated dirt road off of WA 6.
Pend Oreille	Gypsy Peak	7,320 feet (2,230 m)	1,720 feet (520 m)	Selkirk Mountains	Tallest mountain in eastern Washington. Most easily accessible from the Bear Pasture Trailhead outside of Metaline Falls. No official trail leads to the summit, which requires several miles of cross country travel to reach.
Pierce	Mount Rainier	14,411 feet (4,392 m)	13,210 feet (4,030 m)	South Washington Cascades	Ultra prominent, Highest point in Washington state.
San Juan	Mount Constitution	2,407 feet (734 m)	2,407 feet (734 m)		Popular tourist attraction, easily accessed by a paved road to the summit within Moran State Park. Second tallest island summit in the Lower 48 before Devils Peak in the Channel Islands.
Skagit	Mount Buckner	9,114 feet (2,778 m)	3,034 feet (925 m)	North Cascades	
Skamania	Mount Adams-West Slope	8,920 feet (2,720 m)	0 feet (0 m)	South Washington Cascades	Prior to its 1980 eruption, Mount St. Helens was 9,677 feet (2,950 m). Indistinct coordinate on the western slopes of Mt Adams located at 46.20314, -121.523683, near Pinnacle Glacier.
Snohomish	Glacier Peak	10,520 feet (3,210 m)	7,498 feet (2,285 m)	North Cascades	Ultra prominent. Most difficult volcano high point to reach, requiring an extremely long approach.
Spokane	Mount Spokane	5,883 feet (1,793 m)	3,503 feet (1,068 m)	Selkirk Mountains	Located within Mount Spokane Ski and Snowboard Park 23 miles north of Spokane. A paved road leads to the summit, but is typically only accessible during the summer months.
Stevens	Abercrombie Mountain	7,308 feet (2,227 m)	5,168 feet (1,575 m)	Selkirk Mountains	Ultra prominent. Accessible either from a trailhead in Silver Creek Campground east of Leadpoint or an unnamed trailhead northwest of Metaline Falls. Non technical trails lead directly to the summit.
Thurston	Quiemuth Peak	2,922 feet (891 m)	762 feet (232 m)	South Washington Cascades	Located in the extreme eastern corner of Thurston County about 3 miles south of Elbe. Was not named, nor discovered to be the county high point, until 1994. Quiemuth Peak is located on public forestry land and requires a 2 mile long bushwhack from a paved forest road to reach the completely forested summit.
Wahkiakum	Huckleberry Ridge	2,673 feet (815 m)	393 feet (120 m)	Willapa Hills	Located about 10 miles north of Skamokawa Valley. Forested ridge covered with dirt maintenance roads. Does not require a permit to access as of 2025, unlike most peaks in the Willapa Hills. Easiest method of climbing is via mountain biking.
Walla Walla	Lewis Peak	4,888 feet (1,490 m)	168 feet (51 m)	Blue Mountains	Located 7 miles east of Dixie. Lewis Peak Rd leads directly to the summit.
Whatcom	Mount Baker	10,781 feet (3,286 m)	8,812 feet (2,686 m)	North Cascades	Ultra prominent. Visible from much of western Washington on clear days. Extremely glaciated and significant glacier traversing experience is needed to safely summit.
Whitman	Tekoa Mountain	4,009 feet (1,222 m)	1,089 feet (332 m)	North Columbia Plateau	Located about 1 mile northeast of Tekoa. A road leads directly to the summit, but is located on private land.
Yakima	Mount Adams	12,276 feet (3,742 m)	8,116 feet (2,474 m)	South Washington Cascades	Ultra prominent. Least technical volcano high point to reach, requiring a simple snow climb without glacier travel on the most popular route.
