= Casad Dam =

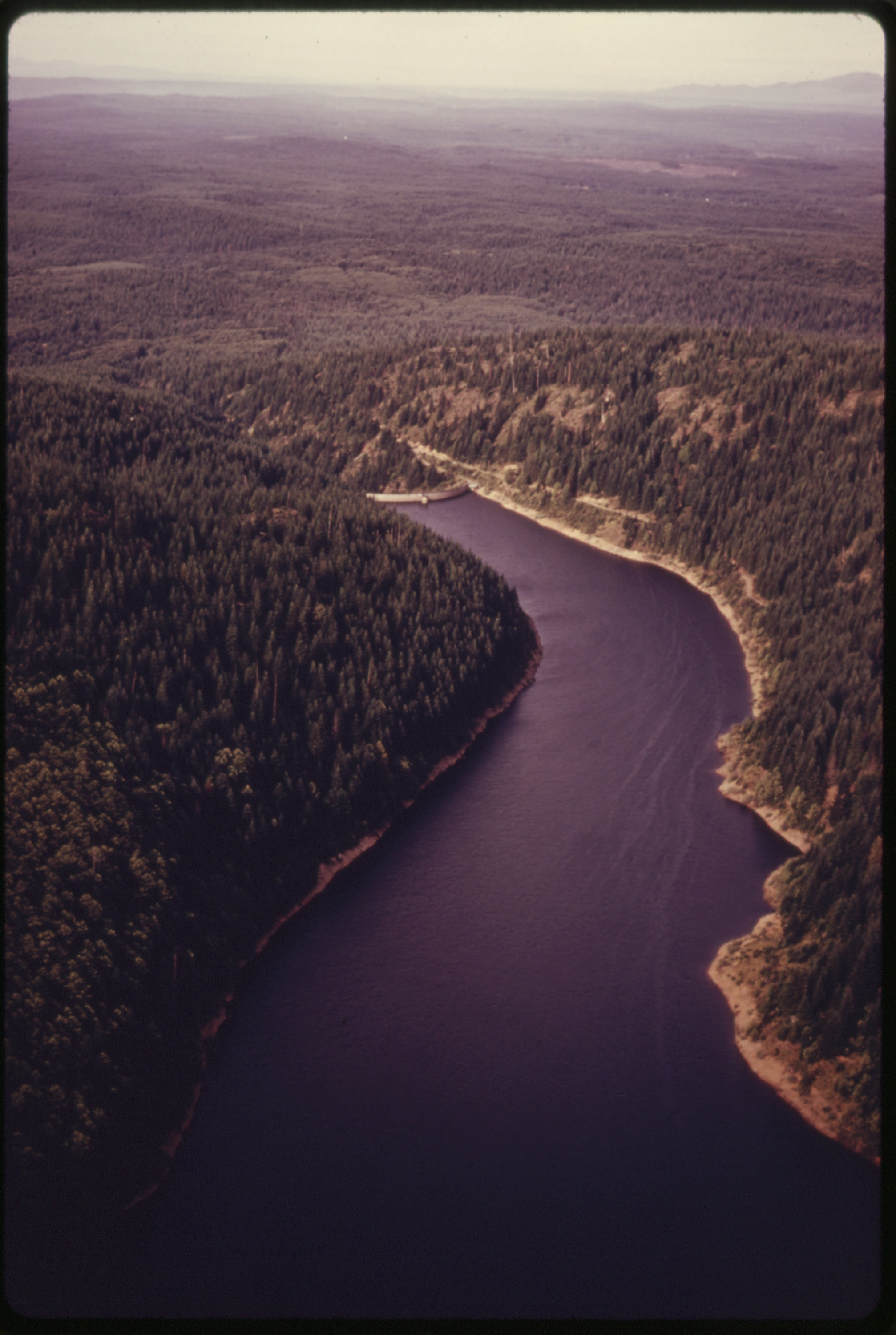
- Casad Dam (near center) and Union River reservoir

- Location within Washington (state)
- Country: United States
- Location: Bremerton, Washington
- Coordinates: 47°32′17″N 122°46′47″W
- Purpose: Municipal water supply
- Status: Operational
- Construction began: 1955
- Opening date: 1957
- Construction cost: $1.4 million
- Owner: City of Bremerton

Dam and spillways
- Type of dam: Concrete arch
- Impounds: Union River
- Height: 190 ft (58 m)
- Length: 416 ft (127 m)
- Elevation at crest: 643.7 ft (196.2 m)
- Width (base): 56 ft (17 m)

Reservoir
- Creates: Union River Reservoir
- Total capacity: 1,400,000,000 US gal (5,300,000 m^{3})
- Catchment area: 3,000 acres (1,200 ha)
- Surface area: 40 acres (16 ha)
- Normal elevation: 607 ft (185 m)
- Coordinates from USGS, specifications from factsheet unless noted

Casad Dam is a concrete arch dam in Bremerton, Kitsap County, Washington), built starting in 1955 and completed in 1957.

The dam is Kitsap County's only major water diversion structure, impounding Union River to form a reservoir that is the source of over half of Bremerton's municipal water supply. The water is gravity fed from the reservoir at 607 feet (185 m) in the hills to the city, most of which is at or near sea level.

Bremerton owns 95% of the land in its 3,000-acre (1,200 ha) watershed, and the Union River reservoir behind Casad Dam holds 1,400,000,000 US gallons (5,300,000 m^{3}) of water. The city is unusual in drawing most of its water supply from an open air source, the reservoir, which can occasionally be affected by algal blooms.

The dam's intake tower underwent seismic retrofit in 2012 to withstand a 0.78 g peak acceleration in a maximum credible earthquake from the Seattle Fault which runs about four miles (7 km) away, on the north side of Green Mountain.
