= Kitsap Lookout =

Mountain in Kitsap County, Washington, US

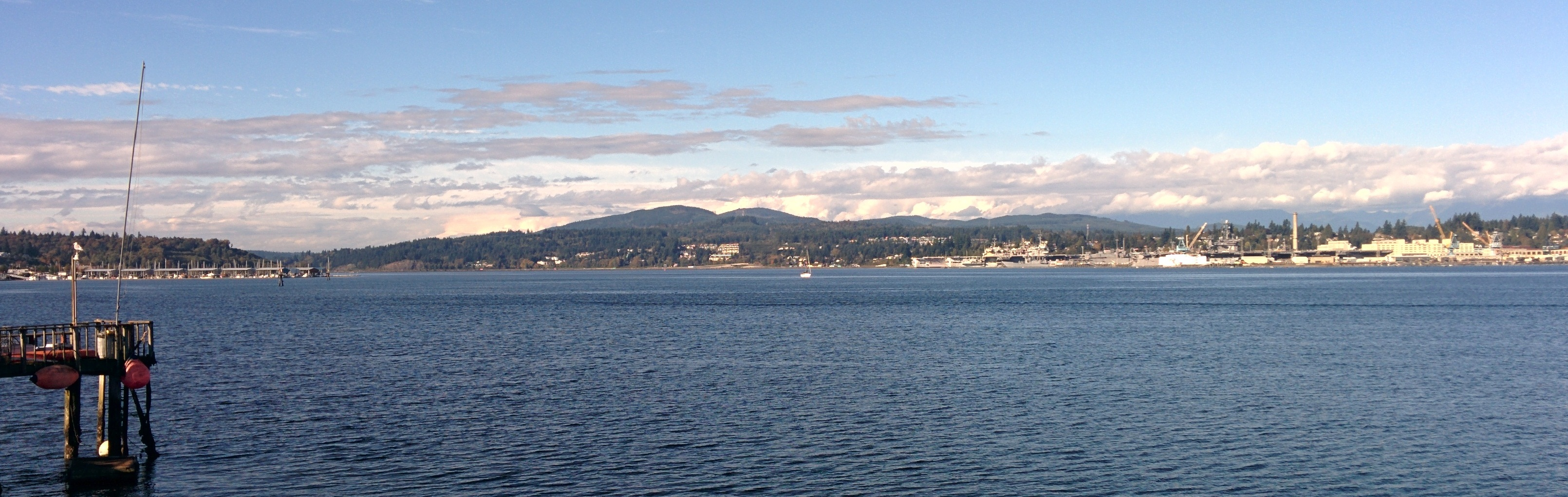
- Kitsap Lookout southeast aspect from Port Orchard, left of center. Right of center is Gold Mountain.

Highest point
- Elevation: 1,378 feet (420 m)
- Coordinates: 47°32′38″N 122°44′47″W

Geography
- Location: Kitsap County, Washington, United States
- Parent range: Blue Hills
- Topo map: USGS Bremerton West

Kitsap Lookout, also known variously as Peak 1370 or Peak 1380 on certain maps, is the most common name for a 1,378-foot (420 m) summit in the Blue Hills on the Kitsap Peninsula of Washington state, in the United States' Pacific Northwest. It is the third highest point in Kitsap County, Washington, lower than nearby Green Mountain and Gold Mountain.

The mountain lies almost entirely within the limits of the City of Bremerton watershed and is inaccessible to the general public. It lies near the outskirts of the Ueland Tree Farm, a 2,200 acre scenic tree farm in western Bremerton.

== Lookout Tower ==
A 60 foot tall abandoned naval observation tower sits on top of the forested summit, well hidden from view by the taller trees of the surrounding forest. It was likely built in the early 1940s during World War 2 and was tended until at least 1944. It was presumed to be destroyed until being rediscovered in the 2000s. Despite being built during wartime, its primary use was as a typical fire lookout. The structure still stands today but it is highly discouraged to visit due to being located on non-public government land.
