= KXOT =

KXOT may refer to:

- KXOT (FM), a radio station (106.3 FM) licensed to serve Los Lunas, New Mexico, United States
- KYFQ, a radio station (91.7 FM) licensed to serve Tacoma, Washington, United States, which held the call sign KXOT from 2004 to 2015
