= Rodney White (pioneer) =

Black pioneer (died August 27, 1913)

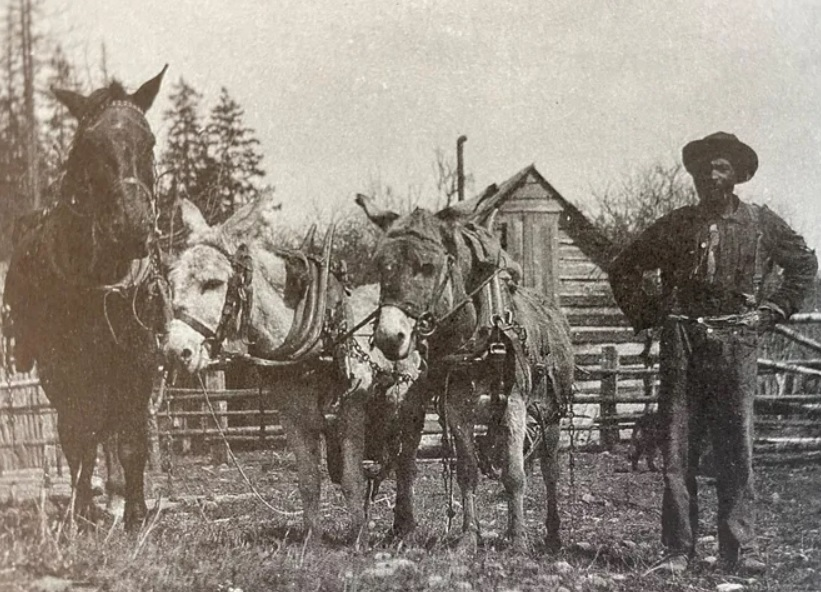
- Rodney White and his livestock
- Born: Missouri, US
- Died: August 27, 1913 [Seattle, Washington, US]
- Occupation: Farmer

Rodney White (died August 27, 1913) was a Black pioneer in Washington who settled in Tahuya. After his death, the swamp where he built his homestead was named after a racial slur. It was officially renamed the "Rodney White Slough" on October 27, 2022.

== Life ==
While much of White's early life is unknown, he was born into slavery in Missouri sometime in the mid-19th century. After being freed, White made his way to Roslyn, Washington before being hired for a mine construction job in Mason County. He filed a claim under one of the Homestead Acts for land and crossed the Puget Sound, from Seattle to Tahuya, on September 2, 1890. Two members of his party drowned while attempting to land the ferry in heavy winds. He quickly built a reputation for being a hard worker with "a heart of gold" and worked on his homestead until his death from pneumonia on August 27, 1913. By the time of his death, his homestead had grown to nearly 160 acres. His two donkeys, Baltimore and Babe, were given to the Woodland Park Zoo after his death.

== Legacy ==
After White's death, the swamp where he had built his homestead was given the derogatory name "Nigger Slough." This name appeared on maps until 1992, when the United States Board on Geographic Names renamed the area Grass Lake. On October 27, 2022, the Washington State Committee on Geographic Names renamed the swamp "Rodney White Slough" in White's honor. The move followed a campaign by local activists with the Living Arts Cultural Heritage Project. The change was finalized by the Washington State Department of Natural Resources on January 19, 2023, along with changes to several other geographic features to remove references to racial slurs.

== See also ==
- Nathaniel J. Sargent
