= Toe Jam Hill =

Hill on Bainbridge Island, Washington

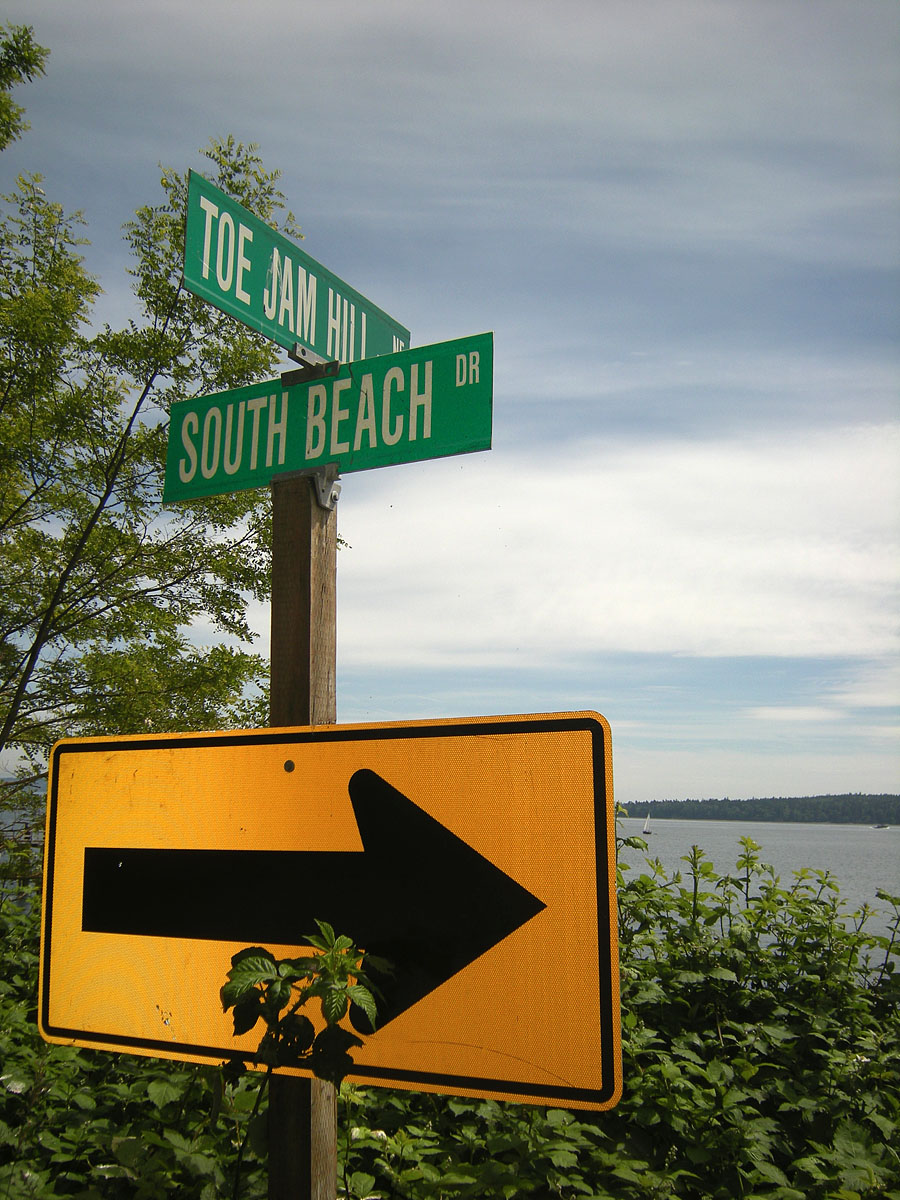
- Sign on Toe Jam Hill Road, overlooking Puget Sound

Highest point
- Elevation: 425 ft (130 m) NAVD 88
- Prominence: 425 ft (130 m)
- Coordinates: 47°35′03″N 122°30′08″W

Geography
- Location within Washington (state)
- Location: Kitsap County, Washington, U.S.
- Topo map: USGS Bremerton East

Toe Jam Hill, 425 feet tall, is the high point on Bainbridge Island, Washington and one of the highest points in Kitsap County, Washington.

Its name has several explanations, including that it was named for a local settler with the name Torjam (the explanation given by the local historical society), that it was named for stumbling drunkards, or that existing explanations are "all conjecture".

The hill was once a "villainous" milestone for bicycle riders on the Chilly Hilly season opener sponsored by Seattle's Cascade Bicycle Club, and on the Bainbridge Island Half Marathon, formerly called Toe Jam Hill Half Marathon.

The Bainbridge Island high point's location is reported variously at highpointing websites. Listsofjohn.com gives Gazzam Lake Hill based on USGS topographic maps, which used photographic aerial surveys and stereoplotters. Peakbagger.com gives Toe Jam Hill at 15 feet higher or more, based on newer high-resolution LIDAR maps.

LIDAR surveys in the 1990s also identified a geologic fault, now named the Toe Jam Hill Fault, north of the hill. It may intersect and may be secondary to the Seattle Fault. It was the first fault discovered by laser imagery.

A city park, Nutes Pond Park (also spelled Nute's Pond), was created on Toe Jam Hill in 2011.
