= Ayahos =

Coordinates: 47.52270°N 122.39431°W

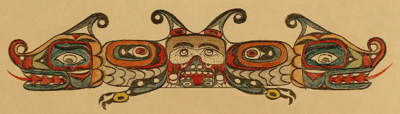
Representation of the Ayahos spirit

An Ayahos (Lushootseed: ʔayahus; spelled variously in English as A'yahos, Ayahus, Aiyahus) is a spirit power in the traditional religion of the Lushootseed-speaking peoples of Puget Sound. A rock near the Fauntleroy ferry terminal in Seattle, Washington is associated with the Ayahus. The Ayahos is a "malevolent and dangerous" spirit, capable of shapeshifting, who sometimes appears in a two-headed serpent form, who is associated with other earthquake-related areas like landslides near the Seattle Fault.

LIDAR imagery of the Seattle area revealed a previously unknown landslide in the Fauntleroy area. Another area associated with the Ayahos near Mercer Island could be related to the Lake Washington sunken forests, caused by landslides triggered by a Seattle Fault event around 900 CE.
