= Tahuya River =

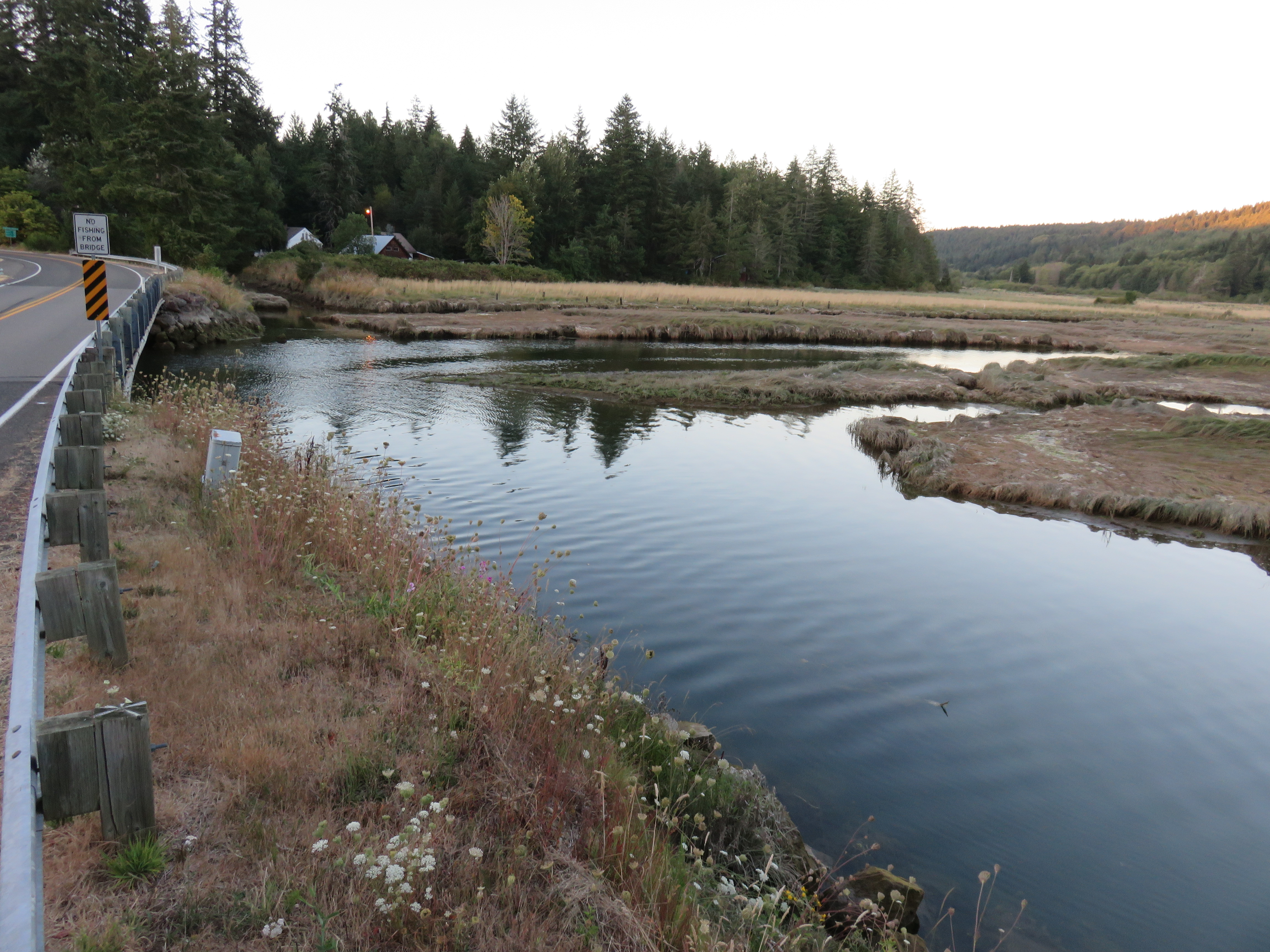

- Location of the mouth of the Tahuya River in Washington

Location
- Country: United States
- State: Washington
- Counties: Kitsap, Mason

Physical characteristics
- Source: Tahuya Lake
  - coordinates: 47°33′32″N 122°50′6″W
- Mouth: Hood Canal
  - coordinates: 47°22′13″N 123°3′5″W

The Tahuya River is a stream in the U.S. state of Washington. It originates at Tahuya Lake in western Kitsap Peninsula and flows south, emptying into Hood Canal near the Great Bend.

== Course ==
The Tahuya River originates at Tahuya Lake, west of Green Mountain and northwest of Gold Mountain. The Tahuya river is fed by two principal streams, Tin Mine Creek and Gold Creek. From the lake the Tahuya River flows south and slightly west. Panther Creek, flowing from Panther Lake, joins the river. Numerous small streams and wetlands drain into the river. Near Hood Canal the river flows becomes braided as it flows through a wetland-dominated valley. It broadens into a muddy bay as it enters Hood Canal near the town of Tahuya. The Tahuya river has 45.1 square miles with 21 miles mainstream.

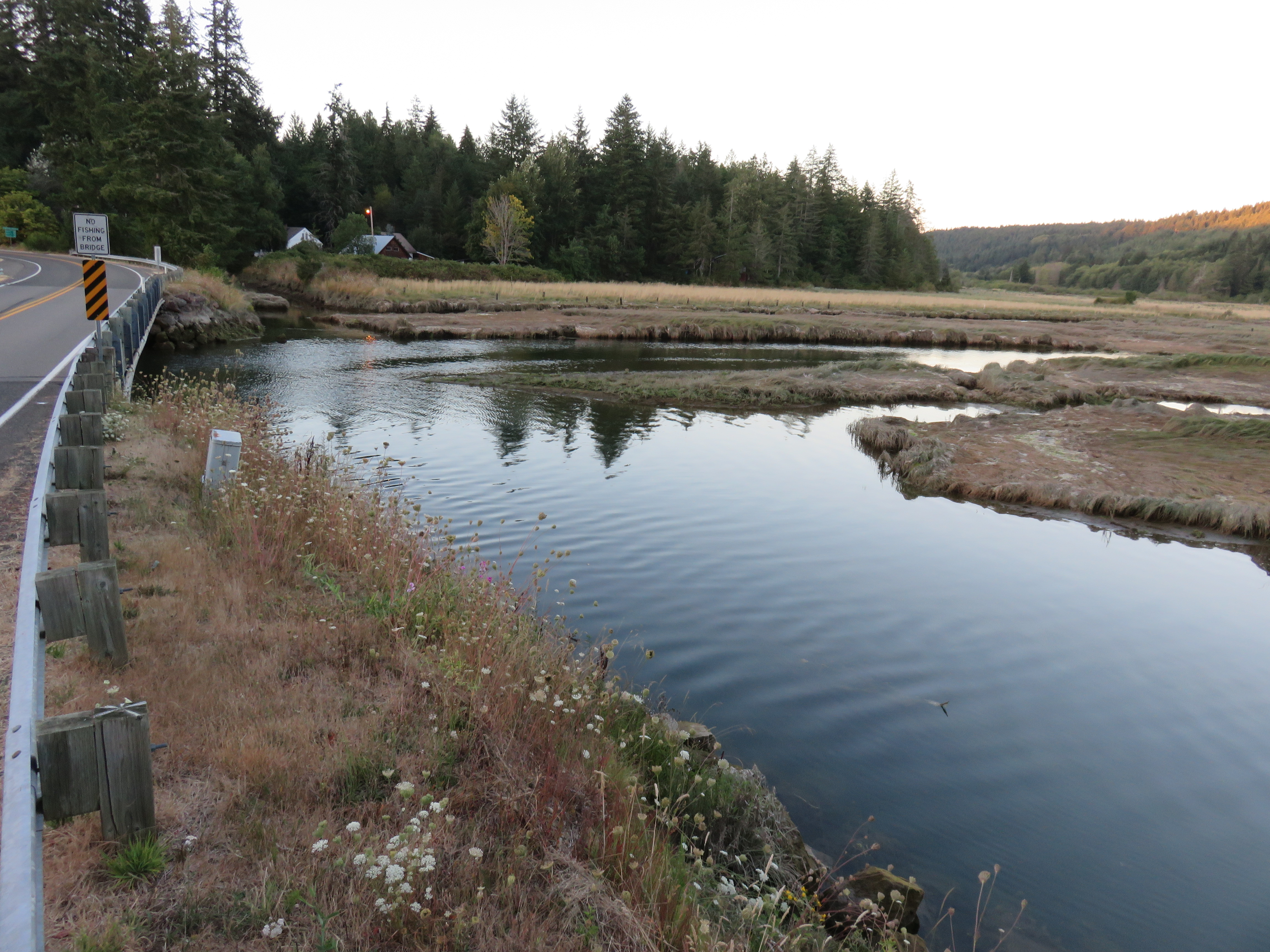
The Tahuya River estuary at Tahuya Bay, where the river empties into the Hood Canal. Photograph taken from the bridge at NE North Shore Road, sunset, 17 August 2017.

== See also ==
- List of rivers of Washington (state)
