= Tahuya, Washington =

Unincorporated community in Washington, United States

- Unincorporated community
- Location within Washington (state) Location within the United States
- Coordinates: 47°22′16″N 123°03′21″W
- Country: United States
- State: Washington
- County: Mason
- Elevation: 13 ft (4.0 m)
- Time zone: UTC-8 (Pacific (PST))
  - Summer (DST): UTC-7 (PDT)
- GNIS feature ID: 1526901

Tahuya is an unincorporated community in Mason County, Washington, United States. As of the 2020 census, the population of Belfair-Tahuya CCD was 9,439. It is located on the Hood Canal at the mouth of the Tahuya River. Tahuya, whose name comes from a Twana term meaning "that done", features a number of recreational areas. The ZIP Code for Tahuya is 98588.

== Arts and culture ==
The first Saturday in July marks the annual Tahuya Day celebration, which includes a parade, food booths and vendors, and other attractions. According to the official tourism website for the county, locals largely recognize Tahuya Day as a celebration of the quirky place that residents live in "by choice".

== Parks and recreation ==
Tahuya is on the edge of the Hood Canal, a slender and deep saltwater fjord flowing in from the Strait of Juan de Fuca. Fishing, boating and shellfishing are popular here in the spring, summer and fall. Nearby sits the Tahuya State Forest, which encompasses several campgrounds and over 100 miles of off-road vehicle (ORV) and mountain biking trails.

Tahuya's Rendsland Creek is designated by the Washington Department of Fish and Wildlife as an enhanced shellfishing beach, where visitors can harvest clams 6 months out of the year, and Hood Canal oysters year round.

The "Rodney White Slough" in Tahuya was named after Rodney White, a Black pioneer who had a homestead in the area.
