= KYFQ =

Coordinates: 47°32′53″N 122°48′22″W

- Tacoma, Washington; United States
- Broadcast area: Seattle-Tacoma metropolitan area
- Frequency: 91.7 MHz

Programming
- Format: Christian talk and teaching
- Affiliations: Salem Radio Network (SRN)

Ownership
- Owner: Bible Broadcasting Network, Inc.

History
- First air date: 1949 (as KTOY)
- Former call signs: KTOY (1949-1986); KTPS-FM (1986–1992); KBTC-FM (1992–2004); KXOT (2004–2015)

Technical information
- Licensing authority: FCC
- Facility ID: 62470
- Class: C1
- ERP: 4,300 watts
- HAAT: 582 meters (1,909 ft)

Links
- Public license information: Public file; LMS
- Webcast: Listen Live
- Website: bbnradio.org

KYFQ (91.7 MHz) is a non-commercial FM radio station licensed to Tacoma, Washington, and serving the Seattle-Tacoma radio market. The station is owned by Bible Broadcasting Network, Inc. It airs a Christian talk and teaching radio format.

National religious leaders heard on KYFQ include Chuck Swindoll, Adrian Rogers and Joni Eareckson Tada. Some news and programming is provided by the Salem Radio Network (SRN).

== History ==
=== Tacoma School District ===
In 1949, the station first signed on as KTOY. It was owned by the Tacoma School District and had its studios at its vocational school, which became Bates Technical College in 1991. During the day it was operated by Bates broadcasting students studying under former KJR DJ Lee Perkins. It was powered at 3,500 watts, enough to cover Tacoma and adjacent communities but not the larger Seattle radio market.

From 1978 to 1984, KTOY aired educational programs during the day, with Top 40 hits in the afternoon and evening. Starting at midnight on Friday and lasting until 6:00 p.m. Sunday, KTOY broadcast hip hop music and urban contemporary under the slogan "Giving You The Music of Tomorrow, Today." During 1983–1984, the late night hip-hop program's slogan was "R&B's best in the Pacific Northwest." By 1985, the urban format was no longer the entire weekend.

In the 1980s, the power was increased to 7,900 watts. The station changed its call sign to KTPS-FM for Tacoma Park Schools, in 1986. Then in 1992, the call letters were switched to KBTC for Bates Technical College. The station only played hip-hop and urban music on Sunday for two hours in the form of a top 20 countdown.

=== Public Radio Capital ===
KBTC was sold to Public Radio Capital, which then leased the frequency to the University of Washington's college station, 90.3 KEXP. KEXP wanted to extend its signal into the South Sound. So it simulcast its regular alternative rock programming on 91.7, changing its call letters to KXOT.

On November 3, 2005, KEXP announced it was terminating operation on KXOT at the end of the calendar year due to a financial crunch. However, KEXP continued to simulcast on KXOT into 2006 while Public Radio Capital decided what to do with 91.7. On May 24, 2006, NPR network affiliate 94.9 KUOW-FM announced it signed a new lease with PRC. KXOT returned to the air, run by KUOW-FM, but airing alternate programming as KUOW-2, in August 2006.

On May 15, 2012, PRC announced that it would drop its KUOW-2 programming on 91.7 on June 29. However, this was delayed until July 2. The station went silent at midnight on that day, as the station was awaiting a new programming provider.

On January 7, 2013, the station returned to the air, from a new transmitter site on Gold Mountain, coupled with an increase in power to 23,000 watts. The station aired the audio from Washington State's public affairs government television channel TVW.

=== Bible Broadcasting Network ===
The Bible Broadcasting Network announced on February 4, 2015, that it would purchase KXOT from PRC for $2.4 million. PRC then took the station off-the-air until the completion of the sale.

Upon taking control on May 13, BBN relaunched the station as KYFQ. The station began running BBN's schedule of Christian talk and teaching programs.
