= Nathaniel J. Sargent =

Black pioneer (1863–1954)

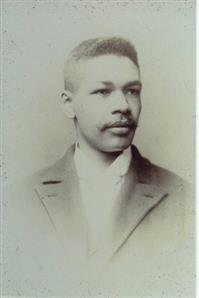
Photograph of Sargent

Nathaniel J. Sargent (July 4, 1863 – August 16, 1954) was a Black pioneer in Washington who settled in Kitsap County.

== Life ==
Sargent was born into slavery in Kentucky on July 4, 1863. After being freed, he was raised by a white family and attended the University of Illinois. Sargent moved to Kitsap County, Washington in 1882, making money as a lumberjack and a rancher. He had initially intended to homestead in Oregon, but the state's Jim Crow laws prevented him from doing so.

In 1894 or 1897, Sargent was elected Justice of the Peace for Seabeck. Over the course of his life, Sargent built up a 248-acre ranch, eventually giving some of the land away to found a school.

He died on August 16, 1954, after several years in the hospital. He was buried in the Seabeck Cemetery. His grave was unmarked for many years, with a headstone only being added sometime in the 2010s.

== Legacy ==
On October 27, 2022, the Washington State Committee on Geographic Names renamed a lake north of Tahuya "Nathaniel Sargent Lake" in his honor. The body of water had been known by the derogatory name "Negro Slough" through the 1990s, later being renamed "Grass Lake." The change was finalized by the Washington State Department of Natural Resources on January 19, 2023, along with changes to several other geographic features to remove references to racial slurs. The formal renaming took place on February 9, 2023.

== See also ==
- Rodney White (pioneer)
