= Tacoma Fault =

Active east–west striking north dipping reverse fault

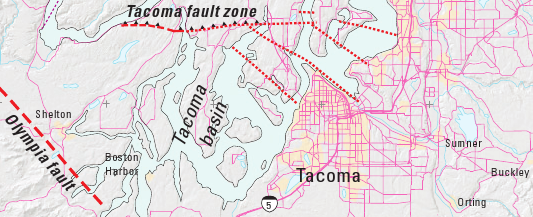
Tacoma fault zone, with multiple southeast-striking strands.(USGS)

The Tacoma Fault, just north of the city of Tacoma, Washington, is an active east–west striking north dipping reverse fault with approximately 35 miles (56 km) of identified surface rupture. It is believed capable of generating earthquakes of at least magnitude M_{w} 7, and there is evidence of such a quake approximately 1,000 years ago, possibly the same earthquake documented on the Seattle Fault 24 miles (38 km) to the north.

== Geology ==
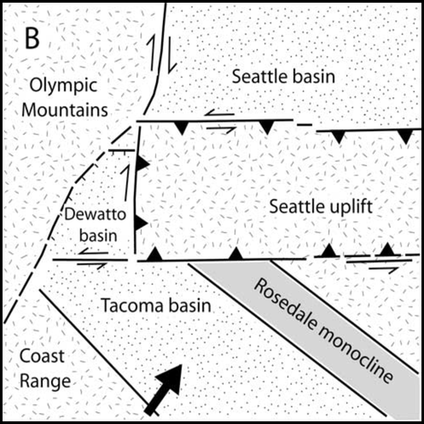
Hypothesized structure of the west end of the Seattle Uplift, showing left-lateral strike-slip movement if shortening is from the southwest (arrow). SF = Seattle Fault, TF = Tacoma Fault, EPZ = East Passage Zone. From Johnson & others (2004), fig. 18B.

The Tacoma Fault – actually a zone of connected faults – was first suspected from gravitational surveying in the 1960s, subsequently confirmed by seismic reflection and other geophysical data, and traced by detailed Lidar mapping; trenching and other paleoseismological studies have documented late Holocene uplift. It extends west to the small town of Allyn (near the tip of Hood Canal), terminating at the same north-striking geophysical anomaly (tentatively named the Tahuya Fault) that terminates the Seattle Fault to the north. To the east one strand is aligned with Commencement Bay and the Puyallup River, other strands (or related faults) cross the East Passage of south-central Puget Sound. How far east these faults extend is not known, but probably as far as the Kent Valley.

=== Seattle Uplift ===
The Tacoma Fault Zone marks the south end of the Seattle Uplift, of which the similar and related Seattle Fault Zone marks the north end. This uplift is believed to be either a slab of rock about 15 km thick being pushed up a ramp, or a wedge being popped up between these two faults, by tectonic forces from the south or south-west as tectonic plates riding on top of the Juan de Fuca plate are pushed against the North American craton.

The relationship of the Seattle Uplift with other neighboring blocks, and the nature of the faults between them, is not well known. If tectonic strain is from the south, and therefore perpendicular to the Seattle and Tacoma Faults, the motion on them should be entirely dip-slip (vertical). If tectonic strain is from the south-west (see adjoining diagram), perpendicular to the Rosedale monocline, and also to the Olympia Fault (south-west boundary of the Tacoma Basin) and South Whidbey Island Fault (north-east of the Seattle Basin), both of which are parallel to the Rosedale monocline (and also to the Olympic–Wallowa Lineament, whose significance here is not known), then there should be some component of left-lateral strike-slip motion on parts of the Seattle and Tacoma faults. There has been a suggestion that the position of the Seattle and Tacoma faults may correlated with strain accumulation in the Olympic Mountains (to the west), but this is yet to be worked out.

== Hazard ==
Based on observed length (actual length is probably substantially greater) the Tacoma Fault is believed capable of generating an earthquake of at least magnitude 7, comparable to the earthquake on the Seattle Fault 1100 years ago (A.D. 900–930). Although this would release only one percent of the energy of a magnitude 9 subduction zone earthquake, in being closer to the surface and confined to a smaller area damage would be more severe. It has been estimated that such an earthquake on the similar Seattle Fault would damage 80 bridges in the Seattle–Tacoma highway corridor, comparable to an estimated 87 bridges damaged in all of western Washington from a M 9 subduction earthquake. For a M 6.7 quake on the Tacoma Fault, it was estimated that 20 to 35 bridges would be damaged; losses to the regional economy due just to the damaged highway infrastructure would be over $3 billion.

Calculations of ground motions for a M 7.1 earthquake on the Tacoma Fault indicates that most of Tacoma would experience moderate damage (depending on type of construction and local conditions). Heavy damage would be expected in a zone just north of the fault, especially on Maury Island, and extending across Federal Way to the cities of Auburn and Kent.

Computer simulations show that the same M 7.1 earthquake would generate a tsunami. It is expected that the industrial areas on Commencement Bay, most of the low-lying areas on the Puyallup River delta (including Fife), and parts of Interstate 5 would be inundated within about five minutes. Strong shaking may cause slope failures, including landslides; underwater landslides may cause additional tsunamis. The small beach communities common along Puget Sound, usually at the base of high bluffs, will thus be doubly endangered, by landslides and tsunamis.

== See also ==
- Geology of the Pacific Northwest
- Puget Sound faults
- Seattle Fault
