= Seattle Fault =

Zone of multiple thrust faults that passes through Seattle

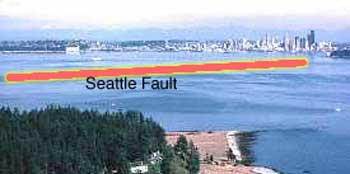
- The Seattle Fault cuts across Puget Sound and into Seattle itself. Restoration Point in the foreground, Alki Point is barely seen at the right edge of the picture.
- Etymology: Seattle
- Coordinates: 47.610°N 122.333°W
- Country: United States
- State: Washington
- Cities: Seattle

Characteristics
- Part of: Puget Sound faults
- Length: 43 mi (70 km)

Tectonics
- Plate: North American
- Status: Active
- Earthquakes: c. 900 CE
- Type: Thrust fault
- Movement: Reverse
- Age: Eocene-recent (40-0 Ma)

The Seattle Fault is a zone of multiple shallow east–west thrust faults that cross the Puget Sound Lowland and through Seattle (in the U.S. state of Washington) in the vicinity of Interstate Highway 90. The Seattle Fault was first recognized as a significant seismic hazard in 1992, when a set of reports showed that about 1,100 years ago it was the scene of a major earthquake of about magnitude 7 – an event that entered Native American oral traditions. Extensive research has since shown the Seattle Fault to be part of a regional system of faults.

== Notable earthquake ==
First suspected from mapping of gravitational anomalies in 1965 and an uplifted marine terrace at Restoration Point (foreground in picture above), the Seattle Fault's existence and likely hazard were definitively established by a set of five reports published in Science in 1992. These reports looked at the timing of abrupt uplift and subsidence around Restoration Point and Alki Point (distant right side of picture), tsunami deposits on Puget Sound, turbidity in lake paleosediments, rock avalanches, and multiple landslides around Lake Washington, and determined that all these happened about 1,100 years ago (between 923 and 924 CE, and most likely due to an earthquake of magnitude 7 or greater on the Seattle Fault.

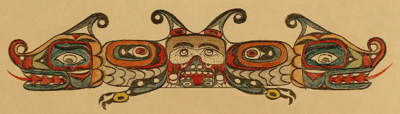
Representation of the a'yahos spirit.

Although the 923-924 CE earthquake was over a thousand years ago, local traditional stories have preserved an association of a powerful supernatural spirit – a'yahos, noted for shaking, rushes of water, and landsliding – with five locales along the trace of the Seattle Fault, including a "spirit boulder" called Psai-Yah-hus near the Fauntleroy ferry dock in West Seattle.

== Geology ==
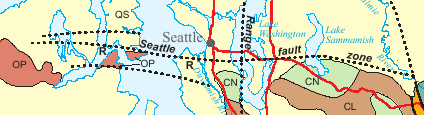
Approximate location of the Seattle Fault Zone (and other faults). The section of the fault zone directly under "Seattle" corresponds to the red line in the photo at the top. (DGER)

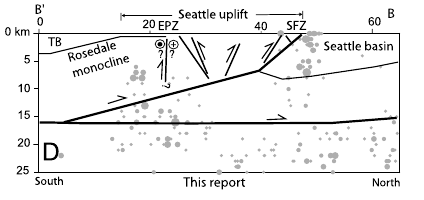
One model of the Seattle Uplift: Cross-section (south to north) along the east side of central Puget Sound, looking west. TB = Tacoma Basin EPZ = East Passage Zone (Maury Island), SFZ = Seattle Fault Zone (Alki Point). Grey dots are hypocenters of earthquakes of magnitude 2 or more for 1970–2001. (Fig. 17D from Johnson & others 2004)

The Seattle Fault is the structural boundary where 50–60 million years old (early Tertiary) basalt of the Crescent Formation on the south has been uplifted – the Seattle Uplift – and is tipping into the Seattle Basin, where the Tertiary bedrock is buried under at least 4.3 mi (7 km) of relatively softer, lighter sedimentary strata of the younger Blakeley and Blakely Harbor formations. This has resulted in a 2.5-to-4.3-mile (4 to 7 km) wide zone of complex faulting, with three or more main south-dipping thrust faults. Most of the faulting is "blind" (not reaching the surface), and generally difficult to locate because of heavy vegetation or development. Three principal strands have been identified, their location determined by high-resolution seismic reflection and aeromagnetic surveys. The northernmost strand lies nearly along Interstate 90 and then under Lake Sammamish. The central section of the fault zone – where it crosses the apparent location of the Olympic–Wallowa Lineament – shows marked variation in the location of the strands and of the underlying structure, but the nature and significance of this is not understood.

The fault extends for approximately 43 mi (69 km) from near Fall City on the east, where it appears to be terminated by the South Whidbey Island Fault, to Hood Canal on the west (not shown on the map). However, boundaries defining the western termination zone is currently unclear (see Puget Sound faults#Question of western termination). It is the northern edge of the Seattle Uplift, of which the Tacoma Fault is the southern edge. One model has the Seattle and Tacoma faults converging at depth to form a wedge, which is being popped up by approximately north–south oriented compression that ultimately derives from plate tectonics. Another model (see diagram) interprets the Seattle Uplift as a sheet of rock that is being forced up a ramp. Subsequent work suggests that the structure of the Seattle Fault may vary from east to west, with both models being applicable in different sections. A later model has part of the north-thrusting sheet forming a wedge between the sedimentary formations of the Seattle Basin and the underlying bedrock.

The Seattle Fault is believed to date from about 40 million years ago (late Eocene). This is about the time that the strike-slip movement on the north-striking Straight Creek Fault to the east ceased, due to the intrusions of plutons. It appears that when the Straight Creek Fault became stuck the north–south compressive force that it had accommodated by strike-slip motion was transferred to the crust of the Puget Lowland, which subsequently folded and faulted, and the various blocks jammed over one another.

Other scarps associated with the Seattle fault have been identified by LIDAR-based mapping; trenching has generally shown the faulting to be more complex than was first realized. Many of the details of the Seattle Fault, including recurrence rate, remain to be resolved. A study of sediments in Lake Washington found evidence of seven large (M > 7) earthquakes in the last 3,500 years.

Surface scarps due to faulting are rarely observed in this area (due to topography, vegetation, and urbanization); a rare exception can be seen at Mee Kwa Mooks Park south of Alki Point. This is the site of the West Seattle Fault; the prominent rise there is due to uplift on the north side of the fault.

== Hazard ==
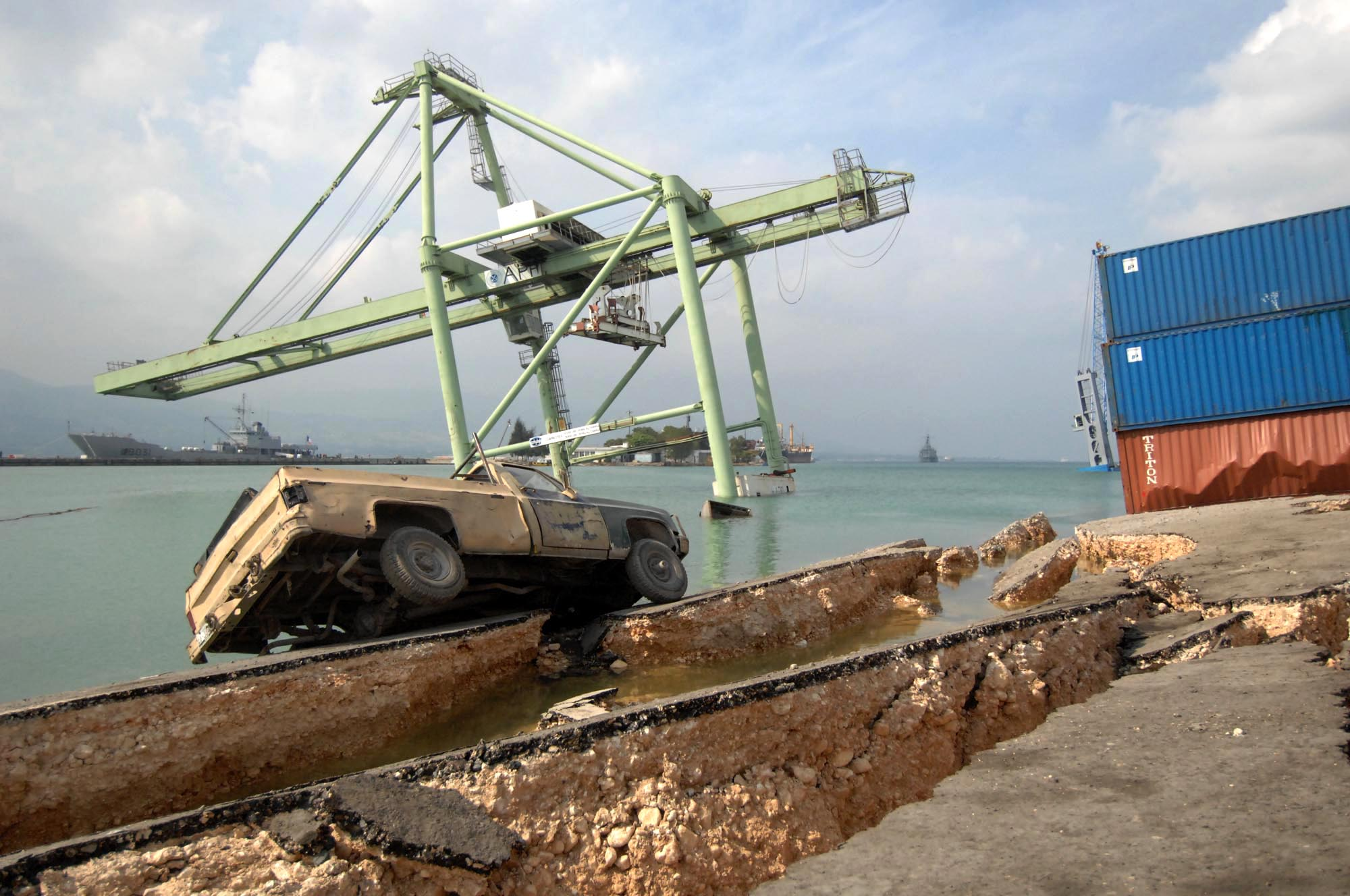
Shipping-container crane at Port-au-Prince (Haiti) harbor leaning after earthquake-induced ground failure. Seattle's waterfront faces similar risk

The Seattle Fault (and the related Tacoma Fault) is not the only source of earthquake hazard in the Puget Lowland. Other faults in the near surface continental crust, such as the South Whidbey Island Fault (near Everett), and the yet to be studied Olympia Fault (near Olympia), though historically quiescent, are suspected of generating earthquakes of around magnitude 7. Others, such as the 2001 Nisqually earthquake, originate about 31 to 37 mi (50 to 60 km) below Puget Sound in the Benioff zone of the subducting Juan de Fuca plate; being so deep their energy is dissipated. And there are the infrequent but very powerful great subduction events, such as the magnitude 9 1700 Cascadia earthquake, where the entire Cascadia subduction zone, from Cape Mendocino to Vancouver Island, slips.

But the Seattle and Tacoma faults are probably the most serious earthquake threat to the populous Seattle–Tacoma area. A 2002 study of bridge vulnerability estimated that a magnitude 7 earthquake on the Seattle Fault would damage approximately 80 bridges in the Seattle–Tacoma area, whereas a magnitude 9 subduction event would damage only around 87 bridges in all of Western Washington. The same study also found that with failure of just six bridges (the minimum damage for a Benioff M 6.5 event) there could be at least $3 billion lost in business revenue alone. Subsequent retrofitting by the Washington Department of Transportation and the City of Seattle would likely reduce damage to key bridges. But there is concern that such an earthquake on the Seattle Fault would devastate unreinforced masonry (URM) buildings, of which the City of Seattle is estimated to have around a thousand, concentrated in Capitol Hill, Pioneer Square, and the International District.

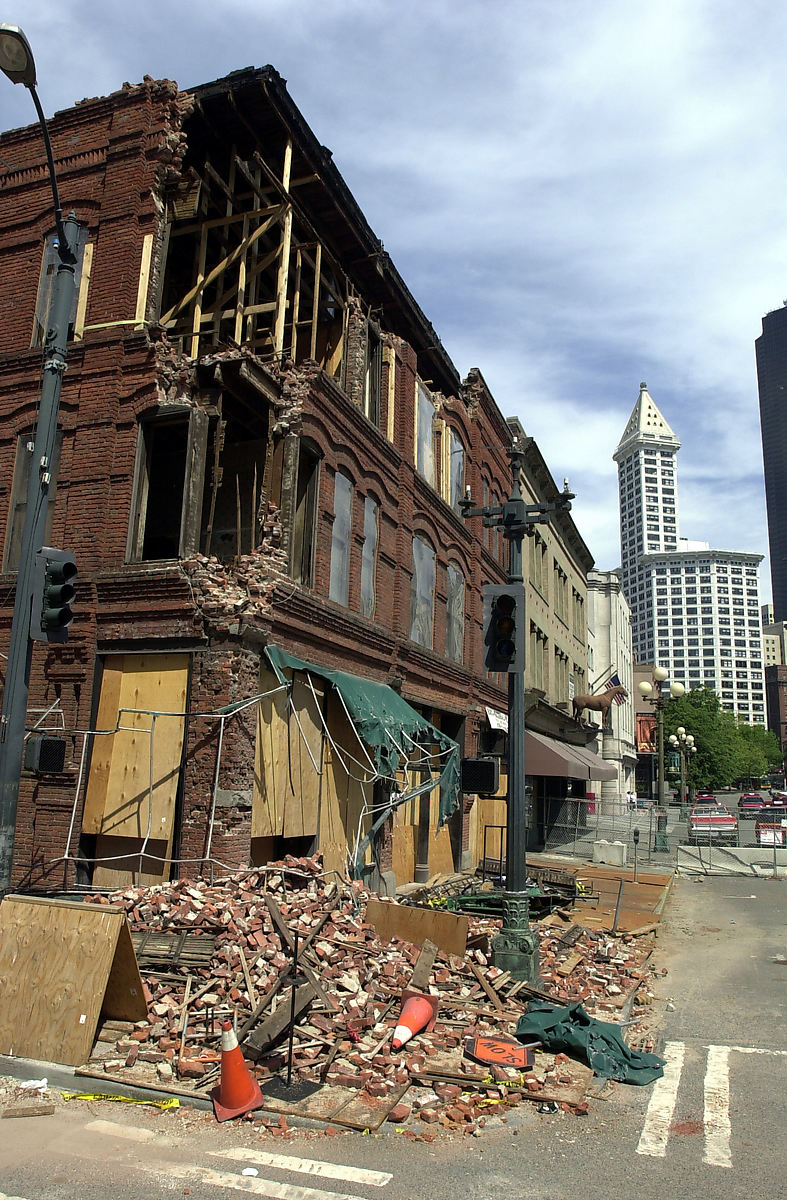
Damage to a masonry building (Cadillac Hotel) in Seattle, from the 2001 Nisqually earthquake

Other recent work indicates that the Seattle Fault can generate two types of earthquakes; both pose "considerable hazard" to the Seattle metropolitan region. The A.D. 900–930 earthquake is believed to be the only instance in the past 7,000 years of the type that causes a regional uplift. The other type is more localized and shallower (and therefore more damaging); at least four such events are believed to have occurred in the past 3,000 years on the west end of the fault. (The history of the central and eastern segments is not known.)

Calculations based on fault length and paleoseismological studies show that the Seattle Fault can generate a very damaging magnitude 7.0 earthquake. In addition to extensive damage to unreinforced structures and structures built on fill (such as much of Seattle's Pioneer Square area, the industrial area, and the waterfront), computer modeling has shown that such earthquakes could cause a tsunami of about 6 ft 7 in (2 m) high on Elliott Bay. The modeling shows that such a tsunami would also inundate the industrial areas on Commencement Bay 30 miles south (Tacoma) and low-lying areas on the Puyallup River delta. There is also concern that a severe or prolonged event could cause failure of the Duwamish or Puyallup River deltas, where the main port facilities for Seattle and Tacoma are located (Harbor Island and Commencement Bay).

== See also ==
- Geology of the Pacific Northwest
- Tacoma Fault

== Sources ==
- Anderson, M. L.; Dragovich, J. D.; Blakely, R. J.; Wells, R.; Brocher, T. M. (2008), "Where Does the Seattle Fault End? Structural Links and Kinematic Implications [Abstract #T23B-2022]", American Geophysical Union Fall Meeting 2008, Bibcode:2008AGUFM.T23B2022A, abstract #T23B-2022
- Atwater, B. F. (1999), "Radiocarbon dating of a Seattle earthquake to A.D. 900–930.", Seismological Research Letters, 70 (2): 232, doi:10.1785/gssrl.70.2.190
- Atwater, B. F.; Moore, A. L. (4 December 1992), "A Tsunami About 1000 Years Ago in Puget Sound, Washington" (PDF), Science, 258 (5088): 1614–1617, Bibcode:1992Sci...258.1614A, doi:10.1126/science.258.5088.1614, PMID 17742526, S2CID 34602506
- Ballantyne, D.; Pierepiekarz, M.; Chang, S. (2002), Seismic Vulnerability Assessment of the Seattle–Tacoma Highway Corridor using HAZUS (PDF)
- Blakely, R. J.; Wells, R. E.; Weaver, C. S.; Johnson, S. Y. (February 2002), "Location, structure, and seismicity of the Seattle fault zone, Washington: Evidence from aeromagnetic anomalies, geologic mapping, and seismic-reflection data" (PDF), GSA Bulletin, 114 (2): 169–177, Bibcode:2002GSAB..114..169B, doi:10.1130/0016-7606(2002)114<0169:LSASOT>2.0.CO;2, S2CID 128977256, archived from the original (PDF) on 2019-10-21
- Blakely, R. J.; Sherrod, B. L.; Hughes, J. F.; Anderson, M. L.; Wells, R. E.; Weaver, C. S. (2009), "The Saddle Mountain Fault Deformation Zone, Olympic Peninsula, Washington: Western Boundary of the Seattle Uplift" (PDF), Geosphere, 5 (2): 105–125, Bibcode:2009Geosp...5..105B, doi:10.1130/GES00196.1
- Brocher, T. M.; Parsons, T.; Blakely, R. J.; Christensen, N. I.; Fisher, M. A.; Wells, R. E.; the SHIPS Working Group (10 July 2001), "Upper crustal structure in Puget Lowland, Washington: Results from the 1998 Seismic Hazards Investigation in Puget Sound" (PDF), Journal of Geophysical Research, 106 (B7): 13, 541–13, 564, Bibcode:2001JGR...10613541B, doi:10.1029/2001JB000154
- Brown, E. H.; Dragovich, J. D. (December 2003), "Tectonic elements and evolution of northwest Washington", Washington Division of Geology and Earth Resources, Geologic Map GM–52, 1 sheet, scale 1:625,000, 12 p. text
- Bucknam, R. C.; Hemphill-Haley, E.; Leopold, E. B. (4 December 1992), "Abrupt Uplift Within the Past 1700 Years at Southern Puget Sound, Washington" (PDF), Science, 258: 1611–1614, Bibcode:1992Sci...258.1611B, doi:10.1126/science.258.5088.1611, PMID 17742525, S2CID 39423769
- Buerge, D. M. (March 6–13, 1985), "Lost Seattle, our shameful neglect of a rich archeological past", Seattle Weekly
- Daneš, Z. F.; Bonno, M. M.; Brau, E.; Gilham, W. D.; Hoffman, T. T.; Johansen, D.; Jones, M. H.; Malfait, B.; Masten, J.; Teague, G. O. (15 November 1965), "Geophysical investigation of the Southern Puget Sound area, Washington", Journal of Geophysical Research, 70 (22): 5573–5580, Bibcode:1965JGR....70.5573D, doi:10.1029/JZ070i022p05573
- Dragovich, J. D.; Walsh, T. J.; Anderson, M. L.; Hartog, R.; DuFrane, S. A.; Vervoot, J.; Williams, S. A.; Cakir, R.; Stanton, K. D.; Wolff, F. E.; Norman, D. K.; Czajkowski, J. L. (2009), "Geologic map of the North Bend 7.5-minute quadrangle, King County, Washington", Washington Division of Geology and Earth Resources, Geological Map GM–73, 1 sheet, scale 1:24,000, 39 p. text
- Fisher, M. A.; Hyndman, R. D.; Johnson, S. Y.; Brocher, T. M.; Crosson, R. S.; Wells, R. A.; Calvert, A. J.; ten Brink, U. S. (2005), "Crustal Structure and Earthquake Hazards of the Subduction Zone in Southwestern British Columbia and Western Washington" (PDF), U. S. Geological Survey, Professional Paper 1661-C
- González, F. I.; Sherrod, B. L.; Atwater, B. F.; Frankel, A. P.; Palmer, S. P.; Holmes, M. L.; Karlin, R. E.; Jaffe, B. E.; Titov, V. V.; Mofjeld, H. O.; Venturato, A. J. (June 2003), "Puget Sound Tsunami Sources – 2002 Workshop Report" (PDF), NOAA
- Haugerud, R. A.; Harding, D. J.; Johnson, S. Y.; Harless, J. L.; Weaver, C. S.; Sherrod, B. L. (June 2003), "High-Resolution Lidar Topography of the Puget Lowland, Washington – A Bonanza for Earth Science" (PDF), GSA Today, 13 (6): 4–10, Bibcode:2003GSAT...13f...4H, doi:10.1130/1052-5173(2003)13<0004:HLTOTP>2.0.CO;2
- Jacoby, G. C.; Williams, P. L.; Buckley, B. M. (4 December 1992), "Tree Ring Correlation Between Prehistoric Landslides and Abrupt Tectonic Events in Seattle, Washington", Science, 258: 1621–1623, Bibcode:1992Sci...258.1621J, doi:10.1126/science.258.5088.1621, PMID 17742529, S2CID 35721127
- Johnson, S. Y.; Blakely, R. J.; Stephenson, W. J.; Dadisman, S. V.; Fisher, M. A. (2004), "Active shortening of the Cascadia forearc and implications for seismic hazards of the Puget Lowland" (PDF), Tectonics, 23 (TC1011): 1–27, Bibcode:2004Tecto..23.1011J, doi:10.1029/2003TC001507
- Johnson, S. Y.; Blakely, R. J.; Brocher, T. M.; Bucknam, R. C.; Haeussler, P. J.; Pratt, T. L.; Nelson, A. R.; Sherrod, B. L.; Wells, R.E.; Lidke, D.J.; Harding, D.J.; Kelsey, H.M. (2004), "Fault number 570, Seattle fault zone", in U.S. Geological Survey (ed.), Quaternary fault and fold database for the United States
- Johnson, S. Y.; Dadisman, S. V.; Childs, J. R.; Stanley, W. D. (July 1999), "Active Tectonics of the Seattle Fault and Central Puget Sound, Washington: Implications for earthquake hazards", GSA Bulletin, 111 (7): 1042–1053, Bibcode:1999GSAB..111.1042J, doi:10.1130/0016-7606(1999)111<1042:ATOTSF>2.3.CO;2
- Johnson, S. Y.; Potter, C. J.; Armentrout, J. M. (January 1994), "Origin and evolution of the Seattle Fault and Seattle Basin, Washington", Geology, 22 (1): 71–74, Bibcode:1994Geo....22...71J, doi:10.1130/0091-7613(1994)022<0071:OAEOTS>2.3.CO;2
- Karlin, R. E.; Abella, S. E. B. (4 December 1992), "Paleoearthquakes in the Puget Sound Region Recorded in Sediments from Lake Washington, U.S." (PDF), Science, 258: 1617–1620, Bibcode:1992Sci...258.1617K, doi:10.1126/science.258.5088.1617, PMID 17742527, S2CID 8354010
- Karlin, R. E.; Holmes, M.; Abella, S. E. B.; Sylvester, R. (February 2004), "Holocene landslides and a 3500-year record of Pacific Northwest earthquakes from sediments in Lake Washington", GSA Bulletin, 116 (1–2): 94–108, Bibcode:2004GSAB..116...94K, doi:10.1130/B25158.1
- Kayen, R. E.; Barnhardt, W. A. (2007), "Seismic stability of the Duwamish River delta, Seattle, Washington", U. S. Geological Survey, Professional Paper 1661-E
- Kelsey, H. M.; Sherrod, B. L.; Nelson, A. R.; Brocher, T. M. (November–December 2008), "Earthquakes generated from bedding plane-parallel reverse faults above an active wedge thrust, Seattle fault zone.", GSA Bulletin, 120 (11/12): 1581–1597, Bibcode:2008GSAB..120.1581K, doi:10.1130/B26282.1
- Koshimura, S.; Mofjeld, H. O. (2001), "Inundation modeling of local tsunamis in Puget Sound, Washington, due to potential earthquakes", ITS 2001 Proceedings (Session 7, Number 7–18): 861–873
- Liberty, L. M. (2009), "The western extension of the Seattle fault: new insights from seismic reflection data" (PDF), U.S. Geological Survey, NEHRP, Project Award Number 08HQGR0075
- Ludwin, R. S.; Thrush, C. P.; Buerge, D.; Jonientz-Trisler, C.; Rasmussen, J.; Troost, K.; de los Angeles, A. (July–August 2005), "Serpent Spirit-power Stories along the Seattle Fault" (PDF), Seismological Research Letters, 76 (4): 426–431, Bibcode:2005SeiRL..76..426L, doi:10.1785/gssrl.76.4.426
- Nelson, A. R.; Johnson, S. Y.; Kelsey, H. M.; Wells, R. E.; Sherrod, B. L.; Pezzopane, S. K.; Bradley, L.; Koehler, R. D.; Bucknam, R. C. (November 2003), "Late Holocene earthquakes on the Toe Jam Hill fault, Seattle fault zone, Bainbridge Island, Washington" (PDF), GSA Bulletin, 115 (11): 1368–1403, Bibcode:2003GSAB..115.1388N, doi:10.1130/B25262.1
- Pratt, T. L.; Johnson, S. Y.; Potter, C. J.; Stephenson, W. J. (10 December 1997), "Seismic reflection images beneath Puget Sound, western Washington State: The Puget Lowland thrust sheet hypothesis" (PDF), Journal of Geophysical Research, 102 (B12): 27, 469–27, 490, Bibcode:1997JGR...10227469P, doi:10.1029/97JB01830
- Schuster, R. L.; Logan, R. L.; Pringle, P. T. (4 December 1992), "Prehistoric Rock Avalanches in the Olympic Mountains, Washington" (PDF), Science, 258: 1620–1621, Bibcode:1992Sci...258.1620S, doi:10.1126/science.258.5088.1620, PMID 17742528, S2CID 34847168
- Swanson, D. B.; Findlay, A. (December 2007), "City of Seattle Unreinforced Masonry Building Seismic Hazards Study" (PDF), City of Seattle Department of Planning and Development
- Tabor, R. W.; Frizzell, V. A. Jr.; Vance, J. A.; Naeser, C. W. (January 1984), "Ages and stratigraphy of lower and middle Tertiary sedimentary and volcanic rocks of the central Cascades, Washington: Application to the tectonic history of the Straight Creek fault", GSA Bulletin, 95 (1): 26–44, Bibcode:1984GSAB...95...26T, doi:10.1130/0016-7606(1984)95<26:AASOLA>2.0.CO;2
- Troost, K. G.; Booth, D. B. (May 22, 2004), Geology of Seattle: City of Seattle Field Trip (PDF), Seattle-Area Geologic Mapping Project Department of Earth and Space Sciences University of Washington
- Vance, J. A.; Miller, R. B. (1994), "Another look at the Fraser River-Straight Creek Fault (FRSCF) [abstract]", Geological Society of America 1994 Annual Meeting, Abstracts with Programs, 24: 88
- Walsh, T. J.; Arcas, D.; Venturato, A. J.; Titov, V. V.; Mofjeld, H. O.; Chamberlin, C. C.; González, F. I. (July 2009), "Tsunami hazard map of Tacoma, Washington—Model results for Seattle fault and Tacoma fault earthquake tsunamis" (PDF), Washington Division of Geology and Earth Resources, Open File Report 2009-9
