= Green Mountain (Kitsap County, Washington) =

Mountain in Washington (state), United States

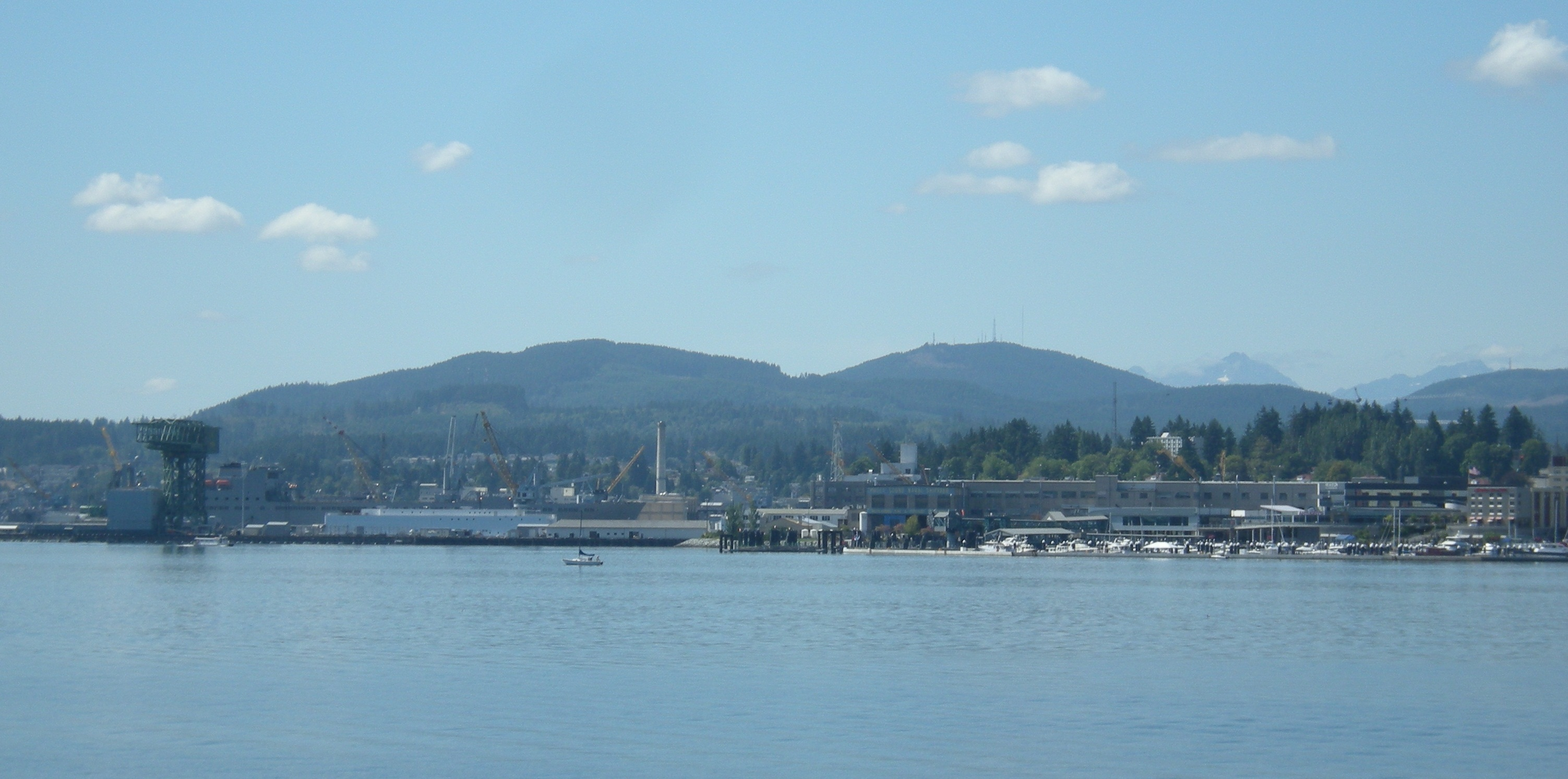
- Green Mountain, at right edge of frame, behind Bremerton, Washington

Highest point
- Elevation: 1,588 ft (484 m) NGVD 29
- Coordinates: 47°33′48″N 122°48′25″W

Geography
- Location within Washington (state)
- Location: Kitsap County, Washington, United States
- Parent range: Blue Hills
- Topo map: USGS Bremerton West

Green Mountain is a 1,700-foot (520 m) summit in the Blue Hills on the Kitsap Peninsula of Washington state, in the United States' Pacific Northwest. It is the second highest point on the Kitsap Peninsula and in Kitsap County, Washington, after 1,761-foot (537 m) Gold Mountain.

It lies within the boundaries of the 6,000-acre (2,400 ha) Green Mountain State Forest, which is adjacent to the City of Bremerton watershed, about seven miles (11 km) west of downtown Bremerton. There is a forest road, open to motorized traffic, to the summit, where there is a picnic area with vistas of Seattle and the Cascade Mountains to the east, and the Olympic Mountains to the west.

As of 2014, there is a single microwave tower on the mountain.
