= Gold Mountain (Washington) =

Mountain in Kitsap County, Washington, US

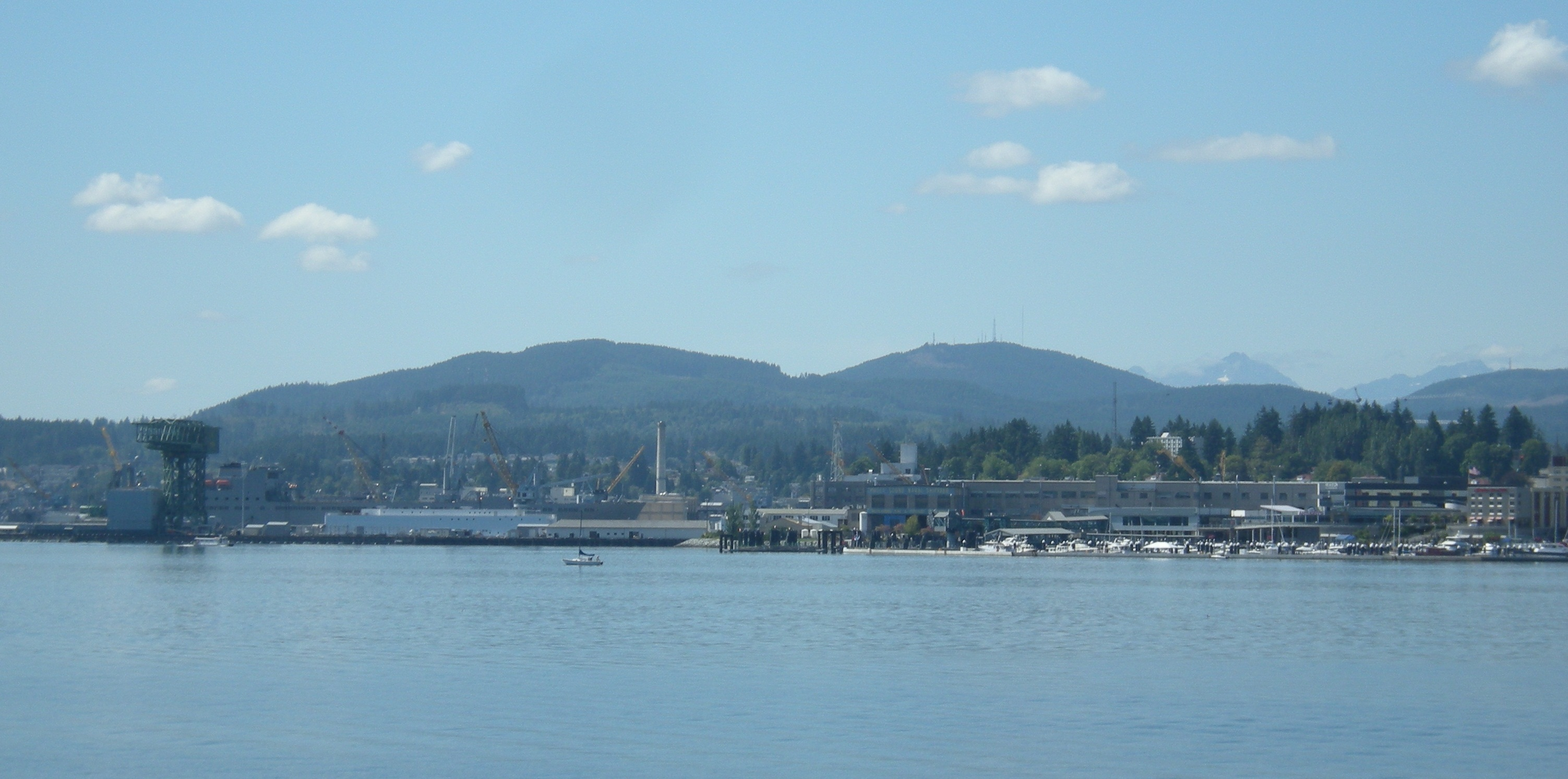
- Gold Mountain behind the Puget Sound Naval Shipyard in Bremerton

Highest point
- Elevation: 1,761 feet (537 m)
- Coordinates: 47°32′56″N 122°47′13″W

Geography
- Location: Kitsap County, Washington, United States
- Parent range: Blue Hills
- Topo map: USGS Bremerton West

Gold Mountain is a 1,761-foot (537 m) summit in the Blue Hills on the Kitsap Peninsula of Washington state, in the United States' Pacific Northwest. It is the highest point on the Kitsap Peninsula and the highest point in Kitsap County, Washington, and nearby 1,639-foot (500 m) Green Mountain is the second-highest point.

The mountain lies partly on private land, partly in the City of Bremerton watershed inaccessible to the general public, and partly in the adjacent 6,000-acre (2,400 ha) Green Mountain State Forest which is open to hikers, horses, and on- and off-road vehicles.

Most of the eastern half of Gold Mountain is in the city watershed, with the Union River reservoir at the foot. The summit itself is in a quarter quarter section exclave of the state forest, connected at a corner. The summit is about 660 feet (200 m) outside the city limits, six miles (9.7 km) west of downtown Bremerton.

== Radio and television transmitters ==
The mountain summit has an antenna farm including transmitters for Kitsap Peninsula area emergency services, as well as Seattle television and radio stations KCPQ (Fox 13), KTBW and KYFQ. Since 1981, the Western Washington Repeater Association has operated an amateur radio repeater, call sign WW7RA, on the site, with coverage throughout the Puget Sound region from Centralia to Bellingham.

A Continuously Operating Reference Station used for GPS-based geodesy is located at the KTBW site on the summit.
